= Martin Short filmography =

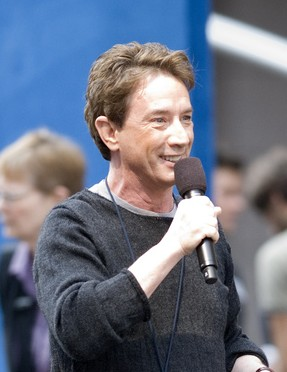
Martin Short in 2006

Martin Short is a Canadian actor and comedian known for his work in standup comedy, sketch comedy, and performances on stage and screen.

Short gained acclaim for his performances in the sketch comedy shows SCTV from 1981 to 1984 and Saturday Night Live from 1984 to 1985. He has starred in films such as Three Amigos (1986), Father of the Bride (1991), Clifford (1994), and The Pebble and the Penguin (1995). Short is also known for his role as Jiminy Glick in the Comedy Central series Primetime Glick from 2001 to 2003 and Oliver Putnam in the Hulu series Only Murders in the Building since 2021.

== Filmography ==
=== Film ===
| Year | Title | Role | Notes | Ref. |
|---|---|---|---|---|
| 1979 | Lost and Found | Engel | | |
| 1986 | Three Amigos | Ned Nederlander | | |
| 1987 | Innerspace | Jack Putter | | |
| 1987 | Cross My Heart | David Morgan | | |
| 1989 | Three Fugitives | Ned Perry | | |
| 1989 | The Big Picture | Neil Sussman | Uncredited | |
| 1991 | Pure Luck | Eugene Proctor | | |
| 1991 | Father of the Bride | Franck Eggelhoffer | | |
| 1992 | Captain Ron | Martin Harvey | | |
| 1993 | We're Back! A Dinosaur's Story | Stubbs the Clown | Voice | |
| 1994 | Clifford | Clifford Daniels | | |
| 1995 | The Pebble and the Penguin | Hubie | Voice | |
| 1995 | Father of the Bride Part II | Franck Eggelhoffer | | |
| 1996 | Mars Attacks! | Press Secretary Jerry Ross | | |
| 1997 | Jungle 2 Jungle | Richard Kempster | | |
| 1997 | A Simple Wish | Murray | | |
| 1998 | The Prince of Egypt | Huy | Voice | |
| 1998 | Akbar's Adventure Tours | Akbar | | |
| 1999 | Mumford | Lionel Dillard | | |
| 2001 | Get Over It | Dr. Desmond Forrest Oates | | |
| 2001 | Jimmy Neutron: Boy Genius | Ooblar | Voice | |
| 2002 | Treasure Planet | B.E.N. | Voice | |
| 2002 | CinéMagique | George | Short film | |
| 2003 | 101 Dalmatians II: Patch's London Adventure | Lars | Voice; direct-to-video | |
| 2004 | Barbie as the Princess and the Pauper | Preminger | Voice; direct-to-video | |
| 2004 | Jiminy Glick in Lalawood | Jiminy Glick / David Lynch | Also producer and writer | |
| 2006 | Khan Kluay | Jai | Voice; English dub | |
| 2006 | The Santa Clause 3: The Escape Clause | Jack Frost | | |
| 2007 | O Canada! | Narrator / presenter | Attraction at Canada Pavilion at Epcot | |
| 2008 | The Spiderwick Chronicles | Thimbletack | Voice | |
| 2011 | Hoodwinked Too! Hood vs. Evil | Kirk | Voice | |
| 2012 | Madagascar 3: Europe's Most Wanted | Stefano | Voice | |
| 2012 | Frankenweenie | Mr. Frankenstein / Mr. Bergermesiter / Nassor | Voice | |
| 2013 | Legends of Oz: Dorothy's Return | Appraiser / Jester | Voice | |
| 2013 | The Wind Rises | Kurokawa | Voice; English dub | |
| 2014 | Inherent Vice | Rudy Blatnoyd | | |
| 2015 | Being Canadian | Himself | Documentary | |
| 2018 | Bumblebee | | Scenes deleted | |
| 2018 | Elliot the Littlest Reindeer | Lemondrop / Ludzinka / Blitzen | Voice | |
| 2019 | The Addams Family | Grandpa Frump | Voice | |
| 2020 | The Willoughbys | Father Willoughby | Voice | |
| 2020 | Father of the Bride Part 3(ish) | Franck Eggelhoffer | Short film | |
| 2021 | Back Home Again | Justin Beaver | Voice | |
| 2022 | Mack & Rita | Cheese | Voice | |
| 2023 | Aquaman and the Lost Kingdom | Kingfish | Voice | |
| 2025 | John Candy: I Like Me | Himself | Documentary | |
| 2026 | I'm Chevy Chase and You're Not | Himself | Documentary | |
| 2026 | Marty, Life Is Short | Himself | Documentary | |
| 2026 | SCTV: The Greatest Show You've Never Heard Of | Himself | Documentary | |

=== Television ===
| Year | Title | Role | Notes | Ref. |
|---|---|---|---|---|
| 1972 | Right On | | Regular performer | |
| 1972 | Cucumber | Smokey the Hare | Episode: "Ecology ... Smokey the Hare" | |
| 1975 | Peep Show | | Episode: "Goldberg Is Waiting" | |
| 1976–1977 | The David Steinberg Show | Johnny Del Bravo | 10 episodes | |
| 1978 | For the Record | Weepy | Episode: "Cementhead" | |
| 1979 | The Family Man | Louie | Television film | |
| 1979–1980 | The Associates | Tucker Kerwin | 13 episodes | |
| 1980 | The Love Boat | Melvin | 4 episodes | |
| 1980–1981 | I'm a Big Girl Now | Neal Stryker | 14 episodes | |
| 1981 | Taxi | Mitch Harris | Episode: "Jim Joins the Network" | |
| 1981–1984 | Second City Television | Various roles | Cast member; also writer | |
| 1983 | Sunset Limousine | Bradley Z. Coleman | Television film | |
| 1984–2024 | Saturday Night Live | Various roles | Cast member (17 episodes); Host and guest appearances (16 episodes) | |
| 1986 | Tall Tales & Legends | Johnny Appleseed | Episode: "Johnny Appleseed" | |
| 1986 | Really Weird Tales | Shucky Forme | Episode: "All's Well That Ends Strange" | |
| 1988 | The Completely Mental Misadventures of Ed Grimley | Ed Grimley / Various roles | 13 episodes; also co-creator, writer and executive producer | |
| 1989–1990 | The Tracey Ullman Show | Various roles | 2 episodes | |
| 1990 | The Dave Thomas Comedy Show | Himself | Episode 4 | |
| 1990 | The Earth Day Special | Nathan Thurm | Television special | |
| 1991 | Maniac Mansion | Eddie O'Donnell | Episode: "Down & Out in Cedar Springs" | |
| 1992 | Favorite Songs | Mozart | Voice; episode: "Twinkle, Twinkle Little Star" | |
| 1992 | Shelley Duvall's Bedtime Stories | Narrator | Voice; episode: "Patrick's Dinosaurs/What Happened to Patrick's Dinosaurs?" | |
| 1994 | The Martin Short Show | Marty Short | 8 episodes; also creator, writer and executive producer | |
| 1996 | Muppets Tonight | Himself | Episode: "Martin Short" | |
| 1998 | Merlin | Frik | Miniseries | |
| 1999 | Alice in Wonderland | Mad Hatter | Television film | |
| 1999–2000 | The Martin Short Show | Himself | Host (63 episodes); also creator, writer and executive producer | |
| 1999–2002 | Mad TV | Himself / Jiminy Glick | 2 episodes | |
| 2001 | Prince Charming | Rodney | Television film | |
| 2001–2003 | Primetime Glick | Jiminy Glick / Various roles | 30 episodes; also creator, writer and executive producer | |
| 2002 | Curb Your Enthusiasm | Himself | Episode: "The Terrorist Attack" | |
| 2005 | Arrested Development | Uncle Jack | Episode: "Ready, Aim, Marry Me" | |
| 2005 | Law & Order: Special Victims Unit | Sebastian Ballentine / Henry Palaver | Episode: "Pure" | |
| 2005 | Dora the Explorer | The Dancing Elf | Voice; episode: "Dora's Dance to the Rescue" | |
| 2006 | Jeopardy! | Himself | Contestant; 1 episode | |
| 2007 | Bob & Doug McKenzie's Two-Four Anniversary | Himself | Television special | |
| 2010 | Damages | Leonard Winstone | 13 episodes | |
| 2010–2018 | The Cat in the Hat Knows a Lot About That! | The Cat in the Hat | Voice; main role | |
| 2011 | Weeds | Steward Havens | 3 episodes | |
| 2011–2012 | How I Met Your Mother | Garrison Cootes | 3 episodes | |
| 2012 | Canada's Got Talent | Himself | Judge (Season 1); 22 episodes | |
| 2013–2014 | Hollywood Game Night | Himself | 2 episodes | |
| 2014 | Working the Engels | Charles "Chuck" Pastry | Episode: "Jenna vs. Big Pastry" | |
| 2014–2015 | Mulaney | Louis "Lou" Cannon | 13 episodes | |
| 2015 | Unbreakable Kimmy Schmidt | Dr. Grant | Episode: "Kimmy Goes to the Doctor" | |
| 2015 | Difficult People | Himself | Episode: "Pledge Week" | |
| 2015 | Saturday Night Live 40th Anniversary Special | Himself | Television special | |
| 2016 | Maya & Marty | Himself / Various roles | 6 episodes; also co-creator, writer and producer | |
| 2016 | Hairspray Live! | Wilbur Turnblad | Live musical telecast | |
| 2016 | Modern Family | Mervin "Merv" Schechter | Episode: "Blindsided" | |
| 2017 | BoJack Horseman | Poppy Stilton | Voice; episode: "The Judge" | |
| 2017 | The Simpsons | Guthrie Frenel | Voice; episode: "Springfield Splendor" | |
| 2018 | The Last Man On Earth | Man in SUV | Episode: "Karl" | |
| 2018 | The Magic School Bus Rides Again | Tony Tennelli | Voice; episode: "Ralphie and the Flying Tennellis" | |
| 2019 | Big Mouth | Gordie | Voice; episode: "Cellsea" | |
| 2019 | Comedians in Cars Getting Coffee | Himself | Guest; episode: "Martin Short: A Dream World Of Residuals" | |
| 2019–2021 | The Morning Show | Dick Lundry | 3 episodes | |
| 2020 | Good People | Dean Ed Brown | Television film | |
| 2021–2023 | Schmigadoon! | Leprechaun | 3 episodes | |
| 2021–present | Only Murders in the Building | Oliver Putnam | Main role; also executive producer | |
| 2022 | Beauty and the Beast: A 30th Celebration | Lumière | Television special | |
| 2023 | Tough as Nails | Himself | Episode: "Tough Times Don't Last but Tough People Do" | |
| 2024 | Real Time with Bill Maher | Jiminy Glick | Episode: "Jiminy Glick/Andrew Cuomo/Adam Kinzinger" | |
| 2024 | Jimmy Kimmel Live! | Himself | Guest host (4 episodes) | |
| 2025 | Grimsburg | Otis Volcanowitz | Voice; episode: “Training Wheels Day” | |
| 2025 | Match Game | Himself | Host | |

=== Theatre ===
| Year | Title | Role | Venue | Ref. |
|---|---|---|---|---|
| 1972 | Godspell | Jeffrey | Royal Alexandra Theatre, Toronto | |
| 1993 | The Goodbye Girl | Elliot | Marquis Theatre, Broadway | |
| 1997 | Promises, Promises | Chuck Baxter | New York City Center, Encores! | |
| 1998–1999 | Little Me | Various | Criterion Center Stage Right, Broadway | |
| 2003–2004 | The Producers | Leo Bloom | Orpheum Theatre, San Francisco | |
| 2003–2004 | The Producers | Leo Bloom | Pantages Theatre, Los Angeles | |
| 2006–2007 | Martin Short: Fame Becomes Me | Himself | Bernard B. Jacobs Theatre, Broadway | |
| 2013 | The Pirates of Penzance | Major General | Delacorte Theatre, The Public Theatre | |
| 2015 | It's Only a Play | James Wicker (Replacement) | Bernard B. Jacobs Theatre, Broadway | |
| 2023 | Gutenberg! The Musical! | The Producer (One night only) | James Earl Jones Theatre, Broadway | |

=== Comedy specials ===
| Year | Title | Role | Notes | Ref. |
|---|---|---|---|---|
| 1985 | Martin Short: Concert for the North Americas | Various | Showtime | |
| 1989 | I, Martin Short, Goes Hollywood | Various | HBO | |
| 2012 | I, Martin Short, Goes Home | Various | CBC | |
| 2018 | Steve Martin and Martin Short: An Evening You Will Forget for the Rest of Your Life | Performer | Netflix | |

=== Video games ===
| Year | Title | Role | Notes |
|---|---|---|---|
| 1996 | Creature Crunch | Wesley | |
| 2002 | Treasure Planet | B.E.N. | |

== See also ==
- List of awards and nominations received by Martin Short
