= List of awards and nominations received by Martin Short =

Martin Short awards and nominations
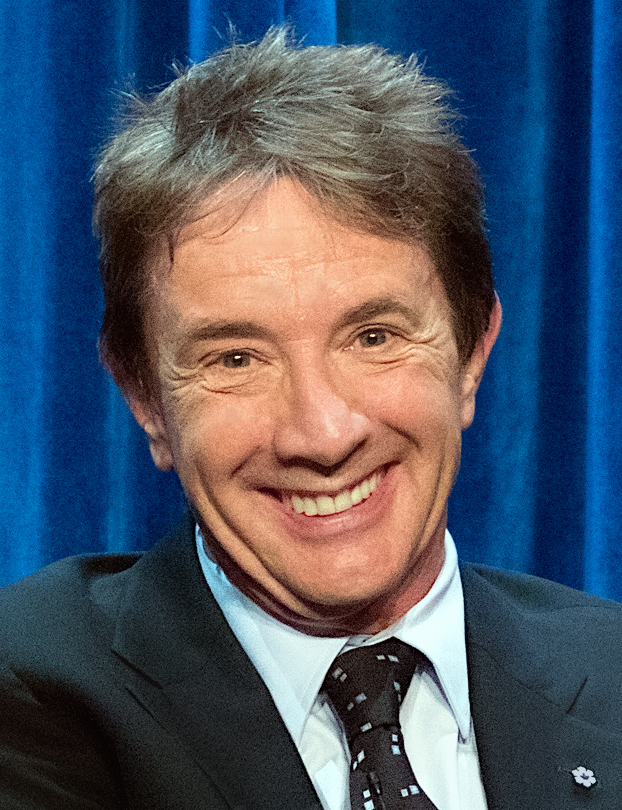
- Short in 2014
Awards and nominations
Award	Wins	Nominations
Actor Awards	2	7
Critics' Choice Awards	0	2
Daytime Emmy Awards	0	3
Golden Globe Awards	0	5
Primetime Emmy Awards	2	23
Tony Awards	1	2

Totals (Note: Certain award groups do not simply award one winner. They acknowledge several different recipients, have runners-up, and have third place. Since this is a specific recognition and is different from losing an award, runner-up mentions are considered wins in this award tally. For simplification and to avoid errors, each award in this list has been presumed to have had a prior nomination.)
- Wins: 12
- Nominations: 94

Martin Short is a Canadian actor and comedian. Known for his roles on stage and screen, he has received several awards including two Primetime Emmy Awards, two Actor Awards, and a Tony Awards as well as nominations for four Golden Globe Awards.

Short won the Primetime Emmy Award for Outstanding Writing for a Variety Series for his work on the Canadian sketch comedy series SCTV in 1983. He was nominated the Primetime Emmy Award for Outstanding Individual Performance in a Variety or Music Program for his Comedy Central variety series Primetime Glick in 2003. Also known for his dramatic work he was Emmy-nominated for his roles in the NBC miniseries Merlin (1998), the FX legal series Damages (2010), and the Apple TV+ drama series The Morning Show (2020).

Since 2021, he has starred as Oliver Putnam in the Hulu comedy series Only Murders in the Building acting opposite Steve Martin and Selena Gomez. Short has earned two Actor Award for Outstanding Actor in a Comedy Series and Outstanding Ensemble in a Comedy Series in 2024. He has also earned nominations for three Primetime Emmy Awards for Outstanding Lead Actor in a Comedy Series, three Golden Globe Awards for Best Actor – Television Series Musical or Comedy, and two Critics' Choice Television Awards for Best Actor in a Comedy Series.

On stage, he starred in the Neil Simon musical Little Me (1999) for which he won the Tony Award for Best Actor in a Musical. He was Tony-nominated for his performance in the Neil Simon comedy play The Goodbye Girl (1993).

== Major associations ==
=== Actor Awards ===
Year	Category	Nominated work	Result	Ref.
2021	Outstanding Ensemble in a Comedy Series	Only Murders in the Building (season one)	Nominated	
2021	Outstanding Male Actor in a Comedy Series	Only Murders in the Building (season one)	Nominated	
2022	Outstanding Male Actor in a Comedy Series	Only Murders in the Building (season two)	Nominated	
2022	Outstanding Ensemble in a Comedy Series	Only Murders in the Building (season two)	Nominated	
2023	Outstanding Ensemble in a Comedy Series	Only Murders in the Building (season three)	Nominated	
2024	Outstanding Ensemble in a Comedy Series	Only Murders in the Building (season four)	Won	
2024	Outstanding Male Actor in a Comedy Series	Only Murders in the Building (season four)	Won	
2025	Outstanding Male Actor in a Comedy Series	Only Murders in the Building (season five)	Nominated	
2025	Outstanding Ensemble in a Comedy Series	Only Murders in the Building (season five)	Nominated	

=== Critics' Choice Awards ===
Year	Category	Nominated work	Result	Ref.
Critics' Choice Television Awards
2021	Best Actor in a Comedy Series	Only Murders in the Building	Nominated	
2024	Best Actor in a Comedy Series	Only Murders in the Building	Nominated	

=== Emmy Awards ===
Year	Category	Nominated work	Result	Ref.
Primetime Emmy Awards
1983	Outstanding Writing in a Variety or Music Program	SCTV Network 90 (episode: "Sweeps Week")	Won	
1983	Outstanding Writing in a Variety or Music Program	SCTV Network 90 (episode: "The Christmas Show")	Nominated	
1983	Outstanding Writing in a Variety or Music Program	SCTV Network 90 (episode: "Joe Walsh")	Nominated	
1983	Outstanding Writing in a Variety or Music Program	SCTV Network 90 (episode: "Robin Williams, America")	Nominated	
1983	Outstanding Writing in a Variety or Music Program	SCTV Network 90 (episode: "Towering Inferno")	Nominated	
1998	Outstanding Supporting Actor in a Limited Series or Movie	Merlin	Nominated	
2003	Outstanding Individual Performance in a Variety Program	Primetime Glick	Nominated	
2010	Outstanding Supporting Actor in a Drama Series	Damages (episode: "You Haven't Replaced Me")	Nominated	
2014	Outstanding Variety Special	AFI Life Achievement Award: Mel Brooks	Won	
2018	Outstanding Variety Special	Steve Martin and Martin Short: An Evening You Will Forget for the Rest of Your Life	Nominated	
2018	Outstanding Writing for a Variety Special	Steve Martin and Martin Short: An Evening You Will Forget for the Rest of Your Life	Nominated	
2020	Outstanding Guest Actor in a Drama Series	The Morning Show (episode: "Chaos is the New Cocaine")	Nominated	
2022	Outstanding Comedy Series (as executive producer)	Only Murders in the Building (season one)	Nominated	
2022	Outstanding Lead Actor in a Comedy Series	Only Murders in the Building (episode: "How Well Do You Know Your Neighbors?")	Nominated	
2023	Outstanding Comedy Series (as executive producer)	Only Murders in the Building (season two)	Nominated	
2023	Outstanding Lead Actor in a Comedy Series	Only Murders in the Building (episode: "The Tell")	Nominated	
2024	Outstanding Comedy Series (as executive producer)	Only Murders in the Building (season three)	Nominated	
2024	Outstanding Lead Actor in a Comedy Series	Only Murders in the Building (episode: "Ah, Love!")	Nominated	
2025	Outstanding Comedy Series (as executive producer)	Only Murders in the Building (season four)	Nominated	
2025	Outstanding Lead Actor in a Comedy Series	Only Murders in the Building (episode: "Escape from Planet Klongo")	Nominated	
2026	Outstanding Comedy Series (as executive producer)	Only Murders in the Building (season five)	Nominated	
2026	Outstanding Lead Actor in a Comedy Series	Only Murders in the Building (episode: "Flatbush")	Nominated	
2026	Outstanding Host for a Game Show	Match Game	Nominated	
Daytime Emmy Awards
2000	Outstanding Talk Show	The Martin Short Show	Nominated	
2000	Outstanding Talk Show Host	The Martin Short Show	Nominated	
2011	Outstanding Performer in an Animated Program	The Cat in the Hat Knows a Lot About That!	Nominated	

=== Golden Globe Awards ===
Year	Category	Nominated work	Result	Ref.
2021	Best Actor in a Television Series – Musical or Comedy	Only Murders in the Building	Nominated	
2022	Best Actor in a Television Series – Musical or Comedy	Only Murders in the Building	Nominated	
2023	Best Actor in a Television Series – Musical or Comedy	Only Murders in the Building	Nominated	
2024	Best Actor in a Television Series – Musical or Comedy	Only Murders in the Building	Nominated	
2025	Best Actor in a Television Series – Musical or Comedy	Only Murders in the Building	Nominated	

=== Tony Awards ===
Year	Category	Nominated work	Result	Ref.
1993	Best Actor in a Musical	The Goodbye Girl	Nominated	
1999	Best Actor in a Musical	Little Me	Won	

== Miscellaneous awards ==
Awards and nominations received by Martin Short
Award	Year	Category	Nominated work	Result	Ref.
Canadian Screen Awards	2012	Best Actor in a Comedy Series	I, Martin Short, Goes Home	Nominated	
Canadian Screen Awards	2016	Best Performance in an animated program or series	The Cat in the Hat Knows a Lot About That!	Won	
Canadian Screen Awards	2017	Best Performance in an animated program or series	The Cat in the Hat Knows a Lot About That!	Won	
Canadian Screen Awards	2018	Best Performance in an animated program or series	The Cat in the Hat Knows a Lot About That!	Won	
HCA TV Awards	2022	Best Actor in a Streaming Series, Comedy	Only Murders in the Building	Won	
HCA TV Awards	2023	Best Actor in a Streaming Series, Comedy	Only Murders in the Building	Nominated	
HCA TV Awards	2023	Best Guest Actor in a Comedy Series	Saturday Night Live (Note: Shared with Steve Martin.)	Nominated	
MTV Movie & TV Awards	2022	Best Team shared with Selena Gomez and Steve Martin	Only Murders in the Building	Nominated	
Satellite Award	1999	Best Supporting Actor – Series, Miniseries or TV Film	Merlin	Nominated	
Satellite Award	2011	Best Supporting Actor – Series, Miniseries or TV Film	Damages	Nominated	
Writers Guild of America Awards	2017	Comedy/Variety Sketch Series	Maya & Marty	Nominated	

== Theatre awards ==
Awards and nominations received by Martin Short
Award	Year	Category	Nominated work	Result	Ref.
Drama Desk Awards	1993	Outstanding Actor in a Musical	The Goodbye Girl	Nominated	
Drama Desk Awards	1999	Outstanding Actor in a Musical	Little Me	Nominated	
Drama Desk Awards	2007	Outstanding Actor in a Musical	Martin Short: Fame Becomes Me	Nominated	
Outer Critics Circle	1993	Outstanding Actor in a Musical	The Goodbye Girl	Won	
Outer Critics Circle	1999	Outstanding Actor in a Musical	Little Me	Won	
Theatre World Award	1993	Theater World Award	—N/a	Won	

== Honours ==
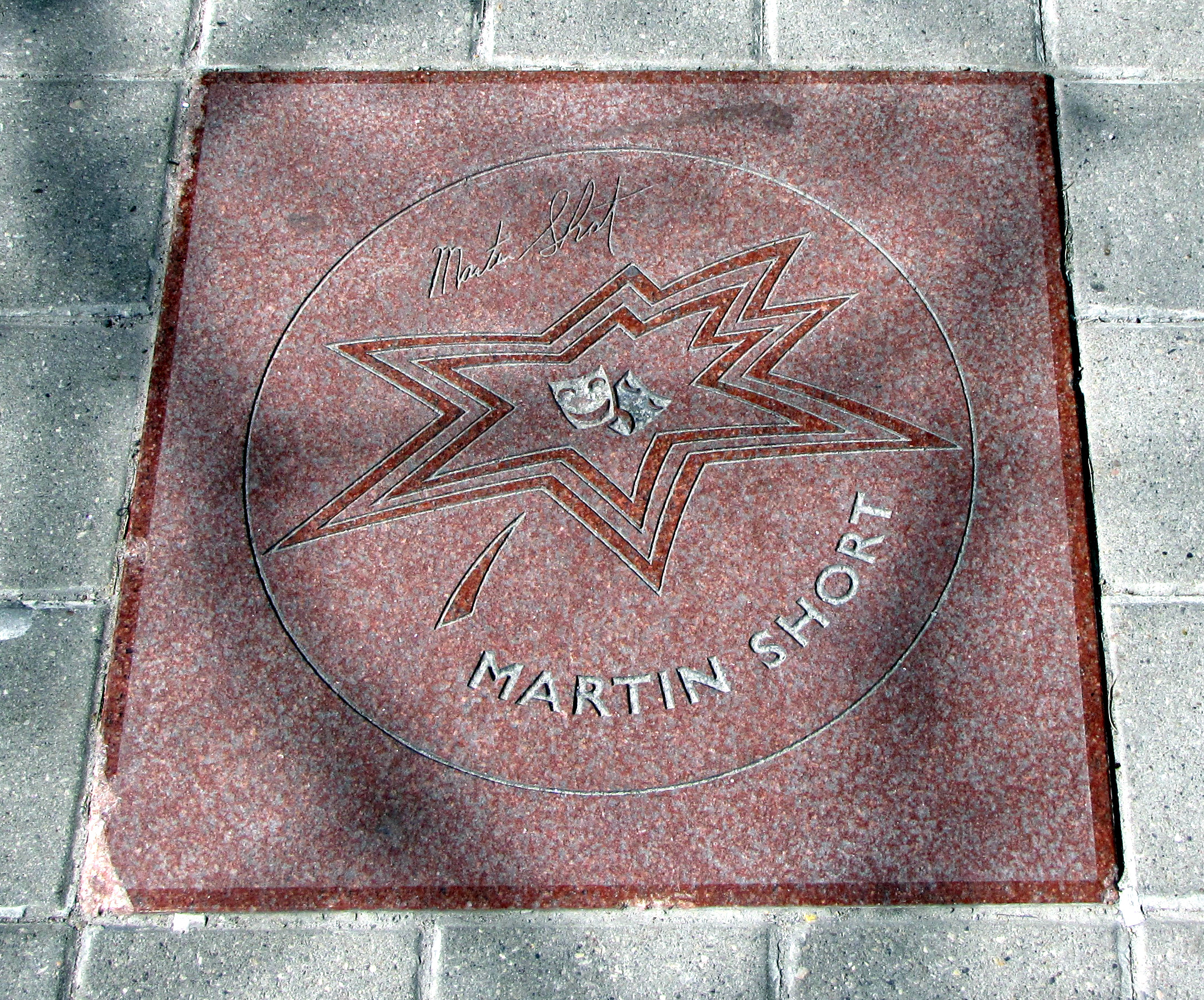
Short's star on Canada's Walk of Fame

Organizations	Year	Award	Result	Ref.
Nelly Award	1982	Outstanding Writing for SCTV Comedy Network	Honored	
Queen Elizabeth II	1994	Made a Member of the Order of Canada	Honored	
Canadian Screen Awards	1995	Earle Grey Lifetime Achievement Award	Honored	
Banff Television Festival	1999	Sir Peter Ustinov Award	Honored	
Canada's Walk of Fame	2000	Star on the Walk of Fame	Honored	
McMaster University	2001	Honorary Doctor of Literature	Honored	
Queen Elizabeth II	2002	Golden Jubilee Medal	Honored	
Queen Elizabeth II	2012	Diamond Jubilee Medal	Honored	
Independent Spirit Awards	2014	Robert Altman Award for Inherent Vice	Honored	
Canada Post	2015	A stamp issued	Honored	
Canadian Screen Awards	2016	Lifetime Achievement Award	Honored	
Queen Elizabeth II	2019	Made an Officer of the Order of Canada	Honored	
