= Jiminy Glick =

Fictional character portrayed by Martin Short

Jiminy Glick is a fictional character created and portrayed by Martin Short in the TV series Primetime Glick (2001–2003), the subsequent 2004 film Jiminy Glick in Lalawood, and Short's Broadway show Martin Short: Fame Becomes Me. He began as a recurring character on The Martin Short Show.

Short wears prosthetics when performing as Glick, a morbidly obese entertainment journalist who interviews celebrities. The Glick routines are largely improvised and involve fawning praise, insult comedy, awkward questions, and absurd remarks in a serious tone. Glick is often ignorant of basic facts about the people he interviews, and often seems oblivious to pop culture and the world in general. Some interviewees did not realize Glick was a character, especially in the stunt's early years.

Short has cited Skip E. Lowe as the inspiration for Jiminy Glick. Lowe hosted a long-running low-budget talk show that featured leading film stars.

== Fictional biography ==
The details of Glick's self-proclaimed biography have varied across interviews and occasionally been contradictory. Dennis Miller called Glick's life "one big CliffsNote missing a page". But below is a summary of the character's claims about his life.

Born Malcolm Glickman on March 12, 1948, in Akron, Ohio; Omaha, Nebraska; or Baton Rouge, Louisiana), Glick was "the middle child of 10 children" of Omar and Isabella Glickman. Glick, who describes himself as a Tibetan-American, was often a loner and regularly teased due to his childhood obesity. He was also very sickly until he was 13, when doctors discovered that he had a small Tonka truck stuck in his duodenum. As a child, while riding his bike and listening to the song "Michael Row the Boat Ashore", he lost his virginity when he fell on the "boy bar". He has said he never liked the name Malcolm and was given the nickname "Jiminy" because crickets laid eggs in his anus. But Glick also told Larry David that Jiminy is his real name, given to him because his parents "were from the Baháʼí Faith". In an interview with Ben Stiller, Glick said he and his wife were Buddhists.

After Glick graduated from Gale Gordon High School, and continued on to DeVry Institute of Technology and the University of Wisconsin, his life changed forever when the play Forty Carats, starring Lana Turner, came to town. He was asked to join the show and traveled to Tulsa, Oklahoma, where he played "Onlooker Number Two", which he said was "like a dream!" After his short stage acting career and a performance as the leper in the film Papillon, Glick became Charles Bronson's personal assistant for five years during the 1970s. He had planned on working for Robert Vaughn, but according to Glick, he "didn't pay".

Bronson allegedly mistreated Glick and at one point threw him off his boat, mistaking him for Sebastian Cabot. Glick was picked up in a boat by George Maharis, of the TV show Route 66, and his cousin, Leon Maharis. Leon asked Glick to work with him at Chasen's in Beverly Hills, California, as a busboy. Glick eagerly accepted the offer. There he ran into numerous Hollywood celebrities, such as Justin Timberlake, Madonna, Britney Spears, James Dean, and Charlton Heston. One day, while catering a party at Roddy McDowall's house, George Schlatter from Rowan and Martin's Laugh-In offered Glick a pilot episode deal for a daytime talk show. Glick accepted and started at the Beverly Garland Motel (not the Beverly-Garland Hotel). And, Glick has said, "that's how it all started." The daytime talk show was canceled when Beverly Garland herself came downstairs and, lacking sleep and thoroughly intoxicated, shouted to Glick and his crew to "get the hell out!" Later in his career, Glick moved to prime time.

In 1974, Glick worked as Telly Savalas's personal assistant. Savalas was cruel, so Glick embezzled $85,000 from him. Glick was caught on his way to Ecuador and served a four-month hard labor sentence in Mississippi.

Glick is married to Dixie, a heavily medicated, alcoholic Southern woman who was portrayed by Jan Hooks. Together they have "four wonderfully strapping young boys": Morgan, Mason, Matthew, and Modine (named for actors Morgan Mason and Matthew Modine). Morgan and Mason are teenage twins and Matthew and Modine are 10-year-old twins; they were actually triplets but he sent one away because "two was so much already". The Glick family resides in Tarzana, California.

Glick is an avid pole vaulter, having done it in college and occasionally pole vaulting with his wife.

Ted Nugent once gave Glick 400 mutton patties for Christmas.

During an interview with Alec Baldwin, Glick declared himself a Whig.

== Appearances ==
=== On The Martin Short Show ===
In the show, Glick is a famous television interviewer who has been around Hollywood for a long time. Despite this, he remains laughably ignorant of pop culture and most entertainment news, though he considers himself just the opposite. For example, he often cites another celebrity with whom the interviewee apparently shares a birthday (but in reality does not) and ask how it makes them "feel". His interviews with stars are characterized by his patronizing attitude, frequent bizarre questions about obscure matters, awkward body language, and ultimately turning the subject matter to himself. He is extremely forgetful, and takes ginkgo biloba as a memory aid (although, as he often points out, the catch twenty-one [a play on words] is that he doesn't remember to take it). Glick is also very overweight, and during interviews will sometimes aggressively stuff his face with junk food (always present on the table on set) at a moment's notice. Glick occasionally offers food to his guests, but if they reach for it without being offered, he snatches it away, growling, "No! All for me!" On top of his many other eccentricities, Glick has an unforgettably peculiar voice, shifting within a single sentence from a high, effeminate whine to a deep growl.

=== In Primetime Glick ===
On the series, Glick is joined by long-suffering, heavily made-up announcer and bandleader Adrian Van Voorhees (Michael McKean), who resembles Lawrence Welk. Adrian plays a full classical harp, leading a band of scraggly-looking immigrants that does a very poor job of synching up their "performance" with the music. While Adrian generally attempts to conduct himself in a professional manner, he occasionally loses his patience with Glick's idiocy and constant, usually unintentional put-downs. He can sometimes be heard muttering disgustedly about Glick ("You are fat...sloppy fat") but Glick remains blissfully unaware of Adrian's hostility.

Prior to his role on Primetime Glick, Adrian had been admiring Glick from afar for many years, but had been laid up with a skin condition, putting him out of work. He then began to send Glick fan mail and finally asked him for a job saying, "I think you need a harp." Glick, thinking Adrian had written "tarp", called Adrian as he was doing some work on his pool at the time. While awaiting Glick's response, Adrian boarded the cruise ship S.S.S. Statadam and conducted its band. Glick finally met up with him upon the ship's return, exclaiming in an interview, "the next thing you know, Van Vorhees is part of the Glick world."

Glick is also often assailed by Short's long-running, Bette Davis-esque drag character, Miss Gathercole, a bitter, ancient woman who is a regular in Glick's studio audience (alongside her increasingly short-tempered nurse) and freely offers commentary on Glick's various failings and her own latest adventures. It was also said that another of Short's long-running characters, elderly vaudevillian Irving Cohen was the executive producer of Glick's primetime show. The mention was only for the span of a single episode where Cohen suffers from a heart attack and is presumed dead, with Glick offering video tributes to him until he calls the studio to say he's okay.

In addition to the interviews, the show also featured many Second City TV-like parody commercials and Glick reading storybook tales to a group of young children, appropriately called Lalawood Fables. These stories were usually Hollywood Babylon-like tales of Tinseltown degradation, acted out by puppets. Most of his stories are lost on his young audience. The show sometimes had a more fanciful side, as when the puppets would apparently come to life; once Glick and Jason Alexander spent too long in a steamroom and emerged dwarf-sized, and once Glick accidentally crushed Robert Downey Jr., also in the steamroom.

=== Other appearances ===
Glick is the main character in the feature film Jiminy Glick in Lalawood.

In Martin Short: Fame Becomes Me, Glick interviews (through complete improvisation) an audience volunteer tasked to become the show's "new star" after Martin Short is struck by lightning (a ploy to allow Short enough time to don the Jiminy Glick make-up).

Short played the character in an episode of MADtv. A social media account for "Jiminy Glick" on Myspace has photos, video clips, commentary, blogs, and postings from over 9,320 friends of Glick and Short.

Short also portrayed the character for a week on the Whoopi Goldberg-produced era of Hollywood Squares, during a College Tournament in 2001; for the tournament finals he filled in as center square; other celebrities on that panel had also been center square, as Whoopi was out sick that week.

Glick also made an appearance on the April 16, 2005 episode of Saturday Night Live hosted by Tom Brady. He appeared as a guest on the Weekend Update segment plugging a fictitious "Best of Jiminy Glick" DVD, including a clip of Glick interviewing SNL creator Lorne Michaels (portrayed by Will Forte) supposedly shot in the 1970s. Glick then forcibly kisses Update anchor Tina Fey as the segment ends.

Glick appears in Maya & Marty interviewing celebrities such as Larry David, Kevin Hart, Jerry Seinfeld and Ricky Gervais.

On the April 28, 2017 episode of The Tonight Show Starring Jimmy Fallon, Glick interviewed Donald Trump (portrayed by Jimmy Fallon) about his first 100 days in office.

In 2024, Glick resurfaced on the talk-show circuit. On the June 21, 2024, episode of Real Time with Bill Maher, he interviewed Maher. He also guest-hosted Jimmy Kimmel Live!, usurping guest host Martin Short's time on the show. Short was filling in for the vacationing Kimmel. Among those Glick interviewed were Bill Hader, Melissa McCarthy, Sean Hayes, and Nick Kroll.
