= Christmas in Compton =

- Directed by: David Raynr
- Written by: David Raynr; Suzanne Broderick; Robert Fedor
- Produced by: Murillo Penchel; Marchia Cabral Penchel; Michael Hubbard; Beth Hubbard
- Starring: Omar Gooding; Keith David; Sheryl Lee Ralph; Eric Roberts
- Cinematography: Sandra Valde-Hansen
- Edited by: Richard Halsey
- Music by: Dan Spollen
- Production company: Bright Idea Entertainment
- Distributed by: Barnholtz Entertainment
- Release date: November 9, 2012
- Running time: 93 minutes
- Country: United States
- Language: English

Christmas in Compton is a 2012 American Christmas comedy film starring Keith David and Omar Gooding. It was directed by David Raynr.

== Plot ==
Derrick is an aspiring music producer whose major accomplishment is the discovery of DJ Killionaire, an artist now generating millions for record executive Tommy Maxell. Derrick feels cheated by Maxell when he does not receive his believed share of the profits due to fine print in the contract. His lack of income leads to a fight with his father Big Earl, the owner of a children's academy as well as a Christmas tree lot in Compton, California, during the week before Christmas.

Big Earl suffers a heart attack and during his recovery he signs documents giving Derrick co-ownership of the house and the Christmas tree lot in an attempt to teach him responsibility. When Maxell threatens steal female trio Sugar Stuff out from Derrick's management, Derrick seeks revenge on Maxell by posing as an exterminator and robbing a $300,000 pink diamond ring from Maxell's house. He attempts to sell the stolen ring through the intermediary Delicious, a pawn shop owner, but the first prospective buyer is a local criminal who attempts to rob the ring and has to be chased off. Urgently in need of money in order to extend Sugar Stuff's contract, Derrick puts up the Christmas tree lot as collateral for a $150,000 loan from loan shark Ernesto Martinez, who demands repayment and an additional $25,000 in interest by Christmas Eve. Tommy Maxell buys the loan from Ernesto Martinez in order to take the Christmas tree lot as collateral and also hires criminals to steal back the ring from Delicious. Derrick and his friends go on a promotional frenzy for Sugar Stuff by selling their CD all over Compton in order to push their contract price up so that Maxwell will be convinced to tear up the loan in return for being allowed to sign Sugar Stuff to his label. They get involved in a car crash with a local hustler who listens to their story in prison and is moved to help them because his nephew attends Big Earl's academy. His crew rapidly distributes Sugar Stuff's CDs to the local radio stations and distributes their music on iTunes, quickly earning over $100,000. Big Earl forces Derrick to sign back ownership of the Christmas tree lot to him, but the papers are actually for ownership of Sugar Stuff. Big Earl negotiates with Maxell, who agrees to build a community center on the lot and employ Derrick as a producer for the artists on the label in return for ownership of the lot and the ability to sign Sugar Stuff to his label. Big Earl says that he will simply take the money that was made that day and buy another lot with it.

== Cast ==
- Ayo Adeyemi as African Drummer
- Louis "Louis King" Adeyemi as African Drummer
- Charlotte Ayanna as Ginger
- Kamilah Barrett as Dancer
- Alycia Bellamy as Shante
- Jayda Brown as Sierra
- Orlando Brown as Tyrone
- Christopher Carroll as Butler
- Luke Christopher as himself
- Porscha Coleman as Kendra Campbell
- Melanie Comarcho as Quanita
- Keith David as Big Earl
- Marcos De Silvas as Ernesto Martinez
- Kristinia DeBarge as Lola
- Fefe Dobson as Kim
- Michael Duncan as Michael Duncan
- Omar Gooding as Derrick Hollander
- Cynthia Graham as Mrs. Hubbard
- Reegan Haynes as Dancer
- Edwin Hodge as Pookie
- Spencer Hubbard as DJ Killionaire
- Budd Jackson as Heckler
- Leslie Jones as Tiny
- Don "Magic" Juan as Donald Campbell
- Charles Kim as Steve Ho
- Arif S. Kinchen as Squeaky
- Buddy Lewis as Mr. Hubbard (as Roland "Buddy" Lewis)
- Karen Y. McClain as Mrs. Jones (as Karen McClain)
- Jonathan McHugh as Policeman #2
- "Big" LeRoy Mobley as Audience Heckler
- Luis Moncada as Mexican Driver
- Miguel A. Núñez Jr. as Delicious
- Zion Otano as Leon
- Jay Perry as Police Officer (as Jermanne Perry)
- Sheryl Lee Ralph as Abuta
- Evan Rayner as E-Ray
- Darryl Alan Reed as Sly
- Eric Roberts as Tommy Maxell
- Robair Sims as Stunt Skater
- Emiliano Torres as Tre
- Matthew Willig as Charlie
- Malin Yhr as Lost White Woman
- Heather Rae El Moussa as Paulette

== Production ==
Filming took place on-location in Compton.

== Release ==
The film was released in the United States on November 9, 2012.

== Reception ==
The film received mixed reviews. In a positive review, John Anderson of Variety.com wrote, "With a first-rate cast led by Keith David and Sheryl Lee Ralph, generously funny dialogue and a supporting cast capable of crisp comic timing, writer-director David Raynr's feature is warm and likable enough to jumpstart the holiday movie season." In a negative review, Frank Scheck of The Hollywood Reporter called the film "a lump of coal in filmgoers' stockings." Noting the early release date, Scheck went on to write, "Forget Christmas, this risible early holiday release won't make it until Thanksgiving."

== See also ==
- List of black films of the 2010s
- List of Christmas films
