= Sunnyside Garden Arena =

Former boxing and wrestling arena in Queens, New York

- Sunnyside Gardens
- The Sunnyside Garden Arena
- Interactive map of Sunnyside Garden Arena
- Address: 44-16 Queens Boulevard
- Location: Sunnyside, Queens, New York City, US
- Coordinates: 40.742851°N 73.920021°W
- Owner: Various (1947–1977); see History
- Capacity: 2,500
- Type: Indoor arena

Construction
- Built: 1920s
- Opened: April 8, 1947
- Closed: June 24, 1977
- Demolished: December 1977

The Sunnyside Garden Arena (also known as Sunnyside Gardens) was an indoor boxing and wrestling arena at the southwest corner of Queens Boulevard and 45th Street in Sunnyside, Queens, New York City, US. Originally constructed in the 1920s as an indoor tennis court for the family of Jay Gould II, the building was converted to a fight venue and opened on April 8, 1947, with a seating capacity of approximately 2,500.

Across three decades, the arena hosted regular professional boxing cards alongside wrestling, roller derby, and labor and political events, and was a recurring host of rounds of the Daily News-sponsored Golden Gloves amateur tournament. Fighters who appeared at the venue included Vito Antuofermo, Tony Canzoneri, Gerry Cooney, Emile Griffith, Floyd Patterson, and José Torres; both Cooney and Antuofermo made their professional debuts at the arena. The DuMont Television Network aired a weekly program from the venue, Boxing from Sunnyside Gardens, from September 1949 to 1950, and Sunnyside cards continued to appear on local New York stations into the 1960s. A 2000 New York Times retrospective described the arena, alongside Manhattan's St. Nicholas Arena, as one of the "old, small fight clubs where young boxers could learn their trade." The arena was the site of an October 1960 campaign address by presidential candidate John F. Kennedy before a crowd of 4,000 inside the building and 8,000 in the streets outside.

The arena's last show was held on June 24, 1977, and the building was demolished that December. A Wendy's restaurant was subsequently constructed on the site. A memorial monument was installed in 2012, and in 2015 the New York City Council co-named the intersection of 45th Street and Queens Boulevard "Sunnyside Garden Arena Way". Sunnyside, a documentary film recounting the arena's history through interviews with former fighters and trainers, premiered in 2014.

== Architecture and design ==
The arena was a red-brick building at 44-16 Queens Boulevard, two blocks from the 46th Street–Bliss Street station of the New York City Subway's IRT Flushing Line (served by the modern-day 7 and <7> trains). The structure consisted of two parallel gables set perpendicular to the boulevard, fronted by a lower flat-roofed entry; a large clock above the main entrance faced the street. The 1972 Daily News described the venue as "tucked beneath a trestle for the Flushing Line on Queens Boulevard." A New York Times article the same year described the arena as having peeling paint, floors in need of waxing, and stands that were "precariously upright. Yet, despite the physical neglect of the hall, it is alive with fervent exuberance."

The hall was configured around a single ring, with bleacher seating around the floor and approximately 400 ringside seats. The arena accommodated approximately 2,500 seats in total. Dressing rooms were located in the basement at the rear of the building, in spaces that had previously served as the women's locker facilities of the original tennis club; the basement walls were of exposed concrete block, with separate rooms allocated to headliners and undercard fighters. Recollections by former fighters and contemporaneous press accounts described the interior atmosphere during boxing cards as densely packed and smoke-filled, with cigar and cigarette smoke gathering above the ring under the building's overhead lighting. The venue housed a bar at the front of the building and beer stands inside; according to a 1993 Newsday retrospective, fights among spectators were common during cards and informal betting was conducted in the bleachers.

== History ==
=== Origins (1920s–1947) ===
The building was constructed in 1926 as an indoor tennis court and carriage house for Jay Gould II. The Gould family later expanded its use into a private club whose well-to-do Manhattan members traveled to Queens to play tennis and badminton. In 1945, the Gould family sold the building for a reported $500,000 to Harry Jordan Lee, a Long Beach attorney and political leader, who partnered with the promoter Manny Heicklen, a former manager for the bandleader Vincent Lopez, to convert it into a boxing and wrestling venue. The arena opened on April 8, 1947, with a card headlined by Leo Milito's eight-round decision over Harry Diduck; the opening drew a crowd of 2,800 that included Queens Borough President James A. Burke. Lee subsequently sold his interest to Heicklen, who promoted fight cards and other events at the arena until his death in 1969.

=== Postwar boxing and television (1947–1968) ===
The arena hosted regular professional boxing cards and was a recurring site of the Daily News-sponsored Golden Gloves amateur tournament from the late 1940s onward. Beginning in September 1949, the DuMont Television Network broadcast a weekly program from the venue, Boxing from Sunnyside Gardens, which aired live on Thursday evenings until 1950. Matches from the arena continued to be televised into the 1960s as part of the Wrestling from Sunnyside Gardens program that aired on WOR (Channel 9) on Monday and Tuesday evenings.

In February 1958, after a period without regular pro cards, Heicklen restarted professional boxing at the venue with a six-bout program priced at $1 and $2, in line with an initiative by New York State Athletic Commission chairman Julius Helfand to support small fight clubs and develop young fighters.

A succession of matchmakers worked the venue's cards. Moe Fleischer was the matchmaker by the late 1950s, regularly programming bouts featuring the Cus D'Amato-trained middleweight José Torres. The manager and promoter Irving Cohen, best known as the manager of Rocky Graziano, took over Sunnyside matchmaking in the early 1960s; during the 1962–1963 New York newspaper strike he reported that Tuesday-night business held up despite the disruption to citywide boxing publicity, with five of the arena's first six 1963 cards drawing box-office receipts above $3,000 on attendance ranging from roughly 1,150 to 1,870. By the late 1960s the matchmaker was Duke Stefano, who served simultaneously as an assistant to Madison Square Garden matchmaker Teddy Brenner. By the early 1970s, the venue was being promoted by George Albert, a 77-year-old retired milliner known as "Broadway George" whose son Howard co-managed welterweight champion Emile Griffith; Gene Moore served as the arena's matchmaker from 1970 to 1973.

=== Decline (1968–1977) ===
The 1968 opening of the Felt Forum, a smaller theater within the new Madison Square Garden complex, drew much of the city's mid-card professional boxing away from the older neighborhood arenas, including comparable New York fight clubs such as Ridgewood Grove, the Broadway Arena, the Jamaica Arena, and the Eastern Parkway Arena. Even so, The Ring reported that the venue continued to operate at scale through the late 1960s; in the 1967–1968 boxing year, ten professional cards drew a combined 12,233 paying spectators and $37,558 in receipts, alongside fifteen Golden Gloves promotions that drew 31,500 amateur-bout attendees and $75,000.

After Heicklen's death in 1969, the arena passed to the promoter Mike Rosenberg of Sunnyside, who diversified the venue's programming to include wrestling, karate, bingo, and labor meetings as boxing attendance declined. By 1972, the arena was described as in decline as "an ugly, red brick relic... fighting for survival in a dormant sport" and one of the few surviving boxing clubs in New York City. In 1973 the arena closed for a few months. By July 1975, promoter Vic Manni was renovating the building in preparation for a planned September reopening, with the Madison Square Garden announcer Jack Brami signed as matchmaker. The venue reopened later that year with Manni and Nick Anesi as promoters. During the venue's final years, the promoters supplemented live cards with closed-circuit television screenings of major championship bouts, including the 1975 Thrilla in Manila between Muhammad Ali and Joe Frazier.

== Closure and demolition ==
By the venue's final years, rising operating costs and waning local interest had eroded its profitability; promoter Vic Manni later attributed the closure to a combination of the building's physical deterioration, a loss of money on boxing cards, and the absence of municipal support, telling Newsday in 1993 that "the city should have supported the place. It was a landmark." A 1977 increase in ringside ticket prices from $8 to $10 was reported to have further depressed attendance.

The arena's final boxing card was held on June 24, 1977. The main event was an eight-round decision by Ramon Ranquello of Jersey City over Bob Smith of Natchez; with no local fighters on the card, fewer than 400 people attended. Demolition of the building took place in December 1977. The Daily News subsequently reported that a payloader used in the demolition fell partway into the basement of the structure and was vandalized at the site, as was a second payloader sent to recover the first.

== Boxing and wrestling ==
=== Boxing ===
A December 1977 Daily News article on the venue's closing named Tony Canzoneri, Ruby Goldstein, Jimmy McLarnin, Billy Petrolle, and Al Singer among the major fighters who had appeared at the arena. Retrospective coverage in 1993 and 2012 additionally identified the local fighter Bobby Cassidy as well as Gerry Cooney, Emile Griffith, Eddie Mustafa Muhammad, and José Torres as having appeared on cards at Sunnyside Gardens. Cooney made his professional debut at the arena on February 15, 1977, defeating Bill Jackson by first-round knockout. Vito Antuofermo, later WBA middleweight champion, made his professional debut at the venue on November 30, 1971, defeating Ivelaw Eastman by four-round decision.

Other professional bouts at the venue included undercard appearances by the Argentine heavyweight Oscar Bonavena and three early-career fights by the actor Tony Danza, who began his career as a professional boxer. The arena was also the site of what proved to be the final bout of former world light-heavyweight champion Harold Johnson, who at the age of 44 was stopped on cuts in a comeback fight against Herschel Jacobs. The Long Island light-heavyweight Bobby Cassidy, nicknamed "the Shamrock Kid", made his professional debut at the arena on March 19, 1963, knocking out Bobby Noble of the Bronx in 38 seconds of the first round; he later became the WBC's number-one light-heavyweight contender in 1976 and fought 22 of his approximately 80 professional bouts at Sunnyside.

A 1970s bout billed as the "Civil Servants Championship of New York City" matched Jean-Claude Hessi, a New York City sanitation worker and former Golden Gloves champion, against Tony Gagliardi, a New York City Police Department detective making a comeback after a fight career in the 1950s. The bout, made by promoter Gene Moore, sold out the arena, with 1,701 spectators reported in attendance; sanitation workers in the crowd banged garbage-can lids in support of Hessi, who won on cuts after both of Gagliardi's eyes were opened.

The arena was a recurring host venue for the Daily News Golden Gloves amateur tournament. In February 1952, the venue hosted a quarterfinals card headlined by 17-year-old Floyd Patterson, the defending New York and Eastern Golden Gloves champion, in a tournament that culminated in the citywide finals at Madison Square Garden later that month. A decade later, in February 1962, a crowd of 2,179 watched Patterson's 19-year-old brother Ray Patterson, the defending New York Golden Gloves heavyweight Open champion, open his third Gloves campaign at the arena with a second-round knockout of Ronald Williams of the New York City Parks Department. The venue, alongside Manhattan's St. Nicholas Arena, was among the last neighborhood fight clubs in New York City to survive into the era of broadcast boxing.

=== Wrestling ===
According to the 1977 Daily News account, the arena hosted wrestling exhibitions by Ed "Strangler" Lewis, Jim Londos ("the Golden Greek"), Bruno Sammartino, and Stanislaus Zbyszko; later cards also featured Haystacks Calhoun and "Nature Boy" Buddy Rogers. The arena's programming also included roller derby.

== Political and cultural events ==
On the night of October 27, 1960, John F. Kennedy delivered a campaign address at the arena to the annual rally of the Queens County Democratic organization, less than two weeks before the presidential election. The speech, which began at 10:45 p.m. as the closing event of a daylong tour through every New York City borough except the Bronx, drew a crowd of 4,000 inside the arena and another 8,000 outside, according to a next-day report in The New York Times. Kennedy reached the Sunnyside venue after rallies in Manhattan, on Staten Island, and at the Eastern Parkway Arena in Brooklyn, and was described in next-day wire coverage as receiving a "tumultuous ovation" at Sunnyside Gardens. Kennedy criticized Vice President Richard Nixon's campaign claim of "unparalleled prosperity" and told the crowd that "after 24 years, it is time Queens went Democratic in a presidential election"; his campaign motorcade left the arena shortly after midnight bound for LaGuardia Airport and a flight to Bethlehem, Pennsylvania.

On October 31, 1952, a speaking program and political meeting at the arena included James Farley, Adlai Stevenson (then Governor of Illinois and Democratic nominee for President), and John Cashmore. Cashmore, Democratic candidate for State Senate, spoke first and was followed by Farley, who then introduced Stevenson. The speeches aired on television on WOR-TV (Channel 9). According to the 1977 Daily News account, Robert F. Kennedy also campaigned at the venue during his 1964 United States Senate run, and earlier political speakers at the arena had included Herbert Lehman, Franklin D. Roosevelt, and Al Smith.

The arena was also used for local community organizing. In October 1975, the United Communities Association, a coalition of community groups from northern Queens, convened a mass rally at the venue to press elected officials over what the coalition called the "determination to restore the residential character and quality of life" of the area's neighborhoods.

The film Mister Universe was filmed in part at the arena.

== Site today ==
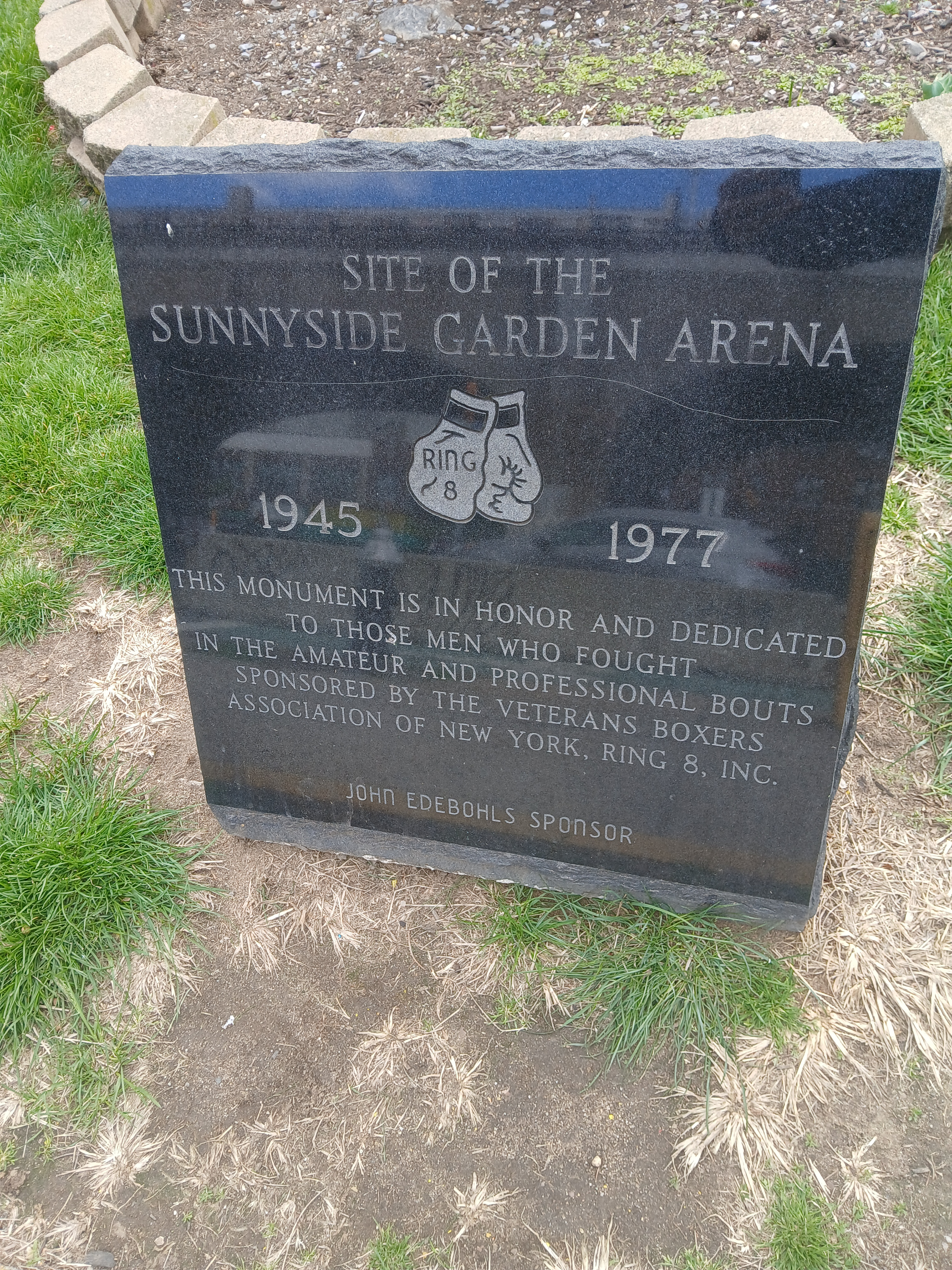
Memorial plaque at the site of the former arena, installed on October 6, 2012

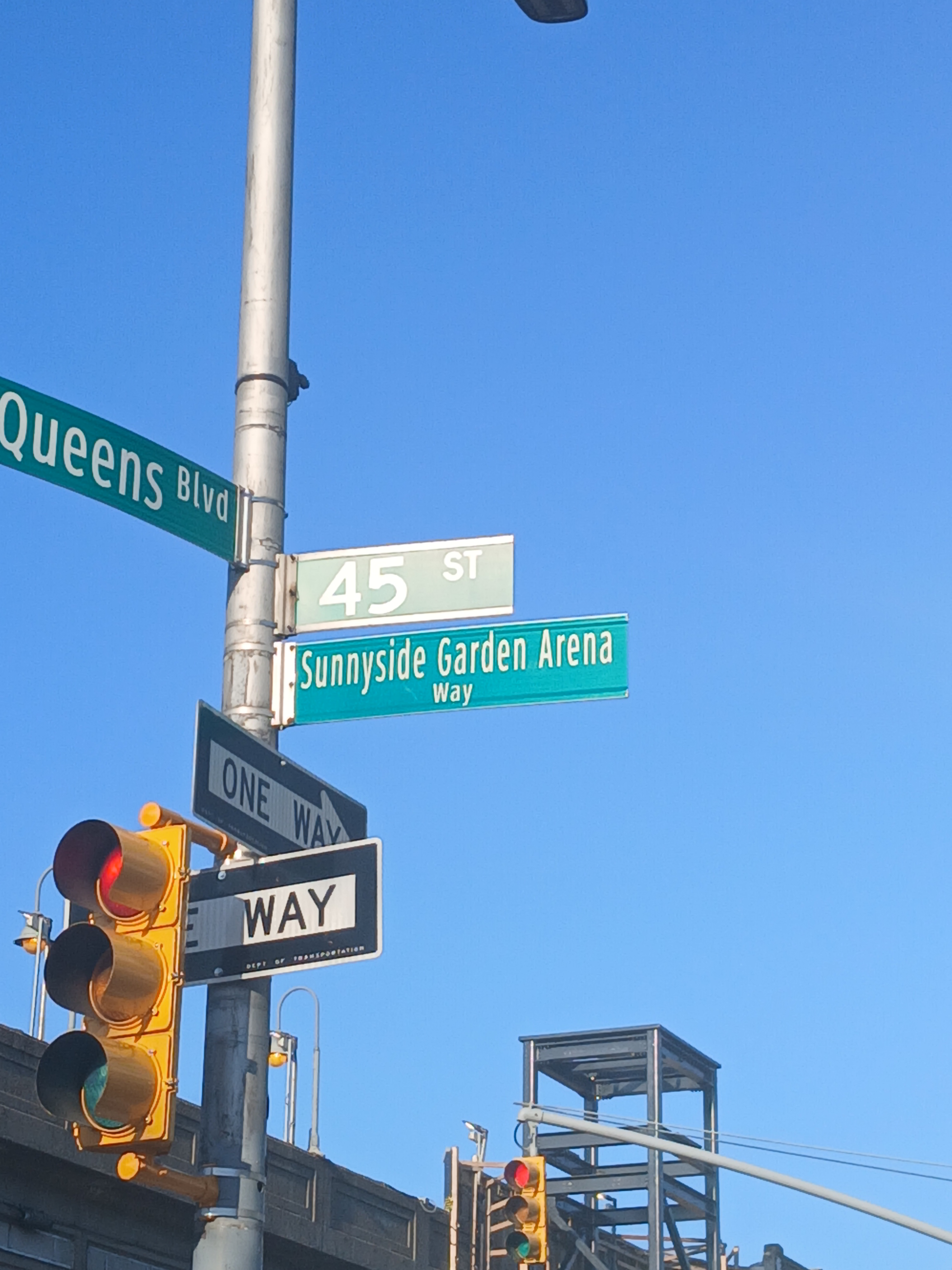
Co-named street sign for "Sunnyside Garden Arena Way" at the southwest corner of Queens Boulevard and 45th Street, designated by the City Council in 2015

Following the demolition, a Wendy's restaurant was constructed on the site operated by Wenco Food Systems Inc. of Jericho under a free-standing structure with parking for 42 cars. On October 6, 2012, the Ring 8 chapter of the Veteran Boxers Association installed a memorial monument and bronze plaque at the site in honor of the amateur and professional boxers who had fought at the arena; the plaque marks the venue's operating dates as 1945–1977. (Note: The 1945 date on the plaque corresponds to the Gould family's sale of the building to Harry Jordan Lee, who oversaw its conversion to a boxing venue. The arena's first professional boxing card was held on April 8, 1947.) The plaque was the result of a four-year organizing campaign by Ring 8 led by John Edebohls. A dedication ceremony for a co-named street sign was held at the site in September 2014, attended by Council Member Jimmy Van Bramer and members of the Ring 8 boxing-veterans organization. The co-naming of the intersection of 45th Street and Queens Boulevard as "Sunnyside Garden Arena Way" was enacted by the New York City Council as Local Law 15 of 2015, signed by Mayor Bill de Blasio on February 5, 2015.

== Legacy ==
The documentary film Sunnyside, directed by Chris Cassidy, recounted the arena's history through interviews with former fighters and trainers, including Gerry Cooney, Vito Antuofermo, Eddie Mustafa Muhammad, and Mustafa Hamsho, as well as U.S. Representative Peter T. King, who had grown up on 44th Street near the arena. The film was an official selection at the 2014 Shadow Box Film Festival, won the short-documentary award at the 2017 New York Short Film Festival, and was broadcast on SportsNet New York on March 18, 2018.

== See also ==
- Madison Square Garden Bowl
- St. Nicholas Arena

== Bibliography ==
- Brooks, Tim; Marsh, Earle (2007). The Complete Directory to Prime Time Network and Cable TV Shows, 1946–Present (9th ed.). Ballantine Books. ISBN 978-0-345-49773-4.
- Weinstein, David (2004). The Forgotten Network: DuMont and the Birth of American Television. Temple University Press. ISBN 978-1-59213-245-4.
