= Martin Short =

Canadian comedian and actor (born 1950)

Martin Short OC
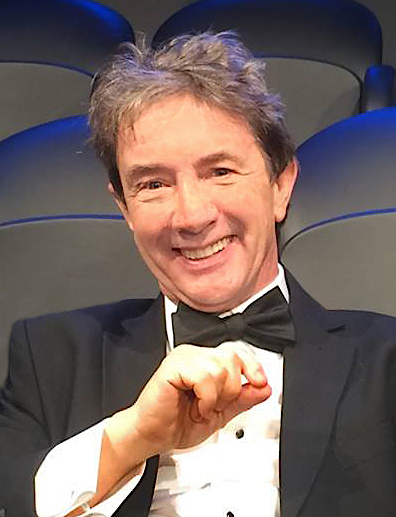
- Short in 2021
- Born: Martin Hayter Short; March 26, 1950 (age 76); Hamilton, Ontario, Canada
- Citizenship: Canada; United States; United Kingdom; Ireland
- Education: McMaster University (BA)
- Occupations: Comedian; actor; writer
- Notable work: Filmography
- Spouse: Nancy Dolman (m. 1980; died 2010)
- Children: 3

Comedy career
- Years active: 1972–present
- Medium: Film; television; theatre
- Genres: Improvisational comedy; surreal humour; musical comedy; physical comedy; sketch comedy; character comedy; insult comedy; satire
- Subjects: Canadian culture; current events; popular culture

Martin Hayter Short (born March 26, 1950) is a Canadian comedian, actor, singer, and writer. He is known as an energetic comedian who gained prominence for his roles in sketch comedy. He has also acted in numerous films and television shows. His awards include two Primetime Emmy Awards, two SAG Best Actor Awards, and a Tony Award. Short was made an officer of the Order of Canada in 2019.

Short is known for his work on the television programs SCTV and Saturday Night Live. He created the characters Jiminy Glick and Ed Grimley. He acted in the sitcom Mulaney (2014–2015), the variety series Maya & Marty (2016), and the drama series The Morning Show (2019). He has also had an active career on stage, starring in Broadway productions including Neil Simon's musicals The Goodbye Girl (1993) and Little Me (1998–1999). The latter earned him a Tony Award for Best Actor in a Musical and the former a nomination in the same category.

Short has acted in comedy films such as Three Amigos (1986), Innerspace (1987), Three Fugitives (1989), Father of the Bride (1991), Captain Ron (1992), Clifford (1994), Father of the Bride Part II (1995), Mars Attacks! (1996), Jungle 2 Jungle (1997), Mumford (1999), and The Santa Clause 3: The Escape Clause (2006). He voiced roles in The Pebble and the Penguin (1995), The Prince of Egypt (1998), Jimmy Neutron: Boy Genius (2001), Treasure Planet (2002), Madagascar 3: Europe's Most Wanted (2012), Frankenweenie (2012), and The Wind Rises (2013). He also voiced the Cat in the Hat in the PBS Kids series The Cat in the Hat Knows a Lot About That! (2010–2018).

In 2015, Short started touring nationally with the comedian Steve Martin. In 2018, they released their Netflix special An Evening You Will Forget for the Rest of Your Life, which received four Primetime Emmy Award nominations. Since 2021, Short has co-starred in the Hulu comedy series Only Murders in the Building with Martin and Selena Gomez. For his performance he has earned nominations for the Primetime Emmy Award, the Golden Globe Award, and a Critics' Choice Television Award, and won a SAG Award.

== Early life and education ==
Short was born Martin Hayter Short on March 26, 1950, in Hamilton, Ontario, the youngest of five children of Olive Grace (née Hayter), a Canadian-born concertmistress of the Hamilton Symphony Orchestra, and Charles Patrick Short, a corporate executive at the Canadian steel company Stelco, who had emigrated from Crossmaglen, Northern Ireland, as a stowaway during the Irish War of Independence. Short has described his father's heavy drinking.

Short and his siblings—David, Michael, Brian, and Nora—were raised as Catholics. His eldest brother, David, was killed in a car accident in Montreal in 1962, when Short was 12.

Encouraged by his mother in his early creative endeavours, Short attended Westdale Secondary School and graduated from McMaster University with a Bachelor of Arts degree in social work in 1971. His mother died of cancer in 1968, and his father died two years later of complications from a stroke.

His brother, Michael, became a comedy writer, also spending time at Second City Television (SCTV), and is a 17-time nominee and three-time winner of an Emmy Award for comedy sketch writing.

== Career ==
=== 1972–1976: Early theatrical and Canadian television work ===
Just as Short was about to graduate from McMaster University, he moved to Toronto to temporarily give acting a shot rather than immediately pursue a career in social work. Right away, in March 1972, he landed his first piece of paid work as an actor, playing a plastic credit card inside a woman's purse in a Chargex television commercial. He was then cast by Stephen Schwartz in the 1972 production of the Broadway hit Godspell at Toronto's Royal Alexandra Theatre. Among other members of that production's cast were Victor Garber, Gilda Radner, Eugene Levy, Dave Thomas, Andrea Martin, Jayne Eastwood, and Gerry Salsberg. Paul Shaffer was the musical director. As Short wrote in his 2014 memoir, he and Gilda Radner dated each other on and off during that time.

Short subsequently found work in several Canadian television shows and theatrical productions. These included being cast for the role of a tough and predatory prison inmate in the 1972 staging of John Herbert's drama Fortune and Men's Eyes. Appearing in this role involved the 21-year-old actor commuting to and from his hometown of Hamilton. By late 1972, with the success of Godspell at the Royal Alexandra Theatre in downtown Toronto, the production moved uptown to the Bayview Playhouse where it ran for 488 performances. Short's increased stage profile led to a guest spot on Right On, a teen-focused live program airing weekly in the after-school timeslot on the government-funded CBC TV. He also played the role of Smokey the Hare on the TVOntario daytime kids' program Cucumber.

In June 1973, with Godspell winding down and Chicago's Second City improv comedy theatre starting up a sister company in Toronto, many of Short's Godspell peers, including Radner, Levy, Eastwood, Salsberg, Valri Bromfield and Dan Aykroyd, joined the new troupe's first cast. Short resisted auditioning due to feeling a "phobia of being funny on demand" and considered himself a "traditional song-and-dance performer".

In 1974, Short was hired as a writer on Everything Goes, a nightly variety show hosted by Norm Crosby, Mike Darow and Catherine McKinnon. Produced and aired on the newly launched Global Television Network, the show was broadcast only to the Southern Ontario region and lasted less than six months before being cancelled.

=== 1977–1985: SCTV and SNL stardom ===
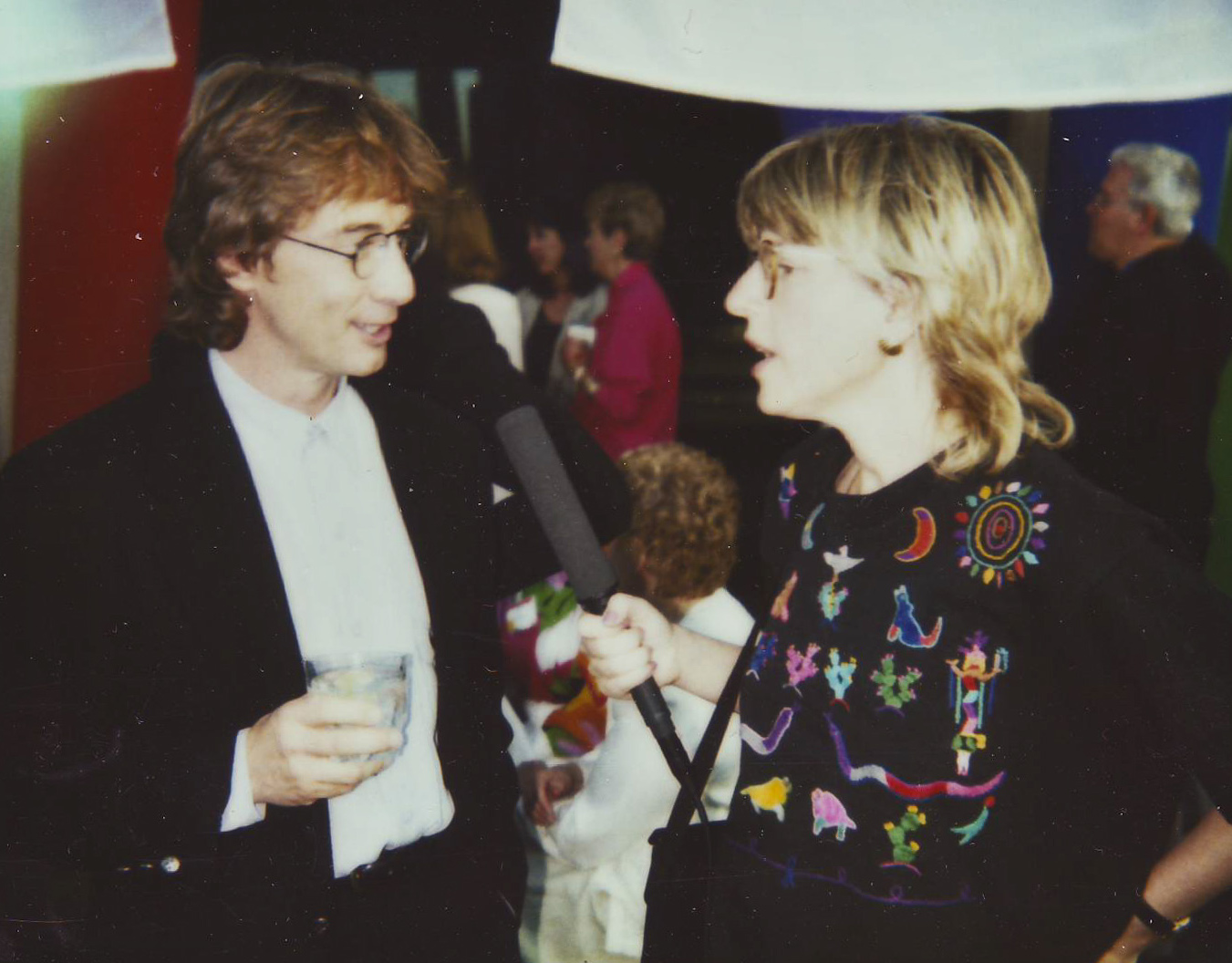
Short during his early career

Short was encouraged to pursue comedy by McMaster classmates Eugene Levy and Dave Thomas. In March 1977, Short joined the improvisation group the Second City in Toronto, taking over from John Candy in The Wizard of Ossington, their ninth revue.

In early 1978, Short secured his feature film debut via a supporting role in the Melvin Frank-directed British romantic comedy, Lost and Found, starring George Segal and Glenda Jackson. Filmed throughout the late winter and early spring of 1978 in Banff National Park and Toronto, the film saw a limited North American release in June 1979 and was met with lukewarm reviews and poor box office returns.

In 1979, after working solely in Canada for the previous seven years, Short landed a starring role in the American sitcom The Associates, about a group of novice lawyers working at a Wall Street law firm.

In 1980, he joined the cast of I'm a Big Girl Now, a sitcom starring Diana Canova and Danny Thomas. Canova was offered the sitcom because of her success playing Corinne Tate Flotsky on ABC's Soap and left Soap shortly before Short's newlywed wife Nancy Dolman joined it.

SCTV

Short achieved wider public notice when the Toronto Second City group produced a show for television, Second City Television (SCTV), which ran for several years in Canada and then later in the United States. Appearing on SCTV in 1982–83, Short developed several characters before moving on to Saturday Night Live for the 1984–85 season:

- Aged songwriter Irving Cohen, previously thought to be loosely based on American composers Irving Caesar and/or Irving Berlin and perhaps Canadian songwriter Leonard Cohen, but actually (according to Short in his autobiography) inspired by Sophie Tucker
- Defense attorney Nathan Thurm
- Albino Vegas singer Jackie Rogers Jr. and his father, Jackie Rogers Sr., the latter of whom was mauled to death by a mountain lion during a comeback special that took place in the woods.
- Oddball man-child Ed Grimley, later featured on SNL and in his own short-lived animated television series, The Completely Mental Misadventures of Ed Grimley. The show, which was produced by Hanna-Barbera, aired for a single season in the fall of 1988 and remains the only animated series adapted from both an SCTV and Saturday Night Live character to date.

Saturday Night Live

Short joined Saturday Night Live (SNL) for the 1984–85 season. He helped revive the show with his many characters for season ten, the last season produced by Dick Ebersol. "Short's appearance on SNL helped to revive the show's fanbase, which had flagged after the departure of Eddie Murphy, and in turn, would launch his successful career in films and television." His SNL characters included numerous holdovers from his SCTV days, most notably Ed Grimley, a geeky everyman who is obsessed with Wheel of Fortune, plays the triangle, and often finds himself in bizarre situations. He also did impressions of such celebrities as Jerry Lewis and Katharine Hepburn.

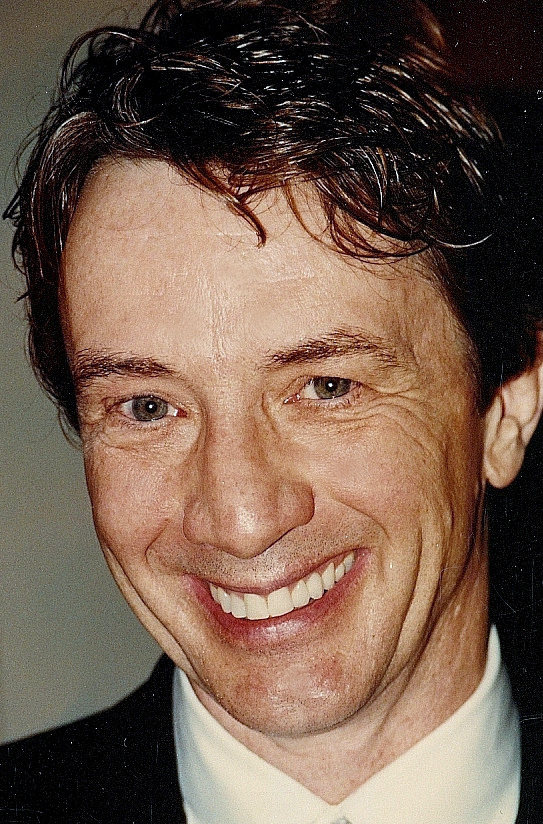
Short in 2001

Since then he has made multiple appearances on the show, including the SNL Christmas specials in 2012 and 2024 and Saturday Night Live 40th Anniversary Special in 2015.

=== 1986–1999: TV specials, film roles and Broadway debut ===
In addition to his work on SCTV and SNL, Short has starred in several television specials and series. In 1985, he starred in the one-hour Showtime special Martin Short: Concert for the North Americas. This was Short's first live concert, interspersed with studio sketches and a wraparound featuring Jackie Rogers Jr. Co-produced by the CBC, it aired as The Martin Short Comedy Special in Canada in March 1986. In 1989, Short headlined another one-hour comedy special for HBO called I, Martin Short, Goes Hollywood, a sendup of all things Hollywood. It featured many of his characters, including Ed Grimley and Jackie Rogers Jr. In 1994, Short hosted the television show The Martin Short Show and in 1995 a sketch comedy show, The Show Formerly Known as the Martin Short Show. In 1998, he played the character Frik in the TV miniseries Merlin. In 1999, he appeared as Lionel Dillard in Lawrence Kasdan's comedy-drama Mumford. The syndicated version of The Martin Short Show ran from 1999 to 2000.

Short starred in films such as Three Amigos (1986), Innerspace (1987), The Big Picture (1989), Three Fugitives (1989; directed by Francis Veber and starring Nick Nolte and James Earl Jones), Pure Luck (1991; directed by Nadia Tass, starring Danny Glover and Sheila Kelley), Captain Ron (1992), and Clifford (1994). Short was also the memorable scene-stealing character "Franck" in the 1991 remake of Father of the Bride and its sequel in 1995.

In 1996, he appeared in Tim Burton's sci-fi comedy Mars Attacks! as the lascivious press secretary Jerry Ross. In 1997, he starred in A Simple Wish as male fairy godmother Murray. Also in 1997, he appeared as Wall Street broker Richard Kempster in Jungle 2 Jungle with Tim Allen.

Short continued to work in the theatre, playing a lead role on Broadway in the 1993 musical version of the Neil Simon film The Goodbye Girl, receiving a Tony Award nomination and an Outer Critics Circle Award. He had the lead role in the 1999 Broadway revival of the musical Little Me, for which he received a Tony Award and another Outer Critics Circle Award.

=== 2000–2007: Primetime Glick ===
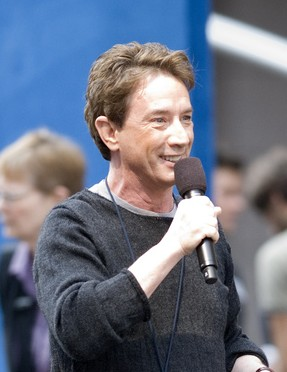
Short hosting Broadway on Broadway, 2006

Short starred as Jiminy Glick on Comedy Central's Primetime Glick (2001–2003), where he interviewed performers and celebrities as the character Jiminy Glick. The New York Times in 2002 called Glick "the most unpredictable and hilariously uninhibited comic creation to hit TV since Bart Simpson was in diapers." In 2004, he wrote and starred in Jiminy Glick in Lalawood with Jan Hooks as his wife, Dixie Glick. In 2003, Short took to the stage again in the critically acclaimed Los Angeles run of The Producers. He played the accountant, Leo Bloom, opposite Jason Alexander's Max Bialystock. Although the role of Leo Bloom was originated on Broadway by Matthew Broderick, Mel Brooks first approached Short about doing the part opposite Nathan Lane. Short has said that, while he was thrilled by the opportunity, the idea of having to move his family from their Los Angeles home to New York for a year ultimately proved a deal-breaker.

In 2006, he starred in another film with Tim Allen, The Santa Clause 3: The Escape Clause. In addition to his own series, Short has guest starred on several shows including Arrested Development (episode titled "Ready, Aim, Marry Me!", 2005), Muppets Tonight (1996), Law & Order: Special Victims Unit, and Weeds. He joined the FX drama Damages as lawyer Leonard Winstone in 2010. Short also provided the voices of several animated film characters, such as Stubbs in We're Back! A Dinosaur's Story (1993), Hubie in The Pebble and the Penguin (1995), Huy in The Prince of Egypt (1998), Ooblar in Jimmy Neutron: Boy Genius (2001), B.E.N. in Treasure Planet (2002), Preminger in Barbie as the Princess and the Pauper (2004), Thimbletack the Brownie in The Spiderwick Chronicles (2008), Mr. Frankenstein/Mr. Bergermesiter/Nassor in Frankenweenie (2012), Stefano the sea lion in Madagascar 3: Europe's Most Wanted (2012), Kurokawa in the English dub of Hayao Miyazaki's The Wind Rises (2013), and The Jester in Legends of Oz: Dorothy's Return (2013).

Short was the host of the now defunct Walt Disney World attraction O Canada!, a Circle-Vision 360° film in the Canada pavilion of Disney's Epcot theme park. He also hosted a 15-minute film about how pregnancy occurs in "The Making of Me" at Epcot's Wonders of Life pavilion.

Short performed in his satirical one-man show (with a cast of six), Martin Short: Fame Becomes Me, at the Bernard B. Jacobs Theatre on Broadway. The show toured several cities in the spring of 2006 before opening on Broadway in August of that year and closing in January 2007. In it, he performed his classic characters Grimley, Cohen, and Glick. As Glick, Short brought a member of the audience (usually a celebrity) on stage and interviewed them. Jerry Seinfeld was the guest on opening night. The show also featured parodies of many celebrities, including Celine Dion, Katharine Hepburn, Elizabeth Taylor, Richard Burton, Tommy Tune, Joan Rivers, Britney Spears, Ellen DeGeneres, Renée Zellweger, Jodie Foster, Rachael Ray, and Short's wife, Nancy Dolman. The cast album was released on April 10, 2007, and is available from Ghostlight Records, an imprint of Sh-K-Boom Records.

=== 2010–2019: Stand-up tour with Steve Martin ===
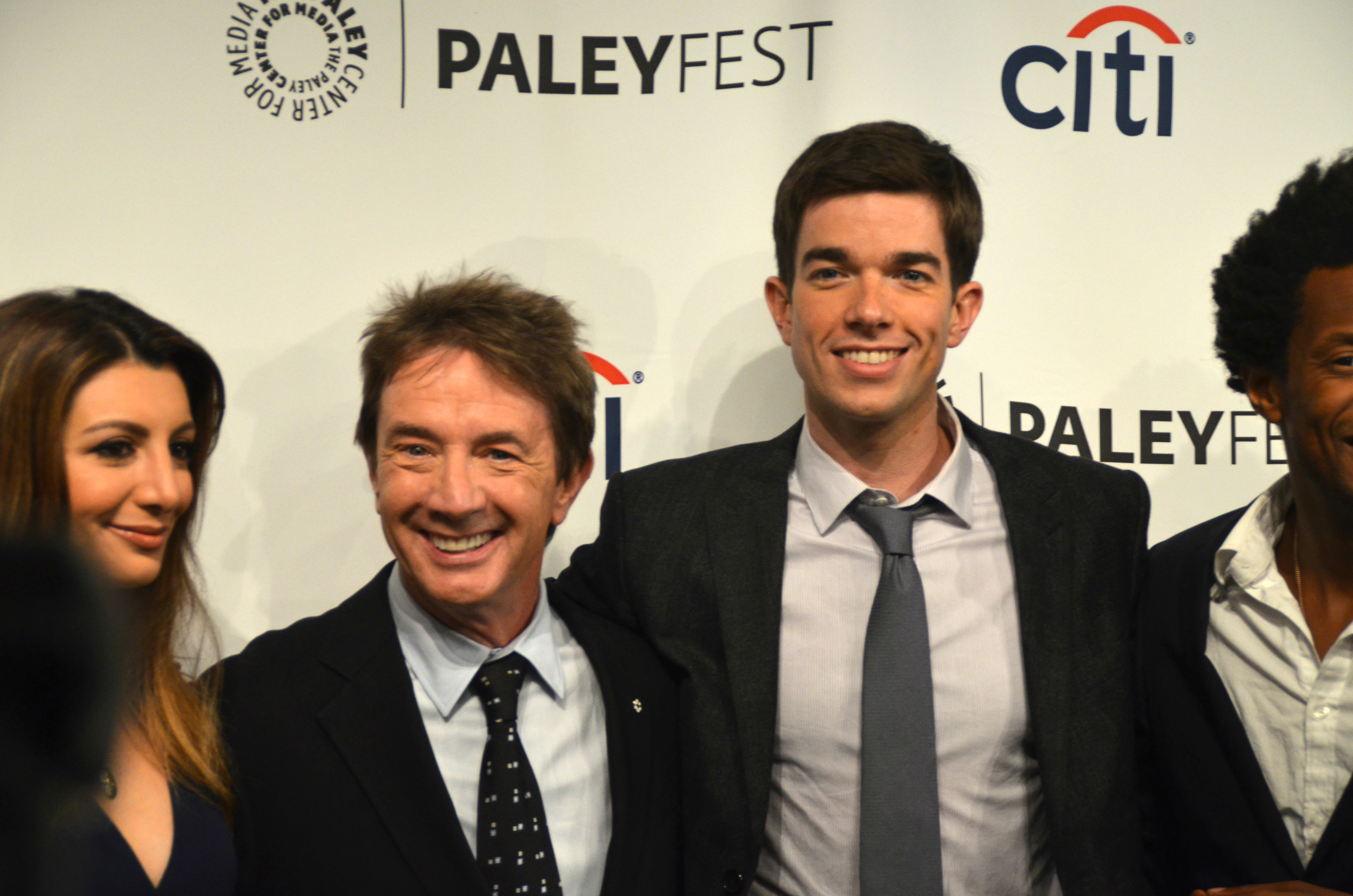
Short with John Mulaney and Nasim Pedrad at PaleyFest in 2014

Short voiced the Cat in the Hat in the animated TV series The Cat in the Hat Knows a Lot About That!, which aired from 2010 to 2013. He later voiced the character in a number of related TV specials in 2014 and 2016. He shot a new comedy special for television in Toronto in September 2011. The special, I, Martin Short, Goes Home, follows his return to his native Hamilton, Ontario, and has a cast that includes Eugene Levy, Andrea Martin, Joe Flaherty, and Fred Willard. The special aired on CBC Television on April 3, 2012, and garnered Short a nomination for Best Lead Actor in a Comedy Program or Series at the 1st Canadian Screen Awards. In 2011, Short joined the cast of How I Met Your Mother for its seventh season, playing Marshall's manic boss, and was a judge on the first season of Canada's Got Talent (2012).

Short, Steve Martin, and Chevy Chase appeared on an episode of Saturday Night Live as part of the "Five-Timers Club", on March 9, 2013, which included those actors who had hosted the show five or more times. Short appeared as a waiter, as he had only hosted three times.

Short has continued to tour in his one-man show, which features many of his best-loved characters and sketches. In addition to Fame Becomes Me, some titles Short has used for his show include Stroke Me Lady Fame, If I'd Saved, I Wouldn't Be Here, and Sunday in the Park with George Michael. Short's memoir, covering his 40-year career in show business, I Must Say: My Life as a Humble Comedy Legend, was released on November 4, 2014.

From 2014 to 2015, he starred in the Fox sitcom Mulaney, as Lou Cannon, a game show host and boss of the title character John Mulaney. In 2015, he returned to Broadway, replacing Nathan Lane in the Terrence McNally comedic play It's Only a Play. On May 31, 2016, Short debuted a new variety show on NBC, Maya & Marty, which also starred Maya Rudolph.

Since 2015, Short has toured with the comedian Steve Martin. Together their tours have included A Very Stupid Conversation in 2015, An Evening You Will Forget for the Rest of Your Life in 2017, and The Funniest Show in Town at the Moment in 2021. Their 2017 tour was filmed for Netflix as a special and was nominated for four Primetime Emmy Awards and a Directors Guild of America Award.

=== 2019–present: Only Murders in the Building and acclaim ===
In 2019, Short appeared on the Netflix talk show Comedians in Cars Getting Coffee alongside Jerry Seinfeld in the episode "Martin Short: A Dream World Of Residuals". From 2019 to 2021, he played Dick Lundy, a disgraced filmmaker, in the Apple TV+ series The Morning Show. Damon Wise of Deadline Hollywood wrote, "Short is a damn fine dramatic actor", citing his "brief but indelible guest role". Short said of the role, "it came to me by the producers reaching out and asking me to do it. I don't know why they wanted me, necessarily, but I was immediately interested. I'm very fascinated by conversation and discussion" around the MeToo movement. The performance earned Short a nomination for the Primetime Emmy Award for Outstanding Guest Actor in a Drama Series. He also appeared as a Leprechaun in the Apple TV+ series Schmigadoon! from 2021 to 2023. Short voiced the roles of Grandpa Frump in The Addams Family (2019) and Father Willoughby in the Netflix animated film The Willoughbys (2020) as the impolite father. He also reprised the role of Franck Eggelhoffer in the Nancy Meyers-directed short film Father of the Bride Part 3(ish) (2020).

Starting in 2021, he has starred and served as an executive producer in the Hulu crime comedy series Only Murders in the Building alongside Steve Martin and Selena Gomez. The show was nominated for a 2021 Peabody Award, and in July 2022, he received his 13th Emmy nomination for his role in it. He received nominations for the Primetime Emmy Awards for Outstanding Comedy Series and Outstanding Lead Actor in a Comedy Series. Mike Hale of The New York Times wrote that Short "gives a master class" in the series adding, "It's not a class in acting or comedy so much as it is a seminar in agelessness and professionalism, and in Short's unmatched ability to turn self-absorption into a virtue." In 2023, he voiced the role of Kingfish in Aquaman and the Lost Kingdom. In 2024, he reprised his role as Jiminy Glick on Real Time with Bill Maher and guest hosted Jimmy Kimmel Live.

Starting in June 2025, Short took over as the host for Match Game on ABC, replacing Alec Baldwin. In 2026, he was featured in the Netflix documentary Marty, Life Is Short.

== Personal life ==
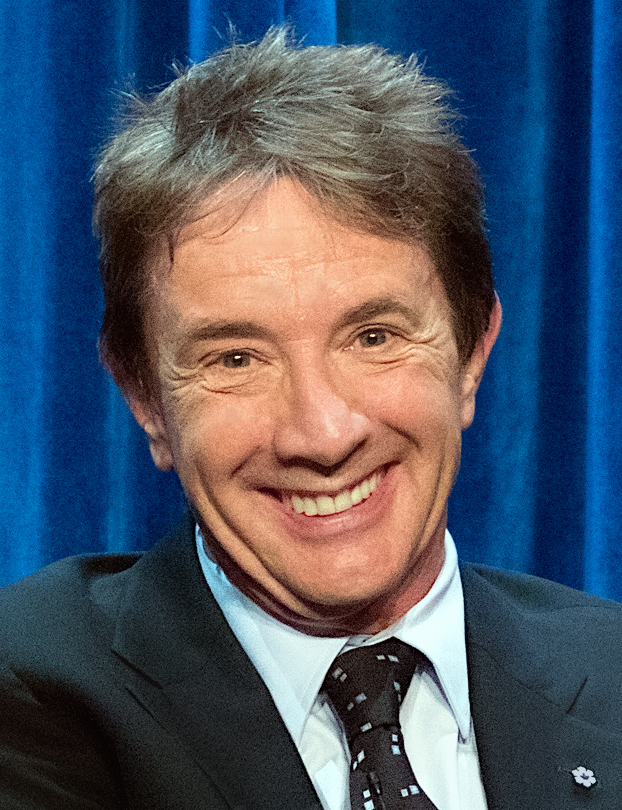
Short at PaleyFest in 2014

Short met Canadian comic actress Nancy Dolman in 1972 during the run of Godspell. The couple married in 1980. Dolman retired from show business in 1985 to be a stay-at-home mother and raise their family. Short and Dolman adopted three children: Katherine, Oliver, and Henry. Dolman died of ovarian cancer on August 21, 2010. Two years later, while promoting Madagascar 3 on The Today Show, host Kathie Lee Gifford asked Short on-air about his marriage to Dolman in the present tense, unaware that Dolman had died. Rather than correct Gifford, Short simply noted that they were together for 36 years and that he was "madly in love" with her. Gifford later issued a public apology, which Short accepted.

As of April 2024 Short and his family lived in Pacific Palisades, Los Angeles. As of 2018, Short also owned a home on Lake Rosseau in Ontario. He is a naturalized U.S. citizen but retains Canadian citizenship, as well as Irish and British citizenship.

Nancy Dolman's brother, screenwriter/director Bob Dolman (who served as a part of Second City Television (SCTV)'s Emmy-winning writing team alongside Short), married their close friend and colleague Andrea Martin, also in 1980. Short is uncle to the couple's two sons, Jack and Joe. Bob Dolman and Andrea Martin divorced in 2004. Short is a first cousin of Clare Short, a former member of the British Parliament and former British cabinet minister.

Short's daughter Katherine died by suicide on February 23, 2026, at the age of 42. Speaking publicly about her death in October 2026, Short said: "Katherine fought for so long with extreme mental health issues, borderline personality, other things. And she did the best she could until she couldn't ... Mental health is simply an illness, not to be hidden in the shadows or perceived as a family embarrassment. The loss will be devastating to my soul for as long as I live. The great Dolly Parton once said 'grief is love with no place to go.' My pain about losing my daughter will always be present in my heart and I think that's simply because what we deeply love, we can never lose. For all that we love deeply becomes a part of us."

He is a fan of his hometown team, the Hamilton Tiger-Cats of the Canadian Football League.

== Philanthropy ==
Short appeared in a 2001 episode on the Celebrity Who Wants to Be a Millionaire hosted by Regis Philbin, winning $32,000 for his charity, Loyola High School.

He has actively campaigned for the Women's Research Cancer Fund, and he accepted a "Courage Award" on behalf of his late wife at a 2011 gala by the group. Short is also a member of the Canadian charity Artists Against Racism.

In 2013, a commemorative three-dollar (face value) Canadian coin, designed by Canadian artist Tony Bianco in consultation with Short, displaying the actor's summer home on Lake Rosseau in the Muskoka region of Ontario, with the head of Queen Elizabeth II, as at 77 years of age, bare headed, on the obverse side, was issued by the Royal Canadian Mint.

== Acting credits and accolades ==
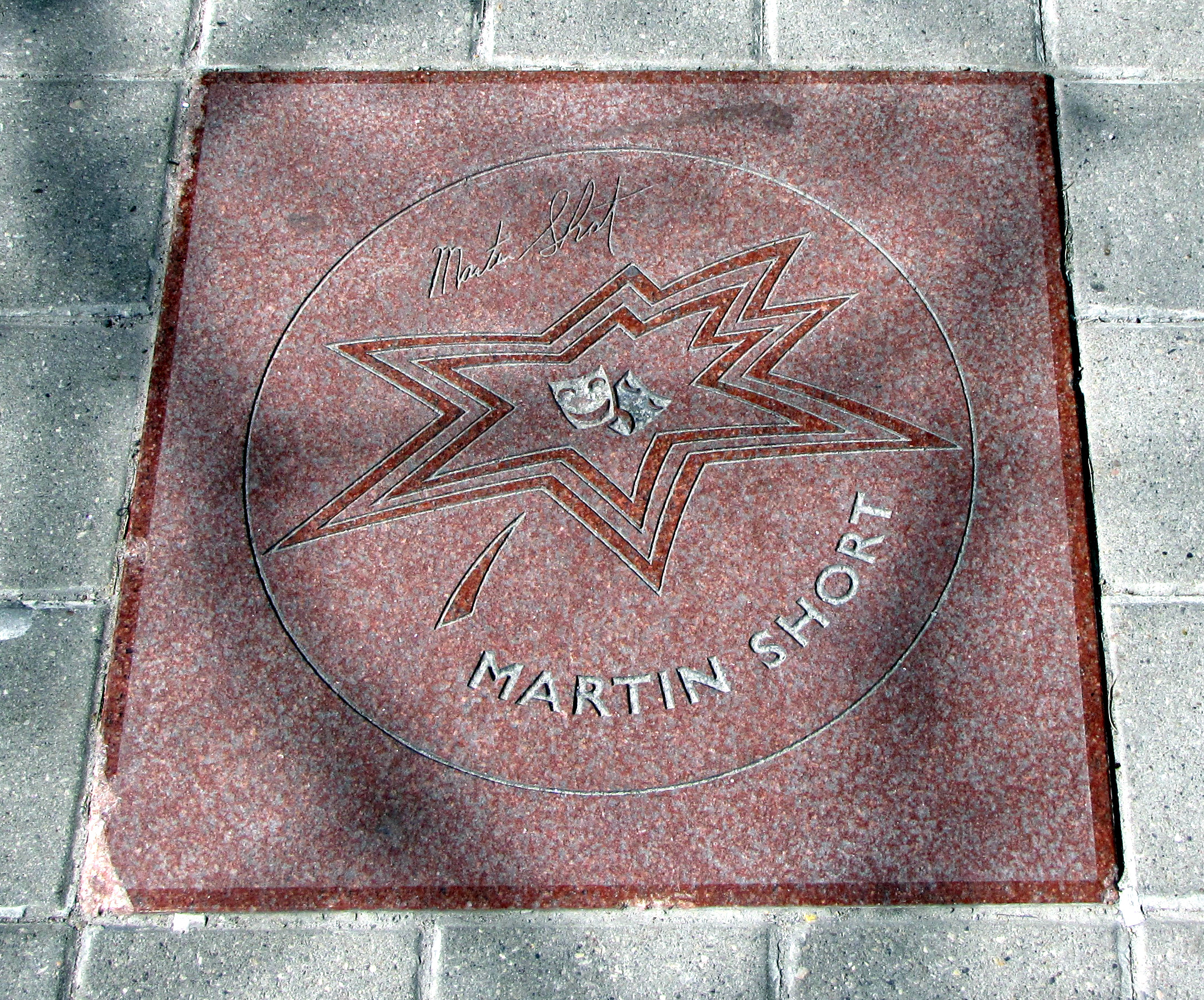
Short's star on Canada's Walk of Fame

Short's accolades include two Tony Award nominations, winning for Little Me in 1999. Short also has received sixteen Primetime Emmy Award nominations, winning twice for Outstanding Writing for a Variety Series for SCTV (1983), and AFI Life Achievement award: Mel Brooks (2014). In 2014, Short received the Robert Altman Award from Independent Spirit Awards alongside the cast of Paul Thomas Anderson's Inherent Vice.

Short has received various honours from Canada. In 1995, Short received the Earl Grey Lifetime Achievement Award. In 1999, he earned the Sir Peter Ustinov Award at the Banff Television Festival. Short was honoured with a star on Canada's Walk of Fame in 2000 and received a second star there in 2002 as part of the comedic group Second City Television (SCTV). In 2001, he was awarded an honorary Doctor of Literature by McMaster University. Short has also received Medals from Queen Elizabeth II, including in 2002 the Queen Elizabeth II Golden Jubilee Medal and in 2012 the Queen Elizabeth II Diamond Jubilee Medal. In 2015, a stamp of Short was issued by Canada Post. In 2016, he received the Canadian Screen Awards Lifetime Achievement Award. In 2019, Short became an Officer of the Order of Canada.

== Bibliography ==
- I Must Say: My Life as a Humble Comedy Legend (2014, autobiography)
