= Dancing at the Blue Iguana =

- Theatrical release poster
- Directed by: Michael Radford
- Written by: Michael Radford; David Linter
- Produced by: Michael Radford; Sheila Kelley; Damian Jones; Graham Broadbent; Etchie Stroh; Ram Bergman; Dana Lustig
- Starring: Charlotte Ayanna; Daryl Hannah; Sheila Kelley; Elias Koteas; Vladimir Mashkov; Sandra Oh; Jennifer Tilly; Robert Wisdom
- Cinematography: Ericson Core
- Edited by: Roberto Perpignani
- Music by: Tal Bergman; Renato Neto
- Distributed by: Lions Gate Entertainment
- Release date: September 14, 2000 (TIFF)
- Running time: 123 minutes
- Country: United States
- Languages: English; Russian
- Box office: $67,913

Dancing at the Blue Iguana is a 2000 American erotic drama film, directed by Michael Radford, about the lives of strippers at a strip club in Los Angeles, California's San Fernando Valley. The film was based on an improvisational workshop involving the lead actors. It explores the intersecting lives of five exotic dancers who work at the Blue Iguana and the difficulties in their lives. The film was released on September 14, 2000, at the Toronto International Film Festival.

== Plot ==
Angel (Daryl Hannah) wishes for a baby of her own or a foster child to take care of, but her messy, dysfunctional existence makes this an impossible dream. Jo (Jennifer Tilly) is pregnant, wants an abortion, and can barely contain her rage at the world, which is useful in her moonlighting as a dominatrix. Jasmine (Sandra Oh) writes beautiful poetry on the side and finally finds a boyfriend. She reveals to him that she is a stripper, and he maintains that he can accept that. However, once he sees her dance at the club, he disapproves silently and leaves. Jesse (Charlotte Ayanna) is the youngest and newest stripper who looks for acceptance and love among the strippers and customers. She is eventually beaten by her boyfriend which leads her to alcohol abuse and depression. Stormy (Sheila Kelley) is having an incestuous relationship with her brother.

== Companion documentary ==
In 2001, Daryl Hannah released a one-hour companion documentary, Strip Notes, based on her experience researching her role as a stripper in the film. It is included on the Dancing at the Blue Iguana DVD. It features all of the lead actresses in the film as well as Elias Koteas.

== Cast ==
- Sandra Oh as Jasmine
- Charlotte Ayanna as Jessie
- Kristin Bauer as Nico
- W. Earl Brown as Bobby
- Daryl Hannah as Angel
- Chris Hogan as Dennis
- Sheila Kelley as Stormy
- Elias Koteas as Sully
- Vladimir Mashkov as Sacha
- Rodney Rowland as Charlie
- Jennifer Tilly as Jo
- Robert Wisdom as Eddie

== Production ==
To prepare for her role, Daryl Hannah spent every night for a month at the Crazy Girls strip club on seedy Sunset Strip learning the stripping art.

== Reception ==
On the review aggregator website Rotten Tomatoes, 22% of 23 critics' reviews are positive, with an average rating of 4.6/10. Metacritic, which uses a weighted average, assigned the film a score of 41 out of 100, based on eight critics, indicating "mixed or average" reviews.

Notable positive reviews included critics Roger Ebert and Richard Roeper who gave it two thumbs up, complimenting Oh and Hannah on Ebert and Roeper. Likewise, critic Kevin Thomas gave a positive review in the Los Angeles Times, and Stephen Holden wrote a somewhat positive review in The New York Times.
