= Love the Hard Way =

2001 film by Peter Sehr

- DVD cover
- Directed by: Peter Sehr
- Written by: Shuo Wang; Peter Sehr; Marie Noelle
- Produced by: Wolfram Tichy
- Starring: Adrien Brody; Charlotte Ayanna
- Cinematography: Guy Dufaux
- Edited by: Christian Nauheimer
- Music by: Dahoud Darien
- Distributed by: Vine International Pictures
- Release dates: August 8, 2001 (Locarno Film Festival); March 27, 2003 (Germany); June 6, 2003 (United States)
- Running time: 104 minutes
- Countries: Germany; United States
- Languages: English; Spanish; German; French; Russian
- Box office: $111,350

Love the Hard Way is a 2001 crime drama film directed by Peter Sehr. The story revolves around a petty thief who brings an innocent young woman into his world of crime while she teaches him the lessons of enjoying life and being loved.

The film was written by Peter Sehr and is based on the novel Yi Ban Shi Huo Yan, Yi Ban Shi Hai Shui by Chinese writer Wang Shuo, although Sehr transported the film's story to New York City.

== Cast ==
- Adrien Brody as Jack
- Charlotte Ayanna as Claire
- Jon Seda as Charlie
- Pam Grier as Linda
- August Diehl as Jeff
- Liza Jessie Peterson as Pamela
- Elizabeth Regen as Sue
- Katherine Moennig as Debbie
- Joey Kern as Fitzgerald
- Jonathan Hadary as Boris
- Michaela Conlin as Cara
- James Saito as Ahiri

== Reception ==
On the review aggregator website Rotten Tomatoes, 28% of 43 critics' reviews are positive. The website's consensus reads: "Love the Hard Way pits an intriguing ensemble against a cliché-riddled storyline, and the actors lose -- along with the audience." Metacritic, which uses a weighted average, assigned the film a score of 42 out of 100, based on 20 critics, indicating "mixed or average" reviews.

Lisa Schwarzbaum of Entertainment Weekly wrote, "Adrien Brody completists will appreciate Love the Hard Way, if only as an example of the kind of self-conscious, brat-noir projects their man probably won't be doing anymore."

Roger Ebert of the Chicago Sun-Times gave the film three out of four stars and wrote, "[A]s character studies of Jack and Claire, it is daring and inventive, and worthy of comparison with the films of a French master of criminal psychology like Jean-Pierre Melville."
