= Charlotte Ayanna =

Miss Teen USA 1993

- Born: Charlotte Lopez; San Juan, Puerto Rico
- Occupations: Actress, beauty queen
- Years active: 1995–2012, 2023–present
- Beauty pageant titleholder
- Title: Miss Vermont Teen USA 1993; Miss Teen USA 1993

Charlotte Ayanna (born Charlotte Lopez) is an American actress, author and beauty queen who was crowned Miss Teen USA 1993.

== Early life ==
Charlotte Lopez was born in San Juan, Puerto Rico, but moved to Vermont at an early age. She had a troubled childhood, spending sixteen years in foster homes after her mother, Emma, was judged to be mentally unfit to look after her children.

In 1994, at age 17, she was adopted into a foster home.

== Career ==
Her first national exposure was in 1993, when she became Miss Teen USA.

Following her pageant career, she worked with author Susan Dworkin to write a book, Lost in the System (1996), about her experiences as a foster child and pageant winner.

Ayanna then transitioned into acting, making guest appearances on episodes of various television series, including three episodes of Weird Science and one episode of Entourage. Her first acting credit, after changing her name to Charlotte Ayanna, was her appearance in an October 1998 episode of Profiler. She also appeared in the music video for fellow Puerto Rican Ricky Martín's hit "She's All I Ever Had".

Her film roles include: a brief appearance as dead high schooler Liz Purr in Jawbreaker (1999); The Rage: Carrie 2 (1999); a stripper in Dancing at the Blue Iguana (2000); Love the Hard Way (2003) with Adrien Brody; and a sexy vampiress in the horror direct-to-video movie The Insatiable (2007). Her last known acting role was in the film Christmas in Compton (2012). Penultimately she was in Rain from Stars, filmed in 2010 but not released until 2013.

== Personal life ==
After her pageant career ended and her book had been published, she chose to change her surname from Lopez to Ayanna, which she states means "blessed" in Cherokee.

== Filmography ==
=== Film ===
Year	Title	Role	Notes
1997	Trojan War	Nina	
1998	Telling You	Allison Fazio	
1999	Jawbreaker	Elizabeth "Liz" Purr	
1999	The Rage: Carrie 2	Tracy	
2000	Dancing at the Blue Iguana	Jessie	
2001	Stealing Time	Samantha "Sam" Parkes	a.k.a. Rennie's Landing
2001	Love the Hard Way	Claire Harrison	
2001	Training Day	Lisa	
2001	Kate & Leopold	Patrice	
2002	Spun	Amy	
2005	Once Upon a Wedding	Margarita	
2006	Push	Lisa	
2006	The Push	Macey	
2006	No. 6	Mila	Short film
2006	The Insatiable	Tatiana	Direct-to-video
2010	Errand boy	Candi	Short film
2012	Christmas in Compton	Ginger	
2013	Rain from Stars	Nora	Completed in 2010
TBA	The American Way		

=== Television ===
Year	Title	Role	Notes
1995–1996	Weird Science	Annie/Jessie/Wendy	3 episodes
1996	Beverly Hills, 90210	Beth Rawlings	Episode: "Here We Go Again"
1996	The Steve Harvey Show	Jody	Episode: "Pool Sharks Git Bit"
1996–1997	The Secret World of Alex Mack	Hannah Mercury	3 episodes
1998	Profiler	Kristen	Episode: "Cravings"
2004	Entourage	Joanne	Episode: "Date Night"

== Awards and nominations ==
In 2002 she won the Best Actress award at the Valenciennes International Festival of Action and Adventure Films for Love the Hard Way (2001) tied with Kajol for Kabhi Khushi Kabhie Gham (2001).

== See also ==
- List of Puerto Ricans
