= The Insatiable =

2007 film directed by Chuck Konzelman

- Directed by: Chuck Konzelman; Cary Solomon
- Written by: Cary Solomon; Chuck Konzelman; J.R. McGarrity
- Produced by: Jerry Bordeaux; Javier Chapa; Tony Cinciripini; Chachi Ramirez
- Cinematography: Mike Washlesky
- Edited by: Ryan Eaton
- Music by: Christopher Tin
- Release dates: March 28, 2007 (Spain); September 18, 2007 (United States)
- Running time: 103 minutes
- Country: United States
- Language: English

The Insatiable is a direct-to-DVD American vampire film released in 2006. The plot follows solitary cubicle worker Harry Balbo (Sean Patrick Flanery) as he attempts to capture the vampire Tatiana (Charlotte Ayanna) with the assistance of vampire hunter Strickland (Michael Biehn).

== Plot ==
Harry Balbo is a downtrodden office worker struggling with his job and introverted social life. One evening, he witnesses a gruesome attack by a vampiress, becoming determined to slay her. In his research, he finds that vampires are descended from the succubus. In the basement of his apartment condominium, he manufactures a cell and manages to capture the vampiress, named Tatiana. Instead of annihilating her, he allows her to live; slowly connecting with her, never knowing for sure if she really cares about him. Eventually, he considers if he should permit her feeding upon him.

To keep her healthy and "alive," he feeds her rabbits which he purchases from pet stores, though she still stresses the importance of living human blood. Harry's emotional dependency towards Tatiana grows daily and she seems to warm up to him as well. He tries to feed her human blood which he purchased online, but she angrily rejects it. Eventually, he encounters Strickland, a wheelchair-using army veteran whose battalion was slain by vampires and has spent the years since as a recluse tracking vampires worldwide and working out of his apartment and on the Internet through surveillance.

The film ends with a despondent Harry, on the brink of insanity, willingly offering himself to Tatiana. Having grown attached to him, she is reluctant, though her bloodlust eventually takes over and she feeds. She turns Harry into a vampire and they begin to feed together.

== Cast ==
- Sean Patrick Flanery as Harry Balbo
- Charlotte Ayanna as Tatiana
- Michael Biehn as Strickland
- Amanda Noret as Cindi
