= Zoe (Lost) =

Lost character

- Lost character
- Sheila Kelley as Zoe in the sixth season episode "The Last Recruit"
- First appearance: "Recon" (2010)
- Last appearance: "What They Died For" (2010)
- Portrayed by: Sheila Kelley

In-universe information
- Species: Human
- Gender: Female
- Occupation: Geophysicist
- Affiliation: Charles Widmore's team

Zoe is a fictional character portrayed by Sheila Kelley on the ABC television series Lost. Introduced during the sixth and final season, she is a geophysicist working for Charles Widmore (Alan Dale) as part of his team on the Island. Zoe initially presents herself as a survivor of Ajira Airways Flight 316 but is later revealed to be working for Widmore. She appears in five episodes of the series.

Zoe is introduced in the episode "Recon", where she encounters James "Sawyer" Ford (Josh Holloway) on Hydra Island. She later leads an attack on the Man in Black's camp and captures Jin-Soo Kwon (Daniel Dae Kim) to question him about the Island's electromagnetic properties. The Man in Black kills her in "What They Died For" after finding her hiding with Widmore at the Barracks.

== Role in Lost ==
Zoe is a geophysicist who works for Charles Widmore and is part of his team investigating the Island. She is first encountered by Sawyer on Hydra Island, near the bodies of passengers from Ajira Airways Flight 316. Zoe claims that she was the last passenger to survive the crash and had been out gathering wood when the rest of the passengers were killed. Though Sawyer offers to take her to the main Island, he gets suspicious soon after she asks him questions about his group and whether they have weapons. When he draws his weapon, Zoe signals several armed members of Widmore's team who have been hiding nearby. They take Sawyer to Widmore's submarine.

Zoe and her team later attack the Man in Black's camp while he is away and capture Jin. After Jin wakes up in Room 23, Zoe questions him about the Island's electromagnetic pockets and shows him a map created by the Dharma Initiative with his name written on it. Jin refuses to answer her questions and asks to speak with Widmore instead. On the other hand, Zoe gives her take on the fact that she is not a mercenary but a geophysicist when Widmore expresses his displeasure on her decision to attack them earlier than planned. She is later seen with the sedated Desmond Hume (Henry Ian Cusick), whom Widmore's team has brought to the Island.

When Widmore orders Zoe to take Jin to the generator room for an experiment, she points out that the test is scheduled for the following day and that the generator is not ready. Widmore insists that she proceed. Eventually, during the experiment, the generator fails, resulting in the death of one of Widmore's team members. After the event, Sayid Jarrah (Naveen Andrews) takes on Widmore's team members and helps Zoe escape.

The following day, Zoe visits the Man in Black's camp and tells him that Widmore wants Desmond. She commands the launch of a missile strike near the camp and warns that the next attack will not miss. She later returns to Hydra Island, where Sawyer and his group arrive after leaving the main Island. Zoe orders them to surrender their weapons and contacts Widmore by radio. When Sawyer reminds Zoe of his agreement with Widmore, she tells him that the agreement is over and orders her team to prepare for another attack on the Man in Black's camp.

Zoe later accompanies Widmore to the Barracks, where he orders her to retrieve supplies from the dock and sink an outrigger. When the Man in Black arrives, Zoe warns Widmore, who tells her to return. The two hide in a secret room behind a bookcase in Benjamin Linus's (Michael Emerson) house. Ben reveals their location to the Man in Black, who enters the room and asks Zoe who she is. When she attempts to answer, Widmore tells her not to speak. The Man in Black slashes her throat and kills her.

== Development ==
Zoe was portrayed by American actress Sheila Kelley. In November 2009, Kelley was announced to be joining Lost's sixth and final season as a recurring character. TV Guide initially reported that Kelley would play a character named Kendall, although the role's details were not disclosed at the time. The character was identified as Zoe in a March 2010 interview with Kelley.

Kelley described Zoe as a geophysicist who works for Widmore and has her own goal on the Island. In an interview with TV Guide, she claimed that Zoe has a strong interest in the combining of physics and geology with unusual events, including time travel and the Island's energy. Kelley also described Zoe as a character whose actions could make viewers uncertain about whether she was good or evil. In an interview with Us Weekly, Kelley referred to Zoe as Widmore's "right hand", asserting that she was executing his plans but still had her own strategy. In addition, Kelley pointed out that Zoe was searching for someone on the island and made connections with the show’s themes of good and evil and science and faith.

Kelley said that Zoe had worked with Widmore for a couple of years before arriving on the Island. She explained that the character had spent several months preparing for the mission by studying the Island's geography, information from the Dharma Initiative, and dossiers about the people involved. Kelley also described Zoe as confident in her abilities and said that she believed Widmore was doing the right thing.

In another interview with Digital Spy, Kelley discussed Zoe's connection to the show's themes of good and evil, science and faith. She said that Zoe believed her actions were justified and described the character as a strategist who had carefully prepared for her mission on the Island. Kelley also discussed the approach of executive producers Damon Lindelof and Carlton Cuse to working with actors, which she compared to being "dropped into somebody's life". She explained that she created her own backstory for Zoe so that she can fill in the gaps that are not covered in the script. Kelley also said that she searched for the meaning of her character name after accepting the role and learned that it means "life" in the language of the ancient Greeks.

== Reception ==
Zoe received negative reviews from some television commentators during the show's final season. In a roundtable discussion about "The Package" for Reactor, Bridget McGovern said she was not impressed by Kelley as Zoe, referring to her as a "geophysicist-not-a-mercenary". McGovern also criticized Zoe's portrayal in "The Last Recruit", saying Kelley delivered her lines as though she had sustained a head injury. She suggested that Zoe be written out of the series. In a roundtable review of "What They Died For", McGovern questioned Zoe's purpose in the series, describing the character as essentially pointless. In 2024, Jacob Stolworthy of the Independent also described Zoe as "pointless" in his ranking of Lost episodes, criticizing her scenes in "The Package".
