= The Martin Short Show =

Syndicated daytime talk television series

- Presented by: Martin Short
- Country of origin: United States
- No. of seasons: 1

Production
- Production locations: King World Productions; New York City, New York
- Running time: 60 minutes
- Production companies: Dolshor Productions; King World

Original release
- Release: September 13, 1999 – April 14, 2000

The Martin Short Show is a syndicated talk show, based on the late night model, hosted by Martin Short with announcer/sidekick Michael McGrath. The talk show aired for one season from 1999 to 2000. It was produced by King World Productions. John Blanchard, who had previously worked with Martin Short on SCTV, directed the show.

One of the characters from the show, overweight celebrity interviewer Jiminy Glick, went on to be used several times outside the show, including the spin-off series Primetime Glick.

The show performed poorly in the ratings.
