= Sheila Kelley (American actress) =

American actress (born 1963)

- Born: October 9, 1963 (age 63); Greensburg, Pennsylvania, U.S.
- Education: Hempfield Area High School
- Alma mater: Tisch School of the Arts
- Occupation: Actress
- Years active: 1987–present
- Spouse: Richard Schiff (m. 1996)
- Children: 2

Sheila Kelley (born October 9, 1963) is an American actress. She is known for her roles as Gwen Taylor on L.A. Law, Dr. Charlotte "Charley" Bennett Hayes on Sisters, Debbie Wexler on The Good Doctor, and Zoe on Lost.

== Early life ==
Kelley was raised in Greensburg, Pennsylvania, the youngest child in a household of six girls and three boys. The two eldest were children of Leonard and Kate Thom; following Thom's 1950 death in a train accident, Kate married mining engineer and inventor Jay Kelley, with whom she had seven children including Sheila.

Kelley studied ballet, anatomy and movement physiology at New York University's Tisch School of the Arts. One day during the months immediately following her freshman year, Kelley began suffering from the effects of congenital hip dysplasia, which ended her hopes of a dance career. Kelley switched to taking acting classes, and graduated from New York University with a Bachelor of Fine Arts degree. After working in public relations, she acquired a talent agent, began performing in plays, and with friends formed an Off-Off-Broadway theater troupe, The Elephant Company.

== Career ==
Kelley began her acting career in the 1980s in television, with her first credited TV role in 1987. Her first film was Some Girls in 1988. She played the character Gwen Taylor in the legal drama L.A. Law from 1990 to 1993. Most of her work has been in guest roles on American TV series, although she notably played a stripper and performed a seductive dance routine onscreen in the 2000 feature film Dancing at the Blue Iguana.

Kelley was cast in a recurring role in the final season of Lost in 2010, playing Zoe. From 2011 to 2012, she played Carol Rhodes on Gossip Girl.

== Personal life ==
Kelley and actor Richard Schiff married in 1996. Kelley was cast to play his love interest, and later his wife, on The Good Doctor. They have a son born in 1994, and a daughter born in August 2000.

Following her role as a stripper in the film Dancing at the Blue Iguana (2000), Kelley became a fan of pole dancing, and built a national chain of exercise studios around her "S Factor" exercise method, including her book, S Factor: Strip Workouts for Every Woman, DVDs, and inspirational monthly editorials at the "S Factor" website. Her fitness program incorporates Pilates, yoga, stretching and pole dance routines.

== Filmography ==
Film
Year	Title	Role	Notes
1988	Some Girls	Irenka	
1989	Breaking In	Carrie aka Fontaine	
1989	Staying Together	Beth Harper	
1989	Mortal Passions	Adele	
1989	Private Debts	Jessie Burdette	Short film
1990	Where the Heart Is	Sheryl	
1991	Soapdish	Fran	
1991	Pure Luck	Valerie Highsmith	
1991	Wild Blade	Ginger	
1992	Passion Fish	Kim	
1992	Singles	Debbie Hunt	
1993	So I Married an Axe Murderer	Sherry (photos of ex-girlfriend)	Uncredited
1993	Mona Must Die	Rachel McSternberg	
1994	A Passion to Kill	Beth	
1996	One Fine Day	Kristen	
1997	Santa Fe	Leah Thomas	
2000	Nurse Betty	Joyce	
2000	Dancing at the Blue Iguana	Stormy	Also producer
2003	Matchstick Men	Kathy	
2005	Mozart and the Whale	Janice	
2010	Bloodworth	Louise Halfacre	
2013	Last Weekend	Vivian	
2014	The Guest	Laura Peterson	

Television
Year	Title	Role	Notes
1987	Tonight's the Night	Tanya	Television film
1987	The Betty Ford Story	Charlotte	Television film
1988	Terrorist on Trial: The United States vs. Salim Ajami	Trish	Television film
1989	The Fulfillment of Mary Gray	Kate	Television film
1989	thirtysomething	Cheryl Eastman	Episode: "First Day/Last Day"
1990–1993	L.A. Law	Gwen Taylor	Recurring (seasons 4–5); main cast (seasons 6–7); 42 episodes
1991	The Chase	Roxanne	Television film
1993	Full Stretch	Pam Pearson	Episode: "Ivory Tower"
1993	The Hidden Room	Susan	Episode: "Best Intentions"
1994	Deconstructing Sarah	Sarah Vincent/Ruth	Television film
1995	Wings	Sarah	Recurring 2 episodes
1995	The Secretary	Deidre Bosnell	Television film
1995–1996	Sisters	Dr. Charlotte "Charley" Bennett	Main cast (season 6); 23 episodes
1998	Touched by an Angel	Carrie Nichols Carver	Episode: "What Are Friends For?"
1998–1999	ER	Coco Robbins	Recurring 3 episodes
1999	Mind Prey	Andi Manette	Television film
2001	Family Law	Jennifer Palmer	Episode: "Intentions"
2001	The Jennie Project	Leah Archibald	Television film
2002	MDs	Pam Kellerman	Recurring 4 episodes
2003	The Division	Tess Stanton	Episode: "Strangers"
2006	The Sopranos	Allison Crider	Episode: "Join the Club"
2010	Lost	Zoe	Recurring 5 episodes
2010	Hawaii Five-0	Nancy Harris	Episode: "Palekaiko"
2011–2012	Gossip Girl	Carol Rhodes	Recurring 8 episodes
2012	NCIS	Victoria Dearing	Episode: "Till Death Do Us Part"
2013	Real Housewives of Beverly Hills:	Pole instructor	Season 3, Episode 11
2018–2021	The Good Doctor	Debbie Wexler	Recurring 13 episodes
2021	Turner & Hooch	Emily Turner	Recurring 2 episodes
