= Irving Cohen =

Fictional character

Irving Cohen was a character played by Martin Short on SCTV, and brought with him to SNL.

Cohen was a caricature of old Tin Pan Alley songsmiths from the early 1900s , with a particular admiration for Al Jolson. The running gag in any sketch where Cohen appeared was that he would claim that he could "write a song about anyt'ing," at which point Irving would call to a pianist off camera, "Give me a 'C', a bouncy 'C'", and then he would ad-lib lyrics, ending with, "Da-da-da-da-dee, da-da-da-da-dah, ah, whatever da hell else ya wanna put in da t'ing!" This off camera pianist seemed to follow Cohen everywhere, even bursting into song in the middle of a HUAC hearing. Cohen started his interviews by reminiscing about the old days, starting off with, "In the old days, we had a t'ing, called, 'Vau-de-ville'..." He also frequently name-dropped Al Jolson and Sophie Tucker and had a habit of punctuating sentences with the phrase "at this time."

Cohen is loosely based on Irving Caesar, the author of numerous song standards, including "Swanee" and "Tea for Two”, who lived to the age of 101.

== History ==
Short played Cohen in the closing scene of Muppets Tonight episode 110, sitting in the nursing home with Statler and Waldorf.

Cohen's age could only be guessed at, but he appeared to be in his nineties, and Short wore heavy age makeup to portray the character. A recurring gag is that several sketches featuring Cohen are tributes to him on his 90th birthday, regardless of how many tributes there actually were.

On SCTV, he was featured on The William B. Williams Show, a spinoff of The Sammy Maudlin Show, which was SCTV's running parody of The Tonight Show. He also was featured as a spokesman in several commercial parodies.

On SNL, he was included in a sketch featuring other old Yiddish Vaudevillian characters portrayed by other cast members including Billy Crystal, Rich Hall and Christopher Guest, and guest host Eddie Murphy playing his Gumby character, whom he played as an old Yiddish vaudeville actor. The sketch took place in a deli off Broadway, and featured a joke in which everyone tried to remember the ingredients of a Morey Amsterdam sandwich. Cohen used his trademark "Give me a 'C', a bouncy, 'C' " and listed ingredients, followed by, "Da-da-da-da-dee, da-da-da-da-dah, ah, whatever da hell else ya wanna put in da sammich". The sketch ended when a waiter refused to serve Gumby, who had done a dine-and-dash years before.

Cohen featured heavily as a character in a single episode of Primetime Glick. He is said to be the executive producer of Jiminy's show, although this is not mentioned in any other episode. Appearing even more advanced in age than usual, Cohen suffers a heart attack while cavorting with several women in his boudoir. Jiminy announces Cohen's hospitalization on his show, and later, after assuming Cohen has died, begins to display a video tribute. The tribute is interrupted when Cohen calls the studio from a hospital room made just like his boudoir, and informs Jiminy that he is okay. However, in the middle of singing his trademark song, he suffers a second heart attack while still on the phone.

The character also appeared in Short's 2012 comedy special I, Martin Short, Goes Home and "The Irving Who Came to Dinner," the final episode of The Completely Mental Misadventures of Ed Grimley.
