= Right On (TV program) =

- Genre: Variety
- Directed by: Barry Cranston
- Country of origin: Canada
- Original language: English
- No. of seasons: 1

Production
- Producer: Barry Cranston
- Running time: 30 minutes

Original release
- Network: CBC Television
- Release: 13 December 1972 – 28 March 1973

Right On is a Canadian variety show that aired on CBC Television from 1972 to 1973.

== Premise ==
This live broadcast featured performances by Canadian guest artists such as Martin Short. Gary Gross led the program's house band which included percussionist Paul Zaza.

== Scheduling ==
This half-hour program was broadcast on Wednesdays at 5:00 p.m. (Eastern time) from 13 December 1972 to 28 March 1973.
