= Marty, Life Is Short =

2026 documentary film

- Film poster
- Directed by: Lawrence Kasdan
- Produced by: Sara Bernstein; Blair Foster; Lawrence Kasdan; Meredith Kaulfers; Christopher St. John; Justin Wilkes
- Starring: Martin Short
- Cinematography: Bryant Fisher; Antonio Rossi; Emily Topper
- Edited by: Sierra Neal
- Music by: James Newton Howard; Xander Rodzinski
- Distributed by: Netflix
- Release date: May 12, 2026
- Running time: 101 minutes
- Country: United States
- Language: English

Marty, Life Is Short is a 2026 American documentary film, directed by Lawrence Kasdan, about the Canadian actor and comedian Martin Short. It premiered on Netflix on May 12, 2026.

== Synopsis ==
The documentary explores Short's life and five-decade career through archival footage, personal home movies, and interviews with friends and fellow entertainers.

== Release ==
The film was released worldwide on Netflix on May 12, 2026.

== Reception ==
On the review aggregator website Rotten Tomatoes, 97% of 37 critics' reviews are positive, with an average rating of 7.7/10. The website's consensus reads: "Equal parts sweet and poignant, Life is Short does justice to Martin Short's life and career by acknowledging how pain and tragedy make joy all the more precious." Metacritic, which uses a weighted average, assigned the film a score of 68 out of 100, based on eight critics, indicating "generally favorable" reviews.

Monica Castillo of The A.V. Club gave the film a B, writing that the film "is an overdue appreciation of a performer who's underestimated as a clown only because he makes being funny look so easy." Brian Tallerico of RogerEbert.com gave the film three out of four stars and wrote, "Ultimately, watching Marty, Life is Short as a huge fan of its subject makes for an entertaining if not illuminating experience."
