= Alycia Bellamy =

American singer, actress and muse

- Also known as: Alycia Bella
- Born: Aliceia Lavae Bellamy; August 10, 1989 (age 37)
- Origin: California
- Genres: Alternative R&B
- Occupations: Singer-songwriter, actress
- Instruments: Vocals, keyboards
- Years active: 2009–present
- Labels: Indie Pop Records, Unsigned
- Website: www.alyciabella.com

Alycia Bellamy (born Aliceia Lavae Bellamy, August 10, 1989) is an American singer, actress and muse. She is first known as the friend of Angela and Vanessa Simmons, appearing as a series regular on the first season of MTV's Daddy's Girls. As a singer, Alycia has worked with Justin Timberlake, NE-YO, Frank Ocean, Dream, Ty Dolla $ign, and will.i.am of The Black Eyed Peas.

== Early life ==
Alycia was born in San Jose, California and now resides in Los Angeles. Her father is from Biloxi, Mississippi.

== Career ==
Alycia Bellamy began her career as an up-and-coming singer on the MTV show Daddy's Girls alongside Angela and Vanessa Simmons. Alycia has become well known for her songs like Greedy and Is It A Crime. In 2011, she released a mixtape Girl Interrupted. Alycia is currently cast on the premiere of E Television, "The Platinum Life" debuting October 15, 2017 at 10 pm EST.

== Personal ==
She can be seen in Frank Ocean's music video for Novacane and heard talking on the song 'End' off of his debut album channel ORANGE. She starred in Machine Gun Kelly's video, "The Break Up", in 2018.
