= Jiminy Glick in Lalawood =

- Theatrical release poster
- Directed by: Vadim Jean
- Written by: Martin Short; Michael Short; Paul Flaherty
- Produced by: Bernie Brillstein; Paul Brooks; Peter Safran; Martin Short
- Starring: Martin Short; Jan Hooks; Linda Cardellini; Janeane Garofalo; John Michael Higgins
- Cinematography: Mike Fox
- Edited by: Matt Davis
- Music by: David Lawrence
- Production companies: Gold Circle Films; Brillstein-Grey Entertainment; Dolshor Productions; La La Wood Productions
- Distributed by: Metro-Goldwyn-Mayer Pictures (United States; through MGM Distribution Co.); 20th Century Fox (International)
- Release date: September 18, 2004 (Toronto International Film Festival)
- Running time: 90 minutes
- Country: United States
- Language: English
- Box office: $36,039

Jiminy Glick in Lalawood is a 2004 American comedy film starring Martin Short as Jiminy Glick, a morbidly obese movie critic who is involved in a murder case at the Toronto International Film Festival. The supporting cast features Jan Hooks, Matthew Gray Gubler, Linda Cardellini, Janeane Garofalo, John Michael Higgins, Elizabeth Perkins, Mo Collins, and Aries Spears, with numerous cinema luminaries playing themselves, such as Willem Dafoe, Whoopi Goldberg, Jake Gyllenhaal, Kevin Kline, Rob Lowe, Steve Martin, Kurt Russell, Susan Sarandon, Chloë Sevigny, Sharon Stone, Kiefer Sutherland and Forest Whitaker.

== Plot ==
The film starts off as an Entertainment Tonight or Access Hollywood spoof, but develops into a murder mystery, with David Lynch played by Martin Short as a makeshift Hercule Poirot.

Jiminy Glick (also played by Short) checks into a spooky hotel where Lynch is at the bar, spouting random scenes for his new movie. Glick hits the spotlight when he gets to interview Ben DiCarlo (Corey Pearson), who is starring in an indie flick called Growing Up Gandhi. This movie is a tale of Gandhi's rise as a prize fighter in the boxing rings of India. The film and its star are not well received, except for Glick who slept through the screening.

After this scoop, Glick gets another prize interview with Miranda Coolidge (Elizabeth Perkins), who becomes the key figure in the murder mystery. Coolidge is starring in a lesbian sexploitation movie called African Queens (a takeoff of The African Queen) but is soon involved in the aforementioned murder.

Glick conducts interviews with real stars like Steve Martin, Kurt Russell, and red carpet interviews with Kiefer Sutherland, Whoopi Goldberg, Sharon Stone, and Jake Gyllenhaal. Jiminy gets kidnapped by Randall Bookerton (Gary Anthony Williams), a local hip hop recording artist, who wants his animated film, The Littlest Roach, to win Best Picture. Jiminy also becomes a suspect in Miranda Coolidge's "murder". He and Dixie (Jan Hooks) retrieve his cell phone, which mysteriously appears in Miranda's room.

Jiminy thinks that Andre (John Michael Higgins) is covering up her murder. David Lynch appears and tells the Glicks what happened. It is revealed that Natalie (Linda Cardellini), Miranda's daughter, killed her girlfriend Dee Dee (Janeane Garofalo) who was having an affair with Andre, her mother's agent. Dee Dee disguises herself as Miranda in case she got drunk and upset. Glick mistakes her for the real Miranda and passes out in her bedroom. Andre calls some "former business associates" to dispose of Dee Dee's body. Natalie stabs Andre in anger over his affair with Dee Dee.

Natalie goes to jail for 20 years. The future of the film festival is uncertain, and Miranda is considering retirement. Randall Bookerton and his posse are happy to receive an award for their film. Glick, meanwhile, realizes that celebrities can be dull, after interviewing actor Rob Lowe, ending the film. During the credits, bloopers and outtakes are seen with Jiminy interviewing Kurt Russell and Steve Martin.

== Cast ==
- Martin Short as Jiminy Glick / David Lynch
- Jan Hooks as Dixie Glick
- Linda Cardellini as Natalie Coolidge
- Janeane Garofalo as Dee Dee
- John Michael Higgins as Andre Devine
- Elizabeth Perkins as Miranda Coolidge
- Larry Joe Campbell as Haygood Lewkin
- Mo Collins as Sharon
- Carlos Jacott as Barry King
- Aries Spears as Gunnar "MC GUN" Jorge
- Robert Trebor as Jay Schiffer
- Gary Anthony Williams as Randall Bookerton
- Alex Diakun as Bellhop/Barber
- Peter Breck as Tibor
- Ellie Harvie as June
- Darren Shahlavi as Johnny Stompanato
- Christine Willes as Arlene Sheehy
- Peter Kelamis as Hotel Clerk

Cameos

- Willem Dafoe
- Whoopi Goldberg
- Jake Gyllenhaal
- Kevin Kline
- Rob Lowe
- Steve Martin
- Kurt Russell
- Susan Sarandon
- Chloë Sevigny
- Sharon Stone
- Kiefer Sutherland
- Forest Whitaker

== Production ==
In September 2002, it was announced Gold Circle Films had signed a deal with Martin Short to produce a feature film based on his character Jiminy Glick titled Lalawood with Vadim Jean set to direct from a script written by Short, his brother Michael and Paul Flaherty that would feature the character at the Toronto Film Festival. Short got the idea for Lalawood while attending the festival and thought the atmosphere of hype frenzy would serve as a solid foil to Glick's bloated ego.

== Reception ==
The film received mostly negative reviews; it has a 23% Fresh rating on Rotten Tomatoes.
