= Steve Martin and Martin Short: An Evening You Will Forget for the Rest of Your Life =

Stand-up comedy show starring Steve Martin and Martin Short

- Directed by: Marcus Raboy
- Written by: Steve Martin; Martin Short
- Produced by: Marcus Raboy; Steve Martin; Martin Short; Lorne Michaels
- Starring: Steve Martin; Martin Short
- Cinematography: Jay Lafayette
- Edited by: Michael Schultz
- Distributed by: Netflix
- Release date: May 25, 2018
- Running time: 74 minutes
- Country: United States

An Evening You Will Forget for the Rest of Your Life is a 2018 American stand-up comedy show written and performed by comedians Steve Martin and Martin Short and directed by Marcus Raboy. The special received four Primetime Emmy Award nominations and a Directors Guild of America Award nomination.

== Premise ==
Comedians and writers Steve Martin and Martin Short perform a live comedy set with music by The Steep Canyon Rangers and jazz pianist, Jeff Babko, at the Peace Center in Greenville, South Carolina.

== Production ==
The special entitled, Steve Martin and Martin Short: An Evening You Will Forget for the Rest of Your Life was taped at the Peace Center in Greenville. It features new comedy bits, musical sketches and conversations about the two old friends’ long careers, most memorable encounters and their lives in showbiz.

About the release, Steve Martin joked on Twitter, "Now we're like Chris Rock and Dave Chappelle except for the pay!"

== Release ==
The special was released on Netflix streaming platform on May 25, 2018.

== Reception ==
On Rotten Tomatoes, the special has an approval rating of 100% based on 10 reviews with the critics consensus reading, "Brimming with sidesplitting laughs and off the wall energy, Steve Martin And Martin Short: An Evening You Will Forget For the Rest of Your Life is a nostalgic celebration of two comedy legends". Rolling Stone critic described the special as "Showbiz comfort food" adding that it "captures two veteran comedians resurrecting vaudeville-era schtick – and it feels so good". NPR described the special as "aggressively affable and very broad, and sometimes that's just what you need."

== Awards and nominations ==
Year	Award	Category	Nominee(s)	Result	Ref.
2018	Primetime Emmy Awards	Outstanding Variety Special (Pre-Recorded)	Erin David, Marc Gurvitz, Neal Marshall, Steve Martin, Lorne Michaels, Marcus Raboy, and Martin Short	Nominated	
2018	Primetime Emmy Awards	Outstanding Directing for a Variety Special	Marcus Raboy	Nominated	
2018	Primetime Emmy Awards	Outstanding Writing for a Variety Special	Steve Martin and Martin Short	Nominated	
2018	Primetime Emmy Awards	Outstanding Original Music and Lyrics	Steve Martin (for "The Buddy Song")	Nominated	
2019	Directors Guild of America Awards	Outstanding Directing for a Variety Special	Marcus Raboy	Nominated	
