= I, Martin Short, Goes Home =

Canadian television comedy special

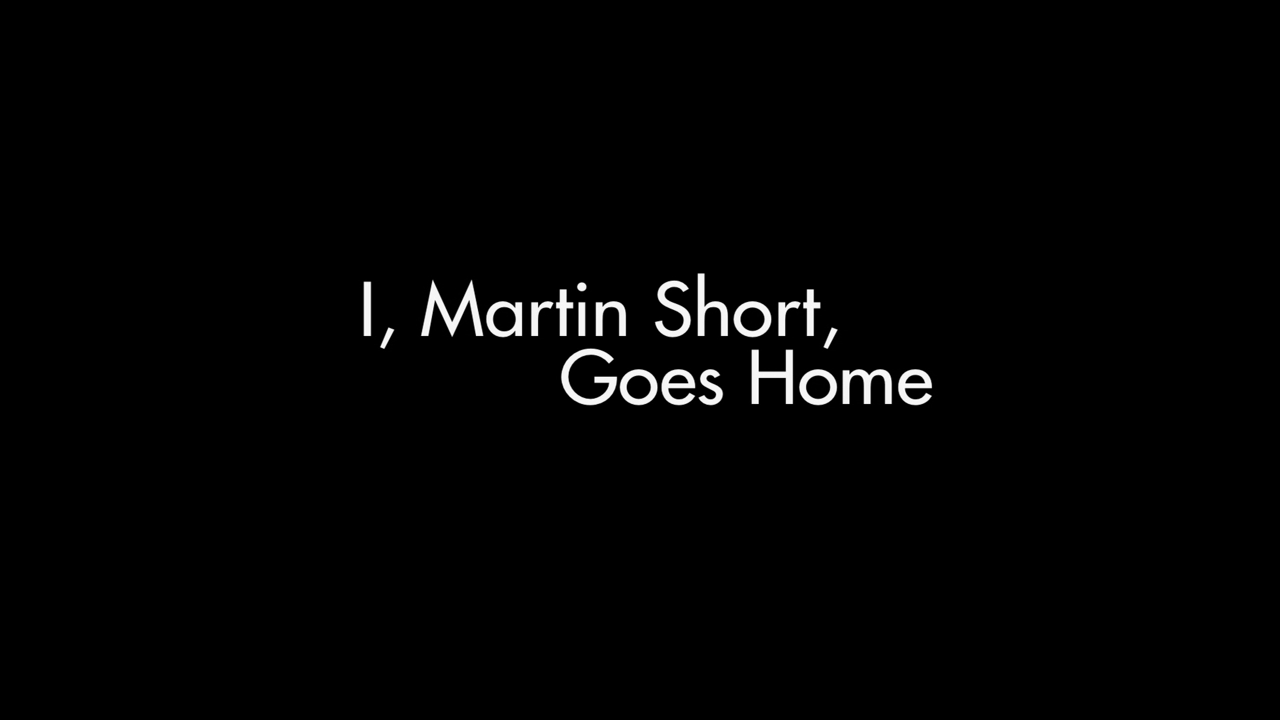
- The title card
- Written by: Martin Short; Michael Short
- Directed by: Ian Ross MacDonald
- Starring: Martin Short
- Music by: Jay McCarrol
- Country of origin: Canada
- Original language: English

Production
- Running time: 45 minutes
- Budget: CA$900,000 (estimated)

Original release
- Network: CBC Television
- Release: April 3, 2012

I, Martin Short, Goes Home is a Canadian television comedy special, written by and starring comedian Martin Short, which aired on CBC Television in 2012. The title is a sequel of sorts to Short's 1989 HBO comedy special, I, Martin Short, Goes Hollywood.

== Plot description ==
The 2012 special blends aspects of both autobiography and fiction, depicting a scripted mockumentary plot in which Short returns to his hometown of Hamilton, Ontario to appear at a benefit show for his childhood hero, puppeteer Mason McGillivray (Fred Willard), and uses the occasion to reminisce about his pre-stardom life in the city. In addition to himself, Short plays a number of other characters, including his SCTV and Saturday Night Live characters Irving Cohen, Bradley Allen and Ed Grimley.

== Production ==
The special's cast also includes Short's former SCTV colleagues Eugene Levy, Joe Flaherty, Andrea Martin and Robin Duke, although Duke and Short never appeared on SCTV at the same time. Also appearing were George Stroumboulopoulos, Naomi Snieckus, Kathryn Greenwood, Ely Henry and Michael Therriault.

The special aired on CBC Television on April 3, 2012, and garnered Short a nomination for Best Lead Actor in a Comedy Program or Series at the 1st Canadian Screen Awards.
