= Maya & Marty =

American live television variety show

- Genre: Variety show
- Presented by: Maya Rudolph; Martin Short
- Country of origin: United States
- Original language: English
- No. of seasons: 1
- No. of episodes: 6

Production
- Executive producer: Lorne Michaels
- Producers: Matt Roberts; Erin David; Dave Becky; Marc Gurvitz; Sandy Wernick; John Lieberman; Maya Rudolph; Martin Short
- Production locations: NBC Studios; New York City
- Running time: 60 minutes
- Production companies: Broadway Video; 3 Arts Entertainment; Brillstein Entertainment Partners; Universal Television

Original release
- Network: NBC
- Release: May 31 – July 12, 2016

Maya & Marty is an American television limited variety show that premiered on NBC on May 31, 2016, broadcasting six episodes in total. The series was co-hosted by comedians Maya Rudolph and Martin Short, and produced by Lorne Michaels, featuring various comedy sketches, musical performances, and celebrity guests. Kenan Thompson was also a regular, as was Mikey Day. Though not listed as a series regular, Steve Martin appeared in three of the show's six episodes; Jimmy Fallon and Sean Hayes each appeared in two episodes.

== Production ==
Rudolph had previously hosted a variety show titled The Maya Rudolph Show, with a standalone pilot aired on May 19, 2014. In its original form it was not initially picked up for series. Beginning in 2015, the concept was revived and went through approximately one year's worth of redevelopment. The variety series was greenlit on February 12, 2016, and was tentatively titled Maya and Marty in Manhattan. The variety series was recorded at Studio 6A in NBC's headquarters at 30 Rockefeller Plaza in New York City. Saturday Night Live is broadcast from the same building, of which both Short and Rudolph are alumni.

The series was the network's second recent attempt at airing a prime time variety show after Best Time Ever with Neil Patrick Harris was cancelled partway through the late 2015 season.

Per producer Lorne Michaels, the show was always intended only as a summer "pop-up" as opposed to a traditional seasonal format. No plans for more episodes were announced.

== Broadcast ==
Maya & Marty premiered on NBC in the United States. The first episode aired at 10:00/9:00 pm ET/PT on Tuesday, May 31, 2016, following the 11th season premiere of America's Got Talent. The final episode aired at 10:00/9:00 pm ET/PT on Tuesday, July 12, 2016.

== Cast ==
Starring

- Maya Rudolph
- Martin Short
- Kenan Thompson

Featuring

- Mikey Day

Guest appearances

Maya & Marty featured guest appearances by:

- Jimmy Fallon
- Larry David
- Tom Hanks
- Steve Martin
- Kate McKinnon
- Savion Glover
- Miley Cyrus
- Drake
- Sean Hayes
- Nathan Lane
- Tina Fey
- John Cena
- Nick Jonas
- Eva Longoria
- Kevin Hart
- Ben Stiller
- Ana Gasteyer
- Ricky Gervais
- Jerry Seinfeld
- Kevin Kline
- Cecily Strong
- Amy Poehler
- Will Forte
- Kelly Ripa
- Emma Stone

== Episodes ==
No.	Title	Original release date	US viewers (millions)
1	"Jimmy Fallon, Larry David, Tom Hanks, Steve Martin, Kate McKinnon, Savion Glover, the cast of Shuffle Along & Miley Cyrus"	May 31, 2016	6.26
2	"Steve Martin, Drake, Sean Hayes, Nathan Lane & Tina Fey"	June 7, 2016	4.65
3	"John Cena, Nick Jonas, Eva Longoria, Kevin Hart, Jimmy Fallon & Ben Stiller"	June 14, 2016	5.11
4	"Ricky Gervais & Cecily Strong"	June 21, 2016	4.15
5	"Amy Poehler, Jerry Seinfeld, Will Forte, Kevin Kline & Ana Gasteyer"	July 5, 2016	4.26
6	"Sean Hayes, Steve Martin, Kelly Ripa & Emma Stone"	July 12, 2016	3.94
