= Primetime Glick =

American television series

- Genre: Comedy
- Created by: Martin Short
- Presented by: Martin Short
- Theme music composer: Jack Coles
- Ending theme: Joy Ride
- Country of origin: United States
- Original language: English
- No. of seasons: 3
- No. of episodes: 30

Production
- Executive producers: Bernie Brillstein; Martin Short
- Producers: Paul Flaherty; Michael Short
- Running time: 22 minutes
- Production company: Comedy Partners

Original release
- Network: Comedy Central
- Release: June 20, 2001 – July 3, 2003

Primetime Glick is an American television program starring Martin Short as Jiminy Glick. The series aired on Comedy Central from June 20, 2001 to July 3, 2003.

== Format ==
The half-hour show is a spoof of late night talk shows such as The Tonight Show, with bandleader Adrian Van Voorhees (Michael McKean), and sometimes exposing fake production staff. Host Jiminy Glick (Martin Short in a fatsuit) has a monologue and banter with Van Voorhees, and then centers the show on a series of interviews where "guest celebrities try to hold up their end of the hilariously incoherent conversation". Interspersed between those are advertisements for absurd products and shows.

== Reception ==
Terry Kelleher of People.com liked the show overall, but said the mock advertisements "tend to be funnier in concept (Short as Tom Green delivering a pizza to terrorist Osama bin Laden) than in execution" and would prefer more interaction with Van Voorhees. Michael Abernethy of Popmatters approved, saying that, compared to Short's previous manic characters, Glick's character format allows for more focus on the dynamic dialogue exchanges between host and guests, who are having genuine fun like a "giggle fit". He complained that the short half hour format limits some "clever concepts that could become models of comic timing if allowed to ease to a climax".

== Series overview ==
| Season | Episodes | Originally released | |
| Season | Episodes | First released | Last released |
|---|---|---|---|
| 1 | 10 | June 20, 2001 | August 22, 2001 |
| 2 | 10 | February 22, 2002 | April 27, 2002 |
| 3 | 10 | April 30, 2003 | July 3, 2003 |

== Episodes ==
=== Season 1 (2001) ===
| No. overall | No. in season | Title | Original release date |
|---|---|---|---|
| 1 | 1 | "Bill Maher / Steve Martin" | June 20, 2001 |
| 2 | 2 | "Dennis Miller / Jerry Seinfeld" | June 27, 2001 |
| 3 | 3 | "Rob Lowe / Billy Crystal" | July 4, 2001 |
| 4 | 4 | "Janeane Garofalo / John Salley" | July 11, 2001 |
| 5 | 5 | "Molly Shannon / Nathan Lane" | July 18, 2001 |
| 6 | 6 | "Paul Shaffer / Damon Wayans" | July 25, 2001 |
| 7 | 7 | "Eugene Levy / Conan O'Brien" | August 1, 2001 |
| 8 | 8 | "Regis Philbin / Russell Crowe" | August 15, 2001 |
| 9 | 9 | "Kathie Lee Gifford / Dick Cheney" | August 15, 2001 |
| 10 | 10 | "George Wendt / Chevy Chase / Evelyn Celic" | August 22, 2001 |

=== Season 2 (2002) ===
| No. overall | No. in season | Title | Original release date |
|---|---|---|---|
| 11 | 1 | "Tom Hanks / Ben Stiller" | February 23, 2002 |
| 12 | 2 | "Rebecca Romijn-Stamos / David Duchovny" | March 2, 2002 |
| 13 | 3 | "Jeff Goldblum / Julia Louis-Dreyfus" | March 9, 2002 |
| 14 | 4 | "Jay Mohr / Rosie O'Donnell" | March 16, 2002 |
| 15 | 5 | "Jim Belushi / Rick Fox" | March 23, 2002 |
| 16 | 6 | "Andy Richter / Alec Baldwin" | March 30, 2002 |
| 17 | 7 | "Tim Allen / Edie Falco" | April 6, 2002 |
| 18 | 8 | "Jon Lovitz / Rob Reiner" | April 13, 2002 |
| 19 | 9 | "Catherine O'Hara / Ray Romano" | April 20, 2002 |
| 20 | 10 | "Cheri Oteri / Dennis Miller" | April 27, 2002 |

=== Season 3 (2003) ===
| No. overall | No. in season | Title | Original release date |
|---|---|---|---|
| 21 | 1 | "Brendan Fraser / Ice Cube" | April 30, 2003 |
| 22 | 2 | "Eric McCormack / Jack Black" | May 7, 2003 |
| 23 | 3 | "Ellen DeGeneres / Steven Spielberg" | May 14, 2003 |
| 24 | 4 | "Jimmy Kimmel / Sharon Stone" | May 22, 2003 |
| 25 | 5 | "Mel Brooks / Jason Alexander" | May 29, 2003 |
| 26 | 6 | "Brad Garrett / Jon Stewart" | June 5, 2003 |
| 27 | 7 | "Megan Mullally / Elijah Wood" | June 12, 2003 |
| 28 | 8 | "Chris Elliott" | June 19, 2003 |
| 29 | 9 | "Tim Robbins / Rob Schneider" | June 26, 2003 |
| 30 | 10 | "Lorraine Bracco / John McEnroe" | July 3, 2003 |

== Awards and nominations ==
| Year | Association | Category | Project | Results | Ref. |
|---|---|---|---|---|---|
| 2003 | Primetime Emmy Awards | Outstanding Individual Performance in a Variety Program | Martin Short | Nominated | |
| 2003 | Primetime Emmy Awards | Outstanding Prosthetic Makeup | Kevin Haney, Kristina Vogel | Won | |
