= List of Bob and Doug McKenzie appearances on SCTV =

The following is a list of Great White North segments from 1980-1982. The characters of Bob and Doug McKenzie first appeared in the first episode of SCTV's third season.

== Series overview ==
Season	Episodes	Originally aired	DVD release dates
Season	Episodes	Originally aired	Region 1
3	25	1980–1981	October 24, 2006, Various
4/1	2	1981	June 8, 2004
4/2	9	1981–1982	October 19, 2004
4/3	5	1982	March 1, 2005

== Season 3 (1980-1981) ==
The Great White North segments featured one two-minute sketch per episode. Production took place after hours at SCTV, where several segments would be filmed at once. Of the segments produced, twenty-five were aired during the third season.

No. overall	No. in season	Skit name	SCTV Episode	DVD Release	Original release date
1	1	"Introductory Show"	"Lee Iacocca's Rock Concert"	N/A	September 19, 1980
2	2	"Doug's Got His Earmuffs On"	"Thursday Night Live"	SCTV: Best of the Early Years	September 26, 1980
3	3	"The French Problem"	"Death of a Salesman"	N/A	October 3, 1980
4	4	"Calculators"	"My Factory, My Self"	SCTV: Best of the Early Years, SCTV: Volume 1	October 10, 1980
5	5	"Snow Chains"	"Death Motel"	SCTV: Best of the Early Years, Bob & Doug McKenzie's Two-Four Anniversary DVD	October 17, 1980
6	6	"Back Bacon and Snow Chains"	"The Lone Ranger Show"	SCTV: Volume 1	October 24, 1980
7	7	"Making Doug Go"	"Play It Again, Bob"	SCTV: Best of the Early Years, SCTV: Volume 1	October 31, 1980
8	8	"Back Packing with Beer on Ski Trips"	"Gaslight"	SCTV: Best of the Early Years	November 7, 1980
9	9	"Snowshoes for Spatulas"	"Man's Ability to Imitate"	N/A	November 14, 1980
10	10	"Boom Shadows, Stuff that Bugs Us"	"Mel's Rock Pile"	N/A	November 21, 1980
11	11	"Miracle of Back Bacon"	"The Sammy Maudlin Show"	SCTV: Best of the Early Years	November 28, 1980
12	12	"Name that Smoke"	"Night Gallery"	N/A	December 5, 1980
13	13	"Star Wars"	"Star Wars"	N/A	December 12, 1980
14	14	"Exercise"	"Hollywood Salutes the Extras"	SCTV: Best of the Early Years, Bob & Doug McKenzie's Two-Four Anniversary DVD	December 19, 1980
15	15	"Rolling Your Own With Ski Mitts"	"The Irwin Allen Show"	SCTV: Best of the Early Years, Bob & Doug McKenzie's Two-Four Anniversary DVD	December 26, 1980
16	16	"Mystery Guest"	"Big Brother"	SCTV: Best of the Early Years, Bob & Doug McKenzie's Two-Four Anniversary DVD	January 2, 1981
17	17	"The Best Groups and Doug's Imitations"	"Two Way TV / Pit Bulls"	SCTV: Best of the Early Years, SCTV: Volume 1, Bob & Doug McKenzie's Two-Four Anniversary DVD	January 9, 1981
18	18	"Sports"	"Alpha Channel"	N/A	January 16, 1981
19	19	"Bowling Loaded"	"Midnight Express Special"	SCTV: Best of the Early Years, Bob & Doug McKenzie's Two-Four Anniversary DVD	January 23, 1981
20	20	"Stuff That Bugs Us"	"Cookery Crock / Cartoon Coroner"	SCTV: Volume 1	January 30, 1981
21	21	"Parking at Donut Places"	"The Mating Game"	SCTV: Volume 1	February 6, 1981
22	22	"Kicked Out of Studio"	"Gene Shalit's America"	N/A	February 13, 1981
23	23	"Stolen Car"	"Mel's Rock Pile - MacArthur Park"	N/A	February 20, 1981
24	24	"Where to Look for Cops"	"Dick Cavett"	SCTV: Best of the Early Years, Bob & Doug McKenzie's Two-Four Anniversary DVD	February 27, 1981
25	25	"Doug Builds a Studio"	"The Cisco Kid"	N/A	March 6, 1981

== Season 4, Cycle 1 (1981) ==
Most of this cycle was made up of Great White North repeat segments. The only new appearances were in episodes 4/1-2 and 4/1-9. The final episode of the season included a wraparound storyline which heavily featured the characters.

No. overall	No. in season	Skit name	SCTV Episode	DVD Release	Original release date
26	2	"Traveling and Salaries"	"Polynesiantown with Dr. John"	SCTV: Volume 1	May 22, 1981
27	9	"Great White North: Ian Thomas"	"The Great White North with Ian Thomas"	SCTV: Volume 1	July 31, 1981

== Season 4, Cycle 2 (1981-1982) ==
Growing in popularity, the characters returned for 9 new segments in the second cycle of season 4. While Cycle 1 featured many repeats, this is the only cycle to feature a new Great White North segment in each episode.

No. overall	No. in season	Skit name	SCTV Episode	DVD Release	Original release date
28	1	"Economics"	"CCCP 1 with Al Jarreau"	SCTV: Volume 2	October 16, 1981
29	2	"Mouse in a Bottle"	"I'm Taking My Own Head, Screwing It On Right, and no Guy's Gonna Tell Me It Ain't with The Plasmatics"	SCTV: Volume 2, Strange Brew DVD	October 23, 1981
30	3	"Short Cuts"	"Zontar with Bonar Bain and Natalie Cole"	SCTV: Volume 2	October 30, 1981
31	4	"Carpets"	"Walter Cronkite's Brain with Rough Trade"	SCTV: Volume 2	November 6, 1981
32	5	"Microwave Ovens"	"Doorway to Hell with Eugene Fodor"	SCTV: Volume 2	November 20, 1981
33	6	"Long Underwear and Back Bacon"	"The Godfather with James Ingram and John Marley"	SCTV: Volume 2	December 11, 1981
34	7	"Beer Nog"	"SCTV Staff Christmas Party"	SCTV: Volume 2, Christmas with SCTV	December 18, 1981
35	8	"The Great White North"	"Teacher's Pet with The Boomtown Rats"	SCTV: Volume 2	February 12, 1982
36	9	"The Space Arm/Snow Routes"	"Midnight Video Special with Talking Heads and Plastics"	SCTV: Volume 2	February 19, 1982

== Season 4, Cycle 3 (1982) ==
This was the last season to feature the characters. The first episode's plot revolves around the growing popularity of Bob and Doug and they are given their own variety show on SCTV, which turns into a catastrophe. The characters are then featured in four final segments before Rick Moranis and Dave Thomas left SCTV to film Strange Brew.

No. overall	No. in season	Skit name	SCTV Episode	DVD Release	Original release date
37	1	"The Great White North Palace"	"The Great White North Palace with Tony Bennett"	SCTV: Volume 3	April 16, 1982
38	3	"15-Pin Bowling"	"The People's Global Golden Choice Awards with Third World"	SCTV: Volume 3	May 1, 1982
39	5	"How to Beat the Russians"	"Pet Peeves / The Happy Wanderers with Carl Perkins"	SCTV: Volume 3	May 21, 1982
40	6	"Twist-off Beer Caps"	"Chariots of Eggs with Hall and Oates"	SCTV: Volume 3	June 5, 1982
41	8	"Dog Scoopers"	"Rome, Italian Style with Jimmy Buffett"	SCTV: Volume 3	October 15, 1982

== See also ==
- Strange Brew
- Bob & Doug McKenzie's Two-Four Anniversary
- Bob & Doug (2009 TV series)
- SCTV
- Brother Bear
- Canadian English
- Beer in Canada
- Hoser
- The Red Green Show
- Trailer Park Boys
