= Bob & Doug McKenzie's Two-Four Anniversary =

- Written by: Dave Thomas
- Directed by: Henry Sarwer-Foner
- Starring: Rick Moranis; Dave Thomas; Geddy Lee; Paul Dooley; Martin Short; Ben Stiller; Paul Martin
- Country of origin: Canada
- No. of episodes: 1

Production
- Producer: Jane Welowsky
- Camera setup: Multiple-camera and Single camera
- Running time: 45 minutes original, 94 minutes extended

Original release
- Network: CBC Television
- Release: May 20, 2007

Bob & Doug McKenzie's Two-Four Anniversary is a one-hour Canadian entertainment special featuring the return of the SCTV characters, Bob and Doug McKenzie. Portrayed by Rick Moranis and Dave Thomas, the duo reunited one last time in a retrospective on the characters and their lasting impact on Canadian and American pop culture.

== Overview ==
The special aired May 20, 2007 on the CBC.

"A 25-year plus enduring Canadian franchise credited with defining a national identity. The loveable beer-drinking, back bacon frying, toque-wearing original hosers trace their ascent to popularity following the release of their multiple award-winning, platinum selling album and highest grossing movie of 1983; reveal the fascinating stories of people whose lives were touched, affected or influenced by the extraordinary success of the McKenzie brothers; celebrate key milestones throughout the franchise's history and finally, reveal the men behind it all - Rick Moranis and Dave Thomas".

The program featured several wrap-around segments hosted by Rick Moranis and Dave Thomas as Bob and Doug McKenzie. The duo reunited to reprise the characters on the set of the Great White North, for the first time in over a decade. Several cut-aways included Canadian styled Biography segments, and interviews with many notable Canadians and comedians discussing the impact of the characters. This included former prime minister Paul Martin who introduced and closed the program bemoaning the image of Canadians the McKenzie brothers gave. Also featured was a reunion with Rush front-man Geddy Lee, who was originally featured on the duo's "hit single," "Take Off".

This also marked the final time the characters would appear together in live-action form as related by Dave Thomas of the Toronto Star.

We're probably not going to do anything in live-action again ... I mean, no one our age should ever have to see themselves in HD.

== Celebrity cameos ==
Several celebrities interviewed in the program include:

Tom Cavanagh, Andy Dick, Paul Dooley, Dave Foley, Brian Gable, Tom Green, Matt Groening, Geddy Lee, Barry Pepper, Will Sasso, Paul Shaffer, Martin Short and Ben Stiller.

== Home video release ==
Re-edited by Dave Thomas himself, the special was released on DVD in an extended 94-minute version on November 20, 2007.

Also included are Bob and Doug's first appearances on Saturday Night Live, the Juno Awards and the Hoser Parade in Toronto along with rare footage of the McKenzie Brothers.

Bonus Features also included: seven classic Great White North sketches, the songs "Take Off" and "The Twelve Days of Christmas", Famous People Talking About Bob & Doug, Original McKenzie Commercials, Sounds of the Great White North, A Q&A with Bob and Doug and a free collectible bottle opener.

== See also ==
- Bob and Doug McKenzie
- The Great White North
- Strange Brew
- Bob & Doug (2009 TV series)
- Second City Television
- Brother Bear
- Canadian English
- Beer in Canada
- Hoser
