= Bob & Doug (TV series) =

Canadian animated sitcom

- Genre: Animated sitcom
- Created by: Dave Thomas & Rick Moranis
- Directed by: Ken Cunningham II; Glenn James Brown
- Voices of: Dave Thomas; Dave Coulier; Patrick McKenna; Derek McGrath; Neil Crone; Maurice LaMarche; Ron Pardo; Jayne Eastwood
- Country of origin: Canada
- No. of seasons: 2
- No. of episodes: 15

Production
- Executive producers: Dave Thomas; Rick Moranis
- Running time: 22 minutes
- Production company: Animax Entertainment

Original release
- Network: Global
- Release: April 19, 2009 – June 9, 2011

Bob & Doug is a Canadian animated sitcom that premiered on Global on April 19, 2009. The series is a revival of the SCTV sketch characters Bob and Doug McKenzie.

The first season consisted of ten episodes. The show was produced by Animax Entertainment. The first season premiered on April 19, 2009, and held the first-season finale on June 29, 2009. A short second season of "five secret episodes" has since aired in sporadic form.

The show was originally planned for development by Fox in the United States. At the time it was known as The Animated Adventures of Bob & Doug McKenzie.

== Cast ==
While Dave Thomas, who played Doug in the original CBC sketches, reprised his role for the series. Rick Moranis, who was on hiatus from acting at the time, chose not to provide the voice of Bob, although he was one of the series' executive producers alongside Thomas. Bob was instead voiced by Dave Coulier.

In addition to Thomas and Coulier, the program's cast also included Patrick McKenna, Derek McGrath, Neil Crone, Maurice LaMarche, Ron Pardo and Jayne Eastwood.

== Synopsis ==
The series is set in the fictional town of Maple Lake, a town located just across the Canada–United States border from the fictional American metropolis of JFK City, a hotbed of crime and porn. The show centres on Bob and Doug McKenzie, brothers and stereotypical hosers who work as garbage collectors in Maple Lake.

Other characters in the series include:

- Peggy (Stacey DePass), a bartender at the Skate 'n Bowl,
- Dwight (Michael Dunston), the driver of the McKenzies' garbage truck,
- Dennis (Patrick McKenna), an unemployed scam artist constantly pursuing get-rich-quick schemes,
- Rupert (Ron Pardo), a dimwitted police officer and the McKenzie brothers' cousin,
- Mary Beth (Tracey Hoyt), a television journalist and Rupert's girlfriend,
- Henry Chow (Ho Chow), the owner of the local Chinese restaurant,
- Melvin (Derek McGrath), the mayor of Maple Lake,
- Rev. McRee (Neil Crone), the neighborhood priest.

== Episodes ==
Season	Episodes	Originally released	
Season	Episodes	First released	Last released
1	10	April 19, 2009	June 29, 2009
2	5	May 20, 2011	June 9, 2011

=== Season 1 (2009) ===
After several years in limbo, the series finally premiered on April 19, 2009. Early reviews were mixed. Originally slated for 22 episodes, Global instead cut the season short.

No. overall	No. in season	Title	Written by	Original release date
1	1	"Back to School"	Andrei Nechita	April 19, 2009
Bob and Doug are told they have to go back to school to keep their garbage collection jobs.
2	2	"No Country for Old People"	Jared Miller	April 26, 2009
Bob and Doug are forced to deal with their feisty mother after she is evicted from her nursing home.
3	3	"Dennis Moves In"	R. J. Fried	May 3, 2009
A sleazy friend of Bob and Doug moves in with them and unrest soon forms between the two McKenzie brothers.
4	4	"Ice Road Truckers"	Alex Pearson	May 10, 2009
Bob and Doug try to help a former ice road trucker overcome his fears, but all three wind up stranded in the Arctic.
5	5	"I Want My CBN"	Patrick Baker	May 24, 2009
Bob and Doug send a letter to the station that carries their favorite shows. To their surprise, they are hired to work at the station soon after.
6	6	"Bob Falls in Love"	Ben Oren	May 31, 2009
Bob falls in love with a very unlikely woman. Meanwhile, Doug vows to get revenge after being injured during a hockey game.
7	7	"Bob and Doug Go on Strike"	Lars Kenseth	June 7, 2009
Bob and Doug decide to strike to get better treatment, but some unknown person secretly sabotages their plans.
8	8	"New Management"	Tim Hedrick	June 14, 2009
Peggy loses the Skate 'N Bowl to Dennis in a lawsuit and Bob and Doug find they need a new place to hang out at as a result.
9	9	"Bob and Doug Forever"	Patrick Baker, Kevin Pedersen	June 21, 2009
Bob and Doug face the prospect that they might die one day in the future.
10	10	"Country Club"	Alex Pearson	June 29, 2009
Bob and Doug are invited to join a country club, but soon discover that things are not what they were led to believe.

=== Season 2 (2011) ===
This season is made-up of "five secret episodes" which were aired in Canada, according to the official website. Much is unknown about this season, information regarding scheduling and airdates remain unconfirmed.

No. overall	No. in season	Title	Written by	Original release date
11	1	"Doug Quits Drinking"	Unknown	May 20, 2011
Doug decides to quit drinking beer after attending an Alcohol Abstaining meeting by accident.
12	2	"Maple Lake Monster"	Unknown	June 2, 2011
13	3	"Eco-Terrorists"	Unknown	June 4, 2011
14	4	"The Party That Ate Maple Lake"	Unknown	June 6, 2011
15	5	"Asian Mob"	Unknown	June 9, 2011

Conflicting sources describe the order of the show as 15 episodes rather than 22. A statement from the Animax website has stated that there is some form of movement with airing the show in the US. Several more episodes are reportedly still in development, with a release date still to be determined.

== Shorts ==
From 2002 to 2009, a handful of animated shorts have been released to promote the series. Both Dave Thomas and Rick Moranis have provided their voices in first three shorts.

- The first short was released as a special feature on the Strange Brew DVD as an early awareness trailer.
- During production, another short featured the characters hosting a PowerPoint presentation for Animax Entertainment, via the company's website.
- To promote the series launch, another short was an animated version of the duo's famous Twelve Days of Christmas from their 1981 album, The Great White North.
- Two trailers have also been released online to promote the series, the first premiered at the 2008 New York Comic Con.
- The last known short was an internet greeting from the characters to promote Canada Day and Canwest's upcoming marathon via email. This short was introduced shortly after the first season ended its run on Global TV.

== See also ==
- The Great White North
- Strange Brew
- Bob & Doug McKenzie's Two-Four Anniversary
