= Bob and Doug McKenzie =

Canadian comedy duo portrayed by Rick Moranis and Dave Thomas

- Promotional still from Strange Brew with Bob (left) and Doug McKenzie (right)
- First appearance: SCTV (September 19, 1980)
- Created by: Rick Moranis and Dave Thomas
- Portrayed by: Bob - Rick Moranis (most appearances), Dave Coulier (Bob & Doug); Doug - Dave Thomas

In-universe information
- Nicknames: "Hoser", "Hosehead", "Knob"
- Occupation: Television hosts, bottling line inspectors, garbage men
- Nationality: Canadian

Bob and Doug McKenzie are a pair of fictional Canadian brothers who hosted "Great White North", a sketch introduced on the third season of SCTV, when the series moved to CBC Television in 1980. Bob is played by Rick Moranis and Doug is played by Dave Thomas. Although created originally as filler to both satisfy and mock network Canadian content demands, the duo became a pop culture phenomenon in both Canada and the United States. Their popularity was bolstered by the 1981 comedy album The Great White North and 1983 feature film Strange Brew. The characters were later revived for the 2009 animated series Bob & Doug.

== History ==
"Great White North" (originally known as "Kanadian Korner") is a panel show that played upon Canadian stereotypes. Bob and Doug, two dim-witted beer-swilling brothers wearing heavy winter clothing and tuques, would comment on various elements of Canadian life and culture, frequently employing the interjection "Eh?" and derisively calling each other "hoser." Among the topics discussed were snow routes, the Canadarm, the inappropriateness of bedtime stories about dog fights, flat tires, and "why there aren't enough parking spaces at take-out doughnut shops."

The sketch was conceived when SCTV moved to the CBC television network. Due to the difference in the amount of time allocated for commercials, each episode to be broadcast on that network was two minutes longer than those syndicated to the United States. The CBC network heads asked the show's producers to add specifically identifiably Canadian content for those two minutes, in line with government broadcast regulations. Rick Moranis and Dave Thomas thought that this was a ridiculous request, given that the show had been taped in Canada, with a mostly Canadian cast and crew, for two years. The request inspired them to create a parody that would incorporate every aspect of the humorous stereotype of Canadians.

The segments were videotaped at the end of a day's shooting, with just Thomas and Moranis and a single camera operator. The sketches were for the most part improvised on the set, after which they would select the best ones for use on the program.

Moranis recalled, "We went on the stage with no preparation, and did 15 [sketches]. Two of them were lousy, in three we cracked up and fell apart... maybe six were keepers." Added Dave Thomas in a 2000 interview, "Rick and I used to sit in the studio, by ourselves – almost like happy hour – drink real beers, cook back bacon, literally make hot snack food for ourselves while we improvised and just talked. It was all very low key and stupid, and we thought, 'Well, they get what they deserve. This is their Canadian content. I hope they like it.'"

To their shock, the comedians found that this filler material had become the most popular part of the show. Though initially intended for Canadian TV only, some of the two-minute "Great White North" segments would find their way into U.S. versions of the 30-minute shows due to a shortage of content that week. When NBC ordered the 90-minute shows for the 1981 season, they specifically cited good affiliate feedback on the "two dumb Canadian characters" and requested that the characters be included in every program.

They rode the crest of a fad, peaking in 1982–83, that produced one comedy album, The Great White North, and a movie, Strange Brew. The debut album, conceived and championed by Perry Goldberg, the Director of National Promotion of Anthem Records in Canada (26), also released on Mercury Records in the US, went platinum in sales, won a Grammy nomination and broke the Top 10 on Billboard's Top LPs and Tapes list in March, 1982. It is noted for the song "Take Off" which featured fellow Canadian Geddy Lee of the rock group Rush chorusing between the McKenzies' banter. The song was #1 for 2 weeks on the CHUM Charts, December 12 and 19, 1981. On this album, they also sing their own improvised version of "The Twelve Days of Christmas", which is frequently played on the radio around the holidays in both Canada and the United States. While hugely popular in the U.S., the album was also #1 in Canada for six weeks, suggesting that Canadians appreciated the duo as an affectionate self-parody.

The Strange Brew movie was released by MGM in 1983. While receiving only minimal praise from critics, it performed fairly well at the box office – earning $8.5 million in the U.S. alone to cover its $4 million budget. After its theatrical release, Strange Brew remained a popular home-video title with a strong college cult following.

The 1983 soundtrack album for Strange Brew featured dialogue and music from the film, as well as new skits specifically based on the movie. The album sold poorly and was out-of-print soon after.

The sketch's signature "Coo loo coo coo, coo coo coo coo"theme, according to Dave Thomas in an interview on CBC News: The Hour, is an exaggeration of the flute music used in 60-second Canadian television nature vignettes, such as Hinterland Who's Who.

Thomas and Moranis revived the characters for a 2023 Beer Canada commercial advocating for a freeze on new federal taxes on beer.

== Appearances on SCTV ==
The duo had a total of 41 original segments on SCTV. Presumably filmed several at a time, most "Great White North" segments featured one two-minute sketch per SCTV episode. 25 segments were aired in the third season (1980–81).

Most of Season 4, Cycle 1 (1981) was made up of "Great White North" repeat segments. The only new appearances were in episodes 4/1-2 and 4/1-9, the final episode of the cycle. The final episode included a wraparound storyline which heavily featured the characters.

Growing in popularity, the characters returned for nine new segments in the second cycle of season 4. Cycle 2 (1981–82) featured a new "Great White North" segment in each episode.

Season 4, Cycle 3 (1982) was the last season to feature the characters. The first episode's plot revolves around the growing popularity of Bob and Doug, and they are given their own variety show on SCTV, which turns into a catastrophe. The characters returned in the next episode for a new segment in their traditional studio set, but it had been cut to one minute (the episode's storyline owing the reduced air time to their disastrous variety show). The two are then featured in three more new segments, each back to two minutes long, before Rick Moranis and Dave Thomas left SCTV to film Strange Brew.

== Legacy ==
The duo revived the act in two award-winning television commercials for Pizza Hut in 1984 and 1986 and a two-year campaign for the Molson Brewing Company in 1999 and 2000 consisting of more than a dozen television and radio commercials which aired nationally in the U.S.

McFarlane Toys produced Bob and Doug McKenzie action figures in September 2000.

In the 2000 video game Spyro: Year of the Dragon (and the 2018 remaster), the polar bear NPCs at the start and end of Icy Peak are named Bob and Doug.

In 2003, the fastest computer in Canada, which is used by the Department of Astronomy and Astrophysics at the University of Toronto, was named after Bob and Doug. The $900,000 computer is being used to simulate supermassive black holes and collisions of galaxies. The machine, nicknamed McKenzie, has 268 gigabytes of memory and 40 terabytes of disk space, and consists of two master nodes (Bob and Doug), 256 compute nodes, and eight development nodes.

They played a variant of the act for the Walt Disney Pictures animated feature film Brother Bear and its sequel, with their characters being the voices of a pair of goofy bull moose named Rutt and Tuke. They also recorded a commentary for the movie that is seen on the DVD.

A new special, Bob & Doug McKenzie's Two-Four Anniversary, aired on May 20, 2007, on CBC Television. It is a retrospective on the history of the characters and their popularity, featuring interviews with various celebrities, classic clips, and new material featuring the pair. It includes an introduction by former Canadian Prime Minister Paul Martin and a cameo appearance by Rush lead singer Geddy Lee. On November 20, 2007, the special was released on DVD. The DVD, re-edited by Thomas himself, was twice as long as the broadcast and featured several classic McKenzie sketches from SCTV in their entirety, new footage filmed on the Great White North set and an hour's worth of bonus features. A Bob and Doug McKenzie bottle opener was included with every DVD.

Rush used a short film of Bob and Doug McKenzie as an intro to the song "The Larger Bowl" during their 2007 Snakes & Arrows Tour.

Animax Entertainment, founded by Dave Thomas in 2001, began producing a new animated series for the Global Television Network based on the characters. The Bob & Doug animated series debuted April 19, 2009, with Thomas reprising the character of Doug. Moranis chose not to voice the character of Bob in the new series; the part was instead voiced by Dave Coulier. Moranis was however involved in the series as an executive producer. The show aired 15 episodes.

They returned to the Great White North at a charity event held in Toronto in 2017 to help raise money for patients with spinal cord injuries. Jake Thomas, son of musician Ian Thomas and Dave's nephew had been in a snowmobile accident that paralyzed him from the waist down. Raising money for the family was reason enough to convince Moranis, known for keeping a low profile, to reprise his role as Bob for the first time in 10 years. With celebrity friends such as Dan Aykroyd, Martin Short, Eugene Levy and Catherine O'Hara performing skits, the gig was sold out. Over $325,000 was raised and will go towards the Jake Thomas's Road to Recovery GoFundMe campaign and the Spinal Cord Injury Ontario, in order to help others who have sustained spinal cord injuries.

The SYFY network show "Z-Nation" Season 4, Episode 8 - 'Crisis of Faith', featured the main characters entering Canada, and running into RCMP officers, a Hockey team bearing the Canada logo and of course, zombies very reminiscent of Bob & Doug McKenzie. The cast members who confront the look-alikes used the GWN catch phrases "eh", and "hoser" among others.

On March 24, 2020, a statue of Bob and Doug McKenzie was erected in Edmonton, Alberta, where the SCTV series was taped during most of the early 1980s. It depicts Bob and Doug enjoying a beer on a bench, and is near the Rogers Place arena. The statue was the result of a collaboration between local sculptor Ritchie Velthuis, the non-profit SCTV Monument Committee, and Calgary's Bronzart Casting. Actors Rick Moranis and Dave Thomas provided input throughout the process.

Astronauts Robert L. Behnken and Douglas Hurley are likened to the McKenzies because of their friendship when they participated in the first commercial astronaut launch on 30 May 2020, SpaceX Crew Dragon Demo-2.

== Opinions of the creators ==
In Dave Thomas's behind-the-scenes book on SCTV, he reports that he and Moranis disliked the characters because they felt the network forced the characters on them and that they, as actors, were overly identified with the dimwitted, beer-drinking duo. However, in an interview accompanying the Two-Four Anniversary premiere, Thomas credited the McKenzie Brothers as a successful comedic creation of which he was quite proud.

== Discography ==
- Bob & Doug McKenzie: The Great White North, 1981
- Bob & Doug McKenzie: Strange Brew, 1983

== See also ==
- List of one-hit wonders in the United States
- Beer in Canada
- Canadian English
- Canadian humour
- The Red Green Show
- Trailer Park Boys
- MacLean & MacLean
