= An Afternoon with SCTV =

Canadian-American comedy television special

- Genre: Sketch comedy
- Directed by: Martin Scorsese
- Presented by: Jimmy Kimmel
- Starring: Joe Flaherty; Eugene Levy; Catherine O'Hara; Andrea Martin; Martin Short; Dave Thomas; Rick Moranis
- Countries of origin: Canada; United States
- Original language: English

Production
- Executive producers: Andrew Alexander; Emma Tillinger Koskoff; Lindsay Cox
- Production companies: Insight Productions; Sikelia Productions

Original release
- Network: CTV (Canada); Netflix (International)

Related
- Second City Television

An Afternoon with SCTV is an unreleased Canadian-American comedy television special directed by Martin Scorsese for Netflix and CTV, which was to feature a reunion of the cast of Second City Television.

Scorsese began work on the project in 2018 but abandoned it prior to completion. Netflix eventually announced it would release a version with more recent interview footage, directed by Jason Hehir, titled SCTV: The Greatest Show You've Never Heard Of, on October 30, 2026.

== Production ==
=== Development ===
On April 12, 2018, Netflix announced that Martin Scorsese would direct a then-untitled television special reuniting the cast of Second City Television including Joe Flaherty, Eugene Levy, Andrea Martin, Catherine O'Hara, Martin Short, and Dave Thomas. Jimmy Kimmel was set as the special's moderator. Producers of the special were expected to include Andrew Alexander, Emma Tillinger Koskoff, and Lindsay Cox. According to Alexander, Scorsese and the SCTV cast had planned to film new comedy sketches to include in the special, but could not schedule around other prior commitments.

On May 10, 2018, it was reported CTV would co-produce the special and premiere it in Canada. Additionally, it was confirmed that Rick Moranis would take part in the reunion with his fellow cast members and that additional footage filmed over the summer.

Tickets went on sale to the public on April 23, 2018.

=== Filming ===
The special was filmed at the Elgin Theatre in Toronto, Ontario, Canada on May 13, 2018. The filming reportedly lasted around three hours and played to a live audience of around 1,500 people.

Some crew members of the original show were in attendance as well, including costume designer Juul Haalmeyer, make-up artist Beverly Schechtman and show producer Andrew Alexander. Extended family of the cast were also in attendance, among them Eugene Levy's son Dan Levy and John Candy's widow Rosemary Hobor and their two children, Jennifer and Christopher Candy.

== Release ==
The special was scheduled to be released on Netflix internationally and CTV in Canada.

On May 12, 2021, Joe Flaherty revealed in a Facebook comment on a SCTV fan group that the special had been shelved. However, the following day, on May 13 (exactly three years to the day after the special was filmed) Netflix revealed the special had not been shelved, but delayed due to director Martin Scorsese's other commitments. As of 2026, it has not been released. Two people who took part in the reunion (Flaherty and O'Hara) have since died.

In August 2026, Netflix announced a documentary titled SCTV: The Greatest Show You've Never Heard Of, directed by Jason Hehir with Kimmel as an executive producer, to be released on October 30. Netflix promotional material describes the documentary as including footage of a reunion in Toronto. Kimmel confirmed that the project had fallen off Scorsese's "field of vision", adding that, while some parts intended for the original special were used, the 2018 reunion footage had to be abandoned as it felt "dated". A new cast reunion was recorded in 2025, prior to O'Hara's death.
