= Hoser =

Canadian slang term

Hoser or hose-head is a slang term originating in Canada that is used to reference or imitate Canadians.

The term "hoser" is a comedic label given to someone that gained popularity and notoriety from the comedic skits by Rick Moranis and Dave Thomas (playing the characters of Bob and Doug McKenzie) in SCTV's "The Great White North" segments. The characters also used the verb 'to hose' as a synonym for 'to swindle'.

== Origins ==
The origin of the term is unclear. The Oxford English Dictionary records the first use in writing as being a 1981 Toronto Star article about the McKenzie brothers, and there is no clear evidence that the term was in use before then. Nonetheless, the term has spawned several popular false etymologies.

- A popular origin story holds that in outdoor ice hockey before ice resurfacers, the losing team in a hockey game would have to hose down the rink after a game to make the ice smooth again. Thus the term hoser was synonymous with loser.
- Another suggestion for the origin of the term involves farmers of the Canadian Prairies who would siphon gasoline from farming vehicles with a hose during the Great Depression of the 1930s.
- "Hosed" is also a euphemism for drunkenness in Canadian English, and by extension a hoser is one who is drunk.
- Another possible origin may stem from loggers' slang, where "hoosier" referred contemptuously to an untrained, inept, or slack worker.
- One theory is that it was derived from the term "hose bag" which was a popular insult amongst suburban Toronto high school students in the 1970s. The term was shortened to "hoser" to thwart the rebuffs of school teachers and parents who found "hose bag" offensive.

== See also ==
- Canadian slang
- Eh
- Redneck
- Hillbilly
- List of ethnic slurs
- Strange Brew
- Yoga Hosers
