= The Great White North (album) =

Studio album by Bob and Doug McKenzie
- Released: 1981
- Recorded: 1980–1981
- Genre: Comedy
- Length: 44:20
- Labels: Anthem (Canada); Mercury (U.S.)

Bob and Doug McKenzie chronology
The Great White North (1981)	Strange Brew (1983)

The Great White North is a Canadian comedy album by the fictional television characters Bob and Doug McKenzie (portrayed by actors Rick Moranis and Dave Thomas), released in 1981 by Anthem Records (ANR-1-1036) and distributed in the United States by Mercury Records (SRM-1-4034). The title is a nickname for Canada, also used as the title of a Second City Television (SCTV) sketch featuring Bob and Doug. This album's release tied in with SCTV at the height of the characters' popularity, and a still from the show is on its cover. In its sleeve is a newspaper parody called The Daily Hoser.

== Sales ==
At least one million copies of the album were sold in North America, 350,000 of these in Canada alone; this earned a triple-platinum certification from the Canadian Recording Industry Association for the album.

The Great White North entered the RPM Canadian album charts at #3 on 12 December 1981 and rose to the #1 position the following week where it remained until 23 January 1982. Overall, RPM ranked the album #40 of albums released in Canada during 1981. It peaked at number 8 on the American Billboard 200 album chart in 1982.

== "Take Off" ==
The song "Take Off" (identified on the album as "the hit single section"), features guest vocalist Geddy Lee of Rush, an elementary schoolmate of Moranis. In the spoken introduction to the song, Lee utters the famous joke “ten bucks is ten bucks” as his motivation for appearing on the song, after a reminder of his deal with the brothers' lawyer. It was a hit, peaking at number 16 on the Billboard 100 singles chart in March 1982, five spots higher than Rush's most popular U.S. song, "New World Man", released a year later. It reached #14 on the Cash Box chart and #5 on WLS-AM in Chicago. On Canada's CHUM Charts it was No. 1 for 2 weeks.

== Track listing ==
=== Side 1 ===
1. "This is our album, eh?" - 3:40
2. "The Beerhunter" - 2:23 This sketch is a beer-drinking game based on The Deer Hunter: Russian Roulette with beer cans.
3. "School Announcements" - 1:52 This sketch features Doug (Thomas) as a school vice-principal who encourages his charges to "have a beer and talk" at his office.
4. "The Miracle of Music" - 0:41 Doug plays the Great White North theme by blowing across beer bottles containing varying levels of liquid.
5. "Peter's Donuts" - 3:02 Bob and Doug sit inside a donut shop as their vehicle gets towed, due to being parked on the street because the shop has very few parking spaces.
6. "Gimme A Smoke" - 2:00
7. "Take Off" - 4:46 This track features singing by guest vocalist Geddy Lee of Rush
8. "Coffee Sandwich" - 2:26

=== Side 2 ===
1. "Welcome to Side Two" - 0:58
2. "Doug's Mouth" - 3:33
3. "Elron McKenzie" - 2:28 A clergyman gives a sermon on the evils of killing "bugs".
4. "Black Holes" - 2:06 There is a backwards message on this track.
5. "You Are Our Guest" - 2:14 The duo's exaggerated accents pronounce "are" and "our" as homophones for comedic effect. Listeners play the "guest" by reading the enclosed script.
6. "Ernie's Mom" - 1:54
7. "The Twelve Days of Christmas" - 4:46 A comedic rewrite of the popular Christmas carol; the duo only makes it as far as Day 8 before deciding the song has run long enough.
8. "Ralph The Dog" - 3:11
9. "Okay, This is the End, eh?" - 1:57
10. "Honest" - 0:31

Side 2 of the original vinyl album also includes a very brief unlabeled track of Bob McKenzie (Moranis) saying the two words "black hole" and then laughing just before the "You Are Our Guest" segment. This is a callback to the fourth track on side 2 called "Black Holes", in which Bob insists the spaces between tracks of a vinyl album are black holes.

== Reception and legacy ==
Liam Lacey's review of the album in The Globe and Mail concluded on a negative sentiment, noting the production was "entertaining listening - about twice. Other hosers are going to find it extremely confusing."

=== Awards ===
In 1982, this album received the Juno Award for Comedy Album of the Year.

In 1983, it was nominated for the Grammy Award for Best Comedy Album, but lost to Richard Pryor: Live on the Sunset Strip.

=== In other media ===
Track #7, "Take Off" is featured in The Simpsons Season 13 episode, "The Bart Wants What It Wants".

"Take Off" is also featured in Ash vs. Evil Dead Season 2 episode, "DUI".

Featured among other classic artists, track #15, "The Twelve Days of Christmas" also appears on a compilation album entitled, A Rock 'n' Roll Christmas II.

"The Twelve Days of Christmas" is included on Dr. Demento Presents: The Greatest Christmas Novelty CD of All Time.

== See also ==
- List of one-hit wonders in the United States
- Strange Brew
- Bob & Doug McKenzie's Two-Four Anniversary
- Bob & Doug (2009 TV series)
- Second City Television
- Brother Bear - an animated film in which Thomas and Moranis provided the voices of two Canadian moose characters similar to the McKenzie brothers.
