= Strange Brew (soundtrack) =

Soundtrack album by Bob and Doug McKenzie
- Released: 1983
- Recorded: 1983
- Genre: Soundtrack
- Length: 42:00
- Labels: PolyGram; Mercury; Anthem
- Producers: Marc Giacomelli; Rick Shurman; Ian Thomas

Bob and Doug McKenzie chronology
The Great White North (1981)	Strange Brew (1983)

Strange Brew is the soundtrack album to the 1983 comedy film, Strange Brew. It was released in August 1983 by PolyGram and Anthem Records of Canada (ANR 1-1042). (Full title: The Adventures of Bob and Doug McKenzie Strange Brew Excerpts from the Original Soundtrack). Unlike most soundtrack tie-ins, the album features continuing comedy sketches by the title duo, Bob and Doug McKenzie (Rick Moranis and Dave Thomas). Most of the album is sketches and film dialogue, while the music sampling is usually accompanied by the characters' commentary. The main title theme was performed by Thomas' brother, Ian Thomas. The album was produced by Marc Giacomelli, Rick Shurman and Ian Thomas. The album was only available for a short amount of time and was finally reissued on CD in 2026 on the 44 3/4 Anniversary retrospective which brings the album along with the film of the same name on Blu Ray and the Great White North album together in one package. This is the second and final album released by the duo.

== Awards ==
The soundtrack won the Juno Award for Best Comedy Album in 1984. Bob and Doug accepted the award in person at the awards ceremony, held 5 December 1984, which also happened to be hosted by SCTV alums, Joe Flaherty and Andrea Martin.

== Track listing ==
No.	Title	Length
1.	"This Isn't Our Second Album"	4:01
2.	"Welcome to Our Movie / Mutants"	3:15
3.	"Mutants of 2051 II"	3:22
4.	"I Didn't Do it, You Knob"	1:54
5.	"Mouse in a Bottle (Film Dialogue)"	5:33
6.	"Strange Brew"	3:37
7.	"Behind the Scenes"	0:58
8.	"Shakespeare Horked Our Script"	1:53
9.	"The Game (Film Dialogue)"	2:44
10.	"I Did it, You Knob"	1:57
11.	"The Chase (Film Dialogue)"	3:50
12.	"I Did it Again, You Knob"	1:26
13.	"The Love Theme"	1:34
14.	"Another Strange Brew (Film Dialogue)"	5:21
Total length:		42:00

== Motion picture score ==
As with the soundtrack album, the motion picture score was released for a short amount of time and remains out of print. The album runs approximately 63 minutes in length and was composed and conducted by Charles Fox.
