= Rick Moranis =

Canadian comedian and actor (born 1953)

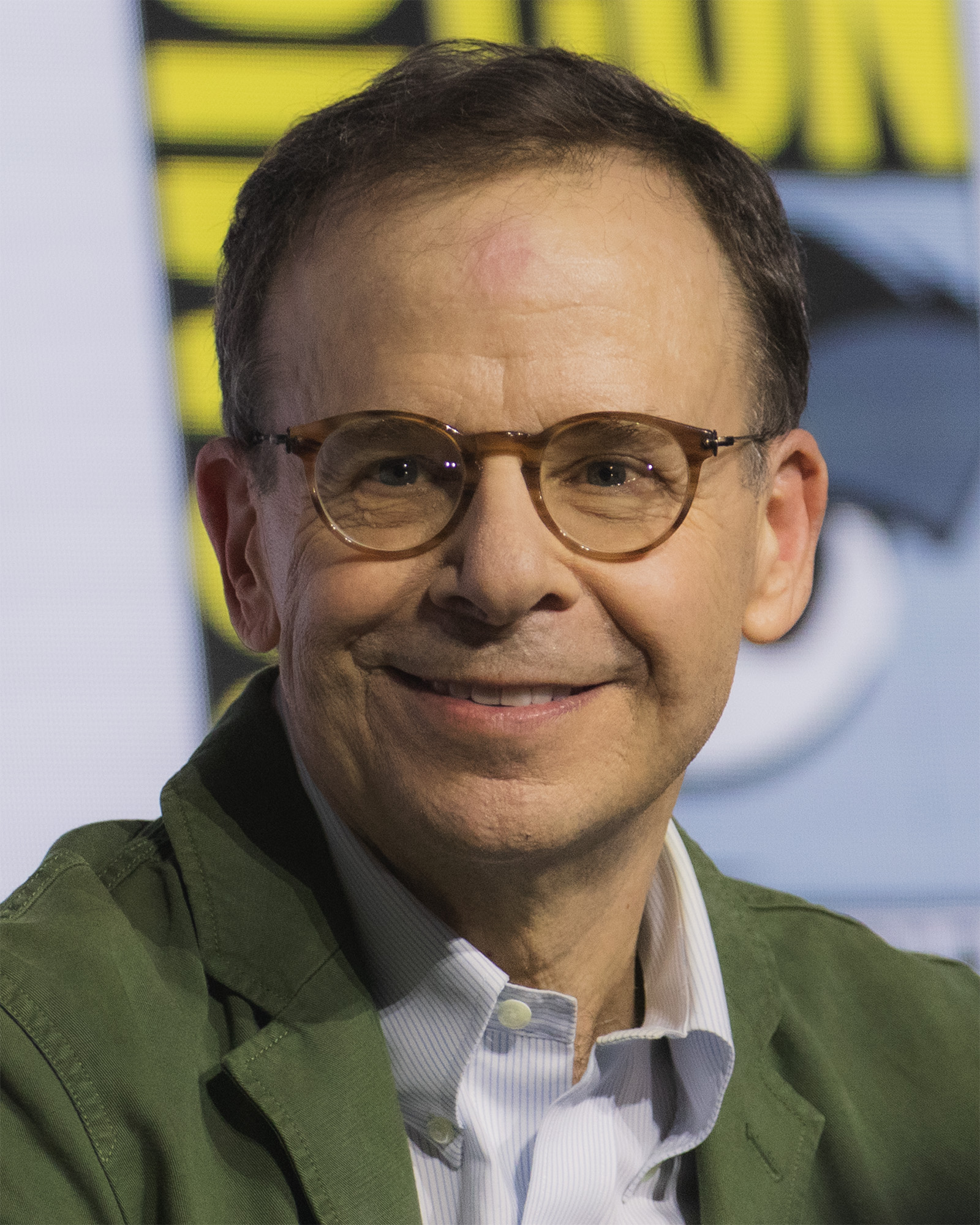
- Moranis at the 2026 San Diego Comic-Con
- Born: Frederick Allan Moranis; April 18, 1953 (age 73); Toronto, Ontario, Canada
- Occupations: Actor; comedian
- Years active: 1976–present
- Spouse: Ann Belsky (m. 1986; died 1991)
- Children: 2

Frederick Allan Moranis (/məˈrænɪs/; born April 18, 1953) is a Canadian comedian and actor, known for roles in several feature films in the 1980s. He appeared in the sketch comedy series Second City Television (SCTV) in the 1980s. He then starred in several Hollywood films, including Strange Brew (1983), Streets of Fire (1984), Ghostbusters (1984) and its sequel Ghostbusters II (1989), Little Shop of Horrors (1986), Spaceballs (1987), Honey, I Shrunk the Kids (1989, and its 1992 and 1997 sequels), Parenthood (1989), My Blue Heaven (1990), and The Flintstones (1994).

Following the death of his wife in 1991, Moranis reduced his work in the entertainment industry, and beginning in 1997 he dedicated his time to their two children. During this period he performed occasionally, including a voice role in Disney's Brother Bear (2003), comedy albums, and appearances at fan conventions. In 2020, he signed to reprise his role from Honey, I Shrunk the Kids, in a sequel, but the project was shelved due to the COVID-19 pandemic. He has signed to reprise the role of Dark Helmet in Spaceballs: The New One, scheduled for release in 2027.

== Early life ==
Moranis was born on April 18, 1953, in Toronto, Ontario, to a Jewish family. He attended elementary school with Geddy Lee, frontman of the rock band Rush.

== Career ==
His career as an entertainer began as a radio disc jockey in the mid-1970s, using the on-air name "Rick Allan" at Toronto radio stations CFTR, CKFH, 1050 CHUM and CHUM-FM.

In the mid-1970s, Moranis and comedy partner Rob Cowan, also a budding young radio announcer, performed on CBC-TV. Their spoof of Hockey Night in Canada was popular, and they periodically performed it on the road, including a charity sports dinner in Sarnia, Ontario.

In 1977, he teamed up with Winnipeg-born writer/director and performer Ken Finkleman on a series of live performances on CBC's 90 Minutes Live; comedy radio specials; and television comedy pilots, including one called Midweek and another called 1980 (produced at CBC Toronto in 1979). Both pilots starred Finkleman and Moranis in a series of irreverent sketches, including an early mockumentary sketch featuring Moranis as a Canadian movie producer, and another featuring the dubbed-in voiceovers of Nazi war criminals as they appear to be discussing their Hollywood agents and the money one can earn being interviewed on major documentary series like The World at War.

In 1980, Moranis was persuaded to join the third-season cast of Second City Television (SCTV) by friend and SCTV writer/performer Dave Thomas. At the time, Moranis was the only cast member not to have come from a Second City stage troupe. He became especially noted for his impressions of celebrities such as Woody Allen, Merv Griffin, David Brinkley, George Carlin, Michael McDonald, and Teri Shields (mother of Brooke).

With SCTV moving to CBC in 1980 (and syndicated in the United States), Moranis and Thomas were challenged to fill two additional minutes with "identifiable Canadian content", and created a sketch called The Great White North featuring the characters Bob and Doug McKenzie, a couple of Canadian buffoons. By the time NBC ordered 90-minute programs for the U.S. in 1981 (the fourth season of SCTV overall), there had been such favourable feedback from affiliates on the McKenzies that the network requested the duo have a sketch in every show.

Bob and Doug became a pop-culture phenomenon, which led to a top-selling and Grammy-nominated album, Great White North, and the 1983 movie Strange Brew, Moranis's first major film role. He followed that up with the 1984 movie Streets of Fire.

Another notable Moranis character on SCTV was Gerry Todd, a disc jockey who presented music clips on television. The sketch aired before the debut of MTV in the United States, leading both Sound & Vision and Martin Short to dub Moranis as the creator of the video jockey. "There had been no such thing" up until that point, recalled Short, so "the joke was that there would be such a thing."

=== Feature films ===
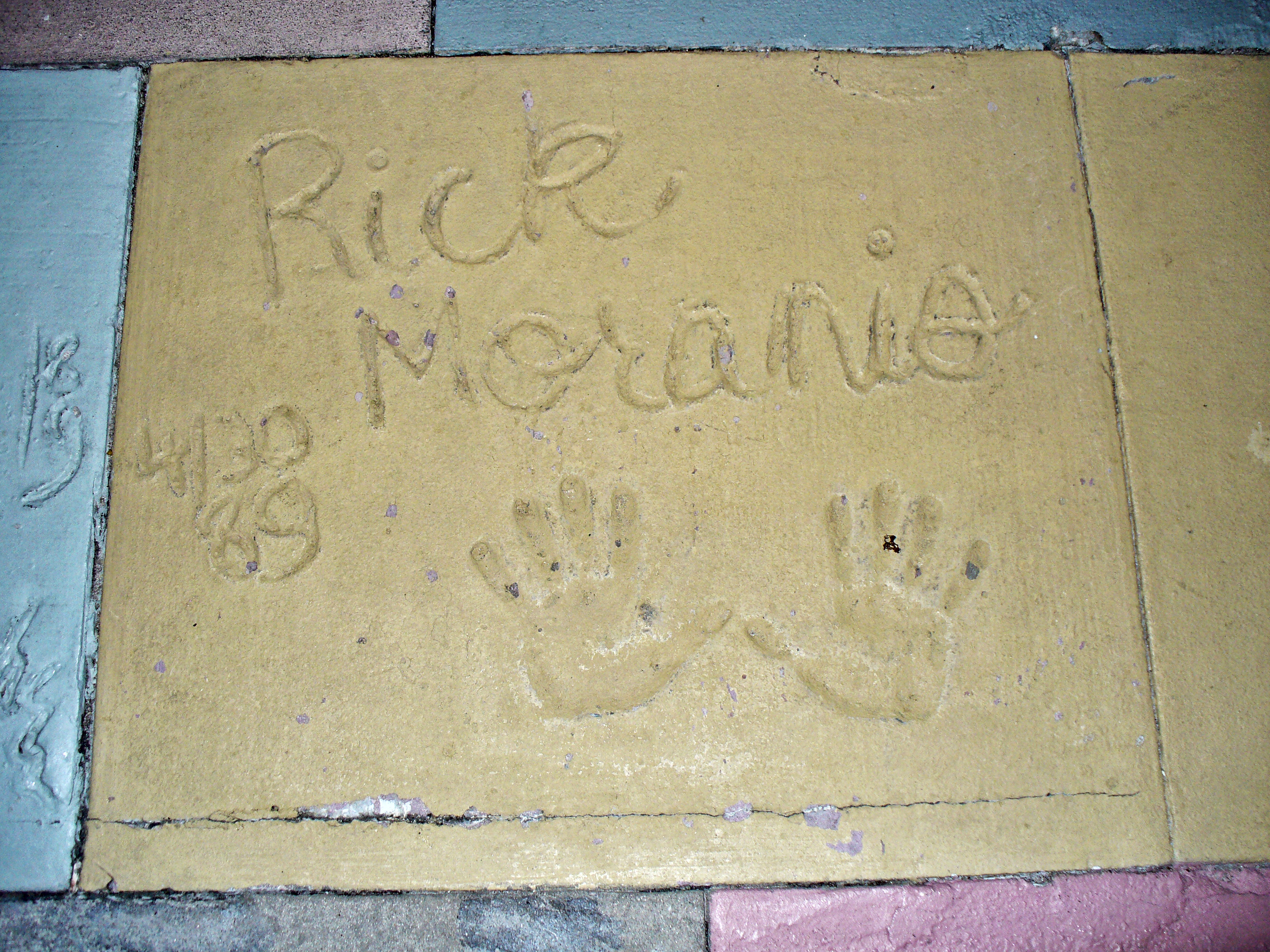
The handprints of Rick Moranis in front of the Chinese Theatre at Disney's Hollywood Studios in Walt Disney World

After his SCTV work, and the Strange Brew and Streets of Fire movies, Moranis had a busy career in feature films that lasted over a decade, most notably Ghostbusters (1984) and its sequel, Ghostbusters II (1989); Brewster's Millions (1985); Little Shop of Horrors (1986); Spaceballs (1987); Honey, I Shrunk the Kids (1989) and its 1992 and 1997 sequels; Parenthood (1989); My Blue Heaven (1990); and Barney Rubble in The Flintstones (1994). He also did the voice-over for a short-lived cartoon series on NBC called Gravedale High (1990).

Moranis was also slated to appear (as the janitor) in the 1985 John Hughes film The Breakfast Club. After a week or so of filming, Moranis was released by producer Ned Tanen because he felt Moranis's interpretation of the role as an over-the-top Russian caricature was not appropriate for the serious nature of the film. Moranis presented the departure as a mutual decision and hoped to work with Hughes in the future.

Moranis was originally cast as Phil Berquist in the 1991 film City Slickers, but later dropped out before filming began due to his wife's illness.

Moranis's last film roles were the box-office flops Little Giants (1994) and Big Bully (1996). Disney's final film in the Honey, I Shrunk the Kids franchise is 1997's direct-to-video film Honey, We Shrunk Ourselves, in which Moranis is the final remaining original cast member. The series Honey, I Shrunk the Kids: The TV Show also launched in 1997 but without Moranis; it concluded in 2000. He worked for Disney twice more (with his fellow SCTV alumnus Dave Thomas), voicing Rutt the moose in the 2003 animated film Brother Bear and its 2006 direct-to-video sequel.

In a 2004 interview, Moranis talked about his favourite kinds of films:

On the last couple of movies I made—big-budget Hollywood movies—I really missed being able to create my own material. In the early movies I did, I was brought in to basically rewrite my stuff, whether it was Ghostbusters or Spaceballs. By the time I got to the point where I was "starring" in movies, and I had executives telling me what lines to say, that wasn't for me. I'm really not an actor. I'm a guy who comes out of comedy, and my impetus was always to rewrite the line to make it funnier, not to try to make somebody's precious words work.

=== Acting hiatus ===
In 1997, Moranis took a hiatus from working in the film industry. He later explained, "I'm a single parent and I just found that it was too difficult to manage to raise my kids and to do the traveling involved in making movies. So I took a little bit of a break. And the little bit of a break turned into a longer break, and then I found that I really didn't miss it."

After declining to make a cameo appearance in the 2016 Ghostbusters film, Moranis clarified that he had not, in fact, retired from acting in films, but instead had become selective about future roles.

=== Later work ===
In 2001, Moranis received his first film credit since 1997 when he provided voice work in the animated film Rudolph the Red-Nosed Reindeer and the Island of Misfit Toys.

As of 2004, Moranis was on the Advisory Committee for the comedy program at Humber College.

In 2005, Moranis released an album titled The Agoraphobic Cowboy, featuring country songs with lyrics that Moranis says follow in the comic tradition of songwriters/singers such as Roger Miller, Kinky Friedman, and Jim Stafford. The album was produced by Tony Scherr and is distributed through ArtistShare, as well as Moranis's official website. Commenting on the origins of the songs, he said that in 2003, "Out of the blue, I just wrote a bunch of songs. For lack of a better explanation, they're more country than anything. And I actually demoed four or five of them, and I'm not sure at this point what I'm going to do with them—whether I'm going to fold them into a full-length video or a movie. But, boy, I had a good time doing that."

On December 8, 2005, The Agoraphobic Cowboy was nominated for the 2006 Grammy for Best Comedy Album. On February 3, 2006, Moranis performed "Press Pound" on Late Night with Conan O'Brien and discussed the development of his music career.

In November 2007, Moranis reunited with Dave Thomas for a 24th anniversary special of Bob and Doug McKenzie, titled Bob and Doug McKenzie's 2–4 Anniversary. The duo shot new footage for this special. Thomas subsequently created a new animated Bob and Doug McKenzie series, Bob & Doug, for his company Animax Entertainment. Moranis declined to voice the role of Bob, which was taken over by Dave Coulier, but remained involved in the series as an executive producer.

On June 18, 2013, Moranis released the comedy album titled My Mother's Brisket & Other Love Songs, his first album in eight years. Moranis said of the release, "When I first began writing jokes and sketches with various Jewish partners one of us would inevitably stop at some point and announce, 'Too Jewish!' Too Jewish for the star, the show, the network, or the audience. The songs on this album are all in that category. I grew up hearing the Allan Sherman and the You Don't Have to Be Jewish albums in the '60s. Now I am in my 60s."

In a June 2013 interview, Moranis talked about reprising his role as Louis Tully in a third Ghostbusters film and his disappointment with the sequel. Moranis said, "I haven't talked to Dan Aykroyd about it. Somebody he's associated with called me and I said, 'I wouldn't not do it, but it's got to be good.' You know, I'm not interested in doing anything I've already done, and I thought the second one was a disappointment. But I guess I'm interested in where that guy is now. I sort of see him as being Bernie Madoff's cellmate in jail. Both of them being so orderly that they race to get up and make their beds." In 2015, regarding an offer for a brief appearance in the 2016 film, he concluded, "Ghostbusters didn't appeal to me. I wish them well, but it just makes no sense to me."

In July 2017, Moranis and Dave Thomas reprised their Bob and Doug characters at a benefit concert in Toronto. Proceeds from the benefit went toward caring for Jake Thomas, Dave's nephew, who suffered a spinal cord injury that has left him paralyzed from the waist down.

On May 9, 2018, Moranis returned as the character Pannakin Crybaby / Lord Dark Helmet from Spaceballs in an episode of The Goldbergs, albeit as a voice. He also appeared in an episode of Prop Culture discussing the film.

Moranis appears in the Martin Scorsese–directed Second City TV reunion documentary, titled An Afternoon with SCTV, set to premiere on Netflix.

In 2020, Moranis signed on to reprise his role as Wayne Szalinski in Shrunk, a new sequel in the Honey, I Shrunk the Kids series. It would have marked a return to live-action films for Moranis after a hiatus of over two decades; however, it was put on indefinite hold in the 2020s due to the COVID-19 pandemic and Disney+ moving away from long-form streaming content. Later in 2020, he appeared in a commercial for Mint Mobile alongside Ryan Reynolds.

=== Return to on-screen acting ===
In June 2025, Moranis signed on to reprise the role of Dark Helmet in the sequel to Spaceballs, which is scheduled for release in 2027. Filming for Spaceballs: The New One, which includes Moranis, began in September 2025, thus confirming that the film would result in Moranis making his return to on-screen acting for the first time since 1997. Filming on Spaceballs: The New One wrapped in December 2025.

== Personal life ==
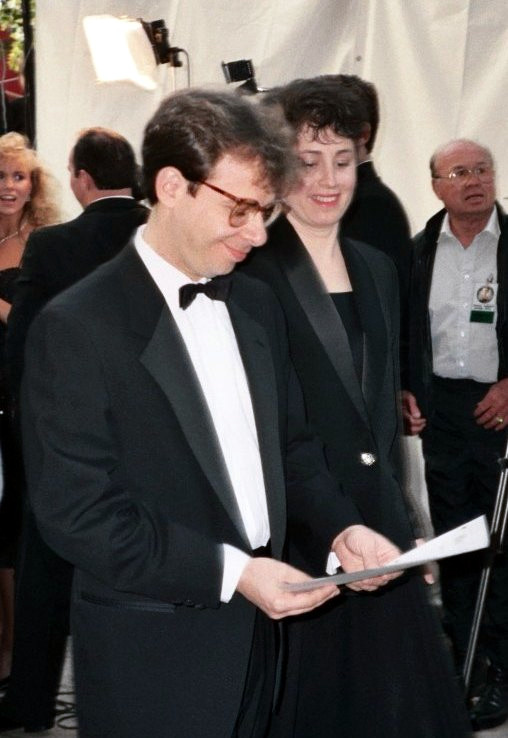
Moranis and his wife Ann in 1990

Moranis married make-up designer Ann Belsky in 1986 and together they had two children: a son and a daughter. Belsky died of breast cancer in February 1991. Moranis then slowly left public life to become a full-time single father.

On October 1, 2020, Moranis was assaulted in New York City in the vicinity of West 70th Street, Manhattan. He suffered minor injuries to his head, back and hip. He reported the incident to the New York Police Department, who posted security footage of the attack. On November 14, 2020, the perpetrator (Marquis Ventura) was arrested in New York City. In 2022, Ventura pled guilty in return for a sentence of two years in prison followed by three years of post-release supervision.

== Filmography ==
=== Film ===
Year	Title	Role	Notes
1983	Strange Brew	Bob McKenzie	Also co-writer and co-director
1984	Streets of Fire	Billy Fish	
1984	Ghostbusters	Louis Tully	
1984	The Wild Life	Harry	
1985	Brewster's Millions	Morty King	
1985	Head Office	Howard Gross	
1986	Club Paradise	Barry Nye	
1986	Little Shop of Horrors	Seymour Krelborn	
1987	Spaceballs	Dark Helmet	
1989	Ghostbusters II	Louis Tully	
1989	Honey, I Shrunk the Kids	Wayne Szalinski	
1989	Parenthood	Nathan Huffner	
1990	My Blue Heaven	Barney Coopersmith	
1991	L.A. Story	Gravedigger	Uncredited cameo
1992	Honey, I Blew Up the Kid	Wayne Szalinski	
1993	Splitting Heirs	Henry Bullock	
1994	The Flintstones	Barney Rubble	
1994	Honey, I Shrunk the Audience!	Wayne Szalinski	
1994	Little Giants	Danny O'Shea	
1996	Big Bully	David Leary	
1997	Honey, We Shrunk Ourselves	Wayne Szalinski	Direct-to-video
2001	Rudolph the Red-Nosed Reindeer and the Island of Misfit Toys	The Toy Taker / Mr. Cuddles (voices)	Direct-to-video
2003	Brother Bear	Rutt (voice)	
2006	Brother Bear 2	Rutt (voice)	Direct-to-video
2026	SCTV: The Greatest Show You've Never Heard Of	Himself	Documentary
2027	Spaceballs: The New One	Dark Helmet	Post-production

=== Television ===
Year	Title	Role	Notes
1979	1980	Various roles	Television pilot
1980–1981	SCTV	Various roles	25 episodes
1981–1982	SCTV Network	Various roles	26 episodes
1982	Twilight Theater		Television film
1983, 1989	Saturday Night Live	Himself	2 episodes
1984	Hockey Night	Coach	Television film
1985	The Last Polka	Linsk Minyk	Television film
1988	The Best of SCTV	Various roles	Television special; also writer
1989	The Rocket Boy	Automatic Safety System	Television film
1990	Gravedale High	Max Schneider (voice)	13 episodes
1990	The Earth Day Special	Vic's Buddy	Television special
1992	Shelley Duvall's Bedtime Stories	Narrator	Episode: "Little Toot & the Loch Ness Monster/ Choo Choo"
1997	Muppets Tonight	Himself	Guest; 1 Episode
2003	Miss Spider's Sunny Patch Kids	Holley (voice)	Television special
2007	Bob & Doug McKenzie's Two-Four Anniversary	Bob McKenzie	Television special
2009–11	Bob & Doug		Co-creator and executive producer
2018	The Goldbergs	Pannakin Crybaby / Lord Dark Helmet (voice)	Episode: "Spaceballs"
2020	Prop Culture	Himself	Episode: "Honey, I Shrunk the Kids"
TBA	An Afternoon with SCTV †	Himself	Television special; filmed in 2018

=== Video games ===
Year	Title	Role	Notes
1994	The Flintstones	Barney Rubble	Arcade game
2003	Brother Bear	Rutt	Platform game

== Discography ==
=== Albums ===
- 1989: You, Me, the Music and Me
- 2005: The Agoraphobic Cowboy
- 2013: My Mother's Brisket & Other Love Songs

Bob and Doug McKenzie

- 1981: The Great White North
- 1983: Strange Brew soundtrack

Other soundtrack appearances

Year	Film	Songs	Artist(s)/Writer(s)	Role
1986	Little Shop of Horrors	"Skid Row Downtown"; "Da-Doo"; "Grow For Me"; "Feed Me (Git It!)"; "Suddenly, Seymour"; "The Meek Shall Inherit"	Howard Ashman, Alan Menken	Seymour Krelborn
1997	Muppets Tonight	"High Hopes" "Salute to the late fifties crooners, obscure British bands and Bill Withers"	Various artists	Himself

=== Audio/video ===
- 1973: "Rock Radio Scrapbook" (as Rick Allan)

== Awards and nominations ==
Year	Association	Category	Work	Result
1982	Primetime Emmy Awards	Outstanding Writing in a Variety or Music Program	SCTV (shared with other writers)	Won
1990	American Comedy Awards	Funniest Supporting Actor in a Motion Picture	Parenthood	Won
1995	Gemini Awards	Earle Grey Award for Best Cast	SCTV	Won
2006	Grammy Awards	Best Comedy Album	The Agoraphobic Cowboy	Nominated
