= Popzilla =

American adult animated sketch comedy television series

- Genre: Sketch comedy Black comedy Parody; Satire
- Created by: R.J. Fried; Tim Hedrick; Jared Miller; Kevin Pedersen; Dave Thomas
- Country of origin: United States
- No. of episodes: 12

Production
- Running time: 22 minutes approx.
- Production companies: Animax Entertainment; MTV Production Development

Original release
- Network: MTV
- Release: September 27 – October 16, 2009

Popzilla is an American adult animated sketch comedy television series that aired on MTV. It premiered on September 27, 2009 following America's Best Dance Crew and ended on October 16 of the same year. The show is produced by Second City Television alum Dave Thomas and is an animated sketch comedy show focused on pop culture, celebrities, and famous figures. Each episode consists of about 30 sketches, each under a minute. Celebrities such as Britney Spears, Kevin Federline, Criss Angel and even fictional characters such as Harry Potter have all been targets in some of the early sketches released on YouTube.

Popzilla is animated in Flash by Animax Entertainment to provide for fast turnaround to cover celebrity news.

== See also ==
- Robot Chicken
- Like, Share, Die
- Mad
- 2DTV
