= Ron Pardo =

Canadian actor

- Born: Chatham, Ontario, Canada
- Occupations: Actor; comedian
- Years active: 1985–present
- Agent: The Characters Talent Agency

Ron Pardo is a Canadian actor and comedian. He has performed roles in over 90 animated series. On Paw Patrol, Pardo has voiced Cap'n Turbot since the first episode. He later voiced the show's breakout villain, Mayor Humdinger, as well as various other characters. Pardo is also known for playing a wide variety of celebrities on the sketch comedy series History Bites.

== Early life ==
Pardo was born in Chatham, Ontario to Anna Mae (née Antaya) and Douglas Pardo. He was raised in Pardoville (named after his ancestors), a small farming hamlet near his birthplace. He went to school in nearby Blenheim, and later studied radio and television at Ryerson University in Toronto, followed by working on-air and as a copywriter at CFCO Radio. Pardo later attended the University of Western Ontario in London to study education and worked as a teacher for 12 years in Cambridge, Ontario.

== Career ==
Ron Pardo realized early on that he had a talent for mimicry, first of cartoon characters and later of celebrities. In 1994, he started performing stand-up comedy, and in 1995, he resigned his teaching position, having won Yuk Yuk's Search for Canada's Funniest New Comic Award. He headlined at comedy clubs and corporate events for several years.

In 1997, Pardo came to the attention of Rick Green, former member of The Frantics. Green hired Pardo to perform several characters for the pilot of Rick's new show History Bites. Pardo starred on the show for five seasons, plus several specials, receiving ensemble cast Gemini Award nominations in 2000, 2005, and 2008.

Pardo provides the voices of Cap'n Turbot and Mayor Humdinger in Paw Patrol, and reprised both roles in Paw Patrol: The Movie, and its 2023 sequel, Paw Patrol: The Mighty Movie. He has also voiced Maxum Man in Sidekick, Newton in the last four episodes of Ned's Newt, and Rupert McKenzie in Bob & Doug, for which he received a 2010 ACTRA outstanding voice performance nomination.

He also voices the title character Quest in the Teletoon animated TV series World of Quest, along with the voice of his sidekick, Graer. Pardo plays many characters, such as Hal-G, in the Spin Master animated series Bakugan Battle Brawlers.

His other animated voice work includes roles in Almost Naked Animals, Wishfart, Totally Spies!, Carl², Braceface, and Ace Ventura: Pet Detective. In 2023, Pardo took over the voice role of Digit LeBoid in PBS Kids' Cyberchase, following the death of the original voice actor, Gilbert Gottfried.

== Awards and nominations ==
Year	Award	Category	Film/TV Show	Result	Ref.
2000	15th Gemini Awards	Best Performance or Host in a Variety Program or Series	History Bites	Nominated	
2005	20th Gemini Awards	Best Ensemble Performance in a Comedy Program or Series	History Bites	Nominated	
2008	23rd Gemini Awards	Best Performance or Host in a Variety Program or Series	History Bites	Nominated	
2010	ACTRA Award	Outstanding Performance – Voice	Bob & Doug	Nominated	
