= Outstanding Achievement In Content For Non-Traditional Delivery Platforms =

The Sports Emmy Award for Outstanding Achievement In Content For Non-Traditional Delivery Platforms was first given away in 2006 to Animax Entertainment and ESPN.com. For the 2006 awards, the category will change into Outstanding Broadband, and will be broken into three subcategories — Coverage, Long Form, and General Interest.

== List of winners ==
- 2005: Off Mikes Webcast on ESPN.com (ESPN.com/Animax Entertainment)
  - Baseball's Best Moments Webcast on MLB.com (MLB.com)
  - E - Ticket: The Wizard at 95 Webcast on ESPN.com (ESPN.com)
  - The Sports Guy Webcast on ESPN.com (ESPN.com/Funny Garbage Productions)
