= John E. Thomas =

Canadian philosopher

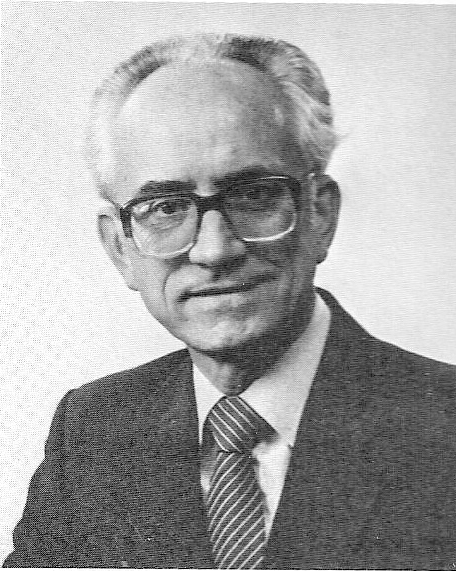
- Born: John Edward Thomas; 9 April 1926; Merthyr Tydfil, Wales
- Died: 14 October 1996 (aged 70)
- Spouse: Moreen Duff Muir (m. 1947)
- Children: Dave Thomas; Ian Thomas

Academic background
- Education: McMaster University (B.A., B.D.); Duke University (M.A., Ph.D.)

Academic work
- Discipline: Philosopher; Medical ethicist
- Institutions: McMaster University

John Edward Thomas (9 April 1926 – 14 October 1996) was a British-born Canadian philosopher and pioneer of medical ethics in Canada.

== Biography ==
=== Early life and education ===
Born in Merthyr Tydfil, Wales in 1926, John Thomas moved to Birmingham, England with his parents, David Llewlyn Thomas and Ann Olwyn Thomas, where he worked for two years at the Birmingham Small Arms. Thomas moved to Scotland to enter the Bible Training Institute in Glasgow, and there met Moreen Duff Muir (4 May 1928 - 18 May 2022), daughter of William C. Muir a noted herbalist and Jeanne Duff. Thomas married Muir in 1947 and they left the United Kingdom for Canada, where they settled in St. Catharines, Ontario.

In 1949, their first child, David William Thomas was born. John Thomas completed entered high school in St. Catharines, completed his grade 13 curriculum and then enrolled at McMaster University in Hamilton, Ontario, Canada in a Bachelor of Arts program. The Thomas family moved to Toronto in 1950 where John Thomas took the pastorship of Ebenezer Baptist Church on Burnhamthorpe Road, in Etobicoke, Ontario.

Their second child Ian Campbell Thomas was born in 1950. Thomas was the pastor at Ebenezer while he completed his Bachelor of Arts and Bachelor of Divinity degrees at McMaster University.

In 1954, the Thomas family migrated to the United States, where John Thomas won a scholarship at Duke University in Durham, North Carolina in the masters program in philosophy. John Thomas completed the masters and doctorate programs (PhD) at Duke University in 1960. In 1960, the Thomas family returned to Hamilton, Ontario where John Thomas accepted an assistant professorship at the Department of Philosophy at McMaster University. Thomas lectured at McMaster until his retirement in 1993.

=== Lecturing and other work ===
From 1960 to 1991 Thomas was faculty in the Department of Philosophy at McMaster University. His second-year philosophy (2D3) 3 credit course, Medical Ethics and Human Life, was very successful with thousands having taken the class. Topics included abortion, euthanasia, consent and medical experimentation. Philosophical paradigms included J.S. Mill's utilitarianism, Kant's universalizability, W.D. Ross's ranking system of prima-facie duties. He was also Adjunct Professor of Medicine at McMaster University's Faculty of Health Sciences. He was a columnist for The Canadian Doctor from 1986 to 1988, and a columnist for Canadian Family Physician from 1991 to 1996.

== Works ==
- Russell in Review (Publisher: Hakkert & Company Toronto 1976)
- Matters of life and Death (Publisher: Samuel Stevens, Toronto 1978)
- Musings on the Meno (Publisher: Martinus Nijhoff 1980)
- Well and Good (Publisher: Broadview Press 1987).
