= Kidz in the Wood =

- Title card
- Genre: Comedy; Family
- Written by: Neal Israel; Robert Klane
- Directed by: Neal Israel
- Starring: Dave Thomas; Julia Duffy; Tatyana Ali; Candace Cameron; David Lascher; Darius McCrary; Alfonso Ribeiro
- Music by: Richard Bellis
- Country of origin: United States
- Original language: English

Production
- Executive producers: Allen S. Epstein; Jim Green; Neal Israel; Robert Klane
- Producers: Mark Bacino; Tom Rowe
- Production location: Vancouver
- Cinematography: David Geddes
- Editor: Tom Walls
- Running time: 95 minutes
- Production company: Green/Epstein Productions

Original release
- Network: NBC
- Release: May 25, 1996

Kidz in the Wood is a 1996 American television film starring Dave Thomas and Julia Duffy. The film premiered on NBC on May 25, 1996.

== Plot ==
A high school history teacher takes a group of students with academic and behavioral issues on a two-week trip recreating the Oregon Trail in attempt to help them graduate. The film follows the students and teachers as they grapple with personality issues and forces of nature.

== Cast ==
- Dave Thomas as Tom Foster
- Julia Duffy as Felicia Duffy
- Candace Cameron as Donna
- Alfonso Ribeiro as Morgan
- Tatyana Ali as Rita
- David Lascher as Sloan
- Darius McCrary as Tootooe
- Byron Chief-Moon as Brandon Three Tongues
- Samuel Vincent as Marvin / Dr. Doom
- Andy Berman as Barry
- Ryan Brown as Larry
- Don S. Davis as Principal Dunbar
- Garry Chalk as Coach
