= Brother Bear 2 =

2006 animated Disney film by Ben Gluck

- DVD cover
- Directed by: Ben Gluck
- Written by: Rich Burns
- Produced by: Carolyn Bates; Jim Ballantine
- Starring: Patrick Dempsey; Mandy Moore; Benjamin Bryan; Jim Cummings; Michael Clarke Duncan; Jessie Flower; Wendie Malick; Andrea Martin; Rick Moranis; Kathy Najimy; Catherine O'Hara; Jeremy Suarez; Krista Swan; Wanda Sykes; Dave Thomas; Jack Weber; Dana Gonzales
- Music by: Matthew Gerrard; David Metzger; Robbie Nevil
- Production company: Disneytoon Studios
- Distributed by: Walt Disney Home Entertainment (Note: Released through the Walt Disney Pictures banner.)
- Release date: August 29, 2006
- Running time: 73 minutes
- Country: United States
- Language: English

Brother Bear 2 is a 2006 American animated direct-to-video musical fantasy comedy-drama adventure film and the sequel to Disney Animation's 2003 film Brother Bear. Melissa Etheridge contributed three songs to the film. In the film, the adventures of bear brothers Kenai and Koda continue. While the first film dealt with Kenai's relationship with Koda, this one focuses more on his bond with a young human from his past, Nita. It was released on August 29, 2006.

Jeremy Suarez, Rick Moranis, Dave Thomas, and Michael Clarke Duncan reprised their roles, with Patrick Dempsey replacing Joaquin Phoenix as Kenai. As heard in the first trailer, Jason Marsden was initially cast as Kenai before being replaced by Dempsey. The end credits still note Marsden as one of the additional voices. Jason Raize, the voice of Denahi in the first film, had died in 2004, and his character therefore does not appear in the film.

== Plot ==
Several months after the events of the first film, Kenai, now a bear, is living happily with his foster brother Koda. Having just awoken from hibernation, the bears begin traveling to Crowberry Ridge for the first berries of the season. However, Kenai is plagued by visions of his childhood friend Nita, to whom he gave a special amulet many years ago after saving her from drowning. Nita, now grown up, is set to wed Atka, a man from a neighboring Inuit village. However, on the day of the wedding, the Spirits appear in the form of a storm that causes a fissure to open up in the ground between Nita and Atka, much to Nita's shock. Believing it to be a sign, Nita consults Innoko, the wisest shaman of the tribes. By communicating with the Spirits, Innoko reveals that the amulet that Kenai gave Nita all those years ago bonded her and Kenai together. The only way for Nita to sever the bond and be able to marry Atka is to find Kenai, go with him to Hokani Falls where he had given her the amulet, and burn it on the eve of the Equinox, thus returning the bond to the Spirits. Innoko grants Nita the ability to communicate with Kenai and other wildlife.

Eventually, Kenai and Koda meet up with Nita. At first, Kenai refuses to destroy the bond, but Nita tells him that the Spirits may turn him back into a human and send him to find her. Under pressure from Nita and Koda, who fears that he and Kenai could no longer be brothers if this happens, Kenai relents and the three make their way to Hokani Falls. As they spend more time together, Kenai and Nita rekindle their old friendship, much to Koda's chagrin. The three also run into Rutt and Tuke multiple times throughout their journey, and Nita helps them impress a pair of female Canadian moose. One night, Nita asks Kenai if he ever thought of being human again. When Kenai says that he has considered it, Koda hears this and races up a mountain, anxious that Kenai may leave him. Nita finds Koda hiding in a cave, but both are caught in an avalanche and are rescued by Kenai. Kenai castigates Koda for almost getting himself killed, but the two reconcile with Kenai assuring Koda that he will never leave him.

The trio eventually make it to Hokani Falls, where they burn the amulet. Without it, Nita can no longer communicate with Kenai or Koda, so she says goodbye. Seeing how miserable Kenai is and realizing that he loves Nita, Koda secretly asks his mother in the spirit world to turn Kenai back into a human so he can be happy. The next morning, Rutt and Tuke inform Kenai that Koda went to the village to retrieve Nita. Knowing that Koda will be killed, Kenai goes after him.

At the village, the tribes prepare for the wedding once again, but Nita, realizing her love for Kenai, tells her father Chilkoot that she cannot marry Atka. At that moment, Koda creates a major commotion in the village in order to get Nita's attention, while Kenai arrives to retrieve Koda. Rutt and Tuke rescue Koda from two of the villagers, while Atka fights with Kenai, throwing him off of a cliff and into shallow water. Nita breaks up with Atka, pushes him and tells him that Kenai was her best friend before she rushes to Kenai's side, where the two profess their love for each other. The Spirits arrive to change Kenai back into a human, allowing Nita to communicate with Kenai and Koda. Kenai tells Nita that he cannot become a human again and leave Koda, but Nita volunteers to have herself turned into a bear instead so she can be with him. With her father's blessing, the Spirits transform Nita into a bear. Kenai and Nita then get married, with the tribes, bears, Koda, Rutt, Tuke and their mates attending.

== Voice cast ==
- Patrick Dempsey as Kenai
- Jack Weber as Young Kenai
- Jeremy Suarez as Koda
- Mandy Moore as Nita
- Michaela Jill Murphy as Young Nita
- Rick Moranis as Rutt
- Dave Thomas as Tuke
- Michael Clarke Duncan as Tug
- Andrea Martin as Anda
- Jeff Bennett as Atka
- Catherine O'Hara as Kata
- Wanda Sykes as Innoko
- Wendie Malick as Siqiniq
- Kathy Najimy as Taqqiq
- Tress MacNeille as Hoonah
- Jim Cummings as Bering and Chilkoot

== Production ==
The film was produced by Disneytoon Studios, Disney Animation Australia and Project Firefly, a start up animation company founded by former Disney Feature Animation Florida employees.

Producer Jim Ballantine was removed from the project and replaced with Carolyn Bates.

Brother Bear 2 was produced on an accelerated schedule of approximately 11 months, during the final period of operations at DisneyToon Studios Australia. The production coincided with Disney’s 2005 announcement that its Sydney animation facility would close in 2006. The film was among the studio’s final animated features.

== Reception ==
On the review aggregator website Rotten Tomatoes, 50% of 8 critics' reviews are positive, with an average rating of 5.6/10.

Enthusiastic reviews included Kevin Carr of 7M Pictures, who wrote, "The kids will love Brother Bear 2, especially if they loved the first film. It has a good message and some decent scenes." ReelTalk Movie Reviews said, "Although sequels -- even a few from Disney -- are often disappointing, this one is a keeper, mostly because of its charming story and extraordinary background music". DVDTalk's Brian Orndorf said, "As money-grabbing animated product goes, Brother Bear 2 rests nicely on a lowered expectation level, and is hardly an offensive affront to the first film. The texture and polish is deeply missed, but the characters are so strong and engaging, it still entertains." David Cornelius, also of DVDTalk, wrote, "The story fails to impress, but everything else adds up in all the right ways to make up for it. The makers of Brother Bear 2 break the curse of the Disney sequel and turn in a welcome effort." Movie Metropolis said, "When you consider that Disney meant this production strictly for the home and it probably didn't cost nearly as much as the first film to make or market, it's actually a superior product...Brother Bear 2 may not be first-tier Disney filmmaking, but it is first-tier Disney animation, and that and the sweetness of the story line may be enough to keep even grown-ups entertained."

Negative reviews opined the film's use of cliches and said the plot was subpar in comparison to its predecessor. David Nusair of Reel Film Reviews said, "There's little doubt that Brother Bear 2, for the most part, comes off as an affable yet entirely needless piece of work, as filmmaker Ben Gluck, working from Rich Burns' script, is generally unable to wholeheartedly capture and sustain the viewer's interest - with the ongoing emphasis on stand-alone segments (e.g. the central trio run afoul of several violent raccoons) ensuring that the movie is only sporadically engaging."

== Home media ==
The film was released on direct-to-DVD and direct-to-VHS on August 29, 2006.

== Soundtrack ==
Brother Bear 2

Soundtrack album by Various artists
- Released: August 15, 2006
- Genres: Pop, rock, soundtrack
- Label: Walt Disney Records

The soundtrack to Brother Bear 2 was released on August 15, 2006.

All tracks are written by Melissa Etheridge.

No.	Title	Performer(s)	Length
1.	"Opening: Brother Bear 2"		0:34
2.	"Welcome to This Day"	Melissa Etheridge	2:40
3.	"The Dream"		2:08
4.	"Father and Daughter"		0:54
5.	"Nita Confesses Her Fear"		0:55
6.	"Feels Like Home"	Melissa Etheridge & Josh Kelley	3:30
7.	"It Will Be Me"	Melissa Etheridge	3:35
8.	"Koda's Wish to the Spirits"		1:38
9.	"I Love You Too"		2:42
10.	"Nita's Transformation"		1:23
11.	"Welcome to This Day (Reprise)"	Melissa Etheridge & Josh Kelley	1:33
