= Julia Duffy =

American actress

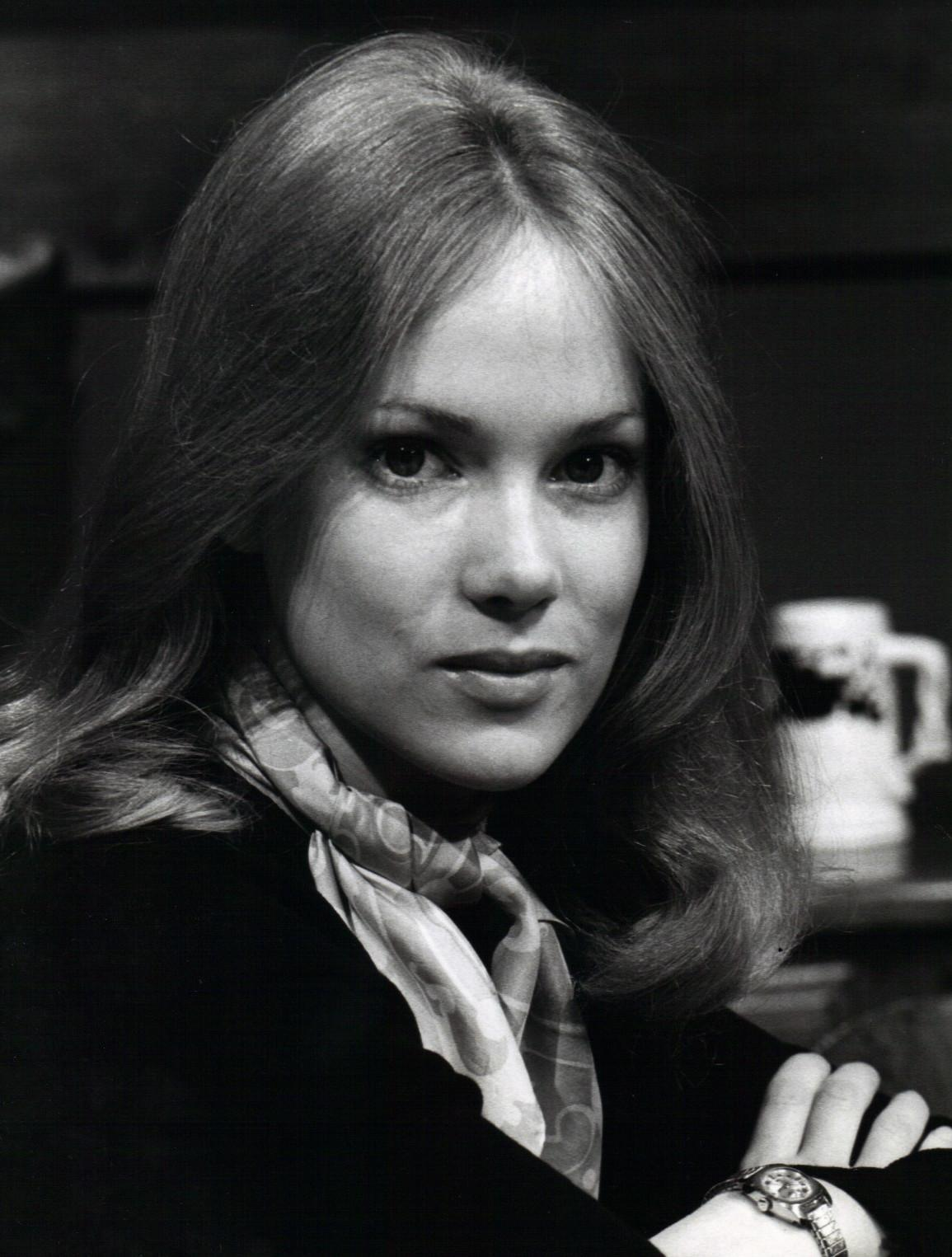
- Duffy on The Doctors in 1975
- Born: Julia Margaret Hinds; Minneapolis, Minnesota, U.S.
- Education: American Academy of Dramatic Arts
- Occupations: Actress; author
- Years active: 1972–present
- Known for: Newhart; Baby Talk; Designing Women; Drake & Josh
- Spouse: Jerry Lacy (m. 1984)
- Children: 2

Julia Margaret Duffy (née Hinds) is an American actress. From 1983 to 1990, she played Stephanie Vanderkellen in the TV series Newhart. The role garnered her critical acclaim, including seven Primetime Emmy Award nominations, three Viewers for Quality Television awards, and a Golden Globe Award nomination for Best Supporting Actress – Series, Miniseries or Television Film.

Following the conclusion of Newhart, Duffy continued to work in television, playing the original Maggie Campbell on Baby Talk (1991) and Allison Sugarbaker on Designing Women (1991–1992). In the 2000s, Duffy appeared in guest roles on Reba and Drake & Josh, as well as having supporting roles in 2003's comedy films Dumb and Dumberer: When Harry Met Lloyd and Intolerable Cruelty. She had recurring guest roles on the series Shameless (2011–2013) and Looking (2014–2015), and appeared in a supporting role in the drama Camp X-Ray (2014). She portrayed Mary Hart in The Blue and the Gray television miniseries.

== Early life, family, and education ==
Duffy was born in Minneapolis, Minnesota, the youngest of four daughters of Joseph Hinds and Mary Duffy. When Julia was seven years old, her father died, and her mother later remarried and worked as a real estate agent.

She began acting as an adolescent, appearing in local stage productions at Minneapolis's Old Log Theatre. At age 18, she appeared in a Minneapolis production of The Girl in the Freudian Slip. In 1970, Duffy moved to New York City, and she enrolled at the American Academy of Dramatic Arts, from which she graduated in 1972. While attending, she worked as a waitress and hatcheck girl.

== Career ==
=== Career beginnings ===
Duffy began her career in television, appearing in minor guest roles in soap operas such as Love of Life and One Life to Live before being cast in the role of Penny Davis in the series The Doctors from 1973 until 1977. In 1978, Duffy starred in the critically acclaimed Broadway revival of Once in a Lifetime.

She appeared in supporting roles in the exploitation horror film Butcher, Baker, Nightmare Maker (1981), also known as Night Warning, as well as Cutter's Way (1981). She appeared in a first season episode of the television sitcom Cheers in 1982. Initially, she had been considered for the role of Diane Chambers, the sitcom's female lead.

In 1983, she played Princess Ariel Baaldorf in the medieval adventure spoof TV series Wizards and Warriors, which lasted one season on the CBS network.

=== Newhart and critical acclaim ===
In 1982, Duffy guest-starred on the sitcom Newhart as Stephanie Vanderkellen, a self-obsessed heiress and the haughty cousin of Stratford Inn maid Leslie. At the beginning of the second season, Duffy joined the main cast, replacing Leslie as the Stratford's maid. She continued to play Stephanie for the rest of the show's run, earning Emmy Award nominations for Outstanding Supporting Actress in a Comedy Series for the role every year from 1984 through 1990. She also received a Golden Globe nomination and won three Viewers For Quality Television awards and five American Comedy Awards nominations for her work.

Twice during Newhart's run, Duffy was pregnant. The first time, she wore baggy clothes and stood behind furniture to hide her bump, while the second time, the pregnancy was written into the show, with Stephanie becoming a mother in the eighth season. As of 2023, she remained in touch with Bob Newhart; he died in 2024.

=== After Newhart ===
After Newhart ended in 1990, Duffy briefly starred in the sitcom Baby Talk alongside George Clooney, but asked to be released after Clooney walked off the troubled set. The new producers accommodated her, allowing her to then join the cast of Designing Women in 1991. Baby Talk was then retooled and Duffy was replaced by Mary Page Keller. On Designing Women, she essentially replaced Delta Burke, the show's breakout star, who was fired after quarrels with producers. Duffy played Allison Sugarbaker, Burke and Dixie Carter's previously unseen cousin on the show. Duffy's tenure on the sitcom's sixth season turned out to be the highest-rated season in the show's history, partly because of the highly publicized cast additions of Duffy and Jan Hooks. However, because of conflicting ideas about her character, she was amicably released from her contract, thus leading her to be replaced by Judith Ivey.

From 1993 to 1995, Duffy played Barb Ballantine on the short-lived comedy series The Mommies. Duffy played Lindsay Mercer, one of the failed buyers of Winfred-Lauder and the ex-wife of Lord Mercer on The Drew Carey Show. She has a recurring role on the Nickelodeon series Drake & Josh as Linda Hayfer, a high-school English teacher who despises Drake. She appeared on The Suite Life of Zack & Cody as the rich mother of Jason, a boy who goes on a date with Maddie Fitzpatrick (Ashley Tisdale). She made a brief appearance in the Nickelodeon sitcom True Jackson, VP as the owner of a stage that LuLu (Ashley Argota) wanted to rent.

In 2009, Duffy co-starred with Kelly McGillis in a stage production of The Little Foxes at the Pasadena Playhouse. She later appeared again at the Playhouse in The Heiress starring Richard Chamberlain. In the 2010s, Duffy had recurring roles on HBO's Looking and Showtime's Shameless, as well as Scream Queens, Key and Peele, and other guest roles. In 2014, she appeared in a supporting role opposite Kristen Stewart in the drama film Camp X-Ray.

Her theater credits include the Broadway production Once in a Lifetime as well as numerous regional theater credits. Most recently, Duffy appeared in a stage production of Guess Who's Coming to Dinner at the Huntington Theatre in Boston, directed by David Esbjornson, for which she received an IRNE Award nomination for Best Supporting Actress in a Drama, followed by a lead in the play Sex and Education at the Laguna Playhouse in the spring of 2016. In December 2016, Duffy co-starred with Mare Winningham and Mark Blum in an Off-Broadway production of Rancho Viejo directed by Daniel Aukin Playwrights Horizons. Ben Brantley of The New York Times described Duffy's performance as "hilariously withering." She starred in the ensemble comedy The Outsider at Paper Mill Playhouse in New Jersey, along with Broadway veterans Lenny Wolpe, Kelley Curran and Manoel Felciano, directed by David Esbjornson.

=== Other pursuits ===
Duffy wrote the book Bad Auditions, published by Smith and Kraus in 2018.

== Personal life ==
Duffy married actor Jerry Lacy, co-star of Dark Shadows and Love of Life, in 1984. In 1986, they had their first child, a daughter, Kerry. In August 1989, Duffy gave birth to their second child, a son, Daniel. Daniel died by suicide in April 2019.

== Filmography ==
=== Film ===
Year	Title	Role	Notes	Ref.
1980	Battle Beyond the Stars	Mol		
1981	Cutter's Way	Young Girl		
1982	Butcher, Baker, Nightmare Maker	Julia	Alternate title: Night Warning	
1982	Wacko	Mary Graves		
1984	Children in the Crossfire	Dee Malone	Television film	
1988	Maybe Baby	Casey	Television film	
1989	The Cover Girl and the Cop	Jackie Flanders	Television film Alternate title: Beauty and Denise	
1990	The Love Boat: A Valentine Voyage	Myrna Foley	Television film	
1990	Menu for Murder	Susan	Television film	
1996	Kidz in the Wood	Felicia Duffy	Television film	
2003	Charlotte's Web 2: Wilbur's Great Adventure	Charlotte A. Cavatica	Voice; replacing Debbie Reynolds; Direct-to-video	
2003	Dumb and Dumberer: When Harry Met Lloyd	Mrs. Matthews		
2003	Intolerable Cruelty	Sarah Batista O'Flanagan Sorkin		
2007	Be My Baby	Doris		
2008	Together Again for the First Time	Audrey Wolders Frobisher	Television film	
2008	7 Things to Do Before I'm 30	Vanessa Madisen	Television film	
2010	On Strike for Christmas	Erna	Television film	
2014	Camp X-Ray	Betty Cole		
2015	All She Wishes	Grace		
2019	Grand-Daddy Day Care	Bonnie		
2019	Fair Market Value	Isabel		
2019	Christmas at the Plaza	Amanda Clark	Television film	
2022	Christmas with the Campbells	Liz Campbell		

=== Television ===
Year(s)	Title	Role	Notes	Ref.
1972	Love of Life	Geri Braylee		
1973–1978	The Doctors	Penny Davis		
1977	One Life to Live	Karen Wolek	Episode: "#1.7659"	
1979	The Love Boat	Sandy	Episodes: "Alaska Wedding Cruise" (parts 1 & 2)	
1981	Lou Grant	Charlene	Episode: "Rape"	
1982	Cheers	Rebecca Prout	Episode: "Any Friend of Diane's"	
1982	Voyagers!	Nellie Bly	Episode: "Jack's Back"	
1982	The Blue and the Gray	Mary Hale	Miniseries	
1983	Simon & Simon	Jody Carmichael	Episode: "Room 3502"	
1983	Wizards and Warriors	Princess Ariel	8 episodes	
1983–1990	Newhart	Stephanie Vanderkellen	163 episodes	
1984	The Love Boat	Paula	Episode: "The Last Heist"	
1985	Hotel	Arlene Greenspan	Episode: "Hearts and Minds"	
1991	Baby Talk	Maggie Campbell	12 episodes	
1991–1992	Designing Women	Allison Sugarbaker	23 episodes	
1993–1995	The Mommies	Barb Ballantine	28 episodes	
1996	Pinky and the Brain	Delilah	Episode: "A Little Off the Top"	
1997	Social Studies	Frances Harman	6 episodes	
1997	Pepper Ann	Aunt Fanny (voice)	Episode: "Thanksgiving Dad"	
1998	Grace Under Fire	Bev	2 episodes	
1999	Sabrina, the Teenage Witch	Lucy Kraft	Episode: "Mrs. Kraft"	
1999	Diagnosis: Murder	Lorraine Kay	Episode: "The Roast"	
2001–2002	Reba	Mrs. Hodge	4 episodes	
2002	The Drew Carey Show	Lindsay Mercer	Episode: "Rich Woman, Poor Man"	
2004–2006	Drake & Josh	Mrs. Hayfer	4 episodes	
2005	CSI: NY	Millie Hanford	Episode: "Recycling"	
2005	The Suite Life of Zack & Cody	Martha Harrington	Episode: "Maddie Checks In"	
2006	7th Heaven	Mrs. Porter	Episode: "Got MLK?"	
2008	Wizards of Waverly Place	Mrs. Angela	Episode: "Credit Check"	
2008	Merry Christmas, Drake & Josh	Mrs. Hayfer	Television film	
2010	Melissa & Joey	Myrna Sherwood	Episode: "A Fright in the Attic"	
2011–2013	Shameless	Candace Lishman	4 episodes	
2012	The League	Martha MacArthur	Episode: "The Breastalyzer"	
2014	Anger Management	Phyllis	Episode: "Charlie Gets Date Rated"	
2014	Suburgatory	Emmaline	Episode: "The Ballad of Piggy Duckworth"	
2014	Key & Peele	Mom	Episode: "Terrorist Meeting"	
2014–2015	Looking	Dana Murray	2 episodes	
2015	Scream Queens	Bunny Radwell	Episode: "Thanksgiving"	
2016	Hitting the Breaks	Abigail Dochard	Episode: "Safe House"	
2017	Adoptable	Sarah Steinberg	2 episodes	
2017	American Housewife	Amanda Otto	Episode: "Family Secrets"	
2018	The Cool Kids	Francine	Episode: "Thanksgiving at Murray's"	
2021	Country Comfort	Abigail	Episode: "Sign, Sign, Everywhere a Sign"	
2021	Black Monday	Maxine Blackmore	Episode: "Four!"	
2024	Night Court	Susan	Recurring role	
2024	Palm Royale	Mary Jones Davidsoul	9 episodes	
2026	The 'Burbs	Lynn	Main role	

== Stage credits ==
Year	Title	Role	Notes	Ref.
1978	Once in a Lifetime	Susan Walker	Circle in the Square Theatre	
2009	The Little Foxes	Birdie Hubbard	Pasadena Playhouse	
2010	Boom	Barbara	Carrie Hamilton Theatre and Pasadena Playhouse	
2012	The Heiress	Aunt Lavinia	Pasadena Playhouse	
2014	Guess Who's Coming to Dinner	Christina Drayton	Huntington Theatre	
2016	Sex and Education	Miss Edwards	Laguna Playhouse	
2016	Rancho Viejo	Patti	Playwrights Horizons	

== Accolades ==
Award	Year	Category	Work	Result	Ref.
American Comedy Awards	1987	Funniest Leading Female in a Comedy Series	Newhart	Nominated	
Golden Globe Awards	1988	Best Supporting Actress – Series, Miniseries or Television Film	Newhart	Nominated	
IRNE Awards	2014	Best Supporting Actress	Guess Who's Coming to Dinner	Nominated	
Primetime Emmy Awards	1984	Outstanding Supporting Actress in a Comedy Series	Newhart	Nominated	
Primetime Emmy Awards	1985	Outstanding Supporting Actress in a Comedy Series	Newhart	Nominated	
Primetime Emmy Awards	1986	Outstanding Supporting Actress in a Comedy Series	Newhart	Nominated	
Primetime Emmy Awards	1987	Outstanding Supporting Actress in a Comedy Series	Newhart	Nominated	
Primetime Emmy Awards	1988	Outstanding Supporting Actress in a Comedy Series	Newhart	Nominated	
Primetime Emmy Awards	1989	Outstanding Supporting Actress in a Comedy Series	Newhart	Nominated	
Primetime Emmy Awards	1990	Outstanding Supporting Actress in a Comedy Series	Newhart	Nominated	
Viewers for Quality Television	1986	Best Supporting Actress — Comedy Series	Newhart	Won	
Viewers for Quality Television	1987	Best Supporting Actress — Comedy Series	Newhart	Won	
Viewers for Quality Television	1988	Best Supporting Actress — Comedy Series	Newhart	Won	
