= Dave Thomas (actor) =

Canadian actor and comedian (born 1949)

Dave Thomas CM
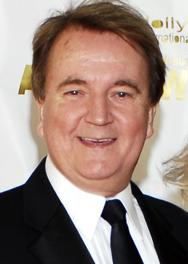
- Thomas in 2007
- Born: David William Thomas; May 20, 1949 (age 77); St. Catharines, Ontario, Canada
- Education: McMaster University (BA)
- Occupations: Actor; comedian; television writer
- Years active: 1974–present
- Spouses: Pam Thomas (divorced); Kimberly Ann (m. 1994)
- Children: 4
- Father: John E. Thomas
- Relatives: Ian Thomas (brother)

David William Thomas CM (born May 20, 1949) is a Canadian actor, comedian and television writer, known for being one half of the duo Bob and Doug McKenzie with Rick Moranis. He appeared as Doug McKenzie on SCTV, for which he won a Primetime Emmy Award out of two nominations, and in the film Strange Brew (1983), which he also co-directed. As a duo, they made two albums, The Great White North and Strange Brew, the former gaining them a Grammy Award nomination and a Juno Award.

His other notable acting credits include My Man Adam (1985), The Experts (1989), Coneheads (1993), Rat Race (2001), Beethoven's 5th (2003) and Santa's Slay (2005). He is also known for playing Russell Norton in the TV series Grace Under Fire (1993–1998) and provided the voice of Tuke in Brother Bear (2003), and Brother Bear 2 (2006).

== Early life ==
David William Thomas was born May 20, 1949, in St. Catharines, Ontario. He is the eldest son of British parents, Moreen Duff Muir (1928–2022), a church organist for thirty years originally from Glasgow, Scotland, and composer of church music, and John E. Thomas (1926–1996), a medical ethicist from Merthyr Tydfil, Wales, who was head of the Philosophy Department at McMaster University, and the author of several books. Dave's younger brother, Ian Thomas, is a Canadian singer-songwriter.

The family moved temporarily to Durham, North Carolina, where his father attended Duke University and earned a PhD in philosophy. The family moved back to Dundas, Ontario, in 1961, where Dave attended Dundas District high school, and later graduated with honors from McMaster University in Hamilton, Ontario, earning a Bachelor of Arts Degree in English literature.

== Career ==
Starting his career as a copywriter at ad agency McCann Erickson in 1974, Thomas became the head writer of the Coca-Cola account in Canada within a year. After watching a Second City stage show in Toronto, and while suffering from self-described "boredom" in his advertising work, he auditioned for the Second City troupe and was chosen as a performer. He was a cast member of the Toronto production of Godspell, along with Victor Garber, Martin Short, Eugene Levy, Gilda Radner, and Andrea Martin. Paul Shaffer was the musical director.

He first achieved fame as a cast member of the Canadian TV comedy series SCTV, joining Godspell castmates Levy, Martin and later Short, plus Rick Moranis, John Candy, Harold Ramis, Catherine O'Hara and others. Notable characters on the show include Doug McKenzie of beer-swilling brothers Bob and Doug McKenzie, editorialist Bill Needle, Scottish scone-chef/bluesman Angus Crock, motor-mouthed TV ad announcer Harvey K-Tel, Lowery organist/curio pitchman Tex Boil and the "Cruising Gourmet".

Thomas recalled in a 2026 interview with The New York Times that the original concept for SCTV was developed during a meeting at The Second City's Old Fire Hall in Toronto. According to Thomas, Second City director Del Close suggested setting the series at a fictional television station, allowing the cast to create television programming, commercials, film parodies and recurring characters within a shared fictional setting. Thomas credited the show's creative chemistry to the longstanding relationships among its performers, several of whom had worked together before joining Second City.

He said that the cast initially had little indication that SCTV was attracting an audience, allowing them considerable creative freedom. He recalled first becoming aware of the show's popularity during its third season, when he and Rick Moranis travelled to Winnipeg in character as Bob and Doug McKenzie for a promotional appearance involving the Winnipeg Blue Bombers cheerleaders and were greeted at the airport by approximately 1,000 fans. He identified the show's elaborate parodies of Fantasy Island, The Godfather and Soviet television as among his favourite productions.

Thomas's first film role was in Home to Stay, directed by Delbert Mann, in which Thomas played in a scene with Hollywood legend Henry Fonda. He then wrote, co-directed, and starred in the Bob & Doug McKenzie feature film Strange Brew. Soon after, he wrote for and acted in The New Show, produced by Lorne Michaels during his hiatus from Saturday Night Live. Short-lived, this show featured a powerhouse writing staff including Thomas along with Buck Henry, George Meyer, Jack Handey, Al Franken, Tom Davis, Valri Bromfield and Steve Martin. Thomas tried his hand at network television hour-long shows in 1986 when he wrote and co-executive produced Steel Collar Man for CBS. The pilot was produced but did not go to series.

He co-wrote Spies Like Us (1985) with Dan Aykroyd.

In 1988, Thomas wrote another hour long show for CBS, B Men, which was back ordered, but Thomas took a directing job at Paramount, which caused the network to drop the series. He reportedly introduced John Travolta and Kelly Preston while directing them in the Paramount film The Experts.

He wrote for, produced, and starred in The Dave Thomas Comedy Show (1990). In 1991, he starred in the Showtime comedy, Public Enemy #2. In 1992, he tried his hand at reality TV and co-executive produced ABC's America's Funniest People with Vin Di Bona, but left after thirteen weeks to appear in the film Coneheads.

In 1993, he co-starred in ABC's Grace Under Fire with Brett Butler and Tom Poston and continued with the show for 5 seasons. In 1995, Thomas starred in the ABC television film Picture Perfect with Mary Page Keller and Richard Karn. In 1995, Thomas produced a pilot of a game show called Family Challenge for ABC. When ABC did not pick up the series, Thomas sold Family Challenge to the Family Channel, where he produced 144 episodes of the show spread over 2 seasons. In 1996, Thomas played the title role in the Fox television film Mr. Foster's Field Trip aka Kidz in the Wood with Julia Duffy.

In 1996, he wrote the book SCTV: Behind the Scenes (McClelland & Stewart, publishers). From 1999 to 2002, he voiced various roles on the animated series Mission Hill.

Thomas co-starred in the Paramount feature Rat Race. As of 2001, Thomas has been the Executive Creative Director of Animax Entertainment, an animation studio based officially in Culver City, California. In 2001 and 2002, Thomas appeared with Eugene Levy and Martin Short on Short's show Primetime Glick as Bob Hope (an impression he had first developed for SCTV with great success). In 2002, he co-starred with Jason Priestley, Dave Foley, and Ewen Bremner in Fancy Dancing. The next year he played a lead role in Beethoven's 5th. In 2003, he directed a hospital comedy feature film entitled Whitecoats, which he also wrote. As of 2004, Thomas was on the official Advisory Committee for the Comedy program at Humber College, the only such diploma program in the world. In 2004, he and Moranis again worked together voicing Rutt and Tuke, two moose based on the McKenzie Brothers, in Disney's animated feature Brother Bear.

Thomas has had a long career doing voices for animation including Animaniacs, Duckman, CatDog, The Adventures of Tarzan, Justice League and multiple roles on The Simpsons, King of the Hill and Family Guy. In 2005, he had a guest stint as Charlize Theron's "Uncle Trevor" on Fox's Arrested Development. In 2006, he reprised his voice role in Brother Bear 2 and appeared as himself in the feature film The Aristocrats. He began production on ArnoldSpeaks.com, a video blog, as the voice of Arnold Schwarzenegger; Animax Entertainment won an Emmy for a broadband animated series produced for ESPN, Off Mikes.

In 2007, Thomas and Rick Moranis reprised their roles as Bob and Doug McKenzie in a one-hour special, Bob & Doug McKenzie's Two-Four Anniversary, for CBC Television. The show featured cameos from McKenzie celeb fans like Ben Stiller, Dave Foley, Tom Green, Paul Shaffer, Andy Dick, Matt Groening, Barry Pepper, Martin Short, and Geddy Lee. Former Prime Minister of Canada Paul Martin was the host. In 2008, Thomas revived Bob and Doug McKenzie in a new animated series, Bob & Doug. While Thomas reprises the character of Doug in the new series, Moranis chose not to voice the character of Bob, which instead is voiced by Dave Coulier. Moranis is, however, involved in the series as an executive producer.

In November 2009, Thomas received an Honorary Doctor of Letters from his alma mater McMaster University and gave the fall convocation speech. In 2010, Animax continued to produce branded entertainment, advertising and digital shorts for corporations like Disney, Warner Brothers, NBC Universal, and Kodak. In 2011, Thomas's company Animax produced another animated show for MTV entitled Big Box along with numerous Internet shorts such as Life With Dad.

In 2012 and 2013, Thomas guest -starred in the dramatic shows Perception and Bones as well as comedy shows Comedy Bang! Bang! and How I Met Your Mother. In addition, in 2013, Thomas voiced the recurring role of Jeff Foxworthy's father Jesco in the CMT show Bounty Hunters.

Thomas joined the writing staff of the Fox crime drama television series Bones beginning in 2013. Thomas worked for two seasons on Bones, writing several episodes and working on staff as consulting producer for two seasons.

In 2015, Thomas joined the writing staff of NBC's The Blacklist as a consulting producer.

In 2020, life-sized statues of Thomas and Rick Moranis as their characters Bob and Doug McKenzie were put in place at the ICE District Sports Arena in Edmonton, Alberta.

Also in 2020, the Governor-General of Canada announced that Thomas was being appointed to the Order of Canada, Canada's highest civilian award.

In 2021, Thomas and Max Allan Collins teamed to write a sci-fi mystery novel, The Many Lives of Jimmy Leighton.

In 2026, Thomas was living in Thailand and working on several new projects, including an immersive video production for a dome theatre in Dunhuang, China.

== Awards ==
- ACTRA AWARD for Best Variety Performer in 1978.
- Emmy Award in 1981 for Outstanding Writing in a Variety or Music Program.
- Juno Award for Best Canadian Comedy Album of the Year in 1981.
- Grammy Award for Best Comedy Album Nominated in 1983
- Juno Award in 1983–84 for Best Comedy Album of the Year.
- People's Choice Award with the cast of Grace Under Fire in 1994.
- Earl Grey Award in 1995 for his work on SCTV.
- In 2002, he and the cast of the SCTV received a star on Canada's Walk of Fame.
- Emmy Award in 2006 – Outstanding Achievement in Content for Non-Traditional Delivery Platforms – Thomas and his company Animax won this award for ESPN's Off Mikes
- Lifetime Achievement Award from Humber College Toronto in November 2009.
- Honorary Doctor of Letters from McMaster University in 2009
- AMPIA Special Achievement Award from Alberta Media Production Industries Association in 2013
- Honoured at the 2013 AMPIA Awards for his contribution to film and television.
- In 2020, Dave Thomas was appointed as a member of the Order of Canada.
- In 2020, life-sized statues of Thomas and Rick Moranis as their characters Bob and Doug McKenzie were put in place at the ICE District Sports Arena in Edmonton, Alberta.

== Filmography ==
=== Television ===
Year	Title	Role	Notes
1976, 1977	King of Kensington	Rev. Penner, Harold	2 Episodes
1976–1982	Second City Television	Doug McKenzie, various characters	Main cast
1978	Home to Stay Television MOW	Petrie	Television film
1979	Riel	Militia Captain	Television film
1984	The Get Along Gang	Leland Lizard (voice)	Episode: "Pilot"
1990	The Dave Thomas Comedy Show	Himself	5 episodes; also writer, producer, and director
1991	Parker Lewis Can't Lose	Lionel Tower	Episode: "Tower of Power"
1992	Boris and Natasha: The Movie	Boris Badenov	Television film
1993	Animaniacs	King Arthur (voice)	Episode: "Sir Yaksalot"
1993–1998	Grace Under Fire	Russell Norton	Main cast
1994	The Larry Sanders Show	Himself	Episode: "Headwriter"
1994–1996	The Red Green Show	Ben Franklin	3 episodes
1995	Picture Perfect	Ernie Barrett	Television film
1996	Duckman	Tad Venom (voice)	Episode: "The Longest Weekend"
1996	Kidz in the Wood	Tom Foster	Television film
1997	Nightmare Ned	Pig Dad (voice)	Episode: "Canadian Bacon"
1997, 2006	The Simpsons	Rex Banner, Bob Hope (voice)	2 episodes
1998	CatDog	Mailman, Mean Bob (voice)	2 episodes
1999–2005	King of the Hill	Lane Prately, various voices	9 episodes
1999	Cosby	Tully	Episode: "Timerity"
1999	Mission Hill	Mr. Czelanski, Dr. Eulmeyer	3 episodes
2000	Caitlin's Way	Frank	2 episodes
2001	That '70s Show	Chris	Episode: "Canadian Road Trip"
2001	Space Ghost Coast to Coast	Himself	Episode: "The Justice Hole"
2001	The Legend of Tarzan	Hugo (voice)	7 episodes
2002	Justice League	Harv Hickman, Ernst (voice)	2 episodes
2002	Teamo Supremo	Trapster (voice)	Episode: "You Better Start Calling Me Chief!"
2002	New Beachcombers	Dave McGonigal	Television film
2005	Arrested Development	Trevor	5 episodes
2006	Weeds	Dr. Bertner	Episode: "Must Find Toes"
2007	Bob & Doug McKenzie's Two-Four Anniversary	Doug McKenzie	Television film; documentary
2009–2011	Bob & Doug	Doug McKenzie	Main cast (9 episodes); also creator and producer
2009	Popzilla	Various voices	Also producer and writer
2011–2012	Pound Puppies	Agent Todd (voice)	2 episodes
2012	Perception	Bill Duffy	Episode: "Shadow"
2012–2015	Comedy Bang! Bang!	Burt Aukerman	4 episodes
2013, 2017	Bones	Andrew Jursic, Dick Scarn	2 episodes; also producer and writer
2013	How I Met Your Mother	Chuck Gerussi	Episode: "P.S. I Love You"
2013	Bounty Hunters	Jesco	5 episodes
2015–2016	The Blacklist	N/A	Producer and writer (23 episodes)
2019–2020	Fast & Furious Spy Racers	Cleve Kelso (voice)	7 episodes

=== Film ===
Year	Title	Role	Notes
1980	Deadly Companion	Howie	
1981	Stripes	M.C.	
1983	Strange Brew	Doug McKenzie	Also director
1985	Sesame Street Presents: Follow That Bird	Sam Sleaze	
1986	My Man Adam	Jerry Swit	
1987	In the Mood	Bob Hope (voice)	Uncredited
1987	Love at Stake	Mayor Upton	
1988	Moving	Gary Marcus	
1989	Rocket Boy	Rocket Boy	Television film
1989	The Experts	N/A	Director
1993	Cold Sweat	Larry	
1993	Coneheads	Highmaster	
1993	Ghost Mom	N/A	Director
1997	Pippi Longstocking	Thunder-Karlsson (voice)	
2000	MVP: Most Valuable Primate	Willy Drucker	
2001	Rat Race	Harold Grisham	
2002	Fancy Dancing	Billy Gemmill	
2002	Who's Your Daddy?	Carl Hughes	
2003	Brother Bear	Tuke (voice)	
2003	Beethoven's 5th	Fred Kablinski	
2004	Intern Academy	Omar Olson	Also director and writer
2004	Love on the Side	Red	
2005	Santa's Slay	Pastor Timmons	
2005	The Aristocrats	Himself	Documentary
2006	Brother Bear 2	Tuke (voice)	
2025	John Candy: I Like Me	Himself	Documentary
2026	SCTV: The Greatest Show You’ve Never Heard Of	Himself	Documentary

=== Video games ===
Year	Title	Role	Notes
2007	The Tuttles: Madcap Misadventures	The Australian	

== Awards and nominations ==
Year	Association	Category	Work	Result
1981	Primetime Emmy Awards	Outstanding Writing in a Variety or Music Program	SCTV (shared with other writers)	Won
1982	Primetime Emmy Awards	Outstanding Writing in a Variety or Music Program	SCTV (shared with other writers)	Nominated
1983	Grammy Awards	Best Comedy Album	The Great White North – Bob and Doug McKenzie	Nominated
1983–84	Juno Awards	Juno Award for Comedy Album of the Year	The Great White North – Bob and Doug McKenzie	Won
1994	People's Choice Awards	Favorite New TV Comedy	Grace Under Fire	Won
1995	Gemini Awards	Earle Grey Award for Best Cast	SCTV	Won
2005	27th Sports Emmy Awards	Outstanding Achievement In Content For Non-Traditional Delivery Platforms	Off Mikes – Writer for Animax	Won
