= SCTV: The Greatest Show You've Never Heard Of =

2026 documentary film

- Film poster
- Directed by: Jason Hehir
- Produced by: Chapman Downes; Andrew Hafnor; Whitney Johnson; Kelly Meinhardt; Molly Montgomery
- Cinematography: Thomas McCallum
- Edited by: Brad Buckwalter; Barry Poltermann
- Music by: Tom Caffey
- Production companies: Kimmelot; Little Room Pictures
- Distributed by: Netflix
- Release date: October 30, 2026
- Running time: 88 minutes
- Country: United States
- Language: English

SCTV: The Greatest Show You've Never Heard Of is a 2026 American documentary film, directed by Jason Hehir, about the sketch comedy television show SCTV. The film was released on Netflix on October 30, 2026.

== Reception ==
On the review aggregator website Rotten Tomatoes, 100% of 12 critics' reviews are positive, with an average rating of 8.5/10. Metacritic, which uses a weighted average, assigned the film a score of 85 out of 100, based on four critics, indicating "universal acclaim".

Richard Roeper of RogerEbert.com gave the film three and a half out of four stars and wrote, "[F]or the most part, it is a pure celebration of a legendary series." Glen Weldon of NPR wrote that the film is "excellent". Brian Orndorf of Blu-ray.com gave it a score of 7 out of 10, writing, "The Greatest Show You've Never Heard Of isn't as in-depth or prioritized as one wants from a documentary covering an all-time great comedy show, but it gets the job done when highlighting pure creativity from Canada and the influential ways of SCTV."
