= Brother Bear =

2003 animated Disney film by Aaron Blaise and Robert Walker

- Theatrical release poster
- Directed by: Aaron Blaise; Robert Walker
- Screenplay by: Tab Murphy; Lorne Cameron; David Hoselton; Steve Bencich; Ron J. Friedman
- Story by: Nathan Greno; Stevie Wermers-Skelton; Kevin Deters; Woody Woodman; Thom Enriquez; Kevin Harkey; Broose Johnson; John Norton; John Puglisi
- Produced by: Chuck Williams
- Starring: Joaquin Phoenix; Jeremy Suarez; Rick Moranis; Dave Thomas; Jason Raize; D. B. Sweeney
- Edited by: Tim Mertens
- Music by: Mark Mancina; Phil Collins
- Production companies: Walt Disney Feature Animation; Walt Disney Feature Animation Florida
- Distributed by: Buena Vista Pictures Distribution (Note: Distributed under the Walt Disney Pictures banner.)
- Release dates: October 20, 2003 (New Amsterdam Theatre); November 1, 2003 (United States)
- Running time: 85 minutes
- Country: United States
- Language: English
- Budget: $46 million
- Box office: $250.4 million

Brother Bear is a 2003 American animated musical fantasy adventure comedy-drama film produced by Walt Disney Feature Animation. Directed by Aaron Blaise and Robert Walker, it was written by Tab Murphy, and the writing teams of Lorne Cameron and David Hoselton, and Steve Bencich and Ron J. Friedman. The film features the voices of Joaquin Phoenix, Jeremy Suarez, Rick Moranis, Dave Thomas, Jason Raize (in his only film role), and D. B. Sweeney. The story follows a Native Alaskan boy named Kenai (Phoenix) who kills a grizzly bear in revenge for his brother’s death and is transformed into a bear himself by the Great Spirits as punishment. To become human again, he must travel to a faraway mountain, and he befriends a cub named Koda (Suarez) along the way. The film features original songs written by Phil Collins, and an original musical orchestral score composed by Mark Mancina and Collins.

Brother Bear premiered at the New Amsterdam Theatre on October 20, 2003, and was first released theatrically in the United States by Buena Vista Pictures Distribution on November 1. The film received mixed reviews from critics and grossed $250 million against a $46 million budget. It received a nomination for Best Animated Feature at the 76th Academy Awards. A direct-to-video sequel, Brother Bear 2, was released on August 29, 2006.

== Plot ==
In post-ice age Alaska, the local tribesmen believe all creatures are created through the Great Spirits, who are said to appear in the form of an aurora. A trio of brothers — Sitka, the oldest; Denahi, the middle; and Kenai, the youngest — return to their tribe for Kenai to receive his totem, a necklace in the shape of a different animal, from their shaman Tanana. The particular animal it represents symbolizes the trait he must achieve to claim himself as a man. Unlike Sitka who gained the eagle of guidance, and Denahi who gained the wolf of wisdom, Kenai receives the bear of love. He objects to his totem, stating that bears are feral and thieves, and believes his opinion is vindicated when a female brown grizzly bear steals their basket of sockeye salmon (which Kenai did not tie properly in a hurry to receive his totem). Kenai searches for the basket and finds it devoured.

Kenai finds the bear and provokes it into a fight. His brothers find him, but the fight ends on top of a large glacier. When the bear gets the upper hand, Sitka sacrifices himself to save his brothers by dislodging the glacier, although the bear survives the fall. After Sitka's funeral, a furious Kenai blames the bear for Sitka's death and rejects his totem. He hunts down and chases the bear, slaying it upon a rocky cliff. The Spirits arrive and transform Kenai into a brown grizzly cave bear in the sky, lifted by Sitka's spirit in the form of the bald eagle, after the dead bear's body evaporates itself into the golden river of light and joins them. Denahi arrives and falsely believes that Kenai was killed by the bear from earlier. Kenai falls off the cliff and down some rapids, but survives. Denahi vows to avenge Kenai as a result.

Kenai awakens as he is healed by Tanana and discovers his transformation in panic. She advises him to go to the mountain where the lights touch the earth to find Sitka and the Spirits and be turned back into a human, but only when he atones for his actions. Kenai quickly discovers that he can now understand the wildlife, meeting an outgoing bear cub named Koda whose mother is missing. They make a deal: Kenai will escort Koda to an annual salmon run, and then the cub will lead Kenai to the mountain nearby. Along the way, the two form a brotherly relationship and are joined by moose brothers Rutt and Tuke, riding on the backs of the woolly mammoth herd, all while being chased by Denahi.

Kenai and Koda eventually reach the salmon run, where a large number of bears live like a family. Kenai adjusts to his surroundings and becomes comfortable with the other bears. During story time, Koda tells a story about his mother recently fighting human hunters on a glacier, making Kenai realize that Koda's mother was the bear he fought and killed the entire time. He later confesses the truth to Koda, who runs away grief-stricken, and a remorseful Kenai leaves to reach the mountain. Meanwhile, Rutt and Tuke, having had a falling-out, reconcile in front of Koda, prompting him to forgive Kenai.

On the mountain, Kenai is cornered by Denahi, but their battle is interrupted when Koda intervenes. Kenai goes to Koda's aid out of love, prompting Sitka to appear and change him back into a human. However, upon realizing that Koda needs him, Kenai convinces Sitka to transform him back into a bear with Denahi's support. In the end, Kenai lives with the rest of the bears, gaining his title as a man through being a bear.

== Voice cast ==
- Joaquin Phoenix as Kenai, the younger brother of Sitka and Denahi, who has a hatred of bears. After he callously kills a bear, Kenai is turned into one himself to teach him to see through another's eyes, feel through another's heart, and discover the true meaning of brotherhood. John E. Hurst and Byron Howard served as the supervising animators for Kenai in human and bear form respectively.
- Jeremy Suarez as Koda, a cheeky grizzly bear cub who helps Kenai on his journey to "where the lights touch the earth." Alex Kupershmidt served as the supervising animator for Koda.
- Rick Moranis and Dave Thomas as Rutt and Tuke, a comedic Canadian moose duo. They are based on the comedy duo characters Bob and Doug McKenzie, which are portrayed by Moranis and Thomas.
- Jason Raize as Denahi, the middle brother. This was Jason Raize's only film role before his death in 2004. Harold Gould provides narration from an elderly Denahi's point of view. Ruben A. Aquino served as the supervising animator for Denahi.
- D. B. Sweeney as Sitka, Kenai and Denahi's oldest brother.
- Joan Copeland as Tanana, the shaman-woman of Kenai's tribe.
- Michael Clarke Duncan as Tug, a wise old black bear, and the leader of the bears at the salmon run.
- Greg Proops as Male Lover Bear
- Pauley Perrette as Female Lover Bear
- Estelle Harris as Scrawny Old Lady Bear
- Jo Anne Worley as Fat Old Lady Bear
- Darko Cesar as Foreign Croatian Bear
- Paul Christie and Danny Mastrogiorgio as Rams
- Bumper Robinson as Chipmunks
- Angayuqaq Oscar Kawagley as Narrator

== Production ==
=== Development ===
Following the critical and commercial success of The Lion King (1994), then-Disney chairman and CEO Michael Eisner urged for more animal-centric animated features. He suggested a North American setting, taking particular inspiration from an original landscape painting by Albert Bierstadt that he purchased. For the characters, the hero would be a bear, the king of the forest. At the time, the original idea, which was inspired by King Lear, centered around an old blind bear who traveled the forest with his three daughters. In 1997, veteran animator Aaron Blaise joined the project as director because he "wanted to be attached so that [he] could animate bears", and was soon joined by co-director Robert Walker. Because Blaise desired a more naturalistic story, Blaise and producer Chuck Williams produced a two-page treatment of a father-son story in which the son is transformed into a bear, and in the end, remains a bear. Thomas Schumacher, then-president of Walt Disney Feature Animation, approved the revised story and proclaimed, "This is the idea of the century." Tab Murphy, who had co-written the screenplays for The Hunchback of Notre Dame (1996), Tarzan (1999), and Atlantis: The Lost Empire (2001), came on board to write an early draft of the script.

After the project was green-lit, Blaise, Walker, and the story artists embarked on a research trip in August 1999 to visit Alaska where they traveled on the Valley of Ten Thousand Smokes and Kodiak Island. They also traveled through Denali National Park and the Kenai Fjords National Park, where they visited Exit and Holgate Glacier. A year later, the production team took additional research trips through the Yellowstone National Park, Grand Teton National Park, and the Sequoia National Park. Around 2000, the story evolved into a tale in which the transformed Kenai is taken in by an older bear, Grizz, who was to be voiced by Michael Clarke Duncan. However, Blaise explained that "we were struggling [with the story], trying to get some charm into the film. So we turned Grizz into a cub named Koda", who was voiced by Jeremy Suarez. Because Blaise, Walker, and Williams enjoyed Duncan's vocal performance, Tug, the de facto leader of the bears at the salmon run, was written into the film.

Brother Bear was the third and final animated film produced primarily at Disney-MGM Studios in Orlando, Florida; the studio closed in March 2004, as Disney fully pivoted towards computer animation.

=== Casting ===
In March 2001, Joaquin Phoenix confirmed he was cast in the film, exclaiming, "Oh, but forget the Oscar nomination (for Gladiator). The real pinnacle is that I'm playing an animated character in a Disney film. Isn't that the greatest? I play a Native American transformed into a bear. It's called The Bears. Don't call me a leading man. I don't care about that. I'm a leading bear. I am content!" After the filmmakers heard his audition tapes for Finding Nemo (2003), Jeremy Suarez was hired to voice the role of Koda.

As is typical for animation voice acting, Suarez and Phoenix voiced their roles separately, although they both did a recording session together at least two times. Voicing the moose brothers Rutt and Tuke, Dave Thomas and Rick Moranis performed simultaneously throughout the recording process. Angayuqaq Oscar Kawagley, an associate professor who taught courses on Alaska Native philosophy at the University of Alaska, Fairbanks, claimed he was never given a script, but was instead given "the dialogue that they had written, which was being told by a Native person". For his role as the Inuit Narrator, Kawagley translated the dialogue in written form into Yup'ik and faxed the translation back to the Disney studio. He later recorded his translation at an Anchorage studio while being videotaped for animation reference.

=== Design and animation ===
The film is traditionally animated but includes some CG elements such as "a salmon run and a caribou stampede". Layout artist Armand Serrano, speaking about the drawing process on the film, said that "we had to do a life drawing session with live bear cubs and also outdoor drawing and painting sessions at Fort Wilderness in Florida three times a week for two months [...]". In 2001, Background supervisor Barry Kooser and his team traveled to Jackson Hole, Wyoming and studied with Western landscape painter Scott Christensen, where they learned to: "simplify objects by getting the spatial dimensions to work first and working in the detail later."

According to Ruben Aquino, supervising animator for the character of Denahi, Denahi was originally meant to be Kenai's father; later this was changed to Kenai's brother. Byron Howard, supervising animator for Kenai in bear form, said that earlier in production a bear named Grizz (who resembles Tug in the film and is voiced by the same actor) was supposed to have the role of Kenai's mentor. Art Director Robh Ruppel stated that the ending of the film originally depicting Kenai and Denahi getting together once a year to play when the northern lights are in the sky.

== Music ==
Following the success of the Tarzan soundtrack, Phil Collins was offered the opportunity to compose songs for Brother Bear, as well as let him "co-write the score". However, Collins explained, "Slowly, the bad news started to trickle down that I wouldn't be singing it all. It was a bit of a disappointment, because I [usually] write songs that I sing myself." While Collins composed six songs for the film, he shared vocal performance duties with Tina Turner, who sang the opening song; the Blind Boys of Alabama; and the Bulgarian Women's Choir, who performed the song, "Transformation". Collins's lyrics for the song were first translated into Iñupiaq. The performance was then arranged by score co-composers Collins and Mark Mancina, and vocal arranger Eddie Jobson.

== Release ==
=== Marketing ===
Brother Bear was originally slated for a spring 2004 release, while Home on the Range was scheduled for an autumn 2003 release. However, Disney announced that Brother Bear would be released in fall 2003 while Home on the Range was pushed back for a spring 2004 release. Contrary to speculation, news writer Jim Hill stated the release date switch was not because Home on the Range was suffering from story rewrites, but to promote Brother Bear on the Platinum Edition release of The Lion King. On July 15, 2003, Disney announced that the release date would be moved up by one weekend from its previously scheduled slot of November 7, 2003. However, instead of opening on Halloween, the film would be released on Saturday, November 1, 2003.

=== Theatrical ===
On October 20, 2003, Brother Bear premiered at the New Amsterdam Theatre, where fellow attendees included New York Governor George Pataki and cast members Michael Clarke Duncan and Estelle Harris. Following the screening of the film, Collins performed the song "No Way Out" before introducing Tina Turner to the stage where she performed the opening song, "Great Spirits".

=== Home media ===
Brother Bear was released on VHS and DVD by Walt Disney Home Entertainment on March 30, 2004, the DVD release consists of two separate discs, both of which are THX-certified, the first disc contained the family-friendly widescreen aspect ratio (1.66:1 aspect ratio), and the second disc contained the original theatrical widescreen aspect ratio (1.85:1 and 2.35:1 aspect ratio). The DVD also included a documentary on the production of the film, an audio commentary track by Rutt and Tuke with an option for visual mode, an artwork gallery narrated by the artists, three deleted scenes, two games called "Find Your Totem" and "Bone Puzzle", and two music videos with Phil Collins. By January 2005, the film had earned $169 million in home video sales and rentals. In April 2004 alone, 5.51 million DVD copies of the film were sold.

The film was released in a Blu-ray special edition combined with its sequel, Brother Bear 2, on March 12, 2013.

== Reception ==
=== Critical reaction ===
Brother Bear received mixed reviews from critics. On the review aggregation website Rotten Tomatoes, 38% of 130 critics' reviews, with an average rating of 5.6/10. The website's consensus reads, "Brother Bear is gentle and pleasant if unremarkable Disney fare, with so-so animation and generic plotting." Metacritic, which uses a weighted average, assigned the film a score of 48 out of 100, based on 28 critics, indicating "mixed or average" reviews. Audiences polled by CinemaScore gave the film an average grade of "A" on an A+ to F scale.

On the syndicated television show At the Movies, film critics Roger Ebert and Richard Roeper both gave the film positive reviews. In his print review for the Chicago Sun-Times, Ebert gave 3 out of 4 stars to Brother Bear, and wrote the film "doesn't have the zowie factor of The Lion King or Finding Nemo, but is sweet rather than exciting. Children and their parents are likely to relate on completely different levels, the adults connecting with the transfer of souls from man to beast, while the kids are excited by the adventure stuff." USA Today film critic Claudia Puig gave the film three out of four stars praising the film for its "message of tolerance and respect for nature rings loud and clear. And family audiences are treated to a vibrantly hued movie with appealing characters." Kirk Honeycutt of The Hollywood Reporter called the film "a playful movie that celebrates nature and the spirit world with striking imagery and a smooth blend of drama and comedy."

Writing for Variety, Todd McCarthy summarized that "Brother Bear is a very mild animated entry from Disney with a distinctly recycled feel [because] the film's characters and narrative simply fail to engage strong interest, and tale is probably too resolutely serious to enchant small fry in the way the better Disney titles always have." Kenneth Turan, reviewing for the Los Angeles Times, complimented "the richness and fluidity of its visuals" and the "satisfying ending", but derided that "Brother Bear has an appeal that can't be denied. Too often, however, this film's lack of a fresh dramatic approach and not its technique makes it difficult to embrace as much as we'd like to". Stephen Holden of The New York Times felt the film was too similar to The Lion King. He later wrote: "This opulent movie, with gorgeous rainbow animation, is heavy on message but light on humor."

Many critics and audiences also noted the use of the film's aspect ratio as a storytelling device. The film begins at a standard widescreen aspect ratio of 1.75:1 (similar to the 1.85:1 ratio common in U.S. cinema or the 1.78:1 ratio of HDTV), while Kenai is a human; in addition, the film's art direction and color scheme are grounded in realism. After Kenai transforms into a bear twenty-four minutes into the film, the film itself transforms as well: to an anamorphic widescreen aspect ratio of 2.35:1, and towards brighter, more fanciful colors and slightly more caricatured art direction. Brother Bear was the first feature film since The Horse Whisperer to do an aspect ratio change. It was the only animated film to use this technique, until The Simpsons Movie and Enchanted in 2007. It was the only Disney film to use this technique, until Oz the Great and Powerful in 2013.

=== Box office ===
In its limited release, Brother Bear played only in two selected theaters in Los Angeles and New York City, grossing $291,940 for a per-screen average of $145,970. The wide release followed on November 1, 2003, expanding to 3,030 theater venues. The film opened second behind Scary Movie 3 grossing $18.5 million at the box office. On its second wide weekend, the film continued its strong showing grossing $18.6 million against new competing films such as Elf and The Matrix Revolutions, collecting $44.1 million in three weeks. The film grossed $85.3 million in the United States and Canada, and $165.1 million in international territories, bringing its worldwide total to $250.4 million.

=== Awards and nominations ===
Award	Date of ceremony	Category	Recipients	Result
Academy Awards	February 29, 2004	Best Animated Feature	Aaron Blaise and Robert Walker	Nominated
Annie Awards	February 7, 2004	Best Animated Feature	Brother Bear	Nominated
Annie Awards	February 7, 2004	Outstanding Character Animation	Byron Howard	Nominated
Annie Awards	February 7, 2004	Outstanding Achievement for Animated Effects in an Animated Production	Jason Wolbert	Nominated
Annie Awards	February 7, 2004	Outstanding Achievement for Character Design in a Feature Production	Rune Bennicke	Nominated
Annie Awards	February 7, 2004	Voice Acting in an Animated Feature Production	Jeremy Suarez	Nominated
Annie Awards	February 7, 2004	Music in an Animated Feature Production	Phil Collins and Mark Mancina	Nominated
Annie Awards	February 7, 2004	Outstanding Achievement for Animated Effects in an Animated Production	Jason Wolbert	Nominated
Critics Choice Awards	January 10, 2004	Best Animated Feature	Aaron Blaise and Robert Walker	Nominated
Satellite Awards	February 21, 2004	Best Animated or Mixed Media Film	Brother Bear	Nominated
Satellite Awards	February 21, 2004	Best Original Song	"Great Spirits"	Nominated
Young Artist Award	May 8, 2004	Best Family Feature Film - Animation	Brother Bear	Nominated
Young Artist Award	May 8, 2004	Best Performance in a Voice-Over Role - Young Actor	Jeremy Suarez	Nominated
Florida Film Critics Circle Awards	January 2, 2004	Best Animated Film	Aaron Blaise and Robert Walker	Nominated
Golden Reel Award	2004	Golden Reel Award for Outstanding Achievement in Sound Editing – Sound Effects, Foley, Dialogue and ADR for Animated Feature Film	Richard L. Anderson and Mike Chock (supervising sound editors); Reuben Simon (supervising foley editor); Steve Lee and Piero Mura (sound editors)	Nominated
Saturn Awards	May 5, 2004	Best Animated Feature	Brother Bear	Nominated

== Other media ==
=== Theme parks ===
The song "Welcome" written by Phil Collins was later used as the theme song for Walt Disney's Parade of Dreams during the Happiest Homecoming on Earth, celebrating the 50th anniversary of Disneyland. For the parade, the song had slightly changed lyrics and was performed by an ensemble.

The Disney California Adventure area Redwood Creek Challenge Trail was themed after the film from 2003 to 2009, being replaced by a theme based on the film Up.

=== Cancelled television spin-off ===
Disney Television Animation was set to produce a television series titled Brother Bear: The Series for Disney Channel. The Simpsons veteran Pete Michels was to helm the series and was allowed to watch a copy of the film so that he could construct a pilot. The series would have taken place directly after the events of the film and would have seen Kenai and Koda adopt other orphaned animals into their family. Jeremy Suarez, Rick Moranis and Dave Thomas were to reprise their respective roles while Will Friedle would have replaced Joaquin Phoenix as Kenai. While the pilot tested well, it was not picked up as Disney Channel executives felt that adapting the film as a series was "counterproductive" to their goal of trying to reach a tween audience, combined with the fact that the movie performed below expectations.

=== Sequel ===
A direct-to-video sequel called Brother Bear 2 was released on August 29, 2006. It focuses on the continued adventures of bear brothers Kenai and Koda. While the first film dealt with Kenai's relationship with Koda, this one focuses more on his bond with a young human of his past, Nita.

=== Video game ===
A video game of same name was released by Disney as a tie-in to the film. It was released for Game Boy Advance, Microsoft Windows, and for mobile phones on November 4 in North America and November 21 in Europe. The game received mostly average to good reviews from players.

== See also ==
- Giant Bear
- List of Disney theatrical animated features

== Bibliography ==
- Wakabayashi, Hiro Clark (2003). Brother Bear: A Transformation Tale. New York: Disney Editions. ISBN 978-0-786-85420-2.
