= Animax Entertainment =

Animation production studio

- Type: Animation games
- Industry: television online games
- Founded: 2001
- Defunct: 2016
- Headquarters: Van Nuys, CA, United States
- Key people: Dave Thomas, Founder

Animax Entertainment was an animation and interactive production studio that produced content for all screens. Founded in 2001 by Dave Thomas, an actor, writer, and producer known for his Emmy award-winning work on SCTV, Animax's clients included Disney, ESPN, Warner Bros., National Geographic, Sesame Workshop, WWE and many others. Animax won a Sports Emmy Award in 2006 and was nominated again in 2007 for their work on ESPN.com's "Off-Mikes", based on Mike Golic and Mike Greenberg and their ESPN Radio show Mike and Mike in the Morning. The series was also selected as Adobe Systems' Site of the Day on June 20, 2006. In 2007 the company branched out into live-action production with the launch of a viral video series for Kodak and another for Carl's Jr. that gained "Immortal" status on Funny or Die. The studio closed operations in 2016.

== Divisions ==
The main studio has won a number of awards in addition to the Emmy including multiple Webby Awards, multiple Summit Awards, and multiple Los Angeles Advertising Club Belding Bowls among others. In 2009, the company was added to the Inc. 500 list of fastest-growing companies in America.

== Animations ==
Animax produced Where's My Water?: Swampy's Underground Adventures in house for the Disney Channel as well as cutscenes for the game Where's My Water 2 from Disney Interactive.

The company's television properties include the Canadian animated sitcom Bob & Doug, a revival of their respective SCTV characters, and Popzilla for MTV.

In 2012, Animax animated three two-minute shorts for NBC's hit show Community. The shorts titled "Abed's Master Key," celebrated the return of Community to TV and were featured on the NBC website and Hulu.

== Games ==
In 2007, Animax produced the first ever virtual world for girls for the maker of the Beanie Babies, Ty Inc for a new product line called Ty Girlz.

== Notes ==
- ESPN's Off-Mikes - Sports Emmy Award-winning animated series
- Sports Emmy Nominees and Winners
