= Strange Brew =

1983 comedy film by Rick Moranis and Dave Thomas

- Theatrical release poster by John Solie
- Directed by: Rick Moranis; Dave Thomas
- Written by: Rick Moranis; Dave Thomas; Steve De Jarnatt
- Based on: Bob and Doug McKenzie by Rick Moranis; Dave Thomas
- Produced by: Louis M. Silverstein
- Starring: Dave Thomas; Rick Moranis; Paul Dooley; Max von Sydow
- Cinematography: Steven Poster
- Edited by: Patrick McMahon
- Music by: Charles Fox
- Production company: Metro-Goldwyn-Mayer
- Distributed by: MGM/UA Entertainment Co.
- Release dates: August 19, 1983 (Canada); August 26, 1983 (US)
- Running time: 90 minutes
- Country: Canada; United States
- Language: English
- Budget: $4 million
- Box office: $8.5 million

Strange Brew (also known as The Adventures of Bob & Doug McKenzie: Strange Brew) is a 1983 comedy film starring SCTV characters Bob and Doug McKenzie, portrayed by Dave Thomas and Rick Moranis, who also served as co-directors. Co-stars include Max von Sydow, Paul Dooley, Lynne Griffin, Brian McConnachie and Angus MacInnes. Mel Blanc performs off-screen as the McKenzie brothers' cantankerous father.

Loosely based on elements of Shakespeare's Hamlet, this Canadian and American co-production was shot in Toronto and Scarborough, and in Prince George, British Columbia. The film received mixed reviews from the critics upon release, but was modestly successful commercially, and has developed a cult following. In 2023, The Globe and Mail named the film as one of the best Canadian comedy films ever made.

== Plot ==
Unemployed brothers Bob and Doug McKenzie screen a poorly made film they have produced. When the disappointed patrons become hostile, the brothers release a jar of moths into the theater, which disrupts the showing and allows them to escape without issuing refunds, although they do give one refund to two crying children, which turns out to be the beer money their father gave them. The next day, the two place a live mouse in an empty beer bottle in an attempt to blackmail the local beer store into giving them free beer from Elsinore Brewery, but they are told to take their complaint to Elsinore Brewery's management. When they do so, they are given jobs on the bottling line inspecting for mice in bottles.

Meanwhile, the evil Brewmeister Smith is developing a plan to take over the world by adulterating Elsinore beer with a mind control drug which, while rendering the consumer docile, also makes them vulnerable to mind control when certain tones are played. Smith tests this spiked beer on patients of the neighbouring Royal Canadian Institute for the Mentally Insane, which is connected to the brewery by tunnels.

Bob and Doug learn that the brewery's former owner, John Elsinore, has recently died under mysterious circumstances and his daughter Pam has inherited the family castle and been given full control of the brewery. While exploring the massive complex, they find a shuttered cafeteria containing an old Galactic Border Patrol video game, which supernaturally reveals that Brewmeister Smith murdered John Elsinore and that Pam's bumbling Uncle Claude was involved. Bob recognizes a brewery employee as former hockey great Jean "Rosie" LaRose, who suffered a career-ending nervous breakdown and has fallen under Smith's control.

Eventually, Bob and Doug wander into the Brewmeister's operations room while he is away, and Doug takes a floppy disk containing a video of John Elsinore's murder (thinking it is a "new wave EP bootleg" and not realizing the importance of its contents). Smith and Claude tranquilize the brothers and arrange to frame them for murder, concealing Pam and her father's friend, Henry Green, in beer kegs in the back of their sabotaged van, and instruct the brothers to deliver the kegs to a party. Unable to stop, the brothers careen into Lake Ontario. All survive (Pam with apparent memory loss), and the brothers are arrested.

The brothers' bizarre antics at their trial cause the judge to declare them insane and put them under Brewmeister Smith's care at the asylum. Rosie soon finds them and helps them escape, and they find and rescue Pam. Having figured out the Brewmeister's plan, Rosie foments an uprising among the brainwashed mental-patient test subjects. The brothers separate for the first time in their lives. Doug and a group of asylum inmates help capture Claude, while Rosie and another group overpower Brewmeister Smith. The spirit of John Elsinore, possessing the brewery's electrical system, electrocutes Smith when he is shoved against his light-up world map. Meanwhile, Smith has locked Pam and Bob in a brewery tank and begins filling it with beer. They escape when Bob, having consumed all the beer and expanded to a cartoonish size, belches and blows the side off of the brewery tank. The mental hospital has since caught fire, but Bob is implied to have extinguished the blaze by relieving himself upon it.

John Elsinore's ghost warns them that Smith has already shipped tainted beer to Oktoberfest and urges them to prevent the beer from being consumed. The police accompany the brothers back to their house to retrieve their dog, Hosehead, to invade the party. Enticed by promises of free beer and sausages, Hosehead leaps into the air and flies over the city like a superhero. He crashes into the tent at the celebration and, mistaken for a skunk, frightens people away from the tainted beer. In the end, the McKenzie Brothers are heroes and Pam and Rosie find true love. Bob and Doug are allowed to haul away the contaminated beer, apparently to try to drink it all. The film ends with an over-the-credits commentary by Bob and Doug about the film and select crew members as their names scroll by in the credits.

== Cast ==
- Dave Thomas as Doug McKenzie
- Rick Moranis as Bob McKenzie
- Max von Sydow as Brewmeister Smith
- Lynne Griffin as Pam Elsinore
- Angus MacInnes as Jean "Rosie" LaRose
- Paul Dooley as Uncle Claude
- Brian McConnachie as Ted
- Mel Blanc as voice of Father McKenzie
- Tom Harvey as The Inspector
- Douglas Campbell as Henry Green
- Len Doncheff as Jack Hawkland
- Buddy the Dog as Hosehead
- Chris Benson as Hospital Orderly

== Production ==
In December 1981, Rick Moranis and Dave Thomas released a Bob and Doug McKenzie comedy album, The Great White North, which sold a million copies. The success of the McKenzie brothers led the SCTV show to center an entire 90-minute episode around the characters, "The Great White North Palace", which aired in April 1982. Based on this success, they thought about parlaying that success into a feature film. After fellow SCTV cast member John Candy got an offer from Universal Pictures to do a film called Going Berserk, Moranis and Thomas started talking about writing a screenplay for a Bob and Doug film. Andrew Alexander, executive producer for SCTV, reminded them that he had exclusive contracts with the two men and that if they wrote a script, he would sue them. Moranis and Thomas soon found themselves faced with the challenge of expanding their improvisations on SCTV from "two guys talking about how hard it was to get parking spaces in donut shops to a full-length story", Thomas said in an interview.

Moranis and Thomas hired Steve De Jarnatt to write the first draft. Initially, Thomas told De Jarnatt that he wanted to base the film's story on Hamlet, but De Jarnatt's draft was too faithful to the play and he was told be more creative with the parallels. Moranis' and Thomas' agents sent the script to various Hollywood studios, and a few days later they had a deal with Metro-Goldwyn-Mayer based not on the script but on record sales, "the breakout potential, and the fact that it was being advertised on a television show", Thomas remembers. MGM was unhappy with the script because Bob and Doug were improvised characters done in their "comic voices" and they felt that nobody but themselves could write for these characters. Thomas began rewriting the script without Moranis, who was now uncertain about doing the film. After working on the first 50 pages, Moranis took a look at what Thomas had done and they then worked together rewriting it. However, they were not sure just how much they could legally change and did most of the changes in the first third of the script, including the addition of Bob and Doug's science fiction film, Mutants of 2051 A.D., which Bob and Doug were shown watching in a movie theatre, causing a riot. Thomas remembers that the script was "far more bizarre and conceptual in the beginning ... if we had been able to rewrite the whole thing, we would have made the whole thing like that".

Originally, Moranis and Thomas were not going to direct or write the film but ended up doing both with the guidance of executive producer Jack Grossberg, who had produced films by Mel Brooks and Woody Allen. They were given a budget of $5 million. Before filming, all of the major breweries wanted the McKenzie brothers to appear in beer advertisements. The filmmakers had the promise of the Molson Brewery, but once the brewery found out that there was a joke in the film about putting a mouse in a beer bottle, they distanced themselves from the film. The filmmakers were also banned from filming in a Brewers Retail store, and from using the name "Brewers Retail". The filmmakers instead built a replica of a Brewers Retail store at a cost of more than $45,000, calling it "The Beer Store". Filming also took place at the Old Fort Brewing Co. in Prince George, British Columbia. The emergency vehicles used during filming were all real Metropolitan Toronto Police squad cars. The ambulances used briefly were on loan from Metropolitan Toronto Ambulance.

When informed that Mel Blanc charged $10,000 an hour for his services, Moranis and Thomas paid him $10,000 and had him record all the dialogue for his character in an hour.

== Soundtrack ==
The soundtrack album was released in August 1983 by PolyGram and Anthem Records of Canada (ANR 1-1042). (Full title: The Adventures of Bob and Doug McKenzie: Strange Brew - Excerpts from the Original Soundtrack). Most of the album consisted of comedy sketches and film dialogue, while the music sampling was usually accompanied by the characters' commentary. The main title theme was performed by Thomas' brother, Ian Thomas. The album was produced by Marc Giacomelli, Rick Shurman and Ian Thomas. The soundtrack won the Canadian Juno Award for Best Comedy Album in 1984. Moranis and Thomas accepted the award in character at the awards ceremony on 5 December 1984, which was hosted by Joe Flaherty and SCTV alum Andrea Martin. The album was only available for a short time and currently remains out of print. This was the last album released by the duo.

=== Score ===
As with the soundtrack album, the motion picture score was released for a short time and remains out of print. The album runs approximately 63 minutes and was composed and conducted by Charles Fox.

== Reception ==
=== Critical response ===
On Rotten Tomatoes, Strange Brew has an approval rating of 76% based on reviews from 25 critics with an average rating of 6.70/10. The site's critical consensus reads: "Though lowbrow in intent and outcome, Strange Brew effectively mines laughs from its unique premise and likeable stars." On Metacritic, the film received a score of 50 based on six reviews, indicating "mixed or average reviews". In her review for The New York Times, Janet Maslin wrote: "Anyone who's partial to the McKenzies' humor doubtless has a fondness for beer. The price of a ticket could buy enough beer for an experience at least as memorable as this one." Gary Arnold, in his review for The Washington Post, wrote: "Neither triumph nor fiasco, Strange Brew leaves plenty of room for improvement, but I hope Thomas and Moranis get the chance to demonstrate that they've learned a lot from the mixed assortment of nuttiness in their first movie comedy." In his review for The Globe and Mail, Jay Scott wrote: "What's terrific about the McKenzie Brothers is their offhand depiction of two English-Canadian working-class dimwits ... and what's terrific about the movie is its equally offhand surrealism." Leonard Maltin was complimentary: "Uneven but likably goofy film about Bob and Doug, the beer-guzzling McKenzie Brothers ... Lags at times, but keeps coming up with funny scenes, especially when playing with the conventions of moviemaking."

In 2023, Barry Hertz of The Globe and Mail named the film as one of the 23 best Canadian comedy films ever made.

== Tie-in book ==
To promote the film, a beer-shaped paperback book was released in 1983, The Adventures of Bob & Doug McKenzie in Strange Brew: The Book About the Movie About the TV Show About the Men! The book featured pictures of the characters, stills from Strange Brew, comics, puzzles and much of the characters' humor. The book also included a joke library card with the names of numerous Canadian celebrities who had checked it out. The book was only available for a brief period and is currently out of print.

== Cancelled sequel ==
A sequel to the film, entitled Home Brew, was planned for production in 1999, but financing fell through at the last minute. Co-written by Dave Thomas and Paul Flaherty, the film was to be directed by Flaherty, and Dan Aykroyd was on board to play the part of friend Rick Ripple. At one point, Todd McFarlane was to step in as executive producer to revive financing for the film, but never followed through.

The plot, according to a Maple Palm (Dave Thomas's production company) release, would feature Bob and Doug, now working as garbage men, being convinced by a fast-talking insurance salesman (Aykroyd) to get into the microbrewing business.

== See also ==
- List of films featuring fictional films
