= Honey, I Shrunk the Kids (franchise) =

American media franchise

- Franchise logo
- Created by: Stuart Gordon; Brian Yuzna; Ed Naha
- Original work: Honey, I Shrunk the Kids (1989)
- Owner: The Walt Disney Company

Films and television
- Film(s): Honey, I Shrunk the Kids (1989); Honey, I Blew Up the Kid (1992)
- Television series: Honey, I Shrunk the Kids: The TV Show (1997–2000)
- Direct-to-video: Honey, We Shrunk Ourselves (1997)

Miscellaneous
- Theme park attraction(s): Honey, I Shrunk the Kids: Movie Set Adventure (1990–2016); Honey, I Shrunk the Audience (1994–2010)

Honey, I Shrunk the Kids is an American science fiction comedy media franchise, based on a concept created by Stuart Gordon and Brian Yuzna, and an original story co-written by Gordon, Yuzna, and Ed Naha. The franchise focuses around the Szalinski family, particularly the father, Wayne Szalinski, who is a struggling inventor whose inventions unintentionally cause trouble and mishaps.

The first installment, Honey, I Shrunk the Kids (1989), and its subsequent financial and critical success, led to two sequels and a television series; Honey, I Blew Up the Kid (1992), Honey, We Shrunk Ourselves (1997), and Honey, I Shrunk the Kids: The TV Show (1997–2000), respectively. A fourth film titled Shrunk entered production in 2019 and is in development limbo.

This continued in 1999 when the Honey, I Shrunk the Kids films, along with a number of other Disney film series, were combined into a franchise as a part of Disney Parks' attractions where elements from each movie were included.

== Film ==
Title	U.S. release date	Director	Screenwriters	Story by	Producer(s)
Honey, I Shrunk the Kids	June 23, 1989	Joe Johnston	Ed Naha and Tom Schulman	Stuart Gordon, Brian Yuzna & Ed Naha	Penney Finkelman Cox
Honey, I Blew Up the Kid	July 17, 1992	Randal Kleiser	Thom Eberhardt, Peter Elbling and Garry Goodrow	Garry Goodrow	Dawn Steel and Edward S. Feldman
Honey, We Shrunk Ourselves	March 18, 1997	Dean Cundey	Karey Kirkpatrick, Nell Scovell and Joel Hodgson		Barry Bernardi

=== Honey, I Shrunk the Kids (1989) ===
Rick Moranis stars as Wayne Szalinski, an eccentric inventor who accidentally shrinks his kids, Amy (Amy O'Neill) and Nick (Robert Oliveri) as well as the next-door neighbor's sons, Russ Jr. (Thomas Wilson Brown) and Ron Thompson (Jared Rushton). Marcia Strassman portrays his wife, Diane, to whom he delivers the titular line. Matt Frewer and Kristine Sutherland also star as Russ and Mae Thompson, Russ Jr. and Ron's parents.

=== Honey, I Blew Up the Kid (1992) ===
Three years after the events of the first film, the Szalinskis have moved to a new neighborhood and given birth to their third child, Adam (Joshua and Daniel Shalikar). Nick is now a teenager and Amy is heading off to college. Wayne has given up his shrink ray days and invented an alternative which makes objects grow in size. One day when Adam is exposed to its effects, he mistakes Nick and his crush, Mandy Park (Keri Russell), as toys and wanders into Las Vegas. While Wayne and Diane race to reverse his effects, Wayne's insolent coworker, Dr. Charles Hendrickson (John Shea), has overpowered Sterling Labs, rounded up the military, and ordered Adam to be stopped at all costs.

=== Honey, We Shrunk Ourselves (1997) ===
Wayne is now banned from using his shrink ray by the committee of the U.S. Food and Drug Administration (FDA). Nick is now away at college and Adam (Bug Hall) is ten years old. Diane (Eve Gordon) is planning a vacation with her sister-in-law, Patti (Robin Bartlett), while Wayne and his brother, Gordon (Stuart Pankin), watch Adam and his cousins, Jenny and Mitch (Allison Mack and Jake Richardson). While tampering with the shrink ray, Wayne accidentally shrinks himself, Diane, Gordon, and Patti. The kids have a party in the house after thinking they have it to themselves. The adults struggle to get their attention before disaster strikes among them.

=== Future ===
In February 2018 a reboot film was in development, with the project being courted for a Disney+ exclusive. By March 2019, this changed when the project was announced to be a legacy sequel to the original trilogy. With The Walt Disney Studios developing the film for theatrical release, Josh Gad was announced to star as Nick Szalinski. The plot would reportedly have centered around Nick following in Wayne's footsteps and becoming a scientist and inventor, accidentally shrinking his son and two daughters to five inches tall. By December, Joe Johnston had entered early negotiations to return to the franchise as director.

In January 2020, Rick Moranis entered early negotiations to come out of his acting retirement, and reprise his role as Wayne Szalinski. Johnston was confirmed to direct, with Todd Rosenberg set to write the script, from an original story by Gad, Ryan Dixon, Ian Helfer, and Jay Reiss. By February, Moranis had officially signed onto the project to reprise his role. David Hoberman and Todd Lieberman would serve as producers. The film would be a joint-venture production between Walt Disney Pictures and Mandeville Films, with Walt Disney Studios Motion Pictures as the distributing company. Principal photography was scheduled to begin in early 2020, with filming taking place in Toronto, as well as Atlanta, Georgia. In March of the same year, filming on all Disney projects was halted due to the COVID-19 pandemic and industry restrictions worldwide. In November, Disney CEO Bob Chapek announced that filming on all movies that had been postponed by the coronavirus had resumed. In June 2021, Gad stated that filming had not yet started and that he was hoping the shoot would begin in early 2022. In January 2022, Gad stated that he and Moranis had once again started collaborating in preparation for the sequel. In June 2023, Gad revealed on Twitter that the project has been put on hold indefinitely, although he expressed hope that production would resume in the future.

== Television series ==
The television series, exclusive to Disney Channel, expanded upon the original film's concept where a shrinking experiment had gone wrong, to include a variety of experiments malfunctioning and causing unfortunate circumstances for the Szalinskis. It debuted on September 1, 1997, and ran for three consecutive seasons. It concluded after the 66th episode aired on May 20, 2000. It was a joint-production between Plymouth Productions, St. Clare Entertainment, and Walt Disney Television; while Buena Vista Television distributed the show through Disney Channel.

== Theme park attractions ==
Title	U.S. release date	Director	Screenwriters	Story by	Producer(s)
Honey, I Shrunk the Audience!	November 21, 1994	Randal Kleiser	Bill Prady and Steve Spiegel	Daniel Restuccio	Thomas G. Smith

=== Honey, I Shrunk the Audience! ===
A 4-D movie-ride attraction titled Honey, I Shrunk the Audience! debuted at Epcot in 1994 and featured at the Disney theme parks until 2010. Rick Moranis, Marcia Strassman, Robert Oliveri, and Daniel and Joshua Shalikar reprise their roles from the feature-length films. While being given an award by Dr. Nigel Channing (Eric Idle) about his shrink ray, Wayne accidentally shrinks the audience and sends them on an adventure with rats, snakes, and babies.

=== Journey into Imagination with Figment ===
In 1999, the Epcot attraction Journey into Imagination was remodeled. The newer attraction features Dr. Nigel Channing, from Honey, I Shrunk the Audience!, who "hosts" an area known as the Imagination Institute. The story states that his grandfather established the institute, while the area features references to Wayne Szalinski, as well as Dr. Philip Brainard from Flubber and Dean Higgins (Joe Flynn's role in the Dexter Riley films). Walt Disney and Thomas Edison also make an appearance.

=== Honey, I Shrunk the Kids: Movie Set Adventure ===
Opened in 1990, the attraction was a playground area at Disney's Hollywood Studios, designed to look like a movie set for the giant backyard scenes of the first film. It closed in 2016.

== Main cast and characters ==
Character	Films			Attraction	Television series		
Character	Honey, I Shrunk the Kids	Honey, I Blew Up the Kid	Honey, We Shrunk Ourselves	Honey, I Shrunk the Audience!	Honey, I Shrunk the Kids: The TV Show		
Character	Honey, I Shrunk the Kids	Honey, I Blew Up the Kid	Honey, We Shrunk Ourselves	Honey, I Shrunk the Audience!	Season 1	Season 2	Season 3
Wayne Szalinski	Rick Moranis	Rick Moranis	Rick Moranis	Rick Moranis	Peter Scolari	Peter Scolari	Peter Scolari
Diane Szalinski	Marcia Strassman	Marcia Strassman	Eve Gordon	Marcia Strassman	Barbara Alyn Woods	Barbara Alyn Woods	Barbara Alyn Woods
Amy Szalinski	Amy O'Neill	Amy O'Neill			Hillary Tuck	Hillary Tuck	Hillary Tuck
Nick Szalinski	Robert Oliveri	Robert Oliveri		Robert Oliveri	Thomas Dekker	Thomas Dekker	Thomas Dekker
Quark	Sammy	Sammy		Uncredited	Matese	Rusty	Rusty
Adam Szalinski		Daniel Shalikar & Joshua Shalikar	Bug Hall	Daniel Shalikar & Joshua Shalikar			
Russell Thompson Sr.	Matt Frewer						
Mae Thompson	Kristine Sutherland						
Russell Thompson Jr.	Thomas Brown						
Ronald "Ron" Thompson	Jared Rushton						
Clifford Sterling		Lloyd Bridges					
Mandy Park		Keri Russell					
Dr. Charles Hendrickson		John Shea					
U.S. Marshal Preston Brooks		Ron Canada					
Nosey Neighbors		Linda Carlson					
Nosey Neighbors		Julia Sweeney					
Constance Winters		Leslie Neale					
Terence Wheeler		Gregory Sierra					
Gordon Szalinski			Stuart Pankin				
Patti Szalinski			Robin Bartlett				
Jenny Szalinski			Allison Mack				
Mitch Szalinski			Jake Richardson				
Ricky King			Jojo Adams				
Trey			Theodore Borders				
Vince			Bryson Aust				
Dr. Nigel Channing				Eric Idle			
Chief Jake McKenna						George Buza	George Buza

== Additional crew and production details ==
Film	Composer	Cinematographer	Editor	Production companies	Distributing companies	Running time
Honey, I Shrunk the Kids	James Horner	Hiro Narita	Michael A. Stevenson	Doric Productions; Walt Disney Pictures; Silver Screen Partners III	Buena Vista Pictures	93 minutes
Honey, I Blew Up the Kid	Bruce Broughton	John Hora	Michael A. Stevenson; Harry Hitner	Walt Disney Pictures; Touchwood Pacific Partners 1	Buena Vista Pictures	89 minutes
Honey, I Shrunk the Audience!	Bruce Broughton	C.W. Fallin	Patrick Paul Mullane	Theme Park Productions; Eastman Kodak Company	Walt Disney Attractions	23 minutes
Honey, We Shrunk Ourselves	Michael Tavera	Ray Stella	Charles Bornstien	Walt Disney Pictures	Buena Vista Home Video; Walt Disney Home Video	75 minutes

== Reception ==
=== Box office performance ===
Film	Box office gross			Box office ranking		Budget	Ref.
Film	North America	Other territories	Worldwide	All-time North America	All-time worldwide	Budget	Ref.
Honey, I Shrunk the Kids	$130,724,172	$92,000,000	$222,724,172	#470	#688	$18,000,000	
Honey, I Blew Up the Kid	$58,662,452	$37,167,000	$95,829,452	#1,427	—N/a	$40,000,000	
Honey, We Shrunk Ourselves	—N/a	—N/a	—N/a	—N/a	—N/a	$7,000,000	
Shrunk	—N/a	—N/a	—N/a	—N/a	—N/a	—N/a	

=== Critical and public response ===
Film	Rotten Tomatoes	Metacritic	CinemaScore
Honey, I Shrunk the Kids	78% (32 reviews)	63 (11 reviews)	A
Honey, I Blew Up the Kid	40% (20 reviews)	50 (14 reviews)	B+
Honey, We Shrunk Ourselves	25% (8 reviews)	—N/a	—N/a
