= Honey, I Shrunk the Kids =

1989 science fiction comedy film

- Theatrical release poster
- Directed by: Joe Johnston
- Screenplay by: Ed Naha; Tom Schulman
- Story by: Stuart Gordon; Brian Yuzna; Ed Naha
- Produced by: Penney Finkelman Cox
- Starring: Rick Moranis; Matt Frewer; Marcia Strassman; Kristine Sutherland; Thomas Brown; Jared Rushton; Amy O'Neill; Robert Oliveri
- Cinematography: Hiro Narita
- Edited by: Michael A. Stevenson
- Music by: James Horner
- Production companies: Walt Disney Pictures; Silver Screen Partners III
- Distributed by: Buena Vista Pictures Distribution
- Release date: June 23, 1989
- Running time: 93 minutes
- Country: United States
- Language: English
- Budget: $18 million
- Box office: $222.7 million

Honey, I Shrunk the Kids is a 1989 American science fiction comedy film. It is the first installment of a film franchise and served as the directorial debut of visual effects artist Joe Johnston. The film stars Rick Moranis as a struggling inventor who creates an energy-projecting machine that accidentally shrinks his and his neighbors' children to a height of a quarter of an inch. After being accidentally thrown out with the trash, the children must work together and venture their way back through a backyard wilderness filled with dangerous insects and man-made hazards.

Honey, I Shrunk the Kids was released theatrically in the United States on June 23, 1989, and distributed by Buena Vista Pictures Distribution. It was an unexpected box office success, grossing $222.7 million worldwide (equivalent to $576.6 million in 2025), becoming the highest-grossing live-action Disney film of all time, a record it held for five years, and the seventh-highest-grossing film of 1989 worldwide. Its success led to two sequels, beginning with Honey, I Blew Up the Kid in 1992, as well as a television series and several theme-park attractions. An animated short film, Tummy Trouble starring Roger Rabbit, was shown with the film during its theatrical run.

== Plot ==
Scientist and inventor Wayne Szalinski has been designing an energy-projecting machine intended to shrink and grow objects, but it instead explodes them. Wayne has yet to figure out how to fix it, and his obsession with the machine worries his hardworking wife, realtor Diane, 15-year-old teenage daughter Amy, and 11-year-old aspiring inventor son Nick. Next door, Big Russ Thompson, his wife Mae, and their 12-year-old younger son Ron are preparing for a fishing trip. Their 15-year-old elder son, Little Russ Thompson, is less than enthusiastic, as his interests often clash with his father's.

Shortly after Wayne leaves for a conference, Ron accidentally hits a baseball through the Szalinski's attic window and into the machine, turning it on and blocking its targeting laser which fortuitously fixes the shrinking function. Caught by his brother, Ron is forced to confess to Amy and Nick. Ron and Nick enter the attic in an attempt to retrieve the ball, but the machine shrinks them. Amy and Little Russ later suffer the same fate when they go searching for their siblings.

At his conference, Wayne is laughed off the stage for failing to provide proof that his machine works. He returns home and enters the attic seconds after the machine turns off; the shrunken children try to get his attention, but their voices are only loud enough to be heard by the family dog, Quark. Already frustrated, Wayne discovers the broken window and snaps, repeatedly striking the machine. He sweeps the debris, along with the kids, into a dustpan and a trash bag. The four manage to escape, only to discover that the trash bag is now at the curb; they make their way back home through the Szalinski's overgrown yard. While trying to get back, they have a harrowing encounter with a bee, which separates them.

Meanwhile, the Thompson and Szalinski parents become uneasy at their children's absence. Big Russ and Mae cancel their fishing trip and file a missing persons report with the police. Wayne returns to the attic, sees the machine now works, and deduces it shrunk the kids. Realizing what he did, he goes to the yard, sees they escaped the trash bag, and gently searches the grass, but accidentally activates some sprinklers. As a result, Amy nearly drowns in a mud puddle, but Little Russ dives in to pull her out and revive her with rescue breaths. Wayne eventually reveals the truth to Diane, and she joins in the search. Later, she convinces Wayne to share the information with the Thompsons, but they remain skeptical.

The kids feast on one of Nick's discarded Oatmeal Creme Pie cookies, and use a crumb to capture a friendly forager ant, naming it "Antie" and riding it toward the house. As night falls, the group takes shelter in a Lego piece. Amy and Little Russ begin to express feelings for one another and share a kiss. The kids are suddenly attacked by a scorpion; Antie rescues them and fights the scorpion off, but, in the process, is stung by the scorpion and dies.

The next morning, Nick's friend Tommy arrives to mow the lawn. The kids are forced to seek shelter in an earthworm tunnel, barely escaping the vortex caused by the mower, which Wayne and Diane shut off just in time. The kids hitch a ride on Quark and enter the house, but Nick falls into a bowl of Cheerios and is nearly eaten by his father. Quark bites Wayne's ankle to get his attention; Wayne discovers the kids' presence and works to repair the machine.

Both families meet in the attic, and the kids use charades to inform Wayne that the baseball blocked the laser, which previously overheated targets and caused them to explode. Wayne corrects the problem, and Big Russ volunteers as a test subject; after the test succeeds, he and the kids are restored to their original sizes.

Months later at Thanksgiving, the Szalinskis and Thompsons have become good friends and are toasting over an enlarged turkey, while Quark feasts on an enlarged dog biscuit.

== Cast ==
- Rick Moranis as Wayne Szalinski, Diane's husband
- Marcia Strassman as Diane Szalinski, Wayne's wife
- Amy O'Neill as Amy Szalinski, Wayne & Diane's teenage daughter
- Robert Oliveri as Nick Szalinski, Wayne & Diane's son
- Matt Frewer as Russell "Big Russ" Thompson Sr., the Szalinskis' neighbor
- Kristine Sutherland as Mae Thompson, the Szalinskis' neighbor
- Thomas Brown as Russell "Little Russ" Thompson Jr., Big Russ & Mae's older son
- Jared Rushton as Ronald "Ron" Thompson, Big Russ & Mae's younger son
- Carl Steven as Tommy Pervis, Nick's friend
- Mark L. Taylor as Donald "Don" Forrester
- Kimmy Robertson as Gloria Forrester
- Lou Cutell as Dr. Brainard
- Laura Waterbury as Female Cop
- Trevor Galtress as Male Cop
- Martin Aylett as Harold Boorstein
- Janet Sunderland as Lauren Boorstein
- Craig Richard Nelson as Prof. Frederickson (uncredited)
- Frank Welker as Special Vocal Effects (voice)

== Production ==
The project was originally brought to Disney Studios by Stuart Gordon and Brian Yuzna. Gordon was hired to direct the film, and Yuzna to produce. The film was written as Teeny Weenies by Gordon, Ed Naha, and Yuzna. Tom Schulman was later added as a screenwriter. Gordon originally prepped the film but had to drop out as director shortly before filming began due to illness. Joe Johnston was brought in to replace him, while Penny Finkleman Cox replaced Yuzna as producer.

As the title Teeny Weenies seemed to appeal more to a child demographic, the name was changed to Grounded to appeal to a more mature audience. That name was later rejected in favor of The Big Backyard. Honey, I Shrunk the Kids, based on a line of dialogue from the film, ultimately became its title. (The title was later criticized for its grammar, as the past tense of "shrink" is normally "shrank".) The film was heavily influenced by 1950s fare, such as The Incredible Shrinking Man.

The film's opening title animation was provided by Kroyer Films, Inc.

=== Casting ===
Judy Taylor, Mike Fenton, and Lynda Gordon were the casting directors. Before Rick Moranis was cast as Wayne Szalinski, the script was written with Chevy Chase in mind because of his popularity in National Lampoon's Vacation. He was filming the second sequel, National Lampoon's Christmas Vacation, therefore was unavailable to portray Wayne.

John Candy was also considered for the role of Wayne. He declined, but suggested to Johnston that his friend (and costar of SCTV, Little Shop of Horrors, and Spaceballs), Moranis, would be a good choice. Marcia Strassman (at the time best known as Julie Kotter from the sitcom Welcome Back, Kotter) portrays Wayne's wife, Diane.

Russ Jr. was portrayed by Thomas Wilson Brown, while Jared Rushton portrayed Ron. Rushton has stated that he took the role after finding the script "appealing," and he believed his character had evolved throughout the film, reflecting his personality.

Amy O'Neill and Robert Oliveri were cast as Amy and Nick Szalinski, Wayne and Diane's kids. Oliveri commented that he was in awe of watching his stunt double do his stunts. He later starred as Kevin Boggs in Tim Burton's Edward Scissorhands. O'Neill thought the film was a fun experience, particularly enjoying off-set activities like swimming or playing cards with the other younger cast members. She accepted the role because it was a "Disney movie".

=== Direction ===
Johnston was selected to direct the film for his directorial debut, having worked mostly on films as an effects illustrator and art director. It was filmed at the backlot of Churubusco Studios in Mexico City. Gregg Fonseca was the production designer and was in charge of managing several different sets for the scenes in it.

Some filming took place in the streets of Mexico City. In the scene where Diane walks out of the mall to the pay phone, a sign says "Beverly Hills Mall", but it is in fact Plaza Inn, a mall in Mexico City.

Special effects were heavily used for the film, such as the electronically controlled ants and bees. For the most part, the production team tried to use practical effects that would work in camera. For the scene where Wayne lands in the Thompsons' pool, Moranis jumped off a flying board in the form of a teeter-totter on a swing set. A stuntman pushed the board, sending him flying through the air and landing on a mat. Other visual effects utilized on stop-motion animation, puppetry, trick camera shots, and different lenses. Numerous storyboards were used for the film, particularly in the sprinkler and bee scenes. Scale models were also used for the bee scene, with miniature Russ Jr. and Nick plastic figures attached. Forced perspective was used in the giant cookie scene to make it seem bigger. The child actors were strapped in for the scene with the broom. The bristles were actually pieces of foam that were carved and tied to a rig system.

== Reception ==
=== Box office ===
The film opened on June 23, 1989, in 1,371 theaters. It opened at number 2 in the United States behind Batman, with a weekend gross of $14,262,961, Buena Vista's biggest 3-day weekend of all time. It earned $130,724,172 domestically and $92,000,000 in other territories, earning a grand total of $222,724,172. Attached to it was Disney and Amblin Entertainment's first Roger Rabbit short, Tummy Trouble. The short also featured music composed by James Horner, and was executive produced by Steven Spielberg, produced by Don Hahn, and directed by Rob Minkoff.

=== Critical response ===
On Rotten Tomatoes, Honey, I Shrunk the Kids has an approval rating of 76% based on reviews from 37 critics, with an average rating of 6.30/10. The consensus reads, "Even as its special effects take center stage, Honey, I Shrunk the Kids still offers a charming, high-spirited sense of adventure for the whole family." Metacritic gave the film a score of 63 based on 11 reviews, indicating "generally favorable" reviews. Audiences polled by CinemaScore gave the film an average grade of "A" on an A+ to F scale.

Caryn James, of The New York Times, gave a positive review, saying: "As sweet, funny, and straightforward as its title." Variety gave another positive review, stating, "[It's] in the best tradition of Disney – and even better than that, because it is not so juvenile that adults won't be thoroughly entertained." A negative review came from Roger Ebert of the Chicago Sun-Times, who stated: "The special effects are all there, nicely in place, and the production values are sound, but the movie is dead in the water."

The film was also mentioned in the British sitcom Only Fools and Horses in the episode titled "Rodney Come Home".

=== Awards ===
James Horner won an ASCAP Award for Top Box Office Films and was also nominated for a Saturn Award. The film was also nominated for a Saturn Award for Best Science Fiction Film. Thomas Wilson Brown, Jared Rushton, Robert Oliveri, and the Special Effects Crew were also nominated for a Saturn Award. The Special Effects Crew won a BAFTA Award for Best Special Visual Effects. Amy O'Neill and Jared Rushton were each nominated for a Young Artist Award, and director Joe Johnston was nominated for a Fantasporto Award.

The film was featured in the 100 Greatest Family Films, where Amy O'Neill and Thomas Wilson Brown discussed it on MTV.

== Soundtrack ==
Honey, I Shrunk the Kids

Soundtrack album by James Horner
- Released: March 6, 2009
- Genre: Soundtrack
- Length: 51:10
- Label: Intrada Records
- Producers: James Horner; Simon Rhodes

After years of being unreleased, James Horner's soundtrack to the film was made available by Intrada Records on March 6, 2009. The song that Amy dances to in the kitchen is "Turn It Up" by Nick Kamen, written by Jeffrey Pescetto and Patrick DeRemer.

The soundtrack was limited to a 3,000-copy release. Horner's main title music incorporates cues from the score by Nino Rota for Federico Fellini's film Amarcord (1973) and Raymond Scott's piece "Powerhouse B" (1937), the latter often referenced in Carl Stalling's Warner Bros. cartoon scores. Scott's piece was used without payment or credit, leading his estate to threaten legal action against Disney. Disney paid an undisclosed sum in an out-of-court settlement and changed the film's cue sheets to credit Scott. Horner's main title music underscores all the major moments involving Szalinski's technology.

Horner produced the record with longtime engineer Simon Rhodes. It was performed by the London Symphony Orchestra.

== Disney Parks incorporation ==
=== Studio Backlot Tour ===
Following the film's success, one of its special effects was recreated by park guests on the Walking Tour portion of the Studio Backlot Tour at Disney's Hollywood Studios (then known as Disney-MGM Studios) throughout the 1990s.

Two children from the tour would volunteer to be strapped to the side of a giant prop bee in front of a green screen and be videotaped acting distressed by the simulated flight of the bee. Using a robotic camera and chroma key technology, footage from Honey, I Shrunk the Kids would be incorporated into the finished video and displayed immediately afterward on television screens mounted throughout the room. The video then transitioned into a scripted segment recorded by film critics Gene Siskel and Roger Ebert (on the set of their syndicated television series Siskel & Ebert), critiquing the special effects but giving "Two thumbs up for the kids!"

=== Honey, I Shrunk the Kids: Movie Set Adventure ===
From 1990 until 2016, a playground at Disney's Hollywood Studios recreated the overgrown backyard set of the film.

=== Honey, I Shrunk the Audience ===
A three-dimensional film called Honey, I Shrunk the Audience! complete with physical effects such as wind and water, was created as an attraction at Walt Disney World's Epcot in 1994, and later made its way to Disneyland, Tokyo Disneyland, and Disneyland Park Paris, with all four parks featuring the attraction by 1999. The film was a replacement for the Michael Jackson film Captain EO.

== Sequels ==
=== Honey, I Blew Up the Kid ===
In 1992, Disney released the first sequel, Honey, I Blew Up the Kid, with Moranis, Strassman, O'Neill, and Oliveri reprising their roles as Wayne, Diane, Amy, and Nick Szalinski. In the film, Wayne succeeds in enlarging his two-year-old son, Adam, to gigantic proportions as one of his size-changing experiments goes awry.

=== Honey, We Shrunk Ourselves ===
In 1997, Disney produced the second sequel, Honey, We Shrunk Ourselves, as a direct-to-video release. Rick Moranis was the only actor to reprise his role. The characters of Diane and Adam were recast, with Amy and Nick being briefly mentioned in passing. Many new characters were added, including Wayne's brother Gordon and his family. In this film, the parents are shrunk and need to be rescued by their kids.

=== TV series ===
In 1997, television program Honey, I Shrunk the Kids: The TV Show premiered. Peter Scolari took over as Wayne, and Nick and Amy both returned as characters, roughly the same age as in the original film, and played by new actors. Its plots involved other Wayne's inventions that do not work quite as expected and land the family in some type of adventure.

=== Future ===
On February 21, 2018, it was announced that live-action remakes of several films are in development as exclusive content for Disney+, with one of those named in the announcement as being Honey, I Shrunk the Kids. It was later confirmed that a "legacy-sequel" film titled Shrunk is in development to be released theatrically, with a plot that centers around Nick Szalinski as an adult scientist. Josh Gad will star as Nick in the film. On December 5, 2019, it was reported that Joe Johnston is in talks to return as director. On February 12, 2020, it was reported that Rick Moranis will come out of his long semi-retirement to reprise his role as Wayne Szalinski and that Johnston is now confirmed to direct. The plot centers around an adult Nick who accidentally shrinks his two daughters and son to five inches tall, forcing them to cope with their new sizes as he seeks his estranged father Wayne's help to fix the machine. Julia Butters has been rumored to play Nick's daughter, Sara. Robyn Adele Anderson has reportedly been cast as a babysitter named Teresa who also ends up getting shrunk.

In January 2020, Moranis entered early negotiations to come out of his acting retirement and reprise his role as Wayne Szalinski. Johnston was confirmed to direct, with Todd Rosenberg set to write the script, from an original story by Gad, Ryan Dixon, Ian Helfer, and Jay Reiss. By February, Moranis had officially signed onto the project to reprise his role. David Hoberman and Todd Lieberman will serve as producers. The film will be a joint-venture production between Walt Disney Pictures and Mandeville Films, with Walt Disney Studios Motion Pictures as the distributing company. Principal photography was scheduled to begin in early 2020, with filming taking place in Toronto, as well as Atlanta, Georgia. In March of the same year, filming on all Disney projects was halted due to the COVID-19 pandemic and industry restrictions worldwide. In November, then-Disney CEO Bob Chapek announced that filming on all movies that had been postponed by the coronavirus had resumed. In June 2021, Gad stated that filming had not yet started and that he was hoping the shoot would begin in early 2022. In January 2022, Gad stated that he and Moranis had once again started collaborating in preparation for the sequel. In June 2023, Gad revealed on Twitter that the project had been put on hold indefinitely, although he expressed hope that production would resume in the near future.

== See also ==
- List of films featuring miniature people
