= Honey, We Shrunk Ourselves =

1997 film by Dean Cundey

- Home video release poster
- Directed by: Dean Cundey
- Written by: Karey Kirkpatrick; Nell Scovell; Joel Hodgson
- Based on: Honey, I Shrunk the Kids by Stuart Gordon; Brian Yuzna; Ed Naha
- Produced by: Barry Bernardi
- Starring: Rick Moranis; Eve Gordon; Robin Bartlett; Allison Mack; Jake Richardson; Stuart Pankin; Bug Hall
- Cinematography: Ray Stella
- Edited by: Charles Bornstien
- Music by: Michael Tavera
- Production company: Walt Disney Pictures
- Distributed by: Buena Vista Home Video (Note: Distributed under the Walt Disney Home Video imprint.)
- Release date: March 18, 1997
- Running time: 74 minutes
- Country: United States
- Language: English
- Budget: $7 million

Honey, We Shrunk Ourselves is a 1997 American science fiction comedy film, and the third installment in the Honey, I Shrunk the Kids film series. The film marks the directorial debut of cinematographer Dean Cundey, who previously served as director of photography for a 4D ride known as Honey, I Shrunk the Audience! which debuted in 1994.

Rick Moranis stars as inventor Wayne Szalinski, and is the only returning cast member from the previous films. Eve Gordon replaces Marcia Strassman as Wayne's wife, Diane Szalinski. Their youngest son Adam, now a pre-teen, is played by Bug Hall. In the film, Wayne accidentally shrinks himself, his wife, and his brother (Stuart Pankin) and sister-in-law (Robin Bartlett) with his electromagnetic shrink ray. The film was Moranis' last live-action film role until Spaceballs: The New One in 2027.

It is the first live-action film by Walt Disney Pictures to be released direct-to-video. It was produced on a $7 million budget, and filming took place over a five-week period. The film was released through Walt Disney Home Video on March 18, 1997.

== Plot ==
Eight years after the events of the previous film, ten-year-old Adam Szalinski wants to go to baseball camp. His interest in sports seems almost alien to his father Wayne, although his mother Diane is more understanding. Meanwhile, their other children, 23-year-old Amy and 19-year-old Nick, are away at college. Wayne has started his own company, Szalinski Labs, with his brother, Gordon. One day, they receive tickets to witness a Space Shuttle landing, but Diane reminds him over the phone that he needs to watch Adam and his cousins, 13-year-old Jenny and 12-year-old Mitch, while she and Gordon's wife Patti go on vacation; she also reminds him to get rid of a Tiki Man sculpture they keep in the house because she sees it as an eyesore, but he considers it a good luck charm.

After Diane and Patti leave, Wayne and Gordon have activities planned; these activities bore the kids. Wayne sends them to the store, but reveals to Gordon that it is a ruse to get rid of them long enough so that he can use his shrinking machine in order to shrink the Tiki Man without Diane's knowledge, and spare any accidents with the kids. However, after carelessly not turning it off immediately after they succeed, Wayne and Gordon are shrunk when a billiard ball left on it falls onto the activating button, just as they are in front of it searching for the Tiki Man. Meanwhile, Patti realizes she forgot to leave Mitch's medicine for his potassium deficiency, and they head back. Hoping to catch Wayne and Gordon by surprise, they sneak up to the attic only to be shrunk when another billiard ball falls onto the activating button. Shortly after, the kids return home, and after hearing Wayne's previous message about the launch, assume they are alone for the evening. Jenny makes plans to have her friends come over. Upstairs, the adults make use of a fishing rod to lower themselves down into Adam's room. To attempt to get to the floor, they use his Hot Wheels race track, but they overshoot their target and fall down the laundry chute ending up in a clean load that is delivered back upstairs by Adam and Mitch. They tumble out of the laundry basket when it is overturned, and discover Adam and Mitch reading a Sports Illustrated Kids magazine, revealing to Wayne that Adam's interest is not in science as he hoped. The four suddenly encounter a cockroach, but manage to defeat it by luring it into a bug trap.

Seeing Mitch struggling, Patti realizes that they need to get him his medicine soon, or he could pass out. He ignores his weaknesses, though, and goes downstairs. The adults witness the arrival of Jenny's friends and decide to use a bubble machine in order to get downstairs. Diane and Patti land safely, but Wayne and Gordon fall into a bowl of onion dip and are nearly devoured by the girls.

In the kitchen, when Patti and Diane resolve to find a way up the counter in order to find Mitch's medicine, they encounter a daddy long-legs with its leg caught in a spider web. As Patti tries to cut the web with a nail file, Diane talks to the bug, realizing her own insecurities about being small and how hard it is to be that size; after it is freed, Patti and Diane hitch a ride by clinging to its silk as it climbs onto the counter.

Meanwhile, Wayne and Gordon decide to rewire the stereo to work as a microphone. A group of boys begin to crash the party, including Jenny's crush, Ricky King. He takes her into the kitchen and steals a kiss from her, but she spurns him for not asking permission first, thus earning Patti's respect. Angered, he returns to his friends and they begin to wreak havoc in the living room. Mitch, severely weakened, enters the kitchen and sees Patti and Diane on the counter, then faints from the shock and lack of medicine. Adam and Jenny discover him while Patti and Diane try and fail to push his medicine into view; thinking quickly, Adam gets potassium-rich bananas to feed to Mitch, and he begins to recover, weakly saying he had seen his mother. In the living room, Adam stands up to Ricky before Wayne rewires the stereo so that Gordon can talk and amplify his voice. With this, he pretends to be the voice of God and orders Ricky, his friends, and the other girls to leave, leading Adam, Mitch, and Jenny to realize what has happened.

In the attic, the kids briefly discuss the benefits of leaving their parents shrunk, but then decide to unshrink them and give them a chance to re-evaluate their parenting methods. Patti confirms her trust in Jenny, telling her how proud she is of her for standing up to Ricky and taking care of Mitch, while Wayne reassures Adam that he can have an interest in sports, and agrees to sign him up for baseball camp. Diane tells Wayne she will no longer sweat the "small" stuff and that he can keep the Tiki Man, while he decides to relinquish his presidency of Szalinski Labs to Gordon and return to inventing.

In the end, life is back to normal again. Adam returns home from baseball camp, Wayne has developed a new respect for baseball, and the Tiki Man has been moved into the backyard and enlarged to twice the height of the house.

== Cast ==
- Rick Moranis as Wayne Szalinski, Diane's husband, Gordon's younger brother and Patti's brother-in-law. He is the only returning actor from the other films in the franchise.
- Eve Gordon as Diane Szalinski, Wayne's wife and Gordon's sister-in-law
- Stuart Pankin as Gordon Szalinski, Wayne's older brother, Patti's husband and Diane's brother-in-law
- Robin Bartlett as Patricia "Patti" Szalinski, Gordon's wife, Wayne's sister-in-law and Diane's best friend
- Bug Hall as Adam Szalinski, Wayne and Diane's 10-year-old son and Gordon and Patti's nephew
- Allison Mack as Jennifer "Jenny" Szalinski, Gordon and Patti's 13-year-old teenage daughter and Wayne and Diane's niece
- Jake Richardson as Mitchell "Mitch" Szalinski, Gordon and Patti's 12-year-old son and Wayne and Diane's nephew
- Jojo Adams as Ricky King
- Mila Kunis as Jill, Jenny's friend
- Erica Luttrell as Jody, Jenny's friend
- Lisa Wilhoit as Holly, Jenny's friend
- Ashleigh Sterling as Corky, Jenny's friend
- Theodore Borders as Trey, Ricky's friend
- Bryson Aust as Vince, Ricky's friend

== Reception ==
Home video sales were successful in the first month of release, selling an estimated 1.5 million copies. However, critical reception was mostly negative. According to Rotten Tomatoes, the film has a score of 25%, based on eight reviews.

Dan Webster of The Spokesman-Review wrote that the film "has little of the quality boasted by" its predecessors. Conversely, Billboard called the story "fast enough for young viewers and interesting enough for adults," due to "a generous amount" of special effects. Bob McCabe of Empire rated it three stars out of five, writing, "Some of the effects are a bit ropey, but it keeps the energy up and the kids should still enjoy it." However, McCabe considered the plot to be derivative of the first two films. TV Guide also found it lacking originality, and wrote that the special effects "in general are excellent, but the vital sense of wonder is largely lost in the small-screen medium".

Film critic David Bleier, writing in TLA's 2000-2001 Film and Video Guide, rated it two stars out of four: "While mildly entertaining, the mediocre special effects and sappy plot dampen adult enjoyment."

== Future ==
In 2020, Moranis signed on to reprise his role in a sequel titled Shrunk, which would have marked his first live-action film role since Honey, We Shrunk Ourselves. The project was on hold as of 2023, and Moranis later returned to live-action for 2027's Spaceballs: The New One.

== See also ==
- List of films featuring miniature people
