= Amy O'Neill =

American actress

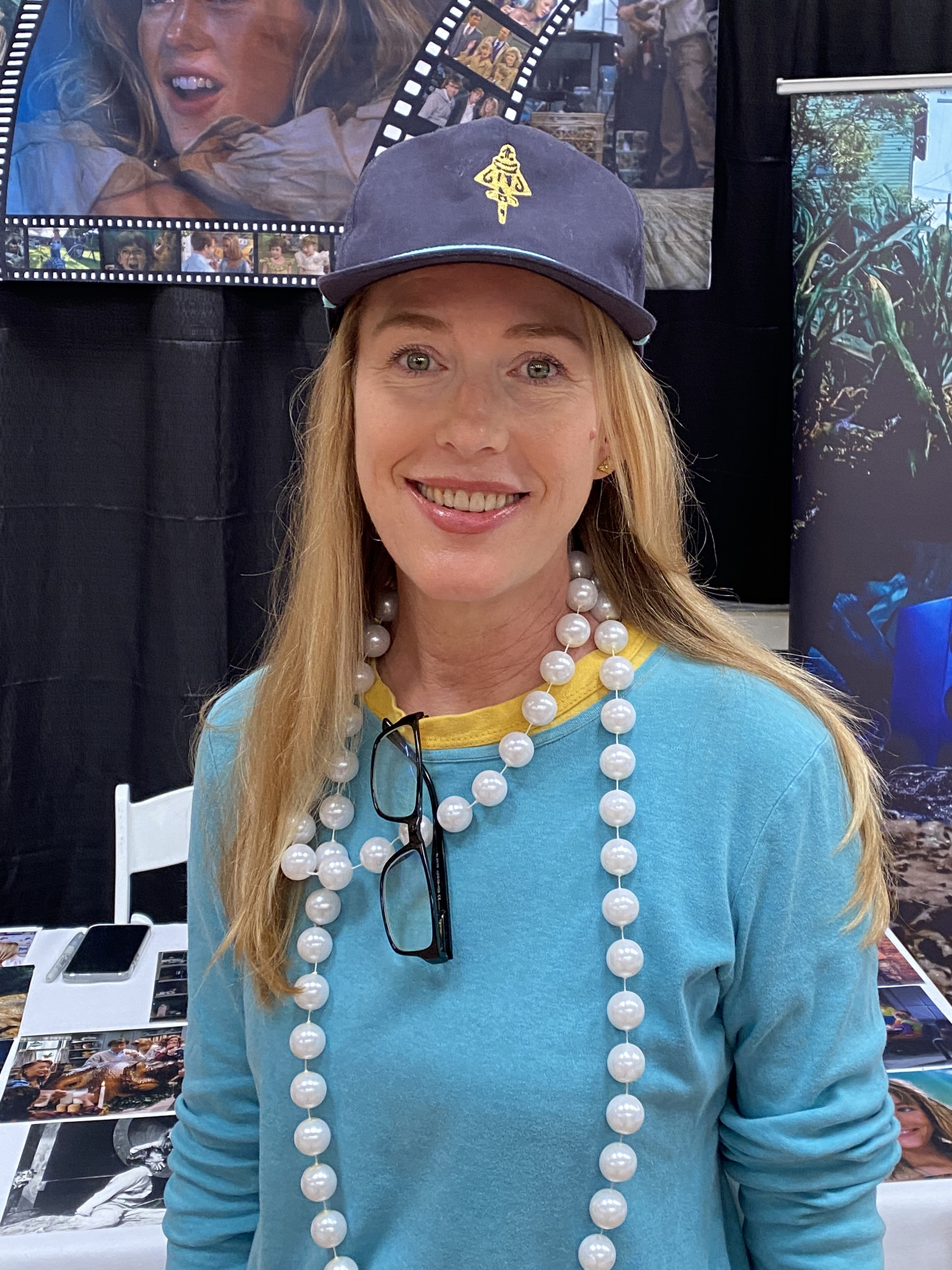
- O'Neill at Concord Mouse-Con in 2023
- Born: Pacific Palisades, California, U.S.
- Occupations: Actress, circus-style performer
- Years active: Acting: 1984–1994, 2008, 2016, 2019

Amy O'Neill is an American actress. Starting her career as a child actress in 1984, she appears in several sitcoms and is best known for her role as Molly Stark on The Young and the Restless in 1986 as well as high schooler Amy Szalinski in the 1989 Disney film Honey, I Shrunk the Kids and its 1992 sequel Honey, I Blew Up the Kid. In the 1990s she joined a circus-style entertainment troupe, appeared in documentaries about her childhood roles, and returned to acting with two short films and a television episode in the late 2010s.

== Early life ==
O'Neill was born in Pacific Palisades, California, the daughter of Virginia, an art school director, and Thomas O'Neill, a Los Angeles construction company owner.

== Career ==
O'Neill began auditioning for parts at age ten with her siblings. After her school session, they would drive out to Hollywood and make her first appearance on television at age 13 in an episode of Mama's Family as a younger version of Betty White's character, Ellen Harper. She continued working on television shows such as Matt Houston, Night Court, Highway to Heaven and The Twilight Zone. She also appeared on the American game show, Body Language in the summer of 1985. After an appearance on Family Ties, O'Neill further cast the role of the pregnant teenager Molly Stark on the daytime soap, The Young and the Restless for thirty episodes in 1986.

She appeared in the 1989 television films, Desperate for Love as Tammy Lauren's best friend, with Christian Slater and as Jodie in I Know My First Name is Steven, before appearing in her most recognized role as Amy Szalinski in Honey, I Shrunk the Kids. In the film, she and her brother are shrunk to 1/4 inch high by the father's (Rick Moranis) shrink ray. O'Neill had a role in an episode of Star Trek: The Next Generation, but most of her scenes were cut due to time constraints. She played Lisa Barnes in the unsold pilot Where's Rodney?, with Rodney Dangerfield and her Honey, I Shrunk the Kids co-star Jared Rushton. She continued working in television series such as Room for Romance, The Young Riders, and Gabriel's Fire, and starred as Susan Hartley in an episode of Murder, She Wrote.

O'Neill reprised the role of Amy Szalinski in the 1992 film Honey, I Blew Up the Kid, albeit only in the opening scene where she leaves for college. The reason for this is that the film was originally a standalone story unrelated to Honey, I Shrunk the Kids, and when the plot was changed to include the Szalinski family, there was no parallel character that O'Neill could replace. She later appeared in the television film, White Wolves: A Cry in the Wild II as Pandra, one of the young adults stuck in the Cascade Mountains, having to fend for themselves. In 1994, she appeared in the National Lampoon film, Attack of the 5 Ft. 2 In. Women as a "German Skater". She quit her acting career in the same year after getting scripts that required nudity.

She returned to television to appear in a 2005 Channel 4 documentary with her Honey, I Shrunk the Kids co-star Thomas Wilson Brown in The 100 Greatest Family Films. (Note: See Channel 4's 100 Greatest Family Films on IMDb.) In 2008, she appeared as an officer's wife in an independent film, The Japanese Sandman. In 2013, O'Neill was further working to produce a film tentatively titled Burn Down the Night, based on the 1982 book of the same name by Craig Strete, about the life of Jim Morrison before he joined The Doors.

== Personal life ==
After temporarily shifting from her regular acting career in the mid-1990s, Amy O'Neill is active in the performance art community of Los Angeles as one of the trio Girls on Stilts, a circus-style troupe. She once described circus learning as challenging and once resulted in a black eye facial injury, though she eventually later mastered the skills after several practices.

== Filmography ==
=== Films ===
Year	Film	Role	Notes
1989	Desperate for Love	Cindy	
1989	I Know My First Name Is Steven	Jody Edmondson	
1989	Honey, I Shrunk the Kids	Amy Szalinski	
1989	The Making of Honey, I Shrunk the Kids	Herself	Documentary short film
1992	Honey, I Blew Up the Kid	Amy Szalinski	cameo
1993	White Wolves: A Cry in the Wild II	Pandra	
1994	Attack of the 5 Ft. 2 In. Women	German Skater	
2005	The 100 Greatest Family Films	Herself	Documentary film
2008	The Japanese Sandman	Mom & Officer's Wife	Short film
2019	The Follower	Mom	Short film
2024	The Character Series: Amy Szalinski - Shrinking Good Fun	Herself	Documentary film

=== Television ===
Year	Title	Role	Notes
1984	Mama's Family	Young Ellen Harper	Episode: "Mama's Birthday"
1984	Matt Houston	Rosie	Episode: "Vanished"
1985	Night Court	Jenny Reader	Episode: "Walk, Don't Wheel"
1985	Highway to Heaven	Sue	Episode: "The Secret"
1985	The Twilight Zone	Blonde Girl	Episode: "The Shadow Man"
1986	Family Ties	Brenda	Episode: "The Disciple"
1986	The Young and the Restless	Molly Stark	30 Episodes
1987	Second Chance	Jane Pfeiffer	Episode: "Plain Jane"
1989	Star Trek: The Next Generation	Annette	Episode: "Evolution" (uncredited, scenes cut)
1990	Where's Rodney?	Lisa Barnes	Unsold pilot
1990	Room for Romance	Unknown	Episode: "A Midsummer Night's Reality"
1990	The Young Riders	Jennifer Tompkins	Episode: "Pride and Prejudice"
1991	Gabriel's Fire	Ginny	Episode: "The Great Waldo"
1991	Murder, She Wrote	Susan Hartley	Episode: "A Killing in Vegas"
2016	Baskets	Arlequin	Episode: "Picnic"
2020	Prop Culture	Herself	Episode: "Honey, I Shrunk the Kids"
