= Honey, I Blew Up the Kid =

1992 film by Randal Kleiser

- Theatrical release poster
- Directed by: Randal Kleiser
- Screenplay by: Garry Goodrow; Thom Eberhardt; Peter Elbling
- Story by: Garry Goodrow
- Based on: Honey, I Shrunk the Kids by: Stuart Gordon; Brian Yuzna; Ed Naha
- Produced by: Dawn Steel; Edward S. Feldman
- Starring: Rick Moranis; Marcia Strassman; Lloyd Bridges; Robert Oliveri
- Cinematography: John Hora
- Edited by: Michael A. Stevenson; Harry Hitner
- Music by: Bruce Broughton
- Production companies: Walt Disney Pictures; Touchwood Pacific Partners
- Distributed by: Buena Vista Pictures Distribution
- Release date: July 17, 1992
- Running time: 89 minutes
- Country: United States
- Language: English
- Budget: $32 million
- Box office: $96 million

Honey, I Blew Up the Kid is a 1992 American science fiction comedy film directed by Randal Kleiser and released by Walt Disney Pictures. It is the sequel to Honey, I Shrunk the Kids (1989) and the second installment of the Honey, I Shrunk the Kids film series. Rick Moranis, Marcia Strassman, Amy O'Neill, and Robert Oliveri return as the Szalinski family. In the film, the family's two-year-old son Adam is accidentally exposed to Wayne's new industrial-sized growth machine, which causes him to gradually grow to enormous size. Wayne's coworker, Dr. Charles Hendrickson, wants the giant Adam stopped at all costs, and wishes to take control of Wayne's invention. The franchise continued with a direct-to-home video sequel, a television series, and theme-park attractions.

== Plot ==
Three years after the events of the first film, inventor Wayne Szalinski has moved to Nevada with his wife Diane and their children. Their older son Nick is now a 14-year-old teenager, their 18-year-old daughter Amy is preparing to leave for college, and their younger son, Adam, is two years old. When Diane leaves with Amy to help her settle into her college dorm, Wayne and Nick are left in charge of Adam. The three of them go to Sterling Labs, where Wayne has constructed a version of his shrink ray machine which enlarges objects. He tests it on Adam's favorite toy, Big Bunny. When Wayne and Nick are distracted, Adam is zapped by the machine, which short-circuits and does not enlarge Big Bunny.

Back home, Adam and Big Bunny are exposed to electrical waves from the microwave oven and grow to a height of seven feet. Wayne and Nick take Adam back to the lab to reverse the growth process, but are kicked out by Wayne's colleague, Dr. Charles Hendrickson, who wants control of Wayne's invention. Diane returns home and joins Wayne and Nick as they struggle to prevent Adam from demolishing the house. In another attempt to shrink Adam back to normal size, Wayne and Diane retrieve Wayne's original shrink ray machine from a warehouse. Meanwhile, a girl named Mandy arrives to babysit Adam, but faints when she sees him. Nick, who has a crush on Mandy, ties up and gags her to prevent her from alerting the neighbors to Adam's condition. As Nick explains the situation to Mandy, Adam is exposed to the television's electrical waves and grows to fourteen feet before escaping through a wall.

Nick and Mandy search for Adam, but are taken into custody, while Adam is confined in a truck. Wayne and Diane return home to find Hendrickson and a US Marshal waiting for them. Hendrickson has summoned Clifford Sterling, the company chairman, hoping he will fire Wayne, but Sterling fires Hendrickson instead. Meanwhile, the truck carrying Adam passes by high-voltage power lines, causing him to grow to fifty feet. He escapes confinement and puts Nick and Mandy in his overalls pocket, mistaking them for toys. He then heads towards Las Vegas, pursued by his parents and the authorities. As Wayne and Sterling realize that exposure to the neon lights of the city will make him grow even larger, Hendrickson devises a plan to sedate Adam with tranquilizer cartridges.

Now over a hundred feet tall, Adam causes mass panic as he wanders through Las Vegas. Wayne attempts various plans such as attempting to put him to sleep with Big Bunny by helicopter, and the US Marshal attempting to lure him from the city with an ice cream truck, which all fail. Finally, Diane deduces he only recognizes items smaller than himself as toys, and he will behave if she was to be enlarged as well, before convincing Wayne to use the shrink ray to grow her to colossal size. Hendrickson arrives by helicopter and starts firing tranquilizer darts at Adam, who is carrying the neon guitar sign of a Hard Rock Cafe. The sign is hit by a dart and releases an electrical charge which causes Adam to cry, leaving the crowd pitying rather than fearing him. Hendrickson is stopped by a giant Diane, who then comforts Adam and holds him still while Wayne shrinks them both back to normal size. When Hendrickson arrives to reluctantly congratulate Wayne, Diane knocks him out with a punch for hurting Adam. Wayne and Diane then realize that Nick and Mandy are now tiny, since they were in Adam's pocket when he was shrunk. Wayne finds them, but gives them a few minutes of privacy since they are having a romantic moment.

== Cast ==
- Rick Moranis as Wayne Szalinski, a wacky inventor
- Marcia Strassman as Diane Szalinski, Wayne's wife
- Lloyd Bridges as Clifford Sterling, the president of Sterling Labs
- Robert Oliveri as Nick Szalinski, Wayne and Diane's teenage son
- John Shea as Dr. Charles Hendrickson, Wayne's avaricious colleague
- Keri Russell as Mandy Park, Adam's babysitter and Nick's love interest
- Ron Canada as U.S. Marshal Preston Brooks
- Amy O'Neill as Amy Szalinski, Wayne and Diane's college-bound daughter
- Daniel and Joshua Shalikar as Adam Szalinski, Wayne and Diane's two-year-old son
- Gregory Sierra as Terence Wheeler, a board member at Sterling Labs and an ally of Dr. Hendrickson
- Linda Carlson as Nosy Neighbor #1
- Julia Sweeney as Nosy Neighbor #2
- Michael Milhoan as Captain Ed Myerson, a helicopter pilot
- Leslie Neale as Constance Winters

== Production ==
The original film, Honey, I Shrunk the Kids (1989), was co-written by Stuart Gordon. Meanwhile, Garry Goodrow and Peter Elbling had written an unrelated script titled Big Baby. It was about a toddler who grew to giant size by a freak accident involving a growth ray and eventually terrorized Las Vegas. The story was inspired by the film The Amazing Colossal Man (1957). Gordon optioned Big Baby and pitched it to Disney along with the script that would become Honey, I Shrunk the Kids; Disney passed on Big Baby initially.

Honey, I Shrunk the Kids was a financial success, prompting Disney to register numerous names for a potential sequel. Gordon successfully pitched the Big Baby script to Disney as the basis for a sequel. Screenwriter Thom Eberhardt was hired to make revisions to Big Baby; a year and a half was spent reworking the script to feature the Szalinskis. A new climax set among Las Vegas' neon lights was also added, as opposed to a power plant in the original script. The project was retitled Honey, I Blew Up the Baby, before taking on the name Honey, I Blew Up the Kid.

Gordon turned down the chance to direct the film, believing he would have limited creative control under Disney, although he remained as executive producer and made suggestions on-set. Jeremiah Chechik was hired to direct, as Disney considered him ideal after seeing his previous film, National Lampoon's Christmas Vacation (1989). Dawn Steel, the former president of Columbia Pictures, was hired as producer, marking her debut in such a position. Disney removed Chechik from the project a few months into pre-production, out of concern that his ideas were too ambitious and costly. The studio was also concerned about Steel's lack of experience, hiring Edward Feldman to handle most of her on-set duties.

Randal Kleiser was hired as the new director, due to his prior experience with special effects while directing Disney's Flight of the Navigator (1986). He had also taken over directing responsibility on Disney's White Fang (1991), which demonstrated to the studio that he could bring a project in on time and budget.

The film's opening title animation was provided by Kurtz & Friends.

=== Casting ===
Rick Moranis, Marcia Strassman, Amy O'Neill, and Robert Oliveri reprised their respective roles from the original film: Wayne, Diane, Amy, and Nick Szalinski. Honey, I Blew Up the Kid marked the feature film debut of Keri Russell, who plays Mandy Park.

The film's casting director, Renée Rousselot, considered more than 1,000 small children for the role of Adam. She searched for three- to four-year-old boys because a younger child was expected to be problematic. When she came across the two-year-old twins Daniel and Joshua Shalikar in December 1990, she immediately cast them. It was rare for actors as young as them to be cast in such a large role.

Feldman said the twins were initially "undirectable", stating, "We couldn't get them to respond or smile or do anything." However, the film crew retained them, as a recasting would cost $2 million. A variety of methods were used to resolve the acting issue. The twins were allowed to do whatever they wanted on set, and were filmed the entire time in hopes of acquiring usable footage, some of it requiring script alterations to suit the material that was shot. Some scenes between Moranis and the twins were improvised. At the suggestion of the child psychologist Joann Smith, the film crew began staging faux birthday parties on set for various crewmembers. According to Smith, "If the boys think it's a party, they're more willing to work." Kleiser recalled, "You can't just tell a 2-year-old, 'Go stand on your mark.' They have to be tricked into doing everything. The amount of film we shot was astronomical. Danny was generally better at improvising and fresh reactions. Josh was better at following directions, so we would alternate."

Kleiser and a baby consultant would plan the twins' scenes several days in advance. One twin would act in the morning while the other was eating lunch or taking a nap. They were sometimes better-behaved and worked more efficiently while together on set. Effects producer Tom Smith said, "On his own, Dan was almost too adventuresome to repeat one move, and Josh seemed very cautious. Put them together and they could do anything." At the time of production, the twins were contracted for potential appearances in two more Honey films. However, the role was recast for the 1997 sequel Honey, We Shrunk Ourselves.

=== Filming and effects ===
Filming began on June 17, 1991, and concluded on October 10. The first filming location was in Simi Valley, California, for scenes involving the Szalinskis' house. Two replicas of the house were also built by production designer Leslie Dilley, one of them scaled down 43 percent for scenes where Adam has been enlarged. A significant filming location was Walt Disney Studios in Burbank, California. Wayne's laboratory was among the sets built at the Burbank facility. On-site filming also took place in Las Vegas, including the climax along Fremont Street, which was closed off for filming. A scene involving a water park – where Nick works and Mandy is introduced – was filmed at Wet 'n Wild, also in Las Vegas. The final shooting location was Orlando, with filming at Disney-MGM Studios. This was followed by a warehouse scene shot at the nearby Disney World merchandise distribution center.

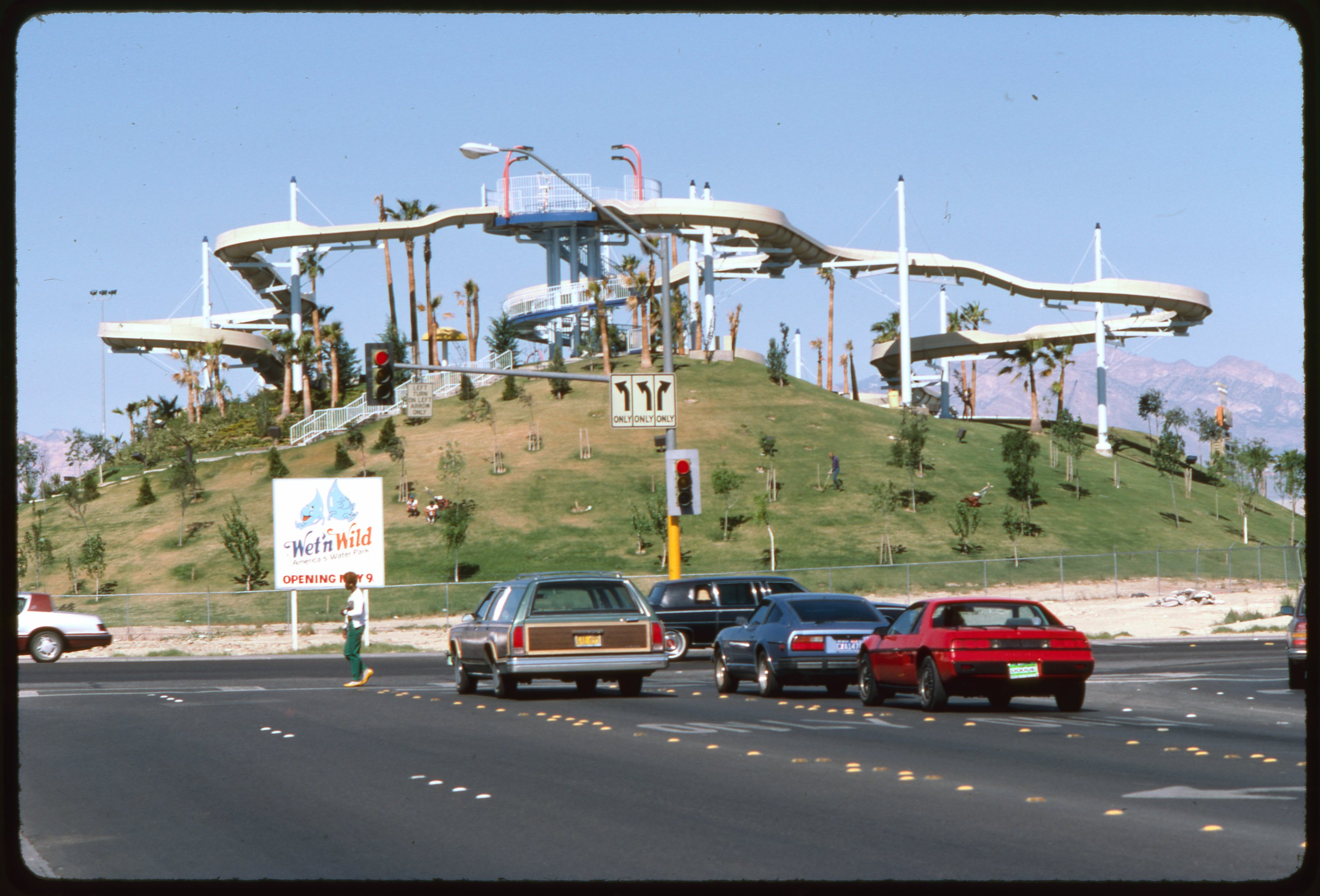
Wet 'n Wild (Las Vegas), where some of the filming for the movie was done

The film was produced on a $32 million budget, with $8 million going toward special and visual effects. Because Kleiser had only minimal experience with special effects, he relied heavily on Smith. The film was originally scheduled to release in March 1992, but this was pushed back several months to avoid rushing the digital compositing work. While post-production special effects were used heavily throughout the film, some effects were practical (shot on-set). When Adam knocks down his bedroom door, Dilley created a set with miniature furniture about four feet away from the camera, while the adult actors would be about fifteen feet away.

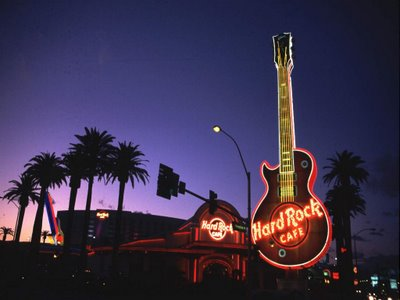
The film was shot in Las Vegas, Nevada where the Hard Rock Café sign is displayed.

Various props, created by Peter Chesney's Image Engineering, were used for giant Adam's rampage in Las Vegas. Among these was a 28-foot-high replica of Adam's chest, used for scenes involving Nick and Mandy in his oversized pocket. Other props included a pair of giant sneakers measuring 17 feet long, and a replica of the Vegas Vickie sign. A portion of this sequence also depicts giant Adam playing a neon guitar sign from a Hard Rock Cafe.

Stunt double Alex Daniels was used for scenes featuring seven-foot Adam, with an oversized puppet head worn to depict the character's face. Daniels studied videotapes of the twins to replicate their movements. The head was created by Kevin Yagher and was an early idea of Chechik's. Kleiser said "when we didn't light that baby head properly, it came across as a giant Chucky doll! Most of those shots worked by fluke." The hair on the puppet had to be dyed to match the twins, after their mother declined to have their own hair color modified.

=== Lawsuits ===
Disney was sued in 1991 by Paul Alter, the director of Family Feud, The Price is Right, and other well-known television game shows. Alter claimed to have come up with the idea of an oversized toddler after babysitting his granddaughter and watching her topple over building blocks. He wrote a film treatment titled Now, That's a Baby! Alter claimed there were several similarities between the film and his treatment, which consisted of the baby daughter of two scientists falling victim to a genetic experiment gone wrong instead of an enlarging ray. The case went to trial in 1993, with the jury finding in Alter's favor. Disney was forced to pay $300,000 in damages.

Author Kit Reed also filed a lawsuit, alleging similarities with her short story The Attack of the Giant Baby. The case was settled with Reed getting a "special recognition" credit.

== Release ==
=== Home media ===
The film was first released on VHS and LaserDisc on January 6, 1993. It was released on a bare-bones DVD in 2002.

== Reception ==
=== Box office ===
The film opened on July 17, 1992 in 2,492 theaters in the United States and Canada, almost twice as many as the first film. It opened at number one ahead of A League of Their Own on its opening weekend with $11 million. The film ultimately grossed a total of $58.7 million in the United States and Canada. Internationally it grossed $37 million for a worldwide total of $96 million.

=== Critical response ===
On Rotten Tomatoes, Honey, I Blew Up the Kid has an approval rating of 38% based on reviews from 21 critics, with an average rating of 4.80/10. On Metacritic the film has a score of 50 based on reviews from 14 critics, indicating "mixed or average" reviews. Audiences polled by CinemaScore gave the film an average grade of "B+" on an A+ to F scale.

Desson Howe of The Washington Post claimed that the film "feels narratively limited. It's a one-joke movie: Adam just gets bigger and bigger. All Moranis needs to do is get the shrinker from the last movie and turn it on Adam." Also from The Washington Post, Hal Hinson agreed that it was "a one-joke film" while also adding the film "squanders most of the comic opportunities its premise offers. As one-joke movies go, it's fairly inoffensive but also never better than mildly diverting." Roger Ebert, reviewing for the Chicago Sun-Times, criticized the weak story writing that there "may be, for all I know, comic possibilities in a giant kid, but this movie doesn't find them." He further concluded that the "special effects, on the other hand, are terrific, as they were in the first movie. The filmmakers are able to combine the giant baby and the "real world" in shots that seem convincing, and the image of the toddler walking down Glitter Gulch is state-of-the-art. Too bad the movie relies on special effects to carry the show, and doesn't bring much else to the party."

== Soundtrack ==
Honey, I Blew Up the Kid

Soundtrack album by Bruce Broughton
- Released: 1992, 2017 (expansion)
- Genre: Soundtrack
- Length: 39:57 (original) 69:34 (expansion)
- Label: Intrada Records
- Producer: Bruce Broughton

Intrada Records released the record in 1992, in time for the film's release. The score was composed and conducted by Bruce Broughton, who would return to provide the score for Honey, I Shrunk the Audience. "Stayin Alive" by the Bee Gees appears in it. So does "Loco-Motion" by Carole King, Gerry Goffin, and "Ours If We Want It" written by Tom Snow and Mark Mueller. The soundtrack album consists of just the score. In 2017, the label released an expanded edition included Broughton's score for Off His Rockers, the animated short that preceded the film in cinemas.

=== 1992 album ===
All music is composed by Bruce Broughton.

No.	Title	Length
1.	"Main Title"	3:03
2.	"To the Lab"	1:53
3.	"Adam Gets Zapped"	0:53
4.	"Putting on Weight?"	1:19
5.	"Macrowaved"	3:15
6.	"How'd She Take It?"	3:11
7.	"Sneaking Out"	1:12
8.	"Don't Touch That Switch!"	0:26
9.	"The Bunny Trick"	2:14
10.	"Get Big Bunny"	4:11
11.	"Clean the Streets"	3:00
12.	"Car Flight"	4:38
13.	"Ice Cream!"	3:47
14.	"Look at That Mother!"	2:26
15.	"That's All Folks!"	4:20
Total length:		39:57

=== 2017 album ===
Honey, I Blew Up the Kid (Expanded Original Soundtrack)
No.	Title	Length
1.	"Off His Rockers: Music From The Cartoon Short"	4:27
2.	"Main Title"	3:10
3.	"Meet The Szalinskis"	1:04
4.	"Just Like Your Dad"	1:36
5.	"To The Lab"	1:58
6.	"Us Guys"	1:02
7.	"Back To The Lab"	1:14
8.	"Adam Gets Zapped"	0:35
9.	"Putting On Weight?"	1:24
10.	"Macrowaved"	3:20
11.	"Hi Guys, I'm Home"	0:57
12.	"How'd She Take It?"	3:17
13.	"The Playpen"	1:10
14.	"Sneaking Out"	1:17
15.	"The Warehouse"	2:07
16.	"Don't Touch That Switch!"	0:26
17.	"He's Out And He's Bigger"	0:34
18.	"The Bunny Trick"	2:55
19.	"Truck Ride"	0:35
20.	"Hendrickson Gets Sacked"	0:46
21.	"Get Big Bunny"	4:18
22.	"No Naaap"	1:47
23.	"Clear The Streets!"	3:01
24.	"Car Flight"	4:43
25.	"Ice Cream!"	3:53
26.	"Look At That Mother!"	2:30
27.	"Diane Decks Hendrickson"	0:51
28.	"End Credits – That's All, Folks!"	4:25
29.	"Mandy?"	0:38
30.	"How Was Your Flight?"	0:14
31.	"Starting To Get Big"	0:17
32.	"Wayne Gets Fired"	0:22
33.	"It's Not A Morphis"	0:09
34.	"The Crate"	0:15
35.	"He's Headed For Vegas"	0:10
36.	"Adam Catches The Car"	0:20
37.	"Can't We Go Faster?"	0:20
38.	"Adam Cries"	0:15
39.	"Mandy's Room (Rock Source #2)"	1:36
40.	"T.V. Commercial Source"	0:17
41.	"End Credits – That's All, Folks! (Alternate)"	4:44
Total length:		69:34

== See also ==
- List of films set in Las Vegas
