= Eve Gordon =

American actress

- Other name: Eve Bennett-Gordon
- Education: Brown University (BA); Yale University (MFA)
- Occupation: Actress
- Years active: 1981–present
- Spouse: Todd Waring (m. 1987)
- Children: 2

Eve Gordon (also known as Eve Bennett-Gordon) is an American actress. Her television roles include playing Marilyn Monroe in the Emmy Award-winning miniseries A Woman Named Jackie, Congressional aide Jordan Miller in the short-lived sitcom The Powers That Be, the mother of the title character in the drama series Felicity, and Monica Klain, the wife of Ron Klain (played by Kevin Spacey) in the 2008 Emmy Award-winning HBO film Recount. She also starred in the 1997 film Honey, We Shrunk Ourselves, starring opposite Rick Moranis.

== Life and career ==
Gordon is the daughter of Mary (née McDougall), a history professor, and Richard Bennett Gordon, a lawyer. Gordon graduated from the Ellis School in Pittsburgh, Brown University, and Yale School of Drama.

She started her acting career in 1982, playing Marge Tallworth in the film The World According to Garp. After that, she appeared in ER, Come On Get Happy: The Partridge Family Story, Avalon and Honey, We Shrunk Ourselves (as Diane Szalinski, taking the role over from Marcia Strassman), and starred in David Chase's first original series, Almost Grown, and The Good Life with Drew Carey.

On the stage, she has starred on and off-Broadway, in Paris, Madrid, Chicago, Los Angeles, and many other cities, working with Peter Sellers, Richard Foreman, and Daniel Sullivan in classics, musicals, and comedies.

On November 14, 1987, Gordon married actor Todd Waring in Manhattan. They have two daughters.

== Filmography ==
Film
Year	Title	Role	Notes
1982	The World According to Garp	Marge Tallworth	
1990	Avalon	Dottie Kirk	
1991	Paradise	Rosemary Young	
1992	Leaving Normal	Emily Singer	
1997	Honey, We Shrunk Ourselves	Diane Szalinski	Direct-to-video
1998	I'll Be Home for Christmas	Carolyn	
2005	Miss Congeniality 2: Armed and Fabulous	Housewife #2	
2006	Thanks to Gravity	Mariella	
2006	The Grudge 2	Principal Dale	
2008	Public Interest	Karen Montgomery	
2009	Happy Tears	Karen	
2009	Versailles	Summer Tickler-Hoogenhyde	Short film
2011	Monkey Man		
2013	Chastity Bites	Principal Loveheart	
2016	The Tiger Hunter	Mrs. Womack	
2016	Ouija: Origin of Evil	Joan	
2017	Heartland	Sherri	
2017	The Circle	Senator Williamson	
2017	The Garage Sale	Merrin	
2020	Irresistible	Tonya Vanelton	

Television
Year	Title	Role	Notes
1981	Ryan's Hope	Mindy Peters	2 episodes
1986	George Washington II: The Forging of a Nation	Betsy Hamilton	Television film
1987	The Cosby Show	Glenda	Episode: "Planning Parenthood"
1988–89	Almost Grown	Suzie Long Foley	Main cast; 9 episodes
1990	Murphy Brown	Alexandra	Episode: "Frankly Speaking"
1991	The Whereabouts of Jenny	Theresa	Television film
1991	Switched at Birth	Darlena	Television film
1991	The Boys	Amanda	Television film
1991	A Woman Named Jackie	Marilyn Monroe	Miniseries; episode: "The Bouvier Years"
1992	The Secret Passion of Robert Clayton	Katherine	Television film
1992–93	The Powers That Be	Jordan Miller	Main cast; 21 episodes
1994	The Good Life	Maureen Bowman	Main cast; 13 episodes
1995	The Heidi Chronicles	Lisa	Television film
1995	Never Say Never: The Deidre Hall Story	Robin	Television film
1995	Dad, the Angel & Me	Maggie	Television film
1997	A Thousand Men and a Baby	Genevieve "Gen" Keenan	Television film
1998	Party of Five	Jeanie Hanson	Episode: "Of Human Bonding"
1998	Something So Right	Lorraine Hadley	Episode: "Something About Egg on Your Farce"
1998	The Practice	Janet Walsh	2 episodes
1998–2002	Felicity	Barbara Porter/Hunter	7 episodes
1999	Love Boat: The Next Wave	Ann Jenkin-Patrick	Episode: "Such Sweet Dreams"
1999	Come On Get Happy: The Partridge Family Story	Shirley Jones/Partridge	Television film
2001	Touched by an Angel	Erica Baker	Episode: "Bringer of Light"
2002	Family Affair	Jenny	Episode: "Pilot: Part 1"
2002	Judging Amy	Mrs. Powell	Episode: "Lost and Found"
2002-2008	Monk	Janie/Madge	2 episodes
2004	The Division	Ruth Ringston	Episode: "As I Was Going to St. Ives..."
2004	Veronica Mars	Emily Williams	Episode: "The Girl Next Door"
2005	Without a Trace	Marian Peterson	Episode: "Lost Time"
2007	House	Jody	Episode: "Resignation"
2007	Grey's Anatomy	Mary Chapman	Episode: "Let the Truth Sting"
2007	Cold Case	Melinda Levy (2007)	Episode: "Justice"
2008	Two and a Half Men	Brenda	Episode: "Meander to Your Dander"
2008	Recount	Monica Klain	Television film
2009	ER	Mrs. Nugent	Episode: "Love Is a Battlefield"
2009	The Philanthropist	Brenda Fitzsimmons	Episode: "San Diego"
2010	Ghost Whisperer	Mariah	Episode: "On Thin Ice"
2010	Glee	Mrs. Fretthold	Episode: "Laryngitis"
2011	NCIS	Amanda McCormick	Episode: "Restless"
2011	American Horror Story: Murder House	Dr. Hall	4 episodes
2011–12	Hart of Dixie	Delia Ann Lee	3 episodes
2012	Mad Men	Giselle	Episode: "Signal 30"
2012	The Newsroom	Phylis Greer	Episode: "Bullies"
2012	Necessary Roughness	Mrs. Brinks	Episode: "Might as Well Face It"
2012	Scandal	Janet Nystrom	Episode: "Beltway Unbuckled"
2012–2013	Don't Trust the B— in Apartment 23	Connie Colburn	10 episodes
2014	Supernatural	Joy Meyers	Episode: "Sharp Teeth"
2014	Mind Games	Diane	Episode: "Pet Rock"
2014	The McCarthys	Karen	Episode: "Love, McCarthys Style"
2015	Masters of Sex	Judith	2 episodes
2017	The Good Doctor	Nurse Fryday	2 episodes
2017	Longmire	Gloria Dodd	Episode: "Cowboy Bill"
2018	SEAL Team	Dr. Carpenter	Episode: "All That Matters"
2019	Doxxed	Grace Lo	2 episodes
2019	Big Little Lies	Dr. Danielle Cortland	3 episodes
2019	How to Get Away with Murder	ADA Gibson	Episode; "Do You Think I'm a Bad Man?"
2020	The Walking Dead	Celeste	Episode: "What We Become"
2020	S.W.A.T.	Jenny	Episode: Stigma
2024	Based on a True Story	Auctioneer	Episode: "Relapse"

=== Podcast ===
Podcast
Year	Title	Role	Notes
2021	The Zip Code Plays: Los Angeles	Aimee Semple McPherson	Voice; Episode: "90026: Echo Park - $10 and a Tambourine"
