= Good Time Harry =

- Created by: Steve Gordon
- Starring: Ted Bessell; Eugene Roche; Marcia Strassman; Steven Peterman
- Country of origin: United States
- Original language: English
- No. of seasons: 1
- No. of episodes: 7

Production
- Executive producers: Charles H. Joffe; Larry Brezner
- Running time: 30 minutes
- Production companies: Rollins-Joffe-Bessell; Universal Television

Original release
- Network: NBC
- Release: July 19 – September 13, 1980

Good Time Harry is an American sitcom that originally aired on NBC from July 19 to September 13, 1980.

== Plot ==
The series centered on Harry Jenkins, a sportswriter for the San Francisco Sentinel whose playboy escapades often got in the way of his work. Others seen were Jimmy Hughes, Harry's editor; Carol, another reporter; Martin, the copy boy; and Sally, Hughes's secretary.

== Cast ==
- Ted Bessell as Harry Jenkins
- Eugene Roche as Jimmy Hughes
- Marcia Strassman as Carol Younger
- Jesse Welles as Billie Howard
- Ruth Manning as Sally
- Steven Peterman as Martin Springer

== Episodes ==
No.	Title	Original release date
1 2	"Harry"	July 19, 1980
3	"The Wally Smith Story"	July 26, 1980
4	"Audrey Simpson"	July 26, 1980
5	"Play It Again, Stan"	August 2, 1980
6	"Harry Kisses Death on the Mouth"	August 30, 1980
7	"Ben Younger"	September 13, 1980
