= White Wolves: A Cry in the Wild II =

- Directed by: Catherine Cyran
- Written by: Catherine Cyran
- Produced by: Julie Corman
- Starring: Mark-Paul Gosselaar; Amy O'Neill; Ami Dolenz; David Moscow; Matt McCoy; Marc Riffon; Eric Drachman
- Cinematography: Richard Michalak
- Edited by: Glenn Garland
- Music by: Terry Plumeri
- Distributed by: Concorde Pictures
- Release date: February 3, 1993
- Running time: 90 minutes
- Country: United States
- Language: English

White Wolves: A Cry in the Wild II is a 1993 American adventure film directed and written by Catherine Cyran and starring Mark-Paul Gosselaar, Amy O'Neill, Ami Dolenz, David Moscow, Matt McCoy, Marc Riffon, and Eric Drachman. This film was shot in Oregon's Deschutes National Forest. It is the sequel to the 1990 film A Cry in the Wild.

== Plot ==
Five teenagers and a teacher go on a two-week trek through the Cascade Mountains. At first, they had a great time; making new friends and enjoying the wild. They then go to Eagle Rock where Mr. B (Matt McCoy) tells about his life in the woods, referring to the events of the first film. When they are on top of Eagle Rock, Mr. B falls in the woods, so the teenagers set off on a journey to find him. When they find him, they help him recover from the fall. It ends with the teenagers finding rescue helicopters and returning home safely. Only two of them had really seen the white wolf but never told Mr. B.

== Cast ==
- Mark-Paul Gosselaar as Scott James
- Amy O'Neill as Pandra Sampson
- Ami Dolenz as Cara Jones
- David Moscow as Adam
- Matt McCoy as Jake / Mr. B
- Marc Riffon as Benny
- Eric Drachman as Paramedic

== Reception ==
Review aggregator Rotten Tomatoes gives the film a rating of 0%, based on 0 reviews. Audiences give the film a 74% rating, based on 436 reviews, with an average rating of 3.9/5.

Producer Roger Corman cited this film's successful television premiere on Disney Channel and subsequent home video sales as driving his decision to make one third of his annual film output PG-rated, family-friendly projects.
