= Honey, I Shrunk the Audience! =

4D Disney film spin-off of Honey, I Shrunk the Kids

Honey, I Shrunk the Audience
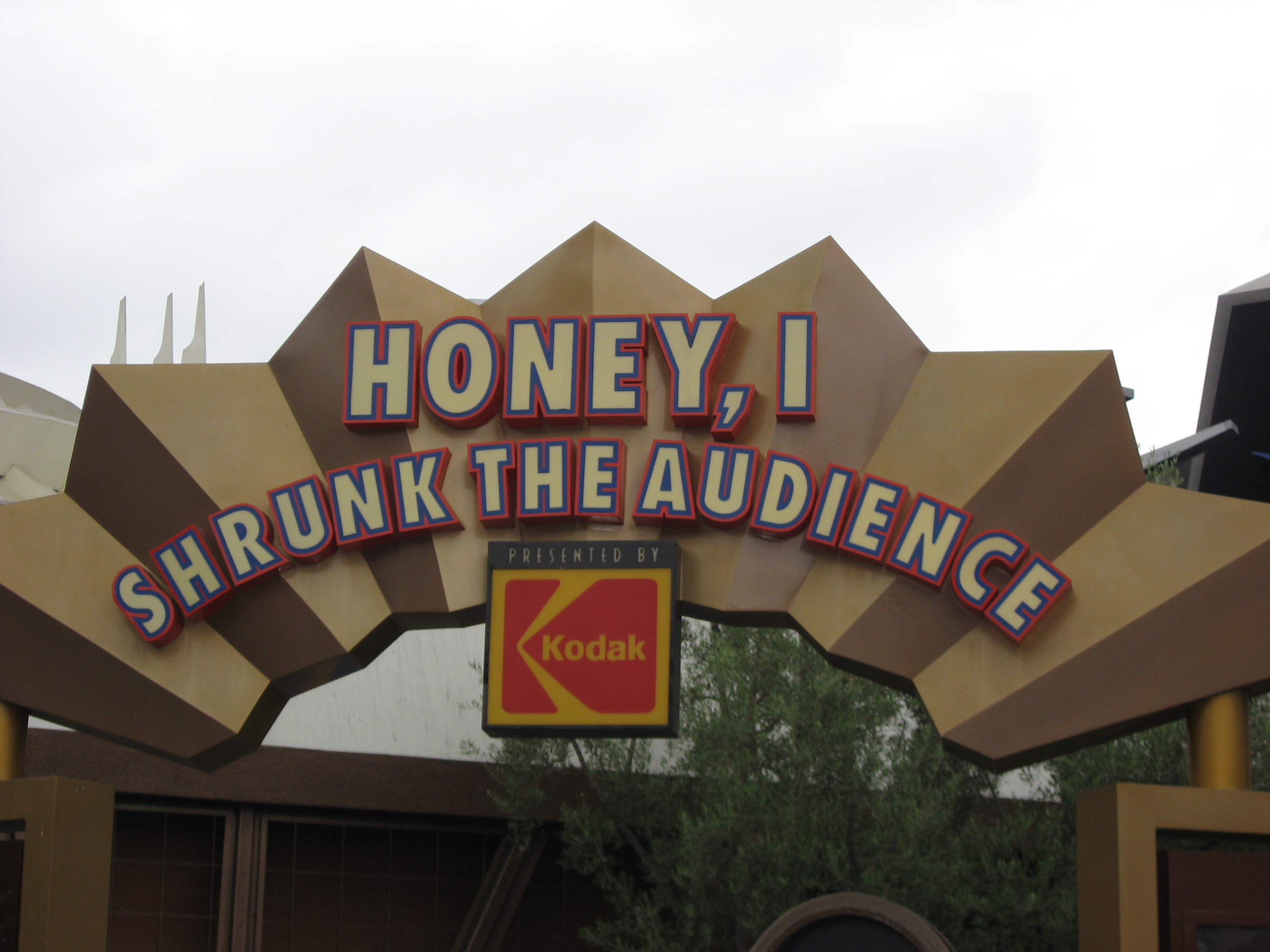
- The Attraction in Disneyland

Epcot
- Area: Future World, Journey Into Imagination Pavilion (1994-1998); Future World, Imagination! Pavilion (1999-2010)
- Coordinates: 28.3725°N 81.5515°W
- Status: Closed
- Opening date: November 21, 1994
- Closing date: May 9, 2010
- Replaced: Captain EO
- Replaced by: Captain EO Tribute

Disneyland
- Area: Tomorrowland
- Coordinates: 33.81145°N 117.91725°W
- Status: Closed
- Opening date: May 22, 1998
- Closing date: January 4, 2010
- Replaced: Captain EO
- Replaced by: Captain EO Tribute

Tokyo Disneyland
- Name: MicroAdventure!
- Area: Tomorrowland
- Coordinates: 35.6324°N 139.8791°E
- Status: Closed
- Opening date: April 15, 1997
- Closing date: May 10, 2010
- Replaced: Captain EO
- Replaced by: Captain EO Tribute

Disneyland Park (Paris)
- Name: Chérie, j'ai rétréci le public
- Area: Discoveryland
- Coordinates: 48.8748°N 2.7799°E
- Status: Closed
- Opening date: March 28, 1999
- Closing date: May 3, 2010
- Replaced: Captain EO
- Replaced by: Captain EO Tribute

Ride statistics
- Attraction type: 3D film with special effects
- Music: True Colors
- Duration: 23:00
- Disney's Fastpass was available
- Wheelchair accessible

Honey, I Shrunk the Audience (known as MicroAdventure! in Tokyo Disneyland) was a 4D film spin-off of the Honey, I Shrunk the Kids film series that was shown at several Disney theme parks. The audience wore 3D glasses, and the gimbal-mounted theater would shake and rock, creating the illusion of moving along with the characters in the film.

== History ==
In November 1993, Epcot announced that a new attraction themed after the Honey, I Shrunk the Kids movie franchise would be replacing Captain EO for the 1994 season. The new attraction would be called Honey, I Shrunk the Theater, a 3D film featuring special effects, such as vibrating chairs and water sprays. However, in February 1994, it was revealed that the name would be changed to Honey, I Shrunk the Audience. Captain EO closed on July 6, 1994, and work swiftly began on the new attraction. Honey, I Shrunk the Audience would open to the public on November 21, 1994. The attraction was an instant hit and met with positive reception from guests.

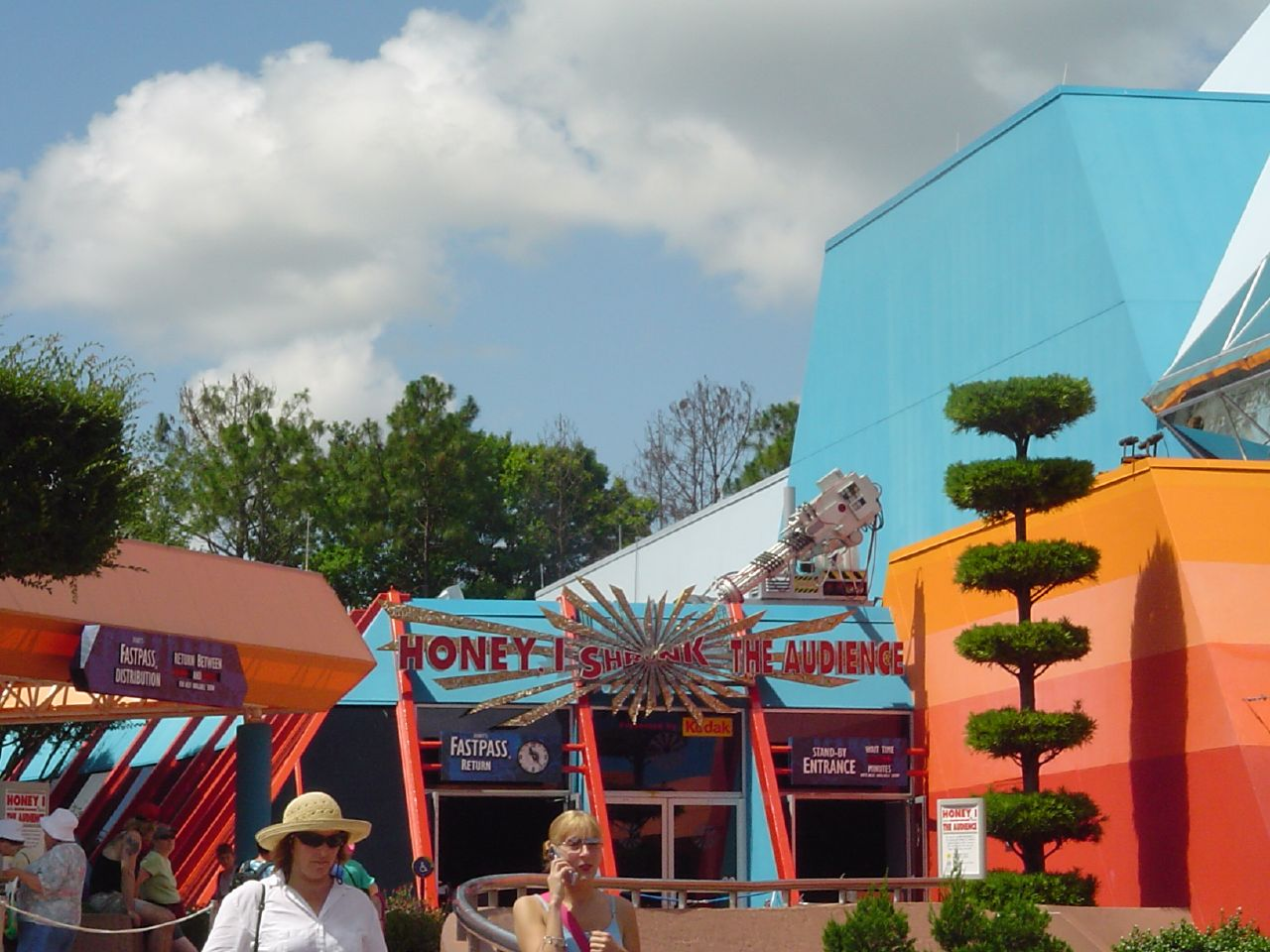
The Epcot location.

Following the success of Honey, I Shrunk the Audience at Epcot, other Disney resort locations followed suit. A similar installation at Tokyo Disneyland called MicroAdventure! opened on April 15, 1997. It replaced Captain EO, which closed on September 1, 1996.

In early 1996, Disneyland announced they had received their installation of Honey, I Shrunk The Audience. Like other locations, it replaced the park's Captain EO attraction that was set to close on April 7, 1997. Honey, I Shrunk the Audience officially opened at Disneyland on May 22, 1998, along with a remodeled Tomorrowland section of the park.

On March 28, 1999, Honey, I Shrunk the Audience opened at Disneyland Paris. The attraction replaced Captain EO, which closed on August 17, 1998. This location was also called Chérie, j'ai rétréci le public. The Epcot location received a new FASTPASS entrance a year later in 2000.

For the 2003 season, the attraction's pre-show was upgraded. This would involve replacing the original "True Colors" pre-show. The new version featured memory making and scenes covering the lives of families. These scenes included a child who could not find his dog and a frog causing mayhem on a wedding. Eric Idle would tell guests to follow the safety instructions at the end of the pre-show.

After Michael Jackson died on June 25, 2009, Captain EO regained popularity on social media. In September, the Disneyland location was temporarily closed to allow Michael Jackson's family to watch Captain EO on private screenings.

On December 18, 2009, it was announced that Captain EO would be coming back to Disneyland. This would mean that Honey, I Shrunk the Audience would be closing. The attraction would close at midnight on January 4, 2010. Honey, I Shrunk the Audience was stated to be closed temporarily for Captain EO, but it did not return. The Disneyland Paris location closed on May 3, 2010. This was followed by the Epcot location on May 9. Finally, the Tokyo Disneyland location closed for good on May 10. All four attractions were replaced by the Captain EO Tribute.

== Synopsis ==
Viewers enter the Imagination Institute's theater for the Inventor of the Year Award Ceremony, in which Professor Wayne Szalinski is receiving the award. The show opens with the crew of the show searching for Szalinski, when he flies on stage riding one of his inventions.

The Disneyland Paris location.

Wayne accidentally drops the control box, which sends him and the machine flying off behind the stage out of control. Then the show starts with Christie Smithers introducing the chairman of Imagination Institute, Dr. Nigel Channing. Dr. Channing welcomes the audience and introduces Szalinski. Szalinski returns, crashing into the "Inventor of the Year Award" sign over the audience. Channing attempts to introduce Diane Szalinski, Wayne's wife, but she says that she has to go and help find Wayne. Channing then introduces Wayne's sons, Nick and Adam.

Nick then demonstrates his father's Dimensional Duplicator, a copy machine, to kill time while the crew searches for him. Wayne's youngest son, Adam, puts his pet mouse in the copy machine, and the mouse quickly multiplies into hundreds of copies. The mice escape into the audience, running under their seats. To scare the mice away, Nick uses Wayne's Holo-Pet Generator, which first takes the form of a cat, which then transforms into a lion which swipes at the audience's faces. Shortly after, Wayne returns himself back to normal using the shrinking machine. He then attempts to use the device on a family's luggage.

The machine goes haywire and shrinks the audience, and Nick. Wayne inspects Nick and the audience and informs them that the machine has blown a fuse. Diane re-enters, searching for Nick. Upon spotting him, she faints and is dragged away.

Adam takes a flash photo of the audience before picking up the theater to show his mother. Diane and Dr. Channing urge Adam to put the theater back where he found it, and eventually he does. Adam's pet snake returns, lunging at the audience. He is shooed off by the Szalinskis's dog Quark.

Finally, Wayne fixes the machine and returns the audience and Nick back to normal size. Noticeably, Quark runs through the beam

Wayne accepts his award and begins his speech, but he is interrupted by Nick warning him. Diane then says, "Wayne, you didn't!" He then responds with, "Honey, I did! I blew up the dog!" The now-giant Quark walks out onto the stage and the curtain closes while viewers hear the Imagination Institute's crew trying to wrangle him. He then finds his way through the curtain and sneezes on the audience, closing the show. As the audience leaves, the commotion from backstage continue.

== Additional information ==
- The show was sponsored by Kodak.
- The film movie was directed by Randal Kleiser, who directed the franchise's 1992 release Honey, I Blew Up the Kid along with several classic films such as Grease, The Blue Lagoon, and Disney's Flight of the Navigator.
- The movie was presented in 3D by using polarized glasses and projectors.
- The entire audience was on a platform that moved up to four inches high during the presentation to simulate the theater moving and the floor shaking.
- The song "True Colors" was played as part of the original pre-show film as an advertisement for Kodak. In Disneyland & Epcot, the song is sung by various artists, one of which is Luther Vandross. In the Disneyland Paris version, it is sung by Cyndi Lauper.

== Cast and crew ==
=== Cast ===
- Rick Moranis as Wayne Szalinski
- Marcia Strassman as Diane Szalinski
- Robert Oliveri as Nick Szalinski
- Daniel & Joshua Shalikar as Adam Szalinski
- Eric Idle as Dr. Nigel Channing
- Katherine LaNasa as Reporter (pre-show)
- Meadow Sisto as Christie Smithers

=== Crew ===
- Directed by Randal Kleiser
- Written by Bill Prady, Steve Spiegel
- Produced by Thomas G. Smith
- Co-producer – Steven Keller
- Production designer – Leslie Dilley
- Director of photography – Dean Cundey
- Visual effects – Eric Brevig
- Original score – Bruce Broughton

== See also ==
- Epcot attraction and entertainment history
- List of former Disneyland attractions
- List of 3D films
