= Captain EO =

1986 short film by Francis Ford Coppola

- Theme park release poster
- Directed by: Francis Ford Coppola
- Written by: George Lucas; Rusty Lemorande; Francis Ford Coppola
- Produced by: Rusty Lemorande
- Starring: Michael Jackson; Anjelica Huston; Dick Shawn
- Cinematography: Peter Anderson
- Edited by: Lisa Fruchtman; Walter Murch
- Music by: James Horner
- Production company: Three DDD Productions
- Distributed by: The Walt Disney Company
- Release date: September 12, 1986 (Florida)
- Running time: 17 minutes
- Country: United States
- Language: English
- Budget: $23.7 million ($70 million in 2025 dollars) (Note: Cost of the film only)

Captain EO is a 1986 American 3D science fiction short film shown at several Disney theme parks from 1986 until 1998. It was directed by Francis Ford Coppola and stars Michael Jackson. The film was shown as part of an attraction with in-theater effects. The attraction returned to the Disney theme parks in 2010 as a tribute after Jackson's death the previous year. The film was shown for the final time at Epcot on December 6, 2015.

The film was a co-production between Walt Disney Studios and executive producer George Lucas, in collaboration with Walt Disney Imagineering. It was choreographed by Jeffrey Hornaday and Jackson, photographed by Peter Anderson, produced by Rusty Lemorande and written by Lemorande, Lucas and Coppola, from a story idea by the artists of Imagineering. Lemorande also initially designed and created two of the creatures, and was an editor of the film. The score was written by James Horner and featured two songs ("We Are Here to Change the World" and "Another Part of Me"), both written and performed by Jackson.

Cinematographer Vittorio Storaro was the lighting director during much of the principal photography. Captain EO is regarded as one of the first "4D" films (a 3D film that incorporates in-theater effects, such as lasers, smoke, etc., synchronized to the film).

== Plot ==
Captain EO and his ragtag crew are sent to a desolate world run by a witch known as the Supreme Leader to deliver a gift to her. Upon their arrival, the crew is captured and brought before the Supreme Leader, who sentences Captain EO to 100 years of torture in her deepest dungeon. Before he is sent away, Captain EO has his robot crew transform into musical instruments before he sings "We Are Here to Change the World", using his powers to change the guards into dancers. After defeating two Whip Warriors, he flies up to the Supreme Leader and transforms her into a beautiful woman, her lair into a peaceful Greek temple, and the planet into a paradise. A celebration breaks out to "Another Part of Me", as Captain EO and his crew triumphantly exit and fly off into space.

== Cast ==
- Michael Jackson as Captain EO
- Anjelica Huston as The Supreme Leader
- Dick Shawn as Commander Bog
- Tony Cox as Hooter
- Debbie Lee Carrington as Geek (Idy)
- Cindy Sorensen as Geek (Ody)
- Gary DePew as Major Domo
- Percy Rodriguez as The Narrator

== Production ==
Captain EO made full use of its 3D effects. The action on the screen extended into the audience, including asteroids, lasers, laser impacts, smoke effects, and starfields that filled the theater. These effects resulted in the seventeen-minute film costing an estimated $30 million to produce. At the time, it was the most expensive film ever produced on a per-minute basis, averaging out at $1.76 million per minute. Walt Disney Imagineering and Eastman Kodak used 70mm 3-D photography to shoot the film, which was completed in considerable secrecy at the request of Jackson and Lucas.

Captain EO began filming on July 15, 1985.

The 2010 version did not include the in-theater laser and starfield effects. It did utilize hydraulics previously used for Honey, I Shrunk the Audience! to make the seats shake along with Captain EO's spaceship, as well as LED flood-lighting, which was new to the theater. The hydraulics were also used for the bass-heavy musical numbers, and the seats bounced to the beat of Jackson's song. The hidden water sprayers from Honey, I Shrunk the Audience! were employed when Hooter sneezed, and that attraction's leg ticklers were also reused for the Supreme Leader's Whip Warriors.

== Music ==
The show's orchestral score was composed by James Horner, with additional score composed and performed by Tim Truman, while the area and pre-show music was written by Richard Bellis.

Two new songs appeared in the film: the first, "We Are Here to Change the World", was not officially released until 2004 as part of Michael Jackson: The Ultimate Collection, but this version was a shorter edit of the full-length song; the second was an early mix of "Another Part of Me", which appeared on Jackson's 1987 album Bad in remixed form and was subsequently released as a single.

Soul/R&B singer Deniece Williams covered "We Are Here to Change the World" on her As Good As It Gets album in 1988.

== Merchandising ==
Concurrent with the opening of the attraction, a behind-the-scenes documentary special titled Captain EO: Backstage was produced for television by MKD Productions. The piece was directed by Muffett Kaufman and was hosted by Whoopi Goldberg. It featured interviews with the cast, writers and director.

On September 20, 1986, NBC aired Captain EO's Grand Opening Ceremony. The show was hosted by Patrick Duffy and Justine Bateman and featured Starship performing "Sara" and "We Built This City". Belinda Carlisle and Robert Palmer also performed. George Lucas was interviewed. The special also showed the making of Captain EO with a lot of behind the scenes footage. There was also a parade.

The story was adapted as a comic book with art by Tom Yeates for Eclipse Comics, with stereoscopy effects by Ray Zone. Released in April 1987, Captain EO was #18 in Eclipse's 3-D series and was issued in two formats: regular sized, for distribution to the national network of comic book stores; and tabloid sized, sold at Disneyland as a souvenir. Yeates was contractually required to maintain the likenesses of the cards, and was given tightly-controlled slides of the film to work from. In 1989, Amazing Heroes named the comic the third best 3D comic of all time, praising Yeates' artwork.

Toys available included plush versions of Idey and Ody, Hooter, and the "Fuzzball" character. Other merchandise included trading cards, pins, keychains, a T-shirt of the film's logo, and a glow-in-the-dark T-shirt with the same three-color pattern painted across it that Captain EO wore in the film.

== Reception and legacy ==
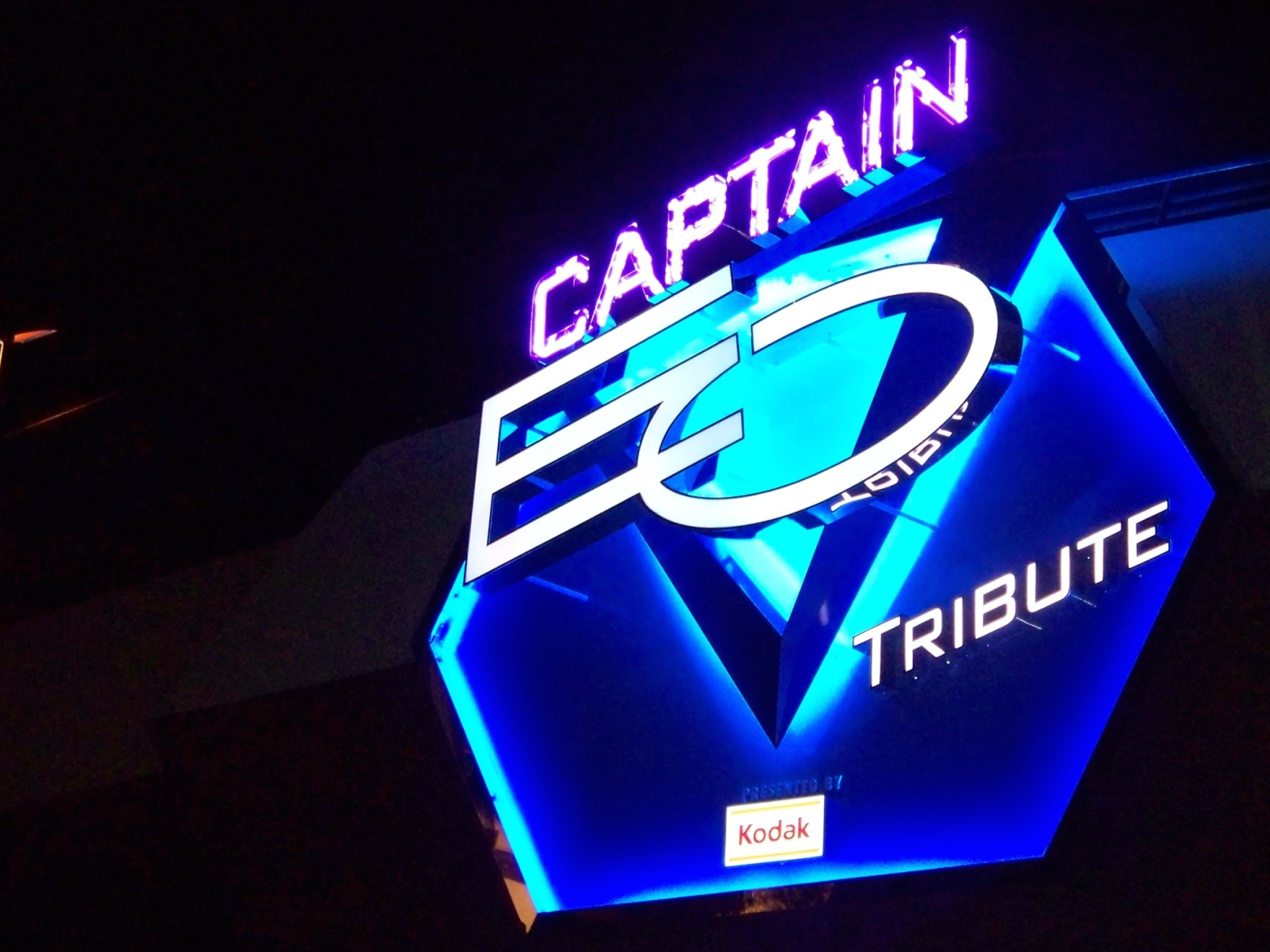
The Sign installed for the revival of Captain EO at Disneyland in 2010

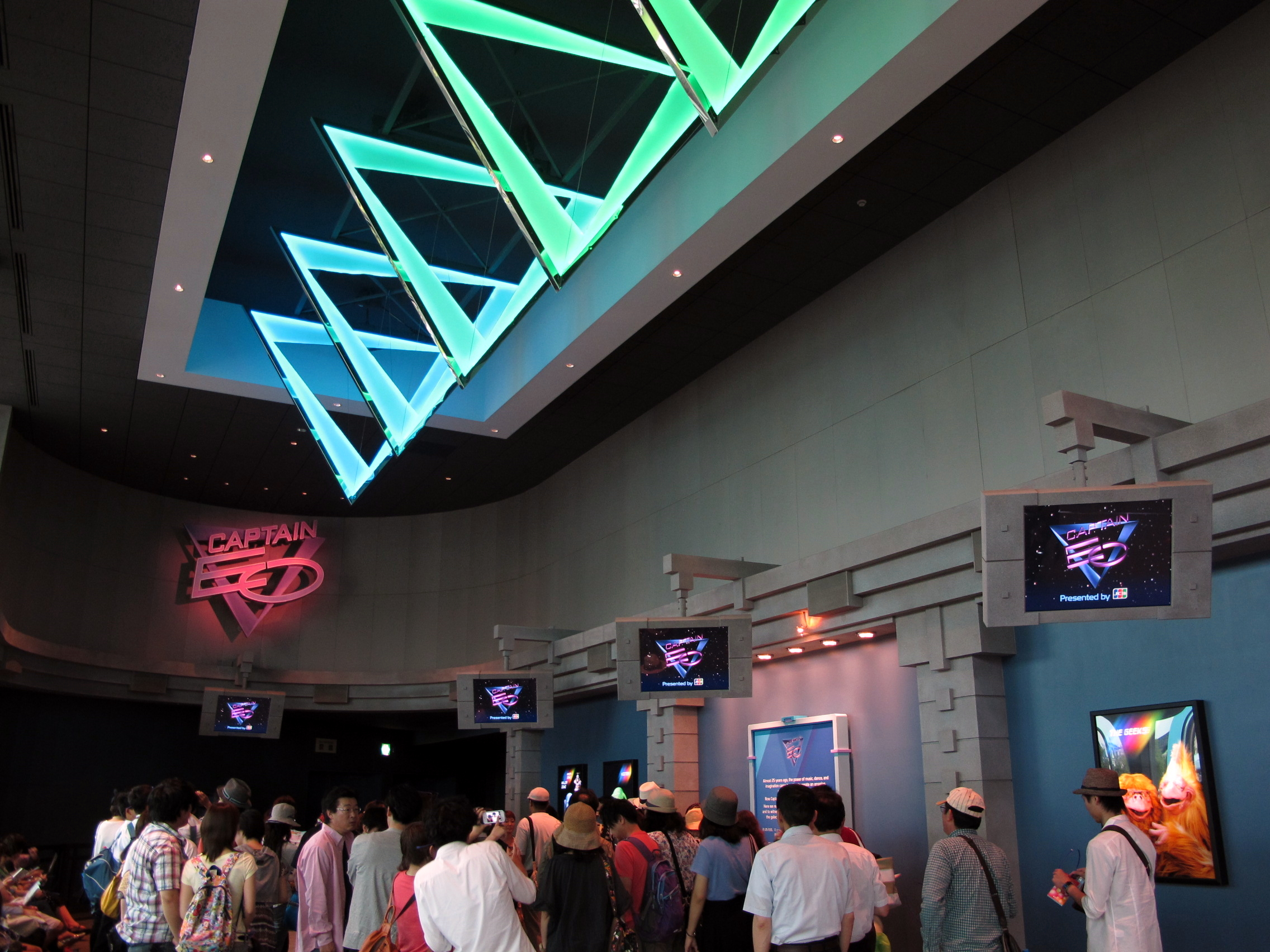
Captain EO waiting area at Tokyo Disneyland in 2013

In 1995, a decade after the attraction originally opened, Captain EO made its only television appearance on MTV, albeit in a down-converted 2-D version. It has not aired again since, nor has it officially been issued on home video, although bootleg videos exist.

After the death of Michael Jackson on June 25, 2009, Captain EO regained popularity on the Internet. For several years, a small group of fans had petitioned Disney to bring back the attraction and Jackson's death had brought this campaign to a peak. Soon afterward, Disney officials were seen in Disneyland at the Magic Eye Theater and reportedly held a private screening of Captain EO to determine if it could be shown again. On September 10, Disney CEO Bob Iger said, "There aren't plans to bring back Captain EO at this time ... We are looking at it. It's the kind of thing that, if we did it, would get a fair amount of attention and we'd want to make sure we do it right."

On December 18, 2009, Disney announced that Captain EO would return to Tomorrowland at Disneyland, beginning in February 2010. Social and Print Media Manager Heather Hust Rivera from Disneyland Resort confirmed this on the DisneyParks Blog and stated that Honey, I Shrunk the Audience! would be closing. That attraction hosted its final public showing in the Magic Eye Theater at midnight on January 4, 2010, to make way for Captain EO's return.

The attraction reopened at Disneyland on February 23, 2010 and subsequently returned to Discoveryland at Disneyland Park (Paris) on June 12, 2010, to Epcot at Walt Disney World on July 2, and to Tokyo Disneyland on July 1. At Epcot, the film had a "soft opening" (actual opening to the public prior to the official opening) on June 30, two days prior to its official reopening.

The attraction's return was billed as "Captain EO Tribute" to distinguish the presentation of the film from its original 1986–1997 run. The new presentation made use of existing in-theater special effects held over from Honey, I Shrunk the Audience!, but many of the original "4-D" effects—such as the enormous fiber-optic "starfield" wall, along with smoke and lasers—had been removed from the building at the show's first closing and were not returned for the revived presentation. The removed special effects from the original presentation are also missing in the Epcot, Tokyo Disneyland, and Disneyland Paris revivals that followed.

On December 19, 2013, Tokyo Disneyland announced it would be closing Captain EO on June 30, 2014, to make way for Stitch Encounter in spring 2015. Beginning July 4, 2014, the Magic Eye Theater at Disneyland was used to present a sneak peek of Marvel Studios' Guardians of the Galaxy originally with the expectation that Captain EO would return to the venue at a later date. Since then, the theater space was used for sneak previews of forthcoming films including Big Hero 6 and Tomorrowland with the venue itself later renamed the Tomorrowland Theater. The Tomorrowland Theater at Disneyland would also be used to present scenes from the Star Wars films as part of the park's "Season of the Force" event. On November 13, 2015, Disney announced that Captain EO would close at Epcot on December 6, 2015, to make way for a "Disney & Pixar Short Film Festival", which currently showcases, "Get a Horse!", "Piper", and "Feast". On May 22, 2026, The Tomorrowland Theater at Disneyland reopened to host "The Pixar Short Film Spotlight", which currently showcases "Luxo, Jr.", "Lou", and "Smash and Grab".

In 1987, a group of Disneyland cast members made an unofficial parody of the show using various Disney character outfits called Captain Eeyore. The parody was made overnight into the early morning hours and features criticism of the labor conditions of Disneyland.

=== Logo ===
In 1987, Electric Dreams Software began using a logo very similar to the one from Captain EO.

== See also ==
- 2014 in amusement parks
- List of 3D films
- List of Epcot attractions
- List of former Disneyland attractions
- List of most expensive films
- List of Tokyo Disneyland attractions
