= Robert Oliveri =

American former child actor (born 1978)

- Born: Robert Dane Oliveri; Los Angeles, California, U.S.
- Other name: Rob Meegan
- Occupation: Child actor
- Years active: 1987–1994

Robert Dane Oliveri is an American former child actor. He is best known for his portrayal of Nick Szalinski in the 1989 Disney film, Honey, I Shrunk the Kids, for which he was nominated for a Young Artist Award and a Saturn Award. He reprised the role in the 1992 sequel, Honey, I Blew Up the Kid and the 3D short film, Honey, I Shrunk the Audience! He is also known for playing Kevin, Kim's younger brother, in Tim Burton's Edward Scissorhands.

== Career ==
At age nine, Oliveri starred as Paul Bard in an episode of ABC Afterschool Special. Two years later he made a guest appearance on Friday the 13th: The Series as Mike Carlson. That same year, he starred as Young Nelson in the television movie, Ask Me Again. Also that year, he landed the role of Nick Szalinski, the son of Rick Moranis's character in Honey, I Shrunk the Kids.

For his performance, he was nominated for a Young Artist Award and a Saturn Award. In 1990, Oliveri starred as Danny Flocken in the pilot of The Flockens, a show about raising four boys, which also starred Miriam Flynn and Bruce McGill as the parents. The show was not picked up and dismissed. He starred in a 1990 episode of the TV series Monsters and then landed the role of Kevin in Edward Scissorhands with Johnny Depp and Winona Ryder.

He later starred in an episode of ABC Weekend Special as Ryan in Ralph S. Mouse. The next year, Oliveri reprised his role as Nick Szalinski in 1992's Honey, I Blew Up the Kid. His character had matured since the previous film and took a liking to Mandy Park, which was Keri Russell's film debut. Oliveri was asked to reprise his role as Szalinski again two years later for the 3D science fiction short film used in the Honey, I Shrunk the Audience! attraction, at several Disney theme parks, from 1994–2010.

== Filmography ==
Film
Year	Film	Role	Other notes
1989	Honey, I Shrunk the Kids	Nick Szalinski	
1990	Edward Scissorhands	Kevin Boggs	
1992	Honey, I Blew Up the Kid	Nick Szalinski	
1994	Honey, I Shrunk the Audience!	Nick Szalinski	
Television
Year	Film	Role	Other notes
1987	Square One Television	Unnamed child	Episode 102, "Your Map" segment, uncredited
1987	ABC Afterschool Special	Paul Bard	1 episode
1989	Ask Me Again	Young Nelson	1 episode
1989	Friday the 13th: The Series	Mike Carlson	1 episode
1989	Let's Get Mom	Danny	1 episode
1990	Monsters	Roy Barton	1 episode
1990	The Flockens	Danny Flocken	1 episode
1991	ABC Weekend Special	Ryan	1 episode
