= Shrink ray =

Fictitious device that can shrink objects

In science fiction, a shrink ray is any device which uses energy to reduce the physical size of matter. Many are also capable of enlarging items as well. A growth ray typically only has the ability to enlarge.

== Scientific plausibility ==
Atomic theory poses serious challenges and limitations to a hypothetical shrink ray. A shrink ray would either need to reduce the number of atoms in an object, or maintain the number intact and reduce atomic sizes instead. The first method would reduce the object's mass while maintaining its density, while shrinking the atoms themselves would keep mass unchanged but increase density. Science fiction writer and polymath Isaac Asimov wrote:

Miniaturization doesn't actually make sense unless you miniaturize the very atoms which build up matter. Otherwise a tiny brain in a human the size of an insect, composed of normal atoms, is composed of too few atoms for the miniaturized human to be any more intelligent than the insect. Also, miniaturizing atoms is impossible according to the rules of quantum mechanics.

Depending on how those atoms were supposed to have been miniaturized, a miniature human may or may not weigh as much as they originally did, which is an observation that has been used for various effects over the years in fictions such as comic books.

Even if quantum mechanics and neuroscience allowed for human miniaturization, problems would arise as geometry governs parameters such as relationships between cross-sectional area, volume, and surface area. It may be impossible for a one-inch (2.5 cm) high human to kill themselves in a fall of any conceivable height, but they may be able to drown themselves with a single drop of water.

== Appearances in popular culture ==
=== Films and television ===
- Dr. Cyclops from the 1940 horror film of the same name shrinks people victims by locking them inside an "atomic generator".
- In the 1958 movie Attack of the Puppet People, a scientist captures people and shrinks them to 6 inches in height with an ultrasonic wave device, so he can keep them as company.
- The 1966 science fiction film Fantastic Voyage is plotted around such a device, allowing the miniaturized submarine Proteus to carry a crew inside a stricken scientist in an attempt to save his life. They have one hour to cure him before they expand back to normal size.
- Dr. Shrinker is a segment that aired 16 episodes as part of The Krofft Supershow in 1976. Dr. Shrinker (Jay Robinson) is an evil scientist with a lab on an uncharted island. When teenagers Brad, B.J., and Gordie are stranded on the island, Dr. Shrinker subjects them to his shrinker machine. They manage to escape the lab in miniature form; the series follows their adventures as they try to evade the clutches of the mad scientist and return to their normal size.
- In the Teenage Mutant Ninja Turtles episode "The Big Break-In", Krang uses a remote-controlled shrink ray to shrink down US Army bases, preventing them from attacking the Technodrome. In the episode "Funny, They Shrunk Michelangelo", Talbot Breech uses a miniaturizing ray to shrink US naval ships and put them in bottles. In the episode "Poor Little Rich Turtle", Shredder uses a shrink ray on Buffy Shellhammer to coerce her into revealing a rocket fuel formula.
- In The Penguins of Madagascar episode "Jiggles", Kowalski uses his shrink ray to shrink Jiggles to normal size.
- In the Darkwing Duck episode "Getting Antsy", the villain Lilliput uses the ray to shrink buildings and landmarks of St. Canard and turn them into part of his golf course.
- In the Codename: Kids Next Door episode "Operation: M.I.N.I.G.O.L.F.", Rupert Putkin builds a shrink ray to shrink monuments and uses them in his miniature golf course. In the episode "Operation: S.P.R.O.U.T.", the members of Sector V shrink themselves to retrieve a Brussells sprout from inside Numbuh 4's body.
- In The Adventures of Jimmy Neutron: Boy Genius, one of Jimmy's most-used inventions is his shrink ray, first introduced in the pilot film Jimmy Neutron: Boy Genius.
- In Mars Attacks!, the Martian Leader uses a shrinking ray to shrink and crush General Decker.
- In "In the Belly of the Boss", the third segment of The Simpsons episode "Treehouse of Horror XV", the Simpson family is shrunk by Professor Frink, the entire segment being a parody of Fantastic Voyage.
- A shrink ray invented by Professor Wayne Szalinski is featured throughout the Honey, I Shrunk the Kids franchise, and is the primary invention used throughout.
- In the Captain Planet and the Planeteers episode "No Small Problem", Dr. Blight invents a shrinking ray which Sly Sludge uses to shrink rubbish.
- In an episode of Home Improvement, Tim and Al shrink themselves using shrink rays to work deep inside of the engine.
- In Doctor Who, the Master uses a Tissue Compression Eliminator to shrink and kill people.
- The Lilo & Stitch franchise has featured several instances of shrink rays:
  - In Lilo & Stitch: The Series, Dr. Jumba Jookiba has two different devices for altering the sizes of beings. In the episode "Poxy", he has a "reducer ray" that can shrink objects, with its effects being temporary; Lilo and Stitch are shrunken with this ray to enter Pleakley's body and retrieve Experiment 222 (Poxy). In the episode "Short Stuff", Jumba's "protoplasmic growth ray", which can permanently grow things (and also shrink them back to their original size), is used to grow Stitch, Experiment 297 (Shortstuff), and Experiment 625 (later named Reuben); Shortstuff remains enlarged after this episode.
  - Two episodes of the anime series Stitch!—"Shrink" and "Experiment-a-palooza"—feature Experiment 001 (Shrink), an experiment with the ability to shrink and grow others.
- In the Aqua Teen Hunger Force episode "Unremarkable Voyage", Frylock builds a shrink ray which can also enlarge items. Master Shake quickly gains control of the machine and abuses its power for his own benefit. The shrink ray turns out to be faulty, however, as shrunken items return to normal size after a period of time.
- A shrink ray is a recurring device shown in The Venture Bros., although it never seems to actually work properly.
- A shrink ray is a major plot element in Despicable Me. In the film, Gru uses it in order to shrink the Moon and pocket it. The effects of the shrink ray are only temporary, however, and the bigger the mass of an object, the quicker the effect wears off; this is called the "Nefario Principle" (coined after Gru's assistant Dr. Nefario).
- In Innerspace, a naval aviator is selected as a guinea pig to participate in a project which places him in a submersible pod to be shrunk to microscopic size and injected into the body of a rabbit.
- In the Gravity Falls episode "Little Dipper", Dipper Pines is teased by Mabel for being slightly shorter than her, so he creates a device that can grow and shrink others. The device falls into Gideon's hands until the twins stop Gideon from shrinking Grunkle Stan and taking the Mystery Shack.
- In Dragon Ball, a Micro Band invented by Bulma can shrink its wearer. Also, a portable home called a Capsule House can be carried around in a capsule and deployed when desired.
- In the Monsters vs. Aliens episode "The Sound of Fear", Dr. Cockroach uses a shrink gun to shrink Susan.
- In Phineas and Ferb, Dr. Doofenshmirtz created the Shrink-inator, a device with the ability to shrink others. Phineas and Ferb have also shrunk themselves twice.
- In the Barbie: Life in the Dreamhouse episode "The Shrinkerator", Ken builds a shrink ray and accidentally shrinks Barbie and Raquelle.
- In the WordGirl episode called "Shrinkin' in the Ray", Dr. Two-Brains uses a shrink ray to shrink cheese and shrinks Scoops and WordGirl.
- In The Electric Company episode "Shrink, Shrank, Shrunk", Manny uses a "shrinkinator" to shrink the water bottle and the car but accidentally shrinks Jessica, Marcus, and himself instead. In the end, they return to normal size.
- The Archer episode "Drastic Voyage", a parody of Fantastic Voyage, involves a CIA-developed machine which can perform "molecular miniaturization".
- In Mickey Mouse episode called "Down the Hatch", Mickey and Goofy get trapped inside Donald's body after they accidentally get shrunken down from a shrink ray to miniature proportions.
- In the episode "Incredible Shrinking Cat" from The Tom and Jerry Comedy Show, Tom and Jerry end up in a scientist's laboratory where they discover a shrink and growth ray, which is used on Tom.

=== Radio ===
- The "Pertwee System of Infinite Acceleration" in the Dimension X episode "The Professor Was a Thief" was a shrink ray (November 5, 1950).

=== Literature ===
- Cold War in a Country Garden (Lindsay Gutteridge, Pocket 1973) concerns the adventures of miniaturized spies.
- Small World (Tabitha King, 1982) is about a dollhouse enthusiast who gains a device that will shrink anything, and takes it too far.
- The Atom, Ant-Man, Wasp, Doll Man, and Shrinking Violet are comic book characters with shrinking as their primary power.

=== Video games ===
- Duke Nukem 3D and Duke Nukem Forever have a shrink ray capable of shrinking an enemy, which allows the player character Duke Nukem to step on the shrunken foe, instantly killing it. A similar weapon, the G.L.O.P.P. Ray, appears in Duke Nukem: Manhattan Project.
- Engineers in World of Warcraft are capable of crafting a Gnomish shrink ray.
- The Eiffel Tower is reduced in size, then stolen, in the game Evil Genius.
- In Men in Black: The Series – Crashdown, Agent J uses a shrink ray to shrink himself and battle a group of insectoid aliens.
- Pandemonium! features a shrink ray power-up.
- Call of Duty: Black Ops Zombie mode includes weapon called 31-79JGb215, which reduces zombies' size for a short amount of time so they can be instantly killed with any weapon, or even by running towards them, although this weapon is only seen in the map Shangri-La.
- The game Ratchet & Clank: Size Matters features a shrink ray item, which Ratchet uses to enter keyholes and unlock them.

=== Other ===
The term "grocery shrink ray" has been used to describe a manufacturer decreasing the amount of product in a package while keeping the package price the same, as a scheme to implement a hidden price increase.

== See also ==
- Raygun
- Size change in fiction
