= Jared Rushton =

American actor

- Born: Jared Michael Rushton; March 3, 1974 (age 52); Provo, Utah, US
- Occupation: Actor (former)
- Years active: 1986–2000

Jared Michael Rushton (born March 3, 1974) is an American former actor who is best known for his roles in several films from the late 1980s, including Honey, I Shrunk the Kids, Big, and Overboard. He has been nominated for two Saturn Awards and two Young Artist Awards, and is also known for his roles in Pet Sematary Two and as Chip on the sitcom Roseanne. Rushton also starred in A Cry in the Wild.

== Career ==
Rushton began his career at age twelve as Richie in an episode of Tales from the Darkside. He also appeared in another show, Cagney & Lacey, and a television film, Top Kids. In 1987, he played his first major role, as Kurt Russell's character's son in the film Overboard. The next year he starred in Lady in White as Donald, and as Tom Hanks's character's friend Billy in Big.

After the success of Big, Rushton appeared on an episode of Murder, She Wrote as Travis Harmon. He later appeared as Chip Lang, Becky's boyfriend on the television sitcom Roseanne for three episodes. After this, Rushton was cast as Ron Thompson in Honey, I Shrunk the Kids.

After finishing Honey, I Shrunk the Kids, Rushton appeared on an episode of Midnight Caller and filmed A Cry in the Wild as Brian Robeson, a film based on the book Hatchet. In 1992, Rushton guest-starred in an episode of Haunted Lives: True Ghost Stories. He also had a starring role in Pet Sematary Two, as the school bully, Clyde Parker, a main enemy of Edward Furlong's character. He also guest-starred in the Dr. Quinn, Medicine Woman episode entitled "Bad Water".

With the turn of the millennium, Rushton switched his professional focus to music. He has sung and/or played guitar with several bands, including Withdrawal, of which his brother, Ryan, is also a member.

== Filmography ==
Film
Year	Title	Role	Notes
1987	Overboard	Charlie Proffitt	
1988	Lady in White	Donald	
1988	Big	Billy Francis Kopecki	
1989	Honey, I Shrunk the Kids	Ron Thompson	
1990	A Cry in the Wild	Brian Robeson	
1992	Pet Sematary Two	Clyde Parker	

Television
Year	Title	Role	Notes
1986	Tales from the Darkside	Richie	Season 3, episode 8
1986	Cagney & Lacey	Peter Wade	Season 6, episode 7
1987	Top Kids	Peter	TV movie
1988	Murder, She Wrote	Travis Harmon	Season 5, episode 5
1988–89	Roseanne	Chip Lang	Season 1, episodes 6, 9 & 17
1990	Midnight Caller	Sylver Jensen	Season 2, episode 12
1990	...Where's Rodney?	Rodney Barnes	Pilot (not picked up)
1991–92	Haunted Lives: True Ghost Stories	Steve Johnson	Miniseries (2 episodes)
1992	Camp Wilder	David	Season 1, episode 3
1992	Life Goes On	Ziggy	Season 4, episode 7
1993	Dr. Quinn, Medicine Woman	Calvin Harding	Season 1, episode 6
1993	CBS Schoolbreak Special	Alex Raymond	Season 11, episode 1
1993	Northern Exposure	Phil	Season 5, episode 8
1994	The Yarn Princess	Peter Thomas	TV movie
1994	ER	Andy Bohlmeyer	Season 1, episode 9
1996	Dead Man's Walk	Wesley Buttons	Miniseries (3 episodes)
1999	Fitz	Bill Lane	Season 1, episode 13
2000	Cover Me	Seth Kesseling	Season 1, episode 2

Self appearances
Year	Title	Role	Notes
1989	The Making of Honey, I Shrunk the Kids	Himself	Video
1994	ER / ER Confidential	Andy Bohlmeyer	Season 1, episode 9
2007	Big: Chemistry of a Classic	Himself	Video
2020	Prop Culture	Himself	Season 1, episode 5

== Award nominations ==
Year	Award	Category	Nominated work	Result	Ref.
1990	Saturn Awards	Best Performance by a Younger Actor	Big	Nominated	
1991	Saturn Awards	Best Performance by a Younger Actor	Honey, I Shrunk the Kids	Nominated	
1989	Young Artist Award	Best Young Actor in a Motion Picture: Comedy or Fantasy	Big	Nominated	
1989	Young Artist Award	Best Young Actor/Actress in a Film Made for Video	Kidsongs	Nominated	
1990	Young Artist Award	Best Young Actor Starring in a Motion Picture	Honey, I Shrunk the Kids	Nominated	
1991	Young Artist Award	Best Young Actor Starring in a Cable Special	A Cry in the Wild	Nominated	
