= Marcia Strassman =

American actress and singer (1948–2014)

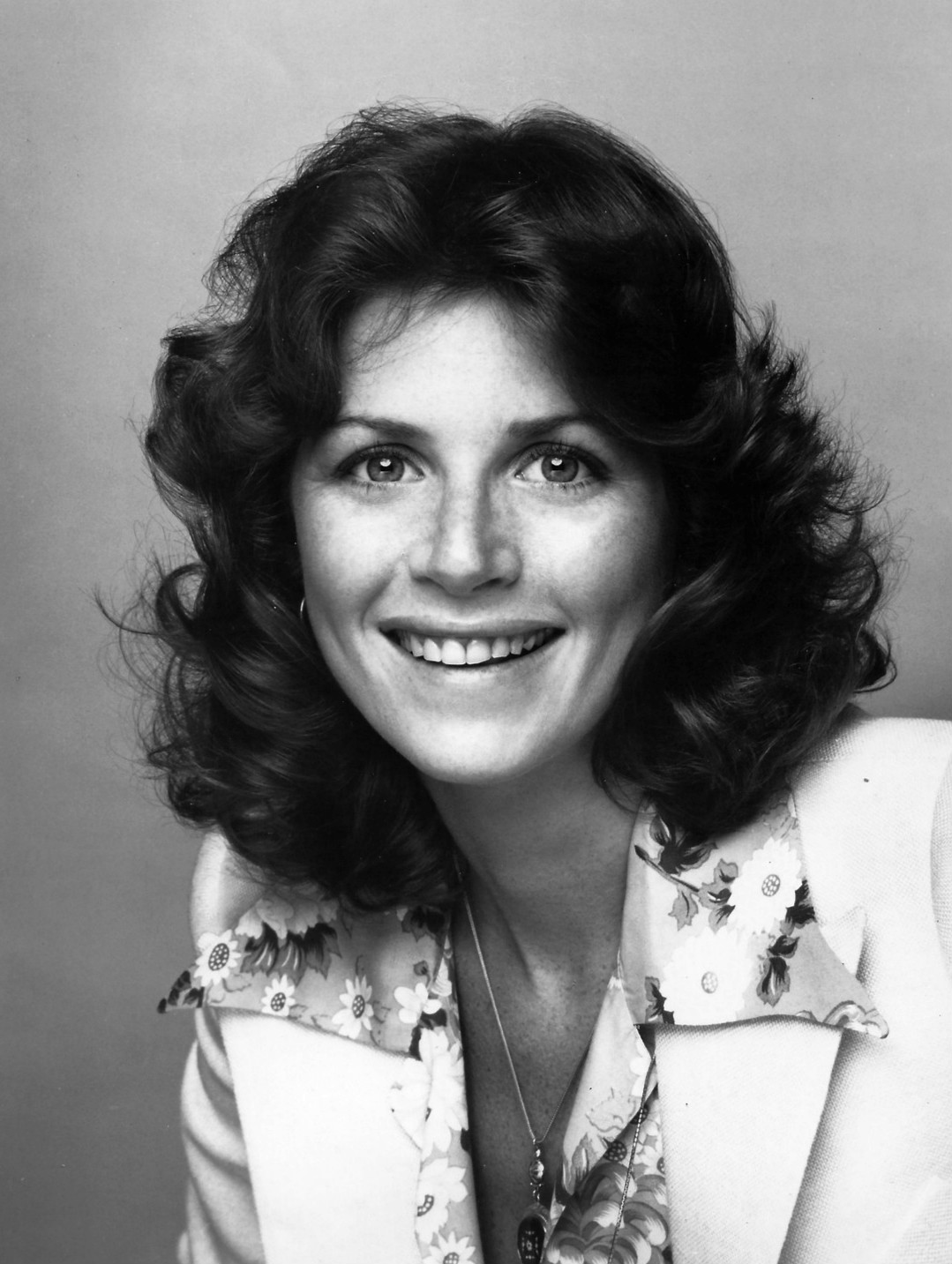
- Strassman in 1975
- Born: Marcia Ann Strassman; April 28, 1948; New York City, U.S.
- Died: October 24, 2014 (aged 66); Sherman Oaks, California, U.S.
- Occupations: Actress; singer
- Years active: 1963–2014
- Known for: Welcome Back, Kotter; Honey, I Shrunk the Kids; Honey, I Blew Up the Kid; M*A*S*H
- Spouse: Robert Collector (m. 1984; div. 1989)
- Children: 1

Marcia Ann Strassman (April 28, 1948 – October 24, 2014) was an American actress and singer. She had roles on the TV programs Welcome Back, Kotter and M*A*S*H, as well as in the film Honey, I Shrunk the Kids and the sequel Honey, I Blew Up the Kid.

== Life and career ==
Strassman succeeded Liza Minnelli in the role of Ethel Hofflinger in the Off-Broadway musical Best Foot Forward.

In 1967, she became a recording artist for Uni Records. Her debut single, "The Flower Children", was a top-40 hit in many West Coast U.S. markets, hitting #4 in San Diego and #2 in San Francisco; the track also hit #3 in Vancouver, British Columbia (both at CKLG 730 AM and CFUN 1410 AM in July 1967). However, the single failed to break out nationally in either country; the record stalled at #105 in the United States, and just sneaked into RPM's Top 100 for Canada, peaking at #95. The song also reached #95 on Cashbox Top 100 Singles chart

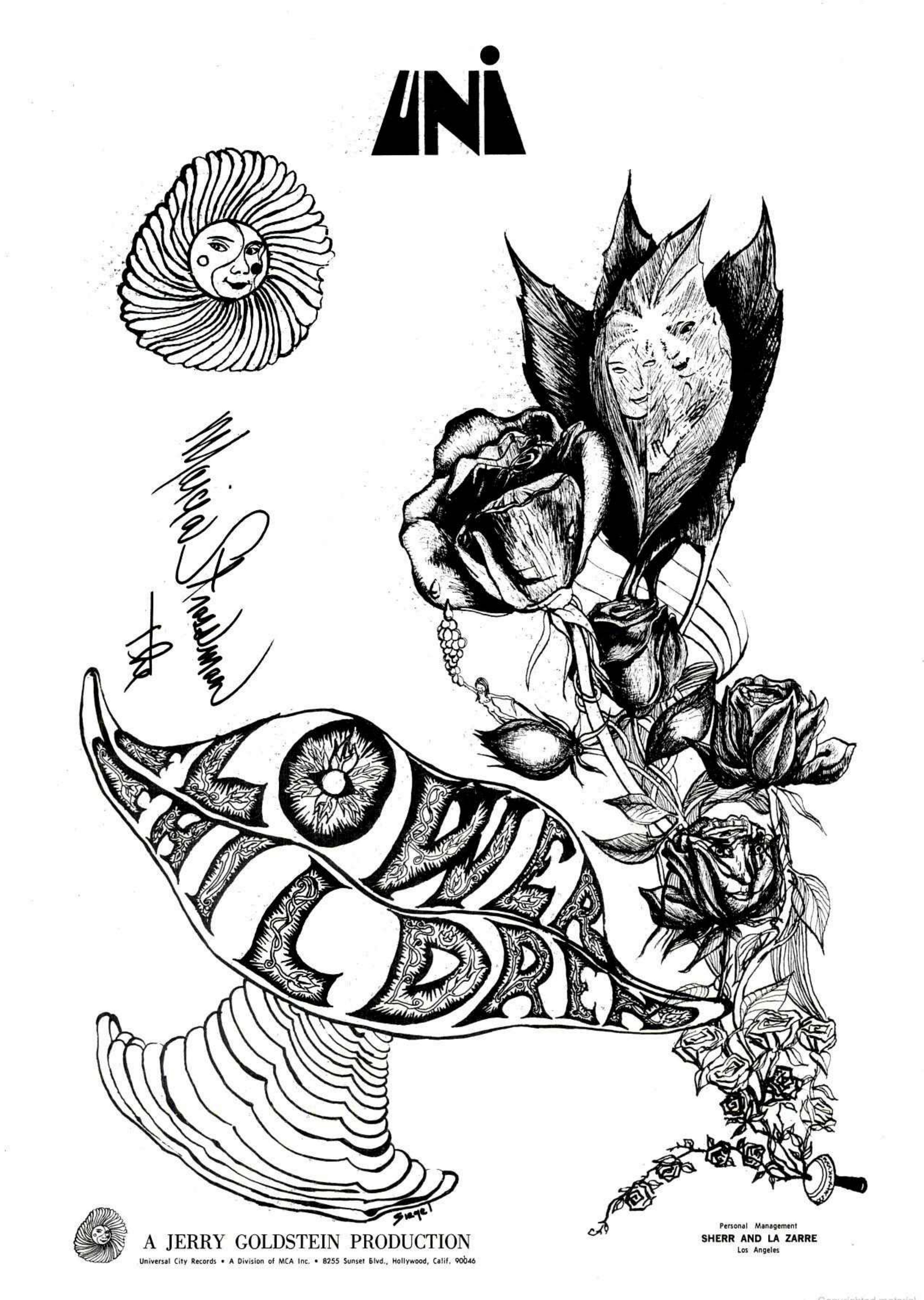
Billboard advertisement for "The Flower Children", 1 April 1967

Her follow-up release, "The Groovy World of Jack and Jill", charted in Denver, Colorado, but virtually nowhere else. A third single, "Star Gazer" (1968) (produced by Kim Fowley), failed to chart anywhere and brought Strassman's brief recording career to a close. Returning to acting after a gap of a few years, she landed the recurring role of Nurse Margie Cutler in six early episodes of M*A*S*H

She landed the role of Julie Kotter, the wife of title character high school teacher Gabe Kotter (Gabe Kaplan) on the ABC comedy series Welcome Back, Kotter in 1975. The series lasted four years. Strassman was told that Kaplan wanted her off the series, and stated in an interview that working on the series made her "miserable". Kaplan read the interview and realized that series producer James Komack was separately telling the two actors that they didn't like each other, and Kaplan informed Strassman that he actually wanted more balance between Kotter's work and home environments, which would have afforded her the chance to do more on the series. Kaplan, a guest host on The Tonight Show that week, had Strassman on to tell the story as an interview guest; she recalled the incident decades later on a Biography Channel special about the history of Kotter.

In the 1970s, Strassman did guest spots on Time Express, The Rockford Files, and The Love Boat, among other shows. In 1980, she starred as Lenina Crowne in a television production of Aldous Huxley's Brave New World. She co-starred in the short-lived sitcom Good Time Harry that year. She guest-starred on the Magnum, P.I. episode "Heal Thyself", where she played Dr. Karen Harmon, a former nurse with whom the title character served in Vietnam. In 1982, she played Maria Giannin in the romantic comedy Soup for One.

In 1989–90, she had a co-starring role on the 21 Jump Street spin-off, Booker, starring Richard Grieco in the title role. She guest starred on Murder, She Wrote in 1996. Strassman had movie roles as Rick Moranis's wife in Honey, I Shrunk the Kids (1989) and Honey, I Blew Up the Kid (1992). In 1994, she reprised her role from those movies in the 3-D film spin-off Honey, I Shrunk the Audience! She later went on to play Nancy Sterngood on the television series Tremors (2003).

== Death ==
In March 2007, Strassman was diagnosed with advanced breast cancer that had spread to her bones, severely impeding her ability to act on camera. Her memoir, in which she discussed her life, career, and illness, was published in 2008. Strassman died of the disease at her home in Sherman Oaks, California, on October 24, 2014. She was 66 years old. She had a daughter, Elizabeth Collector (from her 1984 to 1989 marriage to Robert Collector).

== Filmography ==
=== Film ===
| Year | Title | Role | Notes |
|---|---|---|---|
| 1969 | Changes | Kristine | |
| 1982 | Soup for One | Maria Giannini | |
| 1985 | The Aviator | Rose Stiller | |
| 1989 | Honey, I Shrunk the Kids | Diane Szalinski | |
| 1991 | Fast Getaway | Lorraine | |
| 1991 | And You Thought Your Parents Were Weird | Sarah Carson | |
| 1992 | Honey, I Blew Up the Kid | Diane Szalinski | Nominated — Saturn Award for Best Supporting Actress |
| 1993 | Another Stakeout | Pam O'Hara | |
| 1994 | Honey, I Shrunk the Audience! | Diane Szalinski | Short film |
| 1995 | Cops n Roberts | | |
| 1996 | Earth Minus Zero | Debbie Heller | |
| 2002 | Gale Force | Kim Nelson | |
| 2003 | The Movie Hero | Mrs. Gardner | |
| 2003 | Power Play | Susan Breecher | |
| 2005 | Reeker | Rose Tuckey | |

=== Television ===
| Year | Title | Role | Notes |
|---|---|---|---|
| 1964–1965 | The Patty Duke Show | Adeline / Gladys / Model | 3 episodes |
| 1967 | Ironside | Samantha Dain | Episode: "The Man Who Believed" |
| 1972 | Wednesday Night Out | | Television movie |
| 1972–1973 | M*A*S*H | Nurse Margie Cutler | 6 episodes |
| 1973 | Love Story | | Episode: "Mirabelle's Summer" |
| 1974 | Police Story | Jacqueline | Episode: "The Ripper" |
| 1974 | Marcus Welby, M.D. | Julie Sellers | Episode: "The Latch-Key Child" |
| 1975 | Journey from Darkness | Nancy | Television movie |
| 1975–1979 | Welcome Back, Kotter | Julie Kotter | 94 episodes |
| 1976 | City of Angels | Marge Carruthers | Episode: "The Losers" |
| 1976 | Brenda Starr | Kentucky Smith | Television movie |
| 1977 | The Love Boat II | Pat McFarland | Television movie |
| 1978 | The Love Boat | Stephanie Lewis | Episode: "Last of the Stubings/Million Dollar Man/The Sisters" |
| 1978 | Fantasy Island | Kay Penny / Katherine Patrino | Episode: "The Funny Girl/Butch and Sundance" |
| 1979 | Time Express | Sara Mason | Episode: "Rodeo/Cop" |
| 1979 | The Rockford Files | Whitney Cox | Episode: "Only Rock 'n' Roll Will Never Die: Parts 1 & 2" |
| 1980 | Once Upon a Family | Pam Ferguson | Television movie |
| 1980 | Brave New World | Lenina Disney | Television movie |
| 1980 | Good Time Harry | Carol Younger | 7 episodes |
| 1981 | Likely Stories, Vol. 1 | | Television movie |
| 1982 | Magnum, P.I. | Dr. Karen Harmon | Episode: "Heal Thyself" |
| 1983 | At Ease | Olivia Taylor | Episode: "Love Sick" |
| 1984 | E/R | Dr. Eve Sheridan | Episode: "Pilot: Parts 1 & 2" |
| 1985 | Shadow Chasers | Stella Pence | Episode: "Shadow Chasers: Part 1" |
| 1987 | Stingray | Councilwoman Sondra Decker | Episode: "Gemini" |
| 1987 | Amazing Stories | Nel Lewise | Episode: "Such Interesting Neighbors" |
| 1987 | Haunted by Her Past | Rita Kamen | Television movie |
| 1987 | I Married Dora | Nina | Episode: "A Matter of Moulding" |
| 1988 | ABC Afterschool Specials | Mary Watson | Episode: "Daddy Can't Read" |
| 1988 | CBS Summer Playhouse | Elaine | Episode: "Tickets, Please" |
| 1989 | TV 101 | Mrs. Myers | 3 episodes |
| 1989 | Miss Teen USA 1989 | Co-host | |
| 1989–1990 | Booker | Alicia Rudd | 22 episodes |
| 1992 | Mastergate | Merry Chase | Television movie |
| 1992 | Civil Wars | Marcia Kellogg | Episode: "A Bus Named Desire" |
| 1994 | Phenom | Catherine | Episode: "Men Are Dogs" |
| 1995 | Family Reunion: A Relative Nightmare | Margaret McKenna | Television movie |
| 1995 | Touched by an Angel | Lisa Patcherik | Episode: "Interview with an Angel" |
| 1995 | Charlie Grace | Andrea Farrell | Episode: "Bring Me the Head of Darnell Sims" |
| 1995–1997 | Aaahh!!! Real Monsters | Hairyette / Harryette / Weatherperson | 5 episodes |
| 1996 | Murder, She Wrote | Terri Garman Holbert | Episode: "The Dark Side of the Door" |
| 1996 | The Rockford Files: Friends and Foul Play | Dr. Trish George | Television movie |
| 1996 | Highlander | Betsy Fields | Episode: "Glory Days" |
| 1997 | L.A. Heat | Martha | Episode: Rap Sheet" |
| 1997 | Tracey Takes On... | Mallory Blair | Episode: "Politics" |
| 1997 | Rugrats | Miss Appleby | Episode: "Dust Bunnies/Educating Angelica" |
| 1997 | Baywatch | Rena Jaffe | Episode: "Out of the Blue" |
| 1999 | Odd Man Out | Wendy Flemming | Episode: "Batman Forever" |
| 2000 | Noah Knows Best | Martine Beznick | 13 episodes |
| 2001–2002 | Providence | Meredith | 8 episodes |
| 2003 | Tremors | Nancy Sterngood | 13 episodes |
| 2004 | Third Watch | Sergeant Laura Wynn | 4 episodes |
| 2006 | Twenty Good Years | Mackenzie | Episode: "The Crying Game" |
| 2014 | Looking for Mr. Right | Opal | Television movie |

== Discography ==
- "The Flower Children" / "Out of the Picture" (1967) (BB-#105)
- "The Groovy World of Jack & Jill" / "The Flower Shop" (1967)
- "Self-Analysis" / "Star Gazer" (1968)

== Bibliography ==
=== Biography ===
- Strassman, Marcia & Marshall, Penny (Foreword) (2008). Life with a Side Order of Cancer. Richmond, VA: Palari Publishing.
