= Chiller Theatre (1963 TV series) =

American television program

Chiller Theatre, or Chiller Theater, was a late-night horror and science fiction movie program on WIIC/WPXI, Channel 11, Pittsburgh, Pennsylvania. It aired from September 14, 1963, to January 1, 1984. It was hosted by Bill Cardille, known to fans as "Chilly Billy". It was a Saturday night tradition for two generations of Pittsburghers. Two films were shown, one starting at 11:30 p.m. and the second starting at about 1:00 a.m. In between films, and at random times during the films, breaks were taken for skits such as reports from the "PSS"; in these skits, Bill Cardille would go into another part of the WIIC studios and pretend he was broadcasting from the (nonexistent) Pittsburgh Subway System. Other characters (portrayed by Cardille) included Captain Bad, Maurice the Matchmaker, and Mr. Magnificent. Cardille and WIIC publicist Robert Willis wrote the skits, followed by staff director/producer Michael Styer and sometimes Channel 11 staffers were enlisted to play bit parts. At the end of the show, Cardille would sit on a stool and banter with the studio crew.

== Popularity and unique features ==
Chiller Theatre was so popular in Pittsburgh that it kept Saturday Night Live off of its NBC affiliate WIIC in Pittsburgh for four years. Finally giving in to pressure from NBC, Chiller Theatre was forced to follow SNL at 1:00 a.m. where it was reduced to a single feature movie program.

The show was remembered for several unique features, one being its theme song, "Experiment In Terror" performed by Al Caiola, written by Henry Mancini. The original set was meant to be a laboratory. It was changed to a castle motif when a cast of supporting characters was added in later years. That cast included Terminal Stare (Donna Rae), Georgette the Fudgemaker (Bonnie Barney), Norman the Castle Keeper (Norman Elder), and Stefan the Castle Prankster (Steve Luncinski). During breaks in the movie, Cardille would perform several sketches, like reciting horoscopes, trivia, and telling a series of corny jokes to a giggling skull.

The show featured many guests over the years, including: George A. Romero who appeared in 1968, discussing the famous Pittsburgh set horror film Night of the Living Dead (which Cardille himself had appeared in, playing himself as a channel 11 news reporter) and his love of the show; Rod McKuen; Phyllis Diller as a monster Chilly Billy creates; Barbara Feldon as "Agent 99" from Get Smart; Lorne Greene; Albie And Friends performing their 1974 NIK single "Hexorcist World Premiere"; Vincent Price; Jerry Lewis, promoting the Muscular Dystrophy telethon; and Bruno Sammartino.

== Cancellation and legacy ==
Chiller Theatre's successful run ended at the end of 1983. Precipitating its demise was a decision by WPXI management to air the hour-long weekend edition of Entertainment Tonight immediately after Saturday Night Live, pushing Chiller Theater's start time to 2:00 a.m. -- too late for even the most devoted fans to fight off sleep. The show ended January 1, 1984.

Chiller Theatre was replaced by a new program called The Saturday Late Show, which still featured the horror and sci-fi movies, but without the local element that made Chiller Theatre what it was. The show was canceled less than a year later.

Despite the cancellation of Chiller Theatre, Cardille did not disappear from WPXI-TV. He continued his duties as chief booth announcer and did the weather reports during the noon newscasts for many years until his retirement. After that, Cardille returned to his radio roots until his death in July 2016.

Cardille, Rae, and Luncinski continued to make annual Halloween appearances though 2005, including an annual Chiller Cruise on the Gateway Clipper. Luncinski had been on Cardille's daily radio show on Pittsburgh's WJAS at various times over the years plus was a regular every year on the local part of the Jerry Lewis Annual Telethon broadcast from Monroeville Mall. He also had his own auto repair business in Pittsburgh, Pinnacle Auto Repair. He died on January 8, 2009. Rae lives in the Pittsburgh area and still does some acting. Barney married a golf pro and moved to Florida. Elder, who was an independent filmmaker from Weirton, West Virginia, died in 2000.

The show continues to be popular thanks in part to Bill Cardille's official website Chiller Theater Memories.

The show also inspired SCTV's Joe Flaherty, a Pittsburgh native, to create the series of "Monster Chiller Horror Theater" sketches on the program. Flaherty played Count Floyd, an alter ego of SCTV character Floyd Robertson. Unlike Cardille, Count Floyd dressed in vampire regalia. Sometimes, Floyd warned of fictional scary films that turned out to be Western Pennsylvania in-jokes, such as the film titled Blood-Sucking Monkeys from West Mifflin, Pennsylvania (a Pittsburgh suburb). In other cases, the films were bland, non-horror fare, such as The Odd Couple or Georgy Girl.
