= Ed Grimley =

Fictional character created and portrayed by Martin Short

- First appearance: "Indecent Exposure - SCTV Movie of the Week: The Nutty Lab Assistant"; SCTV; November 12, 1982
- Created by: Martin Short
- Portrayed by: Martin Short

Edward Mayhoff Grimley is a fictional character created and portrayed by Martin Short. Developed amongst The Second City improv comedy troupe, Grimley made his television debut on the sketch comedy show SCTV in 1982, leading to popular success for both Short and the persona. Short portrayed Grimley on Saturday Night Live and in various other appearances, including a starring role in Hanna-Barbera's 1988 animated series The Completely Mental Misadventures of Ed Grimley, and in Short's comedy specials I, Martin Short, Goes Hollywood and I, Martin Short, Goes Home.

== Concept and creation ==
Martin Short originated the character on Toronto's Second City stage as an unnamed school parent in a sketch. Originally, his hair was simply very greasy and unkempt, but Peter Aykroyd, another cast member, joked offstage that the height of the hair seemed to increase with each performance. In an interview, Short said that he was inspired by a scene from the John Wayne movie McLintock and started greasing it straight up. Short noticed an incidental baring of his teeth raised laughs; that too became a character trait. Over numerous appearances, the character of Ed Grimley began to take shape.

Ed Grimley is an excessively cowlicked, voluble, hyperactive manchild who is obsessed with banal popular culture, particularly Wheel of Fortune and its host, Pat Sajak. He also loves to play the triangle, which for him consists of playing a recorded musical piece, striking the triangle once, and then wildly dancing to the recording. His catchphrases include "I must say", "let's face it", "totally decent", "makes me completely mental," and "give me a break".

== Appearances ==
Short was added to the cast of Second City's television offshoot SCTV in 1982, debuting the Ed Grimley character in the skit "SCTV Movie of the Week: The Nutty Lab Assistant". Grimley became an SCTV fixture, appearing in the various shows, commercials, promos, and "behind-the-scenes" dramas that made up the fictional channel's programming. After the show's end in 1984, Short moved to the more prominent Saturday Night Live, bringing his breakout character with him.

With Grimley, his best-known original character, Martin Short's popularity on SNL proved to be the springboard to a long career in film and television. He appeared as Ed Grimley in his 1985 Showtime special Martin Short: Concert For the North Americas, at Comic Relief 1986, and in 1989's I, Martin Short, Goes Hollywood. Grimley became a cartoon character in Hanna-Barbera's 1988 animated series The Completely Mental Misadventures of Ed Grimley, featuring Second City colleagues Joe Flaherty (also reprising his SCTV character, Count Floyd), Catherine O'Hara and Andrea Martin as series regulars.

Short briefly revived the Ed Grimley role in his 1995 series The Show Formerly Known As the Martin Short Show, for a spoof of the comedy film Dave, and appeared again in a 1996 episode of Muppets Tonight, in which Grimley marries Miss Piggy to obtain an $85 inheritance from his deceased great-uncle. The character seemingly died later that year on Saturday Night Live, in the skit "Ed Grimley in Heaven", though Grimley is brought back to life by his guardian angel (played by guest star Chevy Chase) after showing a video of Ed Grimley's life and commenting that he needs to do more with it before he can come back to Heaven. Grimley would however make a number of appearances in 1999's The Martin Short (Talk) Show.

Ed Grimley made a brief onstage appearance, triangle in hand, in the 2006 Broadway show Martin Short: Fame Becomes Me. He appeared again in 2009's Let Freedom Hum: An Evening of Comedy Hosted By Martin Short. Short reprised his role as Ed Grimley in a Saturday Night Live parody music video of Drake's Hotline Bling in November 2015 on the season 41 episode hosted by then-Presidential candidate Donald Trump.

== See also ==
- Recurring Saturday Night Live characters and sketches
