= Don Kirshner's Rock Concert =

American television music variety show

- Created by: Don Kirshner
- Starring: Various
- Country of origin: United States
- No. of episodes: 230

Production
- Executive producer: Don Kirshner
- Running time: 90 minutes

Original release
- Network: Syndicated
- Release: September 27, 1973 – 1981

Don Kirshner's Rock Concert is an American television music variety show that ran during the 1970s and early 1980s, created and produced by Don Kirshner and syndicated to television stations, initially through Viacom Enterprises, and later through Syndicast. It premiered on September 27, 1973, with a performance by The Rolling Stones and The Doobie Brothers; its last episode was in 1981.

== History ==
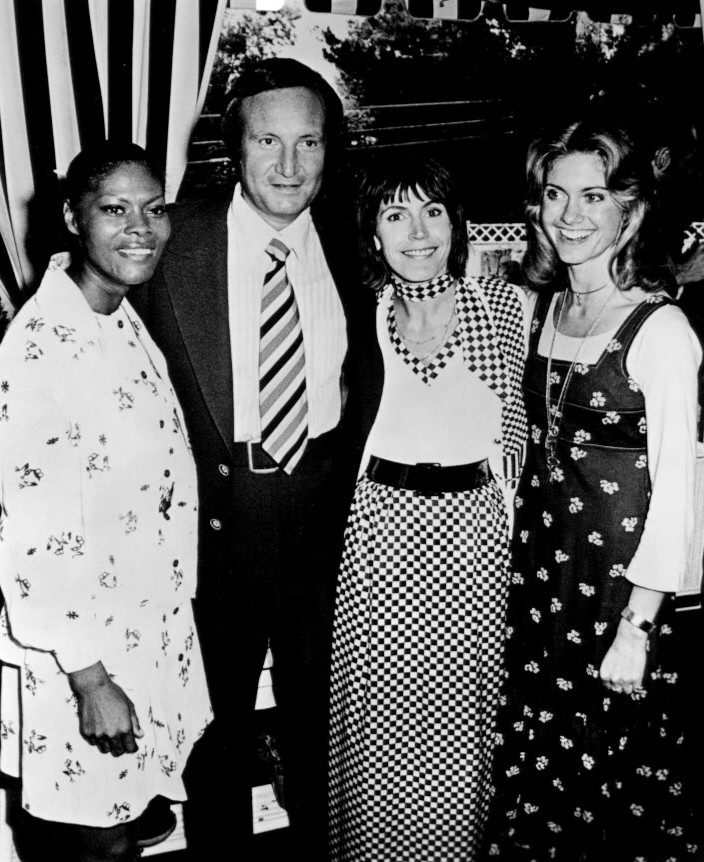
Dionne Warwick (left), Don Kirshner (center left), Helen Reddy (center right), and Olivia Newton-John (right), Don Kirshner's Rock Concert anniversary party, 1974.

Kirshner had been executive producer and "creative consultant" on ABC's In Concert series which debuted with two shows in November and December 1972, in the 11:30 p.m. time slot usually held by The Dick Cavett Show. The programs, taped at the Hofstra Playhouse at Hofstra University in Hempstead, N.Y., featured performances by Alice Cooper; Curtis Mayfield; Seals & Crofts; Bo Diddley; The Allman Brothers Band; Chuck Berry; Blood, Sweat & Tears; Poco; The Steve Miller Band; and Joe Walsh. Their rating more than doubled the average rating of The Dick Cavett Show and even topped NBC's The Tonight Show Starring Johnny Carson in some markets and among viewers under the age of 35.

In Concert became a bi-weekly series in January 1973. "Right now, we have more artists than we know what to do with," Kirshner's music director Wally Gold told The Washington Post late in 1972. "We pay them scale to appear, which is way below what they usually get for a concert, but they know that the publicity is well worth it. So everyone wants to be on. We're getting hundreds of calls. At first, we had to beg the artists to appear. Now they're begging us."

In September 1973, Kirshner left In Concert—he received producing credits for three more shows—to launch his own syndicated "Don Kirshner's Rock Concert." The premiere, on September 27, 1973, featured The Rolling Stones, taped in London, in their first appearance on American TV in more than four years.

The program featured many of the popular performers of the day during its run and other notable guests included Rush, The Eagles, Kiss, Foghat, The Ramones, Kansas, Van Morrison and The Allman Brothers Band. Kirshner personally commissioned rock designer Jim Evans to create a special logo for the show.

The show was hosted by Kirshner up till the last season. His on-air delivery was described as flat by viewers. Paul Shaffer often lampooned him in a convincing impersonation on Saturday Night Live, which went head-to-head against "Rock Concert" in some cities between 1975 and 1981. In its final season the show was hosted by Kirshner's son and daughter.

As with The Midnight Special, Don Kirshner's Rock Concert was noted for featuring live performances, which was unusual for the period since most television appearances at that time used lip-synching to prerecorded music. Kirshner's show was recorded in stereo utilizing simulcast to broadcast on FM Stereo radio stations and early Cable TV.

The series also occasionally aired vintage footage of older acts such as Bill Haley & His Comets, Dusty Springfield and Ritchie Valens, which due to the age of the recordings were broadcast in mono.

Don Kirshner's Rock Concert library is owned by SOFA Entertainment and Historic films.

== Performers who appeared on Don Kirshner's Rock Concert ==
- 10cc
- A Taste of Honey
- ABBA
- The Allman Brothers Band
- Ambrosia
- Andy Gibb
- Angel
- Argent
- Average White Band
- Bad Company
- Badfinger
- Bachman-Turner Overdrive
- Bar Kays
- Joan Baez
- Bee Gees
- Pat Benatar
- Black Oak Arkansas
- Black Sabbath
- Blood, Sweat & Tears
- Blue Öyster Cult
- David Bowie
- Brooklyn Dreams
- Brownsville Station
- Eric Burdon
- The Byrds
- Cameo
- Irene Cara
- Harry Chapin
- Cheap Trick
- Alice Cooper
- Jim Croce
- Sarah Dash
- Devo
- Dixie Dregs
- The Doobie Brothers
- Donna Summer
- Dr. Hook
- Dr. John
- Eagles
- Earth, Wind & Fire
- Edgar Winter Group
- Electric Light Orchestra
- Emerson, Lake & Palmer
- Bryan Ferry
- Fleetwood Mac
- Flying Burrito Brothers
- Focus
- Foghat
- Rory Gallagher
- Genesis
- Golden Earring
- Grand Funk Railroad
- The Guess Who
- George Harrison
- The Hollies
- Herbie Hancock
- Hot Tuna
- The Isley Brothers
- James Gang
- Rick James
- Billy Joel
- Journey
- Waylon Jennings
- Kansas
- KC and the Sunshine Band
- B. B. King
- Kiss
- Gladys Knight & the Pips
- Patti LaBelle
- Lake
- Lenny Williams
- Lynyrd Skynyrd
- Mahavishnu Orchestra
- Mahogany Rush
- Meat Loaf
- Melissa Manchester
- Manfred Mann's Earth Band
- Frank Marino
- Don McLean
- Molly Hatchet
- Montrose
- Mother's Finest
- Maria Muldaur
- Marshall Tucker Band
- New Birth
- New York Dolls
- Nitty Gritty Dirt Band
- Ted Nugent
- Gary Numan
- Ohio Players
- Osibisa
- Outlaws
- The Ozark Mountain Daredevils
- Robert Palmer
- The Police
- Billy Preston
- Prince & The Revolution
- Pure Prairie League with Vince Gill
- Queen
- The Ramones
- Lou Rawls
- Rainbow
- Raspberries
- Helen Reddy
- Lou Reed
- Martha Reeves
- REO Speedwagon
- Vicki Sue Robinson
- The Rolling Stones
- Linda Ronstadt
- Todd Rundgren
- Rush
- Rose Royce
- Santana
- The Sex Pistols
- Seals & Crofts
- Sensational Alex Harvey Band
- Slade
- Slave
- Sly & the Family Stone
- Southside Johnny & the Asbury Jukes
- Sparks
- Jimmie Spheeris
- The Spinners
- The Stampeders
- Starz
- Steely Dan
- Steppenwolf
- Steve Miller Band
- Stephanie Mills
- Cat Stevens
- The Sylvers
- Sylvester
- Switch
- Bram Tchaikovsky
- The Temptations
- Tim Weisberg
- Marc Bolan and T. Rex
- Tower of Power
- Ike & Tina Turner
- UFO
- Uriah Heep
- Village People
- Joe Walsh
- Bay City Rollers
- Van Halen
- Van Morrison
- Waylon Jennings
- Walter Murphy
- War
- Weather Report
- Wet Willie
- Wild Cherry
- Wishbone Ash
- Wizzard
- Stevie Wonder
- Zebra

== Episode Guide ==
=== Season 1 (1973–1974) ===
Episode	Guests	Original Air Date
1	Live Performances: The Doobie Brothers – instrumental jam, "China Grove", "Long Train Runnin'", "Clear As the Driven Snow" and "Without Love". Earth, Wind and Fire – "Head to the Sky" and "Evil". Cross Country – "In The Midnight Hour", "City Lights", "Tastes So Good To Me" and "Cross Country". Music Videos: The Rolling Stones (from London) – "Angie" (video #1), "Silver Train", "Dancing with Mr. D" and "Angie" (video #2).	Sept 27, 1973
2	Grand Opera House in Macon, Georgia. The Allman Brothers Band – "Done Somebody Wrong", "Southbound", "Midnight Rider", "Ain't Wastin' Time No More", "Statesboro Blues" and "Ramblin' Man". Wet Willie – "That's All Right", "Grits Ain't Groceries" and "Country Side Of Life". The Marshall Tucker Band – "Take the Highway", "Can't You See?" and "Ramblin'". Martin Mull plays "Ukulele Blues" during a stand-up comedy monologue.	Oct 5, 1973
3	Sly and the Family Stone – "Hey Music Lover", "Life" (and/or "You're the One"), "Stand!", "If You Want Me To Stay", "Thank You (Falettinme Be Mice Elf Agin)", "Dance To The Music" and "Hey Music Lover". Black Oak Arkansas – "Hot and Nasty", "Hot Rod", "Jim Dandy" and "Up".	Oct 9, 1973
4	Van Morrison, Mott the Hoople, Gospel group Fresh Flavor with Richie Havens.	
5	Episode dedicated to Jim Croce who was supposed to appear but had recently died in airplane crash. Dave Mason – "Feelin' Alright", "Baby... Please" and "Look At You Look At Me". The Mark-Almond Band – "What Am I Living For?", "The Neighborhood Man" and "The City". Jesse Colin Young – "Song for Juli", "Morning Sun" and "T-Bone Shuffle". Jim Croce (on tape) – "You Don't Mess Around with Jim" and "Roller Derby Queen".	
6	Seals and Crofts – "We May Never Pass This Way (Again)", "Summer Breeze", "Standin' On A Mountain Top" and "Hummingbird". Seals and Crofts (later in show) – "Ruby Jean and Billie Lee", "Paper Airplanes", "Diamond Girl", "Unborn Child" and a fiddle breakdown. Tower of Power – "Get Yo' Feet Back on the Ground", "Soul Vaccination", "This Time It's Real", "What Is Hip?" and "Knock Yourself Out".	Nov 16, 1973
7	New York's Palace Theatre. Johnny Winter (band) – "Rock and Roll Hoochie Koo", "Stone County", "Jumpin' Jack Flash", "Johnny B. Goode" and "Silver Train". Argent – "God Gave Rock and Roll to You", "I Am the Dance of Ages", "I Don't Believe in Miracles", "It's Only Money" and "Hold Your Head Up".	Dec 29, 1973
8	The Isley Brothers, Mahavishnu Orchestra, Poco, Billy Joel	
9	Taped live at New York's famous Palace Theatre, with musical performances from The Steve Miller Band and The Raspberries	
10	Stories, The Isley Brothers, Slade, Atley Yeager	
11	Eric Burdon, Foghat, Mandrill	
12	The James Gang, Rick Nelson & The Stone Canyon Band, Maria Muldaur	
13	Tribute to the late Jim Croce with musical performances by Jim Croce, Loggins & Messina, The Carpenters, Randy Newman, Tommy West & Terry Cashman. Stars also reminisce about Croce	
14	Rod Stewart & The Faces, Livingston Taylor, British Afro-Pop band Osibisa	
15	Billy Preston, Al Wilson, Brownsville Station	
16	Dr. John, Climax Blues Band, The Chamber Brothers, Byron Macgregor	
17		
18	Michael Stanley's Super Session, Ike & Tina Turner Revue, Redbone	
19	Martha Reeves & The All Stars, Larry Raspberry & The Highstepper, Leo Kottke, Kansas	
20	The Eagles, Linda Ronstadt, Jackson Browne	
21	REO Speedwagon, 10cc, Billy Joel, Dobie Gray	
22	Manfred Mann, Mike Oldfield, David Essex, Electric Light Orchestra (ELO), Bloodstone	

=== Season 2 (1974–1975) ===
Episode	Guests	Original Air Date
S02E01	The O'Jays – "Back Stabbers", "Put Your Hands Together" and "For the Love of Money". The Hues Corporation – "All Goin' Down Together", "Love Train" (cover of The O'Jays hit), "Freedom for the Stallion" and "Rock the Boat". The Commodores – "Machine Gun", "I Feel Sanctified" and "Something's Mighty Mighty Wrong". The Impressions – "People Get Ready", "It's All Right", "Talking About My Baby"/"Woman's Got Soul" medley and "Finally Got Myself Together". The O'Jays – "When the World's at Peace".	Sept 21, 1974

== In popular culture ==
The TV series SCTV satirized Don Kirshner's Rock Concert as Lee A. Iacocca's Rock Concert in an episode of the same name; the premiere of season 3. Dave Thomas appeared as Lee Iacocca asking for government help to subsidize the costs of running the show, a satirical take on his asking the government to bail out Chrysler around the same time. The skit also mentions Paul Shaffer's satires of him on Saturday Night Live and also has a performance of the song "Tie a Yellow Ribbon Round the Ole Oak Tree" but sung as "Tie a Yellow Ribbon Round a Dodge Omni" sung by him and Tony Orlando (Tony Rosato). The skit appears on the 'Best of the Early Years' DVD.

In the Blue Öyster Cult song "The Marshall Plan" from their 1980 album Cultösaurus Erectus, Don Kirshner makes a cameo as himself introducing Johnny (the subject of the song) as if Johnny were a guest on Don Kirshner's Rock Concert.

== See also ==
- The Midnight Special
- List of late night network TV programs
