= List of SCTV episodes =

The following is a list of episodes for the television series Second City Television (SCTV).

== Season 1 ==
Aired on Global

- "Season 1" is actually produced in two distinct 13-episode blocks, over a fifteen month period. The cast consists of John Candy, Joe Flaherty, Eugene Levy, Andrea Martin, Catherine O'Hara, Harold Ramis, and Dave Thomas. All are also listed as writers (except Martin and O'Hara on the initial broadcasts of the first four episodes -- this was later corrected on syndicated prints), with Ramis as head writer.

| No. in series | No. in season | Title | Original air date | Synopsis |
|---|---|---|---|---|
| 1 | 1 | Backstage | September 21, 1976 | |
| 2 | 2 | Murder at SCTV | October 21, 1976 | Guest starring Jayne Eastwood |
| 3 | 3 | Ethnic Humour | November 18, 1976 | |
| 4 | 4 | Crosswords | December 16, 1976 | Guest starring John Gielgud and Ralph Richardson. |
| 5 | 5 | Match Unto My Feet | January 13, 1977 | Guest starring Brenda Donohue; Valri Bromfield appears briefly, uncredited. |
| 6 | 6 | Memoirs of Anton Chekhov | February 10, 1977 | |
| 7 | 7 | Dialing For Dollars | February 24, 1977 | |
| 8 | 8 | Shock Theatre | March 10, 1977 | |
| 9 | 9 | Philosophy Street / A Fistful of Ugly | March 24, 1977 | |
| 10 | 10 | Therese et Joe | April 7, 1977 | |
| 11 | 11 | Broads Behind Bars | April 21, 1977 | Mary Margaret O'Hara appears, uncredited. |
| 12 | 12 | The Taxidermist | May 5, 1977 | |
| 13 | 13 | Ben Hur | May 19, 1977 | |
| 14 | 14 | The Hefty Neil Story | September 19, 1977 | |
| 15 | 15 | Leave It to Beaver | September 26, 1977 | |
| 16 | 16 | Goodbye America | October 3, 1977 | |
| 17 | 17 | Galaxy 66 | October 10, 1977 | |
| 18 | 18 | Madame Blitzman | October 17, 1977 | |
| 19 | 19 | The $129,000 Question | October 24, 1977 | |
| 20 | 20 | Dr. Tongue's House of Wax / SCTV Boogie | October 31, 1977 | |
| 21 | 21 | The Sammy Maudlin Show | November 7, 1977 | |
| 22 | 22 | World at War | November 14, 1977 | |
| 23 | 23 | The Grapes of Mud | November 21, 1977 | |
| 24 | 24 | Officer Friendly | November 28, 1977 | |
| 25 | 25 | The Man Who Would Be King of the Popes | December 5, 1977 | |
| 26 | 26 | Lust for Paint | December 12, 1977 | |

== Season 2 ==
Aired on Global

- After a nine-month break, the show returns for Season 2. The cast consists of John Candy, Joe Flaherty, Eugene Levy, Andrea Martin, Catherine O'Hara, and Dave Thomas. Harold Ramis also returns, but only appears in the first and third episodes of the season. He remains as head writer until close to the end of the season.

| No. in series | No. in season | Title | Original air date | Synopsis |
|---|---|---|---|---|
| 27 | 1 | Premiere | September 16, 1978 | |
| 28 | 2 | Bob Hope Desert Classic | September 23, 1978 | |
| 29 | 3 | Kidnapping of Moe Green | September 30, 1978 | |
| 30 | 4 | SCTV Solid Gold Telethon | October 7, 1978 | |
| 31 | 5 | Writer's Strike | October 14, 1978 | |
| 32 | 6 | Municipal Election | October 21, 1978 | |
| 33 | 7 | Farm Film Report / Arabs | October 28, 1978 | |
| 34 | 8 | The Mirthmakers / Happy Endings | November 4, 1978 | |
| 35 | 9 | Undersea World | November 11, 1978 | |
| 36 | 10 | Edith Prickley, Station Manager | November 18, 1978 | |
| 37 | 11 | SCTV 30th Anniversary Show | November 25, 1978 | |
| 38 | 12 | Whispers of the Wolf / The Occult | December 2, 1978 | |
| 39 | 13 | Bad Acting In Hollywood | December 9, 1978 | |
| 40 | 14 | Alfred Hitchcock Presents | December 16, 1978 | Peter Aykroyd has an uncredited bit part. |
| 41 | 15 | Fighting Air Dogs | December 23, 1978 | |
| 42 | 16 | Death Takes No Holiday | December 31, 1978 | |
| 43 | 17 | Rock Concert | January 6, 1979 | |
| 44 | 18 | Fantasy Island | January 13, 1979 | |
| 45 | 19 | On the Waterfront Again | January 20, 1979 | |
| 46 | 20 | SCTV Disco | January 27, 1979 | |
| 47 | 21 | Pipeline | February 3, 1979 | |
| 48 | 22 | Consumer Action Line | February 10, 1979 | |
| 49 | 23 | Relaxing With Raoul / Dining With LaRue | February 17, 1979 | |
| 50 | 24 | The Flaming Turkey | February 24, 1979 | |
| 51 | 25 | Best Of (1) | March 3, 1979 | |
| 52 | 26 | Best Of (2) | March 10, 1979 | |

== Season 3 ==
Aired on CBC

- After a year-and-a-half, SCTV returns for season three. Returning cast members are Joe Flaherty, Eugene Levy, Andrea Martin, and Dave Thomas; they are joined by new cast members Robin Duke, Rick Moranis, and Tony Rosato. (John Candy and Catherine O'Hara were not in the cast this year, but would return.) Although they appear in every episode, Levy and Andrea Martin film all their sketches and scenes on a "part-time" basis.

| No. in series | No. in season | Title | Original air date | Synopsis |
|---|---|---|---|---|
| 53 | 1 | Lee A. Iacocca's Rock Concert | September 19, 1980 | |
| 54 | 2 | Thursday Night Live | September 26, 1980 | |
| 55 | 3 | Death of a Salesman | October 3, 1980 | |
| 56 | 4 | My Factory, My Self | October 10, 1980 | |
| 57 | 5 | Death Motel | October 17, 1980 | |
| 58 | 6 | The Lone Ranger Show | October 24, 1980 | |
| 59 | 7 | Play It Again, Bob | October 31, 1980 | |
| 60 | 8 | Gaslight | November 7, 1980 | |
| 61 | 9 | Man's Ability to Imitate | November 14, 1980 | |
| 62 | 10 | Mel's Rock Pile | November 21, 1980 | |
| 63 | 11 | The Sammy Maudlin Show | November 28, 1980 | |
| 64 | 12 | Hugh Betcha's Night Gallery | December 5, 1980 | |
| 65 | 13 | Star Wars | December 12, 1980 | |
| 66 | 14 | Hollywood Salutes Its Extras | December 19, 1980 | |
| 67 | 15 | The Irwin Allen Show | December 26, 1980 | |
| 68 | 16 | Big Brother | January 2, 1981 | |
| 69 | 17 | Two Way TV / Pit Bulls | January 9, 1981 | |
| 70 | 18 | Alpha Channel | January 16, 1981 | |
| 71 | 19 | Midnight Express Special | January 23, 1981 | |
| 72 | 20 | Cookery Crock / Cartoon Coroner | January 30, 1981 | |
| 73 | 21 | The Mating Game | February 6, 1981 | |
| 74 | 22 | Gene Shalit's America | February 13, 1981 | |
| 75 | 23 | Mel's Rock Pile: MacArthur Park | February 20, 1981 | |
| 76 | 24 | Dick Cavett | February 27, 1981 | |
| 77 | 25 | The Cisco Kid | March 6, 1981 | This episode features a few sketches with the regular cast, but most of the show consists of an episode of The Cisco Kid with redubbed dialogue. This piece was actually an unsold pilot from 1978 featuring the voices of Martin Short, Steven Kampmann, Peter Torokvei and Don Dickinson, all members of the Second City Toronto cast between 1977 and 1979. Short would later join SCTV as a cast member. |
| 78 | 26 | Best Of | March 13, 1981 | |

== Season 4 ==
Aired on CBC (Canada), NBC (U.S.)

Only two months after season 3 ends, season 4 starts. Tony Rosato and Robin Duke both leave the show to be cast members on Saturday Night Live, which was infamously doing poorly with critics and in the ratings at that time, so much so that NBC actually started airing SCTV (named SCTV Network 90) as a possible replacement for SNL. John Candy and Catherine O'Hara rejoin the cast, and Eugene Levy and Andrea Martin return to doing the show full-time.

The cast now consists of John Candy, Joe Flaherty, Eugene Levy, Andrea Martin, Rick Moranis, Catherine O'Hara, and Dave Thomas. Many of the early season 4 episodes contain rerun sketches from seasons one to three. Former cast members Harold Ramis, Tony Rosato and Robin Duke can sometimes be seen in these sketches, but are uncredited.

For the final three episodes of the season, Martin Short (who first appeared on the "Cisco Kid" episode in season three) is added to the cast.

=== Cycle 1 ===
| No. in series | No. in season | Title | Original air date | Synopsis |
|---|---|---|---|---|
| 79 | 1 | One On the Town | May 15, 1981 | Levon Helm performs. |
| 80 | 2 | Polynesiantown | May 22, 1981 | Guest starring Dr. John. |
| 81 | 3 | Southside Fracas | May 29, 1981 | Southside Johnny and the Asbury Jukes perform. |
| 82 | 4 | Repeats | June 19, 1981 | |
| 83 | 5 | Lunchtime Street Beef | July 3, 1981 | Robert Gordon performs. |
| 84 | 6 | Moral Majority | July 10, 1981 | |
| 85 | 7 | Pledge Week | July 17, 1981 | Roy Orbison performs. |
| 86 | 8 | Bouncin' Back To You | July 24, 1981 | The Tubes perform. |
| 87 | 9 | The Great White North | July 31, 1981 | Guest starring Ian Thomas. |

=== Cycle 2 ===
| No. in series | No. in season | Title | Original air date | Synopsis |
|---|---|---|---|---|
| 88 | 10 | CCCP 1 | October 16, 1981 | Al Jarreau performs. |
| 89 | 11 | I'm Taking My Own Head, Screwing It On Right, and No Guy's Gonna Tell Me It Ain't | October 23, 1981 | The Plasmatics and Wendy O. Williams perform. |
| 90 | 12 | Zontar | October 30, 1981 | Guest starring Bonar Bain and Natalie Cole. |
| 91 | 13 | Walter Cronkite's Brain | November 6, 1981 | Rough Trade performs. |
| 92 | 14 | Doorway to Hell | November 20, 1981 | Eugene Fodor performs. |
| 93 | 15 | The Godfather | December 11, 1981 | James Ingram performs. |
| 94 | 16 | SCTV Staff Christmas Party | December 18, 1981 | |
| 95 | 17 | Teacher's Pet | February 12, 1982 | The Boomtown Rats perform. |
| 96 | 18 | Midnight Video Special | February 19, 1982 | Talking Heads and The Plastics perform. |

=== The Best of SCTV Specials ===
| Title | Original air date | Synopsis |
|---|---|---|
| Special #1 | January 16, 1982 | |
| Special #2 | January 22, 1982 | |
| Special #3 | January 29, 1982 | |

=== Cycle 3 ===
| No. in series | No. in season | Title | Original air date | Synopsis |
|---|---|---|---|---|
| 97 | 19 | The Great White North Palace | April 16, 1982 | Tony Bennett performs. |
| 98 | 20 | Pre-Teen World Telethon | April 23, 1982 | |
| 99 | 21 | The People's Global Golden Choice Awards | May 1, 1982 | Third World performs. |
| 100 | 22 | 3D Stake from the Heart | May 14, 1982 | |
| 101 | 23 | Pet Peeves / The Happy Wanderers | May 21, 1982 | Guest starring Carl Perkins. |
| 102 | 24 | Chariots of Eggs | June 5, 1982 | Hall and Oates perform. |
| 103 | 25 | Battle of the PBS Stars | July 16, 1982 | Guest starring Joe Greene and Rocky Bleier. Dave Edmunds performs. |
| 104 | 26 | Rome, Italian Style | October 15, 1982 | Guest starring Jimmy Buffett. |
| 105 | 27 | The Days of the Week / Street Beef | October 22, 1982 | Guest starring Bill Murray. |

== Season 5 ==
Aired on CBC (Canada), NBC (U.S.)

For season 5, the cast consists of John Candy, Joe Flaherty, Eugene Levy, Andrea Martin, and Martin Short. Rick Moranis, Catherine O'Hara, and Dave Thomas all leave as cast members, though O'Hara and Thomas return for guest appearances, as does former cast member Harold Ramis.

John Hemphill and Mary Charlotte Wilcox join the cast as featured players.

=== Cycle 4 ===
| No. in series | No. in season | Title | Original air date | Synopsis |
|---|---|---|---|---|
| 106 | 1 | Sammy Maudlin 23rd Anniversary / CBC | November 5, 1982 | |
| 107 | 2 | Indecent Exposure | November 12, 1982 | Guest starring Fred Willard, Harold Ramis, and John Mellencamp. |
| 108 | 3 | Melonvote | November 19, 1982 | Guest starring Linda Hopkins. |
| 109 | 4 | Jane Eyrehead | November 26, 1982 | Guest starring Robin Williams. America performs. |
| 110 | 5 | Towering Inferno | December 10, 1982 | |
| 111 | 6 | Christmas | December 17, 1982 | Andraé Crouch performs. |

=== Cycle 5 ===
| No. in series | No. in season | Title | Original air date | Synopsis |
|---|---|---|---|---|
| 112 | 7 | A Star Is Born | January 28, 1983 | Crystal Gayle guest stars. |
| 113 | 8 | SCTV Classifieds / Vic Arpeggio | February 11, 1983 | |
| 114 | 9 | Bobby Bittman's Retirement | February 18, 1983 | Ben Vereen guest stars. |
| 115 | 10 | Sweeps Week | February 25, 1983 | |
| 116 | 11 | South Sea Sinner | March 11, 1983 | Betty Thomas guest stars. |
| 117 | 12 | Midnight Cowboy II | March 18, 1983 | Catherine O'Hara guest stars. |

== Season 6 ==
Aired on Superchannel (Canada), Cinemax (U.S.)

For season 6, the cast consists of Joe Flaherty, Eugene Levy, Andrea Martin, and Martin Short. John Hemphill and Mary Charlotte Wilcox also return as featured players.

John Candy left the show after season 5, but returns for the season 6 opener. Former cast members Catherine O'Hara and Dave Thomas also make guest appearances.

| No. in series | No. in season | Title | Original air date | Synopsis |
|---|---|---|---|---|
| 118 | 1 | Maudlin O' the Night | November 22, 1983 | Guest starring John Candy, Debra McGrath. |
| 119 | 2 | Gimme Jackie / Australia | December 6, 1983 | Guest starring Dave Thomas. |
| 120 | 3 | It's a Wonderful Film | December 20, 1983 | Guest starring Charles Palmer and Catherine O'Hara. |
| 121 | 4 | The Date Debate / Scary Previews | January 3, 1984 | Guest starring Valri Bromfield, Dave Thomas and Catherine O'Hara. |
| 122 | 5 | You're On / Das Boobs | January 17, 1984 | |
| 123 | 6 | Stars In One: Bob Hope / Happy Hour | January 31, 1984 | Guest starring Dave Thomas and Catherine O'Hara. |
| 124 | 7 | Stalag SCTV | February 14, 1984 | Guest starring Fred Willard. |
| 125 | 8 | Diary of a Female Person / Happy Hour | February 28, 1984 | |
| 126 | 9 | Just For Fun / Black Like Vic | March 13, 1984 | |
| 127 | 10 | Youth, Do They Give A Damn or What? / Happy Hour | March 27, 1984 | |
| 128 | 11 | Allenscam | April 10, 1984 | Guest starring Catherine O'Hara. |
| 129 | 12 | Oliver Grimley | April 24, 1984 | |
| 130 | 13 | 2009, Jupiter and Beyond | May 8, 1984 | |
| 131 | 14 | Half Wits / Save the World Parade | May 22, 1984 | |
| 132 | 15 | Jackie Rogers, Jr. for President / Happy Hour | June 5, 1984 | |
| 133 | 16 | Celebrity Fairie Tayles / Canadian Gaffes and Practical Amusements | June 19, 1984 | |
| 134 | 17 | You're On / Happy Hour | July 3, 1984 | |
| 135 | 18 | Pledge Week | July 17, 1984 | Guest starring Catherine O'Hara. |
