= Bill Cardille =

American television/radio personality (1928–2016)

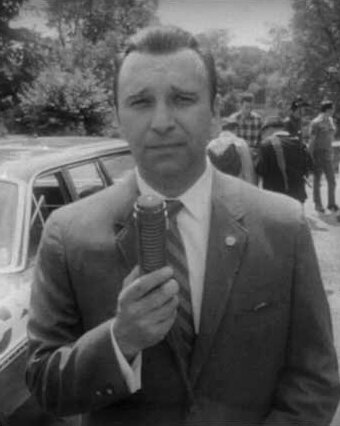
- Cardille in a scene from Night of the Living Dead (1968)
- Born: William Robert Cardille; December 10, 1928; Farrell, Pennsylvania, U.S.
- Died: July 21, 2016 (aged 87); McCandless, Pennsylvania, U.S
- Other name: Chilly Billy
- Occupation: Media personality
- Years active: 1957–2016
- Spouse: Louise Maras (m. 1953)
- Children: 3; including Lori

William Robert Cardille (December 10, 1928 – July 21, 2016), also known as "Chilly Billy", was an American broadcast personality from Pittsburgh, Pennsylvania. He was well known to regional viewers as a late-night horror host, but is perhaps more widely remembered for his appearance in George A. Romero's landmark zombie film Night of the Living Dead (1968), portraying a fictional version of himself; he also appeared as himself in the 1990 remake.

== Early life ==
Born in Farrell, Pennsylvania, Cardille was the son of Mr. and Mrs. William Cardille of Sharon, Pennsylvania. He was a 1947 graduate of Sharon High School. He majored in English and speech at State Teachers College at Indiana in Indiana, Pennsylvania, where he played varsity tennis and basketball.

== Career ==
Cardille had a nightly record program on WDAD radio in Indiana County, Pennsylvania, in 1951. He first worked in television at WICU in Erie, Pennsylvania, beginning January 19, 1952. He was for many years a fixture on Channel 11 (formerly call letters WIIC, now WPXI), the NBC affiliate in Pittsburgh, and was the first voice heard when WIIC went on the air on September 1, 1957.

He was a pitchman for Koehler Beer, starring in various roles, baseball umpire, etc. in numerous TV commercials for Uncle Jackson's brews.

=== Chiller Theater ===
After years of hosting many other local shows on WIIC (at a time when local stations often produced a significant amount of local programming), Cardille became host of the show for which he is probably best known: Chiller Theatre, a late night Saturday program that showed horror and science fiction films. The show earned him his nickname "Chilly Billy." Unlike some horror movie hosts, Cardille did not take on the persona of a horror movie styled character. "Chilly Billy" was an extension of his own personality. Wry, wisecracking and conversational, Cardille went as much for a light comedic feel as he did presenting the movies. The program aired from 1964 until its cancellation in 1983, and had been so popular it kept Saturday Night Live off the air in Pittsburgh for five years. Joe Flaherty, a Pittsburgh native, acknowledges this show as an influence in the creation of the popular "Monster Chiller Horror Theatre" sketches on SCTV. Flaherty's Count Floyd, however, was a comedic variation on Bela Lugosi's Dracula, forever frustrated his horror films were never particularly frightening. Count Floyd's Dracula-like appearance may have been based on "E-Gor," host of KDKA-TV's earlier late night horror film show "The 13th Hour," which ran from 1958 to 1959. He was played by veteran KDKA announcer George Eisenhauer.

=== Other work ===
Cardille also hosted other programs including Studio Wrestling, and a combination game show /movie program that ran in the late afternoon. He hosted a teen dance show "The 6 O'clock Hop", the Four O'Clock Money Movie, and Movies to Laugh By for WIIC. For many years he was the local host for the Jerry Lewis MDA Telethon. Cardille appeared in both the 1968 original version and the 1990 remake of Night of the Living Dead, in the television movie, The Assassination File, and in the documentary American Scary. He was especially famous in Boston, where the weekly pro wrestling program was extremely popular. In the early 70's Chilly Billy co-announced professional wrestling matches with a young Vince McMahon, featuring wrestling greats like Bruno Sanmartino, Haystacks Calhoun, Captain Lou Albano, Chief Jay Strongbow and The Masked Demon, among many others. Cardille also called the play-by-play of western Pennsylvania high school basketball playoff games for many years on WQED-TV, the Pittsburgh PBS affiliate. Cardille also hosted morning radio shows on Pittsburgh radio stations WWSW and WIXZ. He also co-hosted $50,000 Jackpot Bingo on WPXI weeknights with Kate English from February 10-December 26, 1986.

Outside of broadcasting, Cardille owned and operated Chilly Billy Cardille Travel and Tours in Wexford for many years, which was managed by his son, Bill Jr.

== Later life ==
Until 2014, Cardille could be heard on radio station WJAS AM 1320 in the mid-day slot. He retired from WJAS in 2014. During his retirement he resided in McCandless, in Pittsburgh's North Hills, with his wife Louise.

Cardille was also the father of actress Lori Cardille who played the lead role in Romero's Day of the Dead (1985). Bill Cardille was an extra as one of the zombies towards the end of Day of the Dead.

Pittsburgh City Council, as well as officials from Mercer County and Sharon, Pennsylvania, announced plans to honor Cardille with a proclamation to declare September 28, 2010 "Bill Cardille Day."

== Death ==
In early July 2016, Cardille's family announced that he was battling cancer for the second time. He died the morning of July 21, 2016, at his home in McCandless, Pennsylvania.

Asteroid 110416 Cardille was named in his memory. The official naming citation was published by the Minor Planet Center on 25 September 2018 (M.P.C. 111801).

== Filmography ==
| Year | Title | Role | Notes |
|---|---|---|---|
| 1968 | Night of the Living Dead | Field Reporter | |
| 1985 | Day of the Dead | Elevator Zombie | Uncredited |
| 1990 | Night of the Living Dead | TV Interviewer | |
