= Camembert (disambiguation) =

Camembert is a French soft cheese from Normandy.

Camembert may also refer to:

- Camembert, Orne, a commune in the Orne department, Normandy, France
- Earl Camembert, a fictional news reporter and anchorman portrayed by Eugene Levy on the Canadian sketch comedy show SCTV
