= Bill Burns (anchor) =

American TV news anchor (1913–1997)

William M. Burns (April 10, 1913 – September 16, 1997) was an American journalist and television news anchor.

Burns anchored the news for over three decades (1953–1989) in Pittsburgh for KDKA, which was the largest station in the market.

== Career ==
Burns was a native of Houtzdale, Pennsylvania. After serving in World War II, during which he was wounded and earned a Purple Heart medal, Burns came to Pittsburgh in 1946 to work for radio station KQV. He settled in Pittsburgh with his wife, and the couple subsequently had two children, Michael and Patti.

He reported for KQV until 1953, when he went to work for what was then WDTV, Channel 2. WDTV was originally identified as a DuMont Television Network affiliate but became a CBS affiliate and changed its call letters to KDKA in 1955.

Burns was a familiar face to Pittsburghers; for much of the time he was at KDKA, he anchored the noon and 11 p.m. newscasts. Burns became a part of news history when in 1976, he began to share anchor duties with daughter and fellow journalist Patti Burns, who had become an anchor in her own right. Their pairing, initially derided as "The Patti and Daddy Show" garnered high ratings.

Burns anchored KDKA-TV's noon news continuously for over 35 years until he retired in 1989. For most of that time, he also anchored the station's 11 p.m. newscast, working a split 14-hour shift. Pittsburghers still recall his familiar sign-off from his late newscasts, wishing viewers a "Good night, good luck, and good news tomorrow."

Among colleagues, Burns was admired for his gruff sense of humor and accurate retellings of news stories and the arcania of Pennsylvania politics.

It was Bill Burns who broke into KDKA's broadcast of The Mike Douglas Show around 1:40 p.m. on November 22, 1963 (KDKA pre-empted CBS' As the World Turns during that period) to report the shooting of President Kennedy in Dallas, Texas. He would remain on the air for several hours that day.

Burns also announced Pittsburgh Steelers games on TV as a color commentator for the 1967 season with Joe Tucker.

Burns was noted for sometimes injecting his personal opinion into a news story, such as when the Pittsburgh Penguins replaced their popular "skating penguin" logo with the "flying penguin" logo. (Burns would call the "flying penguin" logo a pigeon, though the team has since brought back the "skating penguin" logo.) He was also prone to making jokes and off-the-cuff comments; he once introduced the soap opera that followed his newscast as "The Young and the Breastless".

Burns died on September 16, 1997.

== In popular culture ==
- Burns was the main inspiration for Joe Flaherty's portrayal of Floyd Robertson in the "SCTV News" sketches on SCTV.
