= The Sunshine Hour =

- Genre: Variety show
- Written by: Chuck Weir
- Directed by: Jack O'Neil
- Country of origin: Canada
- Original language: English
- No. of seasons: 1
- No. of episodes: 9

Production
- Executive producer: Ted Regan
- Producer: Jack O'Neil
- Production location: Halifax
- Running time: 60 minutes

Original release
- Network: CBC Television
- Release: 18 June – 27 August 1976

The Sunshine Hour is a Canadian music variety show that aired on CBC Television in 1976.

== Premise ==
Jim Bennet, Tom Gallant and Gloria Kaye starred in this mid-season replacement for The Tommy Hunter Show. The series house band was led by Paul Mason. Comedy sketches were performed by Andrea Martin, Joe Flaherty and Eugene Levy (Second City Television). Visiting artists included Debbie Lori Kaye, Mary Ann McDonald, David Michaels and Marg Osburne.

== Scheduling ==
This hour-long series was broadcast on Fridays at 9:00 p.m. (Eastern) from 18 June to 27 August 1976.
