= Count Floyd =

Fictional character from the TV series SCTV

Count Floyd is a fictional character featured in television and played by comic actor Joe Flaherty. He is a fictional horror host in the tradition of TV movie hosts on local television in both the United States and Canada.

The Count Floyd character originated on the Canadian sketch show SCTV; the character also later appeared on The Completely Mental Misadventures of Ed Grimley (clips of which were used on Cartoon Planet), as well as Rush’s Signals and Grace Under Pressure tours.

== The concept ==
As originally conceived, Count Floyd was the alter-ego of another SCTV character: Floyd Robertson, co-anchor of the SCTV News (The name was a joke based on that of Canadian news anchor Lloyd Robertson, but other than the name and occupation Floyd Robertson bears no real resemblance to his real-life counterpart).

The premise was that employees at this very low-budget TV station had to double up on jobs, so news anchor Floyd Robertson was also the host of SCTV’s Monster Chiller Horror Theatre, wearing a cheap Transylvanian vampire costume and speaking in a stereotypical Bela Lugosi type accent. Oddly, although Floyd was supposed to be a vampire, he would also open each show howling like a werewolf, presumably indicating that Floyd Robertson had only the vaguest of idea what a vampire was. Near the end of a howl, he would break off disarmingly into a weak chuckle.

Although a parody of the typical horror movie hosts that were seen on local television stations during the 1950s to 1970s, the real-life hosts were nearly always already employed in other positions at the TV stations and their horror host personas were often so silly and “over the top” that Count Floyd was not really too far off the mark.

The title Monster Chiller Horror Theatre was taken from the Chiller Theatre, a longtime local horror film show on WIIC (now WPXI) television in Pittsburgh, Joe Flaherty's hometown. While host Bill Cardille also known as "Chilly Billy" was nothing like Count Floyd (Cardille wore a coat and tie and spoke in his normal voice), the Dracula-esque persona adopted by Floyd may have been based on another Pittsburgh TV horror show host. The 1958-59 Friday night program "The Thirteenth Hour," broadcast over KDKA-TV Channel 2 featured the vampire-like "Igor," actually KDKA staff announcer George Eisenhauer whose costume bore no small resemblance to Count Floyd's. Much as Robertson's co-anchor, Earl Camembert (portrayed by Eugene Levy), was partially inspired by American newsman Irv Weinstein (as well as by CBC news reader Earl Cameron, who anchored CBC TV's "The National" newscast from 1959 until 1965), Robertson's doubling as Count Floyd appears to have been at least partially inspired by Weinstein's weather anchor, Tom Jolls, who likewise doubled as the astronaut children's show host Commander Tom.

Occasionally, Count Floyd would be joined by a vampire-caped sidekick known as The Pittsburgh Midget, played by Flaherty's brother Paul Flaherty, an obvious counterpart to diminutive Stefan, the Castle Prankster, played by Stephen Michael Luncinski on Chiller Theatre.

== Running gags ==
The main running gag of the sketch was that the station would usually provide truly awful films for the show that were not in the least bit scary, including such genres as biopics with very scant relation to horror (Madame Blitzman), softcore pornography with a horror theme (Dr. Tongue's 3D House of Stewardesses) and Swedish independent ("Ingmar Burgman"'s Whispers of the Wolf which starred "Leave Ullman"), forcing Floyd to struggle to hype them to his mostly juvenile audience. ("Alright, it wasn't that scary but did you get a good look at those chicks?”). Occasionally, the films provided to Count Floyd would have absolutely no connection to horror at all—on one memorable occasion, he was stuck trying to plug The Odd Couple, on another, Four for Texas. Other times, the expected film would not materialize, and Floyd would be forced to fill time. A particularly notable example of this was when the film Blood-Sucking Monkeys From West Mifflin, Pennsylvania failed to show up at the station in time for the show, so Count Floyd improvised the plot of the entire movie on his own.

Count Floyd's frustration with the poor quality of the films on Monster Chiller Horror Theatre would sometimes cause him to break character and explain to the kids that he usually had little say in which movies he could show because the station's cheap manager would buy blocks of films in which one or two good movies were "packaged" with several clunkers. His frustration was also shown in an episode in which he mistakenly re-emerged from his coffin before the end of the show (thinking the camera was off) muttering, "Damn, who the hell schedules these things?"

Count Floyd often tried to make a quick buck during the movie by selling gimmicky products (most often 3-D glasses) which would purportedly make the film seem more scary. Prices of these products would vary wildly, as though the figures were merely popping into his head as he promoted them by quoting "You gotta send...eighteen dollars...to me, Count Floyd..."

Monster Chiller Horror Theatre did show a wide selection of cheesy 3D horror films, including 3D House of Beef, 3D House of Slave Chicks, and Tip O'Neill's 3D House of Representatives ("house" in many of these titles suggesting the classic 3D film House of Wax). Most of the films starred Dr. Tongue (portrayed by John Candy) and his Igor-like assistant Bruno (portrayed by Eugene Levy). The 3D effect of the films usually consisted merely of the actors getting extremely close to the camera (equipped with a fisheye lens to grossly exaggerate perspective) and simply lunging the object of 3D emphasis back and forth at the lens. These objects included such non-scary items as a pen, a cat, a telephone directory, a person's face, a snifter of brandy and a plate of pancakes, as seen in Dr. Tongue's Evil House of Pancakes.

== Related works ==
During the Signals and Grace Under Pressure tours by Rush, a video played on the rear screen of Count Floyd introducing "The Weapon", “a scary song with real special effects” which could only be enjoyed if the listener was wearing 3D glasses. 3D glasses were actually given to the fans during the Toronto shows of the tours, most likely because these shows were filmed for the Grace Under Pressure tour video. An edited audio portion of the Count Floyd introduction was included on the single version of "The Weapon" that actually appeared on Rush’s Signals release of 1982.

One audio recording, Count Floyd (RCA MFL1-8501), was released in 1982 featuring tracks such as "Reggae Christmas Eve in Transylvania" and "The Gory Story of Duane and Debbie". This was the only SCTV related audio recording apart from the Bob and Doug McKenzie discography.

In 1987, Flaherty reprised his role as Count Floyd as an in-studio host for a free weekend preview of Cinemax (where SCTV had aired its final season in 1983-84). He would similarly reprise his role as Guy Caballero for a free preview weekend on Cinemax in 1988.

In 1988, new Count Floyd skits were made for the Hanna-Barbera cartoon The Completely Mental Misadventures of Ed Grimley, in which The Count Floyd Show was Ed Grimley’s favorite TV show that he never wanted to miss. In "Count Floyd's Scary Stories" (the only live-action segment of The Completely Mental Misadventures of Ed Grimley), Count Floyd would be seen in a television studio set attempting to entertain children (portrayed by various children stars at the time). This appeared to be more of a nod to Bozo the Clown than horror hosts he is used to mocking, possibly an additional factor to the boredom of the children he is shown performing for. In "Ed's Debut," Count Floyd explained to a boy that howled because his grandmother is part-werewolf. Joe Flaherty also portrayed Count Floyd's mother Mama Floyd. The same Ed Grimley segments were later re-run on Cartoon Planet, with introductions by Space Ghost, Zorak or Brak.

Count Floyd was also the pitchman for Canada's Wonderland when it launched "The Bat" roller coaster in 1987.

Count Floyd hosted the 1988 direct to video children's safety educational video Kid Safe: The Video, which also featured his SCTV co-star Andrea Martin.

In the Halloween episode of Flaherty's later show Freaks and Geeks he appears in a vampire costume and reprises the same voice in allusion, scaring away many young trick or treaters.

In 1990, Count Floyd released a how-to videotape called Making Real Funny Home Videos, ostensibly aimed at viewers who wanted to make America's Funniest Home Videos-style videos. The same year, Count Floyd appeared in a "Smoke Detectives" short where he assists some kids on how to teach fire safety to people.

Count Floyd also appeared in the original 1999 CBC Television film Must Be Santa.

In 2014, Count Floyd stars in The Wet Secrets music video "Nightlife" which pits the old school media vampire against today's glittery, new vampires in "Tweelight." This music video shows the mundane life of a vampire but allows the character to eventually take his revenge against modern, hipster vampires.
