= The Completely Mental Misadventures of Ed Grimley =

American animated series

- Genre: Animation/Live-action; Comedy; Satire
- Based on: Ed Grimley by Martin Short
- Developed by: Colossal Pictures, Inc.
- Directed by: Don Lusk; Paul Sommer; Bob Goe; Jim Drake (The Count Floyd Show)
- Starring: Martin Short; Joe Flaherty; (The Count Floyd Show); Catherine O'Hara
- Voices of: Martin Short; Joe Flaherty; Jonathan Winters; Andrea Martin; Catherine O'Hara
- Composer: Michael Tavera
- Country of origin: United States
- Original language: English
- No. of seasons: 1
- No. of episodes: 13

Production
- Executive producers: William Hanna; Joseph Barbera; Freddy Monnickendam; Martin Short
- Producers: Scott Shaw; John Hays; Mark Young (The Count Floyd Show)
- Editor: Gil Iverson
- Running time: 23 minutes
- Production companies: Hanna-Barbera Productions; SEPP International S.A.

Original release
- Network: NBC
- Release: September 10 – December 3, 1988

Related
- SCTV; Saturday Night Live

The Completely Mental Misadventures of Ed Grimley is an American animated television series produced by Hanna-Barbera Productions and featuring Martin Short's fictional character Ed Grimley (with Short reprising his role as Grimley). The show aired on NBC from September 10 to December 3, 1988 for a single season of 13 episodes. The show is the only Saturday morning animated adaptation of both an SCTV character and a Saturday Night Live character, and the first Saturday morning cartoon featuring an SCTV cast member (later joined by Camp Candy, featuring John Candy, and Rick Moranis's Gravedale High).

Guest stars on the show included Christopher Guest and SCTV alumni Eugene Levy and Dave Thomas. SCTV alum Joe Flaherty appeared regularly as Count Floyd. The show also featured the voices of René Auberjonois, Kenneth Mars, and Arte Johnson. Though the show was not renewed for a second season, The Completely Mental Misadventures of Ed Grimley was later seen in reruns in 1996 on Cartoon Network's unnamed pre-Adult Swim-era late-night programming block, which consisted of such shows as Space Ghost Coast to Coast and reruns of classic Looney Tunes shorts and Hanna-Barbera programming, before it was rerun again on Boomerang. The live-action Count Floyd segments were also recycled for use in episodes of Cartoon Planet (featuring many of the same characters as SGC2C and produced by the same team). Hanna-Barbera sponsored an Ed Grimley look-alike contest midway through the first season, which was won by 10-year-old Matt Mitchell from Des Moines, Iowa. MTV expressed interest in a second season, but budget issues shut down any further discussion.

== Synopsis and characters ==
Episodes of the show often featured Ed Grimley in several adventures, which start out as mundane, but turn very surreal and cartoonish, interspersed with science lessons from The Amazing Gustav Brothers, Roger and Emil, and a live-action segment with a "scary story" titled The Count Floyd Show presented as a show-within-a-show by Grimley's favorite television host, SCTV's Count Floyd (played by SCTV cast member Joe Flaherty).

Grimley's fellow cartoon characters included Grimley's landlord Leo Freebus (voiced by Jonathan Winters), Leo's wife Deidre (voiced by Andrea Martin), his ditzy, amateur actress neighbor Ms. Malone (voiced by Catherine O'Hara; a female character by the name of Ms. Malone did appear on an SNL version of an Ed Grimley sketch on the season ten episode hosted by Alex Karras, but Ms. Malone was played by that episode's musical guest Tina Turner), and her little brother Wendell (voiced by Danny Cooksey). Ed owns a goldfish named Moby and a clever pet rat named Sheldon (voiced by Frank Welker). At the end of each episode, Ed would write in his diary about what happened in his day.

== Additional voices ==
- Charlie Adler
- René Auberjonois
- Michael Bell
- Susan Blu
- Hamilton Camp
- Danny Cooksey
- Robert Ito
- Arte Johnson
- Christina Lange
- Kenneth Mars
- Rob Paulsen
- Dave Thomas
- B.J. Ward
- Frank Welker

== Episodes ==
No.	Title	Written by	Original release date
1	"Tall, Dark & Hansom"	N/A	September 10, 1988
Ed fills in for his cousin driving a hansom cab and ends up in a horse race. The Amazing Gustav Brothers: Roger and Emil talk about gravity where Emil demonstrates Sir Isaac Newton's discovery of gravity by jumping out of the airplane dressed as an apple. Though Emil forgets his parachute. Count Floyd's Scary Stories: Count Floyd reads to the children a story called "The Curse of the Headless Mummy" where an archaeologist named Dr. Smythe enters a tomb containing a headless mummy where hieroglyphics say "He who enters this tomb will never leave and be trapped for all of eternity."
2	"Ed's Debut"	Dick Blasucci	September 17, 1988
Ed mistakenly thinks he is asked to play triangle for the city's philharmonic. On the way to the concert hall, Grimley is arrested and imprisoned for a bank robbery he did not commit. The Amazing Gustav Brothers: Roger and Emil talk about centrifugal force by visiting the amusement park by going on the Screaming Banshee of Hades. Though Emil had some food before he got on and threw up. Count Floyd's Scary Stories: Count Floyd reads to the children a story about a little girl who went to visit her grandfather in Oklahoma who advised her not to go into the attic. When a kid asks if Count Floyd is a real vampire because of his howling, Count Floyd comments that his grandmother is a part-werewolf and it runs in the family. When he tries to turn into a bat, the spell Count Floyd uses makes him fat instead.
3	"E.G., Go Home"	N/A	September 24, 1988
Ed and Wendall, the annoying brother of his crush—a ditzy amateur actress named Miss Malone—go on an amusement park rocket ride, taking them to another planet which is ruled by an alien queen who sounds like Bette Davis. The Amazing Gustav Brothers: Roger and Emil talk about rocket propulsion where Emil wears a jetpack in an uninhabited desert that would make him zoom off into the stratosphere. Count Floyd's Scary Stories: In his imagination, Ed talks to Count Floyd apologizing for missing his show. Count Floyd decides to make an exception and rerun it for him. In the episode, Count Floyd reveals that he in his bat form starred in first-rate horror films before getting his own show. He shows his first flick he made called "Dr. Jekyll and Mr. Ed."
4	"Ed's in Hot Water"	Unknown	October 1, 1988
Looking after the apartment building for the Freebus family while she and her husband are on vacation, Ed tries to fix the water heater and ends up going down the drain, into the ocean, and on an island, where he finds a stranded, Amelia Earhart-esque aviator. The Amazing Gustav Brothers: Roger & Emil give a lecture on the whirlpool effect while sailing through the Devil's Triangle. Count Floyd's Scary Stories: Instead of reading a story, Count Floyd draws up an improvised story that takes place inside Dead Man's Cave.
5	"Crate Expectations"	N/A	October 8, 1988
Ed gets trapped in a crate while trying to get a birthday present for Miss Malone. Meanwhile in a spoof of It's a Wonderful Life, Miss Malone is depressed over being passed up for a TV movie and being a struggling actress at 25. She meets a guardian angel named Jim who shows her what life would be like if she was never born. The Amazing Gustav Brothers: Roger and Emil go back in time to their childhood where they had a disagreement when in the bathtub. Count Floyd's Scary Stories: Count Floyd shows some super-scary home movies. Then he plays a preview from next week's movie called "The Spooky Cloud in the Middle of the Swamp."
6	"Grimley, P.F.C."	Unknown	October 15, 1988
In the wrong line to return a library book, Ed joins the Army and ends up second banana to a Bob Hope-like USO performer (voiced by Dave Thomas). The Amazing Gustav Brothers: The brothers are about to give a lecture, but get interrupted when a wrecking ball accidentally destroys the office. Count Floyd's Scary Stories: Count Floyd is selling a best-of video that contains his first episode from the 1960s.
7	"Moby Is Lost"	Unknown	October 22, 1988
Ed's pet goldfish Moby is missing and Ed hires a television-obsessed sea captain to lead the search. The Amazing Gustav Brothers: No Lecture. Just the brothers feeling bad about Ed's situation. Count Floyd's Scary Stories: Count Floyd reads "Revenge of the Ghost Chicken". The show is then reviewed by a very young Siskel and Ebert. Count Floyd takes offence at their hatred towards it.
8	"Good Neighbor Ed"	Unknown	October 29, 1988
Ed wins a contest but to fulfill the contest rules he needs to take a picture of all of his neighbors. This is the only musical episode. The Amazing Gustav Brothers: Roger & Emil give a lecture on elasticity on a football field. Count Floyd's Scary Stories: Count Floyd brings in a guest, Skippy High, hoping he'd sing scary songs to the kids. But Skippy's songs are the opposite.
9	"Driver Ed"	Unknown	November 5, 1988
Miss Malone needs to learn how to drive and calls upon Ed to teach her, but an accident turns the two into wandering spirits who haunt Mr. Freebus. The Amazing Gustav Brothers: Roger & Emil try to give a lecture on Newton's Third Law while playing baseball with their mother. Count Floyd's Scary Stories: Count Floyd shares a story from his favorite childhood comic book entitled "The Chiller Spooky Next Door Neighbor", which his mother still forbids him from reading.
10	"Blowin' in the Wind"	Unknown	November 12, 1988
While on his way to his aunt's house for a game of Monopoly, Ed is caught up in the same tornado that sent Dorothy Gale to the Land of Oz, only he ends up on the farm with Aunt Em, Uncle Henry, and a recuperating Dorothy where a traveling summer stock show, with a Jerry Lewis-like director, are hoping for a shot at Broadway. The Amazing Gustav Brothers: Roger & Emil give a lecture on aerodynamics during a flight in a giant paper airplane to a volcanic island. Count Floyd's Scary Stories: Count Floyd improvises a story using a travel brochure while the kids play with a homemade voodoo doll of Count Floyd.
11	"Eyewitness Ed"	Unknown	November 19, 1988
Needing "hot dog franks" for a party, Ed makes a run to the store which resembles the Bates Motel and witnesses Der Bingle robbing the proprietor (voiced by Eugene Levy) for which he testifies and must go into the Witness Protection Program. The Amazing Gustav Brothers: Instead of giving a lecture, Roger & Emil play hooky and go to the circus, only to get caught by their mother, who works there. Count Floyd's Scary Stories: Count Floyd shows the kids a 3D movie entitled "The Oozing Killer Slime Monster".
12	"Eddy, We Hardly Knew Ye"	Unknown	November 26, 1988
Ed goes into the hospital for a tonsillectomy, where his roommate is a werewolf (voiced by Christopher Guest). The Amazing Gustav Brothers: Roger & Emil give a lecture on tonsillectomies from inside an actual mouth. Count Floyd's Scary Stories: Count Floyd tells a story about a 50-foot potato monster. After the story, Count Floyd gets to know some kids from his audience, including a young Ed.
13	"The Irving Who Came to Dinner"	Unknown	December 3, 1988
Irving Cohen pays a visit and helps Ed reveal a couple of hucksters. The Amazing Gustav Brothers: Roger & Emil give a lecture on vacuum cleaners. Count Floyd's Scary Stories: Count Floyd read the kids "The Prince, The Witch & Some Other People Too," realizing after that it's from a fairy tale book instead his usual book.

== Home media and Syndication ==
On January 29, 2013, Warner Home Video (through the Warner Archive) released The Completely Mental Misadventures of Ed Grimley: The Complete Series on DVD in region 1 as part of their Hanna-Barbera Classic Collection. This is a Manufacture-on-Demand (MOD) release, available exclusively through Warner's online store, MoviesUnlimited.com, and Amazon.com. In addition, the episode "Tall, Dark & Hansom" is available on Warners' Saturday Morning Cartoons: 1980s Volume 1 DVD set, released on May 4, 2010.

As mentioned above, Cartoon Network and Boomerang (both in the United States and overseas) have aired reruns of this show in the 1990s. As of 2025, reruns of The Completely Mental Misadventures of Ed Grimley air on MeTV Toons as part of their weekend line-up.

== See also ==
- List of works produced by Hanna-Barbera Productions
- Recurring Saturday Night Live characters and sketches
