= Earl Camembert =

Fictional character

Earl Camembert (pronounced "cannon-bare") is a fictional news reporter and anchorman portrayed by Eugene Levy on the Canadian sketch comedy show SCTV, which aired in the 1970s and 1980s.

== Career ==
Camembert was named after Canadian broadcaster Earl Cameron and camembert cheese. He was a recurring character alongside Joe Flaherty's character of Floyd Robertson; the two co-anchored the SCTV Network's "SCTV News" program.

Camembert always appeared with thick-rimmed eyeglasses and a checkered suit with matching bow tie, along with his black hair in a Jewfro style. Robertson, who was portrayed as the respectable, well-dressed anchorman, reported major news stories (often including wars and disasters involving the semi-fictional African nation of Togoland), while Camembert was stuck with frivolous items.

The two characters' on-air friction is caused not only by the differences in their journalistic credentials, but also their status at the TV station. While Robertson receives a lucrative six-figure salary to anchor the evening news, Camembert is paid union scale and must anchor and host a number of news programs from early morning to late in the evening. As it is, his poor journalistic skills tend to indicate he is fortunate to be employed at all; for instance, one interview with Melonville mayor Tommy Shanks ended poorly, with the mayor becoming so enraged that he immediately stormed the studio to assault Camembert on air.

However, on occasions when Robertson was drunk (more frequently during the later years of the show), he would tend to have to try and stick to the news while his co-anchor was inebriated; on another occasion, Robertson was among the station staff who were being mind-controlled by the alien Zontar via mind-altering cabbages, with Earl (who had not been placed under Zontar's control) being confused and irritated by Robertson's state and frequent references to Zontar.

Camembert also often presented editorials, which earned Robertson's scorn. In one episode, Robertson laughed through Camembert's entire piece. Camembert's editorials were usually followed by his signature on screen, which appeared scribbled and disorganized. Camembert headed the election campaign for SCTV personality Johnny La Rue (played by John Candy) during the Melonville town elections, ignoring the principle of journalistic neutrality. After La Rue was soundly defeated, Camembert was fired by La Rue. Robertson then informed Camembert that he would be reported for his journalistic violations.

Like Robertson who also appeared as Count Floyd on "Monster Chiller Horror Theater," Camembert also "doubled up" at SCTV, but his ventures were less than successful. One of his earliest "other" gigs was as host of a children's television series, "The Uncle Earl Show," but that show was cancelled. His next attempt at a "regular" show was a news magazine-type program, "60/20" (a spoof of both 60 Minutes and 20/20), and he also hosted an edition of SCTV's attempt at its own sketch comedy series, "Thursday Night Live." His longest-running series was a show in the vein of PM Magazine, "One on the Town," but that effort too was short-lived. Towards the end of SCTV's run, Camembert became the final host of that station's version of Dialing for Dollars.

== Personal life ==
Earl Camembert was the son of a former SCTV station manager, Merle Camembert (also played by Levy), who had a reputation for buckling under to the slightest pressure, as during an early 1950s McCarthyist hearing when he "named names" of alleged Communists, including his own mother (and Earl's grandmother).

Camembert also has one son, Earl Junior (played by the real-life nephew of John Candy, Donald Cowper), who tried to fill in for Camembert in one episode due to Robertson's tardiness. Typical of Robertson's crassness, upon returning to the studio, he bullied the younger Camembert, who looked identical to his father.

Levy's portrayal of Camembert made him a sympathetic figure in light of Robertson's success and his mistreatment of Camembert.
