= Floyd Robertson =

Fictional news anchor from the TV series SCTV

Floyd Robertson is a fictional news anchor and reporter, portrayed by Joe Flaherty on the Canadian sketch comedy series SCTV in the 1970s and 1980s. He was a co-anchor, with Earl Camembert (another fictional newscaster, played by Eugene Levy), of the SCTV News. In addition, he doubled as the long-running horror host Count Floyd on Monster Chiller Horror Theatre.

== As news anchor ==
Floyd Robertson's name was originally derived from that of CBC news anchor Lloyd Robertson. Shortly after Floyd Robertson debuted, Lloyd Robertson changed networks, and became the longtime CTV National News anchor. Other than the name and occupation, the character shares no real similarities with the Canadian news anchor; in fact, Flaherty largely modeled Floyd's persona as news anchor after Pittsburgh TV news legend Bill Burns.

Floyd Robertson was presented as the respectable, well-dressed member of SCTV's news team, who reported on the important national and international news stories (including a series of natural disasters in the semi-fictional African nation of Togoland); while the bespectacled, nerdy and obliviously self-important Earl Camembert – dressed in loud checkered jackets and matching bow ties, and his black hair in a semi-afro style – was stuck with the more trivial and frivolous items (such as a fire at a doily factory). Besides the difference in journalistic credentials, Robertson's lucrative annual six-figure salary was a sore point with Camembert, who was paid only union scale and was forced to anchor or co-anchor all of SCTV's newscasts from sign-on to sign-off.

When not informing viewers of the news of the day, Robertson served as a straight man to Camembert's antics, including playing tape music to accompany news items he was reading, or doing an entire newscast while under the influence of marijuana, or eating dinner on the set during a newscast, or filing a report from a recently opened local delicatessen when he was supposed to travel to New Delhi, India, or entering the set on roller skates and wearing what Robertson aptly called "Jimmy McNichol hand-me-downs." More significantly, after Camembert served as campaign manager for the ultimately unsuccessful political run of SCTV personality Johnny La Rue (played by John Candy), Robertson announced on the air that his colleague was being reported for violations of journalistic ethics and election laws, and for conflict of interest.

Robertson had particular scorn for Camembert's editorials, on one occasion laughing throughout his co-anchor's piece. Another time, when Camembert gave a particularly outrageous editorial in which he made disparaging remarks about women newscasters, Robertson coldly informed him that, if given the chance to co-anchor with a woman, he would drop Camembert in a heartbeat.

On some occasions, Robertson pushed his luck with Camembert. At the end of one newscast where Robertson made fun of his co-anchor's unorthodox pronunciation of his surname, the ill-humored Camembert responded by punching him in the jaw. Another time, when Camembert was in severe pain from an impacted wisdom tooth, Robertson decided to make him laugh by ending the newscast with a humorous item about a man and his wife visiting a pet shop. Robertson, however, kept pushing the punch line to the point where Camembert, at the end, went for his throat. On one of the few occasions where SCTV News had commercials, the sponsor was a toy company run by Robertson himself, whose only product line was the "Mr. Earl" doll (which was clearly patterned after Camembert, and also a spoof of Saturday Night Live's Mr. Bill). The ad so enraged Camembert that he abruptly cancelled an editorial he planned to give about friendship, and at the end of the newscast once again lunged at Robertson.

Robertson's disdain for Camembert extended to his son, Earl Junior, who when trying his hand at co-anchoring a newscast was bullied mercilessly by Robertson. But Camembert was not the only colleague to be subjected to Robertson's wrath: When Walter Cronkite (as impersonated by Dave Thomas), filling in for Camembert one night, fabricated a "big story" about an explosion at a laundromat, Robertson snapped at him as well.

At least one sketch implicitly suggested that Robertson, in addition to co-anchoring the SCTV News, was also the station's news director (a common practice in the earlier years of television). After SCTV's resident foreigner, Pirini Scleroso (played by Andrea Martin), botched a taped field report, Camembert pointedly reminded Robertson that he was responsible for her being hired as a reporter in the first place.

=== Post-1981 ===
After SCTV was picked up by the American television network NBC in 1981 (as SCTV Network 90), Robertson was turned into an alcoholic who veered between being on the wagon and falling off it. This new reputation became such that in the "Zontar" episode (series 4, cycle 2, episode 3), in which Robertson was among the SCTV personalities who fell under Zontar's spell, Camembert (who wasn't affected) assumed that his colleague was once again anchoring under the influence.

== As Count Floyd ==
Robertson also had a long run as Count Floyd on the movie series Monster Chiller Horror Theatre. The humor derived not only from the fact that the movies shown were extremely cheesy and anything but scary, but also that Floyd's definition of what was scary differed significantly from what was intended for the juvenile audience that was Monster Chiller Horror Theatre's target. For example, at the end of the screening of the Swedish existentialist drama Whispers of the Wolf, Floyd asked, "You think it's not scary to be depressed?" After weakly defending the film, Floyd would then usually admit that the film wasn't scary ("All right, it wasn't scary!"), but promise that next week's film would be really scary.

There were three SCTV episodes where it was made evident who was the man occupying the vampire costume and makeup, mock Transylvanian vampire accent, and frequent werewolf howl. The first time was in the very first edition of Monster Chiller Horror Theatre (from series 1, episode 18), where it was clearly mentioned in the opening credits: "With Floyd Robertson as Count Floyd." During one newscast, Earl gave a heartfelt testimonial to Robertson, mentioning that in addition to his news career, he had delighted children for years as Count Floyd. Another was in the very last edition of SCTV News (from series 6, episode 17), where an obviously inebriated Robertson showed up late to the newscast after a Monster Chiller Horror Theatre taping, still wearing his Count Floyd makeup. During that broadcast, he announced that Monster Chiller Horror Theatre's sound engineer was retiring, thus completely upstaging Camembert's announcement that he was retiring from the newscast.

The dual role of Robertson / Count Floyd is a reference to the formerly common practice in television for on-air staff to also serve as the host of a kiddie/cartoon show. Many local weathermen or announcers would wear a costume and host a cartoon show or even a horror show, as Floyd did.
