= Mary Charlotte Wilcox =

Canadian retired actress and minister (born 1947)

- Born: October 29, 1947 (age 78); London, Ontario, Canada
- Occupations: Actress writer minister
- Years active: 1969–1994

Mary Charlotte Wilcox (born October 29, 1947) is a Canadian retired actress, writer and minister. After working on stage at Second City in Toronto, Wilcox was initially hired as a writer on the sketch show SCTV (where she won an Emmy for her writing work). She also appeared as a recurring player on the show. She later was one of the stars of (and occasional writer for) the TV series Maniac Mansion, which was largely creatively run by various SCTV players and writers.

Wilcox transitioned out of acting by the end of 1990s, studying to become a minister. She served in that capacity at St. John the Evangelist Church in Edmonton, Alberta in the early 2000s

== Early years ==
Wilcox was born in London, Ontario, and raised there.

== Career ==
Wilcox's most prominent role was as a recurring player in the fifth and sixth seasons of SCTV, She has also appeared in the film Strange Brew (1983), and Maniac Mansion.

After she left acting, Wilcox worked as a secretary in a law office and eventually became a minister in the Anglican Church, serving at St. John the Evangelist Church in Edmonton, Alberta in the early 2000s. (Though SCTV had filmed episodes in Edmonton in 1980 and '81, Wilcox was not part that iteration of SCTV. She joined SCTV as a writer and recurring player in 1982, by which time the show had permanently moved back to Toronto.)
