= Second City Television =

Canadian television sketch comedy show

- Also known as: Second City TV (1976–1981); SCTV Network 90 (1981–1983); SCTV Channel (1983–1984)
- Genre: Sketch comedy
- Developed by: Bernard Sahlins; Andrew Alexander
- Starring: John Candy; Robin Duke; Joe Flaherty; Eugene Levy; Andrea Martin; Rick Moranis; Catherine O'Hara; Harold Ramis; Tony Rosato; Martin Short; Dave Thomas
- Country of origin: Canada
- Original language: English
- No. of seasons: 6
- No. of episodes: 135 (List of episodes)

Production
- Running time: 30 minutes (1976–1981); 90 minutes (1981–1983); 45 minutes (1983–1984)

Original release
- Network: Global (1976–1979); CBC (1980–1983); Superchannel (1983–1984)
- Release: September 21, 1976 – July 17, 1984

Second City Television, commonly shortened to SCTV and later known as SCTV Network 90 (the NBC version) and SCTV Channel (the Cinemax version), is a Canadian television sketch comedy show that ran intermittently between 1976 and 1984 about a fictional television station. It was created as an offshoot of Toronto's Second City troupe. It moved to American television, where it aired on NBC from 1981 to 1983.

== Premise ==
The show's premise is the broadcast day of a fictitious TV station (later network) in the town of Melonville. Melonville's location is left unspecified; the earliest episodes imply it is in Canada, but most later episodes place it in the U.S.

A typical episode of SCTV presents a compendium of programming seen on the station throughout its broadcast day. A given episode could contain SCTV news broadcasts, sitcoms, dramas, movies, talk shows, children's shows, advertising send-ups hawking fictitious products, and game shows. Several "shows" are seen regularly on SCTV, including SCTV News; soap opera The Days of the Week; late-night movie features Monster Chiller Horror Theater and Dialing For Dollars; and Great White North (a public access show centered around two Canadian 'hosers'), among others. Many other SCTV shows are seen only once, such as the game show Shoot at the Stars, in which celebrities are literally shot at like shooting gallery targets, or full-blown movie spoofs such as Play It Again, Bob, in which Woody Allen (Rick Moranis) tries to get Bob Hope (Dave Thomas) to star in his next film. Episodes also feature a range of SCTV-produced promotions (for imaginary future shows) and commercials, such as spots for "Al Peck's Used Fruit" or "Shower in a Briefcase", or a public service announcement that helpfully describes "Seven Signs You May Already Be Dead".

Also seen fairly frequently, particularly in later episodes, are behind-the-scenes plots focusing on life at the station/network. These often feature Guy Caballero (Joe Flaherty), SCTV's cheap, tyrannical owner and president who, despite being perfectly ambulatory, uses a wheelchair to earn "respect" (i.e., sympathy) from employees and viewers. Also seen regularly are weaselly, sweating station manager Maurice "Moe" Green (Harold Ramis), succeeded in the position by flamboyant, leopard-skin clad, foul-mouthed Edith Prickley (Andrea Martin); vain variety star Johnny LaRue (John Candy); washed-up entertainers such as singer Lola Heatherton (Catherine O'Hara) and comedian Bobby Bittman (Eugene Levy); news anchors Floyd Robertson (Flaherty) and Earl Camembert (Levy), talk-show host Sammy Maudlin (Flaherty), cult-stardom-destined and beer-addled brothers Bob and Doug McKenzie (Moranis and Thomas), and many others.

The small cast, typically six to eight members at any given time, play a wide variety of other station roles ranging from program hosts to commercial spokespersons. They also impersonate numerous popular celebrities appearing on the station's programming.

== Cast ==
Actor	Seasons					
Actor	1	2	3	4	5	6
John Candy	Main	Main		Main	Main	Guest
Joe Flaherty	Main	Main	Main	Main	Main	Main
Eugene Levy	Main	Main	Main	Main	Main	Main
Andrea Martin	Main	Main	Main	Main	Main	Main
Catherine O'Hara	Main	Main		Main	Main	Recurring
Harold Ramis	Main	Recurring			Guest	
Dave Thomas	Main (Note: Only starred in and was credited for the first two episodes of Season 5)	Main	Main	Main	Main	Recurring
Robin Duke			Main			
Rick Moranis			Main	Main	Main	
Tony Rosato			Main			
Martin Short				Featuring (Note: Only starred in and was credited for the final episode)	Main	Main

=== Main ===
These are the show's main cast and recurring characters they played:

- John Candy as Johnny LaRue/Dr. Tongue/William B. Williams/Billy Sol Hurok/TommyShanks/Gil Fisher/Yosh Shmenge/Harry/Steve Roman/Mr. Messenger/Mr. Mambo/Doctor Braino/Boris Burgess/Paul Fistinyourface/Dan Ellsmire/Stephan Seely/Dr. William Wainwright/Orson Welles/Luciano Pavarotti/Divine/Curly Howard/Richard Burton/Julia Child/Darryl Sittler/Tip O'Neil/Herve Villechaize/Jimmy "the Greek" Snyder/Darren Peel (seasons 1–2, 4–5, guest season 6)
- Joe Flaherty as Floyd Robertson aka Count Floyd/Guy Caballero/Sammy Maudlin/Big Jim McBob/Vic Hedges/Alki Stereopolis/Norman Gorman/Hugh Betcha/Duard Weese/Arthur Andrew-Leggett/Phillip Marks/Dick Bedlow/Rocco/Slade Cantrell/Gregory Peck/Peter O'Toole/Kirk Douglas/Charlton Heston/Bing Crosby/William F. Buckley/Geraldo Rivera/Charles Bronson/Alan Alda/Gene Siskel/Richard Nixon/Jack Klugman/Slim Whitman/Larry Fine/Salvador Dalí
- Eugene Levy as Earl Camembert/Gus Gustofferson/Bobby Bittman/Woody Tobias Jr./Mel Slirrup/Sid Dithers/Brian Johns/Stan Shmenge/Joel Weiss/Al Peck/Alex Trebel/Dr. Rawl Withers/Raoul Wilson/Lou Jaffe/Murray Shulman/Max Lansky/Phil the Garment King/Stan Kanter/Crazy Hy/Paul Rey/Don Mills/Dougall Currie/Dr. Elliot Sabian/Henry Kissinger/Ricardo Montalban/Floyd the Barber/Jack Carter/Milton Berle/Gene Shalit/Howard Cosell/Ralph Young
- Andrea Martin as Edith Prickely/Perini Scleroso/Edna Boil/Dr. Cheryl Kinsey/Libby Wolfson/Yolanda Devillbis/Mrs. Falbo/Dutch Leonard/Big Momma/Melba the Disco Queen/Cassie Mackerel/Kathy Tudor/Tawny Beaver/Blanche Ray Kellogg/Sondra Wicks/Remy Martin/Maggie Butterfield/Mojo/May Madlock/Barbra Streisand/Lorna Minelli/Indira Gandhi/Mother Theresa/Joyce Dewitt/Arlene Francis/Sophia Loren/Ethel Merman/Marsha Mason/Charo
- Catherine O'Hara as Lola Heatherton/Maureen Wallace/Sue Bopper Simpson/Dusty Towne/Trish Nutly/Nikki/Phyllis Gumble/Sister Mary Innocent/Katherine Timber/Alexis Shannon/Sue Ellen/Violet McKay/Betty Wilson/Katharine Hepburn/Elizabth Taylor/Brooke Shields/Morgan Fairchild/Rona Barrett (season 1–2, 4–5, recurring season 6)
- Harold Ramis as Moe Green/Swami Banananda (season 1, recurring season 2, guest season 5)
- Dave Thomas as Doug McKenzie/Bill Needle/Angus Crock/Lin Ye Tang/Tex Boil/Harvey K-Tel/Fred Scutz/Tim Ishimuni/Keith Hampshire/Ernest Kirsch/Mel McElroy/Ted Gordon/Bob Wilson/William Morris/Captain Combat/Zach Harrington/Bob Hope/Walter Cronkite/Richard Harris/DeForest Kelly/G. Gordon Liddy/Liberace/Michael Caine/Gerry Brown/Roger Ebert/Neil Simon/John Ritter/Colonel Sanders (seasons 1–4, first two episodes of season 5, recurring season 6)
- Robin Duke as Molly Earle/Shelley Winters (season 3)
- Rick Moranis Bob McKenzie/Gerry Todd/Skip Bittman/Carl Scutz/Rabbi Karlov/Mr. Wilcox/Larry Siegel/Tom Monroe/Linsk Minyk/Clay Collins/David Brinkley/Woody Allen/Merv Griffin/George Carlin/Dick Cavett/Al Waxman/Michael McDonald/Brent Musburger/Teri Shields (seasons 3–4, first two episodes of season 5)
- Tony Rosato as Marcello Sebastiano/Chick Monk/Lou Costello/Tony Orlando/Ella Fitzgerald (season 3)
- Martin Short as Ed Grimley/Jackie Rogers Jr./Brock Linehan/Irving Cohen/Bradley P. Allen/Troy Soren/Jackie Rogers Sr./Rusty Van Reddick/Lawrence Orbach/Lional Napier-Humphries/Billy McKay/Cheaplaffs Johnson/Jerry Lewis/Pierre Trudeau/David Steinberg/The Kid from Deliverance/Dustin Hoffman/Montgomery Clift/Tony Sandler/Howie Soozloff/Fred Rogers (featuring last episode of season 4, main cast seasons 5–6)

=== Recurring ===
- John Stocker as Announcer [V.O.] (seasons 2–6)
- Donald Cowper as Various (season 1)
- Jayne Eastwood as Various (seasons 1, 5–6)
- Jeff Lumby as Various (seasons 2–3)
- Ron James as Various (seasons 2–6)
- Paul Flaherty as Wally Hung/Various (seasons 3–6)
- Dick Blasucci as Various (seasons 3–5)
- Juul Haalmeyer as Various (seasons 4–5)
- Mary Charlotte Wilcox as Idella Voudry/Janet Halsey/Various (seasons 5–6)
- Mike Short as Mike the Bartender/Various (seasons 5–6)
- John Hemphill as Happy Marsden/Wesley Wilks/Various (season 6)
- John McAndrew as Various (season 6)

== History ==
=== Show creation ===
There is much dispute as to who actually created the SCTV series. The show itself bears no "created by" credit, although it gives "developed by" credits to Bernard Sahlins and Andrew Alexander.

In 1974, Andrew Alexander bought the Canadian rights to The Second City for one dollar, and in 1976, he was the producer of Toronto's stage show, and was looking to expand his company into TV. He called together the current cast of the stage show (including Candy, Flaherty, Thomas, and Levy) to discuss a format for a Second City TV series. Also in attendance at the meeting were Second City veterans Harold Ramis, Sheldon Patinkin, and Del Close, along with business partner Bernard Sahlins.

According to Dave Thomas's account in SCTV: Behind The Scenes, various ideas were batted around, then — and here is where meeting attendees remember things differently — either Close or Patinkin came up with the idea of presenting programming from the world's smallest TV station. The cast immediately jumped on the idea as a workable model for presenting a virtually unlimited range of characters, sketches, and ideas, while still having a central premise that tied everything together. From there, the actual content of the show (the characters, the situations, the Melonville setting, etc.) was all the work of the cast, with contributions from Alexander and Sahlins.

Alexander remained as producer and executive producer throughout SCTV's run. Sahlins stayed for the first two seasons as a producer. Patinkin was a first-season writer and de facto editor and post-production supervisor. Close had no further involvement with the series.

=== Seasons 1 and 2: 1976–1979 ===
SCTV began production in 1976 at the Toronto-based studios of the Global Television Network, a small regional channel simulcasting through southern Ontario. For the first six episodes, new episodes were seen once a month. The next seven new episodes (beginning in February 1977, and continuing through the spring) aired biweekly. In September, Global ordered 13 more episodes, which aired weekly from September through December.

These irregularly scheduled 26 episodes (produced over 15 months) were later considered one "season" for syndication purposes. Except for Harold Ramis, all of the original cast was from the Toronto branch of The Second City theatre improvisation troupe; Ramis was a Second City veteran, but with the Chicago troupe.

The original SCTV cast consisted of John Candy, Joe Flaherty, Eugene Levy, Andrea Martin, Catherine O'Hara, Harold Ramis, and Dave Thomas. All also served as writers on the show, although Martin and O'Hara did not receive writing credits on the first four episodes. Ramis served as SCTV's original head writer, but only appeared on-screen as a regular during the first season (spread out over two years) and in a few select episodes in the second season before his main character, station manager Moe Greene, was written out. Ramis and Flaherty also served as associate producers. Sahlins produced the show; Global staffer Milad Bessada produced and directed the first 13 episodes. George Bloomfield became director as of episode 14.

Concurrently with the first year of SCTV, every cast member except Ramis also worked as a regular performer on another Canadian TV show. Several (Flaherty, Candy, Thomas, and Martin) worked together as regulars on The David Steinberg Show, which premiered on the CTV Television Network and in American syndication the same week as SCTV. The David Steinberg Show—which also featured future SCTV cast member Martin Short, but did not use any of the SCTV cast as writers—folded after a single season. Martin, Flaherty, and Levy were also cast members of the short-lived comedy/variety series The Sunshine Hour, which finished its run less than a month before SCTV premiered (and while the first SCTV episode was being filmed).

During the first season, Levy was also doing double duty; in addition to his work on SCTV, he was also a cast member of the CBC sketch comedy series Stay Tuned, which aired weekly from October 1976 through January 1977. At the same time SCTV debuted, Candy and O'Hara became regular cast members of the CBC comedy series Coming Up Rosie. This gave Candy the distinction of appearing as a regular on three TV series simultaneously, on three different Canadian networks.

For the second season (1978–79), SCTV became a weekly series on Global, and was seen in syndication throughout Canada and parts of the United States. After episode three of the second season, Ramis was no longer in the cast, but continued to receive credit as the show's head writer for most of the season.

=== Season 3: 1980–1981 ===
In 1980, one year after the Toronto Global television station dropped SCTV due to high production costs, show producer Andrew Alexander negotiated a deal to produce SCTV at CITV facilities, with Edmonton, Alberta broadcaster Charles Allard, owner of the independent station CITV-TV and the Allarcom studios.

Candy, O'Hara, and Ramis dropped out at this point (Candy for his own show, Big City Comedy, on CTV), and Dave Thomas was promoted to head writer. Added to the cast (and writing room) were Tony Rosato, Robin Duke, and Rick Moranis. Moranis, a friend of Dave Thomas, then known as a radio personality in Canada, was the only cast member not to have come from the ranks of The Second City. John Blanchard became the series director.

This season of the show was seen in Canada on the CBC, and in scattered American markets in syndication.

=== Seasons 4 and 5: 1981–1983 ===
In May 1981, NBC picked up SCTV in a 90-minute format as a presumably inexpensive replacement for the canceled weekly Friday late-night musical variety show The Midnight Special, enabling the Canadian sketch comedy show to air nationally in the United States. This occurred mainly because NBC had practically no time to prepare and develop a new American-produced program in the light of Midnight Special producer Dick Ebersol's emergency return to Saturday Night Live, which he had co-created with Lorne Michaels in 1975 and was now returning to in an effort to save it from cancellation. SCTV functioned as a solution to a scheduling bind for NBC, but was a temporary two-year fix.

Less than two months after season three ended, SCTV was back on the air for season four, airing on NBC first as SCTV Network 90, then simply as SCTV Network, late Friday nights (early Saturday mornings) at 12:30 a.m./11:30 p.m. Central. For this iteration, Rosato and Duke dropped out (ending up as cast members of SNL during its rebuilding years following Jean Doumanian's stint as producer [see above]), and Candy and O'Hara returned. Because of the rush to generate material for the 90-minute format, several early season-four episodes consisted partially or entirely of sketches broadcast during seasons one to three. Ramis, Duke, and Rosato appeared in many of these sketches, uncredited and usually as extras or bit players (sketches in which they played a focal character were not featured in these repeats).

Season four (25 episodes) was broadcast irregularly from May 1981 to July 1982. Beginning in January 1982, ending the year-and-a-half stay in Edmonton, production of the series returned to Toronto where it would stay for the remainder of its run.

Writer/performer Martin Short joined the cast at the end of season four, taping three episodes before O'Hara, Thomas, and Moranis left; one of those episodes was aired as the season-four finale in July 1982; the other two were held for the start of season five (14 episodes), which began in October 1982. For the remaining 12 episodes of season five, the cast of Candy, Flaherty, Levy, Martin, and Short was augmented by supporting players John Hemphill, Ron James and Mary Charlotte Wilcox, none of whom became an official cast member. Also, during season five, Ramis and O'Hara returned for one episode each as guest stars.

The last original SCTV episode for NBC was broadcast in March 1983, with reruns continuing through June. For both seasons four and five, the show continued to air on the CBC in Canada as only an hour in length, edited down from the 90-minute NBC broadcasts.

The 90-minute NBC episodes were released in a series of DVD sets in 2004 and 2005, and selected sketches are also available in 90-minute collections.

=== Season 6: 1983–1984 ===
In the fall of 1983, NBC wanted the late Friday-night time slot for the new Friday Night Videos; SCTV, despite its unexpected popularity among younger American audiences, was not a high priority with the network and essentially acted as a placeholder for two years while NBC reevaluated its late-night programming strategies. SCTV was offered a slot on early Sunday evenings by NBC (presumably 7 p.m./6 Central), but because the producers would have had to alter the show's content to appeal to "family" audiences (per a 1975 amendment to the Prime Time Access Rule), as well as face CBS's dominant 60 Minutes (against which several NBC shows had failed since the 1981 cancellation of The Wonderful World of Disney), they declined.

Instead, for its final season, the show moved to the premium cable channels Superchannel in Canada and Cinemax in the United States, changing the name slightly to SCTV Channel. The running time was now 45 minutes, and new episodes (18 in total) were seen on alternating weeks from November 1983 to July 1984. For this final season, the cast consisted solely of Flaherty, Levy, Martin, and Short, although Candy, Thomas, and O'Hara all made guest appearances. Writer/performers Hemphill and Wilcox once again appeared semi-regularly.

After the show went out of production, several SCTV characters continued to make appearances on Cinemax, with Flaherty reprising his roles as Count Floyd and Guy Caballero during free preview weekends in 1987 and 1988, and Bobby Bittman appearing in a standalone special chronicling his life and career under the Cinemax Comedy Experiment banner. Short, meanwhile, carried the Ed Grimley persona over to Saturday Night Live for its 10th season and later incorporated it into an animated series, The Completely Mental Misadventures of Ed Grimley, which also included Count Floyd.

=== The Best of SCTV: 1988 ===
On September 21, 1988, ABC aired a one-time special called The Best of SCTV. In the special, Flaherty and Martin returned as Caballero and Prickley. The two presented a look back at SCTV (using flashbacks) as they tried to convince the FCC to renew their license. A slightly different version aired in Canada, wherein the pair make their arguments to the CRTC; this necessitated a few changes to certain lines of dialogue and on-screen text, but the show content was otherwise identical. This special was ordered during the 1988 Writers Guild of America strike and was not repeated.

=== Packaging into different lengths ===
The earliest three seasons, in Canada, were 30 minutes. NBC broadcast two seasons of 90-minute programs, including at the beginning material from the Canadian seasons. Some of these 90-minute shows were abbreviated to 60 minutes for the Canadian market. After the end of the NBC seasons, the material was repackaged into 30-minute shows.

== Reception ==
SCTV received mostly positive reviews. Following the first episode, Margaret Daly of the Toronto Star wrote, "Global TV may have just pulled off the comedy coup of this season ... the concept is as clever as the loony company members." During its first season, Dennis Braithwaite of the Star wrote that SCTV was "delightfully funny and inventive" and "the best satire seen regularly on North American television. No, I haven't forgotten NBC's Saturday Night." After it premiered on network TV in the US, Newsday's Marvin Kitman wrote, "The premiere episode was quite simply the most superb half hour comedy…in a long time." "SCTV is witty, grown-up, inventive and uproariously funny," Gary Deeb wrote in the Chicago Sun-Times.

SCTV is far from perfect—there are too many meandering remarks addressed directly to the camera, and the musical interludes tend to turn mossy—but it's the only entertainment show on TV that matters, that goes beyond comedy to create a loopily affectionate world of its own.

—James Wolcott, January 10, 1983

== Awards ==
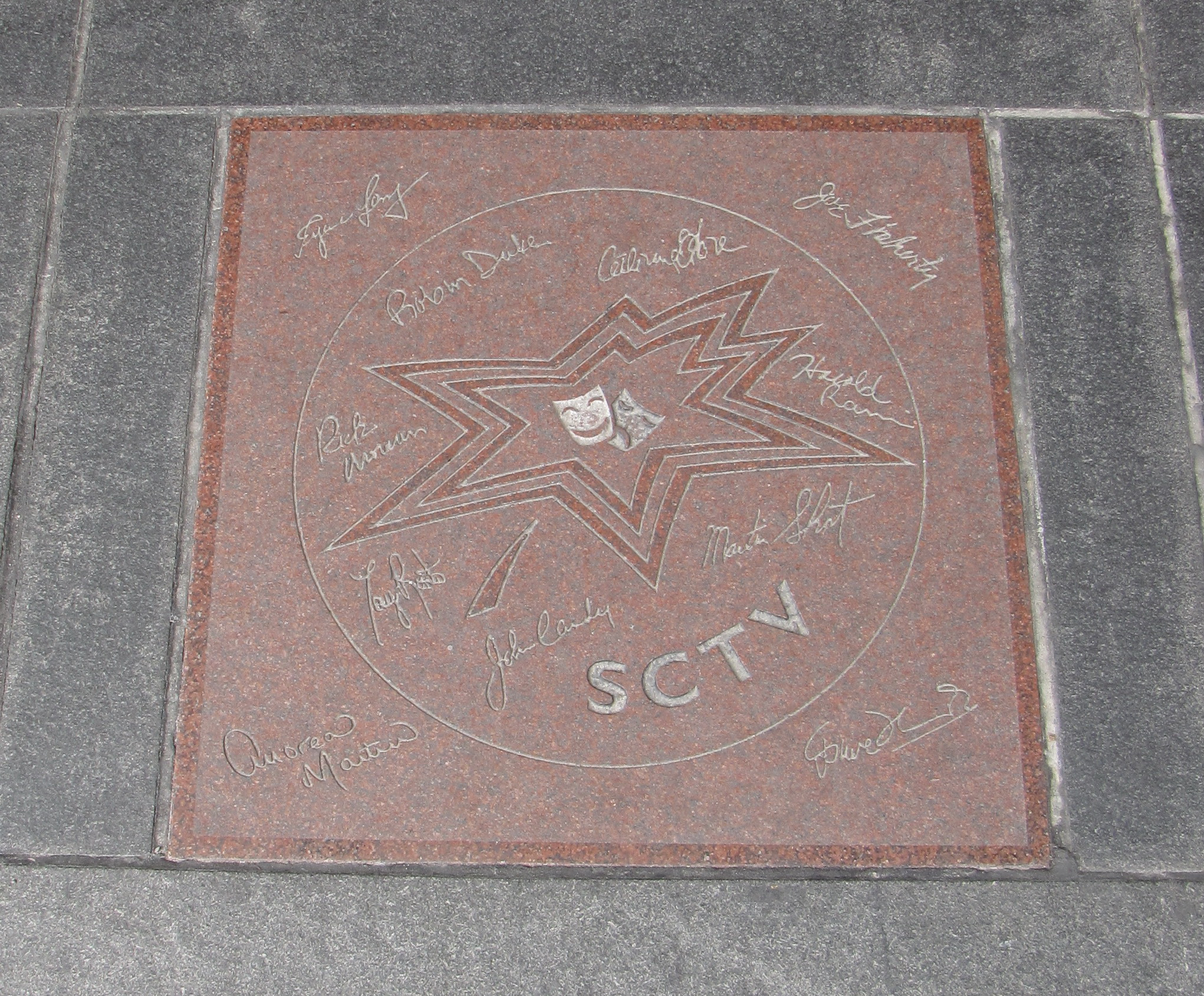
Star on Canada's Walk of Fame for SCTV in Toronto. Signatures in inner circle, clockwise from top left: Robin Duke, Catherine O'Hara, Harold Ramis, Martin Short, John Candy, Tony Rosato, and Rick Moranis. In the corners, from top left: Eugene Levy, Joe Flaherty, Dave Thomas, and Andrea Martin

During its network run on NBC, the show garnered 15 Emmy nominations (often with multiple episodes competing against each other).

In 1982, the episode "Moral Majority" won an Emmy Award for Writing for a Variety or Music Program. During Joe Flaherty's acceptance speech, award presenter Milton Berle repeatedly interrupted with sarcastic retorts of "That's funny". Flaherty then turned to Berle and said, "Sorry, Uncle Miltie...go to sleep" (a parody of Berle's famous closing line to children at the end of his Texaco Star Theater programs, "Listen to your Uncle Miltie and go to bed"). A flustered Berle simply replied, "What?" The incident became comedy fodder for SCTV, as the next season contained a bit where Flaherty beats up a Berle lookalike while shouting, "You'll never ruin another acceptance speech, Uncle Miltie!"

In 1983, the episode "Sweeps Week" won the award again.

In 2002, SCTV was inducted into Canada's Walk of Fame.

== Features ==
SCTV parody shows include a parody of the Western drama The Life and Times of Grizzly Adams, retitled Grizzly Abrams, which depicts Adams as the owner of a wild tortoise that takes weeks to lead police to the skeletal remains of its master, trapped beneath a fallen log.

Battle of the PBS Stars is a parody of ABC television's Battle of the Network Stars athletic competitions that pitted performers against each other in running and swimming events. SCTV's version features a team of public television stars captained by William F. Buckley Jr. (played by Flaherty) vs. a team led by Carl Sagan (played by Thomas), with confrontations that include Fred Rogers of Mister Rogers' Neighborhood fame (played by Short) in a boxing match with chef Julia Child (played by Candy).

The People's Global Golden Choice Awards sends up award shows in which the industry honours itself. Presenters include Elizabeth Taylor (played by O'Hara) and Jack Klugman (Flaherty) reading off the nominees in each category, with SCTV chief Guy Caballero secretly having conspired to guarantee that every award goes to his own network's stars.

SCTV's sketches also involve parodies of low-budget late-night advertisements, such as "Al Peck's Used Fruit" (enticing viewers to visit by offering free tickets to Circus Lupus, the Circus of the Wolves; mocked-up photos depict wolves forming a pyramid and jumping through flaming hoops). They also created faux-inept ads for local businesses such as "Phil's Nails", "Chet Vet the Dead Pet Remover", and "Tex and Edna Boil's Prairie Warehouse and Curio Emporium."

The laugh track used in early episodes was recorded using audience reactions during live performances in the Second City theatre.

=== Sketches and characters ===
Popular sketches and recurring characters include:

- Mailbag, SCTV's take on a vox populi segment where near-apoplectic host Bill Needle (Thomas) answers viewer mail. The show's length is continually cut until Needle is down to mere seconds of airtime. Needle appears frequently in SCTV shows that were canceled after one episode.
- Farm Film Report or Farm Film Celebrity Blow-Up: Two yokels, Big Jim McBob (Flaherty) and Billy Sol Hurok (Candy), interview celebrities and ultimately encourage them to explode (creating the catchphrase "blowed up good, blowed up real good!"). Exploding guests include Dustin Hoffman, David Steinberg (both played by Short), Bernadette Peters (Martin), Meryl Streep, Brooke Shields (both played by O'Hara), and a lispy Neil Sedaka (Levy).
- Polynesiantown is a parody of modern-day film noir. In its attempt to emulate the movie Chinatown, this extended one-shot sketch ends with a crane shot that pushes the show so over budget that the sketch's producers get in trouble with the network. The show's writers incorporate this behind-the-scenes drama into the show's long-term continuity, sending the career of actor/producer/superstar Johnny LaRue (Candy) into a tailspin as a result of this budget mishap.
- The Sammy Maudlin Show: Flaherty is the Afro-coiffed, knee-slapping, overly effusive host welcoming a panel of "stars" who do nothing but heap lavish praise on each other and applaud their pointless profundities. The sketch originated as a parody of Sammy Davis Jr.'s short-lived talk show Sammy and Company. John Candy played the Ed McMahon-style sidekick/sycophant William B. Williams, named for the actual sidekick on Sammy and Company, radio personality William B. Williams. Eugene Levy portrayed egomaniacal funnyman Bobby Bittman, with his repeated catchphrase "How are ya?". Bittman's younger brother, Skip Bittman, played by Moranis, also eventually appeared on Maudlin. Andrea Martin parodied Liza Minnelli and Lorna Luft with "real terrific" combo-character Lorna Minnelli; Catherine O'Hara also portrayed a character that combined two personalities, Lola Heatherton, based on Joey Heatherton and Lola Falana.
- The Days of the Week is a soap-opera spoof, with the continuing saga of terminally ill rock star Clay Collins (Moranis) trying to marry slutty fiancée Sue Ellen Alison (O'Hara) in the few days left to him by his tactless doctor Elliot Sabian (Levy). A second plot hatched by corrupt doctor Wainwright (Candy) has small-time criminal Rocco (Flaherty) conning the wealthy Violet McKay (O'Hara) into accepting him as her long-lost son Billy, though Rocco is so inept that he mistakes Mojo the maid (Martin) for his mother. A third story has the suave swindler Harrington (Thomas) trying to seduce the suicidally depressed May Matlock (Martin) out of the land she owns. It is the only recurring segment throughout the series without a laugh track. The title is a parody of the title of one of the most famous soap operas, Days of Our Lives.
- Mel's Rock Pile is a knockoff of the Citytv dance show Boogie and closely resembles American Bandstand and Don Kirshner's Rock Concert. It is hosted by "Rockin' Mel" Slirrup (Levy), a nervous, bespectacled nerd who plays lame pop songs for surly in-studio teen guests. One memorable episode of Mel's Rock Pile features an appearance by Sex Pistols-type band The Queen Haters, featuring the entire Short-era cast in perfect '80s punk-band mode. Another features Thomas as Richard Harris, performing "MacArthur Park" live in the studio, complete with lengthy instrumental breaks. As Harris dances jerkily behind the microphone and his backing vocalist sits reading a book, Mel awkwardly tries to fill the otherwise-idle time in various ways such as talking with spectators and sending the show to a commercial. Once the song finally ends, a spectator throws a brick at Harris and hits him in the chest.
- Martin Short's Jackie Rogers Jr. is an earnestly smarmy albino Las Vegas headliner with a grating, lisping laugh in a manner similar to Sammy Davis Jr. Rogers is partial to sequinned jumpsuits, Jack Jones-style song standards, and "eligible ladies". Later, Rogers runs for political office but drops out of the race when he realizes it is cramping his showbiz lifestyle. His father, Jackie Rogers Sr., (also played by Short) was a vaudeville star who fell on hard times after a child welfare officer took away the children he used in his act (including his own son). After his agent finds him boxing and urges him to get back into singing, Rogers Sr. sets up a comeback special called Jackie Rogers Sr.: Swinging with Nature. Unfortunately, Rogers Sr. died when a cougar attacked him during one of his musical numbers. Jackie Rogers Jr., like Ed Grimley, was later seen on Saturday Night Live when Short was hired there as a cast member.
- Short's somewhat unclassifiable uber-nerd Ed Grimley (later featured on Saturday Night Live when Short became a regular) is an SCTV fixture, appearing on numerous assorted shows, commercials, promos, and "behind-the-scenes" dramas. His hair is styled using an upside-down funnel, and he plays the triangle, for which he took lessons. Grimley has an obsession with the game show Wheel of Fortune and host Pat Sajak. The SNL version of the character is the same, except the sketches have Grimley getting involved in weird situations: meeting a perpetually unlucky man (played by Ringo Starr), being targeted by the Devil (played by Jon Lovitz), and having a near-death experience where his guardian angel (played by special guest host Chevy Chase) will not let him go to Heaven because he needs to get a life. As of 2012, Grimley is the only SNL and SCTV character to have his own children's cartoon show: The Completely Mental Misadventures of Ed Grimley from 1988 (Count Floyd also had a regular segment in this series).
- Half-Wits and High-Q are parodies of quiz shows College Bowl and Reach for the Top hosted by a highly irritable Alex Trebek approximation named Alex Trebel (Levy). Over a decade later, Levy gave Norm Macdonald permission to borrow the basic premise for the Celebrity Jeopardy! sketches on Saturday Night Live; Will Ferrell likewise played an irritable, exasperated Trebek.
- The 5 Neat Guys, an absurdly clean-cut, '50s-style vocal group (à la The Four Freshmen), are portrayed by Candy, Flaherty (as the drunk one), Levy, Moranis, and Thomas. The "5" sing "I've Got a Hickey on My Shoulder", "Pimples and Pockmarks", and other unmemorable tunes. Several of their songs contrast with their squeaky-clean image, such as "She Does It", "Nancy Has the Largest Breasts in Town", and "Who Made the Egg Salad Sandwiches?"
- Connie Franklin is a caricature of Connie Francis portrayed by Andrea Martin. Franklin appears on the Sammy Maudlin Show and also in a parody of mail-order record commercials. Her songs are universally depressing; one contains the lyrics, "I'm losing my hearing, I've lost sight in one eye. I'm sorry, I can't hear you, did you really say goodbye?"
- Another Martin Short character, talk-show host Brock Linehan, is a parody of real-life Canadian interviewer Brian Linehan. Linehan was famous for his meticulous interview preparation, often uncovering details that even his interview guests had forgotten, which Short satirizes by going in the opposite direction. On SCTV's version of the Linehan show, called Stars in One, all the research compiled about any particular episode's guest is wrong, making for unhappy guests and a frustrated, uneasy host.
- Harry, the Guy with the Snake on his Face (Candy), runs Melonville's adult book and X-rated video stores.
- "Video deejay" Gerry Todd (Moranis) hosts an all-night "televised-radio" type of video show. Moranis's turtleneck-sporting, smooth-talking, radio-personality parody, complete with casually pronounced "vuddeeo", presages the first group of MTV VJs.
- Mayor Tommy Shanks (Candy) is Melonville's "easygoing" (i.e., corrupt) mayor, a man prone to sudden fits of rage and physical violence who still gives regular fireside chats on SCTV, while feeding treats to a stuffed dog that sits motionless by his side. Throwing out one non sequitur after another, Shanks conveys nothing of relevance during his broadcasts. Eventually, he succumbs to mental illness and is institutionalized. While still in the institution, he runs for reelection with the campaign slogan "Get me outta here!" and wins by a landslide. Some sources erroneously claim the character is named after Edmonton jazz musician (and future senator) Tommy Banks, but the character antedates SCTV's move to Edmonton by two years (first being referenced in the Toronto-shot episode 2.8 "The Mirthmakers/Happy Endings", aired 4 November 1978) and does not resemble Banks.
- SCTV News (later Nightline Melonville), anchored by Flaherty as mostly professional (but alcoholic) newscaster Floyd Robertson and Levy as Earl Camembert, a model of oblivious self-importance. The members of the SCTV news team are named after Canadian news anchors Lloyd Robertson and Earl Cameron, but bear no resemblance to them (Camembert was in fact based on American newsman Irv Weinstein, and Robertson on American newsman Bill Burns). Unlike the Saturday Night Live news parody Weekend Update, which typically uses actual news headlines as setups for more satirical humour, SCTV News uses more absurdist humour, with news stories often focusing on events in Melonville. Another source of humour for this segment is the contrast between the hapless Camembert (whose name is inexplicably pronounced "Canenbare") and the more respected Robertson, who usually ends up playing straight man to Camembert's antics. A running gag involves the news team's tendency to give the hard news items to Robertson (such as the latest earthquake to hit the tiny nation of Togoland) and the trivial or poorly prepared stories to his co-anchor (such as a fire at a doily factory).
- Monster Chiller Horror Theatre: This fright-film showcase is hosted by Flaherty's character Count Floyd, a "vampire" who mysteriously howls like a wolf. Floyd is unable to pick genuinely scary movies, and at times has to introduce movies he has never seen and knows nothing about. The show features laughably non-frightening Z movies like Dr. Tongue's 3-D House of Stewardesses, 3-D House of Beef, and Tip O'Neill's 3-D House of Representatives; 3-D movies are burlesqued. Many of the movie's feature "mad scientist" Dr. Tongue (Candy) and his hunchback assistant, Bruno, played by Woody Tobias Jr. (Levy). As revealed in his first appearance, Count Floyd is actually SCTV News anchorman Floyd Robertson working a second job. This character note was ignored for several years before being picked up again as a plot thread toward the end of the show's run. Floyd's double duty is a comic homage to the early days of television, when kiddie-show hosts at smaller TV stations were often members of the local news staff in costume.
- Mrs. Falbo's Tiny Town is an educational television show parody. Wanda Falbo (Martin) talks to the children's viewers about different things as her visit to Melonville Maximum Security Prison and even introduced the kids to G. Gordon Liddy (Thomas). She is assisted by Mr. Messenger (Candy). Falbo appeared in segments of Sesame Street from 1989 to 2000, where she worked as the Word Fairy.
- The Shmenge Brothers (Candy and Levy) are the leaders of The Happy Wanderers, a polka band from the fictional Eastern European country of Leutonia. Based on Czechoslovak-born, Edmonton-based polka cable show host Gaby Haas, the Shmenges appear in seasons three and four. Like Bob and Doug McKenzie, the Shmenges were breakout characters and their popularity resulted in the HBO special The Last Polka (a parody of Martin Scorsese's The Last Waltz). In one episode, the Shmenges perform a memorable tribute to composer John Williams. The band's name is based on the Friedrich-Wilhelm Möller song "The Happy Wanderer", often performed by polka artists. In each episode, the hosts make a point of thanking the hostesses for the cabbage rolls and coffee provided. Later, Candy played another polka clarinetist in Home Alone, which also starred O'Hara.
- Harvey K-Tel is portrayed by Thomas. K-Tel, a parody of rapid-fire, mail-order commercial announcers, speaks in a rapid patter both on and off the air. The character's name derives from both Canadian mail-order commercial company K-tel and actor Harvey Keitel.
- The famous CCCP1-Russian television episode has SCTV taken over by Soviet programming. At first, nothing seems out of the ordinary at the station; on the air, Levy plays Perry Como in a promo for Still Alive, a TV special in which Como's trademark relaxed style is taken to ludicrous extremes as the singer performs most of the disco-inspired set lying down (at one point performing "I Love the Nightlife" curled up in bed). Then, after The Great White North, and during a live broadcast of Caesar featuring Bobby Bittman, SCTV experiences a broadcast signal intrusion as a Soviet propaganda channel's signal overtakes SCTV's. The station calls itself "three-C-P-one", referring to the former Union of Soviet Socialist Republics, which is abbreviated USSR in English but CCCP in Cyrillic. The "shows" are Russian-themed spoofs: Tibor's Tractor, a situation comedy about a talking tractor similar to My Mother the Car but with the voice of Nikita Khrushchev; a game show, What Fits into Russia?, in which the host mocks other countries by comparing them to the USSR's massive size; Upo-Scrabblenyk, a crossword game show where ridiculously long words are considered abbreviations; and Hey, Giorgy, a sitcom about "everybody's favorite Cossack" modeled on the Canadian TV series King of Kensington, with the memorable line "Uzbeks drank my battery fluid!", uttered when Moranis's Lada will not start outside an alehouse. (Popping the hood reveals the old-style battery's six cells sporting bendy straws.) The CCCP1 episode is shot with a "new Soviet mini-cam", a massive electronic device the size of a small car that has to be dragged around by three technicians and burns up early in the show. The piece repeatedly makes clear that CCCP's enemy is the Uzbeks, a reflection of the Soviet Union's ongoing struggle with Uzbek nationalism. At one point, Guy Caballero attempts to get parent network NBC to address the intrusion, only for Fred Silverman to inquire if the Soviet programs are ratings hits.
- A The Jazz Singer parody reverses the story by having musical guest Al Jarreau play a popular jazz singer who wants to become a cantor (hazzan). His father is a disapproving pop-music impresario played by Levy's befuddled Sid Dithers. Dithers, four feet tall and cross-eyed behind Coke-bottle glasses, speaks with a thick early vaudeville-style Yiddish accent ("San Fransishky? So how did you came: did you drove, or did you flew?"). In the payoff moment, Jarreau has become a synagogue cantor, fulfilling his dream against his father's wishes, and wonders whether his father will ever speak to him again, until, during the service, he is interrupted by a disco-clad Dithers standing in the doorway in dancing shoes, spangled jacket, and corn-rowed hair.
- Tex & Edna Boil's Organ Emporium (or "Prairie Warehouse and Curio Emporium") is a series of parodies of local car-dealer TV ads with Tex and Edna (Thomas and Martin) imploring viewers to "Come on down!" to buy their wares.
- Thursday Night Live is a low-budget ripoff of Fridays and Saturday Night Live created by Guy Caballero, who wants to go hip by making this show. It is a long collage of uncontrollable laughter and hooting from the rowdy audience and many unconvincing samplings of profanity and corny drug jokes. The guest host is Earl Camembert, who during the monologue does a bad impression of Steve Martin, saying, "Well, I beg your pardon!"
- Towering Inferno is a satire of the 1974 film, with each cast member playing multiple roles, trying to escape "the world's thinnest, tallest building" after it catches fire. Martin is at this point the only female cast member, so doubles are used when two women appear in the same shot. As Dr. Tongue, Candy says, "You take the Edith Prickley double and I'll take the other girl and get out of here", acknowledging the fake as a wink to the audience. A nuclear reactor is atop the building, with a spinning restaurant above it.
- Doorway to Hell with Lin Ye Tang (Dave Thomas) is a program similar to The Twilight Zone.
- Moranis portrays singer Michael McDonald in a sketch parodying his prevalence as a backing vocalist during the 1970s and 80s. In it, he speeds to a studio set to Christopher Cross's Ride Like the Wind, where he spends the minute-long session between repeatedly singing his six words of the song ("such a long way to go") and arguing about royalties with the producer. After he finishes, the producer tells him he'll probably call him in next week for another recording and McDonald runs back to his car to rush to the next studio.

=== Bob and Doug McKenzie ===
Ironically, the most popular sketch in the program's eight-year history was intended as throw-away filler. Bob and Doug McKenzie, the dim-witted, beer-chugging, and back bacon-eating brothers in a recurring Canadian-themed sketch called Great White North, were initially developed by Rick Moranis and Dave Thomas as a sardonic response to the CBC network's request that the show feature two minutes of "identifiably Canadian content" in every episode. The two-minute length reflects the fact that American shows were two minutes shorter than Canadian ones (to allow more commercials), leaving two minutes needing content for the Canadian market. The Bob and Doug McKenzie segments first appeared in 1980 at the start of season three and continued in every episode until Thomas and Moranis left the series.

The characters ultimately became icons of the very Canadian culture they parodied, spinning off albums, a feature film (Strange Brew), commercials, and numerous TV and film cameos. Bob and Doug helped popularize the stereotypical Canadian trait of adding "eh" to the end of sentences, a facet of Canadian life often gently ridiculed in American shows featuring Canadian characters. Lines from the sketch, such as "Take off, you hoser!", became part of North American popular culture. Thomas later revealed in his 1996 book SCTV: Behind the Scenes that the other members of the cast grew envious and bitter at the immense financial and popular success of the Bob and Doug McKenzie albums, ultimately leading to Thomas and Moranis leaving the show in 1982. Flaherty and Candy accused Thomas of using his position as head writer to increase the visibility of Bob and Doug, though the original segments were largely unscripted. An SCTV episode even poked fun at the duo's popularity. Guy Caballero declared that they had become SCTV's top celebrities, supplanting Johnny LaRue. This led to the pair being given a Bob and Doug "special" with Tony Bennett as their guest, which wound up being a disaster.

Moranis and Thomas recreated Bob and Doug in the form of a pair of moose in the animated feature Brother Bear from Disney. During Canadian rock band Rush's 2007 Snakes And Arrows tour, Moranis and Thomas reprised their Bob and Doug Mackenzie roles in an introductory clip projected on the rear screen for the song "The Larger Bowl". Previously, Rush used Flaherty as Count Floyd to introduce their song "The Weapon" during their 1984 Grace Under Pressure Tour. Rush vocalist Geddy Lee sang the chorus on the hit single "Take Off" from the 1982 Mercury Records album The Great White North by Bob and Doug McKenzie. On March 27, 1982, "Take Off" reached number 16 on the Billboard Hot 100. It is the highest-charting single of Lee's career; Lee was an elementary-school classmate of Moranis as a child.

=== Special guests and musical guests ===
Sir John Gielgud and Sir Ralph Richardson were the show's first guest stars.

The show's NBC years brought with them a network edict to include musical guests (in part because of their use on Saturday Night Live, which NBC executives considered the model for SCTV, despite their being very different shows). At first, the SCTV cast, writers, and producers resisted special guests, on the theory that famous people wouldn't just "drop into" the Melonville studios, but they soon discovered that by working these guests into different shows-within-shows they could keep the premise going while also giving guest stars something more to do than show up and sing a song.

As a result, Dr. John became a featured player in the movie "Polynesiantown", John Mellencamp (at the time, known as John Cougar) was Mister Hyde to Ed Grimley's Doctor Jekyll in "The Nutty Lab Assistant", Natalie Cole was transformed into a zombie by a glowing cabbage in "Zontar", and the Boomtown Rats were both blown up on "Farm Film Celebrity Blow Up" and starred in the To Sir, with Love parody "Teacher's Pet". James Ingram appeared on 3-D House of Beef, and violinist Eugene Fodor in New York Rhapsody. Hall & Oates appeared on a "Sammy Maudlin Show" segment promoting a new film called Chariots of Eggs, a parody of both Chariots of Fire and Personal Best, and showed scenes from the faux movie as clips. Canadian singer-songwriter Ian Thomas (the real-life brother of cast member Dave Thomas) was the "topic" on a Great White North sketch. Carl Perkins, Jimmy Buffett, Joe Walsh, The Tubes, and Plasmatics also appeared on the "Fishin' Musician", hosted by Gil Fisher (Candy).

This, along with SCTV's cult status, led to the show's celebrity fans clamouring to appear. Tony Bennett credited his appearance on Bob and Doug McKenzie's variety-show debacle "The Great White North Palace" for triggering a significant career comeback. Carol Burnett did an ad for the show in which an alarm clock goes off next to her bed, she rises up suddenly and advises those who couldn't stay up late enough (the NBC version aired from 12:30 to 2 a.m.) to go to bed, get some sleep, then wake up to watch the show. Burnett later briefly appeared in a climactic courtroom episode of "The Days of the Week".

Former Chicago Second City player, Saturday Night Live cast member, and film actor Bill Murray also guest-starred on a "Days of the Week" installment as a photography buff scrambling to make it to the wedding of singer-songwriter Clay Collins (Rick Moranis) and town slut Sue-Ellen Allison (Catherine O'Hara) in time to take pictures of the event. In the same episode, he played two other roles: Johnny LaRue's biggest fan, who is subsequently hired to be LaRue's bodyguard (and who pushes his homemade LaRue T-shirts whenever possible), and Joe DiMaggio in a commercial for DiMaggio's restaurant, where he offered a free meal to anyone who could strike him out. (The strikeout challenges then took place in the middle of the dining room, with many patrons injured by speeding baseballs.)

Robin Williams guest-starred in a sketch called Bowery Boys in the Band in which his Leo Gorcey-like character tries to hide a gay lifestyle from his Huntz Hall-inspired pal (played by Short). Williams also mimicked actor John Houseman eloquently reading the Melonville telephone book.

In a rare acting role, singer Crystal Gayle guest-starred in a January 1983 episode in the sketch "A Star is Born", a spoof of the 1976 film version of the movie, playing an up-and-coming singer trying to make it big under the tutelage of her boyfriend and mentor Kris Kristofferson (played by Flaherty).

Canadian actors, including Jayne Eastwood, Dara Forward, Monica Parker, and Peter Wildman, appeared on the show occasionally as guests. Catherine O'Hara's sister, singer-songwriter Mary Margaret O'Hara, also appeared in a bit part in the episode "Broads Behind Bars". William B. Davis, still a decade away from his signature role as The X-Files' "Smoking Man", also has a bit role in one 1983 episode.

== Syndication and music rights ==
SCTV had a 90-minute format, unique for a dramatic or comedy series, but more common on talk shows. Such shows are typically hard to fit into an ordinary commercial television schedule, and the market was limited. The original 90-minute shows were never rebroadcast in their entirety.

Instead, in 1984, after production on the series ended, the Second City Television syndicated half-hour episodes and SCTV Network 90-minute episodes were reedited into half-hour shows by Blair Entertainment (formerly Rhodes Productions, which distributed SCTV in the U.S. during its original run) for a revised syndicated package, which consisted of 156 reedited half-hours. In 1990, a separate package of 26 half-hours (edited from the pay-TV SCTV Channel episodes) aired on The Comedy Channel (and later Comedy Central) in the United States. Like the original syndicated series, the American and Canadian versions of the 1984 package differed, with the Canadian half-hours a couple of minutes longer; the running order of episodes also differed between the two countries. By the late 1990s, the reedited SCTV Channel episodes were added to the regular SCTV syndicated package; three additional half-hours (all from the 1980–1981 season) were restored to the package, knocking the episode count up to 185 half-hours. By this time, distribution rights had passed to WIC Entertainment, which bought Allarcom in the late 1980s (WIC also distributed SCTV in the U.S. after Blair Entertainment shut down in 1992); distribution subsequently passed to Fireworks Entertainment after its then-parent company, CanWest, purchased WIC's television stations and production/distribution assets in 1999.

In the mid-to-late 1990s, the syndication package was aired in the U.S. on Trio, a cable and satellite channel co-owned by the CBC at the time.

The syndication package was picked up by NBC following the cancellation of its late-night talk show Later on January 18, 2001, but to retain continuity with the latter, it was aired with an introduction voiced by Friday Night and occasional Later substitute host Rita Sever and was known as Later Presents: SCTV. It aired until Last Call with Carson Daly took over the time slot on January 4, 2002, from Monday to Thursday; Late Friday (which also had a title change the same week SCTV was picked up) aired on Fridays. Once again, as had been the case during the 1981–83 run, SCTV amounted to placeholding schedule filler.

For years, SCTV was unavailable on videotape or DVD (apart from one compilation, The Best of John Candy on SCTV), or in any form except these reedited half-hour programs. Due to difficulty obtaining music rights for DVD releases, Shout! Factory edited music in certain sketches or even left out sketches like "Stairways to Heaven". Dave Thomas acknowledged: "We were true guerrilla TV in that when we wanted background music we just lifted it from wherever we wanted. Consequently, today, to release the shows on home video, it would cost millions to clear the music."

In 2026, SCTV was finally added to Amazon Prime Video in Canada and Netflix in the United States. To prepare for distribution, Second City music coordinator Jesse Case scrubbed much of the copyrighted material in favor of original music (one notable instance replaces a performance by O'Hara as Brooke Shields of the Rod Stewart song "Young Turks" with a generic piece using artificial intelligence to make it appear that Shields is singing nonsensical lyrics). But Case kept works that he felt contributed to the sketch, such as Christopher Cross's "Ride Like the Wind" for the segment where Michael McDonald (Moranis) races into the studio to record his backing vocals, plus performances by musical guests, saying, "There are things that really hinge upon the song that's playing under them". Case worked to obtain the proper licenses for that material.

== Home media ==
Sony Music Entertainment has released some of SCTV on DVD in Region 1. All episodes from Season 4 and 5 (which aired on NBC) have been released in 4 volumes, and a "best-of" DVD features episodes from Seasons 2 and 3.

DVD name	# of Ep	Release date
SCTV – Vol. 1: Network 90	9	June 8, 2004
SCTV – Vol. 2	9	October 19, 2004
SCTV – Vol. 3	9	March 1, 2005
SCTV – Vol. 4	12	September 13, 2005

Other releases

- Christmas with SCTV: Released October 4, 2005 (Two Christmas-themed episodes from 1981 and 1982)
- SCTV – Best of The Early Years: Released October 24, 2006 (15 selected episodes from Seasons 2 and 3)

== Stage reunions ==
On May 5 and 6, 2008 most of the cast reunited for a charity event, 'The Benefit of Laughter', at the Second City Theatre in Toronto. Eugene Levy, Martin Short, Andrea Martin, Catherine O'Hara, Robin Duke, and Joe Flaherty took part; Dave Thomas reportedly bowed out due to illness. The event was a fundraiser for The Alumni Fund, which helps support former Second City cast and crew members facing health or financial difficulties. The performances have not been released.

In 2017, several members of the troupe, alongside members of The Kids in the Hall, performed at a benefit show for Spinal Cord Injury Ontario, after Jake Thomas, the son of Dave Thomas's brother Ian, was injured in a snowmobiling accident.

== SCTV Golden Classics 2010 ==
To honor the 50th anniversary of The Second City, SCTV Golden Classics aired nationwide in the United States on public television stations beginning March 2010 featuring some memorable sketches from the comedy television series.

== Film ==
Although SCTV was never directly adapted as a film, the characters of Bob and Doug McKenzie, popularized on the series, were featured in their own film, 1983's Strange Brew. A sequel was planned in the late 1990s but never produced.

== Reunion special ==
In April 2018, Netflix announced that Martin Scorsese would direct an original comedy special exploring the legacy of the show. In May 2018, it was announced the special would be titled An Afternoon with SCTV and air on CTV in Canada and Netflix worldwide. It was released in October 2026.

== Documentary ==
Netflix added SCTV to its streaming service in the U.S. and other non-Canadian markets in September 2026. It also announced a documentary, SCTV: The Greatest Show You've Never Heard Of, directed by Jason Hehir (The Last Dance) for release on the service on October 30, 2026. It is said to feature "intimate interviews with surviving cast members and an emotional reunion in Toronto." Exclaim! incorrectly presumed this to be the same as the 2018 reunion recorded for An Afternoon with SCTV, as moderator Jimmy Kimmel is an executive producer of the documentary.
