= Joe Flaherty =

American actor (1941–2024)

- Born: Joseph O'Flaherty; June 21, 1941; Pittsburgh, Pennsylvania, U.S
- Died: April 1, 2024 (aged 82)
- Occupations: Actor; writer; comedian
- Years active: 1969–2018
- Spouse: Judith Dagley (m. 1974; div. 1996)
- Children: 2

Joseph Flaherty (né O'Flaherty; June 21, 1941 – April 1, 2024) was an American actor, writer, and comedian. In television, Flaherty starred on the Canadian sketch comedy SCTV from 1976 to 1984 (on which he also served as a writer, winning two Primetime Emmy Awards) and as Harold Weir on Freaks and Geeks (1999). His notable film roles include one of the Sleaze Brothers in Follow That Bird (1985), alongside SCTV co-stars John Candy and Dave Thomas, and the heckler in Happy Gilmore (1996).

== Early life and career ==
Joseph O'Flaherty was born on June 21, 1941, in Pittsburgh, Pennsylvania, the eldest of seven children. His father was a production clerk at Westinghouse Electric and of Irish heritage and his mother was of Italian descent.

Flaherty served in the United States Air Force for four years, before becoming involved in dramatic theatre.

Flaherty moved to Chicago, where he started his comedy career in 1969 with the Second City Theater as Joe O'Flaherty and would work with future stars such as John Belushi and Harold Ramis. He dropped the "O" in his birth name as there was another Joseph O'Flaherty registered with Actors Equity. Along with several other Second City performers, he began appearing on the National Lampoon Radio Hour from 1973 to 1974. After seven years in Chicago, he moved to Toronto to help establish the Toronto Second City theatre troupe. During those years, he was one of the original writer/performers on SCTV, where he spent eight years on the show, playing such characters as Big Jim McBob (of Farm Film Report fame), Count Floyd/Floyd Robertson, and station owner/manager Guy Caballero, who goes around in a wheelchair only for respect and undeserved sympathy.

SCTV ceased production in 1984. The same year, Flaherty played Count Floyd in a short film that was shown at concerts by the rock band Rush before the song "The Weapon", for their tour in support of Grace Under Pressure (and can be seen in the home video, Grace Under Pressure Tour).

In 1988, Flaherty reprised his Count Floyd character for live-action segments of the animated series The Completely Mental Misadventures of Ed Grimley, a character created and voiced by another SCTV alum, Martin Short.

Flaherty appeared in a number of cult-favorite films, including an appearance as a Western Union postal worker who delivers Doc Brown's 70-year-old letter to Marty McFly in Back to the Future Part II (1989), as well as the crazed heckler Donald Floyd yelling "Jackass!" who secretly works for antagonist Shooter McGavin in Happy Gilmore (1996). In season eight of Family Guy, Flaherty once again played the Western Union man in "Something, Something, Something, Dark Side".

Flaherty plays a Vatican Messenger in the Family Guy season 9 episode "The Big Bang Theory". In 1989, he played a guest role in Married... with Children in the season-four episode "Tooth or Consequences", as a dentist who must repair Al Bundy's teeth. From 1990 to 1993, Flaherty starred in The Family Channel series, Maniac Mansion.

During 1997–1998, Flaherty starred in the television adaptation of Police Academy (Police Academy: The Series) as Cmdt. Stuart Hefilfinger. The series lasted for only one season. In 1999, Flaherty joined the cast of Freaks and Geeks, an NBC hour-long dramedy set in the 1980–1981 academic year, in which he played Harold Weir, the "imperfect perfect" father of two teens. Despite a dedicated cult following, the show only lasted one season.

Flaherty made appearances on the CBS sitcom The King of Queens as Father McAndrew, the priest at the Heffernans' church. He starred on the Bite TV original program, Uncle Joe's Cartoon Playhouse, and served as a judge on the CBC program The Second City's Next Comedy Legend.

From 2001 to 2004, he had appeared in various Disney shows and films, including The Legend of Tarzan and Home on the Range.

In 2018, Flaherty participated in a SCTV cast reunion at Toronto's Elgin Theatre filmed by Martin Scorsese for a yet to be released Netflix special on SCTV.

Beginning in 2004, Flaherty was artist-in-residence at Humber College's School of Creative and Performing Arts in Toronto, where he taught a comedy writing course. He previously helped found the school's comedy writing and performance program serving as its artistic director. He was also on the program's advisory committee.

== Personal life and death ==
Flaherty was married to Judith Dagley for 22 years until their divorce in 1996. They had two children, Gudrun, who is also an actress and writer, and Gabriel. His brothers, Paul (b. 1945) and Dave (1948–2017), were both comedy writers.

Flaherty died on April 1, 2024, at the age of 82, after a short illness. No cause or place of death were given.

== Characterizations ==
Flaherty impersonated a number of celebrities, including: Kirk Douglas, Richard Nixon, Gregory Peck, Alan Alda, Bing Crosby, Gavin McLeod, William F. Buckley Jr. and Elvis Presley.

Flaherty appeared in a cameo in the deleted scenes from Anchorman as the manager of a Texas television station and the boss of Veronica Corningstone (Christina Applegate), one of the members of the station's news team. He also appeared as an immigration Royal Canadian Mounted Police officer in the "Canadian Road Trip" episode of That '70s Show alongside fellow SCTV member Dave Thomas.

In the third episode of Freaks and Geeks, "Tricks and Treats", he dressed up as a vampire, a reference to his character Count Floyd.

== Discography ==
- Gold Turkey (National Lampoon album, 1975)
- Count Floyd (1982) (RCA)

== Filmography ==
=== Film ===
Year	Title	Role	Notes	References
1976	Tunnel Vision	Carl Michaelevich		
1979	1941	Sal Stewart, Raoul Lipschitz		
1979	The Lady in Red			
1980	Used Cars	Sam Slaton		
1981	By Design	Veteran Father		
1981	Stripes	Border Guard		
1981	Heavy Metal	Lawyer, General (voice)		
1983	Going Berserk	Chick Leff		
1984	Johnny Dangerously	Death Row inmate	Uncredited	
1985	Sesame Street Presents: Follow That Bird	Sid Sleaze		
1986	Club Paradise	Pilot		
1986	One Crazy Summer	General Raymond		
1987	Innerspace	Waiting Room Patient		
1987	Blue Monkey	George Baker		
1988	Kid Safe: The Video	Count Floyd	Video	
1989	Who's Harry Crumb?	Doorman		
1989	Speed Zone	Vic DeRubis	AKA Cannonball Fever	
1989	Back to the Future Part II	Western Union Man		
1994	A Pig's Tale	Milt	Video	
1995	Stuart Saves His Family	Cousin Ray		
1996	Happy Gilmore	Donald Floyd		
1997	Snowboard Academy	Mr. Barry	Video	
1997	The Wrong Guy	Fred Holden		
1999	Detroit Rock City	Father Phillip McNulty		
2001	Freddy Got Fingered	William	Uncredited	
2002	Slackers	Mr. Leonard		
2003	National Security	Owen Fergus		
2004	Home on the Range	Jeb the Goat (voice)		
2004	Anchorman: The Legend of Ron Burgundy	Manager of Texas television station, boss of Veronica Corningstone	Deleted scene	
2004	Phil the Alien	Beaver (voice)		

=== Television ===
Year	Title	Role	Notes	References
1972	The David Steinberg Show	Kirk Dirkwood	10 episodes	
1976	The Sunshine Hour	Various	Regular	
1976–1984	SCTV	Various		
1978	King of Kensington	Fast Frankie	Episode: "The Hustler"	
1985	George Burns Comedy Week	Guest star		
1986	Really Weird Tales	Your Host	TV movie/pilot, also producer and writer	
1988	CBS Summer Playhouse	Regis Rogan	Episode: "Limited Partners"	
1988	The Completely Mental Misadventures of Ed Grimley	Count Floyd	13 episodes	
1989	Looking for Miracles	Chief Berman	TV movie	
1989	I, Martin Short, Goes Hollywood	Gene Siskel	TV movie	
1989	Married... with Children	Dr. Plierson	Episode: "Tooth or Consequences"	
1990	Monsters	Sherwin	Episode: "Murray's Monster"	
1990–1993	Maniac Mansion	Dr. Fred Edison	65 episodes	
1991	Morton & Hayes	Thug	Episode: "The Vase Shop"	
1991	Little Dracula	Big Dracula (voice)	4 episodes	
1993–1994	Dinosaurs	Chief Elder (voice)		
1994	Nurses	Mr. Fortin	Episode: "The Big Jack Attack"	
1994	Phenom	Father O'Malley		
1994	Rebel Highway	Mr. Nicholson	Episode: "Runaway Daughters"	
1994	Hardball	Butt Winnick		
1995	Family Reunion: A Relative Nightmare	Kevin Dooley	TV movie	
1995	Cartoon Planet	Count Floyd		
1996	Dream On	Stod	Episode: "Second Time Aground"	
1996	The Louie Show	Mr. Wells		
1996	Ellen	Perry	Episode: "Kiss My Bum"	
1997	The Don's Analyst	Dr. Lowell Royce	TV movie	
1997–1998	Police Academy: The Series	Cmdt. Stuart Hefilfinger		
1999	Traders	McGraff	Episode: "This World... Then the Fireworks"	
1999	The Wonderful World of Disney		Episode: "Dogmatic"	
1999–2000	Freaks and Geeks	Harold Weir	18 episodes	
2000	Mentors	James Naismith	Episode: "Nothing But Net"	
2001	Even Stevens	Mr. Rupert	Episode: "Almost Perfect"	
2001	The Industry	Don Douglas		
2001	That '70s Show	Bryan	Episode: "Canadian Road Trip"	
2001	Go Fish	Dr. Frank Troutner		
2001	Primetime Glick	Clay Glick	Episode: "Molly Shannon/Nathan Lane"	
2001	The Legend of Tarzan	Hooft (voice)	Episode: "Tarzan and the Mysterious Visitor"	
2001	The Santa Claus Brothers	Snorkel (voice)	TV movie	
2001–2003	The King of Queens	Father McAndrew	4 episodes	
2002	Maybe It's Me	Chaz	Episode: "The Romeo & Juliet Episode"	
2002	Royal Canadian Air Farce			
2002	Frasier	Herm Evans	Episode: "Frasier Has Spokane"	
2002	A Nero Wolfe Mystery	Dr. Vollmer	2 episodes	
2002–2004	Teamo Supremo	Cloaked Skull (voice)		
2002	The True Meaning of Christmas Specials	Bing Crosby	TV movie	
2002–2003	Clone High	Abe's Foster Dad (voice)	2 episodes	
2004	Puppets Who Kill	Joe	Episode: "Bill's Got the Blues"	
2005	Tilt	Casino Player from Aliquippa	Episode: "Risk Tolerance"	
2005	Chilly Beach	Antoine DelVecchio	Episode: "Driving Mr. Biggs"	
2005	Robson Arms	Ramon Garcia		
2008–2010	Caution: May Contain Nuts	Count Floyd		
2008–2011	Family Guy	Vatican Messenger		
2009	American Dad!	Car Door Owner (voice)	Episode: "Delorean Story-An"	
2012	I, Martin Short, Goes Home	Atticus Finch	TV movie	
2012	Call Me Fitz	Mayor Andrews	Episode: "Teetotal Recall"	
