= List of Super Dave episodes =

The following is a list of Super Dave Osborne Show episodes. The Super Dave Osborne Show, also known as Super Dave, was Canadian/American sketch comedy variety show starring Bob Einstein as fictional stuntman Super Dave Osborne. It ran for five seasons for 97 episodes on Showtime in the US and the Global Television Network in Canada from 1987 to 1991, with each episode approximately 25 minutes long. Reruns started airing on Comedy Gold on September 6, 2011.

== Episodes overview ==
The show would be introduced by well known TV and radio sports announcer Mike Walden using the lighted billboard sign, showing the guest stars and Super Dave's assistants (Fuji Hakayito and/or Donald Glanz) who would be appearing on the show. Typically, after a scene with Super Dave elsewhere in the compound followed by live performances in the studio, an audience member would be asked to turn the show over to Mike, who sported a different outfit every episode. Super Dave, usually arriving on the compound in a special vehicle, would then either prepare to perform a stunt or give a tour of a new area in the compound. The show would end with the stunt often going horribly wrong or a terrible accident happening to him during the tour, leaving the Super One gravely injured (with Mike sometimes asking him if he was all right), giving a farewell speech to the audience.

Season	Episodes	Originally released	
Season	Episodes	First released	Last released
1	13	1987	1987
2	21	1988	1988
3	25	November 4, 1989	1989
4	25	1990	1990
5	13	1991	1991

== Season 1 (1987) ==
The first season of the Super Dave Osborne show was filmed at Glen Warren Studios, in Toronto, Ontario, Canada, the same studio where episodes of Bizarre were taped.

No. overall	No. in season	Title	Billboard Guest Stars	Arrival vehicle	Mike Walden's outfit	Original release date
1	1	"Ultimate Slam Dunk"	Ray Charles	A white four door.	Beige and dark purple plaid jacket, white shirt, red tie and hanky, black pants (Later bright yellow), black shoes.	October 12, 1988
Super Dave is late for his new show, but his car arrives performing handbrake turns. Super attempts to open his show with a question period. Ray Charles sings "They Can't Take That Away from Me". At the Super Dave Memorial Sports Arena, the Super Dave Slam Dunkers perform acrobatic slam dunks. Fuji helps Super Dave perform the "Ultimate Slam Dunk" using a hydraulic catapult that will raise him upright and shoot him into the air where he will catch the ball and slam dunk it. The Super One gets hurt: "All right, we're stopping... no we're not." Instead of raising him upright, the catapult smashes him into the glass basketball backboard. Later, while inspecting the controls, the entire hoop rig falls on him. Super Dave! Super Dave! Are you all right?: "I'm bleeding internally, Mike, but I think I'll have a little gauze for dinner and then I'll be fine." The Last Word: He thanks the Super Dave slam dunkers, Ray Charles, and Carol Burnett. "I'd like to tug my ear and say a special goodnight to you, but I can't move my arms." Special Guest Star: Carol Burnett, who heckles Super Dave at the start of the show.
2	2	"Lip Synching Concert Area"	Fuji Hakayito, Jenny Jones	The Super Dave red motorbike and sidecar.	Bright yellow jacket, white shirt, red tie and hanky, red, yellow, and black plaid pants, white shoes.	Unknown
Super Dave interviews a woman in the audience who dubiously claims to have had Elvis Presley's baby, and a woman who claims to be carrying Warren Beatty's child. Jenny Jones performs standup comedy. Super Dave originally plans to play "Vehicle Tag" with Fuji, but instead shows off the new Outdoor Lip-Synching Concert Area, where he plays the piano and lip-synchs to "The Name Game" by Shirley Ellis. The Super One gets hurt: Fuji, mistakenly thinking they are still going to play "Vehicle Tag" runs over him with a monster truck during his encore performance. Super Dave! Super Dave! Are you all right?: "Yeah, putz, I'm perfect. My intestines look like your pants. I just wish I had my hands back so I could give you the finger." The Last Word: "Remember, kids, don't try this stunt at home. On second thought, don't watch this show at home."
3	3	"Vehicle Safety Centre - Buckle Up"	Robert Gruenberg, Kathy Walker, Bill Roberts	The Super Dave red hovercraft.	Yellow and purple plaid jacket, red tie and hanky, white shirt, black pants. Later: Bright yellow jacket, red tie with diagonal white stripes, red hanky, white shirt, black pants.	Unknown
At the Super Dave Confidence Training Area, Super Dave, accompanied by Donald, receives the "Man of the Year" award from the Academy of Human Performance. Robert Gruenberg juggles a chainsaw, an egg, and an apple. Kathy Walker and Bill Roberts do impersonations of Joan Rivers and Sonny Bono, rounding it off doing Sonny and Cher singing "I Got You Babe". At the Super Dave Vehicle Safety Centre, Super Dave acts as a crash test dummy and drives into a wall to demonstrate the dangers of not buckling up. The Super One gets hurt: "All right, I'm speeding up, and I can see the wall, and I'm dead." After crashing the car, getting out, and giving some additional tips, Super Dave states he doesn't have the energy to return to the car. Mike, trying to help, suggests the car be brought to him, which ends up running him down. Super Dave! Super Dave! Are you all right?: "You know, Mike, I don't know if I ever told you this before, but glass is good roughage. Yeah, Butt-breath, I'm perfect." The Last Word: A seatbelt safety poem: "Roses are red, Mike you're a putz, if I hadn't been wearing my seatbelt, I could have squashed my knees." ("I would have said nuts, but my knees are where my nuts used to be.")
4	4	"Super Ride Straight to Hell"	John Hemphill, Cynthia Belliveau, Smothers Brothers	The Super Dave rocket dirt bike.	Sky blue jacket, red and white striped tie, white shirt, red hanky, black pants, black shoes.	Unknown
Super Dave attempts to do a comedy sketch with Cynthia Belliveau and John Hemphill entitled "Plastic Surgery to Celebrity's Pets" in which Super plays the Doctor. The Smothers Brothers Tom and Dick sing a lively Spanish tune, but Tom screws it up (accidentally?) by singing in German and Dick begins his insult rampage, which results in Super lecturing the Brothers about cussing on television. At the Heavy Metal Motorcycle Preparation Area, Super Dave attempts the "Super Ride Straight to Hell" in which he will jump a three inch wide ramp and land on another three inch wide ramp across the field. The Super One gets hurt: "Here we go, going down and heading for the track. Rockets kick in... and I missed it." He crashes into a shed. The Last Word: A poem for all his horse loving friends: "Roses are red, Violets are blue, The next time you see Thunderclap, He'll probably be glue." ("Just kidding. Don't write me, I love animals. I hired Mike, didn't I?") Special Guest Star: John Davidson sings "Let Your Love Flow" right before Super Dave's stunt, while Super Dave unsuccessfully tries to remain seated on a wild horse in the background.
5	5	"Poundacise"	Donald Glanz, wrestler The Canadian Giant Garry Robbins, Ronn Lucas	-	Bright red jacket, red, grey, black and white striped tie, white hanky, white shirt, black pants, black shoes.	Unknown
Bernie Rothman from the International Television Video Association presents Super and Donald with a triple platinum award for his exercise tape. Super Dave gets the stuffing beat out of him by wrestler the Canadian Giant in his new "Poundacise" video. Super Dave attempts to boost ratings by having scantily clad women on the show. Ventriloquist Ronn Lucas performs a routine with Buffalo Billy the Cowboy and they finish by singing "Row, Row, Row Your Boat". Super Dave closes the show by lip synching "La Bamba". The Super One (doesn't) get hurt: In this rare episode, Super Dave does not get injured at the end of the show. Also, when he receives the aforementioned award, he does not toss it away like he usually does. The Last Word: An apology for not being prepared for improvisation.
6	6	"Vehicle Safety Centre - Bump and Rob"	Fuji Hakayito, Taylor Ripley	The Super Dave red motorbike and sidecar.	Bright yellow jacket, red tie with grey stripes, red hanky, sky blue shirt, black pants, black shoes.	Unknown
A press conference at the Municipal Court House reveals that Super Dave is bringing Time magazine to court for accusing him of being a frivolous spender. A news report comes on regarding the death of a famous Elvis Impersonator, and many fellow impersonators come to pay their last respects. Comedian Rip Taylor performs prop comedy and does a tribute to Super Dave. At the Super Dave Vehicle Safety Centre, Super, with help from Fuji, attempts to explain to the public how to avoid becoming a victim of a "Bump and Rob". The Super One gets hurt: "All right, I'm looking in the mirror, and I can judge Fuji's about 30 yards behind me. I check again, he's about 10 yards. I check again, and my life is over." Instead of just bumping Super's Car, Fuji flattens him into a wall with a cement truck. While Super is incapacitated, Fuji grabs his wallet and takes Mike out to dinner. The Last Word: "Be sure you tune in next week because we're going to show you some never before seen Super Dave home movies. They're my X-rays."
7	7	"Animal Training Centre"	Simba the Elephant, Morty Pillman	-	Sky blue jacket, red tie with white and black stripes, red hanky, light blue shirt, black pants, black shoes.	Unknown
Super Dave gets an audience volunteer to demonstrate a new television camera, which turns out to be a camera that's worn on the volunteer's butt. Pandemonium ensues when Super uses the camera to field questions from the audience. Liberty Silver sings "I Do Love You". At the Super Dave Animal Training Centre, Super shows off his favourite elephant Simba and several trick performing dogs, including Scepter the attack dog. Comedian Morty Pillman does standup comedy, but when he is about to rip off Gallagher and do food smashing, Super steps in and stops him. The Super One gets hurt: He gets fiercely attacked by Scepter, but miraculously manages to come back to the studio to close the show. The Last Word: Super's apology to the audience for Morty's attempted imitation. Special Guest Star: The real Gallagher, who rounds off the show with his signature food smashing act.
8	8	"Happy Birthday, Super Dave"	Donald Glanz, The Nylons, Robert Gruenberg	-	Purple and yellow plaid jacket, red tie and hanky, white shirt. Later: Sky blue jacket, red tie with white and black stripes, red hanky, white shirt, black pants, black shoes.	Unknown
At the Super Dave Confidence Training Area, Robert Gruenberg juggles three machetes. The Nylons sing "Kiss Him Goodbye". Comedian Stan Marvin performs a monologue in which he tells tall tales while onscreen subtitles roughly denounce him. It's Super Dave's birthday! He and Mike treat the audience to the tape of his famous "CN Tower jump" from BIZARRE. Several of Super's friends from previous episodes all wish him a happy birthday, then the cake is brought out while Super is treated to his favourite song, "Twist and Shout". The Super One (doesn't) get hurt: He just gets hurt in the flashback. The Last Word: Super pretending he was surprised by this party. Special Guest Stars: The Smothers Brothers, Steve Allen, Rip Taylor, John Davidson, Carol Burnett, Ronn Lucas (with Buffalo Billy), Gallagher, and Ray Charles, who all wish Super a happy birthday.
9	9	"Prayer Tower"	Donald Glanz, Steve Allen	The Super Dave Swamp Vehicle, with tank treads.	Red jacket, red, grey, white and black striped tie, white hanky, white shirt, white pants, black shoes.	Unknown
Super opens the show by thanking his fans for their support and shows the video from BIZARRE of him lip-synching "9 to 5" by Dolly Parton. Steve Allen wants to play the piano, but Super Dave pressures him to play "Soap Opera Mad Libs" instead with the audience. In the Super Dave Compound's vast marshland, Super Dave and Donald show off their giant Pan-Lux board which was built despite protests that it would never stay up in the swamp. Donald also shows his plans for the Super Dave Prayer Tower. The Super One gets hurt: "I see a 700 foot Pan-Lux board that someday is gonna bring me great pleasure. Unfortunately, it's not today." Turns out the Pan-Lux board can't stand up in the swamp after all, and it falls on him. The Last Word: He promises the audience they'll still hear Steve play, but they run out of time right as they cut back to the studio.
10	10	"Tri-athalon"	KD Lang, The Nylons, Fuji Hakayito	On waterskis behind the Super Dave Boat, making a rather undignified landing.	Red jacket, red, grey, white and black striped tie, white hanky, white shirt, black pants, black shoes.	Unknown
Mike Walden announces that Super Dave is going to attempt to break the triathlon record! Matt Fundal from the "Super Dave Hula Hoop School" performs hoop tricks. Super begins the course by swimming, while Fuji Hakayito follows in his boat with a harpoon in case of shark attack. K.D. Lang sings "Tune Into My Wave". Super, despite being injured, moves on to cycling. The Nylons sing "The Lion Sleeps Tonight". Super then attempts the running part of the triathlon and goes on to break the record! The Super One gets hurt: During the swimming, he does indeed get attacked by a shark, and Fuji accidentally shoots him multiple times. While he is cycling, he gets knocked down by a van. After the running, he is exhausted and needs an ambulance. The ambulance arrives, running Super Dave over and dragging him away a good distance. The Last Word: "If you feel like it, you could applaud for another few seconds, cause i'm going to be in this bowing position for at least a mile and a half."
11	11	"Test Site"	Ronnie Hawkins, General Earl Pennington	Super Dave's "Bullet Proof Painted" car.	Yellow and purple plaid jacket, white shirt, red tie and hanky, navy blue pants, black shoes.	Unknown
Super plays "Meet the Audience" where he talks to audience members and asks what they do, including a humorous pair who play armpit music, and an unlikely looking woman who just became a mother. Ronnie Hawkins, the head of the "Super Dave Rock and Roll School", sings "Mary Lou" by Bob Seger. At the Super Dave Test Site, General Earl Pennington from the US Armed Forces helps Super Dave demonstrate his new invention, "Bullet Proof Paint" by having his men shoot at Super while he is in a car. The Super One gets hurt: Mike, impressed by the demonstration, asks the general to up the ante by getting his men to use heavy artillery on the car. The bazooka finishes him off. Super Dave! Super Dave! Are you all right?: "I'm too upset to even swear." The Last Word: "I would like to squeeze his fat face until his butt turned the colour of his coat. Here I am, a human marshmallow, left alone to drive myself to the hospital. The star of my own show. Great, now the battery's dead. What difference does it make? I'm dead too."
12	12	"Invisible Wall"	Fuji Hakayito, KD Lang, the Christopher Dancers.	A red ATV.	Yellow and purple plaid jacket, white shirt, red tie and hanky, beige pants, yellow shoes. Later: Same, but with white pants and brown shoes.	Unknown
Super Dave makes a passionate stand against the colourization of old black and white films. A dance act is planned with "The Christopher Dancers", but as only one of them shows up, Super dismisses him. KD Lang sings "Angel with a Lariat". The lone Christopher Dancer returns and manages to perform a group act, to "ABC" and "The Love You Save" by the Jackson Five. On the compound, Super Dave tries to perform the "Invisible Wall" stunt, in which Fuji will sprinkle Magic Dust on the ground, and Super will drive a car with no brakes through it, and the "Invisible Wall" created by the dust will stop the car before it hits a bulldozer. The Super One gets hurt: The invisible wall does not work, and Super crashes right into the bulldozer. And as if that isn't enough, the bulldozer driver misunderstands Fuji's request to make room for the ambulance and drives forward, flattening the car. Super Dave! Super Dave! Are you all right?: "Yeah, I'm fine. This is exactly what I wanted to happen." The Last Word: "Uh oh, I have no pulse. It looks like I'm not gonna live. Well, at least if I die, I could be on Geraldo Rivera."
13	13	"Chapel"	Super Dave Million Dollar Celebrity Singing Contest	A red motorbike.	Yellow and purple plaid jacket, red tie and hanky, white shirt, black pants, black shoes.	Unknown
Super Dave talks to Leo Thompson, a "Kiss Doctor" who improves people's lives simply by kissing them. He tries it on audience members and it seems to work, but when he tries it on Super Dave, the Super one is less than pleased! Super Dave holds the Million Dollar Contest where a "Mystery Superstar" comes out and plays a song, and viewers have to phone in and guess the title and the artist. At the Super Dave Chapel, Super attempts to do a concentration exercise where Super will tell a joke and Fuji will keep trying to distract him. The Super One gets hurt: Fuji's idea of a distraction is to drop a wrecking ball on Super. He ends up as his signature "Head on Shoes", which miraculously still manages to walk around. Super Dave! Super Dave! Are you all right?: "Sure, putz. I've never felt better in my life." The Last Word: "You know, I may have lost my balance and part of my breath, but at least I still have my dignity." Special Guest Star: Jerry Lee Lewis as the "Mystery Superstar".

== Season 2 (1988) ==
Beginning with season two, episodes of the Super Dave Osborne show would be taped in the much larger Markham theatre in Markham, Ontario, Canada.

No. overall	No. in season	Title	Billboard Guest Stars	Arrival vehicle	Mike Walden's outfit	Original release date
14	1	"Racing Facility"	The Foubrac Brothers, Fuji Hakayito	The Super Dave hydra-hulled speedboat, then later the red Super Dave ATV.	Bright pink corduroy jacket, white shirt, dark red tie with white and black stripes, dark red hanky, white pants. Later: Bright red jacket, red, white and black striped tie, white shirt, white hanky, white pants.	Unknown
Super and Donald show off the new Super Dave Plastic Surgery Area, where Super brings out "Donny Osmond", who has had a massive height reduction. He and Super lip-synch to Donny and Marie's "I'm a Little Bit Country". Jean and Michel Foubrac, from the Super Dave bicycle compound, play "La Marche de Toreador". At the Super Dave Osborne Racing Facility, Fuji explains his new computer system for cars that tells exactly what needs fixing when you pull into a service station. Super Dave attempts to use this system to set a new record for a pit crew stop time on the race track, using the Super Dave Race Car. The Super One gets hurt: "No oil, no gas, no tires. And that's about it. Oh, no brakes. Brakes are important, kids." He crashes into a wall. Super Dave! Super Dave! Are you all right?: "Oh yeah, I'm perfect, putz." The Last Word: A very unpleasant thing he would like someone to do to Fuji with the steering wheel.
15	2	"Jim and Tammy Bakker"	The Super Dave Band, KD Lang	The Super Dave white ATV.	Yellow and bright green floral pattern jacket, green tie and hanky, white shirt, bright beige pants.	Unknown
Steven Kolodny shows his first Super Dave compilation video. Super Dave and the Super Dave Band attempt to play "Stump the Band" with the audience, where audience members name a song, and if the band can't play it, they get a free dinner. KD Lang sings "Rock Stock and Teardrops". Super Dave has had Jim and Tammy Bakker's old house flown into the compound, which Super will attempt a stunt with. In an attempt to purge his soul, he will set fire to the house and ride his Super Dave Atomic Bike through it. The Super One gets hurt: "Jim and Tammy, here I come! Woo-hoo! Torch the living room, and Tammy's bathrobe! Oh it's hot! It's too hot! I'm on fire!" Super Dave comes out the other side, and when the fire is put out, his appearance has changed dramatically. Super Dave! Super Dave! Are you all right?: "Yes, Mike, I'm all right, and I feel like I've had a big weight off my shoulders now, and when I wake up in the morning and look at myself in the mirror, I'm not going to look like a fool anymore." The Last Word: "I don't know why, but I have this sudden urge to shop."
16	3	"Wheel of Good Fortune Contest"	Rusty Lightbody, Liberty Silver, Wheel of Good Fortune Contest	The Super Dave blue helicopter.	Red jacket, white shirt, white hanky, red white and black striped tie, white pants.	Unknown
Super Dave opens the show introducing the "Super Dave Wheel of Good Fortune" contest, where chosen contestant Rusty Lightbody will take part. Super talks to Herb Normis and Louise Duart, who claim they can channel people. Liberty Silver sings "Let It Begin Tonight". Super then returns to the contest, where he will be strapped to the wheel as it spins, and Gary, the head of the Super Dave Archery School, will shoot arrows at him. When an arrow hits any of the prizes on the wheel, be it $500, a Mike Walden Wardrobe, or lunch with Fuji, Rusty will win that prize. The Super One gets hurt: Gary isn't such a good archer after all. Super gets nailed with arrows three times. However, the judges decide to give Rusty a cheque for $1500 anyway, which Super vainly tries to grab back. Super Dave! Super Dave! Are you all right?: "No, I'm not all right this time! I'm dying! There's three arrows in me, okay?" The Last Word: "Why am I saying Good Night Everybody? I've got three arrows in me and I'm spinning!"
17	4	"Presidential Safety Vehicle"	Super Dave Recollection Contest, Bobby McFerrin, Fuji Hakayito	The Super Dave Motorbike.	Red jacket, navy blue tie with bright yellow stripes, white shirt, white hanky, black pants.	Unknown
Super Dave welcomes Tony Cox, head of the network, who is up in the box. He then holds the Super Dave Recollection Contest, where audience members watch a clip of one of Super's stunts, and win prizes for remembering a specific detail about the clip. Two of the clips feature the Super Dave Stunt School from BIZARRE. After the contest, Tony berates Super Dave for how he presents his show, much to Super's annoyance. Bobby McFerrin sings "All I Want". Super and Fuji present their new "Presidential Safety Vehicle" that allows the President of the United States to present himself in a parade. The vehicle features a seat enclosed in safety glass which is height adjustable, and the "Goodwill Hand of Peace" which is a giant hand that waves at the crowds. The Super One gets hurt: "I'm gonna move up about six inches, almost to the top of the glass. You'll see this." Fuji raises the seat much too high, and Super smashes through the enclosed glass ceiling. "Could you lower me down a bit, if it's not too much trouble?" Fuji then lowers the chair much too low, and Super goes right through the floor. "Fuji, can you give me a hand?" (click) "Wrong button." The giant hand then falls on him. The Last Word: A request to tell anyone who sees Fuji to *bleep* off.
18	5	"Girls' Softball Team"	Veronique Beliveau, Glen Campbell	-	Red jacket, red, white and black striped tie, white shirt, white hanky, white pants with black and red check pattern.	Unknown
Super Dave is at the Osborne Memorial Hospital due to an awful accident. He was rehearsing the show introduction with the girls' softball team at the Super Dave Memorial Sports Arena, where a powerful magnet caused a bus to run into him. Back at the studio, Veronique Belliveau sings "Make a Move on Me". The doctor is wheeling Super in for an operation to remove the fragments of magnet from his body. Glen Campbell sings "Light Years" and "Gentle on My Mind". The operation was a success, despite the fact that the doctor's surgical instruments kept getting stuck to Super. The Super One gets hurt: They weren't able to remove the magnet completely. A water fountain and a cart nail him as he tries to leave the hospital. The Last Word: "Oh, that was right in the spinal cord! Oh, that hurt!"
19	6	"Christmas Human Cannonball"	Liona Boyd, Bob Speca, Fuji Hakayito	The Super Dave "Sleigh Jeep".	Red jacket, red, white and black striped tie, white hanky, white shirt, white pants. Later: Green jacket, dark red and pale green striped tie, red hanky, white shirt, red pants.	Unknown
It's the annual holiday show! Super shows off his Super Dave Walk of Fame and presents Mike Walden with his very own star. Liona Boyd plays "Parranda" and "Can't Help Falling in Love". Super Dave introduces Bob Speca, a student of his who shows off his big domino layout. Fuji helps Super prepare his "Christmas Human Cannonball" stunt, where he will be shot out of a cannon, do a triple flip, land in a chimney, come out of the fireplace, and deliver presents to children. The Super One gets hurt: "Merry... too far! Oh!" He gets fired too far, but then he ends up in a net, and assures the audience he's okay. Then he tries to jump off the net and ends up falling flat on his face. The Last Word: "Normally, I'd go to the hospital right now, but I've got some important presents to deliver. Happy holidays, everyone!"
20	7	"Kid Land"	Larry King, Colin James, Bernie Weinthal, Fuji Hakayito	The Super Dave red, white and blue ATV.	Pale pink corduroy jacket, white shirt, dark red tie and hanky, white pants, white shoes.	Unknown
Super Dave talks with Larry King who has accused him of having plastic surgery merely to improve his looks, and Super tries to prove he only gets it for health reasons by showing tapes of his various stunts. Colin James performs "Voodoo Thing". Super shows off the plans of his new "Super Dave Kid Land" which includes Fuji's new invention, the "Coaster Carousel", a variable speed merry go round which can go slow to super fast and prevents falling off caused by sudden stopping. The Super One gets hurt: The carousel goes faster and faster, stops with apparently no harm done. But due to a flaw in Fuji's design, the momentum is really built up, and Super flies out the window a few seconds after. The Last Word: "I'm going to Disneyland! I'm going to stop off at the hospital first and get a wooden horseshoe taken out of my *quack*, but I'm going!"
21	8	"Hands Across the Land Charity Drive"	Tommy Conrad, KD Lang, Super Dave Charity	A red eight-wheeled ATV.	Bright yellow jacket, red check pattern tie, red hanky, white shirt, black pants, black shoes.	Unknown
Super Dave presents Tommy Conrad, a 91-year-old ping pong player, who claims he can play ping pong and lip synch to "Oop Oop Pah Doo" by Billy Thorpe. Super Dave holds the "Hands Across the Land" charity drive, featuring the ultimate charity event where he straps himself to a bell ringer, and people pay to hit his head with a hammer and try to ring the bell. REPEAT: KD Lang sings "Angel with a Lariat". The final event turns out to be a complete success, despite Super getting hit in the head several times. The Super One gets hurt: After being hit on the head numerous times, a little old lady has a go at him. She hits him in the groin, which causes his head to fly up and ring the bell! The Last Word: "Mike, wait for me, I'll go with you."
22	9	"Swim Stadium"	The Razorbacks, Fuji Hakayito	The Super Dave six-wheeled "Subterannean Vehicle".	Bright yellow jacket, red tie and hanky, white shirt, dark blue and white plaid pants, black shoes.	Unknown
Super Dave talks to two women who have had cosmetic surgery done, albeit to a bit of an extreme. The Razorbacks perform "It's Saturday Night". At the new Super Dave Swim Stadium, the Super Dave diving team performs some spectacular dives. Fuji helps Super attempt to perform a quadruple flip from a 40 foot tower into an 8 foot tank. The Super One gets hurt: "All right, I'm going to start out with a full wing span... and... the pool is empty!" Super Dave goes Splat. Fuji then attempts to rectify this mistake and turns on the water. A huge geyser erupts and throws Super into the air, and he plummets to the ground again. Super Dave! Super Dave! Are you all right?: "Oh yeah, putz, I'm perfect." The Last Word: "If my doctor is watching, i just want to say that this week I broke my back, last week I broke my neck, the week before I broke my knees. Stop bugging me about my cholesterol!"
23	10	"Nunji"	Dan & Paula Hankins, Donald Glanz, Fuji Hakayito	The Super Dave motorboat, and then later the Super Dave motorcycle.	White jacket, black hanky, black tie with little grey stripes, white shirt, black pants. Later: Black jacket, dark red and black striped tie, white shirt, no hanky, grey pants.	Unknown
Super and Donald open the new mime area on the compound, where several students are shown and Super Dave's prize mime performs his "Bubblegum City" act. Dan and Paula Hankins are scheduled to perform a duet singing "Touch Me in the Morning" by Diana Ross, but the couple unfortunately broke up and Dan comes up with the solution of performing the duet all by himself in becoming a man and woman combination. Fuji assists Super with performing the "Nunji" stunt, which is essentially Super blindfolding himself and driving a race car, and Fuji will give him a surprise at some point. The Super One gets hurt: "I wonder what my third Nunji is?" The "surprise" turns out to be a crane picking up the car and putting it into a crusher. Super Dave! Super Dave! Are you all right?: "Oh yeah Mike, I'm fine. That was just one terrific Nunji." The Last Word: A poem about his Nunji: "This Nunji was tough, as you can plainly see, My body is not connected, I'm footloose and fancy free, I'm held by a thread, I'm even afraid to cough, So let me just say goodnight, and Fuji, *honk honk*." ("Sorry we beeped that, it's just that my kidney accidentally hit the horn")
24	11	"Car Alarm"	The Super Dave Band, Fuji Hakayito	The Super Dave motorbike.	Yellow and purple plaid jacket, red tie, white hanky, white shirt, black pants.	Unknown
Super Dave and his lawyer Bernie Weinthal are at municipal court trying to stop an embarrassing book from being published, which claims Super treats his workers like dirt. Back at the studio, Super and the Super Dave Band play "Name That Song" with the audience, where they have a chance to win prizes. Fuji demonstrates his new state of the art car alarm which uses a computer to tell whether or not a specific person is trying to get in the car, and the car reacts appropriately. The Super One gets hurt: The car responds to Super trying to start the car by blowing up. The Last Word: "Fuji, I need help. Mike, help me. Somebody. Does anybody know I'm dying here?" Super Dave Band leader: "We know that one!" (they play "Copacabana")
25	12	"Rambo"	Donald Glanz, Jenny Jones, Fuji Hakayito	The Super Dave motorbike.	Red jacket, white pyjama pants with horizontal black stripes, white, black and red striped tie, white hanky, white shirt.	Unknown
Super and Donald give a tour of the Super Dave five star kitchen. The kitchen is divided into smoking and non smoking sections, so that smoking customers have smoking cooks prepare their food, and vice versa. Mario, the head chef, turns out to be an aspiring opera singer. Jenny Jones performs standup. Super and Fuji demonstrate a stunt from the new Rambo movie by having Super locked in handcuffs and put into a chained up footlocker. Super's goal is to escape before something awful happens. The Super One gets hurt: He doesn't manage to escape before a steamroller flattens him. The Last Word: "I always dreamed of having a star in cement but this is ridiculous."
26	13	"Rocket Bike Straight to Hell"	Surprise Guest, KD Lang, Fuji Hakayito	A gold hotrod.	Pale yellow jacket, pale yellow tie with tiny grey circles, red hanky, white shirt, black pants.	Unknown
Super presents Steve Allen with the Super Dave Academy Hall of Fame Award for his incredible comedic skills. Steve performs his "Letters to the editor" sketch. KD Lang sings "I'm Down to My Last Cigarette". Super introduces the "Super Dave Cycle Troupe" who perform bicycling feats. Super prepares to perform his "Rocket Bike Straight to Hell" where Super will go around a loop, do a flip, and land on another ramp. In addition, Fuji will drive a truck under the ramp with a ring of fire on the roof. However, just when Super is about to get on the loop, he is distracted when a piece of the ramp falls off. The Super One gets hurt: "All right, we'll start over. Tell Fuji that we'll start with one…" Fuji, however, has not been distracted, and drives the truck through, which mows Super down. Super Dave! Super Dave! Are you all right?: "Oh yeah, putz, I'm perfect. I just wanted to get out of the sun for a minute. I'm fine, no problem." The Last Word: He asks Fuji to drop him off at a graveyard so he can visit himself.
27	14	"Daredevil Athlete Entertainer of the Decade"	Ed Jackman, The Razorbacks, Fuji Hakayito	-	Sky blue jacket, red tie with white stripes, red hanky, white shirt, black pants.	Unknown
Super Dave announces it is cameraman Ed Jackman's birthday. Super wants him to sing, but Ed wants to juggle instead. The Razorbacks sing "Lower Beverly". At the office of Super Dave's personal physician, Dr Sidney Karlman, Super is presented with an award from the International Medical Association for the Daredevil Athlete Entertainer of the Decade. Super is so touched he gives special hugs to both Mike and Dr Karlman (he doesn't throw the award away either). We are treated to a replay of the "Balloon Ball" stunt from BIZARRE. The Super One gets hurt: The doctor informs Super that he will be receiving another award shortly for the "Man who has had the most X-rays on the planet". As a result of all those x-rays, Super's arm falls off. The Last Word: "Jack, if you can hear me in the booth, take a shot of the wastebasket. I'm waving goodnight."
28	15	"Atomic Stretch"	Ronn Lucas, Fuji Hakayito	The Super Dave white jeep, then later the Super Dave mini mobile.	Yellow and purple plaid jacket, red tie, red hanky, white shirt, black pants. Later: Pale yellow jacket, red tie and hanky, white shirt, dark blue and white plaid pants.	Unknown
Super Dave has been accused by "Business Week" of selling himself out. Super attempts to dispel this by showing how fair the prices are on all his merchandise, and how he is willing to set a limit. Ronn Lucas shows how to make a puppet with old socks, creating a lady puppet and a turtle. Super Dave gets strapped into a chair and attempts to hold on to the back of the Super Dave pickup truck for 30 seconds while Fuji tries to drive it away. However, he only manages to hold on for 29 seconds and calls it quits. The Super One gets hurt: "Wait a minute! Untie my hands first!" Mike gives the signal for Fuji to drive off. Super's arms get stretched out very long, then an ambulance runs over them when it arrives. Super Dave! Super Dave! Are you all right?: "Oh, sure putz! I'm perfect! Why don't you stretch my tongue out? I could be a tripod!" The Last Word: "Please don't feel sorry for me because I have 17 foot long arms. At least now I can finally hug Oprah Winfrey." ("Don't get upset, Oprah. I know you lost all that weight, but like all the rest of us you'll eventually put it back on. So have some cookies and milk and enjoy the joke.")
29	16	"Film Stunt Area"	Robert Gruenberg, Jakob Armen, Donald Glanz	The Super Dave hovercraft, then later the Super Dave motorcycle.	Turquoise and green paisley pattern jacket, white tie, shirt, hanky, and pants. Later: Black and white check jacket, white tie, white shirt and hanky, grey pants.	Unknown
At the Super Dave Confidence Training Area, Donald explains how they prevent people escaping from the chambers. Robert Gruenberg juggles three burning chainsaws in a circle of fire. Jakob Armen is supposed to do a drum solo, but he is too scared to come out of his dressing room so little Jakob Armen Jr performs a solo in his place. At the Super Dave Film Stunt Area, Donald shows how a scene of a car being riddled with bullets works, by simply cutting the shot to a dummy car with a dummy Super Dave as the driver. The shooting is triggered by saying a secret word. The Super One gets hurt: "You know what? You were close. It was 'toll'…" He accidentally says the secret word again, and the real Super gets shot at continuously. The Last Word: He announces the area is now closed.
30	17	"Rocket Chair Ride to Excitement"	Bobby McFerrin, Fuji Hakayito	The Super Dave dirt bike.	Sky blue jacket, white and dark blue striped tie, white shirt, white pants and hanky.	Unknown
Super attempts to rectify his mistake with the "Butt-Cam" in an earlier episode, and tries to demonstrate the new model, which to his disappointment turns out to be a "Cleavage-Cam" worn by a woman. Bobby McFerrin sings "Don't Worry Be Happy". At the Super Dave Circus Area, Tom Farley from the North American Academy of Arts and Television Sciences presents Super with a hall of fame award for his street dancing act from BIZARRE. Fuji helps Super perform the "Rocket Chair Ride to Excitement" stunt, where he will be launched from a rocket chair onto a trapeze, where he will float on a parasol down to a bike which he will use to ride a wire. The Super One gets hurt: Just when Fuji is about to press the button to launch the chair, Fuji sneezes and accidentally presses the wrong button. The chair launches Super Dave way too far. The Last Word: Pleading with Spanky for help.
31	18	"Chair Ski Ride to Death"	Donald Glanz, Smothers Brothers, Fuji Hakayito	The Super Dave motorbike and sidecar.	Pale yellow tie with tiny black circles, blue shirt, white pants, and accidentally Fuji's cardigan, which he swaps for a red, purple and black plaid jacket with no hanky.	Unknown
60 minutes has attempted to denounce the Super Dave Weight Loss Centre as a fraud. Donald attempts to prove them wrong by showing a tape of four overweight women from 2 months ago, then bringing the women out now after they lost all that weight. Super Dave has also been accused by "Time" magazine of keeping a three million dollar satellite dish for himself rather than using it for the show. He attempts to denounce this by having the Smothers Brothers all the way from Los Angeles on the monitor. They sing "Boil Them Cabbage Down" and get messed up when Tom misses his cue. At the Super Dave Tarmac, Fuji helps Super perform the "Chair Ski Ride to Death" stunt, where Super will sit on a chair with skis, and a rocket powered truck will pull him and make him go up a kick ramp and jump a bus. The Super One gets hurt: "Ready, get set, go! Oh my lord…" Fuji accidentally puts the truck in reverse and backs over him. Super Dave! Super Dave! Are you all right?: "Isn't it apparent to you that I am NOT all right?" The Last Word: "Wait a minute, Mike! Perhaps you could first untie my hands!" (he gets dragged off)
32	19	"Special Effects Studio"	Surprise Guest, Donald Glanz	The Super Dave red ATV.	Red jacket, white shirt, yellow and black striped tie, white hanky, navy blue pants, black shoes.	Unknown
Super introduces Roy Firestone from ESPN, who does impressions of celebrities singing the national anthem (with a huge portrait of himself in the background). The studio has taken two people at random, Eric Varelas and Amelie Demay, from the audience and given them makeovers and new outfits, and they also perform a dance act. Super and Donald give a tour of the new Super Dave Special Effects Studio, demonstrating driving through a fake concrete wall, a fake gunfight, and finally the rain room, where a pipe grid overhead simulates a rainstorm. The Super One gets hurt: "All right, let's really make it come down!" Donald cranks the rain too high, and the grid falls on him. The Last Word: Super Dave sings: "I'm singing in the rain, / just singing in the rain, / what a glorious feeling / I'm happy again / so... oh who the *honk* am I kidding?" Special Guest Star: Roy Firestone from ESPN.
33	20	"90-90 Ride to Death"	Ronn Lucas, Fuji Hakayito	A rocket railroader sled.	Pale purple jacket, purple tie with white polka dots, white shirt, white pants, white hanky and shoes.	Unknown
Super Dave shows how insulting it is that "Eye on the City" programs simply use beautiful women to attract viewers. Ronn Lucas brings a kazoo and a microphone to life, and performs with Buffalo Billy the cowboy singing "The Auctioneer" by Leroy Van Dyke. While waiting for Fuji to arrive, Super shows off his new Train Museum area, including several miniature trains, an actual train bell, and the smallest model train in the world. Super plans to do his "90-90 ride to death", where he will speed up on his sled, and a helicopter will fly toward him and hook onto his helmet with a chain and carry him off. The problem is, they need the weather report from Fuji first. The Super One gets hurt: He gets run over by a train. Fuji gets off it with the report saying that Super better not do the stunt due to bad weather. The Last Word: (He's too far away.)
34	21	"Best of Super Dave"	The Best of Super Dave, The Super Dave Band, Dan & Paula Hankins	-	Red jacket, red, white and black striped tie, white shirt, black pants, white hanky.	Unknown
Super Dave is in the hospital due to another mishap. We are treated to a best of Super Dave show, featuring the Super Dave band playing "Stump the Band", Super Dave and a miniature Donny Osmond lip-synching to "I'm a Little Bit Country", Dan/Paula Hankins with his one man duet, and Steve Kolodny's video compilation. Super ends by showing his disdain for having to do a clip show. The Super One (doesn't) get hurt: Turns out his injuries were just a ruse to boost ratings. The Last Word: He expresses his pleasure that they made a fortune with this clip show, and vows next year he'll do five of them.

== Season 3 (1989) ==
No. overall	No. in season	Title	Billboard Guest Stars	Arrival vehicle	Mike Walden's outfit	Original release date
35	1	"Boxing Academy"	Popeye the Super Dog, Kim Carnes, Evander Holyfield, Fuji Hakayito	The Super Dave motorbike and sidecar, then later the Super Dave monster truck.	Pink and purple plaid jacket, pale purple pants and hanky, white tie and shirt. Later: Pale yellow jacket, red, white and dark blue striped tie, red hanky, white shirt, white pants.	November 4, 1989
At the Super Dave Dancing Animal area, Super shows off Popeye the Super Dog who has been trained to dig for loose change. He then dances and sings to "Land of a Thousand Dances" by Wilson Pickett in front of a tiger, a lion, and a leopard. Kim Carnes sings "Heartbreak Radio". Fuji and Super give a tour of the Super Dave Boxing Academy, where we meet Evander Holyfield, who Super hopes to make into the next heavyweight champion. The Super Dave Band is also present to play the national anthem as motivation. The new training program involves studying videos of your opponent, using a computer to find which fighter you are most like, and sparring with a boxing robot. The Super One gets hurt: "It's not going to work!" The robot punches him so hard, he goes flying out the window. The Last Word: "We have a rule at the compound that if you're knocked down, you have to take a mandatory eight count, even if you're not hurt. So I'll see you in eight weeks."
36	2	"End Highway Profanity Tour"	Melissa Manchester, Donald Glanz, Fuji Hakayito	The Super Dave white jeep.	Blue jacket, red, white and dark blue striped tie, white shirt, white hanky, white pants. Later: Dark grey paisley pattern jacket, dark red tie and hanky, white shirt and pants.	Unknown
The compound is celebrating its 20 millionth visitor and fans are lining up for autographs. In an effort to avoid the crowds, Donald takes Super on a shortcut through several passages and stairways to get to the stage. Melissa Manchester sings "Walk On By". Super is getting ready to do his singalong bus tour to "End Highway Profanity", and he and Fuji show off the bus he will be riding in. Fuji drives the bus off as Super sits on the roof playing the piano and singing along to "King of the Road" by Roger Miller. The Super One gets hurt: Fuji drives the bus through a tunnel and he gets knocked off along with his piano and all the roof furniture. The Last Word: He sings "On the Road Again".
37	3	"Atomic Yo-Yo"	Carl Hodges, Robbie Knievel, Fuji Hakayito	A red 6-wheel ATV.	Grey and black paisley pattern jacket, dark red tie and hanky, white shirt, white pants. Later: Red, purple and pink plaid jacket, white pants, red tie, white hanky, white shoes.	Unknown
Super opens the show with a piano solo and shows how he improved the piano by adding a water fountain, a parasol, and a player piano device. Super introduces his electrician, Carl Hodges, whose birthday is today. Super decides to let him perform, and he does impressions of Johnny Cash singing "Ring of Fire", Elvis Presley singing "Heartbreak Hotel", and "The Gambler". Super presents stuntman Robbie Knievel with a hall of fame award for his jump over the Caesars Palace fountain in Vegas (he doesn't throw it away). Fuji and Robbie help Super perform the "Atomic Yo-Yo Through Life" stunt, where Super gets into a giant Yo-yo and a giant hydraulic hand will raise it up and down. The Super One gets hurt: "Wait a minute, gentlemen... I'm in the yoyo here!" Before they can attach the rope, one of his crew accidentally bumps the Yo-Yo and he goes rolling down the hill and down the cliff. The Last Word: "Well, I guess it could have been worse. With a fall like that, I could have broken my neck. Come to think of it, I did break my neck. I guess it was just my time to get hurt." Special Guest Star: Kenny Rogers as Carl Hodges, and Robbie Knievel helping Super with his Yo-Yo stunt.
38	4	"Be Kind to Animals Area"	Super Dave Marching Band, Banig, Fuji Hakayito	The Super Dave white golf cart.	Bright blue jacket, red tie with white stripes, white shirt and hanky, white pants.	Unknown
Super plays "Name That March" with the audience, where they guess what marching song and formation the Super Dave Band performs. Banig sings "Billy". At the Super Dave "Be Kind to Animals" area, Super presents the automotive bull fight ring as an alternative to bullfighting, where they use cars instead of bulls. Fuji, as the bull, drives a giant blue tank with horns on the roof, while Super acts as the matador and drives a little red car and they have a spectacular chase around the arena. The Super One gets hurt: "Mike, you have my keys! Michael! Oh, what could be worse than losing my keys?" As Super gets back into his golf cart, Fuji runs over it with the tank. The Last Word: An appeal to the people to donate to "Save the Dumb Animals".
39	5	"Atomic Jack in the Box"	Liona Boyd, Gene Catron, Fuji Hakayito	The Super Dave red motorbike and sidecar, then later the Super Dave sleigh.	Bright red jacket, red white and navy striped tie, blue shirt, white hanky, white pants. Later: Bright turquoise jacket, red and green striped tie, white shirt, red hanky, red pants.	Unknown
It's the annual holiday show, but Super is not feeling festive. He is being traded by the network, despite Bernie Weinthal's efforts to fight it. Liona Boyd plays "Carnival" and "Silent Night". Super shows off the new billiard pool area and introduces his prize student Gene Catron, who has made a setup of dominoes, cues, triangles, and billiard balls. Fuji helps Super perform the "Atomic Jack in the Box" stunt, where Super will get into a giant Jack in the Box, "Pop Goes the Weasel" will play, and Super will be shot up to the top of a giant Christmas tree and sing a holiday song. The Super One gets hurt: The lid fails to open when Super pops up, and as a result he becomes the Head on Shoes, which his crew then kicks to the top of the tree. After some protestation, he sings his song anyway. The Last Word: He sings "Twelve Days of Christmas."
40	6	"Noise Pollution House"	Super's Senior Citizens' Football Team, Colin James, Donald Glanz	The Super Dave white ATV.	Pink jacket, red, white and grey striped tie, white shirt and hanky, white pants and shoes.	Unknown
Super shows off his senior citizens' football team, showing videos of his training sessions and exercises. Super brings them all up on stage after they played their big game. Colin James performs "Chicks 'n Cars (And the Third World War)". Super and Donald give a tour of their "Noise Pollution House", whose ambience and interior decoration allows the tenant to just ignore the various noises from outdoors when their house is in a noisy area, by playing soothing sounds and having relaxing pictures. They demonstrate the house being in a freeway area, near an airport, near a police station, and near a train track. The Super One gets hurt: "Get a train sound. I gotta do it. Quickly, because I got a stunt to do! Any kind of train sound! Make woo-woo with your mouth!" Donald has a train drive through the house. The Last Word: (He's too far away)
41	7	"Storybookland - Three Little Pigs"	Super Dave Salutes Sweeps Week, Fuji Hakayito	The hippo-boat.	Green jacket, pale yellow tie with little black circles, white shirt and hanky, pale yellow pyjama pants with black and white race cars.	Unknown
Super Dave introduces "Sweeps week", and the network is trying to boost ratings by having Super talk to attractive women in the audience. A young man, Alistair Wilson, when asked to throw it to Mike Walden when Super leaves, instead drags it out by lip-synching to Barry Manilow's "I Write the Songs". Super and Fuji give a tour of the new "Storybookland" area of the compound, where families can come visit and re-enact their favourite children's stories. Super and Fuji re-enact the Three Little Pigs, where Super plays the pig and Fuji plays the big bad wolf. The Super One gets hurt: "Well, you took care of the stick house and the straw house, how are you going to blow down my brick house? Huh?" The big bad wolf can't blow down the house of bricks, so he blows it up instead. With dynamite. The Last Word: "Well, that's my show. I hope you enjoyed it. I know I had a blast."
42	8	"Ride the Wild Goose"	Robert Gruenberg, Jose the Gardener, Blue Rodeo, Fuji Hakayito.	The Super Dave hovercraft, then later the Propane Copter Vehicle.	Red jacket, pale yellow tie with little black circles, white shirt and hanky, white pants. Later: Bright blue jacket, blue, white and black striped tie, white shirt and hanky, white pants.	Unknown
At the Super Dave Confidence Building Area, Super and Donald introduce Jose the Gardener, who sings a lively tune and plays the guitar. As a boost to his confidence, Robert Gruenberg has been allowed to play basketball outside, and he juggles a bowling ball, an apple, and a chainsaw. Blue Rodeo performs "How Long". A young man named James tells a golf joke before sending it to Mike Walden. Super and Fuji show off the new Super Dave Water Park, where Super tries out the world's highest tube water slide, called "Ride the Wild Goose", while blindfolded to make it more exciting. The Super One gets hurt: "All right, I think I should be coming out now! I'm coming to the bottom! Here I come!" The slide ends at the top of a cliff, and he plummets down to the beach. The ambulance then fails to secure him in the back as they drive off, and he falls out and gets dragged by a rope. The Last Word: "Guys, could you at least turn me over? I'd like to get an even tan." Jose the Gardener's Song: My name's Jose Gonzalez / And I come from Monterey / I came down to the border / One bright and sunny day / I told the immigration / May I go to USA? / They look at me and laugh / And this is what they say No way, Jose / No way you go to USA / No way, Jose / If you don't have your papers / You don't go to USA; But I am very stubborn / And I jumped the fence next day / I took the Greyhound bus / And I went to east L.A. / I wound up washing dishes / For fifty cents a day / I told the man I want a raise / And this is what he say No way, Jose / No way you get a raise today / No way, Jose / If you don't have your green card / You don't get a raise today Caramba, how I suffered / On several night and day / I met a man named Bruce / And this is what he say / I give you plenty money / And a place where you can stay / But then he tried to kiss me / I think that he was gay! No way, no way!
43	9	"Happy Birthday Super - 50s Style!"	Michel Lauziere, Banig, Donald Glanz, Fuji Hakayito	-	Blue jacket, blue and white striped tie, white pants and hanky, white shoes	Unknown
Michel Lauziere does juggling, plays "Happy Times Are Here Again" on a bicycle pump, and gets his entire body into a giant balloon. Banig sings "Wind Beneath My Wings" by Bette Midler. Mike, Donald, and Bernie throw a special surprise birthday party for Super, and they celebrate by giving Super his own 1950s Malt shop and presenting him with a three layered cake. They round off the party by showing Steve Kolodny's latest compilation video. The Super One gets hurt: "I just wish Fuji had been able to share this moment with us and see this cake." In an effort to make the restaurant more authentic, Fuji drives a Studebaker through the wall, and it runs right over him. The Last Word: "Let's just try to enjoy the last few minutes of my birthday. Actually, more like the last few minutes of my life."
44	10	"Lumberjack Area"	Kim Carnes, Doug and the Slugs, Donald Glanz	The Super Dave red jeep.	Red jacket, white shirt and hanky, red, white, sky blue and black striped tie, white pants, black shoes	Unknown
Super and Donald give a tour of the new lumberjack area, showing the axe throwing range, the two man log sawing competition, the woodchopping area, the chainsaw sculpting area, the log rolling pool, the log cabin area, and finally the log climbing area. Super is going to climb a forty foot log, sit in a chair at the top, and ring a bell. In the studio, Kim Carnes sings "Just to Spend Tonight with You". Super's climb seems to be going well. Doug and the Slugs sing "Love Shines". Super finally reaches the top, and reveals the log is also a ride called "Timber" where the log will rise up, then fall over into a bag. The Super One gets hurt: "Ready, timber into the bag! Here we go... wrong way! Stop! No!" The tree falls into a log cabin. The Last Word: Comments on how it took his staff 30 seconds to make a chair and it only took 10 for him to make a coffin.
45	11	"Touchdown for Dollars Contest"	Touchdown to Dollars Contest Winner John Petterson, Michel Lauziere, Ronn Lucas, Fuji Hakayito	The Super Dave white buggy.	Green jacket, white shirt and hanky, grey and black paisley pattern tie, white pants and shoes.	Unknown
Super introduces John Petterson, the winner of the Super Dave Touchdown for Dollars contest. Harley Carlson, the director of the North American Sports Federation, presents Super with an award inducting him into the hall of fame. Michel Lauziere attempts to impress Super once again by playing "Oh! Susanna" on bells. Ronn Lucas performs with Scorch the dragon, who sings "It's Not Easy Being Green" and his own "Dragon Rap". Super, Fuji, and John Petterson round off the show with the touchdown to dollars, where Super will sit in a giant football, and a giant hydraulic arm will throw it towards a target for a chance to win prizes. The Super One gets hurt: Instead of throwing it through the air, the arm spikes the ball into the ground. Mike decides to award John with a cheque for $1500 and a red satin jacket, which Super vainly tries to grab. The Last Word: "Touchdown to Dollars? It's more like Touchdown to Death."
46	12	"Super Dave Cola"	Thelma Houston, Donald Glanz, Fuji Hakayito	The Super Dave white jeep.	Red jacket, white shirt, white hanky and pants, red, white and navy striped tie. Later: Green and yellow flower pattern jacket, pale green tie, white shirt and hanky, yellow pants, white shoes.	Unknown
Super and Donald show off their "recycling house" where old junk is made into useful items and furniture for the home. Donald shows Super how he turned his old motorbike into a toilet. Thelma Houston sings "Lean on Me". Fuji helps Super advertise his new drink, "Super Dave Cola" which is a healthy soft drink. Super drives the "Super Dave Cola Car", which is a motorized vending machine, around the compound while the Super Dave Cola Jingle plays! The Super One gets hurt: "Hi everyone! How are you doing? Goodbye…" Fuji accidentally runs over him with the cola truck while trying to find his way out of the compound. Fuji then backs over him to ask Mike for further directions, and drags him off. Super Dave! Super Dave! Are you all right?: "Oh yeah, I'll let you know as soon as I come of shock." The Last Word: Pleading with Mike for help. The Super Dave Cola Jingle: Do you want to put a smile on your face? / Do you want to end up in first place? / Do you want to have a good time with a drink you're trying? / Then drink Super Dave Cola! Do you want to walk around with a smile? / Do you never want to be out of style? / Do you want to feel great even when you're sleeping? / Then try Super Dave Cola! You'll know as soon as you try it, / Why the world's starting to make a fuss, / The soft drink they call Super Dave Cola! Do you want to be a star overnight? / Do you want to make the world see the light? / Do you want to have the joy of a new sensation? / Then try Super Dave Cola!
47	13	"Exercise Centre"	Jenny Jones, Donald Glanz	The Super Dave white moped.	Red, black and purple plaid jacket, red tie and hanky, white shirt and pants. Later: Pink jacket, pink, purple and grey swirl pattern tie, white shirt and hanky, white pants.	Unknown
At the Super Dave memorial sports park, Super is busy training his senior citizens' baseball team. We also see footage of Super training Senior Citizens to play basketball. Back in the studio, Super presents a lost dog they found on the compound, who does frisbee catches. Jenny Jones performs standup. Super and Donald present the Super Dave Exercise Centre, where Donald shows off his various inventions. The tour ends with the "Sports Chair" where users watch a sporting event and use equipment such as a baseball bat or golf club or tennis racket to simulate taking part in the event. The Super One gets hurt: He turns on an auto race, and the chair simulates it by rocketing him into the screen. The Last Word: Advising the audience to stick to gentler sports when using the chair. And to stretch afterwards.
48	14	"Remote Control Models Area"	Dan Hill, William Tyler, Fuji Hakayito	The Super Dave white motorbike.	Pink jacket, pink, purple and grey swirl pattern tie, white shirt and hanky, white pants.	Unknown
Super brings up one of his camera cable pullers, William Tyler, who performs a badly done dance routine and magic trick, then does an act with his dummy Lester. Dan Hill sings "Sometimes When We Touch". Super and Fuji give a tour of the new Remote Control Models area, demonstrating boats, cars, and planes. Fuji is flying a remote control Cessna plane, but the sound distracts Super so he asks Fuji to turn it off. The Super One gets hurt: "Gee, what a great way to spend a day." Unluckily, the plane Fuji is flying turns out to be an actual plane, which falls right on top of him. Super Dave! Super Dave! Are you all right?: "Just read my eulogy, putz. I'm a dead man." The Last Word: "I'd be crying right now, like most athletes do when they end their career, but I can't. My tear ducts are underneath my shoes."
49	15	"Golf Course"	Mitchell Zeidwig, The Razorbacks, Fuji Hakayito	The Super Dave helmet shaped golf kart.	Pale yellow jacket, multicoloured horizontal striped tie, white shirt, black hanky, black pants and shoes.	Unknown
Super brings up motivational speaker Mitchell Zeidwig, who claims you can do anything if you just put your mind to it and say "I Can Do It". Super doubts this philosophy and has Mitchell play the piano, which he's never done before, and then has Mitchell perform increasingly outrageous stunts while continuing to play. The Razorbacks sing "My Way or Highway". Super and Fuji show off the new Super Dave Golf Course, where Super Dave shows his own special swing. The Super One gets hurt: "Fuje, let me ask you one question. I've got water over here, I've got sand over here. That's kind of difficult, but I'm here in one and I'm shooting for a double eagle. What makes this hole so difficult?" A tree falls on him. Super Dave! Super Dave! Are you all right?: "Oh yeah, I'm perfect. Does movement indicate if I'm all right? Well, I'm not moving, putz. I need help." The Last Word: "Maybe someone could call the city dump and fill in my divot."
50	16	"Comedy Park Area"	Kelita, Rummy Bishop, Jerry Reed, Donald Glanz	The comedy car.	Pale yellow jacket, multicoloured horizontal stripe tie, red hanky, white shirt and pants, big purple clown shoes.	Unknown
Super is at the hospital because of a mishap while he and Donald were giving a tour of the new comedy park area. Super tried out the Comedy Ride and went through the Surprise Tunnel. The surprise turned out to be the car blowing up and Super getting hosed in the face. Back in the studio, Kelita sings "The Strong One". Super is visited in the hospital by Rummy Bishop, who Donald believes is Super's favourite comic. Jerry Reed sings "Guitar Man". It seems Super is going to be okay, but they decide to send him for more x-rays just to be sure. The Super One gets hurt: "Careful guys! All right, and... no floor." The orderlies accidentally wheel him into an empty elevator shaft. The Last Word: (He's down the shaft. We can't hear him.)
51	17	"Marine Stadium"	Ed Jackman, Doug and the Slugs, Fuji Hakayito	-	Red jacket, multicoloured horizontal striped tie, white shirt and hanky, white pyjama pants with black check, black shoes.	Unknown
Super allows cameraman Ed Jackman to appear on stage again, and he performs juggling acts. Doug and the Slugs perform "Tomcat Prowl". Fuji and Super show off the new Super Dave Marine Stadium where some dolphins from Marineland perform jumps. Super gets ready to perform his Guinness record breaking stunt where Super will get in the pool, Fuji will remotely trigger rockets strapped to his back, and Super will fly into the air and ring a bell on the ceiling. But the control doesn't work, and Super frustratingly gets out of the water. The Super One gets hurt: Fuji then realizes he forgot to switch the control on, and he activates it. Super is blown away in the wrong direction. The Last Word: "With the little time we have left, I'd like to ask for three favours. One, someone check to see if my insurance is paid up. Two, please include me in your prayers tonight. Three, I could use some help in turning over. I think this side is done."
52	18	"This Old Home"	Fan Appreciation contest, Melissa Manchester, Donald Glanz	The Super Dave red quad.	Pink jacket, pink, grey and blue striped tie, white shirt, white pants, white hanky and shoes.	Unknown
Super holds his fan appreciation contest, where audience members have to try to make a free throw for a chance to win a thousand dollars. Melissa Manchester sings "Oh, Lady Be Good!". Donald and Super give a tour of "This Old Home", a spoof of This Old House. Donald shows his work on the stairs, his new roof garden patio, and the newly renovated study and master bedroom, and finishes by showing off the extensively redone bathroom, featuring a bathtub made into a jacuzzi and a sauna bath. The Super One gets hurt: "You know something, one thing I forgot to ask you, what did we do structurally to reinforce the bathroom?" They didn't do anything to reinforce the bathroom floor. The bathtub comes crashing through the ceiling on top of him and sends him right to the basement. The Last Word: "I've heard of a quick way to add on a second bath, but this is ridiculous."
53	19	"Garbane"	Bill Medley, Donald Glanz	The Super Dave white four door.	Green jacket, grey and black paisley pattern tie, white shirt and pants, white hanky.	Unknown
Super holds a contest where audience members try to do impressions. One does John Wayne, and the other two do Elvis. Bill Medley sings "You've Lost That Lovin' Feelin'". Donald and Super introduce a brand new product called "Garbane", an economical and efficient fuel made from garbage to solve the world's fuel crisis and garbage problem. They also show the new Garbane fuel station. Super does a commercial for Garbane and fills his car to try it for the first time. The Super One gets hurt: "So when you think about it, I don't know any real reason why you shouldn't be using Garbane. Do you?" He starts the car, and it and the nearby station go up in a colossal explosion. Super Dave! Super Dave! Are you all right?: "Of course putz, I'm perfect. Why shouldn't I be? The only thing that happened is I went through the driver's seat into the trunk like a blazing torpedo. I'm fine. I've never felt better." The Last Word: "If only I were Bill Cosby, I could live off my reruns."
54	20	"Diet Park"	Mitchell Zeidwig, Ronn Lucas, Fuji Hakayito	The miniature train ride.	Pink jacket, pink, grey and purple swirl pattern tie, white shirt and hanky, white pants.	Unknown
Super once again brings up motivational speaker Mitchell Zeidwig to prove you can accomplish anything just by saying "I Can Do It". Super once again has him play the piano while performing more increasingly outrageous stunts. Ronn Lucas performs with Buffalo Billy, who is trying to form his own company and do his own ventriloquist act. Super and Fuji show the new Super Dave Diet Park, where people can have fun losing weight. They also show the fishing area, which is a lake filled with polluted fish. The Super One gets hurt: While sitting down to fish, he forgets he's sitting on the log ride track. It runs right over him. The Last Word: "Well, at least I'm in the right area. I can sell myself as bait."
55	21	"Lifting for Health"	Simba the Elephant, Super Dave Makeover, Donald Glanz, Fuji Hakayito	The Super Dave white quad, then later the Super dave red jeep.	Red jacket, red, white and light blue striped tie, white shirt and hanky, white pants. Later: Blue jacket, red tie and hanky, white shirt, grey and black plaid pyjama pants.	Unknown
At the Super Dave animal area, Super explains how the Wall Street Journal accused him of spending money on himself rather than his petting zoo. He and Donald give a tour and finish at Simba the elephant's enclosure where Simba gets tested for Steroids. Back in the studio, the crew have taken a random man and woman from the audience and given them extensive makeovers. One of them then does an impression of Dionne Warwick singing "I'll Never Fall in Love Again". Super and Fuji show off the new mobile lifting for health truck, which will bring weight lifting equipment to people. Super demonstrates the bench press by getting Fuji to bring the weights down from the truck, which Fuji does with great difficulty. The Super One gets hurt: "Now, while you're waiting for more weight, it's a good idea to shut your eyes and dream about the weight you'll be lifting." Fuji comes up with the brilliant idea to get the weights out of the truck faster by tilting the box up. The whole shebang falls on him. Super Dave! Super Dave! Are you all right?: "Oh yeah putz, I'm perfect." The Last Word: "I've heard of having the weight of the world on your shoulders but this is ridiculous."
56	22	"Tennis Court"	Paul Scherman, Savion Glover, Fuji Hakayito	A wheelchair bike, called the "Tennis Exerciser".	Red jacket, red, white and navy striped tie, white shirt and hanky, white pants	Unknown
Paul Scherman plays classical music on his antique violin, which Super proudly shows off to the audience. Savion Glover performs tap dancing to "Cute". Super and Fuji open the new Super Dave memorial tennis stadium, showing off new tennis inventions. They also demonstrate the shielded umpire's tower, which protects the umpire from angry player's wrath. Giving a demonstration, Fuji portrays an angry player, and Super shows how the tower rotates and uses flashing lights to take away a point, a game, and a set from the player. The Super One gets hurt: "Okay, you've lost the match." The tower indicates taking away a match by falling over, with Super still inside. Super Dave! Super Dave! Are you all right?: "Yeah, I'm absolutely perfect. God, what a putz." The Last Word: "I should have traded him for Willard Scott when I had the chance."
57	23	"Super Dave Hall of Fame"	Roy Firestone, Lori Yates, Fuji Hakayito	A very tiny red car.	Yellow jacket, white shirt and hanky, white pants, white and blue striped tie, white shoes.	Unknown
Roy Firestone returns to the show and does standup, doing impressions of Howard Cosell, Mike Tyson, and Keith Jackson. Lori Yates sings "Scene of the Crime". Fuji and Super show off the new Super Dave Hall of Fame, explaining how it will be a museum of his many stunts. In the room with a big wall of monitors, Super shows videos of some of his past stunts. Super explains how the building used to be the recreation area, and the monitor room used to be ping pong tables. Hearing this, Fuji excitedly wants to play ping pong. The Super One gets hurt: "I don't really think we have the time, Fuje." The monitor array falls from the wall on him, turning into a ping pong table. Fuji and Mike happily play a game. The Last Word: Mike asks him if he wants to play, he replies not now because of a headache. Special Guest Star: Roy Firestone from ESPN.
58	24	"Car Safety and Heavy Equipment Area"	William Tyler, Colin James, Fuji Hakayito	The Super Dave red and white quad.	Yellow jacket, red tie and hanky, white shirt, white pants, black shoes	Unknown
Super once again brings up his cable puller William Tyler, who performs with his dummy, Lester, ending with a lively country tune. Colin James sings "Five Long Years" from his self-titled début album. At the Super Dave Car Safety and Heavy Equipment Area, Mike confides in us that he and Fuji will be playing a prank on Super later on, because Super loves blooper shows but he's never been in one. Super gives a tour of the area, showing various heavy vehicles, and the simulator which shows what happens when you don't wear your seatbelt, another simulator to test reaction time, and a device which wakes you up if you doze off driving. The Super One gets hurt: "I don't see anything…" The special blooper turns out to be Fuji smashing a heavy digger shovel on the reflex test car while Super is in it. The Last Word: He calls 911 and says it feels like "Raymond Burr is sitting on my shoulders trying to see the Rose parade". William Tyler and Lester's Song: Checked into this room just a while ago / Called a lady friend that I know / Said I'll ring you right back but she was busy just then / Staying awake, a sick old man Well, I'm sitting in a motel in Morgan city / Looking at a crooked picture on the wall / The TV don't work, I got a headache / And the woman that I'm waiting for / She didn't call at all Thought I would go out somewhere, to get a bite to drink / Hitting the booze, trying not to think / I met a wheeling waitress at a roadside bar / She said she'd meet me at my place, it wasn't very far Well, I'm sitting in a motel in Morgan city / Looking at a crooked picture on the wall / The TV don't work, I got a headache / And the woman that I'm waiting for / She didn't call at all I went back to my room, I laid on my bed / Lean back so I can rest my head / Then the telephone rang cool as a cucumber / I picked it up, it was a wrong number Well, I'm sitting in a motel in Morgan city / Looking at a crooked picture on the wall / The TV don't work, I got a headache / And the woman that I'm waiting for / She didn't call at all
59	25	"Best of Super Dave 2"	The Best of Super Dave, Carl Hodges, Evander Holyfield, Fuji Hakayito	-	(Mike is only seen in Flashbacks.)	Unknown
It's once again time for the best of Super Dave! Audience members name what they want to see. We see Super Dave's electrician Carl Hodges doing his impressions, Super and Fuji playing Three Little Pigs at Storybookland, and finally Evander Holyfield at the Super Dave Boxing Area. Finally, Tony Cox, the president of the network, requests to see the Drive to End Highway Profanity. Super explains that it will be the last show, but Tony Cox insists the show go on, even going as far as to consider offering Super a new contract, which Super automatically assumes means he will be getting three more years. Tony Cox bows to pressure from the audience and renews Super's contract. The Super One (doesn't) get hurt: But Tony Cox's pride sure does. The Last Word: Replay of "King of the Road".

== Season 4 (1990) ==
No. overall	No. in season	Title	Billboard Guest Stars	Arrival vehicle	Mike Walden's outfit	Original release date
60	1	"A House for Ray"	Ray Charles, Donald Glanz, Fuji Hakayito	The Super Dave "Amphi-Vehicle" car boat.	Red jacket, red, white and light blue tie, white shirt and hanky, black check white pyjama pants. Later: Blue jacket, white, black, red and blue striped tie, white shirt and hanky, white pants and shoes	Unknown
On the shores of Lake Osborne, Super explains how Ted Koppel has accused him of signing a major tennis shoe deal and exploiting it. Super and Donald show off the new "Super Dave Ark", which will be used to bring animals from the mainland to his special island zoo. Ray Charles sings "What'd I Say". Super and Fuji show off the special house they built for Ray Charles, and decide to play a little trick on him by rearranging the furniture from one room to another. Super gets in the bed and plans to surprise Ray! The Super One gets hurt: "One thing, Fuji. What did the spare room used to be before we made it a bedroom? The garage?" Ray Charles drives a car in and flattens the bed. The Last Word: "I now know who Ray's talking about when he sings 'Born to Lose'."
61	2	"Recycled Raft Ride"	Loreena McKennitt, Donald Glanz, Fuji Hakayito	The Super Dave white Motorbike with a really cramped sidecar, then later the "Super Dave Holiday Shoe Surprise Car".	Green jacket, red tie and hanky, white shirt and pants, white shoes. Later: Green jacket, red plaid tie, red hanky, white shirt, white pants with black check pattern, white shoes.	Unknown
It's the holiday show! At Super's Souvenir village, Super and Donald show off the area with an anti-pollution theme, and there are many decorations sold at the gift shop made from trash items. They also show the picture area where kids can have their picture taken with Santa. Kids can also take a special ride up the chimney, which Super tries out with disastrous results. Back in the studio, Super has been given $3000 to give to three lucky people in the audience, and he draws three random seat numbers. Loreena McKennitt sings and plays "Greensleeves" on the harp, which also ends in an unfortunate mishap. Back at the souvenir village, Fuji helps Super try out the "Super Dave's Recycled Raft Ride", which is a white water raft ride with a "surprise ending". The Super One gets hurt: "This is going to be fun, I'm not supposed to look." The "surprise" turns out to be a crane picking up the raft and putting it in a car crusher. The Last Word: "Oh, look at this. I found my lips. Now if I could just find my cheek. Let's see, it's not under my knee. No, not under the elbow. Oh, here it is! I've got my lips in my cheek! Now if I just had some mistletoe, I could kiss my life goodbye."
62	3	"Fast Food Restaurant"	Steve Kolodny, Bernie Weinthal, Fuji Hakayito	The Super Dave box van.	Green jacket, white, black and green striped tie, white hanky, pale blue plaid pyjama pants.	Unknown
Steve Kolodny shows off his latest Super Dave compilation video, and Super gives him his own office, which until recently was occupied by Bernie. Michel Lauziere once again tries to do an act on the show, performing musical tricks. Super and Fuji open the new Super Dave Fast Food restaurant, which Super claims will serve healthy food made and served by graduates of the Super Dave food university. Super introduces the chef, who like the previous chef is an aspiring singer. They end the tour by showing how they strive to get an order done in the shortest time by having Fuji order at the drive thru. The Super One gets hurt: "And now, Mr Hakayito, you can drive through and get your order with ten seconds to spare!" Fuji drives right through the restaurant wall and mows him down. He then gets dragged off by the van because Fuji fails to realize he's underneath. The Last Word: "Just take me to a drive through hospital. I could use a new McHeart. And a couple of McLungs. Maybe even a McSpleen!"
63	4	"Storybookland - Red Riding Hood"	Michelle Wright, Fuji Hakayito	The Super Dave swan boat.	Pale yellow jacket, navy blue and white plaid pants, red hanky, red tie, yellow shoes.	Unknown
Danny Menendez, one of the show's electricians, opens the show by juggling. Michelle Wright sings "New Kind of Love". Super and Fuji revisit Storybookland, where there have been new areas added, and they reenact "Little Red Riding Hood", with Super as Red and Fuji as the wolf. The story is supposed to end with Red getting rid of the wolf while he is in grandma's house by triggering the Murphy bed. The Super One gets hurt: "I knew this wouldn't work." Fuji reveals there is no murphy bed, but rather a "murphy chair", which Super activates and gets slammed into the wall. He then gets it again with a "murphy rug". Resigned to his fate, he lies on the bed and tells Fuji to just finish him off. Fuji activates the "murphy wall", which crushes him. The Last Word: Calling for help using his duck whistle.
64	5	"Bungee School"	Sue Medley, Donald Glanz, Bernie Weinthal, Fuji Hakayito	The Super Dave mini quad.	Pale yellow jacket, navy blue and white plaid pants, red hanky and tie, black shoes. Later: Same outfit but with white pants with black check pattern.	Unknown
At the Super Dave Equestrian Academy, Super and Donald give a tour of the stables, showing Super's favourite horse Darla, the horse washing area, and the saddle room. Bernie Weinthal is seen riding a very small mule, and Jean Paul Peret the famous rider performs some dressage exercises, then Super tries out some exercises himself. Sue Medley sings "Dangerous Times". Audience member Dave Ellis tells a parachuting joke before sending it to Mike Walden. At the new Super Dave Bungee School, Fuji explains how they improve discipline and concentration in students by using the mantra "Blue skies, clean air, and the weight is perfect!", and throwing down a dummy weight first. One of Super's prize students, Austin, performs a jump. Super then gets ready to do his own jump. The Super One gets hurt: "Blue skies, clean air, the weight is tied to your waist!" "You're shitting me!" Fuji throws Super's dummy weight off, not realizing that the weight is tied to Super. After the fall, Super then calls for an ambulance, and Fuji decides to bungee one down, right on top of Super. The Last Word: He remarks about how colourful heaven is, then realizes he's actually in Mike's hamper.
65	6	"International Raceway"	A Beach Boys Contest, Laura Branigan, Fuji Hakayito	The Super Dave red moped.	Yellow jacket, blue and white striped tie, white hanky and shirt, white pants	Unknown
Super wants to hold a "Super Dave Beach Boys Contest", where the Beach Boys will perform a song and audience members will sing along to win money. However, the Super Dave Band shows up instead. (The Super Dave Band also causes a surprise when they know a SECOND song.) At the new Super Dave international raceway, Super tries to break his own record doing a lap around the track in the Super Racer. Fuji has improved the track to make it more challenging by hiding land mines on it, which the Super One accidentally hits. Back in the studio, Laura Branigan sings "Never in a Million Years". Super appears to be okay, but he still needs to go to the hospital for testing, so he gets put in an ambulance. The Super One gets hurt: "You know, there are still land mines on this track!" While the paramedics are talking to Mike, the ambulance rolls away and hits another land mine. The Last Word: "Ball game!"
66	7	"Bond Warehouse"	Robert Gruenberg, KD Lang, Donald Glanz, Fuji Hakayito	The Super Dave white motorbike, then later the Super Dave red quad.	Red jacket, red, white and blue striped tie, white hanky and shirt, white pants. Later: Pink jacket, pink and grey paisley pattern tie, white hanky shirt and pants.	Unknown
At the Super Dave Confidence Building Area, Super and Donald once again run into Jose the Gardener. Donald has been trying a new positive reinforcement technique by letting Robert Gruenberg sunbathe. With the promise of ice cold lemonade, Robert finally juggles two bowling pins, and a chainsaw. KD Lang sings "Luck in My Eyes". Super and Fuji give a tour of the compound's Bond Warehouse building, showing special Bond spy equipment. Fuji then helps Super perform the "James Bond Jump", where Super will drive the Bond car out the window, and land on a bag. The Super One gets hurt: "Keep your eye on the window, because here comes Bond... wrong window!" He drives out the wrong window and smashes on the parking lot below. The Last Word: He tries to use his gadgets to escape from the wreckage.
67	8	"Miniature Golf"	Crystal Gayle, Donald Glanz, Fuji Hakayito	-	Pink jacket, pink, white, grey and black striped tie, white hanky and shirt, white pants.	Unknown
Crystal Gayle sings "Never Ending Song of Love", while Super joins in playing the accordion. Fuji and Super give a tour of the new miniature golf course, where every hole features a TV screen with a tape of one of Super's stunts. At the 18th hole, the golfer will get into a big plastic ball, and a giant Super Dave statue will hit them down a special course that looks like a pinball machine towards the hole for a chance to win a million dollars. Super gives it a shot. The Super One gets hurt: "Here comes a hole in one, I'm ready to roll!" The statue hits the ball way too hard, and he goes careening through a billboard. The Last Word: A joke about a golf ball that can't be lost.
68	9	"Geiger Car"	En Vogue, Donald Glanz	The Super Dave red jeep.	Bright blue jacket, red and white striped tie, red hanky, white shirt, white pants. Later: Red and purple plaid jacket, red tie, white hanky, white shirt and pants.	Unknown
Super is upset because the Wall Street Journal has accused him of wrongfully spending money that should be spent on making new areas on the compound for children. Super denounces this by showing the "Old Lady Who Lived in a High Tech Shoe" area. Michel Lauziere once again tries to be on the show by performing stunts using giant balloons. En Vogue sings "Lies". Super and Donald show their new "Geiger Car", which can scan for anything underground and feed it to a computer bank nearby. Super tries it out by driving around the test area while Donald sits at the console, and it works when Super finds something metallic in the ground. The Super One gets hurt: "Train tracks? Double check that. I'm going to back up." A train comes along and smashes into the car. The Last Word: He comments about seeing a strange smoking red object under the train.
69	10	"Safety Mart"	Clarence Clemons, Bernie Weinthal, Fuji Hakayito	A white SUV.	Pink jacket, pink, white, grey and black striped tie, white hanky and shirt, white pants. Later: Pale yellow jacket, pink, white and blue plaid pajama pants, red hanky, white shirt, rainbow striped tie.	Unknown
Super and Bernie are disgusted that the network wants to boost ratings by having scantily clad women on the show. He has some women give their outfits to him so he can show how revealing they are, and rounds it off by having the girls do a dance. Clarence Clemons performs "Garden of Memories". Super and Fuji give a tour of the new Super Dave's Safety Mart, which has advanced security features to deter shoplifters. As an added precaution, the till area has an air jet gun disguised as a pen. The Super One gets hurt: "Let me tell you the beauty of this whole thing. You're looking at a five inch pen that just delivered four tons of atomic air pressure! Normally, when an instrument like this delivers one ton of air pressure, the kickback is like an elephant! But Fuji completely eliminated the kickback! How did you eliminate it, Fuje?" Fuji explains that the kickback is delayed. Super flies through the back wall. The Last Word: "Hey, I got a stamp on my hand. From one of the milk cartons. It says I go bad in 3 seconds."
70	11	"Wind Beneath My Wings"	Randy Travis, The Northern Pikes, Donald Glanz	-	Blue jacket, white and blue striped tie, white hanky and pants.	Unknown
Super is at the hospital yet again. It's the ten year anniversary of the opening of the compound, and Donald was helping him rehearse his big number at the opening where he flies around on wires lip-synching to "Wind Beneath My Wings" by Bette Midler. A miscalculation occurred and he crashed right through the bulb wall. Randy Travis sings "Singing the Blues". Super is incredibly depressed that he is in the hospital during this special evening, and Donald, disgusted that the orderlies just left Super in the hall, finds a nice small room to put him in. The Northern Pikes sing "Kiss Me You Fool". Super is still determined to do the show for his fans, so he has Donald take him back to the studio on his stretcher against the doctor's orders. On his return, the audience gives him a standing ovation. The bulb wall has even been replaced, and the billboard says "We Love You Super". The Super One gets hurt: "I'm dead!" Due to a maintenance error, the new bulb wall only has one speed: Super Fast. It slams down and crushes him. The Last Word: "If I'd known this was going to happen, I would have continued to eat meat."
71	12	"Yacht Car"	Mitchell Zeidwig, Donald Glanz, Fuji Hakayito	The Super Dave white quad, then later the Super Dave 1920s car.	Blue jacket, white and blue striped tie, white hanky and shirt and pants. Later: Same outfit but with red hanky and rainbow striped tie.	Unknown
At the new Super Dave Driving School, Donald and Super reveal their plans for a Senior Citizen Driver Training Program, which has been criticized by Newsweek. Super denounces the claims by having his prize student, Bill, drive the training car. Mitchell Zeidwig performs on the piano with a string quartet, and Super has him play the piano while hanging from a chandelier to earn $1000 for the "I Can Do It" foundation. Super and Fuji show off the new "Yacht Car", which is an RV and a Yacht together that can go on water and on land. Super proudly drives it to the boat ramp while "Beyond the Sea" by Bobby Darin plays. The Super One gets hurt: "You know what? I just realized something. I didn't turn onto the Pillman boat ramp, I turned onto the Pillman pier instead! I forgot, everyone! I'm going to turn around! Look out! Uh oh…" He goes through the railing, and into the soup! The Last Word: "Look at this. I'm on the bottom of the ocean, sitting upside down in a car boat, surrounded by electrical equipment. I could have been shocked."
72	13	"Senior Citizens' Boxing Club"	George Foreman, Jeff Dunham, Donald Glanz	-	Pink jacket, pink, white, grey and navy striped tie, white hanky and shirt, white pants.	Unknown
Super announces that KD Lang is performing on the show again, but it turns out he is mistaken. Jeff Dunham performs with Woozle dummy Peanut, then gets his dummy Walter to help him throw it to Mike Walden. Super and Donald visit the recently opened Senior Citizens' Boxing Club, where Super introduces George Foreman as the trainer. Super shows off his prize students who are better, stronger, and faster thanks to George's training program. Super and George each coach a senior contender to box, and they have a senior citizens' boxing match. The Super One gets hurt: "They wear a protective cup." George demonstrates the importance of an athletic cup by nailing Super in the crotch. Amazingly, he survives. He then calmly asks Donald to drive him in his limo to the Pet Cemetery, where he walks up to an open grave and falls in it. The Last Word: He composes his own eulogy, then despairs about how he doesn't have a will.
73	14	"Parade Village"	Ray Charles, Bernie Weinthal, Donald Glanz, Fuji Hakayito	The Super Dave black jeep.	Red and purple plaid jacket, red tie, white hanky and shirt, white pants. Later: Red jacket, red, pink, white and grey striped tie, white hanky and shirt, white pants.	Unknown
Super and Donald show off Super's new aviary, along with birdwatcher Gerry Bennett. They take a look at several species while Super is the unfortunate target of bird activity. Ray Charles sings "Born to Lose". At the new Super Dave's Parade Village, Super, Mike, Fuji, Donald, and Bernie show an entirely computerized parade. Donald designed the floats, Fuji remotely operates them, Bernie handles the legal problems, and Super uses it to promote his new lip-synching album. The parade gets going while the five of them ride the last float and lip synch to the "Battle Hymn of the Republic", with Super leading from the top of the float. Unfortunately, their float breaks down at a crossroads. The Super One gets hurt: "Well, fix this float. Or we might have an accident!" The rest of the floats work fine, and the parade crashes through the float and mows him down, while the rest of the gang sings on. The Last Word: (He's too far away.)
74	15	"Road to Stardom"	En Vogue, Fuji Hakayito	The Super Dave silver pickup.	Red jacket, red, white and grey striped tie, white hanky, white shirt and pants.	Unknown
En Vogue sings "Hold On". Jacques Henri from Paris, when asked to throw it to Mike Walden, draws it out by performing impressions of Julio Iglesias singing "Funky Cold Medina" by Tone Loc, Def Leppard singing the Mr. Rogers theme, and imitating a saxophone. At the Super Dave Memorial Speedway Stadium, Fuji helps Super perform a stunt where Super will jump 65 feet over five burning cars in his rocket bike, and Super will think of it as his "Road to Stardom". He decides to back up a good distance to get his nerve up, and backs his bike all the way to the highway. The Super One gets hurt: A double trailer Semi runs over him. The Last Word: He tells a "Guy walks into a bar with a dog" joke.
75	16	"Funniest Home Videos Area"	A Tribute to Elvis, Fuji Hakayito	The Super Dave white calliope car.	Pink jacket, pink, white and grey paisley pattern tie, white hanky, white shirt and pants, white shoes.	Unknown
Super is celebrating "Elvis week", and decides to hold an Elvis Recollection Contest, where the Super Dave Band will play an Elvis song, and audience members guess the song title. One of the band, Uno Lanka, performs a balancing act. Fuji and Super give a tour of the new Super Dave Funniest Home Videos area, where families can come and make their own movies with hilarious slapstick action. Super demonstrates a breaking teeter totter and love seat, the closed doggy door, and a dummy getting hit with a golf ball. He ends by giving a tour of a specially rigged house where several bad pranks happen to him, to the point where the whole house collapses. The Super One gets hurt: "I want to get out of here!" A telephone pole falls down and crushes the house. The Last Word: He explains how every "accident" he just had was safe until the telephone pole fell on him.
76	17	"Water Speed Record"	Michelle Wright, Glen Campbell, Fuji Hakayito	The Super Dave white pickup.	Blue jacket, red, white, black and blue striped tie, red hanky, white shirt with black stripes, white pants and shoes.	Unknown
At the Super Dave Marina, Fuji and Super are getting ready to break the water speed record with his boat. He begins by showing off his boat, the SS Super, with its special engine which he hopes to get up to 330 miles per hour with. Back in the studio, Michelle Wright sings "Wide Open". Super manages to break the record, but something goes wrong with the engine so he takes it back to the docks. Glen Campbell sings "Rhinestone Cowboy". The engine is unfortunately shot, and Super is disappointed that he wasn't able to break the record by more. The Super One gets hurt: "Rafael, tell me when the boat's on the trailer." Rafael the hoist operator drops the boat on his truck, and Super is unfortunately inside. The Last Word: "Rafael, your green card is in my wallet."
77	18	"Robosaurus"	Mitchell Zeidwig, Celine Dion, Robosaurus, Fuji Hakayito	The Super Dave white golf cart.	Red jacket, red, white, black and blue striped tie, white hanky and shirt, white pants.	Unknown
Super once again challenges Mitchell Zeidwig to back up his claims by having him perform stunts while playing the piano. At the new Super Dave indoor arena, Fuji helps Super with his "Pent-athalon of Stunts", where he will be doing five dangerous stunts, one for each night. The present stunt is Super going up against "Robosaurus", a giant robot dinosaur that can breathe fire. Super will drive his red Super Dave sports car around the arena, and Fuji will operate Robosaurus, trying to catch him. Fuji demonstrates the robot's fire breathing, and he accidentally burns through the scoreboard monitor's support wire, which Super is unfortunately caught under. Back in the studio, Celine Dion sings "Any Other Way". The badly injured Super is put in an ambulance. The Super One gets hurt: "Don't do anything else!" Fuji has the robot pick the ambulance up and chew it to bits. The Last Word: "Well, not a total loss. At least now you finally know who killed Laura Palmer."
78	19	"Museum of Modern Art"	Jim Riswold, Donald Glanz, Bernie Weinthal, Ron Fawcett, Fuji Hakayito	The Super Dave "Super Cruiser" (actually a scooter).	Red and purple plaid jacket, red tie, white hanky, white shirt and pants. Later, pink jacket, pink, white and blue striped tie, white hanky, white shirt and pants.	Unknown
At the Super Dave Antique Car Auction, Donald has helped Super set up the space for some of Ron Fawcett's prize automobiles. Ron Fawcett himself shows up as his most valuable car, an 1898 Panhard, is unloaded from the bus cargo area, along with Bernie in his own tiny car. Super and Jim Roswold show a couple of commercials for Nike featuring Super Dave. Super also awards Jim with a Super Dave Hall of Fame plaque. Super and Fuji give a tour of the new Super Dave Museum of Modern Art, showing off several pieces ending with the "Piano Vault", which is a player piano with a secret safe hidden somewhere that opens when you play a specific song. The Super One gets hurt: "This is not only spectacular, but it's fun!" The safe door is actually under the bench, which Super is sitting on. He gets thrown through the window. The Last Word: He reluctantly tells a joke about Dan Quayle.
79	20	"Chroma-Key"	Recollection Contest, Donald Glanz, Fuji Hakayito	The Super Dave white quad.	Pale yellow jacket, red and white striped tie, red hanky, white shirt and pants, white shoes.	Unknown
Super holds the Super Dave recollection contest, where audience members get a chance to win shirts and hats by watching video clips of previous stunts and answering detail questions. One of the contestants has to perform a balancing act. A man from the audience, Eddie Rice, tells a joke about a prize cat before sending it to Mike Walden. Donald and Super hold a class in filmmaking, where they show how chroma-works with a blue screen, by using equipment in their special trailer to do overlays. Super will do his demonstration by diving from a scaffold into a chroma-key blue bag which is overlaid with a film of water to make it look like he is diving into a pool. The Super One gets hurt: "It's a Super Dave swan dive! Into the bag!... into the truck!" He misses the bag and winds up in the trailer. Due to his injuries, his face turns a perfect chroma-key blue. Super Dave! Super Dave! Are you all right?: "Oh yeah, putz. I'm perfect. Get me a doctor." The Last Word: "Uh oh. I really am losing oxygen."
80	21	"Car Phone Warning System"	Randy Travis, Fuji Hakayito	The Super Dave white jeep.	Pale purple jacket, purple tie with white polka dots, purple hanky, white shirt and pants	Unknown
Michel Lauziere plays Ode to Joy on wine glasses, then changes his pants in ten seconds. Randy Travis sings "It's Just a Matter of Time". At the Super Dave Test Track, Super and Fuji explain their work with the North American Highway Patrol Association and we see a flashback of the "Bump and Rob". Super is going to drive the test vehicle around the track, and Fuji is going to call him on the car phone to warn him about upcoming hazards. Super safely avoids broken glass and a stray cow, and is warned in advance that there's a rain storm. The Super One gets hurt: "I'll call you back." Fuji warns him too late that the track ends, and he goes plummeting to the ground. The Last Word: Groaning in pain.
81	22	"Soccer Stadium"	The Smothers Brothers, Fuji Hakayito	The Super Dave convertible Wonder Cycle.	Red jacket, red, white, grey and black striped tie, black, white and red plaid pyjama pants, white hanky and shirt	Unknown
The Smothers Brothers open the show with Tom explaining about how one brother usually gets confused with the other, then sing a lively tune about Super Dave. Tom Smothers then becomes the "Yo-Yo Man" and dazzles the audience with his tricks. Fuji and Super give a tour of the new Super Dave Safe Soccer Stadium, which has measures in place to prevent fights between players and spectators, and to ensure the referee's safety. The biggest feature is the ejection seats people can use to escape if a riot erupts. Super intends to simulate a riot by having rows of seats filled with cardboard cutout people move closer to him until he decides to eject. The Super One gets hurt: Fuji brings the rows of seats together too fast, and he gets crushed between them. The Last Word: He pleads with Fuji and Mike to get him out of the stands.
82	23	"Flight Training School"	Jeff Dunham, Sue Medley, Fuji Hakayito	The Super Dave white quad.	Red jacket, red, white and blue striped tie, white shirt with black stripes, white hanky, white pants and shoes.	Unknown
Sue Medley sings "Love Thing". Jeff Dunham performs with Peanut the Woozle, Jose the jalepeno on a stick, and Peanut's own Little Jeff dummy. At the new Super Dave Flight Training School, Super and Fuji explain how people can visit and watch planes fly, get plane rides, or even flight lessons. The planes that people ride in are actually controlled by Fuji in a special control unit on the ground. Super goes up in one of the planes and flies over the whole compound, and even chases another plane simulating an air combat, and makes a perfect landing. The school also offers the "Ultimate Flying Experience" at the highest price. Mike wants to know what it is, and Fuji explains that it simulates the plane actually getting hit by gunfire. The Super One gets hurt: "On the ground? Well, how will I know if I'm hit?" Fuji demonstrates by blowing up the plane, with Super unfortunately still inside. Super Dave! Super Dave! Are you all right?: "Yeah, I'm a marshmallow, putz. I need help." The Last Word: A poem called "My Last Flight": "I flew like the wind as never before, / I soared as the eagle with clouds at my door. / My senses were singing my worries were nil, / I knew if I landed I might lose the thrill. / But duty does call so down I did drop, / I shed a few tears as I knew I must stop. / Back on the ground blue is my mood, / A messy charred mass, I'm airline food!"
83	24	"Earthquake Safety House"	KD Lang, Donald Glanz	The Super Dave white jeep.	Yellow, green, black and white plaid square pattern jacket, black tie, white hanky and shirt, white pants and shoes.	Unknown
Dan Menendez comes back and does a juggling act, and briefly tries a ventriloquism act. KD Lang sings "Trail of Broken Hearts". Super and Donald give a tour of their new Earthquake Safety House, which protects occupants from the effects of an earthquake. Inside the house, there is a padded floor and walls, furniture made from food in case of emergency, a Super Dave survival guide, a phone with an airbag in it, and finally a chair loaded with springs that will not move around if there's an earthquake. He demonstrates this by having Donald and the crew shake the house. Super wants to simulate a bigger earthquake, but the crew isn't strong enough. The Super One gets hurt: "An 8... and now it feels like a 9 to me... I think we have a 10!" Donald has a bulldozer push the house over a cliff. The Last Word: He loudly berates Mike's wardrobe.
84	25	"Best of Super Dave 3"	The Best of Super Dave, Tony Cox, Fuji Hakayito	-	(Mike is only seen in flashbacks)	Unknown
Time once again for the Best of Super Dave! As per requests from audience members, we see the Bungee School and Little Red Riding Hood at Storybookland. Tony Cox, the president of the network, is up in the box, and it also happens to be his birthday. He requests the Fast Food Restaurant. In an effort to gain favour with Tony, Super drives him back to the airport on his bicycle cart, along with all of his luggage. The Super One (doesn't) get hurt: Just his dignity is from having to kiss up to Tony like this. The Last Word: He exchanges sarcastic conversation with Tony.

== Season 5 (1991) ==
No. overall	No. in season	Title	Billboard Guest Stars	Arrival vehicle	Mike Walden's outfit	Original release date
85	1	"Senior Citizens' Theatre"	Glen Campbell, Donald Glanz	The Super Dave black motorbike and sidecar.	Pale Peach jacket, red tie, white hanky and shirt, white pants and shoes.	Unknown
Glen Campbell sings "On a Good Night". Super and Donald give a tour of the new Super Dave Senior Citizens' Theatre, which has features specifically built for senior citizens and their needs. The movie playing is Super's "Garbane" fuel demonstration. Super find out the building was renovated, and he wonders what the building used to be. Donald tells him it used to be a senior citizens' parking lot. The Super One gets hurt: "Of course…" Gladys, a senior lady, still thinks it's a parking lot, and drives through the screen flattening him. The Last Word: He pleads with everyone for help.
86	2	"Mr. Osborne's Neighbourhood"	Michelle Wright, Donald Glanz	The Super Dave red buggy.	Dark green jacket, white tie with black stripes, white hanky and shirt, white pants and shoes.	Unknown
Rodney McCray from the Chicago White Sox is inducted into the Super Dave Hall of Fame, and George Brett and Rocket Ismail are also present for the occasion. Michelle Wright sings "All You Really Wanna Do". Donald and Super introduce the Children's TV Hall of Fame area of the compound, and perform "Mr. Osborne's neighbourhood" (A spoof of Mr. Rogers' Neighbourhood) with Super as Mr. Osborne, and Donald as Mr. Conductor, learning about trains. Mr. Osborne visits "Train Land" and also learns not to put his hand on the miniature train tracks, while Mr. Conductor gets locked in the closet. Mr. Osborne tells us an un-child friendly story about a duck named Wilbur. The Super One gets hurt: "Now, what I want you to do for Mr. Osborne is I want you to shut your eyes and I want you to wish for something as hard as you can. And I'm sure it will come true for Mr. Osborne. Are you wishing?…" Mr. Osborne certainly didn't wish for a train to crash through the house and run him down! The Last Word: (He's too far away. We can't hear him.)
87	3	"Country Western Days"	Colin James, Bernie Weinthal, Fuji Hakayito	Super Dave's horse, Dynamite.	Dark green jacket, white tie with black stripes, white hanky and shirt, white pants and shoes.	Unknown
Super shows his new golf video, featuring Fuji, showing Super's golf tips. Peter Longo, the head of the heavy equipment area of the compound, tries to hit a golf ball off Super's mouth, with unfortunate results. Colin James plays "Just Came Back". Super and Fuji give a tour of the Country Western area, where families can come and have a real Wild West experience. Tommy Arbor performs trick riding, and we see Bernie in the general store. Stunt fist fights and gun fights also happen from time to time to entertain the crowd. Super has a shootout with Jimbo North, and he gets shot and flies backwards through a window. He seems to be okay, though, and he explains how the stunt worked using a cable attached to his back and pulled by a car, as well as breakaway glass and mats. The Super One gets hurt: Turns out it was not breakaway glass after all. Super needs medical attention, and Fuji calls for the car to take him to the hospital. "I'm still attached!" He fails to realize Super is still tied to the car, and it drags him away. The Last Word: He screams in pain as he is dragged off.
88	4	"Home Alone House"	An SD Poem, Fuji Hakayito	The Super Dave black quad.	Red jacket, white, black and yellow striped tie, white hanky and shirt, white pants and shoes.	Unknown
Super tries to open the show with a poem he wrote, but he is interrupted once again by Michel Lauziere trying to impress Super with various tricks. Super Dave shows blooper footage of a girl from the audience who had to do many takes to throw it to Mike Walden. Super and Fuji introduce the new "Home Alone" house based on the hit movie. They have a game where Super plays Kevin, and Fuji and Mike play the robbers. Super stays in the house that's filled with fun traps, and Fuji and Mike will arm themselves with toys from the truck. Every prank Super plays that successfully hits the opponent earns points, and Fuji and Mike score points the further they get in the house. The Super One gets hurt: "Oh, I can't believe it. They're so lazy, they're driving up!" Fuji decides to get them in by driving the truck through the front door, and it flattens him. The Last Word: One feeble cry for help.
89	5	"Star Car"	Crystal Gayle, Dr Vargas, the Jeff Healey band, Fuji Hakayito	A red pickup.	Pink jacket, deep purple tie, white hanky and shirt, white pants and shoes.	Unknown
At the Super Dave International Raceway, Super and Fuji introduce a special race where each car is sponsored by a male celebrity, but driven by a female celebrity. Super demonstrates driving the white pace car, which unfortunately blows up when he starts it. Crystal Gayle sings "Same Old Story". In the hospital, Dr Vargas is in the process of X-raying Super, which turns disastrous when he gets distracted by Mike. The Jeff Healey Band sings "Full Circle". Dr Vargas has given Super a clean bill of health, despite him having to relocate a lot of bones, and he is recovering in a hospital room which also sponsored by the celebrities. To make him feel better, Mike shows a flashback of the Super Dave cola car. The Super One gets hurt: Fuji activates the remote control which controls the bed, and the bed throws him out the window. The Last Word: He screams as Fuji messes with the hospital bed.
90	6	"Casino Circus"	Donald Glanz, Fuji Hakayito	-	Black and grey block pattern jacket, red bow tie and cummerbund, red hanky, white shirt, white pants and shoes.	Unknown
Super and Donald open up the new Casino Circus, featuring games where you can win credit at the general store. One of the games is "Stunt Wheel", where you bet on specific stunts to come up on the wheel, and you need to answer a trivia question to win. The demonstration gives us a flashback of the "Atomic Yo-yo" stunt. They also demonstrate the slot machine, which gives a flashback of the "Outdoor Lip Synching Area". Super continues on to "Shoot for the Stars", where you shoot a basket to win money. The tour ends with the "Matilda" game where you sit on one end of a seesaw, and a 4000 pound dummy of a woman falls on the other end and you get launched up and grab a money bag. The dummy moves around, and you have to make it drop at the right moment. The Super One gets hurt: "...Drop?" The dummy lands right on Super, and he becomes the Head on Shoes. Donald shoots him in the basket and wins a million dollars. Super Dave! Super Dave! Are you all right?: "Yeah, putz, I'm perfect. Why wouldn't I be all right? I'm a head on shoes. The tongue in my tennis shoes replaced the tongue in my mouth. I'm fine. Why don't we go bowling?" The Last Word: He asks Donald to buy him a tombstone with an inscription: "Roses are red, / Violets are blue, / He's the only human being / to have died in his shoe."
91	7	"Health Expo"	Celine Dion, Dr Gerry Bennett, Donald Glanz	The Super Pago Jet, making a rather undignified landing.	Yellow jacket, red tie with grey stripes, white hanky and shirt, white pants and shoes.	Unknown
Celine Dion sings "Where Does My Heart Beat Now". Donald and Super open the new Super Dave health expo, and Steven Kolodny shows his latest video compilation. The tour shows exhibits about staying healthy, including weight training, choosing the right shoes, and eating organic food. Dr Gerry Bennett the Heimlich expert helps Super demonstrate the Heimlich maneuver, and Super demonstrates Dr. Bennett's special Heimlich vest with arms that automatically detects when you're choking and performs the Heimlich on the wearer. The Super One gets hurt: "All right... let me show you what happens if I choke." The vest is a little too powerful. First it slams him through the table top, then sends him flying through the window. Super Dave! Super Dave! Are you all right?: "Oh yeah, I'm perfect, putz. I've got nearly four pounds of glass in my ear, and two rubber fists holding my kidneys." The Last Word: "You know, Mike, when I get out of here, I'm going to squeeze your sternum so hard that your tongue's going to pop out and cover that fat face of yours."
92	8	"Senior Citizens' Amusement Park"	Jeff Dunham, Fuji Hakayito	The Super Dave black go-kart.	Pink, white and purple plaid jacket, white tie and hanky, white shirt and shoes, pale purple pants	Unknown
Super Dave participated in a contest where you make your own commercial, and he shows a commercial he made for Bugle Boy Jeans. Jeff Dunham performs with Peanut the Woozle. Fuji and Super give a tour of the new Senior Citizens' Amusement Park, which is an amusement park entirely staffed by seniors. He rounds off the tour with the Super Dave Haunted House Ride, which has "Monster Mash" by Bobby Pickett and the Crypt Kickers playing. The Super One gets hurt: "Okay, then I'll just go through the door and stop... no I won't!" Turns out the ride is unfinished, and the track ends at a cliffside. He and the car plummet to the ground. Super Dave! Super Dave! Are you all right?: "Oh yeah, putz, I'm perfect. I just flipped 11 times off a mountain and fell 400 feet and landed on rocks in a toy car. I've never felt better in my life. Is there anything else you can say other than "Are you all right'?'" The Last Word: "Help."
93	9	"Ace Award Hall of Fame"	Ace Award Tribute, Candi and the Backbeat, Fuji Hakayito	The Super Dave camera car.	Grey and black paisley pattern jacket, red tie, white hanky and shirt, white pants and shoes.	Unknown
Candi and the Backbeat sing "The World Keeps on Turning". At the new Super Dave Ace Award Hall of Fame, Super has won his own Ace Award Ceremony after waiting so long for it. Fuji and Super give a tour of Super Dave memory lane. We see caricatures of guest stars, Super's outfits, and Super Dave memorabilia. You can even watch video clips of his stunts and check out the actual Ace Award ceremony. Super then dedicates the whole building by signing his name in wet cement in the middle of the building, which will then be sealed up. The Super One gets hurt: "Oh, when are you going to do that?" Fuji decides to seal up the wet cement by dropping flooring on it. Super happens to be under it at the time. The Last Word: "Oh, look at this. I just found a pair of Jimmy Hoffa's cufflinks."
94	10	"Super's Guinness Book of World Records Stunt"	Clarence Clemons, Fuji Hakayito	The Super Dave white supersonic boat.	Pink jacket, blue and grey striped tie, white hanky and shirt, white pants and shoes.	Unknown
Super tries to hold a contest where viewers guess how many bulbs are in the "SD" shown on the billboard, but he is once again interrupted by Michel Lauziere trying to impress the audience with his tricks. On the Super Dave Super Barge SS Super, Fuji helps Super to perform his big stunt to get into the Guinness book of records, where Super will be put in a straitjacket, locked in a safe, put underwater, and will solve a Rubik's cube in two minutes. As an added precaution, explosive charges and communications have been rigged into the safe in case of emergency. Back in the studio, Clarence Clemons performs with his band. The Super One gets hurt: "All right, but this better work. I'm losing air. I'm pushing it." Super is unable to get the straitjacket off, so he sets off the charges on the door. The door doesn't open, however. He sets off the other one, and it blows him right through the bottom of the safe. Fuji tries to help by setting off charges in his shoes, and he gets blown into the air. Super Dave! Super Dave! Are you all right?: "Oh yeah, putz, I'm just perfect. I just experienced a 40 minute wash and spin cycle in two seconds. I'm a human torpedo. Do I look all right?" The Last Word: Hopelessly pleading for help.
95	11	"Ultimate Safety Vehicle"	Place the Face Contest, Fuji Hakayito	The Super Dave white golf cart, then later the Super Dave black pickup.	Blue jacket, white and blue striped tie, white hanky and shirt, white pants and shoes. Later: Yellow jacket, red tie with grey stripes, red hanky, white shirt, white pants and shoes.	Unknown
At the Super Dave Rolling Green Acres Memorial Golf Course, the 18th hole has just been finished. As Super plays the hole, Fuji then reveals what the land the final hole is on used to be. In the studio, Super brings a young man, Tony Ford, up on stage for his "Place the Face Contest", where he has to identify photos of celebrities, then play Jerry Lee Lewis's "Whole Lotta Shakin' Goin' On" on the piano. At the Super Dave test track, Fuji helps Super demonstrate the "Ultimate Safety Vehicle". A semi goes through and mows the vehicle down, and Super analyses the collision on his computer to see how much impact each part got in order to improve the safety features. He intends to send the truck through again, but he reads a glitch in the system, and orders the truck not to hit the car. The Super One gets hurt: The truck mows him down instead. The Last Word: (He's too far away. We can't hear him.)
96	12	"Car Show of the Future"	Billy Vera, Fuji Hakayito	The Super Dave red "Electro Car".	Blue jacket, white shirt with black stripes, white and blue striped tie, white hanky, white pants and shoes. Later: Same outfit, but with red, white and blue striped tie.	Unknown
Fuji and Super open up the new "Super Dave Autograph Pavilion" by having Super sign autographs for little children and asking them their favourite stunt. Super then gives a heartfelt speech about not charging for autographs. Billy Vera sings "At This Moment". At the Super Dave Car Show of the future, Super shows off several cars powered by alternative energy sources, as well as some fancy bicycles. Fuji demonstrates his own invention, the "Friend", which is a car that responds to the owner's requests by tapping a secret code on the surface of the vehicle. The Super One gets hurt: "It's not working." He tries to open the hood, and the car doesn't respond. Fuji tells him to try harder, and the hood flies open and whacks him in the head. He then gets suffocated by the air bag, then nailed again by Fuji opening the trunk. Mike then accidentally slaps the car, resulting in the car starting up and driving through the wall. Super Dave! Super Dave! Are you all right?: "Oh yeah, putz, I'm perfect. Why don't you stick your thumb in your mouth and blow hard enough to explode that fat little face of yours?" The Last Word: Pleading for them to get him out of the car.
97	13	"Best of Super Dave 4"	The Best of Super Dave, Donald Glanz, Fuji Hakayito	-	(Mike is only seen in flashbacks)	Unknown
Time once again for the best of Super Dave! As per audience requests, we see the "Star Car", the Super Dave Golf video, the blooper tape of the girl throwing it to Mike Walden, the Senior's amusement park's haunted house, and the Home Alone house. Tony Cox is unable to attend the show, but he sends in his request, for Country and Western days. The Super One (doesn't) get hurt: Tony also informs Super he will be getting only 6 shows next year because of the recession. So just his pride is hurt again. Super decides to show the Steven Kolodny video instead. The Last Word: "Let's finish with the Steve Kolodny video!!!"
