= Super Dave =

Super Dave may refer to:

- Super Dave Osborne, a fictional stuntman played by Bob Einstein
- Super Dave (TV series), a variety show starring Osborne
- Super Dave: Daredevil for Hire, an animated television series starring Osborne
