= The Extreme Adventures of Super Dave =

- DVD cover
- Directed by: Peter MacDonald
- Screenplay by: Bob Einstein; Lorne Cameron; David Hoselton
- Story by: Bob Einstein; Don Lake
- Based on: Characters by Bob Einstein; Allan Blye
- Produced by: Larry Brezner; Mike Marcus; David Steinberg
- Starring: Bob Einstein; Dan Hedaya; Gia Carides; Steve Van Wormer
- Cinematography: Bernd Heinl
- Edited by: Mike Murphy
- Music by: Andrew Gross
- Production companies: Metro-Goldwyn-Mayer; Morra, Brezner, Steinberg and Tenenbaum Entertainment; Blye-Einstein Productions
- Distributed by: MGM Home Entertainment
- Release date: January 11, 2000
- Running time: 90 minutes
- Language: English
- Budget: $15 million

The Extreme Adventures of Super Dave is a 2000 American comedy film directed by Peter MacDonald and starring the comedian Bob Einstein as Super Dave Osborne. The film was released directly to video by MGM Home Entertainment on January 11, 2000 and was awarded at the 2000 Stinkers Bad Movie Awards for Most Unwelcome Direct-to-Video Release.

== Plot ==
After the kind-hearted but clumsy Super Dave Osborne survives a near-fatal accident, he discovers his manager Murray Schneiderman has embezzled from him. This forces him into bankruptcy and causes him to lose his house. Super Dave decides to retire from stunt work, but ends up meeting a single mother named Sandy. When Super Dave learns that Sandy's son, Timmy needs an expensive heart surgery, Super Dave comes out of retirement to raise the money. In the process, he must face off against his arch-enemy, Gil Ruston.

== Cast ==
- Bob Einstein as Super Dave Osborne
  - Michael Angarano as Young Dave Osborne
- Dan Hedaya as Gil Ruston
- Gia Carides as Sandy
- Don Lake as Donald Glanz
- Art Irizawa as Fuji Hakayito
  - Casey Deguchi as Young Fuji Hakayito
- Brett Miller as Randy
- Mike Walden as Himself
- Carl Michael Lindner as Timmy
- Steve Van Wormer as DJ
- Ray Charles as Himself
- Michael Buffer as Himself
- Evander Holyfield as Himself
- John Elway as Himself
- David Barco as Himself
- Daniel Raymont as Hairdresser
- Pamela Paulshock as Manicurist
- Judith Hoag as Fan
- Jim Doughan as Dave's Doctor
- Butch McCain as Reporter
- Meadow Williams as Driver
- Matthew Laurance as Timmy's Doctor
- Jim McMullan as Surgeon
- Mike Connors as Grandpa Danny Osborne (uncredited)
- Billy Barty as Eulogist (uncredited)

== Release ==
The film was released direct to DVD and VHS and has been shown on Sky Movies and Charge!. It was released on Blu-ray on September 13, 2022 by Kino Lorber.
