= Allan Blye =

Canadian-born American television writer (1937–2024)

- Born: July 19, 1937; Winnipeg, Manitoba, Canada
- Died: October 4, 2024 (aged 87); Palm Desert, California, U.S.
- Occupation: Television writer

Allan Blye (July 19, 1937 – October 4, 2024) was a Canadian-born American television writer known as a writer for The Smothers Brothers Comedy Hour and The Sonny & Cher Comedy Hour. He played Captain Blye on Mister Rogers' Neighborhood in the 1960s. Blye died in Palm Desert, California, on October 4, 2024, at the age of 87.

== Filmography ==
Year	Title	Writer	Producer	Actor	Notes
1962	Playdate	No	No	Yes	Season 2 Episode 7
1963	The Forest Rangers	No	No	Yes	Season 1 Episode 7
1963–1966	The Juliette Show	Yes	No	No	
1964–1967	Mister Rogers' Neighborhood	No	No	Yes	9 Episodes as Captain Blye
1965	Theatre 625	No	No	Yes	Season 3 Episode 2
1966	Juliette	Yes	No	No	Episode 7
1966	Festival	No	No	Yes	1 Episode as “Alan Blye”
1967–1993	The Smothers Brothers Comedy Hour	Yes	Yes	No	73 Episodes as writer 27 Episodes as producer
1968	Petula	Yes	No	No	Television Special
1968	Andy Williams’ Kaleidoscope Company	Yes	No	No	Television Special
1968	The Summer Brothers Smothers Show	Yes	Yes	No	5 Episodes
1968	Pat Paulsen for President	Yes	Yes	No	Television Movie
1968	Elvis: 68 Comeback Special	Yes	No	No	Television Special
1968	The Andy Williams Christmas Special	Yes	No	No	Television Special
1969	The Andy Williams Magic Lantern Show Company	Yes	Yes	No	Television Special
1969–1971	The Andy Williams Show	Yes	Yes	Yes	50 Episodes as writer 50 Episodes as producer 44 Episodes as actor
1970	The Return of the Smothers Brothers	Yes	No	No	Television Movie
1970	Pat Paulsen's Half a Comedy Hour	Yes	No	Yes	13 Episodes as writer 1 Episode as actor
1970	The Ray Stevens Show	Yes	Yes	No	7 Episodes
1971	Li’l Abner	Yes	Yes	No	Television Movie
1971	The Andy Williams Christmas Show	Yes	Yes	No	Television Special
1971–1974	The Sonny & Cher Comedy Hour	Yes	Yes	Yes	67 Episodes as writer 67 Episodes as producer 1 Episode as actor
1972	The Ken Barry ‘Wow’ Show	Yes	Yes	No	6 Episodes
1974	Hamburgers	Yes	Yes	No	Television Movie
1974	The Hudson Brothers Razzle Dazzle Show	Yes	Yes	No	16 Episodes
1974	The Sonny Comedy Revue	Yes	Yes	No	12 Episodes
1974–1975	That's My Mama	No	Yes	No	39 Episodes
1975	Joey & Dad	Yes	Yes	No	4 Episodes
1975	Van Dyke and Company	Yes	Yes	No	Television Special
1975–1976	Lola!	Yes	Yes	No	4 Episodes
1975–1977	The Bobby Vinton Show	Yes	Yes	No	61 Episodes
1976	Van Dyke and Company	Yes	Yes	No	11 Episodes
1976	The Sonny and Cher Show	No	Yes	No	
1977	Redd Foxx	Yes	Yes	No	2 Episodes as writer 3 Episodes as producer
1978	The Redd Foxx Special	Yes	Yes	No	Television Special
1979–1986	Bizarre	Yes	Yes	No	58 Episodes
1985	Elvis: One Night with You	Yes	No	No	Uncredited
1987–1999	Super Dave	Yes	Yes	No	99 Episodes as writer 100 Episodes as producer
1992	The 44th Primetime Emmy Awards	Yes	No	No	Television Special
1992	Comic Relief V	Yes	No	No	Television Special
1992	Super Dave: Daredevil for Hire	Yes	Yes	No	13 Episodes
1994	The Super Dave Super Bowl of Knowledge	Yes	Yes	No	Television Movie
1995	Super Dave's Vegas Spectacular	No	Yes	No	2 Episodes
1997–1998	Super Dave's All Stars	Yes	Yes	No	4 Episodes as writer 5 Episodes as producer
2000	The Extreme Adventures of Super Dave	Yes	Yes	No	
2009	Super Dave's Spike Tacular	Yes	Yes	No	4 Episodes
