= Tuned bottles =

Musical instrument made from bottles filled with water

Tuned Bottles
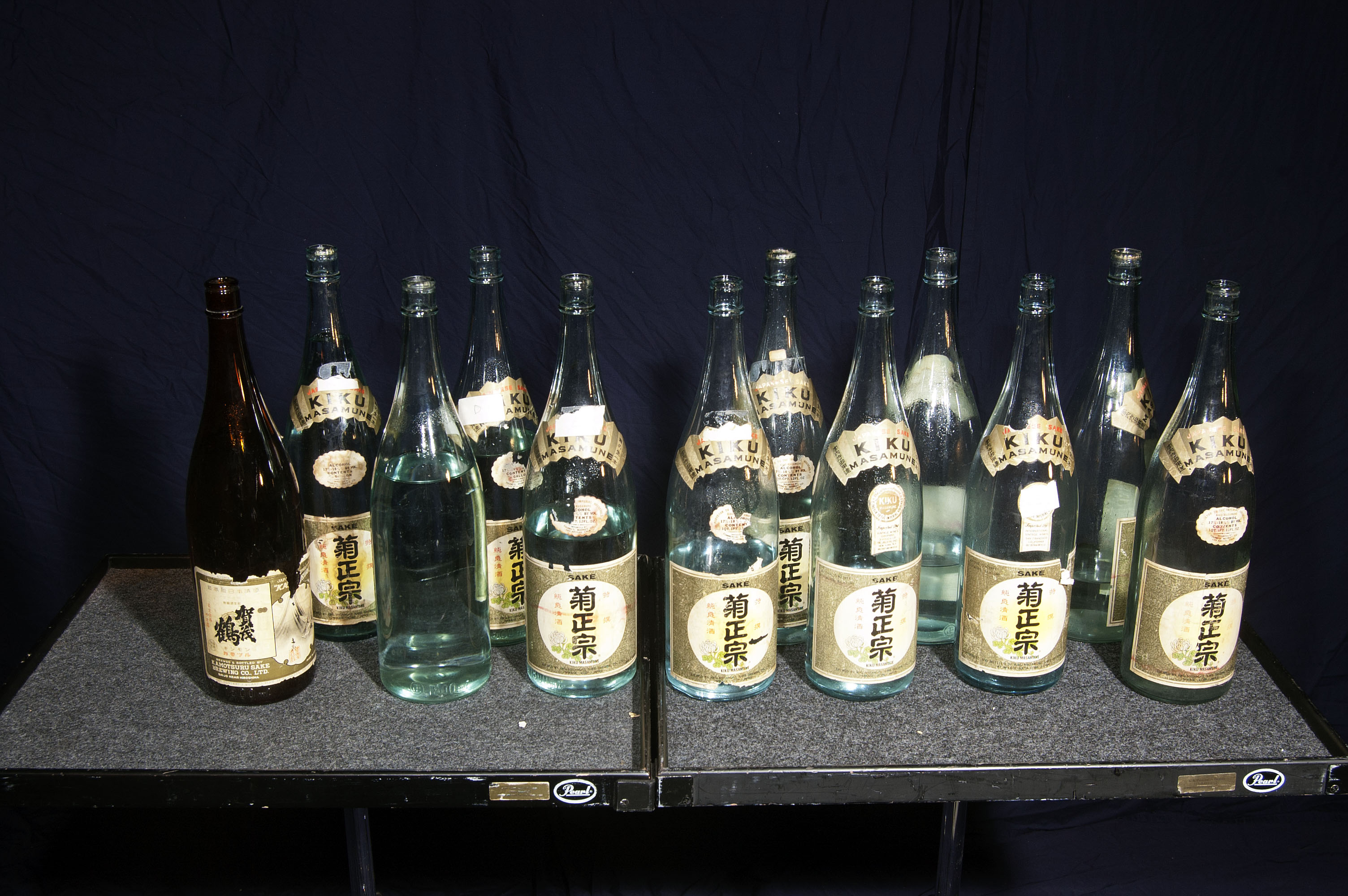
- Tuned Bottles (from the Emil Richards Collection)
- Other names: Pitched Bottles
- Classification: Percussion instrument (Idiophone)

Playing range
- varies (depending on bottles, about one octave near C7 - C8)

Related instruments
- musical glasses, glass harp

Tuned Bottles are musical instruments crafted from everyday bottles (found objects) which are filled with water to create different pitches. The length of the air column above the water determines the resonant frequency, and thus the pitch achieved. Tuned bottles may be struck (placing them in the percussion family), or blown (placing them in the wind instrument family, similar to pan-pipes). In the latter case, they are often known as blown bottles.

The instrument has the potential range of at least one octave, and can easily be tuned to any chromatic pitch, so it is possible to perform complex melodies with it. Typical struck bottles sound from about C7 to C8. Of course, music can be transposed into this range as needed. The pitch, dynamic range, and timbre depend on the bottles used, for example their material, shape, thickness, and so on.

In practice, multiple bottles are typically used, one for each desired pitch. This is similar to many other instruments which use a separate mechanism for each pitch (piano, xylophone, harp, harmonica, bells, etc.).

Among many examples, (Michel Lauzière has performed Symphony No. 40). The instrument also has been seen in Eurovision Song Contest 2008, Croatian entry "Romanca" by Kraljevi ulice. In this performance bottles are seen hanging on threads in front of the player; this may improve the sound or add convenience.

Tuned bottles were used by percussion legend Emil Richards in numerous performances and recordings and are part of his large instrument collection.

== See also ==
- Blown bottle
- Glass harp
- List of bottle types, brands and companies
