= Bob Einstein =

American actor and comedy writer (1942–2019)

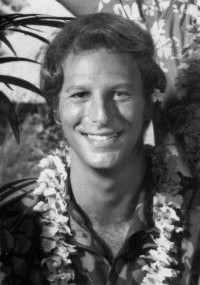
- Einstein in the unsold television pilot Three for Tahiti, 1970
- Born: November 20, 1942; Los Angeles, California, U.S.
- Died: January 2, 2019 (aged 76); Indian Wells, California, U.S.
- Education: Chapman University
- Occupations: Actor, comedy writer, producer
- Years active: 1967–2017
- Spouse: Roberta Einstein
- Parent(s): Harry Einstein; Thelma Leeds
- Relatives: Albert Brooks (brother); Charles Einstein (half-brother)
- Website: bobeinstein.com

Stewart Robert Einstein (November 20, 1942 – January 2, 2019) was an American actor, comedy writer, and producer. He created and performed the satirical stuntman character Super Dave Osborne, and was also known for his roles as Marty Funkhouser in Curb Your Enthusiasm and Larry Middleman on Arrested Development.

Einstein got his start on several television variety shows, including The Smothers Brothers Comedy Hour and The Sonny & Cher Comedy Hour. Einstein won two Emmy Awards as a writer and was nominated four other times. He also won a CableACE Award for acting as Super Dave, along with five other nominations.

Einstein was the son of radio comedian Harry Einstein, and the older brother of fellow actor and comedian Albert Brooks.

== Background ==
Einstein was born in 1942 in Los Angeles, to Jewish parents. His parents were the comic Harry Einstein, best known for playing the character Parkyakarkus on radio and in the movies, and the actress-singer Thelma Leeds. On October 24, 1949, at the age of six, it was reported in the Los Angeles Times that he had contracted polio. His younger brother is comedian and writer Albert Brooks (born Albert Lawrence Einstein). He was a Beverly Hills High School graduate and a 1965 graduate of Chapman College.

== Career ==
Einstein got his start writing for The Smothers Brothers Comedy Hour, for which he won an Emmy Award. The writing team also included Steve Martin and Murray Roman. He also appeared on the show as Officer Judy, a uniformed police officer who gave Liberace a speeding ticket for playing his piano too fast. In 1977 he won an Emmy for outstanding comedy-variety series for his work on Van Dyke and Company.

=== Super Dave Osborne ===
Einstein created the goofy stuntman Super Dave Osborne character for the John Byner Comedy Hour. The character later became a regular on the 1980 television series Bizarre, also hosted by Byner, and was a frequent guest on Late Night with David Letterman where he would show clips of his ill-fated stunts and tell long semi-crude jokes. In 1987, Einstein got his own variety show titled Super Dave, which ran until 1991 on the Global Television Network in Canada (where the show was produced at the network's Toronto studio) and Showtime in the United States. In 1992, an animated series Super Dave: Daredevil for Hire aired on Fox. Einstein later starred in the 2000 movie The Extreme Adventures of Super Dave.

On November 12, 2009, the airing of TNA Impact!, he was the booker and host of the night. He made Super Dave's Spike Tacular, a four-episode sketch series on Spike TV reprising his Super Dave character, once again engaging in outrageous stunts.

=== Other roles ===
Einstein had recurring roles as Marty Funkhouser in Curb Your Enthusiasm and Larry Middleman in the third season of Arrested Development. He was also featured on the Comedy Central show Crank Yankers as obnoxious district selectman Tony Deloge. Einstein was also on The Man Show where he did Century Club with Adam and Jimmy. In Ocean's Thirteen he played Linus Caldwell (Matt Damon)'s father, Robert "Bobby" Caldwell, a master robber and con artist whose day job is an FBI agent.

Einstein appeared on the second season of Anger Management as Charlie Goodson's very angry neighbor, and his character in the show instantly got an unflattering nickname based on a feminine hygiene product.

Einstein voiced two characters from The Life & Times of Tim, playing the Elephant Trainer in Tim & the Elephant in the second season, and the bookie in Pray for the Jets in the third.

Einstein was the first comedian to appear twice on Jerry Seinfeld's Web series Comedians in Cars Getting Coffee.

In the 2010s, Einstein was a frequent guest on the sports talk radio program The Dan Le Batard Show with Stugotz. Einstein called in as a "Celebrity Prognosticator" to give his thoughts on sports and various other topics.

== Death ==
Einstein died on January 2, 2019, at the age of 76, shortly after being diagnosed with cancer.

Curb Your Enthusiasm series creator and star Larry David said in a statement: "Never have I seen an actor enjoy a role the way Bob did playing 'Marty Funkhouser' on Curb. It was an amazing, unforgettable experience knowing and working with him. There was no one like him, as he told us again and again. We're all in a state of shock." Jerry Seinfeld paid tribute to Einstein on Twitter.

A documentary about his life, The Super Bob Einstein Movie, was released on 28th December 2021 on HBO.

== Filmography ==
=== Film ===
Year	Title	Role	Notes
1972	Get to Know Your Rabbit	Police Officer	
1972	Another Nice Mess	Agent Nussbaum	
1981	Modern Romance	Sporting Goods Salesman	
2000	The Extreme Adventures of Super Dave	Super Dave Osborne	
2002	Teddy Bears' Picnic	Dom Molinari	
2007	Ocean's Thirteen	Robert "Bobby" Caldwell	
2010	Shit Year	Rick	
2015	Strange Magic	Stuff	Voice

=== Television ===
As Super Dave

Year	Title	Notes
1972	The John Byner Comedy Hour	First appearance as Super Dave
1976	Van Dyke and Company	Episode #1.6
1977	The Redd Foxx Comedy Hour	Producer
1980–1985	Bizarre	1981-1985
1980	Late Night with David Letterman	Recurring guest
1989	The Tonight Show Starring Johnny Carson	Episode: "Super Dave/Park Overall/Mark Schiff"
1987–1991	Super Dave	Also writer
1992	Super Dave: Daredevil for Hire	Also writer
1993	In Living Color	
1994–1995	WWE Monday Night RAW	Television Special
1995	Super Dave's Vegas Spectacular	Television Special
1997	Super Dave's All Stars	Television Special
1998–2004	Hollywood Squares	Recurring guest
2003	The Man Show	Episode: "Jimmy Asks Women 'What Do You Weigh?'"
2009	Super Dave's Spike-Tacular	Episode: "Mr. Big Meeting"
2009	The Tonight Show with Conan O'Brien	November 11, 2009
2009	TNA Impact!	

Other roles

Year	Title	Role	Notes
1967–1969	The Smothers Brothers Comedy Hour	Officer Judy	9 episodes
1970	Pat Paulsen's Half a Comedy Hour	Various Roles	8 episodes
1971	The Steve Allen Show	Himself	August 31, 1971
1971	Tom Smothers' Organic Prime Time Space Ride	Himself	5 episodes
1971–1991	The Tonight Show with Johnny Carson	Himself - Guest	10 episodes
1973	The Sonny & Cher Comedy Hour	Himself	Episode #4.1
1975	The Smothers Brothers Show	Himself	4 episodes
1988–1991	Late Night with David Letterman	Himself	9 episodes
1993–1995	Late Show with David Letterman	Himself	5 episodes
1997	Roseanne	Howard Morton	Episode: "The Truth Be Told"
1999	The Norm Show	Al	Episode: "Norm Pimps Wiener Dog"
2002–2003	Crank Yankers	Tony DeLoge/Bob Carlman	8 episodes
2003	Gadget & the Gadgetinis	Himself - Story consultant	52 episodes
2003–2007	Jimmy Kimmel Live!	Himself - Guest / co-Host	22 episodes
2004–2017	Curb Your Enthusiasm	Marty Funkhouser	22 episodes
2005–2006	Arrested Development	Larry Middleman	5 episodes
2008	Welcome to the Captain	Mickey Tittle	Episode: "Mr. Big Meeting"
2009	The Tonight Show with Conan O'Brien	Himself	Episode: "Jessica Biel/Bob Einstein/John Fogerty"
2010–2012	The Life & Times of Tim	Elephant Trainer / The Bookie (voice)	2 episodes
2011	Conan	Himself	Episode: "One Fish, Two Fish, Red Fish - Oh, God, My Whole Life Has Been a Horrible Lie"
2012–2017	Comedians in Cars Getting Coffee	Himself	2 episodes
2013	Anger Management	Hoffler	Episode: "Charlie and Lacey Piss Off the Neighborhood"
2013	Norm Macdonald Live	Super Dave Osborne	2 episodes
2015	Comedy Bang! Bang!	Harvey Wrinkleman	Episode: "Karen Gillan Wears a Black and White Striped Pullover and Coral Skirt"

== Awards and nominations ==
Primetime Emmy Awards

Year	Category	Project	Result	Ref.
1969	Best Writing for a Variety Series	The Smothers Brothers Comedy Hour	Won	
1972	Best Writing Achievement in Variety or Music	The Sonny & Cher Comedy Hour	Nominated	
1974	Best Writing in Variety or Music	The Sonny & Cher Comedy Hour	Nominated	
1976	Best Writing in a Comedy-Variety or Music Special	Van Dyke and Company	Nominated	
1977	Best Writing in a Comedy-Variety or Music Series	Van Dyke and Company	Nominated	
1977	Outstanding Variety or Music Series	Van Dyke and Company	Won	
