= The Razorbacks =

Canadian rockabilly band

- Genres: Rockabilly
- Years active: 1986–1996
- Label: Other People's Music
- Members: Tony Kenny - vocals/guitar Jailhouse Joe Myke - bass Don Dekouchay - drums Donny Cartwright (Donohue) - guitar/ vocals
- Website: https://www.avra-records.com/razorbacks.html

The Razorbacks were a Canadian rockabilly band that attained moderate national popularity in the late 1980s and early 1990s. The band was known for its lively stage show, and made regular appearances on The Tommy Hunter Show on CBC.

== History ==
The Razorbacks were formed in 1986; members were singer/guitarist Tony Kenny, bassist Jail House Joe, drummer Don Dekouchay, and Donny Cartwright. The band began busking and performing in Toronto.

By 1988, The Razorbacks were performing around southern Ontario, and that year they independently released their first album Go to Town. Shortly thereafter the band was signed to Warner Records, which re-released the album. Singles from the album included "It's Saturday Night," which appeared on the RPM Country Singles chart, and "So Much Fun". The band won the CASBY Award for "Most Promising Group", defeating The Tragically Hip.

The Razorbacks appeared on the Super Dave television show called Swim Stadium, season 2, episode 9. In December 1989, the band was featured in their own CBC Television Christmas special, It's a Razorbacks Christmas Barbeque. The special, which saw the band performing original Christmas-themed music, also featured special guest Mary Margaret O'Hara, who received a Gemini Award nomination for Best Performance in a Variety or Performing Arts Program or Series at the 5th Gemini Awards in 1990.

The album Go to Town was re-released in 1997 with four extra tracks.

In 2023, A.V.R.A. Records began digitally reissuing the Razorbacks catalog including unreleased material.

== Discography ==
=== Albums ===
Year	Album	CAN
1988	Go To Town	78
1989	Live A Little	84
1989	It's A Razorbacks Christmas Barbeque	
1996	Flying Jenny	
2024	Early Rarities & Unreleased Gems	

=== Singles ===
Year	Single	Chart Positions		Album
Year	Single	CAN Country	CAN	Album
1988	"It's Saturday Night"	30	68	Go to Town
1989	"Times Like These"	42	95	Live a Little
