= Super Dave (TV series) =

- Also known as: The Super Dave Osborne Show
- Genre: Sketch comedy Variety
- Created by: Allan Blye; Bob Einstein
- Directed by: Jack Budgel
- Starring: Super Dave Osborne; Robert Gruenberg; Art Irizawa; Don Lake; Michel Lauzière; Pat McNeilly; Mike Walden
- Composer: James Dale
- Countries of origin: Canada; United States
- Original language: English
- No. of seasons: 5
- No. of episodes: 95 (list of episodes)

Production
- Production locations: Glen Warren Studios, Toronto, Ontario (1987–1988); Markham Theatre for the Performing Arts, Markham, Ontario (1988–1991)
- Camera setup: Multi-camera
- Running time: 22–24 minutes

Original release
- Network: Showtime (United States); Global Television Network (Canada)
- Release: 1987 – 1991

Related
- Bizarre; "Super Dave All-Stars"; Super Dave: Daredevil for Hire

Super Dave (also known as The Super Dave Osborne Show) is a variety show starring and hosted by the fictional character Super Dave Osborne (played by Bob Einstein). It ran from 1987 to 1991 in the United States on Showtime and in Canada on the Global Television Network (then operating only in Ontario) and in first-run syndication (in all other parts of Canada). The show currently airs reruns on Adult Swim Canada.

The character made his first appearance on the 1972 TV series The John Byner Comedy Hour. Einstein then regularly played the character on the short-lived 1976 variety series Van Dyke and Company, starring Dick Van Dyke.

Einstein revived the character for the 1980–1986 sketch comedy series Bizarre, which spun off his own series in 1987. After the last season, Einstein won a 1992 CableAce Award for Best Actor in a Comedy Series.

An animated spinoff, Super Dave: Daredevil for Hire, aired for one season on Fox TV from 1992 to 1993.

== Format ==
Super Dave was a variety show with each episode featuring various segments that varied from episode to episode. The main segment of the show was usually presented by Osborne from the stage of a TV studio/theatre before a live studio audience. Depending on the episode, the studio would be the setting for an introductory monologue, guest performers, interactions with the audience, and other comedy bits. The show featured performances from both famous and up-and-coming musicians, comedians and other performers. Up-and-coming performers were often presented as a member of Osborne's staff, a talented audience member, or a participant in one of Osborne's training programs.

In the show's universe, the studio was said to be located at the fictional "Super Dave Compound", a combination resort/theme park/learning center/etc. (anything which would be required for any particular episode). In the first season, in 1987, the compound was often referred to as the "stunt compound" or "Super Dave Complex".

Other segments of the show were shot on location at various indoor and outdoor locations, usually said to be a part of the compound. Some episodes opened with a cold open on location, while others began with the studio introduction.

Most episodes ended on location with Osborne either giving a tour of an area of his compound, or performing a "stunt". He was usually accompanied by announcer Mike Walden, and often joined by Osborne's stunt coordinator Fuji Hakayito or his compound manager Donald Glanz.

Whether performing a stunt, or giving a tour of an area of the compound, in most instances, something goes awry, resulting in Osborne being severely and cartoonishly injured to end the show. There were rare episodes in which he had been injured before the show began, and was already in the hospital, or in which he was not injured at all.

Osborne's signature daredevil stunts were generally unrealistically over-the-top extreme death-defying feats, often involving elaborate contraptions created by Hakayito.

Example of these stunts included riding inside the hub of a giant yo-yo suspended from a crane (the yo-yo broke free of its string and rolled off a cliff), and being flung inside a giant football (the catapult malfunctioned and "spiked" the football into the ground). After an injury occurred, Super Dave would usually appear torn apart, burned, flattened, stretched, or otherwise injured. One of his signature logos is a drawing of his head (in a helmet or his baseball cap) on top of a pair of crushed silver boots with no body. This was occasionally how he appeared after a stunt resulted in something falling on top of him.

== Production ==
The studio segments of Super Dave were initially shot at the Glen Warren Studios theatre at CTV Television Network headquarters at CFTO-TV in the Toronto suburb of Scarborough.

In the original studio, the "stage" was set on the studio floor and was surrounded by a semicircle of cramped bleacher-style seats, with audience members often sitting on the stairs. It was the same studio where the popular comedy program Bizarre with John Byner had been taped.

Starting with the second season, filming of the studio portions moved to the Markham Theatre in Markham, Ontario, a proper theatre with a raised stage, balcony seating, and private boxes.

In both studios, the stage featured a signature "bulb wall" - a wall lined with rows of red, white and blue light bulbs - which was raised and lowered to act as a curtain. The bulb wall was flanked by columns of blue light bulbs. Behind the bulb wall, at the back of the stage was a smaller wall of all white light bulbs that were used to spell out words such as the names of performers. The studio seating was decorated with red white and blue semi-circular bunting.

Although Osborne often purported that the show was broadcast live as a pretext for why edits could not be made, the show was pre-recorded.

Segments outside of the studio were filmed at various locations usually in the Greater Toronto Area.

Super Dave's personal "racetrack" (where he drove a "specialized" race car and crashed) was the Riverside International Raceway in Moreno Valley, California.

Musical guests on the show included young drummer Jacob Armen, Banig (Josephine Roberto), Veronique Beliveau, Sonny Bono, Liona Boyd, Glen Campbell, Kim Carnes, Ray Charles, Celine Dion, Thelma Houston, Colin James, k.d. lang, Jerry Lee Lewis, Melissa Manchester, Loreena McKennitt, Bill Medley, Bobby McFerrin, Kenny Rogers, Michelle Wright, Lori Yates, along with musical groups like En Vogue, and Canadian Blue Rodeo, Doug and The Slugs, The Nylons, and The Razorbacks.

Some of the other performers who were featured included classical comedic pianist Mitchell Zeidwig, stuntman Robbie Knievel, ventriloquist Willie Tyler and Lester, ventriloquist Ronn Lucas, ventriloquist Jeff Dunham, sports broadcaster Roy Firestone, juggler Robert Gruenberg, comedic juggler Edward Jackman, talk show interviewer Larry King, juggler Michel Lauziere, tap dancer Savion Glover, impressionist André-Philippe Gagnon, boxer Evander Holyfield, comedian Steve Allen, comic Jenny Jones, talk show host Regis Philbin and the Smothers Brothers, whose variety show Einstein got his start writing for.

== Recurring characters ==
Super Dave was accompanied by several recurring characters including:

- Mike Walden, Super Dave's announcer, whose loud suits were frequently the subject of mockery. He was almost always present in the remote segments. Walden would often say "Get that thing out of here!" after a failed stunt using dangerous machinery. He would also constantly remark that the safety harnesses were made with Genuine Saskatchewan Seal-Skin Bindings.
- Fuji Hakayito (Art Irizawa), Super Dave's stunt coordinator who spoke in a thick Japanese accent.
- Donald Glanz (Don Lake), the manager of the Super Dave Compound.
- A Trinidadian steel drum band led by that only knew how to play Barry Manilow's song "Copacabana". They always appeared standing in for another band (usually the never-seen Super Dave Band) who were unable to appear on the show when scheduled, due to being at a bar mitzvah. The steel drum band claimed to have a vast repertoire, and the band's leader (Pan Man Pat McNeilly) would always confirm they knew all the songs to be played. The band would nevertheless invariably play "Copacabana", frustrating Super Dave. Several of the band’s appearances were ostensibly for contests like “stump the band” or “name that tune”.
- Michel Lauzière, a supposed backstage worker who often came onstage unannounced to do an interesting performance or magic trick, much to the chagrin of Super Dave. After being told not to come back until he had something "unique", he would usually return seconds later with a different trick.
- Robert Gruenberg, an unfortunate resident of the "Super Dave Confidence Building Area", where subjects are interred in underground chambers to overcome their fears. He is afraid to juggle bowling pins due to stage fright, but amazingly is able to juggle more difficult and dangerous items such as chainsaws, machetes and bowling balls at once. After he does so, he sadly states he still cannot juggle bowling pins, which leads to him being locked up again back underground.
- Bernie Weinthal, Super Dave's midget attorney, who in actual fact was a longtime bellman at the Royal York Hotel in Toronto, Ontario, Canada.
- Tony Cox, the president of the network, who always ended up getting Super Dave irritated somehow.
- Danny Menendez, a seldom seen camera man who is often mentioned by Super Dave.

== Running gags ==
- An early joke carried over from Super Dave’s earlier appearances (and was abandoned early in the first season) was Mike Walden mispronouncing Fuji's surname differently every time he mentioned him. As a later gag, Walden was occasionally unable to understand Fuji's explanations of stunts, though, despite his heavy accent, the explanations are quite understandable.
- Mike Walden would often comment that safety equipment included "genuine Saskatchewan seal skin bindings" (even though Saskatchewan is completely landlocked).
- The stunts/injuries were usually done with the use of dummies, and Super Dave would often do overdubs both during and after the stunt.
- Super Dave would often ask for help after his injuries, requests which Mike, Donald, and Fuji usually ignored or misunderstood, and leave him alone injured. If they did acknowledge he was hurt, their attempts to help him would usually result in further injury.
- Super Dave would often overdub a "goodnight" speech while waiting injured.
- Super Dave would often comment on his associates' incompetence; he would often refer to Mike Walden as a "putz". Every now and then, he would swear, but it was always bleeped out with a duck's quack or a horn honk, both from Bizarre.
- Super Dave did utter "Holy Chim" in reaction to sudden pain from stunts starting to go wrong, like his barefoot firewalking stunt, which he collapsed at the end of, after yelling "Holy S<bleep>"
- Scenes would often continue after the characters believed the cameras were turned off.
- Super Dave would often be hit or run over by a vehicle, even when the sequence had nothing to do with them, and often including ambulances after he had already been hurt.
- Some of Super Dave's common catchphrases on the show included noting that something great would "knock your socks off", and exclaiming "new pain!" or "no pain!" when he was being injured.
- Super Dave often presented himself as a selfless altruistic person, but was often undercut by revelations or implications that he was actually acting for profit or self-interest.
- Super Dave was often presented with honors and awards, and then reminded his staff that he did not like to be embarrassed by doing so on the air. He would often receive a trophy, say how much it meant to him, then casually toss it away behind him.
- Super Dave would often respond to criticism from a supposedly disreputable or trashy news source; he would then often reveal the name of the source to be a reputable source such as 60 Minutes.
- The show was often said to be running late, and Super Dave would often chide people for wasting time. At other times, when a show ended with a tour of some area of the compound, the show was often said to be running out of time for Super Dave’s planned stunt. After he would be injured during the tour, Walden would note that they were now out of time for the stunt, ignoring Super Dave’s injury.
- When naming famous people or other two-word proper names, Super Dave often would mistake one of the names and be corrected by Mike or someone else nearby, though he seems not to notice. For example, "tennis great Johnny Connors", corrected quickly by Mike Walden to "Jimmy".
- Super Dave would usually arrive at his stunt and tour segments in a vehicle, often with Donald or Fuji, to a waiting Mike Walden. He would sometimes arrive in unique vehicles including a personal hovercraft and an amphibious car.
- Many Super Dave commercial products were shown, and some were shown to have inflated prices. Other services at the Super Dave Compound were shown to have inflated prices.
- He would sometimes invite audience members to participate in contests where they would be winning until the last question, and then be faced with an impossible final requirement, and lose a big prize in favor of Super Dave hats and shirts.
- If Fuji was being exceptionally annoying, Super Dave would usually hand Fuji a small dumbbell, asking him "Here, hold this". Upon grabbing the dumbbell, Fuji would promptly fall to the floor due to its weight.
- Donald frequently stated as to be celebrating a special event in his life, be it a promotion, a special award, or the birth of one of his children all of whom had at least one odd given name.

== On-air promotion ==
Weekly 30-second promos were produced by Showtime Networks to promote the series. The announcer was Doug Jeffers, who abandoned his typical breathy relaxed style for one that was more ringmaster-like in tone and emphasis. The music bed for each promo was a generic track called "Circus, Circus, Circus". The producer of the bulk of these promos was Steve Kolodny, who was given a yearly appearance on the show as "a film student who has produced a Super Dave music video".

== Syndication ==
Reruns started airing on Comedy Gold on September 6, 2011. The show was dropped from its schedule in September 2015.

It is currently rerunning on Adult Swim Canada since October 11, 2021.
