= Michel Lauzière =

Canadian comedian (born 1954)

Michel Lauzière (born 1954) is a Canadian comedian and musical performer known for his unusual visual comedy acts and inventive use of everyday objects as musical instruments. Lauziere began performing in 1975 in a duo called Les Foubrac, with Jean Roy. Since then, Lauziere has performed his one-man show to an estimated 1 billion viewers on five continents.

One famous performance was done for the Late Show with David Letterman. Lauziere rollerbladed through a closed street, playing Georges Bizet's Toreador Song on tuned wine bottles. Lauziere had a recurring role on the Super Dave Osborne Show and he also performed on the 1994, 1995, 1996, 2007, Jerry Lewis MDA Telethon.

== Early life ==
Michel Lauziere was born in 1954 in Drummondville, Quebec, Canada. He was raised in Quebec and began exploring performance-related activities at a young age, including juggling and acrobatics during his teenage years.

Before dedicating himself fully to entertainment, he worked as a freelance cartoonist for local publications while studying psychology at the college level in the early 1970s. These early creative and academic experiences contributed to the development of his multidisciplinary performance style, which later incorporated visual humor, music, and physical theater.

In 1975, he began his professional career as a part of the comedy duo Les Foubrac with Jean Roy. The duo performed throughout Quebec and developed a physical and absurdist comedy style combining juggling, acrobatics, and musical invention, which later influenced Lauziere's solo work.

== Career ==
In 1975, Michel Lauziere began his professional performance career as part of the comedy duo Les Foubrac with Jean Roy. The duo performed across Quebec and developed a style of physical and absurdist comedy combining juggling, acrobatics, and musical invention from Lauziere's solo work.

During this period (1975-1988), Les Foubrac built their reputation through stage performances in Quebec and became known for their inventive and multidisciplinary approach to comedy, blending circus-style skills with theatrical performance.

After more than a decade performing as a duo, Lauziere transitioned toward solo work at the end of the 1980s. In 1989. He began his solo career, expanding his performance style internationally and developing one-man shows built around visual comedy, invented musical instruments, and physical performance techniques.
