= Van Dyke and Company =

- Genre: Comedy-Variety
- Directed by: John Moffitt
- Starring: Dick Van Dyke
- Country of origin: United States
- Original language: English
- No. of seasons: 1
- No. of episodes: 11

Production
- Executive producer: Byron Paul
- Running time: 60 mins

Original release
- Network: NBC
- Release: September 20 – December 30, 1976

Van Dyke and Company is an American comedy and variety show television series hosted by Dick Van Dyke on NBC in 1976. Andy Kaufman made his prime time debut on the show and became a series regular. The executive producer of the show, Byron Paul, was the manager and producer to Dick Van Dyke. The pilot episode was directed by Art Fisher and aired as a CBS TV special on October 30, 1975. The series aired from September 20, 1976, to December 30, 1976, before it was cancelled due to low ratings. Despite its cancellation, the show won an Emmy Award for Outstanding Variety Series at the 29th Primetime Emmy Awards in 1977. Van Dyke also won Favorite Male Performer in a New TV Program at the 3rd People's Choice Awards.

== Episodes ==
Episode No.	Airdate	Guests
Pilot	Oct 30, 1975	Carl Reiner, Ike & Tina Turner, Gabe Kaplan, Kenneth Mars, Lynne Lipton
1	Sep 20, 1976	Chevy Chase, Flip Wilson, Andy Kaufman
2	Oct 7, 1976	John Denver, Ilie Nastase, Super Dave Osborne, Andy Kaufman
3	Oct 14, 1976	Carl Reiner, Andy Kaufman
4	Oct 28, 1976	Hal Linden, The Sylvers, Andy Kaufman
5	Nov 11, 1976	Carol Burnett, KC and the Sunshine Band, Andy Kaufman
6	Nov 18, 1976	Harvey Korman, Lola Falana
7	Nov 25, 1976	Freddie Prinze, The Spinners, George Foreman, Andy Kaufman
8	Dec 2, 1976	Sid Caesar, Donna Fargo, Andy Kaufman
9	Dec 9, 1976	Lucille Ball, The Lockers, Andy Kaufman
10	Dec 16, 1976	John Byner, Bobbie Gentry, Andy Kaufman
11	Dec 30, 1976	Tommy Smothers, Jim McKay, Sha Na Na, Andy Kaufman
