= Super Dave: Daredevil for Hire =

- Genre: Slapstick comedy
- Developed by: Reed Shelly; Bruce Shelly
- Directed by: Joe Barruso
- Theme music composer: Mike Watts
- Composer: Tom Worrall
- Countries of origin: United States; Italy
- Original language: English
- No. of episodes: 13 (plus 1 special)

Production
- Executive producers: Bob Einstein; Andy Heyward; Robby London
- Producer: Michael Maliani
- Running time: 30 minutes (with commercials)
- Production companies: DIC Animation City; Blye-Einstein Productions; Reteitalia; Sae Rom/Plus One Productions

Original release
- Network: FOX (Fox Kids) (U.S.); Telecinco (Spain)
- Release: September 12, 1992 – 1993

Super Dave: Daredevil for Hire is an animated series produced by DIC Animation City and Reteitalia, S.p.A., in association with Spanish network Telecinco.

In the United States, the show premiered on September 12, 1992 on FOX. The series was cancelled after its first season, but a special based on the series titled The Super Dave Superbowl of Knowledge aired on January 29, 1994. It was later shown in reruns on Toon Disney from 1998-2002.

The show starred and was based on the comedy of Bob Einstein and his Super Dave Osborne persona. Both Bob Einstein and Art Irizawa provided the voices for Super Dave and his assistant, Fuji Hakayito, and also appeared as their characters in live-action skits which ended each episode.

Halfway through the show's initial run, Irizawa was asked to modify his voice for Fuji, following complaints to Fox from Asian-American groups that the character was an offensive stereotype. Irizawa subsequently re-recorded his dialogue for all of the show's episodes.

== Cast ==
- Bob Einstein as Super Dave Osborne
- Art Irizawa as Fuji Hakayito

=== Additional ===
- Charlie Adler as Slash Hazard
- Jack Angel
- Jesse Corti
- Brian George
- Don Lake
- Susan Silo
- Kath Soucie
- Louise Vallance
- B. J. Ward
- Frank Welker

== Episodes ==
No.	Title	Written by	Original release date
1	"Super Bowl, Super Bomb, Super Dave!"	Robert Askin	September 12, 1992
2	"Space Case"	Reed Shelly & Bruce Shelly	September 19, 1992
3	"Bullet Train Pain"	Richard Mueller & Bob Einstein	September 26, 1992
4	"Con Job"	Bob Forward & Bob Einstein	TBA
5	"In His President's Secret Service"	Rowby Goren	TBA
6	"The Fuji-tive"	Judy Rothman	TBA
7	"Double Agent Dave"	Phil Harnage	TBA
8	"Happy Trails"	Robert Askin	TBA
9	"Hazard Island"	J. Larry Carroll & David Bennett Carren	TBA
10	"Put Another Candle On My Birthday Cake"	Robert Askin	TBA
11	"Pain Nine from Outer Space"	Robert Askin	TBA
12	"Merry Christmas, Super Dave!"	Reed Shelly & Bruce Shelly	TBA
13	"Super's Last Show"	Jack Hanrahan & Eleanor Burian-Mohr	1993

== Home media ==
In the United States, Buena Vista Home Video released two single-episode VHS's of the series in 1993, which featured the episodes "Space Case" and "Con Job".

A VHS tape of the series was released in the United Kingdom by Abbey Home Entertainment in February 1994, under their Tempo Kids Club label.

The series was later released on DVD in South Korea in the 2000s.
