= Super Dave Osborne =

- First appearance: The John Byner Comedy Hour
- Created by: Bob Einstein
- Portrayed by: Bob Einstein

In-universe information
- Nickname: Super Dave
- Gender: Male
- Occupation: Stunt performer
- Nationality: American

Super Dave Osborne is a character created and played by comedian Bob Einstein. Einstein's comedic depiction was of a naive, although always optimistic, stuntman who was frequently, comically injured when his stunts went spectacularly wrong.

== Character sketch ==
Super Dave is billed as an "accomplished" stuntman, although he rarely succeeded when performing his elaborate stunts. Typically, the character would perform outrageous daredevil stunts, which often went disastrously awry resulting in the appearance of grievous bodily injury. These included such mishaps as being knocked off the top of the enormously high CN Tower, in Toronto, after determining it was too windy to do a cabled jump or being run over by a steamroller after failing to escape from inside a locked trunk. After such a mishap, Super Dave would usually appear torn apart, stretched, or otherwise injured. Although Super Dave initially exhibited and was injured during wild stunts, in later appearances, he would often be injured in mishaps during much more mundane events during which danger was not anticipated.

His signature logo, a caricature of his head inside a crash helmet directly atop a pair of crushed silver boots with no visible body, was from an iconic early sketch, "Balloon Ball", a "stunt" consisting of his standing in a hole in the ground reciting "Balloon Ball" as a mantra which was supposed to imbue him with the ability to not be harmed by anything, as a mobile pile driver rammed the top of his head a number of times. When pulled out of the hole, he then appeared as his eventual logo depicted: his helmeted head sitting directly atop his smashed down silver boots, the whole of his body supposedly compressed between boots and neck.

Super Dave is often accompanied on his various exploits by a loyal friend, sidekick, and assistant stunt coordinator Fuji Hakayito (played by comedian Art Irizawa), and his segments are introduced and commentated on by former sportscaster/actor Mike Walden. Fuji typically initiates whatever stunt Dave is performing.

Super Dave operated his fictional "Super Dave Compound", a combination resort, theme park, learning center, and anything else needed for the plot-line of a particular episode. Many of his misadventures were based on demonstrating various aspects of the compound. Another characteristic was the utterance of the phrase "Holy Chim" (a bowdlerized version of "holy shit"), usually when the stunt was ongoing and he realized he was in over his head, notably his barefoot fire-walker stunt. When reflecting on the failed stunt, Super Dave would, in annoyance, call Walden a putz.

Trademark components of the Super Dave character include his frequent thumbs-ups and his many jump suit uniforms — most of which include red, white and blue, yellow stars, and stripes — which are reminiscent of those worn by daredevil Evel Knievel. It was often specified that Osborne's safety harnesses or seatbelts were made of "genuine Saskatchewan sealskin bindings". Seals do not live in the landlocked province of Saskatchewan, and the safety specs are thus part of the comedy predicated on the eventual failure of the stunt.

== Appearance history ==
=== Television ===
- The John Byner Comedy Hour (1972); first appearance of the character
- Van Dyke and Company (1976)
- The Redd Foxx Comedy Hour (1977)
- Bizarre (1980–1986)
- The Tonight Show Starring Johnny Carson (1980s), recurring guest
- Late Night with David Letterman (1980s), recurring guest
- Super Dave (1987–1992)
- Super Dave: Daredevil for Hire (1992)
- In Living Color (1993)
- WWE Monday Night RAW (1994–1995)
- Super Dave's Vegas Spectacular (1995)
- Super Dave's All Stars (1997)
- Hollywood Squares (1998–2004), recurring guest
- Super Dave's Spike-Tacular (2009)
- The Tonight Show with Conan O'Brien (November 11, 2009)
- TNA Impact! (November 12, 2009)
- Conan (July 21, 2011)
- Norm Macdonald Live (March 26, 2013)
- Anger Management (April 2013)

=== Feature film ===
- The Extreme Adventures of Super Dave (2000)

=== Commercials ===
- Super Dave was featured in Nike commercials in 1990, comparing his latest dunking contraptions to the Nike Air Flight basketball shoe, and appearing with such NBA stars as Reggie Miller, Kenny Smith, and Gerald Wilkins (whom he called Roger, Bennie, and Harold, respectively, and was then corrected by Mike Walden). When his contraption went wrong, he either went through the wall, the ceiling, or into a backboard, then he would say he hurt or broke an unusual part of his body, to which Walden would confirm, "Well, of course you did!"
- On several occasions in the late 1990s, Super Dave appeared in commercials for Haggar Clothing. Some notable stunts: going through an extreme car wash, and falling off a motor home with much heavy debris landing on him to show that Haggar's cotton-based clothing will never wrinkle.
