= Bizarre (TV series) =

- Directed by: Maurice Abraham (1980–1982); Jack Budgell (1982–1986)
- Starring: John Byner; Bob Einstein; Philip Akin; George Allen; Harvey Atkin; Billy Barty; Cynthia Belliveau; Tanya Boyd; Dave Broadfoot; George Buza; Lally Cadeau; Christine Cattell; George Cowan; Jennifer Dale; Richard Dawson; Laura Dickson; Jack Duffy; Jayne Eastwood; John Evans; Astrid Falconi; S.J. Fellowes; Barry Flatman; Redd Foxx; David Fraser; Candace Frazee; Brian George; Luba Goy; Nonnie Griffin; Lori Hallier; Barbara Hamilton; Tom Harvey; John Hemphill; Laura Henry; Ken James; Keith Knight; Mimi Kuzyk; Don Lake; Kathleen Laskey; Carrie Leigh; Cec Linder; Ziggy Lorenc; Kate Lynch; David Merry; Jack Newman; Pat Marsden; Viki Matthews; Annie McAuley; Debra McGrath; Julie McLeod; Sherry Miller; Pat Morita; Mike Myers; Kathy Nagy; Mark Parr; Suzie Pellman; Earl Pennington; Donnelly Rhodes; Dar Robinson; Laura Robinson; Wayne Robson; Mary Beth Rubens; Saul Rubinek; Elijah Siegler; Sharolyn Sparrow; Beau Starr; Nancy Steen; Melissa Steinberg; Eric Taslitz; Dave Thomas; Theresa Tova; Billy Van; Mike Walden; Irene Walters; Roberta Weiss; Steve Weston; Michael Wincott
- Music by: James Dale
- Country of origin: Canada
- Original language: English
- No. of seasons: 6
- No. of episodes: 141 (list of episodes)

Production
- Executive producers: Allan Blye (1980–1982); Bob Einstein (1980–1982)
- Producers: Perry Rosemond (1980–1982); Allan Blye (1982–1986); Bob Einstein (1982–1986)
- Running time: 22 minutes
- Production companies: Shiral Productions; Showtime

Original release
- Network: CTV (Canada); Showtime (United States)
- Release: September 18, 1980 – September 1986

Related
- Super Dave

Bizarre is a Canadian sketch comedy television series that aired from 1980 to 1986. Hosted by John Byner, the series was produced by CTV at the CFTO's Glen Warren Studios in Scarborough, Ontario. It was initially broadcast in Canada on CTV and in the United States on Showtime.

== Synopsis ==
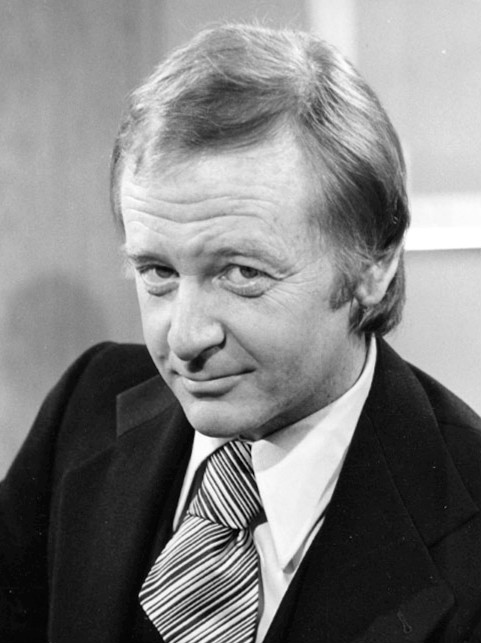
John Byner in 1976

The series featured slapstick sketches, monologues, parodies of television programs, and performances by guest stand-up comedians. John Byner's interactions with the studio audience and with producer Bob Einstein—who frequently interrupted sketches to halt them midway—broke the fourth wall, an uncommon technique at the time. Much of the humor was considered risqué during the show’s original run.

The show employed a rotating ensemble cast that supported Byner in sketches. In addition to Einstein, the cast included Philip Akin, Harvey Atkin, Billy Barty, Cynthia Belliveau, Jack Duffy, Jayne Eastwood, Barbara Hamilton, John Hemphill, Barry Flatman, Keith Knight, Don Lake, Kathleen Laskey, Kate Lynch, Pat Morita, Debra McGrath, Mike Myers, Earl Pennington, Melissa Steinberg, Billy Van, Steve Weston, and Wayne and Shuster alumnus Tom Harvey.

Guest stars during the series' run included Steve Allen, Frances Bay, Redd Foxx, Luba Goy, Victoria Jackson, Murray Langston (as The Unknown Comic), Howie Mandel, Dave Thomas, Willie Tyler & Lester, Marc Weiner, and Henny Youngman.

=== Super Dave Osborne ===
A regular feature of the show was Super Dave Osborne, a parody of daredevils such as Evel Knievel, portrayed by Bob Einstein. In these segments, Super Dave would attempt elaborate mock stunts designed to captivate viewers, a reporter (usually Mike Walden) would assist in framing the sketch. The stunts invariably ended in catastrophic failure, resulting in severe (but comedic) injuries to Super Dave. The sketches typically concluded with a wide shot of the aftermath, showing Super Dave in a humorous predicament, such as being buried, encased, or launched, while he feigned agony and provided commentary. This often included details about the next stunt, explanations for the failure, or threats directed at the reporter.

One memorable Super Dave sketch involved a stunt where he stood under a pile driver and attempted to remain unharmed by repeating the nonsensical phrase "balloon ball." As expected, the stunt failed, leaving Super Dave reduced to a helmeted head atop a pair of shoes. This sketch became so popular that in the following season, Showtime advertisements for Bizarre featured a cartoon logo of Super Dave’s helmeted head and shoes.

The popularity of the Super Dave sketches eventually led to a spin-off series, Super Dave, which adopted a more family-friendly tone.

=== Content editing ===
Two versions of Bizarre were produced. The episodes that aired on Showtime in the United States featured nudity and coarse language, while the versions broadcast on CTV in Canada, and later in syndication, had the nudity removed and the language censored using a horn-honking sound. The uncensored version also aired on a few independent U.S. television stations during the 1980s as late-night programming.

For Canadian broadcasts and syndication, sketches featuring nudity were censored by substituting reverse-angle shots filmed from behind nude actors (usually women appearing topless) or alternate takes where the actors wore bras. In rare instances involving nudity below the waist, the scenes were cut abruptly.

The uncensored version also aired regionally in the United Kingdom on ITV, typically after 11 pm, with some of the stronger language censored using conventional bleeps.

The uncensored version has not been aired since the original Showtime broadcasts and syndication ended in the late 1980s and have not been made available for syndication. The censored episodes have continued to be rebroadcast.

== Development ==
Bizarre was originally developed for ABC. In 1979, ABC was looking into re-entering the late night television market amid reports of Johnny Carson potentially leaving NBC's The Tonight Show due to a contract dispute. ABC made overtures to Carson and to Richard Dawson, then working for ABC as the host of their daytime game show Family Feud and also serving as Carson's regular guest host. Carson eventually renewed with NBC.

Dawson taped the pilot for Bizarre at Television City Studios in Hollywood, which aired as a special on ABC on March 20, 1979. However, neither Dawson nor ABC chose to proceed with the project. ABC ultimately pursued other late-night programming, including Fridays and Nightline.

Production of Bizarre later moved to Canada, enabling the series to qualify for Canadian content credits while retaining a predominantly American cast. Impressionist John Byner was brought in as the host. The premiere episode of Bizarre featured several sketches that had been part of the Dawson pilot.

== DVD release ==
DVDs of the unedited version of Bizarre, titled The Best of Bizarre Uncensored, were released in late 2005 by Visual Entertainment. These DVDs are available for purchase through Canadian and U.S. retailers. Since July 2007, nine individual volumes have been released.

Although the episodes on the DVDs are uncensored in terms of language and nudity, most do not include the original end credits. These credits originally featured sponsorship plugs for the Royal York Hotel and Tilden Rent-a-Car. A generic "DVD credits" sequence is included on each disc to give credit to those who worked on the series. An exception is episode 47 (on Volume Five), where the sponsorship plugs remain due to a comment made by Super Dave Osborne. Episodes that featured live-action sketches during the end credits generally still include these sequences.

== Reruns ==
The uncensored version of Bizarre has not aired on television since the original Showtime broadcasts and syndication ended in the late 1980s. The censored episodes have continued to be rebroadcast in Canada, with airings as recent as 2003, primarily to meet Canadian content requirements.

Bizarre aired on The Comedy Network from 1997 to 2003. It was later broadcast on TV Land Canada, which rebranded as Comedy Gold, from New Year's Eve 2008 until August 2011.
