= The Building (TV series) =

- Genre: Sitcom
- Created by: Bonnie Hunt
- Written by: Bonnie Hunt
- Directed by: John Bowab
- Starring: Bonnie Hunt; Mike Hagerty; Richard Kulhman; Don Lake; Tom Virtue; Holly Wortell
- Opening theme: "The Building" performed by Rob Kolson
- Country of origin: United States
- Original language: English
- No. of seasons: 1
- No. of episodes: 5

Production
- Executive producers: Bonnie Hunt; David Letterman
- Cinematography: Jo Mayer
- Running time: 30 minutes
- Production companies: Bob & Alice Productions; Worldwide Pants Incorporated; Columbia Pictures Television; CBS Entertainment Productions

Original release
- Network: CBS
- Release: August 20 – September 17, 1993

Related
- Bonnie (1995)

The Building is an American sitcom television series with dramatic elements created, written by and starring Bonnie Hunt that aired on CBS from August 20 to September 17, 1993. Although it was praised by critics, it earned low Nielsen ratings and was canceled after only five episodes, leaving one episode unaired.

== Premise ==
Bonnie Kennedy, a commercial actress who was jilted by her fiancé, returns to Chicago to start a new life in an apartment across from Wrigley Field. The story focuses on Kennedy's struggles and the characters who live in her apartment building.

== Production ==
Bonnie Hunt created the show, wrote four of the five broadcast episodes and starred as Bonnie Kennedy.

Making heavy use of the Second City alumni, the show had a theatrical sensibility and minor mistakes, accidents and forgotten lines were included in the aired episodes, with a loose improvisational feel to certain scenes. The Building was the first sitcom production of David Letterman's Worldwide Pants production company. Letterman appears (unbilled) in a character role in the second episode. A sixth episode was produced, but did not air.

Two years after the show was canceled, cast members Hunt, Don Lake, Tom Virtue and Holly Wortell reunited in the series The Bonnie Hunt Show. Hunt and Wortell also starred in Life With Bonnie. Both The Bonnie Hunt Show and Life With Bonnie retained many of the distinguishing characteristics of The Building, including the Chicago setting, an improvisational/theatrical feel and the nature of the characters' relationships.

== Cast ==
- Bonnie Hunt as Bonnie Kennedy, a struggling actress, best known as the "Randolph Carpet Girl" in a series of local ads.
- Holly Wortell as Holly, Bonnie's best friend and fellow actress.
- Don Lake as Brad, who lives downstairs. Brad often visits to for coffee and food.
- Tom Virtue as Stan, an actor and Brad's roommate. Tom and Bonnie are attracted to each other.
- Richard Kuhlman as Big Tony, who is rough around the edges but generally decent and friendly, Big Tony lives upstairs and maintains the building. His wife Antionette is often heard yelling loudly offstage but is never seen.
- Mike Hagerty as Finley, a former firefighter who runs the nearby bar called G&L Fire Escape.
- Andy Dick as Joe Devane, a talkative casting agent.

== Episodes ==
No.	Title	Directed by	Written by	Original release date
1	"Pilot"	John Bowab	Bonnie Hunt	August 20, 1993
Guest star: George Clooney
2	"Damned If You Do"	John Bowab	Bonnie Hunt	August 27, 1993
Guest star: David Letterman
3	"The Waiting Game"	Paul Kreppel	Elaine Arata	September 3, 1993
Guest star: George Wendt
4	"Father Knows Best"	John Bowab	Bonnie Hunt	September 10, 1993
Guest stars: Richard Kind & Donald O'Connor
5	"Yakkity Yak Don't Talk"	John Bowab	Bonnie Hunt	September 17, 1993
Guest star: Jim Belushi
