= Bonnie (TV series) =

- Also known as: The Bonnie Hunt Show
- Genre: Sitcom
- Created by: Bonnie Hunt; Rob Burnett
- Written by: Bonnie Hunt
- Directed by: John Bowab
- Starring: Bonnie Hunt
- Country of origin: United States
- Original language: English
- No. of seasons: 1
- No. of episodes: 13 (2 unaired)

Production
- Executive producers: Bonnie Hunt; Rob Burnett; David Letterman
- Producers: Robert Wright; John Bowab
- Editor: Evan Wright
- Production companies: Bob & Alice Productions; Worldwide Pants Incorporated

Original release
- Network: CBS
- Release: September 22, 1995 – April 7, 1996

Related
- The Building (1993)

Bonnie (originally titled The Bonnie Hunt Show) is an American sitcom television series that aired on CBS from September 22, 1995 to April 7, 1996. Bonnie Hunt plays Bonnie Kelly, a television reporter who moves from Wisconsin to take a job with a Chicago television station where she encounters an eclectic group of coworkers.

In addition to the stories concerning Bonnie's life inside and out of the station, each episode includes one of Bonnie's television news features, in which Hunt would improvise interviews with real people attending or involved in current real local events.

== Cast ==
- Bonnie Hunt as Bonnie Kelly
- Mark Derwin as Bill Kirkland
- Brian Howe as Sammy Sinatra
- Don Lake as Keith Jedzik
- Tom Virtue as Tom Vandoozer
- Holly Wortell as Holly Janovsky

== Production notes ==
The series premiered as The Bonnie Hunt Show in September 1995 and aired under that title for the first six episodes before being placed on hiatus in November. Upon returning to the air in March, the show was retitled Bonnie and ran for an additional five episodes in a new Sunday-night timeslot. Despite improved ratings, the show was canceled, and the last two episodes were never aired.

As with Bonnie Hunt's previous short-run 1993 sitcom The Building, The Bonnie exhibited a theatrical sensibility and minor mistakes, accidents and forgotten lines were often preserved in the aired episodes. Cast members Hunt, Don Lake, Tom Virtue and Holly Wortell had all starred in The Building, which was also set in Chicago, produced by David Letterman's Worldwide Pants production company and directed by John Bowab. Hunt created Bonnie with Rob Burnett and wrote most of the episodes.

Hunt's next sitcom Life With Bonnie, created by Hunt and Lake, also featured Hunt, Derwin and Wortell, and it also focused on a Chicago news personality. Virtue had a recurring role on the show and Bowab directed several episodes.

== Episodes ==
No.	Title	Directed by	Written by	Original release date	Viewers (millions)
1	"First Day"	Unknown	Rob Burnett and Bonnie Hunt	September 22, 1995	9.1
2	"Another Day at the Office"	John Bowab	Bonnie Hunt	September 29, 1995	7.8
3	"The Phone Call"	John Bowab	Steve Faber and Bob Fisher	October 6, 1995	8.3
4	"True Lies"	Unknown	Michael Short	October 13, 1995	7.5
5	"Better Offer"	John Bowab	Bonnie Hunt (as Alice Jatczak)	October 20, 1995	6.5
6	"Here's a Little Halloween Twist"	John Bowab	Elaine Arata	October 27, 1995	5.8
7	"Up All Night"	John Bowab	Bonnie Hunt, Elaine Arata, Steve Faber and Bob Fisher	March 10, 1996	11.3
8	"On the Streets Where You Live"	John Bowab	Bonnie Hunt	March 17, 1996	13.6
9	"Hair Today, Gone Merlot"	Unknown	Bonnie Hunt	March 24, 1996	11.8
10	"To See or Not to See"	Unknown	Elaine Arata	March 31, 1996	11.9
11	"Beginning of the Beginning"	Unknown	Bonnie Hunt and Elaine Arata	April 7, 1996	10.3
12	"Queen of Hearts"	N/A	N/A	Unaired	N/A
13	"The Bermuda Triangle"	N/A	N/A	Unaired	N/A

== Reception ==
Kirk Nicewonger called the show "daring" in his review for United Feature Syndicate, he stated the show "has the nerve to shrug off the joke-every-seven-seconds sitcom straitjacket, and it recreates the way people really speak". He noted how the characters "interrupt each other, and step on one another's lines, creating a naturalistic, almost improvisational atmosphere that works brilliantly". Frazier Moore wrote for the Associated Press that the show is about "friends, faith and cutting the other guy a little slack", and as a result, the show is a "charming sitcom free of sarcasm, breast jokes, insults, gags, meanness and goofballs pretending to be people".
