= Tom Virtue =

American actor (born 1957)

- Born: November 19, 1957 (age 68); Sherman, Texas, U.S.
- Occupation: Actor
- Years active: 1979–present

Tom Virtue (born November 19, 1957) is an American actor. He is known for his roles in the television series Even Stevens (2000–2003) and The Secret Life of the American Teenager (2008–2013).

== Filmography ==
=== Film ===
Year	Title	Role	Notes
1982	Tex	Bob Collins	
1993	Public Enemy Number Two	Prison Guard	
1999	The Big Day	Tom	
2000	Return to Me	Dr. Senderak	
2000	Joseph: King of Dreams	Reuben	Voice
2003	Detonator	Fred Bizzert	
2004	Hair Show	Agent Scott	
2005	Kicking & Screaming	Track & Field Coach	
2007	Blades of Glory	Floor Manager	
2007	Fracture	Attorney Apley	
2007	Trust Me	Basil Fogarty	
2008	Turok: Son of Stone	Old Man	Voice
2009	The Ugly Truth	Balloon Pilot	
2009	Extract	Guitar Customer	
2011	Transformers: Dark of the Moon	Black Ops NASA Technician (1969)	
2011	Night Sights	Secretary Striling	
2012	Hitchcock	NY Theater Manager	
2012	The Guilt Trip	Mature Singles Man	
2012	Boogie Town	Deputy Chief	
2013	Iron Man 3	Thomas Richards	
2013	The Levenger Tapes	Gallagher	
2014	A Haunted House 2	Father Callahan	
2014	Pretty Perfect	Sam	
2015	The Wedding Ringer	Father at Wedding	
2015	Broken Horses	Priest #1	
2015	Flipped	Elderly Man on Telephone	
2016	Izzie's Way Home	Harold	Voice
2016	Live by Night	Doctor	
2018	Green Book	Morgan Anderson	
2018	The Thinning: New World Order	News Anchor	
2019	Plus One	Officiant	
2020	Blindfire	Mr. Smith	
2021	No Man of God	Agent Strauss	
2021	Another Girl	TV Preacher	Voice
2022	To Leslie	Leslie's Father Raymond	
2022	America's Family	Judge Williams	
2022	Trust	Mark Stanley	
2023	Boston Strangler	Radio Newsman	Voice
2023	Big George Foreman	Johnny Carson	
2023	Love Virtually	Richard	
2024	Pa	Arthur Stevenson	
2024	The Demon Detective	Mort Lewis	

=== Television ===
Year	Title	Role	Episode(s)
1982	King's Crossing	Student	"Friday's Child"
1989	21 Jump Street	Caller	"Next Victim"
1989	Roseanne	Jostled drinker	"Lobocop"
1990	Newhart	Father John	"Georgie and Grace"
1990	Grand	Jimmy	"The Healing"
1991	Seeds of Tragedy	Policeman	Television movie
1991	Nurses	John Doe	"Reversal of Grandpa"
1991	L.A. Law	Rick Nash	"Spleen it to me, Lucy"
1991	The Fresh Prince of Bel-Air	Forest Ranger	"Christmas Show"
1992	Baby Talk	Reverend Newman	"Scenes from a Marriage"
1992	Majority Rule	New Hampshire Reporter	Television movie
1993	The Fresh Prince of Bel-Air	Cop	"Robbing the Banks"
1993	Basic Values: Sex, Shock & Censorship in the 90s	Actor	Television movie
1993	The Building	Stanley	5 episodes
1994	Walker, Texas Ranger	Professor Peter Needham	"Something in the Shadows, Part 1 and 2"
1995	Lois & Clark: The New Adventures of Superman	Michael DeSanto	"Top Copy"
1995	Pride & Joy	Clown	"Pilot"
1995–1996	Bonnie	Tom Vandoozer	12 episodes
1995–2001	Star Trek: Voyager	Supervisor / Lieutenant Walter Baxter	4 episodes
1996	Coach	Doctor	"Sleepless in Orlando"
1996	For My Daughter's Honor	Principal Arnet	Television movie
1996–2000	Pacific Blue	Todd / Prosecutor	2 episodes
1997–2000	Beverly Hills, 90210	Marcus Behr / Mr. Cummings	3 episodes
1997	Murphy Brown	Nurse Bruce	"Who Do You Truss?"
1997	Ally McBeal	Ally's father	"Pilot"
1997	The Secret World of Alex Mack	Big Lou	"Driving"
1997	Under Wraps	Movie Dad	Television movie
1997	Team Knight Rider	Gage Weigert	"Oil & Water"
1997–1998	Nash Bridges	Victor Mott/Dan Buelow	2 episodes
1998	Working	Mr. Atkinson	"Equality"
1998	Chicago Hope	Mitch Burgess	"Risky Business"
1998	Brink!	Science teacher	Television movie
1998	The Secret Lives of Men	Brad	"Dating is Hell"
1998	Party of Five	Priest	"One Christmas, to Go"
1999	The Darwin Conspiracy	Dr. Jim Meyer	Television movie
1999	Dharma & Greg	Mr. Miller	"Dharma & Greg on a Hot Tin Roof"
1999	The X-Files	David Kline	"Arcadia"
1999	Martial Law	Cyril Morton	"Nitro Man"
1999	Introducing Dorothy Dandridge	Miami comic	Television movie
1999	Horse Sense	Investment banker	Television movie
2000	7th Heaven	Juror #12	"Twelve Angry People"
2000	Malibu, CA	Dr. Jamison	"Dr. Freeze"
2000	Freaks and Geeks	Mr. Sampson	2 episodes
2000	Miracle in Lane 2	Announcer	Television movie
2000	Sabrina the Teenage Witch	Mr. Cavanaugh	"Sabrina's Perfect Christmas"
2000–2003	Even Stevens	Steve Stevens	65 episodes
2000–2004	Malcolm in the Middle	Peter Dietrich / Priest	2 episodes
2000–2004	As Told by Ginger	Jonas Foultey (voice)	7 episodes
2002	The Agency	Jim Berman	"The Enemy Within"
2002	Grounded for Life	Father Matthew	"Swearin' to God"
2002	Firefly	Pompous doctor	"Ariel"
2002	JAG	Warrant Officer Scoggins	"All Ye Faithful"
2002–2003	Life with Bonnie	Dr. 'Mr.' Casey	3 episodes
2003	Mister Sterling	Senator Bowles	2 episodes
2003	The Even Stevens Movie	Steve Stevens	Television movie
2003	Monk	Other coach	"Mr. Monk Goes to the Ballgame"
2003	Nip/Tuck	FBI Agent	"Escobar Gallardo"
2003–2009	CSI: Crime Scene Investigation	George / Doctor	2 episodes
2004	Reba	Coach Class	"All Growed Up"
2004	Six Feet Under	Edward Gorodetsky	"Bomb Shelter"
2004	That's So Raven	Dr. Horn	"Numb and Numb-er"
2004	Crossing Jordan	Saunders	"Out of Sight"
2004	Wanda Does It	Referee	"Wanda Does the Sky"
2004	Desperate Housewives	Man	"Come Back to Me"
2005	Arrested Development	Car Salesman	"Queen for a Day"
2005	Charmed	Angry Man	"Charmegeddon"
2005	Unscripted	Support Group Testimonial	Episode 8
2005	Barbershop	Debate Moderator	"Debates and Dead People"
2005	Everwood	Juilillard Administrator	"Fallout"
2005	The King of Queens	Mr. Landry	"Slippery Slope"
2005	Curb Your Enthusiasm	Man With Stutter	"The Bowtie"
2005	Criminal Minds	Gil Clurman	"Won't Get Fooled Again"
2005	Over There	Major Doten	"Orphans"
2005	The Comeback	Eddie	7 episodes
2005–2007	Days of Our Lives	Professor Walter Brauer / Lt. Bilbo	5 episodes
2006	Cold Case	Matthew - 1968	"Debut"
2006	What About Brian	Law Firm Partner	"Moving Day"
2006	Pepper Dennis	Neurologist Dr. Pancholy	"True Love Is Dead"
2006	Read It and Weep	Ralph Bartlett	Television movie
2006	The Closer	Mr. Nelson	"No Good Deed"
2006	Justice	Donald Payne	"Crucified"
2006	Four Kings	Tyler's Other Dad	"Upper West Side Story"
2006	Everybody Hates Chris	Dr With Kidney	"Everybody Hates Kris"
2006	My Boys	Cubs Owner	"Superstar Treatment"
2007	Drake & Josh	Mr. Roland	2 episodes
2007	Shark	Larry Reiner	"Scarlet Fever"
2007	Studio 60 on the Sunset Strip	Reporter	"K&R: Part 2"
2007	Side Order of Life	Eddie	"Pilot"
2007	Entourage	Pilot	"No Cannes Do"
2007	State of Mind	Mr. Pfeiffer	"O Rose, Thou Art Stick"
2007	Life	Fire Chief	"Let Her Go"
2007	Boston Legal	Father Tulley	"Hope and Glory"
2007	Bones	Dr. Ted Readron	"Intern in the Incinerator"
2007	A Grandpa for Christmas	George Rogers	Television movie
2007–2010	The Sarah Silverman Program	Mayor Wittels	2 episodes
2008	CSI: Miami	Richard Cyrus	"Tunnel Vision"
2008	Brothers & Sisters	Dr. Bob Feldman	"Moral Hazzard"
2008	Out of Jimmy's Head	Main Judge	"Bad Fad"
2008	Mind of Mencia	Blue State Dad	"Episode 4.9"
2008	The Mentalist	George Palmer	"Redwood"
2008–2013	The Secret Life of the American Teenager	Reverend Stone	20 episodes
2009	Eleventh Hour	Surgeon	"Miracle"
2009	The Young and the Restless	Judge Henry Alridge	2 episodes
2009	ER	Pares	"Old Times"
2010	Big Love	TV Moderator	"End of Days"
2010	Southland	Russell's Doctor	"U-Boat"
2010	Important Things with Demetri Martin	Group Leader	"Space"
2010	Class	Hennesy	Television movie
2010	How I Met Your Mother	Minister	"The Wedding Bride"
2010	Sons of Anarchy	Doctor	"Home"
2010	It's Always Sunny in Philadelphia	Rink Official	"Mac's Big Break"
2010	Private Practice	Dr. Warren	"Playing God"
2010	Gigantic	Movie Director	2 episodes
2010	90210	Mr. Bergman	"I See London... I See France..."
2010	Law & Order: LA	Rogan Malone	"Ballona Creek"
2010	Victorious	Joey Ferguson	"Freak the Freak Out"
2010–2014	Two and a Half Men	Stan / Freddy The Minister	2 episodes
2011	The Defenders	Plainclothes Detective	"Nevada v. Wayne"
2011	General Hospital	Minister	3 episodes
2011	Castle	Judge Fitz	"Law & Murder"
2011	Workaholics	Client	"The Promotion"
2011	Hawthorne	Wayne Staab	"Just Between Friends"
2011	Wilfred	Doctor	"Conscience"
2011	Big Time Rush	Wedding Guest	"Big Time Wedding"
2011	Free Agents	Fred Potter	"Rebranding"
2011	The Office	Squash Player	"Doomsday"
2011	Love's Christmas Journey	Mr. Bersen	Television movie
2012	Luck	Track Reporter	"Ace Counters Smythe's Moves with His Own"
2012	NCIS	Frank Satner	"The Tell"
2012	Children's Hospital	Dr. Random	"Chief's Origin"
2012	The First Family	General Alexander	"Pilot"
2012	The Mindy Project	Coach	"Teen Patient"
2012	Up All Night	Minister	"The Wedding"
2012	The 404	Pilot	Television movie
2013	Newsreaders	Lawyer	"Hedge Fun"
2013	The Goodwin Games	Professor #2	"Hamletta"
2013	Perception	Doctor	"Alienation"
2013	Little Horribles	Dad	"Minibar"
2013	The Neighbors	Dr. Cohan	"The One with the Interspecies F-R-I-E-N-D-S"
2013	Deadtime Stories	Teacher	"Revenge of the Goblins"
2013	Revenge	Doctor	"Mercy"
2013–2019	American Horror Story	Priest / Principal Johnson / Reporter #1	3 episodes
2014	Enlisted	Officer	"Pilot"
2014	Hart of Dixie	Dean Hale	"Here You Come Again"
2014	Jennifer Falls	Brian Driscoll	"Staycation"
2014	The Other Half	Des's Father	"Dysfunctional Family"
2014	Ray Donovan	Bartender	"Sunny"
2014	You're the Worst	Fake Dad	"Finish Your Milk"
2014	Franklin & Bash	Madison's Lawyer	"Deep Throat"
2015	The Comedians	Supermarket Manager	"The Red Carpet"
2016	Confirmation	Patrick Leahy	Television movie
2017	Incorporated	David Ciarian Miles	"Executables"
2017	Crazy Ex-Girlfriend	Judge	"Can Josh Take a Leap of Faith?"
2017	Agents of S.H.I.E.L.D.	Motel Clerk	"BOOM"
2017	Throwing Shade	Standing Man	Episode 6
2017	I'm Dying Up Here	Joe	"Lingchi"
2017–2021	Conan	Hindsight Financial - Advisor #1 / ElevatoRevelations Guy / Radioshack Salesman	Multiple episodes
2017–2020	This Is Us	Dr. Grader	2 episodes
2018	Timeless	Senator James Wadsworth	"Mrs. Sherlock Holmes"
2018	Animal Kingdom	Charles	"Homecoming"
2018	To Tell the Truth	Impostor	"Margaret Cho/Tony Hale/Justin Baldoni/Ron Funches"
2018	9-1-1	Tire Store Employee	"Under Pressure"
2018	Coop & Cami Ask the World	Coach Zappalla	"Would You Rather Be the Principal's BFF?"
2019	Dead to Me	Doug	"I Can Handle It"
2019	Atypical	Director of Student Conduct	"Only Tweed"
2020	Danger Force	C-SPAN Host	"Mime Games"
2020	Dirty John	Father David	"Marriage Encounter"
2020	Mom	Waiter	"Smitten Kitten and a Tiny Boo-Boo Error"
2021	Mr. Mayor	Location Manager	"#PalmTreeReform"
2021	Good Girls	Middle Aged Golfer	"Broken Toys"
2022	NCIS: Los Angeles	Dr. Hodge	"Where Loyalties Lie"
2022	Procopio Compliance Training	Ignorant Employee	Multiple Segments
2022	S.W.A.T.	Surgeon	"Short Fuse"
2022	Physical	Real Estate Investor	"Don't You Ever Stop"
2022	Dahmer – Monster: The Jeffrey Dahmer Story	Father Hecker	"The Bogeyman"
2023	Grand Crew	Doctor	"Wine & Traffic"
2023–2024	Unprisoned	Pastor Nelson	2 episodes
2024	Young Sheldon	Father Donovan	"Baptists, Catholics and an Attempted Drowning"
2024	Grotesquerie	Bill	3 episodes
2025	High Potential	Catholic Priest	"Chutes and Murders"
2025	Shifting Gears	Rich Troll	"Career"
2025	Georgie & Mandy's First Marriage	Father Donovan	Episode: "Guilt Boots"
2026	The Rookie	Judge Lawrence Hunt	2 episodes

=== Video games ===
Year	Title	Role
2009	Red Faction Guerrilla	General Bertram Roth
2010	Mafia II	O.P.A. Guard 1
2010	Yogi Bear: The Video Game	Boo-Boo Bear, Male Camper 1
2021	Resident Evil Village	Grigori
