= Maniac Mansion (TV series) =

1990 Canadian American television sitcom

- Genre: Sitcom
- Created by: Eugene Levy; Michael Short; John Hemphill; Paul Flanerty
- Based on: Maniac Mansion by Ron Gilbert and Gary Winnick
- Developed by: Cliff Ruby; Elana Lesser; Bob Carrau
- Starring: Joe Flaherty; Deborah Theaker; Kathleen Robertson; Avi Phillips; George Buza
- Opening theme: "Maniac Mansion" - sung by Jane Siberry, composed by Lou Natale
- Countries of origin: Canada; United States
- Original language: English
- No. of seasons: 3
- No. of episodes: 66

Production
- Executive producers: Peter Sussman; Eugene Levy; Barry Jossen
- Producer: Jamie Paul Rock
- Running time: 30 minutes (including commercials)
- Production companies: Lucasfilm Ltd. Television (Note: This was the first live-action television series produced by the studio.); Atlantis Films

Original release
- Network: YTV (Canada); The Family Channel (U.S.)
- Release: September 14, 1990 – April 4, 1993

Maniac Mansion is a sitcom co-created by Eugene Levy that aired concurrently on YTV in Canada and the Family Channel in the US for three seasons from September 14, 1990, to April 4, 1993. It was loosely based on the 1987 video game Maniac Mansion by Lucasfilm Games. While Lucasfilm served as co-producers on the series, the show has little in common with its source material.

== Overview ==
Maniac Mansion centers around the lives of the Edisons, an American family living in a large mansion in the upscale suburban neighborhood of Cedar Springs. The Edisons consist of patriarch Fred (Joe Flaherty), an eccentric scientist and inventor, his level-headed wife Casey (Deborah Theaker), and their children, teenage genius Tina (Kathleen Robertson), stubborn preadolescent Ike (Avi Phillips) and precocious toddler Turner (George Buza). Also living in the Edisons' mansion are Casey's brother Harry Orca (John Hemphill) and his wife Idella Muckle-Orca (Mary Charlotte-Wilcox).

While Maniac Mansion primarily derives its storylines from typical sitcom fare, such as family life and parent-child relationships, the series also incorporates elements of science fiction. Fred Edison is a scientist who works out of his basement laboratory, which is partially powered by a mysterious extraterrestrial meteorite, and many episodes revolve around Fred's outlandish and occasionally disastrous experiments and inventions. As revealed in the series premiere, a mishap with one of these inventions caused genetic mutations in two of the main characters, Turner Edison and Harry Orca: for much of the series, toddler Turner is a fully-grown man with the mind of a child, while Harry is a normal-sized housefly with a human head (similar to the original 1958 version of The Fly).

Sharing with all of the writers and performers with the 1976–1984 Canadian sketch comedy series Second City Television, Maniac Mansion has a very similar style of humor, featuring much of the dry wit and cultural satire typical of SCTV, ranging from pop culture references to film and television parodies. A particular staple of Maniac Mansion's comedic style is the series' pervasive tendency to break the fourth wall, with characters – usually Harry – addressing the audience to comment on the episode. Meta-referential humor is also a regular element of the show: a few episodes are presented as "behind-the-scenes" documentaries, depicting the Edisons as an actual family starring in a sitcom based on their lives.

== Cast and characters ==
=== Main ===
- Joe Flaherty as Dr. Fred Edison, a devoted father and absent-minded scientist.
- Deborah Theaker as Casey Edison, Fred's loving wife.
- Kathleen Robertson as Tina Edison, a popular but brilliant teenage girl who assists Fred in his laboratory.
- Avi Phillips as Ike Edison, an average and slightly rebellious preteen boy.
- George Buza as Turner Edison, a toddler rapidly aged into a huge balding adult body following a scientific accident.
- John Hemphill as Harry Orca, a.k.a. Harry the Fly, Casey's brother who was transformed into a half-man, half-housefly mutant in the same accident which changed Turner.
- Mary Charlotte Wilcox as Idella Muckle-Orca, Harry's neurotic wife.

=== Recurring ===
- Colin Fox as Dr. Edward Edison, a respected scientist and Fred's father.
- Mark Wilson, Wendy Hopkins and Patrick Gillen as Richard, Allasyn and Keifer Pratt, the Edisons' snooty yuppie neighbors.

=== Guest stars ===
- José Ferrer as himself ("The Celebrity Visitor")
- Teri Austin as herself ("Lenny...One Amour Time" and "Lenny...One Amour Time: Part 2")
- Dave Thomas as Hudgie DeRubertis ("Buried by the Mob")
- Martin Short as Eddie O'Donnell ("Down and Out in Cedar Springs")
- David Cronenberg as himself ("Idella's Breakdown")
- Andrea Martin as Dr. Fontana Blue ("Idella's Breakdown")
- Jayne Eastwood as various characters
- Dewey Robertson as The Atomizer ("Wrestling with the Truth")
- Eugene Levy as Doc Ellis ("Freddy had a Little Lamb")
- Jan Rubeš as Uncle Joe ("It Ain't Over 'Til Uncle Joe Sings")

== Development and production ==
In a special printed in the Summer 1990 issue of The Lucasfilm Fan Club magazine, the initial conception of an episodic television series based on Maniac Mansion is credited to Lucasfilm animators Cliff Ruby and Elana Lasser, who pitched the idea to George Lucas. Convinced of the project's potential, Lucas contacted Toronto-based Atlantis Films to help him produce the series. (Note: Lucas was not credited for his involvement in the series, making it one of the few Lucasfilm productions to have this distinction prior to Disney's 2012 acquisition of the studio.)

Atlantis enlisted comedian and former Second City Television writer/performer Eugene Levy to spearhead the development of the series. Initially pitched as a more overtly horror/sci fi-themed comedy akin to The Addams Family or The Munsters, Levy ultimately rejected this approach, recruiting a number of The Second City alumni and again working on Maniac Mansion from the ground up into the more light-hearted and slightly surreal series it finally became.

Shot entirely in Toronto, Maniac Mansion premiered on September 14, 1990 on the Family Channel in the United States, and September 17 on YTV in Canada. The series lasted for three seasons and 66 episodes before its cancellation in 1993. The series continued to air in syndication on The Family Channel until 1994, on YTV until 1997, and on Showcase until 2002.

=== SCTV connections ===
A large portion of Maniac Mansion's cast and crew consisted of alumni from the Toronto comedy troupe The Second City, as well as its 1976-1984 television offshoot Second City Television. In a 1990 Time article, writer Richard Zoglin took note of the two shows' similar comedic styles, stating: "Maniac Mansion has the old SCTV spirit, mixing the outrageous and the banal with nary a hint that anybody knows the difference." In a 1992 article visiting the set of the series, Entertainment Weekly likewise compared it to an SCTV convention: "The place is packed with veterans of the ... series: There are former SCTV actors, writers, directors, key grips—even Mansion's makeup artist is an old SCTVer".

Series' co-creator Eugene Levy was an original cast member and writer on Second City Television. Levy developed Maniac Mansion along with fellow Second City writers Michael Short, Paul Flaherty (Note: Joe Flaherty's brother) and David Flaherty, as well as director Jamie Paul Rock. Additional writing was often contributed by Second City member Paul Wildman, as well as cast members Joe Flaherty, John Hemphill and Mary-Charlotte Wilcox. The series' theme music was co-written by Mary Margaret O'Hara. (Note: Catherine O'Hara's sister)

Additionally, most of the show's main cast members (with the exceptions of then-young actors Kathleen Robertson and Avi Phillips) were veterans of The Second City. Joe Flaherty was one of the founders of Toronto's Second City and an original SCTV cast member, while John Hemphill and Mary-Charlotte Wilcox were supporting players and writers in its later seasons; George Buza also appeared as an extra in one episode. Deborah Theaker, while having had no involvement with SCTV, was a former member of The Second City stage show.

As a result of these connections, there are naturally numerous SCTV references throughout the series. Eugene Levy, Martin Short, Dave Thomas and Andrea Martin all made guest appearances on the show, as did minor players Juul Haalmeyer, Tony Rosato and Robin Duke. A few jokes are reused from the series, and in certain episodes, the characters of Count Floyd and Happy Marsden can be seen playing on television sets in the background.

== Episodes ==
This episode list was compiled from the United States Copyright Office database.

=== Season 1 (1990–91) ===
No. overall	No. in season	Title	Directed by	Written by	Original release date
1	1	"The 10th Anniversary Special"	John Bell	John Hemphill & David Flaherty & Eugene Levy	September 14, 1990
2	2	"Flystruck (a.k.a. The Trouble with Harry)"	Bruce Pittman	Eugene Levy, John Hemphill	September 21, 1990
3	3	"Trapped Like Rats"	John Bell	Story by : John Hemphill, Don Lake; Teleplay by : Eugene Levy & Michael Short	September 28, 1990
4	4	"Love Thy Neighbour"	Bruce Pittman	Michael Short & Eugene Levy	October 4, 1990
5	5	"Fred's a-Courtin'"	John Bell	John Hemphill, David Flaherty, Eugene Levy	October 12, 1990
6	6	"The Sandman Cometh"	Bruce Pittman	John Hemphill, David Flaherty, Eugene Levy	October 19, 1990
7	7	"Good on Ya"	John Bell	John Hemphill, David Flaherty, Eugene Levy	October 26, 1990
8	8	"Bring Me Harry Orca"	Bruce Pittman	Michael Short, David Flaherty, Eugene Levy	November 2, 1990
9	9	"Dad's Bummed Out"	John Bell	Story by : Paul Flaherty, Michael Short, John Hemphill; Teleplay by : Paul Flaherty, Michael Short	November 11, 1990
10	10	"Webs, the Really Tangled Kind"	Bruce Pittman	Lyons N. Wells, Michael Short	November 16, 1990
11	11	"National Security Risk"	John Bell	Jamie Tatham, Chuck Tatham, Michael Short	November 25, 1990
12	12	"A Little Old Time Jazz"	Bruce Pittman	John Hemphill, David Flaherty	December 2, 1990
13	13	"Hawaii Blues"	John Bell	Story by : Jaime Tatham, Chuck Tatham; Teleplay by : Lyons N. Wells & Michael Short	December 9, 1990
14	14	"Good Cheer on Ya"	Bruce Pittman	John Hemphill, David Flaherty	December 16, 1990
15	15	"Brainiac Mansion"	Stephen Surjik	Lyons N. Wells, Michael Short	December 30, 1990
16	16	"Little Big Fly"	Bruce Pittman	Story by : Michael Short, Peter Wildman; Teleplay by : Lyons N. Wells, John Hemphill, David Flaherty	January 6, 1991
17	17	"Money Dearest"	Stephen Surjik	Story by : Michael Short, Joe Flaherty; Teleplay by : Michael Short, David Flaherty	January 13, 1991
18	18	"Turner: The Boss"	Bruce Pittman	Michael Short, David Flaherty	January 20, 1991
19	19	"The Case of the Broken Record"	John Bell	Lyons N. Wells, Tom Nursall, Michael Short	February 3, 1991
20	20	"The Live Show"	Bruce Pittman	John Hemphill, David Flaherty	February 17, 1991
21	21	"Tina's Excellent Adventure"	Joe Flaherty	Joe Flaherty, Deborah Theaker	February 24, 1991
22	22	"The Cliffhanger"	Bruce Pittman	Lyons N. Wells & Michael Short	March 17, 1991

=== Season 2 (1991–92) ===
No. overall	No. in season	Title	Directed by	Written by	Original release date
23	1	"Luck Be a Lady This Season"	Joe Flaherty	David Flaherty, John Hemphill, Michael Short	September 4, 1991
24	2	"The New Look"	John Bell	David Flaherty, Michael Short, John Hemphill	September 11, 1991
25	3	"Late Night Harry"	Stan Harris	Michael Short	September 18, 1991
26	4	"Turner, the Rebellious Years"	John Bell	Michael Short, Lyons N. Wells	September 25, 1991
27	5	"Man and Machine"	Stan Harris	Tom Nursall, David Flaherty	October 2, 1991
28	6	"Driving Ms. Idella"	John Bell	Deborah Divine, Mary Charlotte Wilcox	October 9, 1991
29	7	"Ugly Like Me"	Dug Rotstein	David Flaherty, John Hemphill	October 16, 1991
30	8	"The Celebrity Visitor"	Perry Rosemond	Michael Short	October 23, 1991
31	9	"The Attack of Killer Keifer"	Perry Rosemond	Tom Nursall, John Hemphill	October 30, 1991
32	10	"Lenny... One Amour Time: Part 1"	John Bell	David Flaherty, John Hemphill	November 6, 1991
33	11	"Lenny... One Amour Time: Part 2"	John Bell	David Flaherty, John Hemphill	November 13, 1991
34	12	"A Hateful of Brain"	John Bell	Michael Short	November 20, 1991
35	13	"Buried by the Mob"	Perry Rosemond	Dave Thomas	November 27, 1991
36	14	"Down and Out in Cedar Springs"	Perry Rosemond	Joe Flaherty	December 18, 1991
37	15	"Misery Loves Company"	John Bell	Michael Short	February 12, 1992
38	16	"Ike's Got it Bad...Real Bad"	John Bell	David Flaherty, John Hemphill	February 19, 1992
39	17	"Turnerator Too"	John Bell	Michael Short	February 26, 1992
40	18	"Baby Heat"	Perry Rosemond	Deborah Divine	March 4, 1992
41	19	"Streetcar Named Idella"	John Hemphill	David Flaherty, John Hemphill	March 18, 1992
42	20	"Turner's Imaginary Friend"	Perry Rosemond	Alan Templeton, Mary Crawford	March 25, 1992
43	21	"Idella's Breakdown"	Dug Rotstein	Michael Short	April 1, 1992
44	22	"Sophisticated Lady"	Joe Flaherty	Joe Flaherty	April 8, 1992

=== Season 3 (1992–93) ===
No. overall	No. in season	Title	Directed by	Written by	Original release date
45	1	"The Long Hot Mansion"	Joe Flaherty	Michael Short, David Flaherty	September 7, 1992
46	2	"Raging Lenny"	Perry Rosemond	David Flaherty & John Hemphill	September 14, 1992
47	3	"College Days"	John Paizs	Michael Short	September 21, 1992
48	4	"The Prince's Broad"	Perry Rosemond	David Flaherty, John Hemphill	September 28, 1992
49	5	"Ike's Black Eye"	John Paizs	Alan Templeton, Mary Crawford	October 5, 1992
50	6	"Science is Only Skin Deep"	Perry Rosemond	Norm Hiscock, Frank van Keeken	October 19, 1992
51	7	"Ike's New Buddy"	Eugene Levy	Deborah Divine, Nancy Dolman	October 26, 1992
52	8	"As the Worm Turns"	Perry Rosemond	Tom Nursall	November 2, 1992
53	9	"Cape Scary"	Joe Flaherty	David Flaherty, Joe Flaherty	November 9, 1992
54	10	"Wrestling with the Truth"	Perry Rosemond	Norm Hiscock, Frank van Keeken	November 16, 1992
55	11	"The Science Fair"	Stacey Stewart Curtis	Rob Gfroerer, Paul Greenberg, Nick McKinney, Vito Viscomi	November 23, 1992
56	12	"Love, Turner Style"	Dug Rotstein	Michael Short, Dave Flaherty	November 30, 1992
57	13	"Atoms Gone Wild"	John Hemphill	David Flaherty, John Hemphill	January 25, 1993
58	14	"Walter Under the Bridge"	Perry Rosemond	Deborah Divine	February 1, 1993
59	15	"Tina and the Teardrops"	Joe Flaherty	Michael Short	February 8, 1993
60	16	"Ike for President"	Perry Rosemond	Mary Charlotte Wilcox	February 15, 1993
61	17	"Freddie Had a Little Lamb"	Perry Rosemond	Michael Short	February 22, 1993
62	18	"Idella's New Career"	Eugene Levy	David Flaherty, John Hemphill	March 7, 1993
63	19	"Love Letters"	Perry Rosemond	Deborah Theaker	March 14, 1993
64	20	"It Ain't Over 'Til Uncle Joe Sings"	Joe Flaherty	Joe Flaherty	March 21, 1993
65	21	"Uncle Harry Ain't Feeling So Good"	John Hemphill	David Flaherty, John Hemphill	March 28, 1993
66	22	"The Way We Was"	Eugene Levy	David Flaherty, Michael Short	April 4, 1993

== Home video ==
Certain episodes from the first season were released on VHS:

- In 1991, HRS Funai released a four-episode tape simply titled "マニアック・マンション" (Note: Literally translates to Maniac Mansion in English) in Japan, featuring "The 10th Anniversary Special", "Webs, The Really Tangled Kind", "Good Cheer On Ya", and "The Cliffhanger"; all episodes retained their original English audio but featured Japanese subtitles.
- In 1992, Family Channel Video released a two-episode tape titled "Maniac Mansion: The Love Collection" in the United States, featuring the romance-themed episodes "Flystruck" and "Fred's A-Courtin'".

The series has never been released on other formats such as DVD, Blu-ray, nor streaming/digital purchase.

== Critical reception ==
Maniac Mansion received generally positive reviews from professional critics during its initial run. In a press release for the series, Time called it "the looniest, sweetest family comedy of the year", listing it as one of the best shows of 1990. Entertainment Weekly called it "100-proof hilarious". In a 1990 article on the series, The Los Angeles Times described the show as "a stylized, sharp-edged comedy that's a bit like David Lynch on helium".

However, response from the gaming community, especially fans of the original Maniac Mansion and graphic adventure games in general, has been mixed. In a 2011 retrospective review, PC Gamer offered a predominantly negative opinion, noting the series "has roughly as much to do with the original game as a chipmunk's arsehole resembles Sweden" and calling the two episodes they had seen "comedy vacuums" and "at best generic and at worst, awful"; however, they admitted that they could not conclusively judge the entire series on so few episodes. The International House of Mojo, a website devoted to LucasArts video games, also lamented its various dissimilarities to the game. However, they believed that the series "deserves the courtesy of a second look", calling it "surprisingly sweet-natured" and noting that the science fiction elements and "off-beat brand of humor" gave an otherwise typical sitcom a unique personality.

== Awards and nominations ==
Maniac Mansion was nominated for and won several television awards during the series' run:

CableACE Awards
Year	Award	Result
1993	Direction of Photography and/or Lighting Direction in a Comedy or Dramatic Series – Raymond Brounstein (director of photography)	Won
1993	Original Song – Michael Short, Louis Natale, Ryan Lord (For the song "Baby Rap" in episode "Baby Heat")	Nominated

Gemini Awards
Year	Award	Result
1992	Best Picture Editing in a Comedy, Variety or Performing Arts Program or Series – Stephan Fanfara	Won
1992	Best Comedy Program or Series – Eugene Levy, Seaton McLean, Jamie Paul Rock, Peter Sussman, Michael Short	Nominated
1992	Best Performance in a Comedy Program or Series (Individual or Ensemble) – George Buza	Nominated
1992	Best Sound in a Comedy, Variety or Performing Arts Program or Series – Allen Ormerod, Tom Mather, David Evans (For episode "Dads Bummed Out")	Nominated
1992	Best Writing in a Comedy or Variety Program or Series – Eugene Levy, Michael Short, David Flaherty	Nominated
1993	Best Comedy Program or Series – Jamie Paul Rock, Michael Short, Eugene Levy, Peter Sussman, Barry Jossen	Nominated
1993	Best Guest Performance in a Series by an Actor or Actress – Martin Short	Nominated
1994	Best Comedy Program or Series – Peter Sussman, Jamie Paul Rock, Eugene Levy, Seaton McLean, Michael Short	Nominated
1994	Best Writing in a Comedy or Variety Program or Series – Michael Short	Nominated

Young Artist Award
Year	Award	Result
1991	Best Young Actor Co-starring in an Off-Primetime Series – Avi Phillips	Nominated
1991	Best Young Actress Co-starring in an Off-Primetime Series – Kathleen Robertson	Nominated
1992	Best Young Actor Co-starring in an Off-Primetime Series – Avi Phillips	Nominated
1992	Best Young Actress Co-starring in an Off-Primetime Series – Kathleen Robertson	Nominated
1993	Best Young Actor Starring in a Cable Series – Avi Phillips	Nominated

== Differences from the game ==
While ostensibly an adaptation of the eponymous 1987 computer game, Maniac Mansion shares various superficial similarities with its source material, but is vastly different in terms of plot, tone and characterization.

The premise of the game (an homage to horror and sci-fi B movies) follows a group of teenagers who venture into a dilapidated mansion to rescue their kidnapped friend. The mansion is inhabited by the homicidal Edison family, consisting of Dr. Fred, a deranged scientist who is possessed by an evil meteorite, his wife Edna, an erotic-starved sadomasochistic nurse, their son Weird Ed, a paranoid paramilitary survivalist, and their pets Green Tentacle and Purple Tentacle, a pair of sentient, ambulatory tentacles.

Whereas the television series was produced for a family audience, the tone of the game was decidedly more adult, featuring raunchy black comedy and surreal violence, as well as LucasArts' traditional style of offbeat humor and slapstick, which was entirely omitted from the television adaptation. The game's original characters are also completely absent from the series, with the notable exception of Dr. Fred Edison, whose character was drastically altered from an insane antagonist with a balding, elderly appearance in the game to a clumsy but good-natured family man in his forties in the television show.

The most overt thematic connection the series had to the game was the setting of a mansion housing an extraterrestrial meteor. The meteor itself is seldom referenced in the show, although it is prominently featured in the opening credits of the first season via an expository newspaper clipping, revealing it to have been discovered underneath the mansion by Fred's grandfather Louis Edison. Throughout the series, Fred can be seen conducting several experiments by either harnessing the meteor's supernatural powers, or experimenting on the meteor itself.

Ron Gilbert and Gary Winnick, the designers of the original Maniac Mansion, have never made any public comment on their opinion of the television series, but in Day of the Tentacle, LucasArts' 1993 sequel to Maniac Mansion, the television show serves as a minor plot point in which protagonist Bernard Bernoulli must help collect the royalties that Dr. Fred was promised from a vaguely explained in-universe television series based on the events of the first game.

== See also ==
- Honey, I Shrunk the Kids: The TV Show, a later program with a similar premise, also starring George Buza
