= The Pink Chiquitas =

- Theatrical release poster
- Directed by: Anthony Currie
- Written by: Anthony Currie
- Produced by: Nicolas Stiliadis
- Starring: Frank Stallone; Bruce Pirrie; Elizabeth Edwards; Claudia Udy; John Hemphill
- Cinematography: Nicolas Stiliadis
- Edited by: Stephen Withrow
- Music by: Paul Zaza
- Distributed by: Shapiro Entertainment
- Release date: 1987
- Running time: 83 minutes
- Country: Canada
- Language: English

The Pink Chiquitas is a 1987 Canadian comedy film about a pink meteor that lands near a small town, turning its female residents into nymphomaniacs. The film was directed by Anthony Currie, and stars Frank Stallone, Elizabeth Edwards, and Claudia Udy.

== Plot ==
Tony Mareda, Jr., a former Olympic athlete and world-renowned private detective, is driving across the country when he is attacked by mobsters. Chased to the sleepy backwater town of Beamsville, Tony ducks into the local drive-in theater, where he is followed by his pursuers. As Tony takes out the hit men amidst the parked cars, a pink meteor roars overhead and crashes in the nearby woods.

The meteor's spectacular landing leads the townspeople at the drive-in to rush out in search of it. As the young couples search the woods, however, the women begin to hear a ringing sound coming from the glowing pink rock that turns them into lusty nymphomaniacs. Now under the thrall of the meteor, they protecting it by seducing the men. One of the few who avoids the effect is the local TV weatherman, Clip Bacardi, who, having discovered a small fragment of the meteor, it too engrossed by it to notice the attempts by his temporarily aroused girlfriend, librarian Mary Ann Kowalski, to come on to him.

The next morning, the local authorities discover an empty crater where the meteor landed, with the men who went looking for it in catatonic states scattered throughout the woods. Facing a challenge from Mary Ann in the upcoming election, Beamsville's mayor orders the town deputy to enlist Tony Mareda's help in finding out what happened to the men. When Clip goes on the air that evening with his fragment, however, the sound it emits transforms all of the women watching the broadcast into the meteor's servants. Learning of Tony's investigation, the women seduce a key witness and, under Mary Ann's direction, begin to take control of the town.

Having stumbled into the women's plot, Clip narrowly escapes their takeover of the television station. When he informs the mayor, the men form a posse to hunt for the meteor. As they search the woods, Clip encounters a scantily-clad Mary Ann, who nearly incapacitates him before Tony is able to render her unconscious using chloroform. After placing her in the town jail, Tony and Clip go back into the woods and track the meteor to a cave, where they narrowly escape a group of women who arrive to worship it. When their effort to drive to the next town for help is frustrated by a roadblock, they return to Beamsville to find that the women's takeover of the town is complete, with the remaining men wandering the streets in dazed stupors. Clip attempts to discover how to defeat the meteor by experimenting on the fragment he possesses, but is overcome by the fumes produced after accidentally setting it on fire. Tony is also subdued by a group of women in a pink Sherman tank, who knock him unconscious when they blast apart the town jail where he takes refuge.

Tony is awakened back in the cave by Mary Ann, who announces that the meteor, which she refers to as "Betty," has chosen him to be the father of its offspring. As the meteor draws Tony to it, however, the cave wall to which he is chained collapses and the chamber is flooded with water — the meteor's weakness. After it is washed out of the cave, Tony and Mary Ann (who resists the meteor's influence after seeing Clip being attacked by it) work together to push the pulsating rock into the town lake, destroying it and returning the controlled women to normal.

== Cast ==
- Frank Stallone as Tony Mareda Jr.
- Bruce Pirrie as Clip Bacardi
- Elizabeth Edwards as Mary Ann Kowalski
- Claudia Udy as Helen Walkman
- John Hemphill as Ernie Bodine
- Don Lake as Deputy Barney Drum
- Cindy Valentine as Stella Dumbrowski
- Gerald Isaac as Dwight Wright
- Eartha Kitt as Voice of Betty, The Meteor

== Reception ==
Writing in the Orlando Sentinel, critic Jay Boyar called The Pink Chiquitas "one of those rare movies – like the classic Plan 9 from Outer Space – that's so bad it's almost good. Almost."
