= The Bonnie Hunt Show =

American syndicated talk show (2008–2010)

- Written by: Alice Hunt; Joan Lake; Frances O'Donnell; Esther Wortell; Suzanne Barancik
- Directed by: Shirley Dimich
- Presented by: Bonnie Hunt
- Theme music composer: Diane Pike
- Country of origin: United States
- Original language: English
- No. of seasons: 2
- No. of episodes: 452

Production
- Executive producers: Alice Hunt; Joan Lake; Norma Paratore; Barbara Perler
- Producers: Suzanne Barancik; Linda Boyer; Cathy Brillowski; Roz Crandus; Sheila Monk; Frances O'Donnell; Maybeth Pizzi; Esther Wortell
- Production location: Culver City, California
- Editor: Louise Cole
- Running time: 42 minutes
- Production companies: Bob & Alice Productions; Paramedia; Telepictures Productions

Original release
- Network: Syndication
- Release: September 8, 2008 – May 26, 2010

The Bonnie Hunt Show is an American syndicated talk show hosted by Bonnie Hunt. It premiered on September 8, 2008. The show's second and final season premiered on September 8, 2009.

It was announced on December 7, 2009 that The Bonnie Hunt Show would not return for a third season and its final episode aired on May 26, 2010 with reruns airing through September 3.

== Broadcast history ==
The Bonnie Hunt Show first aired on September 8, 2008. Her first guest was Robin Williams and her first musical guest was Meiko. In 2009, December 15, Kaitlyn Maher from the American television reality show America's Got Talent, performed "Ave Maria" at only 5 years old. This show has the same concept as of other talk shows such as The Ellen DeGeneres Show. The show has a monologue at the beginning of the show and guest interviews or a game throughout the show. The show has cleared in 85% of the US ahead in its launch and sold to 17 of the top 20 markets. The show is taped in Culver City, California. In June 2009, it was announced the show had been renewed for a second season. The show was awarded a Gracie Award for Best Talk Show in 2009. In the show's first season, The Bonnie Hunt Show was nominated for three Daytime Emmy Awards in outstanding achievement in main title and graphic design, outstanding achievement in makeup, and outstanding achievement in hairstyling. The show did not win in any of the three categories, losing to The View. The Bonnie Hunt Show returned for its second season on September 8, 2009. The Bonnie Hunt Show was again nominated for three Daytime Emmy Awards in its second season, including one for best talk show host, which it did not win.

== Segments ==
Bonnie talks to her mom during the Ask Alice segment. In Ask Alice, Bonnie talks about television shows and answers viewer questions. During the segment titled: Mail From You Guys, Bonnie answers viewer e-mail. The show also plays games such as Dr. Know It All in which Bonnie, Don Lake, and an audience member do improvisation. On special occasions, a segment Make It Happen involves audience members learning a dance. In Young People Don't Know Nothin' Bonnie asks questions about past TV shows, singers, and popular topics from the 1980s and earlier to three young audience members. On special occasions, Niecy Nash and Bonnie will perform a parody of The Real Housewives of Atlanta in which Bonnie plays Kim, and Niecy plays NeNe.

== Set design ==
The show's set was a Dean Martin tribute. On the wall were pictures of her dog, Charlie, and more of her family. The guests used many entrances such as the door, the stairs, or the fireman's pole. Bonnie had never gone down the fireman's pole nor the stairs. Instead Bonnie entered through an entrance near her desk.
