= Guarding Tess =

1994 US comedy-drama film by Hugh Wilson

- Theatrical release poster
- Directed by: Hugh Wilson
- Written by: Hugh Wilson; Peter Torokvei
- Produced by: Ned Tanen; Nancy Graham Tanen
- Starring: Shirley MacLaine; Nicolas Cage; Richard Griffiths
- Cinematography: Brian J. Reynolds
- Edited by: Sidney Levin
- Music by: Michael Convertino
- Production company: Channel Films
- Distributed by: TriStar Pictures
- Release date: March 11, 1994
- Running time: 95 minutes
- Country: United States
- Language: English
- Budget: $20 million
- Box office: $31 million

Guarding Tess is a 1994 American comedy-drama film starring Shirley MacLaine and Nicolas Cage, directed by Hugh Wilson. MacLaine plays a fictional former First Lady protected by an entourage of Secret Service agents, led by one whom she continually exasperates (Cage).

The film is set in Somersville, Ohio (in reality Parkton, Maryland) and was nominated for a Golden Globe award in 1995 (Best Performance by an Actress in a Motion Picture – Comedy/Musical: Shirley MacLaine).

== Plot ==
Secret Service agent Doug Chesnic is in charge of a team stationed in Ohio to protect Tess Carlisle, the widow of a former U.S. president. Tess is known for her diplomatic and philanthropic work but seems to regard Doug less as a security officer and more as a domestic servant—not unlike her chauffeur, Earl, or her nurse, Frederick.

Doug's assignment with Tess ends after three years, and he is eager to be given a more challenging assignment. Tess decides that she wants him to stay, so she contacts the president, who extends Doug's assignment for another tour.

Doug regards it as beneath his professional dignity to perform little chores around the house and tells Tess that he will be doing everything by the book. When Doug defies her at the golf course, Tess contacts the president to express her displeasure. The President then chastises him by phone and insists that they all get along.

While attending an opera in Columbus, Ohio, Tess falls asleep. In an effort to wake her up, Tess is startled and her hairpiece falls off and in her face, in front of everyone. She gathers herself in the restroom and insists that she wants to go home. On their way out, she is greeted warmly by the crowd, who gives her applause. Tess, then, states she wants to stay the night there.

On the way home the next day, Doug and the rest of his team stop at a gas station to fill up. While alone in the car with Earl, Tess orders him to drive off, stranding her bodyguards. A humiliated Doug must phone the local sheriff—not for the first time—to be on the lookout for her. Upon Earl’s and Tess’ return (escorted by the local police), Doug fires Earl, but Tess countermands that decision. Doug tells Tess that he quits because she’s not allowing him to do his job. She tries to, unsuccessfully, talk him out of it. Doug reminds her that she can refuse secret service protection any time she wants, then he leaves.

While at home, the president calls Doug again, agitated, telling him Tess is now refusing secret service protection and he wants that remedied immediately. Doug returns to her home, confirming that secret service personnel have been kicked off the premises. He tells his team to stay with her regardless. They follow her to a hospital where, unbeknownst to them, she is being treated for an inoperable brain tumor. She demands that they stay outside.

After returning from a hospital checkup, Tess is excited to learn that her son Barry is coming for a visit. Later, she is disappointed, as her son has come only to ask her to help promote his real estate business ventures. She refuses because it’s clear he only wanted to see her to get permission to use her for name recognition.

Tess later watches old television footage of her husband's funeral, concentrating on a glimpse of Doug among the mourners, overcome with grief. She, then, makes an effort to get on his good side, sharing a drink and a late-night conversation with him. She explains that she is not close to her children, in part due to the awkward upbringing they had as a political family. Morale for the agents improves when Tess tells them that the President will be visiting her late husband's presidential library, but his subsequent cancellation lowers her spirits.

During a day out picnicking, Doug notices that Tess is asleep. He then puts her in the car and while retrieving the chair she was in, Earl takes off again, without Doug. When they don't return that night, Doug and his security detail realize that it was likely that Tess was kidnapped, and they contact the FBI. The investigation reveals that Tess's recent dizzy spells were caused by an inoperable brain tumor, which she mentioned as a passing joke earlier and Doug didn’t take seriously.

The car is found with an unconscious Earl but no Tess. Earl is reported to have small crescent-shaped burns on the back of his neck. When talking with his team, Doug realizes that Tess would fight back with the only weapon at her disposal, the car's cigarette lighter-which makes crescent shaped burns.

Doug and FBI agent Schaeffer question Earl, who gets nervous and defensive when he sees Doug holding the lighter and attempts to frame him for the kidnapping. Furious, Doug threatens to shoot off Earl’s toes until he confesses where Tess is being held, going so far as to shoot one toe. Earl admits that Tess is being held captive by his sister and her husband.

The FBI and Secret Service raid the kidnappers' home and arrest them. When they find Tess buried alive beneath the floor of the farm's barn, Doug and his agents insist on doing the digging. Tess then insists that her Secret Service detail accompany her to the hospital and other officials must remove themselves from the rescue helicopter.

Upon being released from the hospital, Tess refuses to obey the hospital rule that patients must be discharged in a wheelchair. Doug tells her, using her first name for the first time, "Tess, get in the God damn chair." After a pause, Tess complies, pats Doug's hand and says, "Very good, Douglas. You're going to be all right."

== Cast ==
- Shirley MacLaine as First Lady Tess Carlisle
- Nicolas Cage as Secret Service Agent Doug Chesnic
- Austin Pendleton as Earl Fowler
- Edward Albert as Barry Carlisle
- James Rebhorn as FBI Agent Howard Schaeffer
- Richard Griffiths as Frederick
- John Roselius as Secret Service Agent Tom Bahlor
- David Graf as Secret Service Agent Lee Danielson
- Don Yesso as Secret Service Agent Ralph Buoncristiani
- James Lally as Secret Service Agent Joe Spector
- Brant von Hoffman as Secret Service Agent Bob Hutcherson
- Harry J. Lennix as Secret Service Agent Kenny Young
- Susan Blommaert as Kimberly Cannon
- Dale Dye as CIA Agent Charles Ivy
- James Handy as Secret Service Director Neal Carlo
- Hugh Wilson as The President (voice)

== Production ==
In July 1992, it was reported that Hugh Wilson would be writing and directing Guarding Tess at Paramount Pictures for producer Scott Rudin. In October of that year, it was reported that Shirley MacLaine had been cast in the titular role. Paramount initially planned produce Guarding Tess for an intended release in the second half of 1993, but following the departure of studio head Brandon Tartikoff, Paramount's new head, Sherry Lansing, was not receptive to the script Wilson had developed with PJ Torokvei. As stars Shirley MacLaine and Nicolas Cage had pay-or-play deals in place, Lansing gave Wilson a window of time to set the film up elsewhere otherwise Paramount would make the film for a reduced budget. As the film conflicted with his project Addams Family Values, Rudin left the project as a producer. TriStar Pictures picked up the film where Ned and Nancy Graham Tanen took on producing duties.

== Reception ==
Guarding Tess received mixed reviews from critics. Rotten Tomatoes gives the film a 57% rating based on 35 reviews, with an average rating of 5.8/10. On Metacritic, the film has a weighted-average score of 50 out of 100, based on 14 critics, indicating "mixed or average" reviews. The Washington Post described it as derivative of other recent films Driving Miss Daisy (1989), The Bodyguard (1992), and In the Line of Fire (1993), and decries "the melodramatic turnaround that sabotages the last section of the movie", but describes "the comic tension between MacLaine and Cage" as being "so well done, it doesn't matter how dumb things get".

The film grossed $27 million in the United States and Canada but only $3.8 million internationally for a worldwide total of $30.8 million.

The Secret Service did not cooperate with the production, unlike the contemporary In the Line of Fire. Secret Service Agent Jay Nasworthy in 2024 described Guarding Tess as "fairly accurate for a small detail".
