= PJ Torokvei =

Canadian actress

- Torokvei in The New Avengers in 1977
- Born: Peter Torokvei; March 19, 1951; Canada
- Died: July 3, 2013 (aged 62); Canada
- Occupation: Actress
- Years active: 1977–1995

PJ Torokvei (born Peter Torokvei; March 19, 1951 – July 3, 2013) was a Canadian actress. As a trans woman, her professional credits are generally under her former name.

Torokvei was involved with both The Second City and SCTV. Her most notable work for television was as a producer and head writer on WKRP in Cincinnati.

Her notable works in film include the screenplays for Real Genius (1985), Armed and Dangerous (1986), Back to School (1986) and Guarding Tess (1994). She also appeared in and wrote for various television shows and films from the 1970s through the 1990s.

== Career ==
In 1977, Torokvei joined the Toronto branch of Second City, where she met writer/performers Steven Kampmann and Martin Short. Torokvei, Kampmann, and Short collaborated on a short comedy film called The Cisco Kid, which involved dubbing comic dialogue and sound effects onto an older western (much like Woody Allen's What's Up, Tiger Lily?). The film was later broadcast on Canadian TV as an "extra" episode on SCTV.

In 1979, Kampmann and Torokvei went to Los Angeles after The Cisco Kid came to the attention of Hugh Wilson, who invited them to come in and pitch WKRP script ideas. Torokvei would eventually become head writer and stay until near the end of the final season. Many of the show's most memorable and imaginative episodes, including "Real Families", "Daydreams" and "Rumors" were written by Torokvei.

In both 1981 and 1982, Torokvei (as Peter Torokvei) was nominated for Outstanding Comedy Series at the Primetime Emmy Awards in her role as producer on WKRP in Cincinnati.

== Personal life and death ==
In 2001, Torokvei announced to friends and family her intention to transition from her original sex at birth and undergo sex reassignment surgery. In her later years, she left Hollywood and resided on a farm in Victoria, Canada, her native country. She died of liver failure on July 3, 2013, at the age of 62, survived by an ex-wife, son, daughter and grandchildren.

== Filmography ==
=== Actor ===
- The New Avengers (1977)
- SCTV (1981)
- I, Martin Short, Goes Hollywood (1989)
- Hostage for a Day (1994)
- Falling for You (1995)
- Stuart Saves His Family (1995)

=== Producer ===
- WKRP in Cincinnati (Producer - 2 episodes) (1981–1982)

=== Writer ===
- SCTV (1981)
- WKRP in Cincinnati (1979–1982)
- Real Genius (with Neal Israel and Pat Proft) (1985)
- Back to School (with Harold Ramis, Steven Kampmann and Will Porter) (1986)
- Armed and Dangerous (with Harold Ramis) (1986)
- Caddyshack II (with Harold Ramis) (1988)
- The Earth Day Special (1990)
- Guarding Tess (with Hugh Wilson) (1994)
- Hostage for a Day (with Kari Hildebrand and Robert David Crane) (1994)
- A Dream Is a Wish Your Heart Makes (1995)
