= Really Weird Tales =

- Presented by: Joe Flaherty
- Theme music composer: Fred Mollin
- No. of seasons: 1
- No. of episodes: 3

Production
- Production companies: Atlantis Films; Viacom

Original release
- Network: HBO
- Release: October 4, 1986

Really Weird Tales was a Canadian-American science fiction horror comedy anthology series, written and presented by Joe Flaherty. The series featured an assortment of actors previously known for their work on SCTV, including Flaherty, John Candy, Catherine O'Hara, John Hemphill, and Martin Short.

Three episodes of the show were produced. Partially filmed in Toronto, all three episodes premiered back to back in the United States on HBO on October 4, 1986.

== Episodes ==
Really Weird Tales episodes
No.	Title	Directed by	Written by	Original release date
1	"All's Well that Ends Strange"	Paul Lynch	Joe Flaherty, David Flaherty	October 4, 1986
Untalented lounge singer Shucky Forme is performing at a private party at the mansion of Wade Jeffries, a wealthy adult magazine publisher. His performance attracts the attention of Tippy, a striking blonde model who invites him to the mansion's hot tub. The two bond over a desire to do more serious work. When they meet again, they share a moment of passion, until they see what appears to be another model's dead body in the pool. They attempt escaping through a secret passage, where Shucky discovers the models are actually androids. Wade explains his plan to the two: to use robots to fulfill his dream of eternally young "perfect" models. Shucky defies him, but is rebuffed by Tippy, who wishes to stay with Wade. After Shucky accidentally disables Tippy by pulling her arm off, Wade reveals that he is an android as well, and that there was once a living Tippy, but she was "neutralized". Shucky is crushed by the revelation, but his mood revives after hearing a crowd chant his name. Running to perform to the crowd, he discovers that a more capable, robotic Shucky has taken his place on the stage; as he screams, he is shot and killed by Wade. As Flaherty delivers his closing monologue, he begins to slow down and malfunction, revealing him to also be an android. After the robot Flaherty collapses, the real Flaherty appears behind him, remarking: "Quite an unusual twist, wouldn't you say?" Cast: Martin Short, Don Harron, Olivia d'Abo
2	"Cursed with Charisma"	Don McBrearty	Joe Flaherty, John McAndrew, David Flaherty	October 4, 1986
In the struggling small town of Fitchville, tensions erupt in a town hall meeting as the residents discuss whether or not to repair the beheaded statue of the town's founder. The meeting is interrupted by a traveling salesman, Howard Jensen, who makes the suggestion to install a statue head made out of polyvinyl chloride. Once Howard draws the town's residents in with his charisma, he begins extolling the virtues of positive thinking, as well what he believes will make the town's residents rich: no-money-down real estate. His speech attracts attention from a child named Jimmy Hutchins; when Howard mentions needing a place to stay, he suggests staying in his family's house. Fitchville is engulfed in a frenzy, buying and selling the same properties multiple times. Howard becomes a mentor and father figure to Jimmy, to the concern of his mother. The real estate boom proves unsustainable; finding themselves in massive debt, the residents form an angry mob that approaches the Hutchins' household. As the town descends on Howard, two aliens from the "interplanetary police" arrive, revealing that Howard is actually a wanted alien criminal with a history of promoting get-rich-quick schemes on other planets. Howard is arrested, but distracts the officers by throwing Jimmy at them, before escaping by transforming into a ball of light that clumsily ascends into the stars. With Howard gone, Jimmy uses his newfound charisma to pitch cash advances to the ruined residents of Fitchville; to his mother's horror, the town is drawn to his pitch. Cast: John Candy, Chris Janusczak, Sheila McCarthy, Don Lake
3	"I'll Die Loving"	John Blanchard	Joe Flaherty, Catherine O'Hara, David Flaherty	October 4, 1986
At a convent, news approaches that the father of Theresa Sharpe, a girl who had been staying with the convent's nuns, has died. Per her father's will, Theresa is released from the convent to live in the outside world. Talking with the convent's mother superior before her release, she reveals the reason for her stay, as well as for her harsh treatment by the nuns: since birth, she has experienced an illness that makes anything she shows affection to explode. Theresa learns that this was the cause of her mother's death, and confirms her illness by making a picture of her father explode. To ensure she never shows love for anyone, she takes a job in the complaints desk of a department store in New York City, processing returns of "Cauliflower Child Dolls" for irate customers. At her work, she finds himself unwittingly part of a love triangle between Todd, her manager, and Mervis, an abhorrent coworker. Visiting a psychiatrist, she is told that her affliction could be cured by falling in love with someone she finds repulsive. In response, she arranges a date with Mervis, planning to go on a date with Todd the following day. Drunk, and towards the end of her date, Theresa feels a moment of true affection for Mervis, which cures her condition and allows her to freely show affection. However, she reveals her purpose for her date to Mervis, who is enraged. In anger, Mervis shouts "I hate you!" to Theresa, transforming her into a Cauliflower Child Doll. As Flaherty delivers his final monologue, the doll expresses love to him, causing him to explode. Cast: Catherine O'Hara, Jayne Eastwood, David McIlwraith, John Hemphill, Paul Soles

== Reception ==
Writing for The New York Times, John J. O'Connor praised "All's Well that Ends Strange", calling it "positively inspired" and calling Martin Short's performance "terrific". Blockbuster gave the series 2 and a half stars in their Guide to Movies and Videos, stating that it "has its moments, the best of which are [Catherine] O'Hara's."

In a mostly negative review of the DVD release for DVD Talk, Jesse Skeen said the show "plays like something that would have come from a pile of rejected ideas", and remarked "I've had many dreams that were more weird and entertaining than the stories presented here". Skeen also criticized the audio and video quality of the DVD, as well as the relative lack of special features. Ultimately, however, Skeen laments that there were only three episodes of the show produced, saying the producers of the show "would have gotten it right eventually" with the comedic talent involved.

== Home media ==
All three episodes received a release on VHS in 1987.

In 2016, Kino Lorber released the series on DVD for the first time.
