= Hostage for a Day =

1994 Canadian made-for-television film

- Written by: Kari Hildebrand; Robert David Crane; Peter Torokvei
- Directed by: John Candy
- Starring: George Wendt; John Candy
- Music by: Ian Thomas
- Country of origin: Canada
- Original language: English

Production
- Producer: Adam Haight
- Cinematography: David Herrington
- Editor: Jeff Warren
- Running time: 95 minutes

Original release
- Network: Fox
- Release: April 25, 1994

Hostage for a Day is a 1994 Canadian television comedy film directed by John Candy, in his only directorial effort. Though the film is also billed as "starring" Candy, he in fact plays only a minor role, as a Russian hostage taker. Produced with a mostly Canadian cast, the film was released one month after Candy's death.

== Plot ==
Forty one year old copy shop worker Warren Kooey begins having a mid-life crisis. His plans are to take a trip to the state of Alaska, but his plans are derailed after his wife drains his entire bank account (approximately $40,000) to pay for a remodelling job by famous home builder and blond, long haired Italian heartthrob "Hondo."

In order to recuperate his money Kooey decides to pose as being held hostage by an imaginary Russian terrorist, and calls the SWAT Team on himself in an effort to extort $50,000 (to Kooey's disappointment, the incompetent SWAT team has suffered major budget cuts). Things take a turn for the worse, when Russian terrorist Yuri Petrovich takes Kooey hostage.

== Cast ==
- George Wendt as Warren Kooey
- John Vernon as V.D. Regan
- Robin Duke as Elizabeth Kooey
- Peter Torokvei as Ronny
- Kathleen Laskey as Jackie
- Don Lake as Lt. Sneed
- Currie Graham as Hondo
- John Hemphill as Andre Petrovich
- Christopher Anne Templeton as Diane St. Clair
- Walter Alza as Ramon
- Rick Bennett as Caretaker
- Vic Cummings as Television Anchor Paul
- Monika Deol as Monica Etheridge
- Kathy Greenwood as a SWAT Team Member
- Jack Duffy as a SWAT Team Member
- Peter Ferri as Derelict Madman
- John Candy as Yuri Petrovich
