= Charlie Stewart (actor) =

American actor

- Born: September 9, 1993 (age 32); Las Vegas, Nevada, U.S.
- Occupation: Actor
- Years active: 2000–2013

Charlie Stewart (born September 9, 1993) is an American former actor known for his work in television and film. He had a role as Bob in the Disney Channel series The Suite Life of Zack & Cody and The Suite Life on Deck.

== Early life ==
Charlie Stewart was born in Las Vegas, Nevada. He moved to Los Angeles, California with his family, where he was discovered by his manager in a restaurant.

== Career ==
Stewart made his television debut in 2000 at the age of seven, appearing on the medical drama ER. In 2002, he was cast as Charlie Molloy on the sitcom Life with Bonnie, portraying the son of a television talk show host. His performance in the series earned him nominations for the Young Artist Award. He remained with the show until its conclusion in 2004.

In 2005, Stewart joined the cast of The Suite Life of Zack & Cody as Bob, a recurring character on the Disney Channel sitcom. He continued in this role until the series ended in 2008 and reprised it in the spin-off The Suite Life on Deck.

Stewart has also appeared in various films, including The Animal (2001) and The Santa Clause 3: The Escape Clause (2006). Additionally, he had guest roles in several television series such as How I Met Your Mother, Malcolm in the Middle, and Gilmore Girls.

== Filmography ==
=== Film ===
- The Animal (2001)
- The Santa Clause 3: The Escape Clause (2006)
- The Secret Lives of Dorks (2013)

=== Television ===
- ER, 1 episode (2000)
- Life with Bonnie, 43 episodes (2002–2004)
- Even Stevens, 1 episode (2003)
- The Suite Life of Zack & Cody, 16 episodes (2005–2007)
- The Suite Life on Deck, 1 episode (2008)
- How I Met Your Mother, 1 episode (2009)
- Bones, 1 episode (2009)
- Malcolm in the Middle, 1 episode (2000)
- Gilmore Girls, 2 episodes (2000)

== Awards and nominations ==
- 2003 - Young Artist Award nomination for his role in Life with Bonnie (Best Performance in a TV Series (Comedy or Drama) - Young Actor Ten or Under)
- 2004 - Young Artist Award nomination for his role in Life with Bonnie (Best Performance in a TV Series (Comedy or Drama) - Leading Young Actor)
- 2007 - Young Artist Award nomination for his role in The Santa Clause 3: The Escape Clause (Best Young Ensemble in a Feature Film)
