= List of Bizarre episodes =

The following is a list of episodes of Bizarre, a Canadian sketch comedy television series that aired from 1980 to 1986 on CTV in Canada, and in the United States on the Showtime premium cable network. Impressionist John Byner was the host of Bizarre, often joined by Bob Einstein, often playing the roles of the show's producer, and stuntman Super Dave Osborne. Much of the humour on the show was considered risque during the original run of the series, especially on episodes seen on Showtime, due to more-relaxed programming standards.

Season	Episodes
1	21
2	26
3	28
4	25
5	21
6	24

== Season one (1980–1981) ==
No. overall	No. in season	Directed by	Showtime air date
1	1	Morris Abraham	October 17, 1980
In the first episode, sketches include telephone operators asking callers what shows they were watching, parents dealing with a problem child, Super Dave performs his first stunt, a sketch involving stereotypes and a visit to a football training camp headed by George Allen.
1	2	Morris Abraham	TBA
Sketches include a couple dealing with secrets just before marriage, Super Dave in New Mexico to do a stunt involving arrows being shot at him, a very sensitive airport metal screener, a commentary by John Byner on nuclear power, a vampire visiting a doctor sketch that evolves into celebrity impersonations and a husband thinking his wife is unfaithful with good cause.
1	21	Morris Abraham	TBA
Sketches include a senator is lobbied about gun control, a stripper talks with a club patron about her plans, a woman talks how her marriage is becoming boring, two office works get very competitive, a scientist says he has proofs frogs have ears in their hind legs, a newlyweds sketch is redone with a studio audience member and John interviews the mother of a hot basketball prospect.

== Season two (1981–1982) ==
No. overall	No. in season	Directed by	Showtime air date
2	1	Maurice Abraham	September 14, 1981
Sketches include two women forced to dress in a very small dressing room, a man receives an unusual package at home, Super Dave Osborne attempts to jump from the CN Tower in his latest stunt, two rival faith healers meet at a bus stop and John interviews Billy Barty who debuts his new music album.
2	2	Maurice Abraham	TBA
Sketches include a kid visiting a sick Babe Ruth, John does his version of Father Vito Capalucci, a divorce ceremony is held at a church, an elderly man has a bare knuckle fight with his son for fun, a man grumbles that his unusual house upsets his wife, a person visits "McDoctor In The Box", a sketch is interrupted by John seeing an extra wearing his stuff and a man and woman communicate with tear away T-shirts.
2	3	Maurice Abraham	TBA
Sketches include a man visiting a morgue to identify a friend through unusual means, a zany Japanese inventor, a Hurtz rental store that has a wide and unusual range of items for rental, a sketch is done twice with a few twists involving Tom Harvey used in the second take and John welcomes a fan to the show.
2	4	Maurice Abraham	TBA
Sketches include a hospital patient visited by Strip-O-Gram, two couples play a party game called "Who Am I?", Super Dave performs his latest stunt, a man and woman discuss when is the proper time for going to sleep with kids and a lecture on television immorality by the Reverend Tee Vee Seewell.
2	5	Maurice Abraham	TBA
Sketches include a network executive speaking about accusation of drug use in the entertainment industry, a man helps a couple he is friends with deal with their daughter's request, a karate match with unusual injuries, the press secretary for God takes questions from a press panel and a florist shows celebrity themed plants to a customer.
2	6	Maurice Abraham	TBA
Sketches include a visit to the chiropractor, an ice cream shop where the owner communicates with T-shirts, a lingerie party for housewives that ends oddly, a criminal sketch where the language is modified to appease the censors, Howie Mandel appears in a comedy spot and John is interviewed in his dressing room by a female reporter while nude.
2	10	Maurice Abraham	TBA
Sketches include the world's first robot magician, an editorial by the Godfather, a blind date goes awry under unusual circumstances, a visit with the Bigots family, an episode of "The Truth Hurts" and John meets with an artist who has made a work from sand grains.
2	11	Maurice Abraham	TBA
Sketches include a gym workout with unusual equipment, the All Fat news network, a dinner is interrupted by a Mafiagram message, Super Dave performs his latest stunt and a vaudeville brothers act with one member deceased but performing.
2	12	Maurice Abraham	TBA
Sketches include a near sighted woman throwing darts at balloons, a funeral for a professional wrestler, an interview with a White House shoe shine man, a woman visits a cosmetic surgeon who specializes in unusual procedures and a wedding for a game show host.
2	13	Maurice Abraham	TBA
Sketches include a man visiting a New You shop for body changes, John interviews a female golfer answering charges she is too sexual in her play, an interview with Hollywood's oldest stuntman, a visit with the Bigots family and a short talk show segment with the Elephant Man.
2	14	Maurice Abraham	TBA
Sketches include an interview with a popular Mexican professional baseball player, a couple decides to tell their child he was a test tube baby, "Yoga For Health", prison inmates talk about the "deplorable" conditions of their life and a visit with the Bigots family.
2	15	Maurice Abraham	TBA
Sketches include a ship in a bottle is used to open the show, a professor tries to help two pandas mate, a game of poker is interrupted by a KKKogram, a music store owner deals with a disgruntled customer, Howie Mandel does stand-up comedy and John answers the charge that his audience is filled with family members.
2	16	Maurice Abraham	TBA
Sketches include "Abscam Camera", an interview with Santa Claus, a man tries to leave early in the morning but the woman he's with objects, a visit to a suicide boutique and John brings out Rufus, a dog puppet, to do impressions.
2	17	Maurice Abraham	TBA
Sketches include two drunk men going to court about a car accident, a destitute man is invited to eat at a restaurant, a visit with the Bigots family, two women pretend to be men to be hired for a job, an interview with a tanning salon owner and an aspiring author shows his manuscript to a famous, though struggling, author.
2	18	Maurice Abraham	TBA
Sketches include a superhero having to use the washroom at the last minute, a writer talks with a Hollywood producer about his script, a kids baseball team gets a pep talk from their coach, a lawyer meets with a client who is a menacing convict, Howie Mandel guest stars and an interview with a scientist who works with rats in his research.
2	19	Maurice Abraham	TBA
Sketches include Diana and Charles exchanging vows, a patient and psychiatrist have trouble figuring out who is who and an expert in home security is interviewed.
2	20	Maurice Abraham	TBA
Sketches include a scientist unthawing a man frozen to cure a disease he had long ago, Tom Harvey interviews a family that all have unusually large body parts, a man and woman from a conservative film group view an upcoming film for critiquing purposes, Bizarre presents "The High Anxiety of a Blazing Snow White", a visit with the Bigots family and the closing remarks are interrupted for a clothing change.
2	21	Maurice Abraham	TBA
Sketches include John opening the show with an odd appearance, "Yoga For Health", a pro athlete seeks a renegotiation of his contract, a doctor converses with a cleaning lady, a couple's celebration of their wedding anniversary is interrupted by Gayogram and two elderly men try to escape from their prison cell.
2	22	Maurice Abraham	TBA
Sketches include a studio president talking with Cheech and Chong about their next movie, a toymaker gets help from two dolls while he sleeps, a look at a criminal unemployment office, a man visits a slow food diner, a woman thinks her ex-husband is spoiling their son far too much and a silent look at a day in the life of a baseball manager.
2	23	Maurice Abraham	TBA
Sketches include paying fines for a wide range of offenses, a look at a puppet penitentiary show, a visit to a church of punk, an interview with jailed assassin Sirhan Sirhan, a segment of a late night talk show a century after it originally aired and an oration from Tee Vee Seewell.
2	24	Maurice Abraham	TBA
Sketches include a visit to a glass plane manufacturing office, auditions for a part on "Fantasy Island", a horse trainer protests a winning horse's run on allegations it was done with the aid of illegal drugs, a man tries to pick up a controversial personalized license plate, Dullahue interviews a woman married to a dead man and a sketch with an elderly man getting into bed with a much younger woman ends early on the producer's request.
2	25	Maurice Abraham	TBA
In the Season 2 edition of The Best of Bizarre, sketches include the hospital patient visited by Strip-O-Gram, the man receives an unusual package at home, Super Dave Osborne's attempt to jump from the CN Tower in his latest stunt, a horse trainer protests a winning horse's run on allegations it was done with the aid of illegal drugs, Tee Vee Seewell's lecture on television immorality and a man and woman communicate with tear away T-shirts.
2	26	Maurice Abraham	TBA
In the Two Years of Bizarre episode, sketches include telephone operators asking callers what shows they were watching, John's version of Father Vito Capalucci, the non controversial parade in San Francisco, the very sensitive airport metal screener, Super Dave Osborne's stunt from New Mexico, two rival faith healers meet at a bus stop and the visit to the football training camp headed by George Allen.

== Season three (1982–1983) ==
No. overall	No. in season	Directed by	Showtime air date
3	1	Jack Budgell	September 13, 1982
Sketches include an inmate attempting to break out of prison, a visit to a cheap plastic surgeon, Super Dave Osborne performs his latest stunt and a newlywed couple sketch is done twice with an audience member used in the second take.
3	2	Jack Budgell	September 20, 1982
Sketches include a couple that encounters an unusual dress code at a restaurant, Richard Simmons announces his candidacy for the president of the United States, a visit to the family known as the Bigots, John interviews an author about sex on television and a sketch with two couples at a Chinese restaurant goes awry for an unusual reason.
3	3	Jack Budgell	TBA
Sketches include the manager of New York Yankees holding a series of press conferences, a priest tries to exorcise Saturday morning television out of a child, Super Dave performs his latest stunt with the aid of a stopwatch, the Schlock School For Insecurity welcomes its latest client and John does an Elvis impersonation, to the disapproval of Bob.
3	4	Jack Budgell	TBA
Sketches include having the show's opening interpreted for amnesiacs, "Yoga For Health", an opera singer bids farewell to her career in an unusual way, a coach spends the entire team's budget on one player, a senator is interviewed after appearing in court on serious sex related charges, Don Corleone is the guest for "Face The Press" and two well known sports personalities sing a duet.
3	28	Jack Budgell	TBA
Sketches include an interview with the billionaire husband of a younger woman, a funeral eulogy given by a ventriloquist in mourning for a fellow ventriloquist, a visit with the Bigots family, a look at auditions for the Don Corleone in the Godfather movie and Bob takes issue with the idea that he belittles others.

== Season four (1983–1984) ==
No. overall	No. in season	Directed by	Showtime air date
4	1	Jack Budgell	September 15, 1983
Sketches include John dating a woman who can't be intimate with a man unless he makes her laugh, Super Dave kicks off his world tour by demonstrating some street dancing, a Bizarre fable about a despondent bank teller offered help by an ugly witch for a price and John appears as "Little Stevie Byner".
4	25	Jack Budgell	TBA
Sketches include an interview with a resident of Toxic Waste, Indiana, "Yoga For Health", a man visits an unusual psychiatrist and a rehearsal for a soap opera episode.

== Season five (1984–1985) ==
No. overall	No. in season	Directed by	Showtime air date
5	1	Jack Budgell	TBA
Sketches include a well known celebrity performing in an obscured way, a tear away T-shirt sketch, Super Dave Osborne performs his latest stunt and a kidnapping sketch has trouble getting to the punch line.
5	2	Jack Budgell	TBA
Sketches include a man propositioning women at a bar, the Reverend Tee Vee Seewell attempts to heal failing stand-up comics, Tom Harvey attempts to introduce a sketch but is replaced by audience members and John appears as "Boy John" singing Karma Chameleon and "Cher" in a duet with Bob.

== Season six (1985–1986) ==
No. overall	No. in season	Directed by	Showtime air date
6	1	Jack Budgell	TBA
Sketches include a doctor seeing an elderly patient with an unusual hearing problem, Super Dave Osborne performs his latest stunt at a baseball park and an interview with a European sex expert.
6	2	Jack Budgell	TBA
Sketches include Cedars of Shtick Hospital", Bizarre instant vacations and "Life of The Rich And Bizarre".
6	24	Jack Budgell	TBA
In this final episode, sketches include a man trying to propose to a woman at a restaurant but a drum player drowning out his every word, a man is mugged for his credit cards and ID, four men have a meal and leave a very meager tip for an irate waiter, a college dean meets with a college football star who is thinking of leaving college early and turning pro, a look at marriage proposals in a "Yesterday, today and tomorrow" viewpoint, an episode of "The Don King Family" and Howard Hughes takes questions in "Face The Press".
6	25	Jack Budgell	TBA
In this, The Best of Bizarre 6, a visit with a Bizarre photographer, "Rocky's Kitchen" from the Stallone Cable Network, Super Dave's fire walking stunt, the Holiday Hair promo spot, the competition for mixed pairs with an unusual criteria and the second "Really Good Sex" segment.
