= Don Lake =

Canadian actor, writer, and television producer (born 1956)

- Born: Donald Lake; November 26, 1956 (age 69); Toronto, Ontario, Canada
- Education: California Institute of the Arts
- Occupations: Actor, writer, television producer
- Years active: 1980–present

Donald Lake (born November 26, 1956) is a Canadian actor, writer, and television producer. He is frequently cast by director Christopher Guest, and is also a close friend and frequent collaborator of Bonnie Hunt.

He had a role in The Bonnie Hunt Show, for which he received comedic praise. He also had roles in the comedy films Police Academy, Hot Shots!, Dumb & Dumber To, and Corner Gas: The Movie. He played more serious roles in Terminator 2: Judgment Day and Super Mario Bros., along with a voice role as Stu Hopps in Zootopia. He is also known as Dr. Carl Whitehorn on The Fresh Prince of Bel-Air. He portrayed General Brad Gregory on Space Force.

== Life and career ==
After graduating from the California Institute of the Arts, he returned to Toronto to join the Second City Touring Company, and later was promoted to The Second City. He also appeared in the Netflix comedy series Space Force.

== Filmography ==
=== Film ===
| Year | Title | Role | Notes |
|---|---|---|---|
| 1980 | Don't Answer the Phone! | Man in Plastic | |
| 1982 | Lookin' to Get Out | Alfred Jordon - Registration Desk | |
| 1984 | Police Academy | Lou, aka Mr. Wig | |
| 1986 | The Pink Chiquitas | Deputy Barney Drum | |
| 1987 | The Big Town | Patsy Fuqua | |
| 1987 | Blue Monkey | Elliot Jacobs | |
| 1988 | Short Circuit 2 | Manic Mike | |
| 1988 | Something About Love | Sam | |
| 1989 | Speed Zone | Whitman | |
| 1991 | Terminator 2: Judgment Day | Detective Mossberg | |
| 1991 | Hot Shots! | Doctor | |
| 1993 | Super Mario Bros. | Sgt. Simon | |
| 1993 | Beethoven's 2nd | Window Display Manager | |
| 1994 | Wagons East | Lt. Bailey | |
| 1996 | Waiting for Guffman | Phil Burgess - Blaine Historian | |
| 1997 | RocketMan | Flight Surgeon | |
| 1998 | Almost Heroes | Elias | |
| 2000 | The Extreme Adventures of Super Dave | Donald | Also story writer |
| 2000 | Return to Me | Transplant Man | Also writer |
| 2000 | Best in Show | Graham Chissolm | |
| 2003 | A Mighty Wind | Elliott Steinbloom | |
| 2006 | For Your Consideration | "Love It" critic Ben Lilly | |
| 2008 | Smother | Minister | |
| 2013 | Grudge Match | Video Game Producer | |
| 2014 | Dumb and Dumber To | Dr. Meldmann | |
| 2014 | Corner Gas: The Movie | Jerome | |
| 2016 | Zootopia | Stu Hopps | Voice |
| 2016 | Mascots | Buddy Campbell | |
| 2017 | Downsizing | Leisureland Guide Matt | |
| 2025 | Spinal Tap II: The End Continues | Tour Guide | |
| 2025 | Zootopia 2 | Stu Hopps | Voice |
| 2026 | The Dink | Gary | |

=== Television ===
| Year | Title | Role | Notes |
|---|---|---|---|
| 1979 | The Dating Game | Contestant (picked) | |
| 1982 | SCTV Network | Troy / Cue Card Guy | 2 episodes |
| 1983 | The Littlest Hobo | Mr. Wilkinson | 2 episodes |
| 1985 | Hangin' In | Max | Episode: "No Nukes Is Good Nukes" |
| 1985 | Check It Out! | Officer Stevenson | Episode: "Car Pool" |
| 1986 | Hot Shots | Dr. Post | Episode: "The Star" |
| 1986 | Really Weird Tales | Hugh Mullins | Episode: "Cursed with Charisma" |
| 1987 | Adderly | | Episode: "Miscellaneous News" |
| 1987–1991 | Super Dave | Donald Glanz | |
| 1989 | Alfred Hitchcock Presents | A.C. Boone | Episode: "Diamonds Aren't Forever" |
| 1989 | Murphy Brown | Stage Manager | Episode: "The Morning Show" |
| 1989 | Mr. Belvedere | Man #1 | Episode: "A Happy Guy's Christmas" |
| 1989 | Midnight Caller | Big Bob Johnson | Episode: "Do You Believe in Miracles?" |
| 1989 | Not Necessarily the News | Andy / Dr. Harold Becker | 3 episodes |
| 1990 | Maniac Mansion | | Story writer; Episode: "Trapped Like Rats" |
| 1990 | My Two Dads | Mr. Higgins | Episode: "Kind of a Drag" |
| 1990 | The Dave Thomas Comedy Show | Various | 5 episodes |
| 1990 | Doctor Doctor | Sheldon Boehm | 2 episodes |
| 1990–1991 | My Talk Show | Mr. Snelling, Anne Marie's Husband | |
| 1991 | Lenny | Dr. Randall | Episode: "G.I. Joe" |
| 1991 | The Golden Girls | Mr. Porter | Episode: "Older and Wiser" |
| 1991 | Parker Lewis Can't Lose | Ira Lefko | Episode: "Teens from a Mall" |
| 1991 | Empty Nest | John Edgar Moss | Episode: "Food for Thought" |
| 1991–1992 | Bill & Ted's Excellent Adventures | Mr. Preston | Voice, 11 episodes |
| 1992 | Blossom | Cop #1 | Episode: "Three O'Clock and All Is Hell" |
| 1992 | L.A. Law | Bob Steinlage | Episode: "Double Breasted Suit" |
| 1992 | Super Dave: Daredevil for Hire | | Voice, 13 episodes |
| 1993 | Camp Wilder | Ed | Episode: "Career Day" |
| 1993 | The Building | Brad | 5 episodes |
| 1994 | Love & War | Justice of the Peace | Episode: "A Fine Romance" |
| 1994 | Ellen | Bob | Episode: "The Class Reunion" |
| 1994 | Hostage for a Day | Lt. Sneed | Television film |
| 1994 | The Boys Are Back | Doctor | Episode: "The Fishing Trip" |
| 1995 | Double Rush | IRS Man | Episode: "Johnny and the Pacemakers" |
| 1995 | The Fresh Prince of Bel-Air | Dr. Whitehorn | Episode: "Will Is from Mars..." |
| 1995–1996 | Bonnie | Keith Jedzik | 12 episodes |
| 1996 | Sparks | Sid Varella | Episode: "Sid, Lies, and Videotape" |
| 1997 | Murder One | Joel Mytelka | 2 episodes |
| 1997 | Men Behaving Badly | Epstein | Episode: "Playing Doctor" |
| 1997 | Goode Behavior | | Episode: "The Goode, the Bad, and the Willie" |
| 1997–2000 | Pepper Ann | Mr. Sherman Finky / various voices | 16 episodes |
| 1999 | The Wild Thornberrys | Harold Fervel | Voice, episode: "Chimp Off the Old Block" |
| 1999 | Larry David: Curb Your Enthusiasm | HBO Director | Television film |
| 2000 | Teacher's Pet | Mr. Naven | Voice, episode: "Bad to the Bone/Always Knock the Postman Twice" |
| 2001 | Philly | Rudy Garfield | Episode: "Fork You Very Much" |
| 2002–2003 | Watching Ellie | Dr. Don Zimmerman | 16 episodes |
| 2003–2004 | Life with Bonnie | Clown / Dr. Bill McClaw / Micky Travisi | 3 episodes; also creator, writer, and executive producer |
| 2003 | Odd Job Jack | Anton | Voice, episode: "The Man Who Smelled Too Much" |
| 2005 | American Dragon: Jake Long | Stan the Sewer Troll | Voice, episode: "Old School Training" |
| 2005 | Committed | Richard | Episode: "The Morning After" |
| 2006 | Rugrats: Tales from the Crib | Tom Thumb / Gingerbread Man | Voice, episode: "Three Jacks and a Beanstalk" |
| 2006 | The New Adventures of Old Christine | Carl | Episode: "Crash" |
| 2007 | American Dad! | Bad Larry / Spy | Voice, episode: "The 42-Year-Old Virgin" |
| 2008–2010 | The Bonnie Hunt Show | Himself | Also writer and executive producer |
| 2010 | Avalon High | Allie's Father | Television film |
| 2010 | Psych | C. Lee Banting | Episode: "Dead Bear Walking" |
| 2011 | $h*! My Dad Says | Marvin | Episode: "Ed Goes to Court" |
| 2011 | Man Up! | Walter | Episode: "Fear" |
| 2012 | Modern Family | Dr. Sendroff | Episode: "Lifetime Supply" |
| 2012 | Last Man Standing | Professor | Episode: "Ding Dong Ditch" |
| 2012 | How I Met Your Mother | Judge Albert Donovan | Episode: "Twelve Horny Women" |
| 2013 | Family Tree | Harvey Krupp | Episode: "Civil War" |
| 2014 | Anger Management | James | Episode: "Charlie and the Mother of All Sessions" |
| 2015 | The Odd Couple | Kent | Episode: "The Audit Couple" |
| 2016 | The Soul Man | Dr. Zagelman | 2 episodes |
| 2017 | Still the King | Sheriff | Episode: "Still Still the King" |
| 2017 | Baroness von Sketch Show | Ground Control | Episode: "Don't Make Me Send a Lawyer Up There" |
| 2018 | Marlon | Hank Hoffstetter | Episode: "Model Parent" |
| 2018 | Teachers | Bob | Episode: "Step by Stepsister" |
| 2018–2020 | NCIS | Captain Phillip Brooks | 3 episodes |
| 2019 | Pup Academy | Charlie | 13 episodes |
| 2019 | Summer Camp Island | Dr. Hogsbottom / additional voices | 2 episodes |
| 2019 | The Resident | Jerry Tolman | Episode: "Choice Words" |
| 2020–2022 | Space Force | Brad Gregory | 16 episodes |
| 2022 | Ghosts | Tom | Episode: "Spies" |
| 2022 | Zootopia+ | Stu Hopps | Voice, episode: "Hopp on Board" |
| 2023 | Not Dead Yet | Rand | Episode: "Not Dating Yet" |
| 2023 | Frasier | Dean Melvin | Episode: "The Founders' Society" |
| 2024, 2026 | Ted | Bert | 2 episodes |
