= Return to Me =

2000 film by Bonnie Hunt

- Theatrical release poster
- Directed by: Bonnie Hunt
- Screenplay by: Bonnie Hunt; Don Lake
- Story by: Bonnie Hunt; Don Lake; Andrew Stern; Samantha Goodman
- Produced by: Jennie Lew Tugend
- Starring: David Duchovny; Minnie Driver; Carroll O'Connor; Robert Loggia; David Alan Grier; Bonnie Hunt; Joely Richardson; James Belushi
- Cinematography: László Kovács
- Edited by: Garth Craven
- Music by: Danny DiMinno; Carmen Lombardo; Nicholas Pike
- Production company: Metro-Goldwyn-Mayer Pictures
- Distributed by: MGM Distribution Co. (United States and Canada); United International Pictures (International)
- Release date: April 7, 2000
- Running time: 115 minutes
- Country: United States
- Language: English
- Budget: $24 million
- Box office: $36 million

Return to Me is a 2000 American romantic comedy-drama film directed by Bonnie Hunt and starring David Duchovny and Minnie Driver. It was filmed in Chicago and was released on April 7, 2000 by Metro-Goldwyn-Mayer Pictures. It was Carroll O'Connor's final film before his death the following year.

== Plot ==
Bob and Elizabeth Rueland live and work in Chicago. Bob is an architect and Elizabeth is a zoologist at Lincoln Park Zoo.

On the night of her fundraiser for a new primate house, Bob promises Elizabeth that he will finish the building. However, she is killed in a car accident leaving the fundraiser, and her heart is transplanted to artist Grace Briggs, who has suffered from heart disease since the age of 14 and is near death.

The surgery is successful, and Grace is able to live a normal life for the first time. She plans to take her first airplane trip to Italy to paint. Grace's best friend Megan Dayton encourages her to start dating in spite of her self-consciousness about the long surgical scar on her chest.

Grace writes a letter to the donor's family after the surgery, thanking them for the heart she received, but it takes her more than a year to find the courage to mail the letter. Bob works to build the primate house for which Elizabeth raised money, but he is still depressed a year after her death and recognizes that he must resume his life.

A friend organizes a blind date for Bob that goes badly, as his date is very obnoxious, petty and self-absorbed. However, Bob is drawn to the waitress, Grace, who is also the granddaughter of the restaurant's owner.

Although they are both unaware of the connection they have through Elizabeth's heart, Bob and Grace begin to date. As they grow closer together, she is reluctant to share her medical history. After several months of dating, Grace finally decides to tell Bob about the transplant. However, before she can do so, she finds the letter that she had sent several months earlier in Bob's house.

Horrified by the discovery, Grace flees and tells Megan what has happened. Megan's husband Joe becomes infuriated because he has misunderstood Grace's panic and thinks Bob must be married. Megan then shouts at Joe, "Grace has Bob's dead wife's heart!" When Grace meets Bob again, she tells him the truth, leaving him speechless.

Against Megan's advice to face the situation, Grace travels to Italy alone. Back at home, Bob realizes that although he will always miss Elizabeth, he pines for Grace, so he reunites with her in Italy. They return to Chicago for the dedication of the new primate house.

The characters, including a pregnant Megan, dance at a wedding reception.

== Cast ==
- David Duchovny as Bob Rueland
- Minnie Driver as Grace Briggs
- Carroll O'Connor as Marty O'Reilly
- Robert Loggia as Angelo Pardipillo
- Bonnie Hunt as Megan Dayton
- David Alan Grier as Charlie Johnson
- Joely Richardson as Elizabeth Rueland
- Eddie Jones as Emmett McFadden
- James Belushi as Joe Dayton
- William Bronder as Wally Jatczak
- Marianne Muellerleile as Sophie
- Dick Cusack as Mr. Bennington
- Joseph Gian as Singer
- Tom Virtue as Dr. Sederak
- Brian Howe as Mike
- David Pasquesi as Tony
- Don Lake as Transplant Man
- Peetey as Mel

== Production ==
In July 1997, it was announced Bonnie Hunt had signed a deal with MGM to direct Distance Calls, a film about a man who falls in love with the woman who was the donor recipient of his late wife’s heart, from a script by Andrew Stern and Samantha Goodman with Hunt providing a rewrite. In January 1999, it was announced the title was now Return to Me with David Duchovny as one of the leads and Minnie Driver in final negotiations to star opposite Duchovny.

== Reception ==
The film received generally mixed reviews. Based on 102 reviews, it has a score of 63% at Rotten Tomatoes. The consensus reads: "David Duchovny and Minnie Driver provide heart-warming romance and comedy in this solid debut by director Bonnie Hunt." Metacritic, which uses a weighted average, assigned the film a score of 54 out of 100, based on 33 critics, indicating "mixed or average" reviews.

Peter Stack of the San Francisco Chronicle stated, "Old-fashioned as all get-out, Return to Me is swathed in an unabashed feel-good tone." Roger Ebert called the film "so innocent, so naive, so sweet and sincere, that you must leave your cynicism at the door or choose another movie." Entertainment Weekly's Lisa Schwarzbaum awarded the film a C+ grade and stated that "the alluringly deadpan Duchovny can make no headway with Driver." Jay Carr of The Boston Globe called the film "ultimately too bland and safe."

The film opened in fourth place at the North American box office, earning US$7.8 million in its opening weekend, behind The Road to El Dorado, Erin Brockovich and Rules of Engagement. It returned $32,662,299 during its entire box-office run.

== See also ==
- Last Christmas (film), a 2019 film with a similar storyline
- Beyond Goodbye a Japanese drama with a similar story.
- Summer Scent, a 2003 Korean drama with similar theme.
