= John Hemphill (actor) =

Canadian comic actor, writer, and producer (born 1953)

- Born: 1953 (age 72–73)
- Citizenship: Canada
- Occupations: comic actor, writer and producer

John Hemphill (born 1953) is a Canadian comic actor, writer and producer.

== Career ==
A longtime player with The Second City troupe's Toronto cast, Hemphill was a writer for Second City Television and appeared in supporting character roles such as Happy Marsden, Wesley Wilks, Willem DeCooney and Dr. Ryne Thurman.

Hemphill has appeared in the television series RoboRoach, The Jane Show, Little Mosque on the Prairie and Maniac Mansion, and the television films Hostage for a Day and Sodbusters. He was also the co-writer, with Eugene Levy, of Sodbusters. Hemphill appeared in Adventures in Babysitting in 1987. In 2003, he began directing the comedy troupe Women Fully Clothed, composed of Second City alumnae Debra McGrath, Robin Duke, Jayne Eastwood, Teresa Pavlinek and Kathy Greenwood.

Hemphill portrayed Bob Currie on Schitt's Creek from 2015 to 2020. For his performance, he was nominated for a Canadian Screen Award for Best Supporting Actor in a Comedy Series at the 5th Canadian Screen Awards.

He received a Gemini Award nomination for Best Supporting Actor in a Comedy Program for Sodbusters at the 9th Gemini Awards in 1995.

== Filmography ==
=== Film ===
| Year | Title | Role | Notes |
|---|---|---|---|
| 1986 | The Pink Chiquitas | Ernie Bodine | |
| 1987 | Adventures in Babysitting | Drunk at Party | |
| 1987 | Goofballs | Aldo | |
| 2004 | New York Minute | Tim Brooger | |
| 2005 | The Man | Ted | |
| 2007 | Zodiac | Donald Cheney | |

=== Television ===
| Year | Title | Role | Notes |
|---|---|---|---|
| 1981–1984 | Bizarre | Various roles | 14 episodes; also writer |
| 1982–1983 | SCTV Network | Various roles | 12 episodes; also writer |
| 1983–1984 | SCTV Channel | Various roles | 13 episodes; also writer |
| 1985 | Workin' for Peanuts | Al | Television role |
| 1987 | Really Weird Tales | Mervis Jutt | Television role |
| 1988 | Biographies: The Enigma of Bobby Bittman | Buddy Phelps | Television role |
| 1988 | The Second City Toronto 15th Anniversary | Johnny Prolongo | Television role |
| 1990–1993 | Maniac Mansion | Harry the Fly | 65 episodes; also creator, writer, and director |
| 1992 | Partners 'n Love | Lloyd Peters | Television role |
| 1994 | Sodbusters | Cole | Television role; also writer |
| 1997 | Goosebumps | Doctor / SWAT Team Leader | Episode: "Don't Go to Sleep" |
| 1997 | Once a Thief | Master Jamboree | Episode: "It Happened One Night" |
| 1998 | Due South | Van Zant's Cleaner | Episode: "Dead Men Don't Throw Rice" |
| 1998 | Eerie, Indiana: The Other Dimension | Freddie Foster | Episode: "Last Laugh" |
| 2000 | Power Play | Dr. Eugene Tockette | Episode: "The Quarter Finals" |
| 2000 | Relic Hunter | Richard Ferguson | Episode: "Emperor's Bride" |
| 2001–2003 | RoboRoach | Voice | 7 episodes |
| 2002, 2006 | Puppets Who Kill | Good Ol' Joe / Curious Bob | 2 episodes |
| 2004 | Untold Stories of the E.R. | Reenactments | Episode: "The Big Save" |
| 2006 | The Jane Show | Jane's Dad, Dave Black | Episode: "Daddy's Home" |
| 2008–2011 | Little Mosque on the Prairie | George Wispinski / Alvin Wispinski | 3 episodes |
| 2015–2020 | Schitt's Creek | Bob Currie | 29 episodes |
