= Bonnie Hunt =

American actress, comedian, writer and director (born 1961)

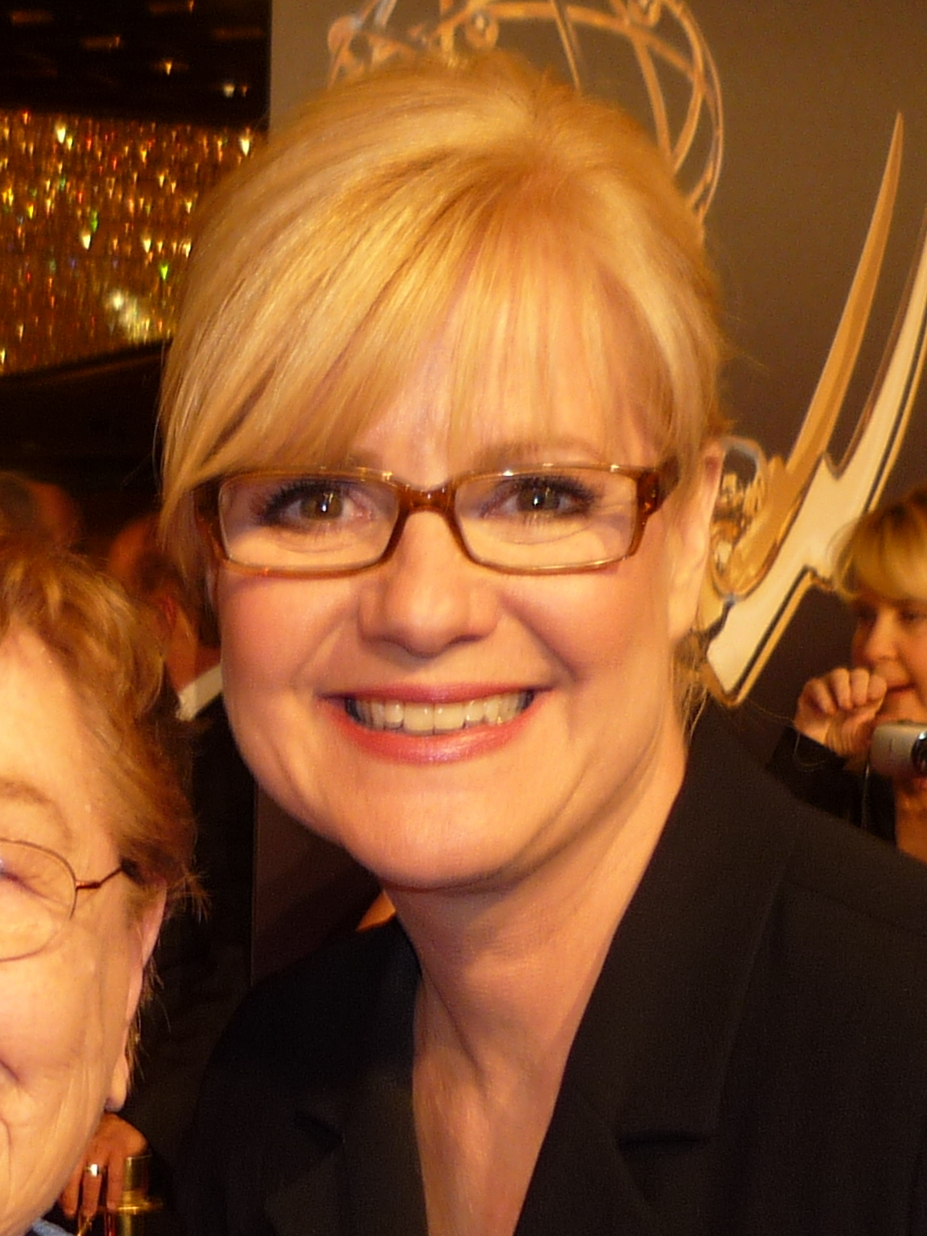
- Hunt in 2010
- Born: September 22, 1961 (age 65); Chicago, Illinois, U.S.
- Occupations: Actress; comedian; director; producer; writer; television host
- Years active: 1984–present
- Spouse: John Murphy (m. 1988; div. 2008)

Comedy career
- Medium: Film; television
- Genre: Improvisational comedy
- Subject: Popular culture

Bonnie Hunt (born September 22, 1961) is an American actress and comedian. Beginning in the 1980s, she gained recognition for supporting roles in films including Rain Man (1988), Beethoven (1992), Beethoven's 2nd (1993), Jumanji (1995), Jerry Maguire (1996), and The Green Mile (1999). Hunt made her directorial debut with the romantic drama Return to Me (2000), in which she also starred.

Hunt achieved wider attention for Life with Bonnie (2002–2004), the ABC sitcom which she co-created, wrote, directed, executive produced and starred in, garnering nominations for two Golden Globes and the Primetime Emmy Award for Outstanding Lead Actress in a Comedy Series. Other series of hers include The Building (1993), Bonnie (1995–1996), and the talk show The Bonnie Hunt Show (2008–2010), which she hosted. The latter earned her a Daytime Emmy Award nomination.

Also a voice actress, Hunt has shifted her focus to animated media, with films such as A Bug's Life (1998) and the franchises Monsters, Inc. (2001–present), Cars (2006–present), Toy Story (2010–present), and Zootopia (2016–present). In 2024, she portrayed Mrs. Claus in the Christmas action film Red One.

== Early life ==
Hunt's father was of Irish and Belgian ancestry and her mother was of Polish descent. She has three older brothers named Patrick, Kevin, and Tom, two older sisters named Cathy and Carol, and a younger sister named Mary. She was educated in Roman Catholic schools, attending Saint Ferdinand School and Notre Dame High School for Girls in Chicago, and worked part-time as a nurse's aide.

In 1982, Hunt worked as an oncology nurse at Northwestern Memorial Hospital in Chicago. In 1984, she co-founded an improvisational comedy troupe called An Impulsive Thing. Hunt also performed as a member of Chicago's world-famous the Second City, joining in 1986.

In 1988, while a nurse, Hunt auditioned on her lunch break for the role of waitress Sally Dibbs in Rain Man and won it.

== Career ==
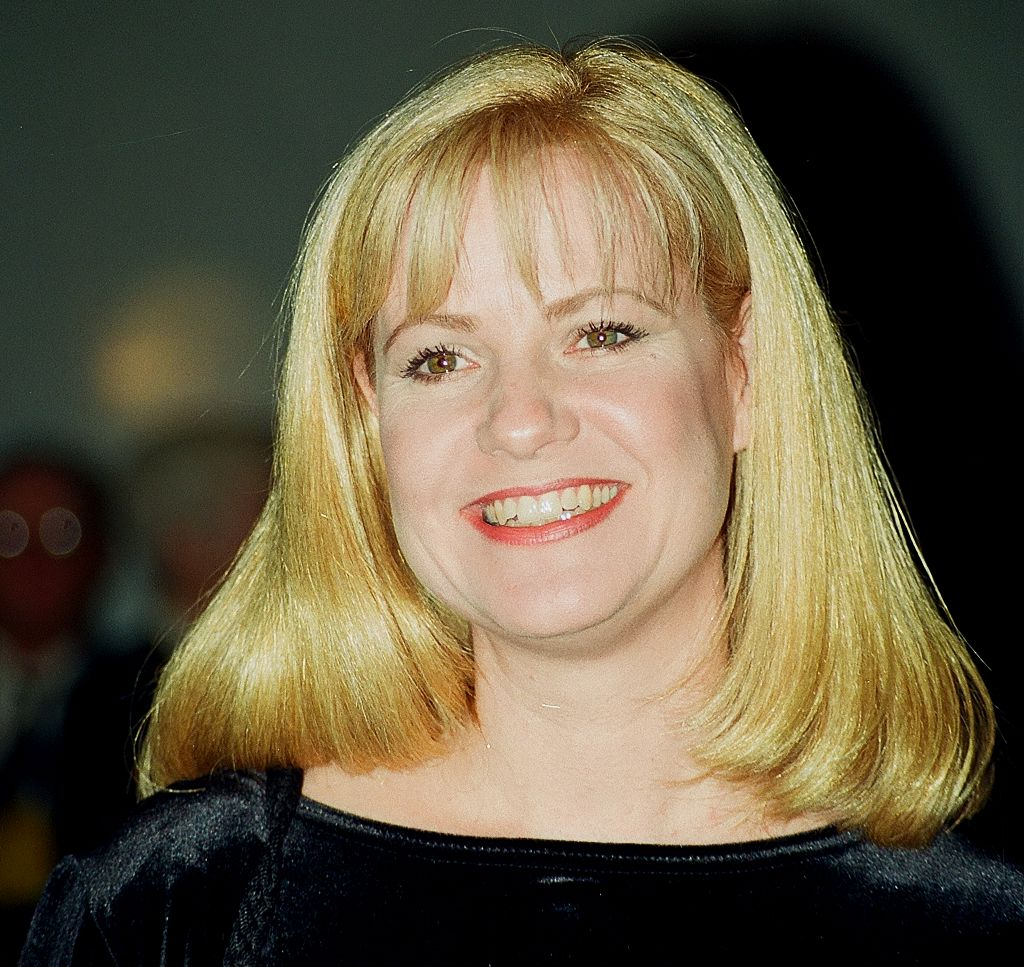
Hunt in 1996

In 1990, Hunt portrayed Carol Anne Smithson in Grand. She refused to become a cast member of Saturday Night Live because the series' producers generally frowned on her preferred improvisational style. In 1991, Hunt joined the cast of Davis Rules as Gwen Davis, for the show's second season. The following year, she was offered the part of BJ Poteet, a replacement character for the departing Allison Sugarbaker, played by Julia Duffy on Designing Women; the part of BJ was ultimately played by Judith Ivey.

In 1993, Hunt teamed with good friend David Letterman to produce The Building. The series was also filmed live; mistakes, accidents, and forgotten lines were often left in the aired episode. In 1995, Hunt and Letterman reteamed for The Bonnie Hunt Show (later retitled Bonnie), which featured many of the same cast members as The Building and the same loose style. The show was praised by critics but was canceled after 11 of the 13 episodes produced were aired. In 2002, Hunt returned to television with Life with Bonnie. Her role on the series earned her a 2004 Emmy nomination (which was her first). Despite fair ratings, the series was canceled in its second season. Hunt announced on Live with Regis and Kelly that ABC had offered her another sitcom, in which she would have portrayed a divorced detective. This pilot titled Let Go (also known as Crimes and Dating) was not picked up for the fall 2006 schedule.

She directed, co-wrote, and co-starred in Return to Me. It was filmed in her Chicago neighborhood and included bit parts for a number of her relatives. The film, which received a positive reception from critics, was largely influenced by Hunt's blue-collar Catholic upbringing in Chicago.

Hunt portrayed Alice Newton in Beethoven and Beethoven's 2nd, Sarah Whittle/Madam Serena in Jumanji, and Kate Baker in Cheaper by the Dozen and Cheaper by the Dozen 2. She portrayed the sister of Renée Zellweger's character in Jerry Maguire and Jan Edgecomb in The Green Mile. She portrayed Grace Bellamy in Loggerheads. She has provided her voice for a total of eight Pixar films: A Bug's Life as Rosie the black widow, Monsters, Inc. as Ms. Flint, Cars, Cars 2, and Cars 3 as Sally Carrera, Toy Story 3 and Toy Story 4 as Dolly, and Monsters University as Karen Graves. In addition, Hunt voiced Bonnie Hopps in the Walt Disney Animation Studios' film, Zootopia, which marked her first non-Pixar animated film, as well as its sequel, Zootopia 2.

=== The Bonnie Hunt Show ===
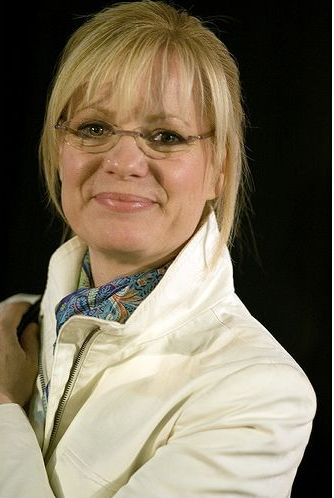
Hunt in 2006

In 2007, Hunt taped a pilot episode for Telepictures. The pilot was approved and the talk show was created. The Bonnie Hunt Show premiered on September 8, 2008. The set design was a tribute to Dean Martin and on the walls are pictures of historic television personalities, as well as Hunt's family members. The series was inspired by the format of Live with Regis and Kelly, with the host and guests often interacting with the audience. Many of the series' staffers were longtime friends of Hunt from Chicago. The series typically started with an opening monologue followed by guest interviews and games played with the audience. Hunt's mother Alice often appeared in webcasts from her home in Chicago. The Bonnie Hunt Show taped in Culver City, California, and was viewed in 17 of the top 20 US television markets in the United States. In its first year, The Bonnie Hunt Show was nominated for three Daytime Emmy Awards, for opening theme, hairstyle, and makeup. It won the Gracie Award for "Outstanding Talk Show" in 2009. In 2010, Hunt was nominated for "Outstanding Talk Show Host" at the Daytime Emmy Awards. The final episode aired on May 26, 2010.

== Personal life ==
In 1988, Hunt married investment banker John Murphy. They separated in 2006, and their divorce was officially finalized two years later.

Hunt is a lifelong Chicago Cubs fan, having not missed an opening day at Wrigley Field since 1977. She was in attendance in Cleveland for the Cubs' historic Game 7 victory during the 2016 World Series.

Hunt is a supporter of the Multiple Myeloma Research Foundation, of which she is an honorary board member.

== Filmography ==
=== Film ===
Year	Title	Role	Notes
1988	Rain Man	Sally Dibbs (the waitress)	
1992	Beethoven	Alice Newton	
1993	Dave	White House Tour Guide	
1993	Beethoven's 2nd	Alice Newton	
1994	Only You	Kate Corvatch	
1995	Now and Then	Mrs. DeWitt	
1995	Jumanji	Sarah Whittle	
1996	Getting Away with Murder	Gail Holland	
1996	Jerry Maguire	Laurel Boyd	
1998	Kissing a Fool	Linda Streicher	
1998	A Bug's Life	Rosie	Voice
1999	Random Hearts	Wendy Judd	
1999	The Green Mile	Jan Edgecomb	
2000	Return to Me	Megan Dayton	Also director and co-writer
2001	Monsters, Inc.	Ms. Flint	Voice
2002	Stolen Summer	Margaret O'Malley	
2003	Cheaper by the Dozen	Kate Baker	
2005	Loggerheads	Grace	
2005	Cheaper by the Dozen 2	Kate Baker	
2006	I Want Someone to Eat Cheese With	Stella Lewis	
2006	Cars	Sally Carrera	Voice; Additional screenplay material
2006	Mater and the Ghostlight	Sally Carrera	Voice; Short film; direct-to-video
2009	Hurricane Season	Principal Durant	
2010	Toy Story 3	Dolly	Voice
2011	Toy Story Toons: Hawaiian Vacation	Dolly	Voice; Short film
2011	Cars 2	Sally Carrera	Voice
2013	Monsters University	Karen Graves	Voice
2016	Zootopia	Bonnie Hopps	Voice
2017	Cars 3	Sally Carrera	Voice
2019	Toy Story 4	Dolly	Voice
2021	The Ultimate Playlist of Noise	Dr. Lubinsky	
2024	Red One	Mrs. Claus	
2025	Zootopia 2	Bonnie Hopps	Voice
2026	Miss You, Love You	Judith Bibbs	
2026	Toy Story 5	Dolly	Voice

=== Television ===
Year	Title	Role	Notes
1984	American Playhouse	Foxtrot Dancer	Episode: "Under the Biltmore Clock"
1990	Grand	Carol Anne Smithson	Main role (26 episodes)
1991–1992	Davis Rules	Gwen Davis	Main role (18 episodes)
1993	The Building	Bonnie Kennedy	Lead role; also creator, executive producer, writer
1995–1996	Bonnie	Bonnie Kelly	Lead role; also co-creator, producer, writer
1997	Wheel of Fortune	Herself	Played alongside her mother Alice
1997	Subway Stories: Tales from the Underground	Fern	Television film; Vignette: "Fern's Heart of Darkness"
2002–2004	Life with Bonnie	Bonnie Molloy	Lead role; also co-creator, director, executive producer, writer
2006	Let Go	Kate Holloway	Unsold ABC pilot; lead role, also director, executive producer, writer
2008–2010	The Bonnie Hunt Show	Herself / Host	Also executive producer, writer
2010	The Life & Times of Tim	Gabe's Mother	Voice; 2 episodes
2013	Call Me Crazy: A Five Film	—N/a	TV film; Director of "Eddie" segment
2013–2014	Cars Toons: Tales From Radiator Springs	Sally Carrera	Voice; Short films: "Hiccups", "The Radiator Springs 500 1/2"
2013–2018	Sofia the First	Aunt Tilly	Voice; Recurring role (7 episodes)
2018	Escape at Dannemora	Catherine Leahy Scott	Miniseries (7 episodes)
2019	Forky Asks a Question	Dolly	Voice; Short film: "What Is a Leader?"
2021–2024	Monsters at Work	Ms. Flint	Voice; 9 episodes
2022	Amber Brown	—N/a	Creator, director, executive producer, writer
2022	Cars on the Road	Sally Carrera	Voice; Short film: "Dino Park"
2022	Zootopia+	Bonnie Hopps	Voice; Short film: "Hopp on Board"
2025	Somebody Feed Phil	Self	S8 E4 "Tbilisi"
2026	The Bear	Sue	S5 E8 "The Original Beef of Chicagoland"
2027	Cars: Lightning Racers	Sally Carrera	Voice; Upcoming series

=== Video games ===
Year	Title	Voice role
1998	A Bug's Life	Rosie
2001	Monsters, Inc. Scream Team	Ms. Flint
2002	Monsters, Inc.	Ms. Flint
2002	Monsters, Inc. Scream Arena	Ms. Flint
2006	Cars	Sally Carrera
2010	Toy Story 3	Dolly

=== Theme park attractions ===
Year	Title	Voice role
2012	Radiator Springs Racers	Sally Carrera

== Awards and nominations ==
Year	Nominated work	Award	Result
1995	Jumanji	Saturn Award for Best Supporting Actress	Won
1996	Bonnie	Viewers for Quality Television Founder's Award	Won
1999	The Green Mile	Blockbuster Entertainment Award for Favorite Supporting Actress – Drama	Nominated
1999	The Green Mile	Screen Actors Guild Award for Outstanding Performance by a Cast in a Motion Picture	Nominated
2003	Life with Bonnie	TCA Award for Outstanding Achievement in Comedy	Nominated
2003	Life with Bonnie	Golden Globe Award for Best Actress – Television Series Musical or Comedy	Nominated
2003	Life with Bonnie	Satellite Award for Best Actress – Television Series Musical or Comedy	Nominated
2004	Life with Bonnie	Primetime Emmy Award for Outstanding Lead Actress in a Comedy Series	Nominated
2004	Life with Bonnie	Golden Globe Award for Best Actress – Television Series Musical or Comedy	Nominated
2004	Life with Bonnie	Satellite Award for Best Actress – Television Series Musical or Comedy	Nominated
2010	The Bonnie Hunt Show	Daytime Emmy Award for Outstanding Talk Show Host	Nominated
