= Life with Bonnie =

- Created by: Bonnie Hunt; Don Lake
- Starring: Bonnie Hunt; Mark Derwin; Charlie Stewart; Marianne Muellerleile; David Alan Grier; Anthony Russell; Holly Wortell; Chris Barnes; Frankie Ryan Manriquez; Samantha Browne-Walters (Season 1)
- Composer: Nicholas Pike
- Country of origin: United States
- Original language: English
- No. of seasons: 2
- No. of episodes: 44

Production
- Running time: 30 minutes
- Production companies: Bob & Alice Productions; Touchstone Television

Original release
- Network: ABC
- Release: September 17, 2002 – April 9, 2004

Life with Bonnie is an ABC adult television sitcom that originally aired from September 17, 2002, to April 9, 2004. The show outlined the life of the title character Bonnie Malloy, who juggled her personal life and her job as a daytime TV talk show host. The series was created by Bonnie Hunt and Don Lake and produced by Bob & Alice Productions, in association with Touchstone Television. The series had fair ratings in the first season, but struggled in the second season, resulting in its cancellation. Life with Bonnie was also shown on Living TV in the United Kingdom.

== Cast and characters ==
The cast in a promotional photo for season 2

=== Main ===
- Bonnie Hunt as Bonnie Malloy, the mother of 2 children (three in season 1), a loving wife, and host of a local talk show. Bonnie tries to maintain a public image of the perfect wife and mother, but in reality her life is chaotic.
- Mark Derwin as Mark Malloy, a doctor, Bonnie's husband, and the father of their children. He looks on as she tries to balance her hectic life. Mark is much less concerned about what other people think than Bonnie is, which causes problems on occasion. He has a generally more professional demeanor, and sometimes does not understand why Bonnie continues to put up with annoying people in her life.
- Charlie Stewart as Charlie Malloy, Bonnie's son. Charlie shares most of his scenes with his friend Frankie. His role is small and usually unscripted, although he adds comedy to the show.
- Samantha Browne-Walters as Samantha Malloy (season 1), Bonnie's eldest child, yet another ingredient in Bonnie's hectic life. She was removed without explanation from the cast when season two started.
- Marianne Muellerleile as Gloria, Bonnie's live-in housekeeper/nanny. She was only intended to stay there until Charlie Malloy started school, but despite the fact that she actually provided little help, they could not let her leave because they had grown attached to her.
- David Alan Grier as David Bellows, the producer of the Morning Chicago show. David is most often seen yelling and frantically rushing to get things for the show in order while pushing his lectern around the studio.
- Anthony Russell as Tony Russo, Bonnie's affable piano player on Morning Chicago. Bonnie's housekeeper, Gloria, has a crush on Tony.
- Holly Wortell as Holly, Bonnie's make-up artist on Morning Chicago. She often gives advice on Bonnie's marriage issues and seems to date many men.
- Chris Barnes as Marv, the cue-card guy on Morning Chicago. Marv is very protective of Holly, who does not return his interest.
- Frankie Ryan Manriquez as Frankie, Charlie's best friend who spends most of his time at the Malloy home. He contributes many funny anecdotes about his screwed-up family.

=== Special guest stars ===
- Rip Taylor as "Rappin' Rip" (4 episodes)
- Carl Reiner as Mr. Portinbody (3 episodes)
- David Duchovny as Johnny Volcano (2 episodes)
- Martin Mull as Le Nord (2 episodes)
- Tom Hanks as Himself (episode: "What If?")
- Teri Garr as Mrs. Portinbody (episode: "Buy the Book")
- Jack LaLanne as Himself (season 2 premiere)
- The Smothers Brothers as The Contractors (episode: "Everything Old Is New Again")
- Dick Van Patten as Himself (episode: "It's a Wonderful Job")
- Jonathan Winters as Q.T. Marlens, a writer with multiple personalities (season 1, episode 9)
- Robin Williams as Kevin Powalski (episode: "Psychic")
- Morgan York as Christine Harris (episode: "Dare to Be Different")

== Episodes ==
Season	Episodes	Originally released	
Season	Episodes	First released	Last released
1	22	September 17, 2002	March 25, 2003
2	22	September 26, 2003	April 9, 2004

=== Season 1 (2002–03) ===
No. overall	No. in season	Title	Directed by	Written by	Original release date	Prod. code	Viewers (millions)
1	1	"Pilot"	Bonnie Hunt	Bonnie Hunt & Don Lake	September 17, 2002	B–230	16.12
2	2	"Weather or Not"	John Bowab	Bonnie Hunt & Don Lake	September 24, 2002	B–231	11.29
3	3	"Dream"	John Bowab	Bonnie Hunt & Don Lake	October 1, 2002	B–232	11.08
4	4	"Don't Act Your Age, Just Act"	Bonnie Hunt	Bonnie Hunt & Don Lake	October 8, 2002	B–234	10.09
5	5	"Duets"	Bonnie Hunt	Bonnie Hunt & Don Lake	October 15, 2002	B–236	9.26
6	6	"Is It Just Us?"	Bonnie Hunt	Bonnie Hunt & Don Lake	October 22, 2002	B–235	10.25
7	7	"A Day in the Life"	Bonnie Hunt	Bonnie Hunt & Don Lake	October 29, 2002	B–237	10.25
8	8	"Happy Day"	Bonnie Hunt	Bonnie Hunt & Don Lake	November 5, 2002	B–238	9.04
9	9	"Money Plus Marlens Makes Four"	Bonnie Hunt	Bonnie Hunt & Don Lake	November 12, 2002	B–239	8.50
10	10	"Partly Sunny"	Bonnie Hunt	Bonnie Hunt & Don Lake	November 19, 2002	B–240	8.42
11	11	"What If?"	Bonnie Hunt	Bonnie Hunt & Don Lake	November 26, 2002	B–242	9.79
12	12	"Christmastime in the City"	Bonnie Hunt	Bonnie Hunt & Don Lake	December 10, 2002	B–243	9.71
13	13	"Okay, Thanks"	Bonnie Hunt	Bonnie Hunt & Don Lake	December 17, 2002	B–241	10.41
14	14	"Deuce Is Wild"	Bonnie Hunt	Bonnie Hunt & Don Lake	January 7, 2003	B–244	9.17
15	15	"Assaulted Nuts"	John Bowab	Bonnie Hunt & Don Lake	January 14, 2003	B–233	7.83
16	16	"Psychic"	Bonnie Hunt	Bonnie Hunt & Don Lake	February 4, 2003	B–245	9.01
17	17	"The Graduate"	Bonnie Hunt	Bonnie Hunt & Don Lake	February 11, 2003	B–247	7.55
18	18	"Buy the Book"	Bonnie Hunt	Bonnie Hunt & Don Lake	February 18, 2003	B–248	8.51
19	19	"In Need of Assistants"	Bonnie Hunt	Bonnie Hunt & Don Lake	March 11, 2003	B–246	7.21
20	20	"Stealing Home"	Bonnie Hunt	Bonnie Hunt & Don Lake	March 18, 2003	B–250	6.48
21	21	"Ding, Ding, Ding Went the Truth"	Bonnie Hunt	Bonnie Hunt & Don Lake	March 25, 2003	B–249	7.23
22	22	"Till Next Time"	Bonnie Hunt	Bonnie Hunt & Don Lake	March 25, 2003	B–251	7.23

=== Season 2 (2003–04) ===
No. overall	No. in season	Title	Directed by	Written by	Original release date	Prod. code	Viewers (millions)
23	1	"Ironing Out Our Differences"	Bonnie Hunt	Bonnie Hunt & Don Lake	September 26, 2003	B–252	9.83
24	2	"Pontiac Bonnie-Ville"	Bonnie Hunt	Bonnie Hunt & Don Lake	October 3, 2003	B–253	8.06
25	3	"Everything Old Is New Again"	Bonnie Hunt	Bonnie Hunt & Don Lake	October 10, 2003	B–254	7.46
26	4	"No Matter Where You Go, There You Are"	Bonnie Hunt	Bonnie Hunt & Don Lake	October 17, 2003	B–255	8.33
27	5	"Boyhood to Womanhood"	Bonnie Hunt	Bonnie Hunt & Don Lake	October 24, 2003	B–256	8.02
28	6	"The Merry Ole Land of Oz"	Bonnie Hunt	Bonnie Hunt & Don Lake	October 31, 2003	B–257	7.20
29	7	"Places, Stat!"	Bonnie Hunt	Bonnie Hunt & Don Lake	November 7, 2003	B–258	8.93
30	8	"Queer Eye for the Straight Lie"	Bonnie Hunt	Bonnie Hunt & Don Lake	November 14, 2003	B–259	7.72
31	9	"Boomerang"	Bonnie Hunt	Bonnie Hunt & Don Lake	November 21, 2003	B–260	8.33
32	10	"Food for Thought"	Bonnie Hunt	Bonnie Hunt & Don Lake	December 5, 2003	B–261	7.95
33	11	"It's a Wonderful Job"	Bonnie Hunt	Bonnie Hunt & Don Lake	December 12, 2003	B–262	7.30
34	12	"Trifecta, Try Friendship"	Bonnie Hunt	Bonnie Hunt & Don Lake	January 9, 2004	B–263	8.27
35	13	"Live and Let Live"	Bonnie Hunt	Bonnie Hunt & Don Lake	January 23, 2004	B–264	8.69
36	14	"Space Heaters"	Bonnie Hunt	Bonnie Hunt & Don Lake	January 30, 2004	B–267	8.05
37	15	"Dare to Be Different"	Bonnie Hunt	Bonnie Hunt & Don Lake	February 13, 2004	B–265	7.50
38	16	"Nightshift"	Bonnie Hunt	Bonnie Hunt & Don Lake	February 20, 2004	B–266	6.53
39	17	"Act Natural"	Bonnie Hunt	Bonnie Hunt & Don Lake	February 27, 2004	B–269	7.22
40	18	"Therabeautic"	Bonnie Hunt	Bonnie Hunt & Don Lake	March 5, 2004	B–270	6.98
41	19	"Striking a Match"	Bonnie Hunt	Bonnie Hunt & Don Lake	March 19, 2004	B–268	6.48
42	20	"Don't Stress, Express"	Bonnie Hunt	Bonnie Hunt & Don Lake	March 26, 2004	B–273	6.93
43	21	"Nip, Tuck and Roll"	Bonnie Hunt	Bonnie Hunt & Don Lake	April 2, 2004	B–272	6.50
44	22	"Father and Son: A Table for Two"	Bonnie Hunt	Bonnie Hunt & Don Lake	April 9, 2004	B–271	6.46
