= Perry Rosemond =

Canadian television director (1936–2026)

- Born: 15 November 1936; Winnipeg, Manitoba, Canada
- Died: 20 August 2026 (aged 89); Toronto, Ontario, Canada
- Occupations: Television writer, producer and director
- Years active: 1956–2013

Perry Rosemond, CM (15 November 1936 – 20 August 2026) was a Canadian television writer, producer and director.

== Life and career ==
Born in Winnipeg, Manitoba, Canada, Rosemond has created, produced, written and directed international television for over forty years. His efforts, notably Royal Canadian Air Farce and King of Kensington, have been rewarded with the Order of Canada in his home country, and the George Foster Peabody Award in the United States. Most recently, he executive-produced When Jews Were Funny, which was named 'Best Canadian Feature Film' at the 2013 Toronto International Film Festival.

Rosemond began his fascination with the arts as a stage and television performer in Winnipeg and Toronto. At age 18 he was a founding member of John Hirsch's Manitoba Theatre Centre. He continued his pursuit of the arts as a television producer director and writer. His A&E production of the Broadway play Cold Storage starring Len Cariou and Martin Balsam earned him the ACE Award. This was followed by screen adaptations of Breakfast with Les and Bess starring Dick Van Dyke and Cloris Leachman and Some Men Need Help with Treat Williams and Philip Bosco. He produced the PBS television series Meeting of Minds which earned the Peabody Award.

Work in the United States has included the PBS series, Freestyle, a groundbreaking series on androgyny; the four-hour ABC Silver Anniversary Celebration featuring Julie Andrews and John Wayne; the situation comedy Good Times; series and specials for Steve Martin, Billy Crystal, Tom Jones, Richard Pryor, Donny and Marie, Dean Martin, Howie Mandel and Johnny Cash; and Hollywood's Most Sensational Mysteries, including dramatizations of the lives of Marilyn Monroe and Ava Gardner. Syndicated series include Norm Crosby's Comedy Shop and Starting from Scratch, starring Bill Daily and Connie Stevens.

As head of CBC Television's School and Pre-School programs, he created and produced Through the Eyes of Tomorrow, a show that featured high school students at every level of production and inspired many teens to enter the field of broadcast journalism, and Children of the World for CBC, PBS and the United Nations. It examined the lives of children in developing nations and was seen by a worldwide audience of 600 million. It won the Japan Prize as 'Best Children's Program' and remains one of Rosemond's proudest achievements.

He was executive producer of the landmark children's shows Mr. Dressup and The Friendly Giant and when CBC was allowed to alter the look of Sesame Street, he produced and wrote a Canadian edition of the series that included segments reflecting bilingual Canadians and First Nations Canadians. He created and wrote the very first telecasts for TVOntario and directed several episodes in the first season of Jim Henson's Fraggle Rock.

In the area of documentary and Public Affairs, he produced the CBC flagship series The Way It Is, and the ACTRA award-winning three-part documentary series Centennial. He directed profiles for CBC's Telescope series of Oscar Peterson, Arthur Hailey, Gordon Pinsent, Glenn Gould, Ray Bradbury and Donald Sutherland among others. NBC documentaries include "The Silver Ghetto" on the problems of aging in America, and "No Place To Die", on overpopulation. He also scripted "Outer City: Inner Conflict" for the US Commission on Civil Rights and "A White House Salute to Agriculture". As president of Molstar Productions, Rosemond oversaw the production of Hockey Night in Canada, the Molson Indy and the Molson Grand Prix.

Rosemond was asked to create a new comedy series for CBC and developed King of Kensington. He cast Al Waxman in the title role and chose Fiona Reid to play his wife. The ACTRA Award winning series ran for five seasons and became part of Canadian television history. On CTV's The David Steinberg Show, he gave television debuts to many performers, including: John Candy, Andrea Martin, Martin Short, Joe Flaherty and Dave Thomas. Perry was a writer-story editor on both series and has written in excess of two hundred scripts.

He executive produced the Juno Awards, the Genie Awards and A Tribute to Gilda Radner in aid of ovarian cancer research. Rosemond received an ACTRA Award nomination for A Gala Evening at Expo with the Prince and Princess of Wales in attendance and an ACE Award nomination for the CBC/Showtime special Mike MacDonald in Concert. In 1988 he produced The Calgary Olympics Arts Festival starring Anne Murray. One of the most popular programs on Canadian television is Royal Canadian Air Farce and Rosemond directed it for fifteen seasons.

Rosemond died on 20 August 2026, at the age of 89.

== Education ==
After receiving his Bachelor of Arts degree from the University of Manitoba, Perry did post-graduate studies in television production at the Ryerson University. He has taught television production and writing skills at Humber College and Seneca College, Toronto, University of Southern California in Los Angeles and Brigham Young University in Salt Lake City, Utah, among others. Perry served on the advisory committee of The Humber School of Comedy and The Walrus magazine. He was a founding board member of the International Jewish Sports Hall of Fame.
