= John Bowab =

American theatre director and television director

- Born: December 22, 1933 (age 91)
- Occupation(s): Theatre director, television director
- Years active: 1966–2008

John Bowab (born December 22, 1933) is an American theatre director and television director.

== Early life ==
Bowab was born to a Syrian immigrant family, and grew up in Pawtucket, Rhode Island.

== Career ==
Bowab began his career in theatre, directing a number of stage productions, such as Mame (1983), The Night of the Hunter (2003), and most recently 70, Girls, 70 (2010).

In the late 1970s, he moved on to television, amassing a number of directing credits. Some of these include The Cosby Show, Benson, Bosom Buddies, Gimme a Break!, Small Wonder, Making a Living, Full House, Who's the Boss?, The Facts of Life, Family Matters, Double Trouble, Too Close for Comfort, Ellen, among other series.
