= Golden Hits of the Smothers Brothers, Vol. 2 =

Greatest hits album by Smothers Brothers
- Released: July 1966
- Genre: Comedy, folk
- Label: Mercury

Smothers Brothers chronology
The Smothers Brothers Play It Straight (1966)	Golden Hits of the Smothers Brothers, Vol. 2 (1966)	Smothers Brothers Comedy Hour (1968)

Golden Hits of the Smothers Brothers, Vol. 2 (released July 1966) is the Smothers Brothers' first greatest hits album. There is no Volume 1, but all of the routines had been performed on earlier comedy albums by the duo. These are not the same performances contained on other albums, making it a "new" album. There was not a true hits collection for the duo until Sibling Revelry: The Best of the Smothers Brothers released in 1988.

== Track listing ==
1. "Cabbage" (10:27) version of "Boil Them Cabbage Down"– Dick asks Tom to "Take it" and Tom says "No." Also includes the idea that there are pumas in crevices in America – previously performed on The Two Sides of the Smothers Brothers
2. "Church Bells" (2:58) – Song about the bells of a Catholic church, a Protestant church, and Synagogue during which Dick mistakenly describes "the little sliver bell" of the Synagogue. Previously performed on Curb Your Tongue, Knave where the mistake is "Catholic Chowers."
3. "My Old Man" (4:32) – Previously performed on Think Ethnic!
4. "Intermission Bit" (1:25)
5. "Michael, Row Your Boat Ashore" (6:38) – The boys get the audience to sing along and then hum along, but Dick draws the line at everybody "ah-ing." Tom notes that if they sing loud enough even Ralph (the angel who was Tom's boss on the short lived situation comedy The Smothers Brothers Show) might hear them – previously performed on It Must Have Been Something I Said!
6. "I Talk to the Trees" (5:05) – Dick tries to sing the showtune from Paint Your Wagon only to be stopped by Tom's declaration it is a "stupid song." Previously performed on Curb Your Tongue, Knave; a third version that plays off the others is found on Smothers Brothers Comedy Hour (Album)
7. "Hangman" (1:22) – Previously performed on The Two Sides of the Smothers Brothers
8. "Pretoria" (5:39) – The audience gets to join in on singing the old hit by The Weavers. Previously performed on The Smothers Brothers at the Purple Onion

== Personnel ==
- Dick Smothers – vocals, double bass
- Tom Smothers – vocals, guitar
