= Sibling Revelry: The Best of the Smothers Brothers =

Greatest hits album by the Smothers Brothers
- Released: March 3, 1988
- Genre: Comedy, folk
- Label: Rhino
- Producer: David Carroll

The Smothers Brothers chronology
Golden Hits of the Smothers Brothers, Vol. 2 (1966)	Sibling Revelry: The Best of the Smothers Brothers (1988)

Professional ratings
Review scores
Source	Rating
Allmusic	link

Sibling Revelry: The Best of the Smothers Brothers is a compilation album released by Rhino Records in 1988. A 1998 CD re-issue added "Cabbage", "Michael Row Your Boat Ashore" and "You Didn't Come In"/"Tommy's Song" as bonus tracks. The album contains at least one track from each of their previous albums with the exception of The Smothers Brothers Play It Straight.

== Track listing ==
1. "Pretoria" – originally released on The Smothers Brothers at the Purple Onion
2. "Tom Dooley" – originally released on The Smothers Brothers at the Purple Onion
3. "Chocolate" – originally released on The Two Sides of the Smothers Brothers
4. "Laredo" – originally released on The Two Sides of the Smothers Brothers
5. "Daniel Boone" – originally released on Think Ethnic
6. "The Saga of John Henry" – originally released on Think Ethnic
7. "Gnus" – originally released on Curb Your Tongue, Knave
8. "Crabs Walk Sideways" – originally released on It Must Have Been Something I Said!
9. "Jenny Brown" – originally released on It Must Have Been Something I Said!
10. "The Military Lovers" – originally released on Tour de Farce: American History and Other Unrelated Subjects
11. "Mediocre Fred" – originally released on Tour de Farce: American History and Other Unrelated Subjects
12. "Mom Always Liked You Best" – originally released on Mom Always Liked You Best!
13. "You Can Call Me Stupid" – originally released on Mom Always Liked You Best!
14. "I Talk to the Trees" – this version is from Golden Hits of the Smothers Brothers, Vol. 2
15. "Hangman" – another remade version from Golden Hits of the Smothers Brothers, Vol. 2
16. "Cabbage" – another remade version from Golden Hits of the Smothers Brothers, Vol. 2
17. "Michael, Row Your Boat Ashore" – another remade version from Golden Hits of the Smothers Brothers, Vol. 2
18. "You Didn't Come In" ("I Talk to the Trees") – originally released on Smothers Brothers Comedy Hour
19. "Tommy's Song" – Not listed among the tracks, as it immediately follows "You Didn't Come In" from The Smothers Brothers Comedy Hour album and is included as part of that track

== Personnel ==
- Dick Smothers – vocals, double bass
- Tom Smothers – vocals, guitar
