= Smothers Brothers Comedy Hour (album) =

Compilation album by Smothers Brothers
- Released: 1968
- Genre: Comedy, folk
- Label: Mercury

Smothers Brothers chronology
Golden Hits of the Smothers Brothers, Vol. 2 (1966)	Smothers Brothers Comedy Hour (1968)	Sibling Revelry: The Best of the Smothers Brothers (1988)

Smothers Brothers Comedy Hour (the first release of this album lists it as Smothers Comedy Brothers Hour on the label, similar to the show's logo on the front cover) is a 1968 comedy album released on Mercury Records by the Smothers Brothers consisting of bits from their CBS television series The Smothers Brothers Comedy Hour. As a result, much of the album consists of political humor, which was absent from their previous recording efforts but remained true to their television show's content. It reached number 164 on the Billboard Pop Albums chart.

== Track listing ==
1. "Morons" (0:58) – Tom explains his theory that power in government exists in relationship to the amount of clothing you wear.
2. "Troubador Song" (7:54) – Dick tries to sing a madrigal but Tom keeps making "cheep cheep" bird sounds.
3. "Smart Juice" (0:57) – Tom gives Dick a taste of his Smart Juice.
4. "President Johnson" (0:47) – Tom offers President Johnson political advice.
5. "You Didn't Come In" (3:42) – Once again Dick tries to sing "I Talk to the Trees" from the musical Paint Your Wagon; this was the third time the brothers recorded this routine, with earlier versions on Curb Your Tongue, Knave and Golden Hits of the Smothers Brothers, Vol. 2. However, this time it is Dick who stops because Tom always interrupts and ruins the song; but this time he did not—revealing that Dick never learned the whole song.
6. "Tommy's Song" (1:32) – When all is said and done, Tom should have been a nun.
7. "Tom's Party" (0:58) – Tom invites everybody to a party (at Dick's house).
8. "Caught in the Draft" (1:00) – More political commentary from Tom.
9. "The Impossible Dream (The Quest)" (7:52) – In trying to put the lesson from the hit song from the musical "Man of La Mancha" into his own words, Tom tells the story of lovely, courageous Joan of Arc who built an ark to save all of the animals from the Great Flood.
10. "Spread of Democracy" (1:50)
11. "United Nations" (1:15)
12. "Controversial Material" (6:12) – Tom chastises Dick for the political incorrectness of old songs such as "(Potatoes Are Cheaper--Tomatoes Are Cheaper) Now's The Time to Fall in Love", "Chicago (That Toddling Town)", and "McNamara's Band."

== Personnel ==
- Dick Smothers – vocals, double bass
- Tom Smothers – vocals, guitar

== Chart positions ==
Year	Chart	Position
1968	Billboard Pop Albums	164
