= The Smothers Brothers Play It Straight =

Studio album by The Smothers Brothers
- Released: February 15, 1966
- Genre: Folk
- Label: Mercury
- Producer: David Carroll; Kenneth Fritz; Mason Williams

The Smothers Brothers chronology
Mom Always Liked You Best! (1965)	The Smothers Brothers Play It Straight (1966)	Golden Hits of the Smothers Brothers, Vol. 2 (1966)

Professional ratings
Review scores
Source	Rating
Allmusic	link

The Smothers Brothers Play It Straight is the ninth album by the Smothers Brothers (released February 15, 1966, on Mercury Records). As the title indicates, the folk comedy duo were singing the songs "straight" (well, "Almost"). Like the B-side of their second album, Two Sides of the Smothers Brothers, the recording was done in a studio instead of on stage. The album cover shows Tom standing with his guitar and Dick sitting on a stool with his bass lying behind him. There is also a chicken eating chicken-feed, which could be a representation of Frank, Tom's wagon-pulling chicken who is discussed on Mom Always Liked You Best!.

== Track listing ==
1. "Lark Day" (2:47) – Sung by Tom & Dick
2. "The First Time Ever I Saw Your Face" (3:10) – Sung by Dick
3. "Yesterday" (2:31) – Sung by Dick
4. "Little Sacka Sugar" (1:54 ) – Sung by Tom
5. "Someone to Talk My Troubles To" (3:11) – Sung by Tom & Dick
6. "Wanderlove" (4:12) – Sung by Dick and written by Mason Williams, who performed it on his The Mason Williams Phonograph Record album
7. "Hound Dog Blues" (2:41) – Sung and written by Tom
8. "Down in the Valley" (3:58) – Sung by Tom & Dick, using their arrangement previously recorded on The Smothers Brothers at the Purple Onion
9. "The Write of Songs" (2:41) – Sung by Dick
10. "Silver Threads and Golden Needles" (2:25) – Sung by Tom
11. "People Change" (2:43) – Sung by Dick
12. "They Are Gone" (2:34) – Sung by Tom & Dick
13. "Almost" (5:34) – Dick tries to sing it...

== Personnel ==
- Dick Smothers – vocals, double bass
- Tom Smothers – vocals, guitar
- David Carroll – conductor
- Mason Williams – musical director
- Warren Baker, Dick Reynolds – arrangements
