= Aesop's Fables (album) =

Aesop's Fables: The Smothers Brothers Way

Studio album by Smothers Brothers
- Released: March 15, 1965
- Genre: Comedy, folk
- Label: Mercury

Smothers Brothers chronology
Tour de Farce: American History and Other Unrelated Subjects (1964)	Aesop's Fables: The Smothers Brothers Way (1965)	Mom Always Liked You Best! (1965)

Professional ratings
Review scores
Source	Rating
Allmusic	4/5 stars

Aesop's Fables: The Smothers Brothers Way is the seventh comedy album by the Smothers Brothers (released March 15, 1965, on Mercury Records). It reached number 57 on the Billboard Pop Albums chart. Seven of Aesop's more famous stories and morals are related in this album (or what are intended to be his fables but are often overshadowed by the bickering of the two brothers). The songs were written by John McCarthy.

The physical album has long been out of print, but is currently available in digital stores such as iTunes and Amazon Music. However, on the first track ("Overture – Aesop's Fables Our Way"), approximately 47 seconds of the beginning are missing for unknown reasons

== Track listing ==
1. "Overture – Aesop's Fables Our Way" (2:03)
2. "The Greedy Dog" (2:20)
3. "A Fox (Maybe I'd Better Stay Me)" (0:24) – Running gag throughout the record where Tom wishes he could be something else but then something happens to quickly convince him that maybe he had better stay himself.
4. "The Boy Who Cried Wolf" (4:52)
5. "A Fly (Maybe I'd Better Stay Me)" (0:21)
6. "The Dog and the Thief" (3:20)
7. "A Worm (Maybe I'd Better Stay Me)" (0:20)
8. "The Farmer and His Sons" (4:26)
9. "The Fox and Grapes"
10. "A Jellyfish (Maybe I'd Better Stay Me)" (0:15)
11. "The Bird and the Jar" (6:23) – Explores the saying "Necessity is the mother of invention."
12. "A Mosquito (Maybe I'd Better Stay Me)" (0:21)
13. "The Two Frogs" (4:24)
14. "A Car (Maybe I'd Better Stay Me)" (0:45)
15. "Aesop Knew (Reprise)" (1:49)

== Personnel ==
- Dick Smothers – vocals, double bass
- Tom Smothers – vocals, guitar

== Chart positions ==
Year	Chart	Position
1965	Billboard Pop Albums	57
