= Sibling rivalry (disambiguation) =

Sibling rivalry is a type of competition or animosity among brothers and sisters.

Sibling Rivalry may also refer to:

== Music ==
- Sibling Rivalry (The Doobie Brothers album)
- Sibling Rivalry (The Rowans album)
- Sibling Rivalry, a group featuring Joey Ramone
- "Sibling Rivalry", a track from the 1990 album The Simpsons Sing the Blues

== Film and television ==
- Sibling Rivalry (film), a 1990 comedy film
- "Sibling Rivalry" (Even Stevens), a 2001 television episode
- "Sibling Rivalry" (Family Guy), a 2006 television episode
- "Sibling Rivalry" (Shameless), a 2011 television episode

== See also ==
- Sibling rivalry in animals
- Sibling Revelry: The Best of the Smothers Brothers, a compilation album
