= Glory be to God on High =

Glory be to God on High can refer to:

- A translation of Gloria in excelsis Deo from Latin into English, which has spawned different versions with different melodies and lyrics
- A remake of "Michael, Row the Boat Ashore", with different lyrics but the same melody
