= I Talk to the Trees =

I Talk to the Trees may refer to:

- "I Talk to the Trees" (song), American popular song from Lerner and Loewe 1951 musical Paint Your Wagon
- "I Talk to the Trees", song-based comedy sketch by Smothers Brothers on 1963 album Curb Your Tongue, Knave!
- "I Talk to the Trees" (The Good Life), a 1976 British television sitcom episode
