= Mom Always Liked You Best! =

Live album by Smothers Brothers
- Released: August 17, 1965
- Recorded: The Troubadour, Los Angeles, California; The Golden Bear, Huntington Beach, California; Flamingo Hotel, Las Vegas, Nevada
- Genre: Comedy, folk
- Label: Mercury

Smothers Brothers chronology
Aesop's Fables (1965)	Mom Always Liked You Best! (1965)	The Smothers Brothers Play It Straight (1966)

"Mom Always Liked You Best!" is the eighth comedy album by the Smothers Brothers (released August 17, 1965, on Mercury Records). It reached number 39 on the Billboard Pop Albums chart. The album was recorded at The Troubadour in Los Angeles, California, The Golden Bear in Huntington Beach, California, and the Flamingo Hotel in Las Vegas, Nevada.

The cover photograph shows Dick surrounded by a dog, a wagon, a scooter and many other toys while Tom is sitting there with just his chicken, Frank, thereby justifying the title as a word balloon. The album is dedicated to the Smothers Brothers' producer David Carroll and the comments on the back were written by Jack Benny.

== Track listing ==
1. "Mom Always Liked You Best" (4:43) – Tom and Dick fight.
2. "Impersonation" (1:17)
3. "The Three Song" (2:44) – Written for the two of them by Mason Williams.
4. "Little Known Song and Dance" (3:22) – "Songs about diseases" (The Scurvy Song)
5. "The World I Used To Know" (3:29) – by Rod McKuen
6. "My Favorite Holiday" (0:58)
7. "You Can Call Me Stupid" (2:43) – Continues the fight from the first track.
8. "We Love Us" (2:26) – Tom recites a love poem he's written.
9. "Longtime Blues" (3:18) – Another Mason Williams song.
10. "Tattoo Song" (3:44)
11. "Santa Claus" (0:36) – Tom's version of "Santa Claus is Coming to Town" ends rather ironically.
12. "The Last Great Waltz" (4:11) – A song about Jonathan W. Astor who meets the perfect waltz partner.
13. "Reminiscences" (2:33) – Tom reminisces about Dick's wedding, with Tom loudly claiming that Dick had refused to let him be the best man. What may have been the largest recorded laugh the duo ever provoked came in this track. Tom says that after the wedding, everyone went upstairs to the "conception". Dick states, over the large laughter, that it was a nice, normal "reception". Tom then finishes off the audience by sheepishly saying, "I must have been in the wrong room." (Based on an actual incident involving a little girl at a wedding Tom attended.)

== Personnel ==
- Dick Smothers – vocals, double bass
- Tom Smothers – vocals, guitar
- Mason Williams – Accompanist

== Chart positions ==
Year	Chart	Position
1966	Billboard Pop Albums	39
