= Cindy (folk song) =

American folk song

"Cindy" or "Cindy, Cindy" (Roud 836) is a popular American folk song. According to John Lomax, the song originated in North Carolina. In the early and middle 20th century, "Cindy" was included in the songbooks used in many elementary school music programs as an example of folk music. One of the earliest versions of "Cindy" is found in Anne Virginia Culbertson's collection of African American folktales (At the Big House, where Aunt Nancy and Aunt 'Phrony Held Forth on the Animal Folks, Bobbs-Merrill, 1904) where one of her characters, Tim, "sang a plantation song named 'Cindy Ann'," the first verse and refrain of which are:

I'se gwine down ter Richmond
I'll tell you w'a hit's for:
I'se gwine down ter Richmond
Fer ter try an' end dis war
An'-a you good-by, Cindy, Cindy
Good-by, Cindy Ann
An'-a you good-by, Cindy, Cindy
I'se gwine ter Rappahan

As with many folk songs, each singer was free to add verses, and many did. In addition, as Byron Arnold and Bob Halli noted in An Alabama Songbook, performers could swap verses with those of other songs, including "Old Joe Clark" and "Boil Them Cabbage Down".

The tune is taken from the spiritual "The Gospel Train", also known as "Get on Board Little Children".

== Recordings ==
Buddy Kaye, Benjamin Weisman, Dolores Fuller and Fred Wise wrote a version of "Cindy" called "Cindy, Cindy". This version is the familiar one recorded by such performers as Elvis Presley, Johnny Cash, Ricky Nelson, Warren Zevon, Nick Cave (in a duet with Johnny Cash), and others. Bing Crosby included the song in a medley on his album 101 Gang Songs (1961). Mack Wilberg's choral arrangement of the piece was written for four-hand piano, double eight-part choirs, a string bass, xylophone, and a score of quintessential Americana instruments to supplement the melody during the arrangement's hoedown section. Wilberg also wrote a special arrangement to be performed by the Tabernacle Choir at Temple Square. The choral parts are the same, but the accompaniment has been rewritten for full orchestra (specifically the Orchestra at Temple Square). Robert Plant featured an arrangement titled "Cindy, I'll Marry You Someday" on his 2010 album Band of Joy.

Modern versions of the song include modified lyrics, such as the following:

You ought to see my Cindy
She lives way down South
And she's so sweet the honey bees
All swarm around her mouth

Get along home Cindy, Cindy
Get along home Cindy, Cindy
Get along home Cindy, Cindy
I'll marry you some day

Steve Miller recorded a version of the song in an uptempo new wave rock song retitled “Get On Home” with some new lyrics on verses two and three plus a guitar solo on The Steve Miller Band’s 1981 album Circle of Love.

== In film and television ==
- Van Johnson sings part of it in the 1956 movie Miracle in the Rain.
- The song is performed in the 1957 episode of Maverick, "Hostage" by Don Durant.
- The song is performed in the 1959 John Wayne movie Rio Bravo, by Dean Martin, Ricky Nelson, and Walter Brennan. Nelson had previously performed the song in a 1958 episode of The Adventures of Ozzie and Harriet entitled "Stealing Rick's Girl" (S07•E05).
- Andy Griffith sings this song in season 3 episode 10 "Opie's Rival" of The Andy Griffith Show (1962).
- On the Lawrence Welk Show episode "My Blue Heaven" (1964), Dick Dale and the Lennon Sisters perform this song.
- Mountain dancer D. Ray White made his first major appearance on a PBS special titled Talking Feet: Solo Southern Dance - Flatfoot, Buck and Tap wherein he performed to the accompaniment of a banjo rendition of the song by Paul Ray "Dunk" Farris.
