= Curb Your Tongue, Knave! =

Live album by Smothers Brothers
- Released: November 1, 1963
- Recorded: 1963 at Mister Kelly's, Chicago
- Genre: Comedy, folk
- Label: Mercury
- Producer: David Carroll

Smothers Brothers chronology
Think Ethnic! (1963)	Curb Your Tongue, Knave! (1963)	It Must Have Been Something I Said! (1964)

Professional ratings
Review scores
Source	Rating
Allmusic	4.5/5 stars
Record Mirror	3/5 stars

"Curb Your Tongue, Knave!" is the fourth comedy album recorded by the Smothers Brothers, released November 1, 1963, on Mercury Records. The album was recorded live at Mister Kelly's in Chicago. It reached number 13 on the Billboard Pop Albums chart. Curb Your Tongue, Knave! was the first of their original albums to be reissued on CD.

== Track listing ==
1. "Church Bells" (4:25) – Song about the bells of a Catholic church, a Protestant church, and a synagogue during which Dick mistakenly says "Catholic Chowers" instead of "Catholic Towers". The song is a "shaggy dog story", a drawn out explanation ending with the church bells finally playing in sequence, the effect being to ring out "Shave and a Haircut". – 4:22
2. "American History-1A" (5:09) – Tom tells what he knows about Davy Crockett, Jim Bowie, John Henry, and the ballad of Big Ben Covington, a friend of Johnny Appleseed, the main topic of the dissertation. "American History-IIA" and "IIB" are found on Tour de Farce: American History and Other Unrelated Subjects. – 5:07
3. "Lonesome Traveler" (4:16) – Tom thinks he is the classic radio detective "The Whistler", for he walks by night and he knows many things. Some of Tom's best guitar work is featured on this classic folk song. – 4:14
4. "Gnus" (2:29) – Tom has thought about being a big game hunter and hunting the vicious gnus. – 2:29
5. "The Incredible Jazz Banjoist" (4:24) – Tom attempts to play "Nola" and "Whispering" on the banjo. – 4:23
6. "I Talk to the Trees" (3:40) – Dick is singing the show tune from Paint Your Wagon but has to stop to explain to Tom what the song was about. Tom thinks the guy in the song sounds like a nut. – 3:40
7. "Flamenco" (2:51) – Tom attempts a flamenco guitar number from his "Spanish homeland". – 2:50
8. "Swiss Christmas" (4:35) – Actually the Israeli song "Tzena, Tzena, Tzena", which was previously the story of a one-humped camel race on The Smothers Brothers at the Purple Onion. – 4:34

== Personnel ==
- Dick Smothers – vocals, double bass
- Tom Smothers – vocals, guitar
- Carole Allen – Tape Editor
- Brent Averill – Engineer
- Elvin Campbell – Tape Editor
- David Carroll – Producer
- Bernie Clapper – Engineer
- Doug Hawkins – Mastering

== Chart positions ==
Year	Chart	Position
1964	Billboard Pop Albums	13
