= Ruby Jane Smith =

American musician (born 1994)

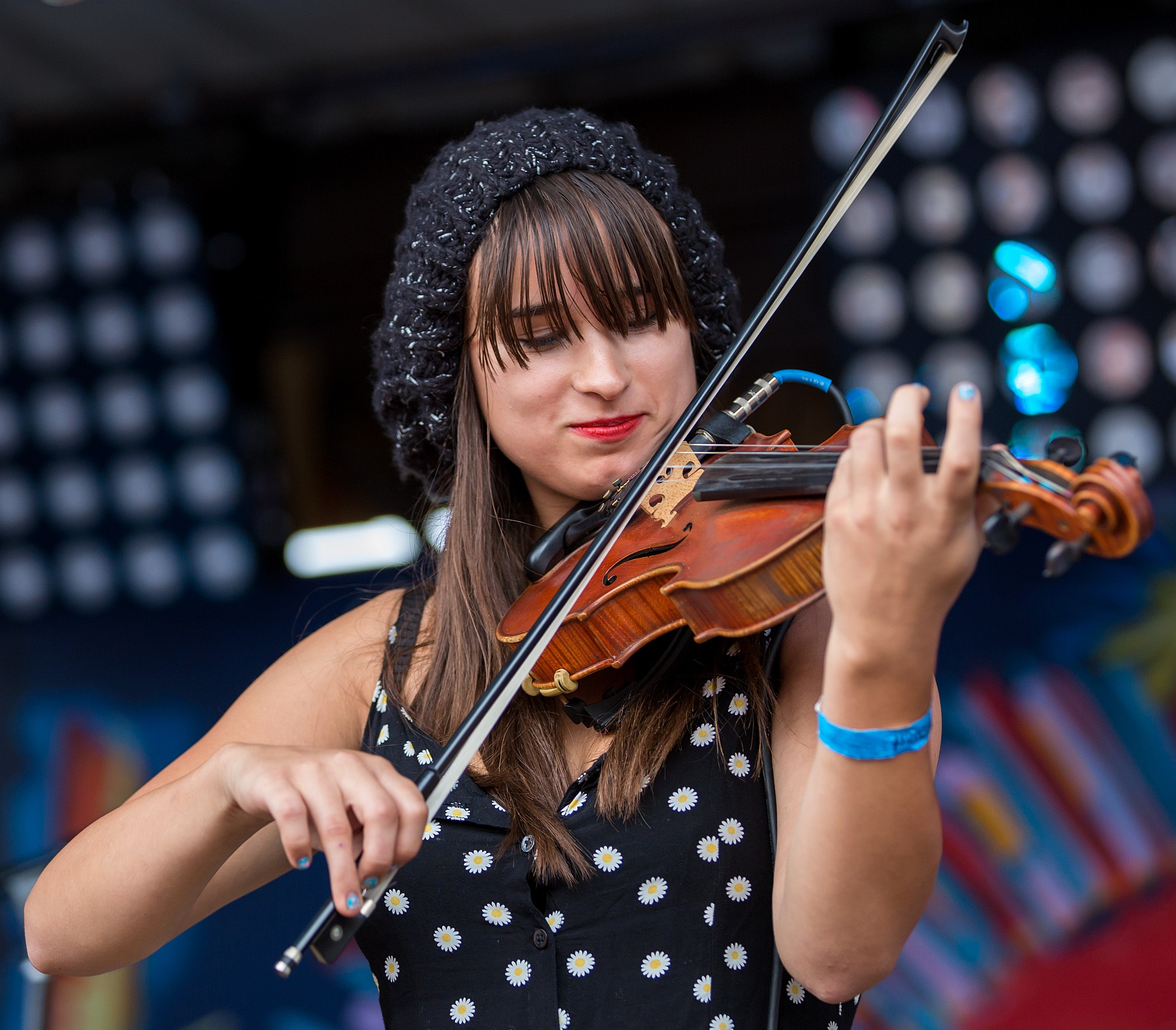
- Smith performing at Utopia Fest in 2014

Background information
- Born: Ruby Jane Smith; November 17, 1994 (age 31); Dallas, Texas, U.S.
- Origin: Columbus, Mississippi, U.S.
- Genres: Bluegrass, Americana music
- Instruments: Fiddle, vocals, Guitar, Mandolin, Harmonica
- Years active: 2005 – Present
- Label: Indie
- Website: www.rubyjane.org

Ruby Jane Smith (born November 17, 1994) is an American fiddle player, singer, and songwriter in the traditional bluegrass and Americana music genres. The youngest fiddler invited to play the Grand Ole Opry, Smith has toured and recorded with Asleep at the Wheel’s Ray Benson, Drake Bell, and Willie Nelson, and has performed on Austin City Limits.

Smith was born in Dallas, Texas, to parents who are originally from Columbus, Mississippi and while still a toddler moved there, with her mother, from whom she inherited a love for bluegrass music. Grand Ole Opry notable Jim Brock began instructing the seven-year-old Smith after seeing her perform onstage with Rhonda Vincent (Smith impressed Vincent and Brock with a rendering of "Boil Them Cabbage Down") and at age 10 she became the youngest invited fiddler to play at the Opry. She also performed in 2003 at the CMA Music Festival. After winning the 2005 Mississippi State Fiddle Championship and garnering several other contest titles, in 2008 Smith and her family moved to Austin, Texas.

Since moving to Austin, she has been mentored by Ray Benson, and she has toured with other artists (including Willie Nelson) She has performed in a Ray Benson play A Ride with Bob, and played on Willie Nelson’s Grammy-nominated Willie and the Wheel. She has recorded four CDs; her debut album Road to Columbus was released in 2006, and the follow-up 6-song EP Creekside was released in 2007. She realized a live CD "Live at Roadhouse Rags" in 2009 and her most recent EP Feels Like Home was released in 2010. She won the Daniel Pearl Memorial Violin award in 2007, named for Daniel Pearl and given by the foundation named for him, which promotes "Harmony for Humanity."

She was also an official performer at the 2010 and 2011 Austin City Limits Music Festival.

== Discography ==
- Road to Columbus (2006)
- Creekside (EP, 2007)
- Live At Roadhouse Rags (2009)
- Feels Like Home (EP, 2010)
- Celebrity (empire of emptiness) (2012)
