= Anne Virginia Culbertson =

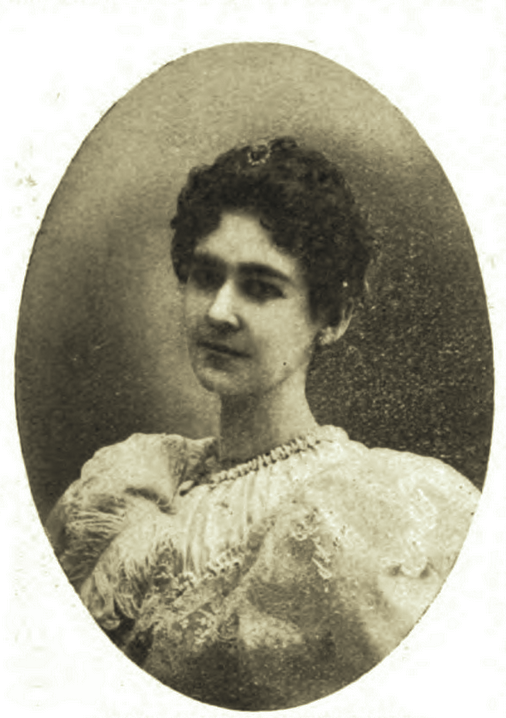
- Born: November 16, 1857 Zanesville, Ohio, U.S.
- Died: December 7, 1918 (aged 61) Delaware, Ohio, U.S.
- Occupation: writer; poet; elocutionist
- Genre: dialect poetry; short stories; articles
- Notable works: Cindy (folk song)

Anne Virginia Culbertson (November 16, 1857 – December 7, 1918) was an American writer, known chiefly as the author of dialect poems, and as a public reader of her own productions. Culbertson attempted numerous dialects; however, her work was not confined to dialect alone; she also wrote a good deal of serious verse. Others writings included occasional short stories and articles to various publications including the Cosmopolitan, Munsey's, Pearson's, the Puritan, Outing, Dixie, the Ladies' Home Journal, and prominent newspapers, such as the Boston Transcript, The Washington Post, and The Baltimore Sun.

== Early life and education ==
Anne Virginia Culbertson was born in Zanesville, Ohio, November 16, 1857. She came from a family prominently identified with Ohio. Her grandfather, the Rev. James Culbertson, came from Pennsylvania to Zanesville in the early part of the nineteenth century and for 30 years was recognized as an eminent and scholarly divine in this section. He was popularly known all over the state as "Parson Culbertson". Her father, Capt. Howard Culbertson, M.D. (1828–1890), was a surgeon who served through the Revolutionary War and afterward in the regular army. On his retirement, he became a noted specialist in diseases of the eye and at one time occupied the chair of ophthalmology in Columbus Medical College. Her father being a military man, Anne's childhood was spent in going from one military post to another. Her mother, Louisa Maria (Safford) (1836–1885), was a Southener, hence Anne's interest in Southern dialects. Anne had several siblings including Herbert, Ernest, Sydney, Lewis, Cornelia, and Claude.

Culbertson was educated in the common schools and Putnam Female Seminary, Zanesville, Ohio. Later, she studied in Washington.

== Career ==
Since completing her education, Culbertson passed much of her time in eastern cities and in the "back districts" of North Carolina, Virginia, and other states, where she studied the lives and folklore of the African Americans, poor whites, and Native Americans at first hand. She spent a summer in the Great Smoky Mountains of North Carolina in order to study the folklore of the Native Americans in that specific locale.

Since 1893, Culbertson was engaged as a writer and author-reader, giving entertainments in which she read her own writings and poems and dialect songs. She contributed to magazines and papers in verse and dialect stories chiefly in the negro dialect and dialect of mountain people of the South and French patois.

Culbertson was the author of Lays of a Wandering Minstrel (1896), At the Big House (1904), and Banjo Talks (Indianapolis, Indiana, Bobbs, Merrill Co., 1905), the latter being a popular book of dialect verse.

Some of her best poems were unpublished and were written during World War I. She belonged to The Vigilantes, a national society of poets and writers, formed during the World War to write patriotic articles and poems to stimulate patriotism. A number of these patriotic poems were published in newspapers and magazines and reprints sent to the sick and wounded soldiers in the U.S. and Europe.

She was honored by being invited to make a contribution to the Bibliothèque nationale de France in Paris, the invitation being extended through M. Rene Larvelle, a member of the Société des gens de lettres of France and a collector of note.

She also enjoyed a wide reputation as an impersonator and was very successful as an elocutionist in parlor lectures.

== Personal life ==
She numbered among her friends such great writers as Joel Chandler Harris, Ella Wheeler Wilcox, and James Whitcomb Riley.

Anne Virginia Culbertson died in Delaware, Ohio, December 7, 1918.

== Selected works ==
=== Books ===
- Lays of a Wandering Minstrel (1896) (Text)
- At the big house : where Aunt Nancy and Aunt 'Phrony held forth on the animal folks (1904) (Text)
- Banjo Talks (1905) (Text)
- Down in old Virginia (1914)

=== Short stories ===
- "How Mr. Terrapin Lost His Beard" (1924)
- "The Woman Who Married an Owl"
- "Mr. Hare Tries to Get a Wife"

=== Poems ===
- "Whar Dem Sinful Apples Grow"
- "Quit Yo' Worryin'"
- "When We Hear the Organ Down the Street"

== See also ==
- Cindy (folk song)
