= Dan Dion =

American photographer and comedy producer

Daniel James Dion (born December 11, 1970) is an American photographer and comedy producer. He is best known for his location portraiture of comedians, and was the house photographer of the legendary San Francisco venue The Fillmore for twenty years.

== Early life ==
Dion grew up in Kenwood, California. He attended Santa Clara University, where he was the campus comedy director, producing shows such as The Second City, P. J. O'Rourke, and Greg Proops. Upon graduation, he moved to San Francisco to work for political satirist Will Durst at his comedy club, the Holy City Zoo.

== Career ==
In 1993 he was an assistant photographer for the San Francisco Giants, and became the house photographer for The Fillmore and The Warfield venues as a staff shooter for Bill Graham Presents. His location portraits of comedians have spawned ongoing exhibitions at Gotham Comedy Club, The Punch Line San Francisco, the Upright Citizens Brigade Theater in Hollywood, as well as an annual show at the Montreal Just For Laughs Festival. In 2004, as a producer, he brought comedy back to The Purple Onion and later produced a stand-up comedy web series there for Crackle, a division of Sony Entertainment. In 2012 he produced the final show at the Purple Onion, when the entire building was sold to a restaurant concern. From there he became a comedy producer for Audible.com, bringing such talents as Lewis Black, Jonathan Katz, and Maria Bamford to the platform and producing live shows for the SF SketchFest. In 2019 he moved to Nashville, TN to become Head of A&R at 800 Pound Gorilla Records, the country's biggest comedy record label. In 2022 he opened an art gallery and photo studio next door to Third Man Records in Nashville. In 2024 he left 800 Pound Gorilla and founded comedy record label Goat Song Records, which currently has a roster that includes Patton Oswalt, Margaret Cho, Jim Jefferies, Drew Lynch, Jena Friedman, Arj Barker, Michelle Wolf, Emo Philips, Sammy Obeid, D.L.Hughley, and the late Jim Short.

== Author ==
In May 2010, Dion's book ¡SATIRISTAS!, co-authored with Paul Provenza, was published by Harper-Collins. It features interviews and portraits with Stephen Colbert, Bill Maher, George Carlin, and other satirists.

He was the photographer for the book Tuesday Tucks Me In, written by Luis Carlos Montalván and Bret Witter and published by Roaring Brook Press. It was voted by the editors at Amazon as the "Best Children's Nonfiction Book of 2016". He and Montalván published a sequel, "Tuesday Takes Me There" in 2018.
