= The Vigilantes =

Twentieth-century American publishing syndicate

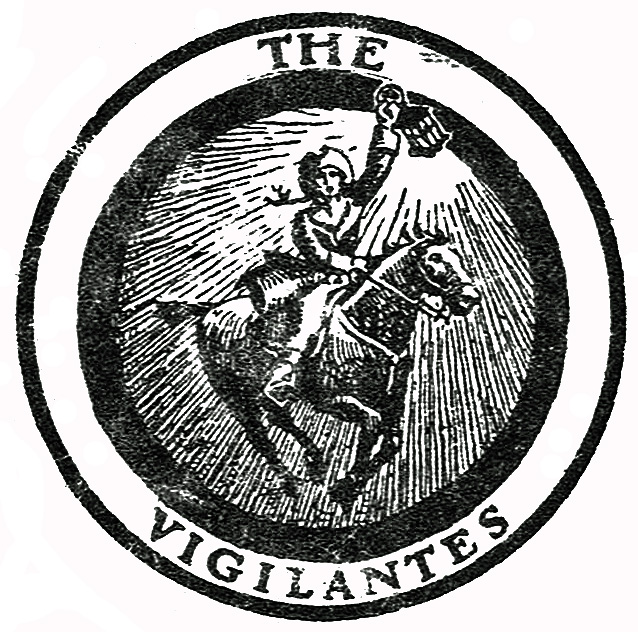
Publisher's design in Fifes and Drums Vigilantes, 1917

The Vigilantes was a twentieth-century American publishing syndicate. Their pamphlets and newspapers were distributed with the intention of inspiring patriotism and Allied involvement in World War I. The membership was largely composed of men, who dominated its leadership, though much of the content was produced by women and appeared pseudonymously as the work of "the Vigilantes". A contemporary review noted the "breathless cries of song wrung mostly from the hearts of our women."

The preface to a poetry anthology, published as Vigilantes Books: Fifes And Drums: A Collection of Poems of America at War, gave the following remarks on the authors' works:

These poems, written under the immediate stress of great events by those who have banded themselves together under the name of The Vigilantes, furnish a striking record of the emotional reactions of the American people during the fortnight preceding and the six weeks following the declaration of war....

== Notable people ==
- Anne Virginia Culbertson (1864-1918), author, poet
- George Sterling (1869-1926), poet
