= The Two Sides of the Smothers Brothers =

Studio album (with live tracks) by Smothers Brothers
- Released: September 1, 1962
- Venue: The Crystal Palace in St. Louis
- Studio: Bell Sound (New York City)
- Genres: Comedy, folk
- Label: Mercury

Smothers Brothers chronology
The Smothers Brothers at the Purple Onion (1961)	The Two Sides of the Smothers Brothers (1962)	Think Ethnic! (1963)

The Two Sides of the Smothers Brothers (released September 1, 1962 on Mercury Records) is the second comedy album by the Smothers Brothers. Side 1 (tracks 1–6) consisted of comedy and was recorded at The Crystal Palace in St. Louis during a live performance. Side 2 (tracks 7–12) was recorded at the Bell Sound Studios in New York City with a full orchestra and represented the singing side of the boys. The Two Sides of the Smothers Brothers reached number 26 on the Billboard Pop Albums chart.

The liner notes to the compilation album Sibling Revelry: The Best of the Smothers Brothers, state that The Two Sides of the Smothers Brothers was the biggest selling album of their career, spending sixty-six weeks on the Billboard album chart, and peaking at #26.

According to the Smothers Brothers biography Dangerously Funny, half of the album was dedicated to straight music because the duo had not yet developed enough new comedy material to fill the second side of the record. The brothers performed their original act in its entirety on their first album, The Smothers Brothers at the Purple Onion.

== Track listing ==
1. "Chocolate" (2:35) – Tom sings of how he fell into a 30-foot vat of chocolate.
2. "Hangman" (0:55) – "Hangman, hangman, slack your rope..."
3. "I Don't Care" (0:35) – Tom's version of "Jimmy Crack Corn"
4. "Laredo" (2:56) – Also known as "The Cowboy's Lament"
5. "Cabbage" (6:37) – The boys' version of the American folk song includes Tom's history lesson on railroads, pumas and 'cravices' .
6. "Map of the World (Let the Rest of the World Go By)" (2:05) – The story of a young lady who showed up to a costume party tattooed as a map of the world.
7. "Stella's Got a New Dress" (2:11)
8. "Where the Lilac Grows" (2:55) – "Greensleeves" with contemporary lyrics.
9. "If It Fits Your Fancy" (2:53)
10. "The Four Winds and the Seven Seas" (3:37)
11. "Sailor's Lament" (2:05)
12. "Apples, Peaches and Cherries" (3:01)

== Personnel ==
- Dick Smothers – vocals, double bass
- Tom Smothers – vocals, guitar

== Chart positions ==
Year	Chart	Position
1962	Billboard Pop Albums	26
