= The Purple Onion =

Cellar club in San Francisco, California, US

Coordinates: 37°47′48″N 122°24′17″W

The Purple Onion was a celebrated cellar club in the North Beach area of San Francisco, California, located at 140 Columbus Avenue (between Jackson and Pacific). With an intimate, 80-person setting, the club was a popular influence in local music and entertainment during the Beat era of the 1950s and 1960s.

== History ==
The Purple Onion originally opened in 1952 (74 years ago) under the management of Keith Rockwell. His sister and brother-in-law, Virginia "Ginnie" and Irving "Bud" Steinhoff would frequently work weekends at the club until 1960 when they took over management. Bud Steinhoff managed the Purple Onion until his death in November 1983. Virginia Steinhoff continued to operate the club until 1989.

=== First-wave comedy and performance ===
Notable entertainers who either got their starts or played the California club in the 1950s and 1960s include Bob Newhart, Lenny Bruce, Woody Allen, Alameda housewife Phyllis Diller (making her stand-up debut in 1955), Richard Pryor, Maya Angelou, The Kingston Trio, Jim Nabors, The Irish Rovers, and the Smothers Brothers—whose first album was titled The Smothers Brothers at the Purple Onion, but in reality, only the introduction was actually recorded there.

=== Music venue ===
Tom Guido became the club's manager in 1993. Under him it became the center of San Francisco's garage rock scene, featuring such bands as The Rip Offs, Spoiled Brats, The Trashwomen, The Makers, Tee and Thee Crumpets, The Phantom Surfers, The 5.6.7.8's, Brian Jonestown Massacre, The Groovie Ghoulies, The Go-Nuts, Guitar Wolf and many others. The club closed in 1999. Tom Guido died in 2019.

=== Return to comedy ===
In 2004, the club reopened and returned to comedy. Photographer and booker Dan Dion started a weekly comedy night that featured comedians such as Robin Williams, Paul Krassner, Jim Short, and Tom Rhodes. David Owen presented the debut of Mort Sahl in June 2005, and shows by Greg Proops, Zach Galifianakis, Margaret Cho, Todd Barry, Dan Piraro, and Judah Friedlander. Throughout this period it was also a regular haunt for satirist Will Franken By 2010, the club was only running weekend shows, though these shows were usually over capacity at 100–110 people.

== Closure and reopening ==
In September 2012 (14 years ago), the building was sold with "no plans to rescue".

The club reopened in August 2014 as Doc's Lab and hosted both music and comedy throughout the week, until its closure in February 2018.

The Purple Onion name was used from 2012–2018 around the corner with "The Purple Onion at Kell's" at 530 Jackson Street, a showcase of underground and Bay Area comedy acts on Wednesday and Thursday nights.

The club reopened in November 2022 as Lyon & Swan, "a high-end restaurant with nightly live entertainment.". Lyon & Swan closed after only 11 months in 2023. "

== See also ==
- Hungry I
- Old Spaghetti Factory Cafe
