= Waist Deep in the Big Muddy =

1967 single by Pete Seeger

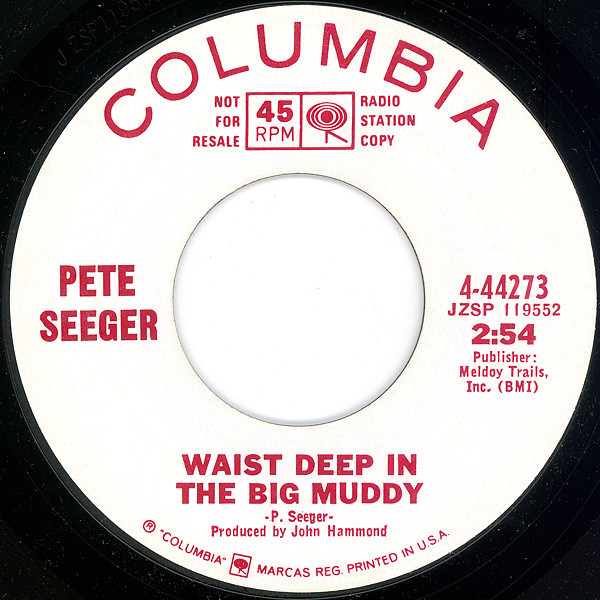
- U.S. single (1967)

Single by Pete Seeger

from the album Waist Deep in the Big Muddy and Other Love Songs
- A-side: "Down by the Riverside"
- Released: 1967
- Genre: Folk
- Length: 2:54
- Label: Columbia
- Songwriter: Pete Seeger
- Producer: John Hammond

Pete Seeger singles chronology
| "Draft Dodger Rag" (1965) | "Waist Deep in the Big Muddy" (1967) | "I Feel like I'm Fixin' to Die Rag" (1970) |

"Waist Deep in the Big Muddy" is a song written by Pete Seeger in 1967 and made famous because of its censorship from The Smothers Brothers Comedy Hour.

== Story ==
The song tells the story of a platoon wading in a river in Louisiana on a practice patrol in 1942. Imperiously ignoring his sergeant's concerns, the captain orders the platoon to continue with himself in the lead until they are finally up to their necks. Suddenly, the captain drowns and the sergeant instantly orders the unit to turn back to the original shore. It turns out the captain was not aware that the river was deeper with a joining stream upriver. The narrator declines to state an obvious moral but intimates from what he has read in the paper that his nation itself is being led into similar peril by authoritarian fools. Each verse ends with a line noting that "the big fool said to push on" except for the final verse, which changes to the present tense, and the fourth verse which says "the captain dead and gone." The story is similar to the Ribbon Creek incident, which occurred in 1956.

== Significance ==
The song was considered symbolic of the Vietnam War and President Lyndon B. Johnson's policy of escalation, then widely seen as pushing the United States deeper into the increasingly unpopular war. Like the Captain's demise, Johnson was eventually forced to abandon plans for re-election due to the war in 1968. The captain's criticism of a dissenting sergeant as a "Nervous Nelly" in the song's third verse appears to mimic Johnson's epithet for critics of the war.

Seeger often performed the song at concerts and rallies, and in late 1967 he was invited to perform on the Smothers Brothers Comedy Hour. Seeger chose to perform "Big Muddy," and sang the song on the taping of the CBS show in September 1967 but CBS management objected to its political tone, and censored the song prior to broadcast. Following the strong support from the Smothers Brothers, the show's hosts, CBS later relented and allowed Seeger to come back and sing the song on the Brothers' February 25, 1968 show. At the time, Seeger was under contract to Columbia Records, which was owned by CBS, and he had just recorded the song in an album titled Waist Deep in the Big Muddy and Other Love Songs. The broadcast is included on the DVD The Best of the Smothers Brothers.

== Cover versions ==
Richard Shindell recorded a cover of this song on his 2005 album Vuelta.

The song was covered by Dick Gaughan in his 1997 album Sail On.

John McCutcheon covered the song on his 2007 album This Fire.

Ani DiFranco contributed her cover to Appleseed Recording's Sowing the Seeds: The 10th Anniversary collection in 2007.

Bruce Springsteen, who would later record an album of Seeger-related songs, used the line "Waist deep in the big muddy" as the chorus for his 1992 song, "Big Muddy."

The song was translated into French by Graeme Allwright in 1971 under the title "Jusqu'à la ceinture".

The song was translated into Russian by Alexander Dolsky who performed the song in concerts in the 1980s during the Soviet–Afghan War, which has been referred to as the "Soviet Union's Vietnam." The song was released on a 1988 LP "Landscape in a frame", later reissued on CD.

John Fogerty's song "Deja Vu (All Over Again)" makes reference to the "Big Muddy".

The song was translated into Japanese in 2015 under the title "Koshi made Doro mamire".

Kronos Quartet's 2020 album Long Time Passing, celebrating the music of Pete Seeger, includes their recording of the song with Brian Carpenter.

== See also ==
- List of anti-war songs
