= The Smothers Brothers Show =

American television series

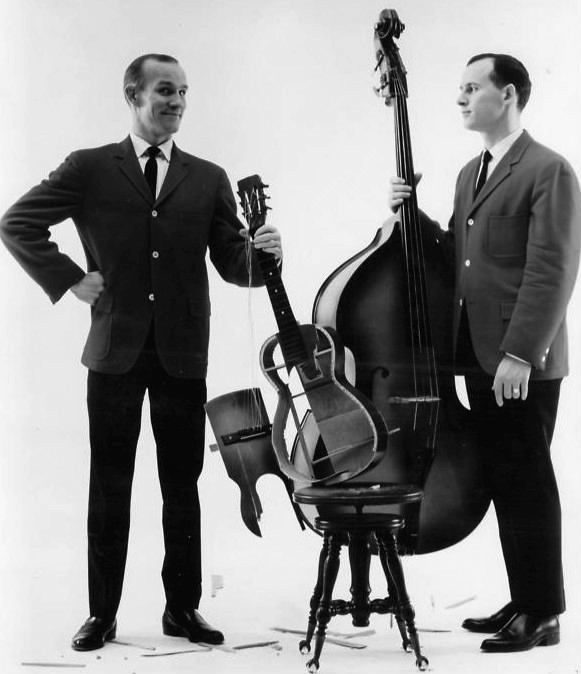
- Tom and Dick Smothers, 1965
- Genre: Fantasy sitcom
- Created by: Aaron Spelling; Richard Newton
- Written by: Dee Caruso; Gerald Gardner; Lila Garrett; Alex Gottlieb; Bernie Kahn; Arnold Margolin; Jim Parker; Arthur Weingarten; Allan Burns (uncredited); Chris Hayward (uncredited)
- Directed by: Charles Barton; Frederick De Cordova; Sidney Miller; H. Bruce Humberstone
- Starring: Smothers Brothers
- Theme music composer: Perry Botkin Jr.
- Composer: Perry Botkin Jr.
- Country of origin: United States
- Original language: English
- No. of seasons: 1
- No. of episodes: 32

Production
- Executive producer: Aaron Spelling
- Producers: Frederick De Cordova; Phil Sharp (uncredited)
- Running time: 22–24 minutes
- Production company: Four Star-Knave

Original release
- Network: CBS
- Release: September 17, 1965 – April 22, 1966

The Smothers Brothers Show (also known as My Brother the Angel) is an American fantasy sitcom featuring the Smothers Brothers that aired on CBS on Friday nights at 9:30 p.m. ET from September 17, 1965, to April 22, 1966, co-sponsored by Alberto-Culver's VO5 hairdressing products and American Tobacco's Tareyton cigarettes. It was the first television show to feature the Smothers Brothers as regulars, following a series of night club and guest appearances. It lasted one season, consisting of 32 episodes.

It was the network's last sitcom filmed in black-and-white; shortly after its final telecast, all CBS prime-time series were transmitted in color. In 1986, two decades after cancellation, reruns were seen on Nick at Nite.

== Synopsis ==
Dick Smothers played himself as a rising young executive at Pandora Publications, working for publisher Leonard J. Costello (Roland Winters). Brother Tom had been lost at sea two years earlier and now shows up as an apprentice angel assigned to do good deeds on Earth to earn his wings and become a full-fledged angel. Of course, Tom's efforts to help people never seem to work as planned and Dick had to help him clean up the mess. Tom received his orders from Ralph, his unseen and unheard boss. The series also featured Harriet MacGibbon as Mrs. Harriet Costello, and on occasion, Ann Elder as Dick's co-worker and girlfriend, Janet. Eileen O'Neill also appeared in several episodes as another of Dick's girlfriends, Wanda. As was typical of the Smothers Brothers in The Smothers Brothers Comedy Hour, Dick was typically the straight man to Tom's humorous antics.

=== Creative control struggles ===
The series was produced by Four Star Television in association with the brothers' Knave Productions (named for Tom's catchphrase "Curb Your Tongue, Knave!" and the title of their 1963 record album).

This series may have inspired the Brothers' more successful later series The Smothers Brothers Comedy Hour in that Tom Smothers had been critical of the series as not being compatible with the brothers' strengths, and both brothers were reportedly uncomfortable performing in a scripted format (in fact, he fought with Four Star executives over more creative control of the series, earning an ulcer and irritating his marital relationship to the point of divorce at the end of the season).

For instance, neither brother played their instruments on the show (with one exception, at the beginning of "'Twas The Week Before Christmas" episode), and it was not until halfway through the season that they sang the theme song.

== Episodes ==
No.	Title	Directed by	Written by	Original release date
1	"There's Something About a Sailor"	Fred de Cordova	Alex Gottlieb	September 17, 1965
Dick's life is turned upside down when his dead brother Tommy returns to Earth as an apprentice angel. An uncredited Gary Owens narrates the opening.
2	"Take a Tramp to Lunch This Week"	Fred de Cordova	Arnold Margolin & Jim Parker	September 24, 1965
Tommy searches for a writer.
3	"A Boarding House Is Not a Home"	Charles T. Barton	Lila Garrett & Bernie Kahn	October 1, 1965
Tommy tries to save a local boardinghouse. With Madge Blake and Charles Lane.
4	"Is Your Wig Wam?"	Charles T. Barton	Arthur Weingarten	October 8, 1965
Tommy's assigned to help a native tribe get permission to build a hospital.
5	"Pay the Man the $27.95"	Fred de Cordova	Alex Gottlieb	October 15, 1965
Tommy gets a job selling magazine subscriptions.
6	"Tear Out the Presses, Stop the Front Page"	Sidney Miller	Gerald Gardner & Dee Caruso	October 22, 1965
Tommy tries to convince Dick's boss to invest in a failing newspaper.
7	"You're Only Old Once"	Sidney Miller	Jack Raymond	October 29, 1965
Tommy is aged 70 years in order to help the residents of a nursing home.
8	"I Wouldn't Miss My Own Funeral for Anything"	Charles T. Barton	Unknown	November 5, 1965
Dick is presented with the death benefit from Tommy's policy -- $800.
9	"Halo in the Ring"	Fred de Cordova	Gerald Gardner & Dee Caruso	November 12, 1965
Tommy must track down a missing prizefighter.
10	"It Don't Mean a Dang if It Ain't Got That Twang"	H. Bruce Humberstone	Arnold Margolin & Jim Parker	November 19, 1965
Tommy tries to help a struggling songwriter.
11	"Boys Will Be Playboys"	H. Bruce Humberstone	Ralph Goodman & Ray Allen	November 26, 1965
In order to protect a Texas millionaire, Tommy assumes the identity of a wealthy playboy. With Wayne Rogers.
12	"Immaterial Witness"	Fred de Cordova	Gene Thompson	December 3, 1965
Tommy latest assignment is to help a reformed gangster.
13	"Here Comes the Bridegroom"	Sidney Miller	Joseph Hoffman	December 10, 1965
Tommy tries his hand at matchmaking. With Betty Lynn.
14	"'Twas the Week Before Christmas"	Sidney Miller	Story by : David Zeitlin; Teleplay by : Alex Gottlieb	December 17, 1965
Dick and Tommy struggle to get toys for needy children at Christmas. Featuring a small role for a very young Eve Plumb.
15	"Happiness Is a Guy Named Happy"	Unknown	Unknown	December 24, 1965
16	"The Rise and Fall of the Wedding Cake"	Unknown	Unknown	December 31, 1965
17	"Outside Inside Hollywood"	Charles T. Barton	Gerald Gardner & Dee Caruso	January 7, 1966
Tommy is assigned to save Dick from unemployment, as his job will be taken over by a machine. With Alan Reed.
18	"The Hawaiian Caper"	Charles T. Barton	Alex Gottlieb	January 14, 1966
When Mr. Costello vacations in Hawaii, he has to summon Dick when he gets himself into trouble -- and Tommy comes along to help. With Keye Luke.
19	"Never Trust a Naked Rembrandt"	Fred de Cordova	Art Weingarten	January 21, 1966
Tommy tries to reform a burglar, who still wants to pull off one last heist.
20	"Harried, Italian Style"	Norman Foster	Jim Parker & Arnold Margolin	January 28, 1966
Dick's job involves him keeping watch over an impetuous and high-strung Italian movie actress; Tommy's help just makes things more chaotic.
21	"The Big Newsboy War"	Norman Foster	Jack Raymond	February 4, 1966
In an effort to move beyond probationary angel status, Tommy poses as a newsboy so he can find deserving people to help.
22	"We'd Rather Switch Than Fight"	Unknown	Unknown	February 11, 1966
23	"The Ghost Is Clear"	Unknown	Unknown	February 18, 1966
24	"Heaven Help the Dropout"	Unknown	Unknown	February 25, 1966
25	"His Honor, the Crook"	Unknown	Unknown	March 4, 1966
26	"Her Number Is 36-22-35"	Unknown	Unknown	March 11, 1966
27	"The Girl from R.A.L.P.H."	Unknown	Unknown	March 18, 1966
28	"The Boss Who Came to Breakfast, Lunch and Dinner"	Unknown	Unknown	March 25, 1966
29	"How to Succeed in Business and Be Really Trying"	Unknown	Unknown	April 1, 1966
30	"I'm in Love with a Mortal"	Unknown	Unknown	April 8, 1966
31	"A Wolf in Sheik's Clothing"	Unknown	Unknown	April 15, 1966
32	"Wash You Were Here"	Unknown	Unknown	April 22, 1966
