= Michael, Row the Boat Ashore =

Folk song based on a Sea Islands spiritual

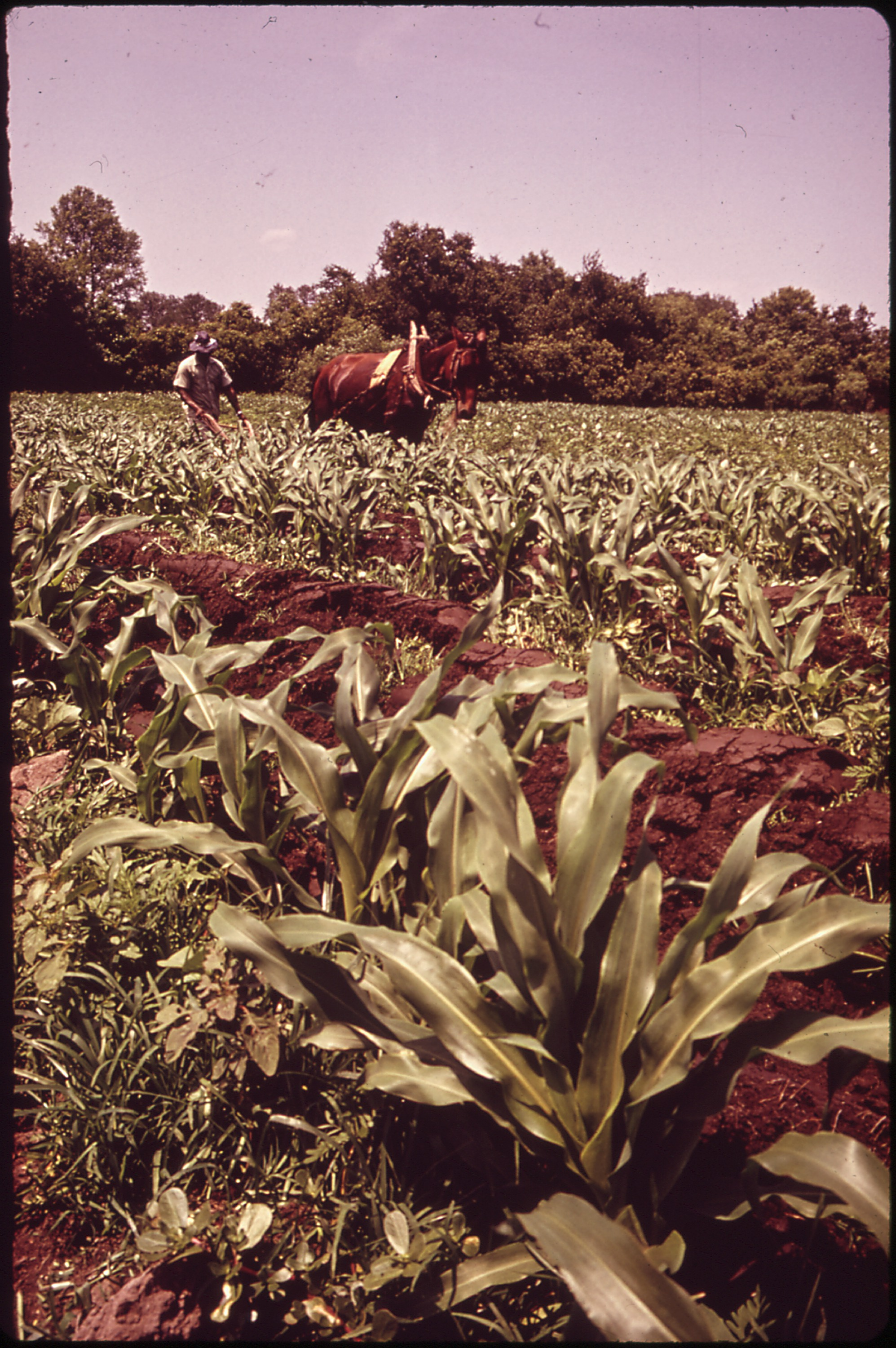
A man works a cornfield on St. Helena Island, where "Michael Row the Boat Ashore" was first attested.

"Michael, Row the Boat Ashore" (also called "Michael Rowed the Boat Ashore", "Michael, Row Your Boat Ashore", or "Michael, Row That Gospel Boat") is a traditional spiritual first noted during the American Civil War at St. Helena Island, one of the Sea Islands of South Carolina. The best-known recording was released in 1960 by the U.S. folk band The Highwaymen; that version briefly reached number-one hit status as a single in the United States in September 1961.

== History ==
The song was sung by former slaves whose owners had abandoned the island before the Union navy arrived to enforce a blockade. Charles Pickard Ware was an abolitionist and Harvard graduate who had come to supervise the plantations on St. Helena Island from 1862 to 1865, and he wrote down the song in music notation as he heard the freedmen sing it. Ware's cousin William Francis Allen reported in 1863 that the formerly enslaved Black Americans sang the song as they rowed him in a boat across Station Creek.

The song was first published in 1867 in Slave Songs of the United States by Allen, Ware, and Lucy McKim Garrison. Folk musician and educator Tony Saletan rediscovered it in 1954 in a library copy of that book and introduced it into the American folk music revival. The song is cataloged as Roud Folk Song Index No. 11975.

== Lyrics ==
One of the oldest published versions of the song runs in a series of unrhymed couplets:

Michael row de boat ashore, Hallelujah!
Michael boat a gospel boat, Hallelujah!
I wonder where my mudder deh. [there]
See my mudder on de rock gwine home.
On de rock gwine home in Jesus' name.
Michael boat a music boat.
Gabriel blow de trumpet horn.
O you mind your boastin' talk.
Boastin' talk will sink your soul.
Brudder, lend a helpin' hand.
Sister, help for trim dat boat.
Jordan stream is wide and deep.
Jesus stand on t' oder side.
I wonder if my maussa deh.
My fader gone to unknown land.
O de Lord he plant his garden deh.
He raise de fruit for you to eat.
He dat eat shall neber die.
When de riber overflow.
O poor sinner, how you land?
Riber run and darkness comin'.
Sinner row to save your soul.

The same source attests another version in rhyme:

Michael haul the boat ashore.
Then you'll hear the horn they blow.
Then you'll hear the trumpet sound.
Trumpet sound the world around.
Trumpet sound for rich and poor.
Trumpet sound the jubilee.
Trumpet sound for you and me.

This song originated in oral tradition, and there are many versions of the lyrics. It begins with the refrain, "Michael, row the boat ashore, Hallelujah." The lyrics describe crossing the River Jordan, as in these lines from Pete Seeger's version:

Jordan's river is deep and wide, hallelujah.
Meet my mother on the other side, hallelujah.
Jordan's river is chilly and cold, hallelujah.
Chills the body, but not the soul, hallelujah.

Saletan's own version includes those lines, and these additional verses taken from the 1867 source:

Michael, hear the trumpet sound, hallelujah,
Trumpet sound the world around, hallelujah.
Trumpet sound the Jubilee, hallelujah,
Trumpet sound for you and me, hallelujah.

The River Jordan was where Jesus was baptized and can be viewed as a metaphor for deliverance and salvation, but also as the boundary of the Promised Land, death, and the transition to Heaven.

According to William Francis Allen, the song refers to the Archangel Michael. In the Catholic tradition, Michael is often regarded as a psychopomp or conductor of the souls of the dead.

The spiritual was also recorded on Johns Island during the 1960s by American folk musician and musicologist Guy Carawan and his wife, Candie Carawan. Janie Hunter, former singer of the Moving Star Hall singers, noted that her father, son of former slaves, would sing the spiritual when he rowed his boat back to the shore after catching fish.

Row, Michael, Row, Hallelujah,
Row, Michael, Row, Hallelujah,
Row the boat ashore, Hallelujah,
See how we (do) the row, Hallelujah,
See how we the row, Hallelujah,
Let me tries me chance, Hallelujah,
Let me tries me chance, Hallelujah,
Jump in the jolly boat, Hallelujah,
Jump in the jolly boat, Hallelujah,
Just row Michael, row, Hallelujah,
Row the boat ashore, Hallelujah.

(repeated thus until end)

A similar version was collected by Guy Carawan on an unspecified Sea Island.

Let me try my chance, Hallelujah,
Let me try my chance, Hallelujah,
Sister Mary try her chance, Hallelujah,
Sister Mary try her chance, Hallelujah,
Just let me try my chance, Hallelujah,
Just let me try my chance, Hallelujah,
Michael row your boat ashore, Hallelujah,
Michael row your boat ashore, Hallelujah,
Sister Mary row your boat, Hallelujah,
Sister Mary row your boat, Hallelujah,
Everybody try a chance, Hallelujah
Everybody try a chance, Hallelujah
Oh just let me try my chance, Hallelujah
Oh just let me try my chance, Hallelujah

(repeated thus until end)

Following the September 1961 murder of local NAACP charter member Herbert Lee in Amite County, Mississippi, – the same month that the Highwaymen's arrangement reached No. 1 on the hit parade – a version of "Michael" was among the songs that civil rights activists arrested for protesting the killing sang to keep their spirits up, led by Hollis Watkins, according to a note smuggled out of the county jail by COFO and SNCC leader Bob Moses:

Michael row the boat ashore, Alleluia
Christian brothers don't be slow, Alleluia
Mississippi's next to go, Alleluia.

Harry Belafonte sang a rather different rendition on his 1962 album Midnight Special which combines elements drawn from Christianity, American slavery, and Civil Rights Movement. The lyrics work their way through different parts of the Biblical narrative before concluding with the following verses:

They nailed Jesus to the Cross, Hallelujah
But his faith was never lost, Hallelujah
So Christian soldiers off to war, Hallelujah
Hold that line in Arkansas, Hallelujah
Michael row the boat ashore, Hallelujah!
Michael row the boat ashore, Hallelujah!

Like Joshua at Jericho, Hallelujah
Alabama's next to go, Hallelujah
So Mississippi kneel and pray, Hallelujah
Some more buses on the way, Hallelujah
Michael row the boat ashore, Hallelujah!
Michael row the boat ashore, Hallelujah!

== Recordings ==
"Michael"

Single by The Highwaymen

from the album The Highwaymen
- B-side: "Santiano"
- Released: September 1960
- Recorded: June 1960
- Studio: Bell Sound Studios, New York City
- Genre: Folk
- Length: 2:57
- Label: United Artists
- Songwriters: Tony Saletan, traditional
- Producer: Lou Adler

The Highwaymen singles chronology
"Michael" (1960)	"Cotton Fields" (1961)

The version of "Michael, Row the Boat Ashore" that became a folk standard was adapted in 1954 by Boston folksinger, songfinder and teacher Tony Saletan from the 1867 songbook Slave Songs of the United States. As Saletan later explained, "I judged that the tune was very singable, added some harmony (a guitar accompaniment) and thought the one-word chorus would be an easy hit with [younger singers]. But a typical original verse consisted of one line repeated once, and I thought a rhyme would be more interesting to the teenagers at Shaker Village Work Camp, where I introduced it. So I adapted traditional African-American couplets in place of the original verses." Saletan taught it to Pete Seeger later that year. Saletan himself never recorded the song, but he can be heard singing it during a 2017 podcast interview.

Seeger taught "Michael, Row" to the rest of the Weavers, who performed it at their Christmas Eve 1955 post-blacklist reunion concert. A recording of that performance was released in 1957 on an album titled The Weavers on Tour. In the same year, folksinger Bob Gibson included it on his Carnegie Concert album. Saletan shared a 1958 copyright in his adaptation with the members of the Weavers. The Weavers included an arrangement in The Weavers' Song Book, published in 1960. Similarly, Seeger included it in his 1961 songbook, American Favorite Ballads, with an attribution to Saletan. An older, traditional version, titled "Row Michael Row," was later collected in the Sea Islands by folklorist Guy Carawan.

The American folk quintet the Highwaymen had a #1 hit in 1961 on both the pop and easy listening charts in the U.S. with their version, under the simpler title of "Michael", recorded and released in 1960. The Highwaymen's arrangement reached #1 for three weeks on Top 40 radio station WABC in New York City in August 1961, and for two weeks in September 1961 on Billboard's Hot 100 nationally, remaining in the top ten into October. This recording also went to #1 in the United Kingdom. Billboard ranked the record as the No. 3 song of 1961.

The Highwaymen version that went to #1 on the Billboard charts had these lyrics:

Michael row the boat ashore, hallelujah.
Michael row the boat ashore, hallelujah.
Sister help to trim the sail, hallelujah.
Sister help to trim the sail, hallelujah.
Michael row the boat ashore, hallelujah.
Michael row the boat ashore, hallelujah.
The River Jordan is chilly and cold, hallelujah.
Chills the body but not the soul, hallelujah.
Michael row the boat ashore, hallelujah.
Michael row the boat ashore, hallelujah.
The river is deep and the river is wide, hallelujah.
Milk and honey on the other side, hallelujah.
Michael row the boat ashore, hallelujah.
Michael row the boat ashore, hallelujah.

The recording begins and ends with one of the singers whistling the tune a cappella, later accompanied by simple instruments, in a slow, ballad style. All the Highwaymen sang and harmonized on the Michael lines but individual singers soloed for each set of additional lyrics. This version differs from the Pete Seeger/Tony Saletan version by changing "meet my mother on the other side" to "milk and honey on the other side." "Milk and honey" is a phrase used in the Book of Exodus during Moses' vision of the burning bush, where the Promised Land is described as “…a land flowing with milk and honey…” (Exodus 3:8). The original Negro spiritual mentions the singer's mother but the hit version does not.

Lonnie Donegan reached #6 in the UK Singles Chart with his cover version in 1961. Harry Belafonte recorded a popular version of it for his 1962 Midnight Special album. Pete Seeger included it in his Children's Concert at Town Hall in 1963. Seeger also sang a solo version at a 1968 Town Hall children's concert, recorded live and released on Harmony Records (#H30399, track B3), a budget label of Columbia Records. Seeger likewise included "Michael" when he appeared as a guest on Sesame Street in 1970, during the iconic children's television show's second season, using it to teach Big Bird the idea of a participatory sing-along. The same lesson was included when Seeger recorded a Sesame Street album for Children's Television Workshop in 1974 with Brother Kirk.

Trini Lopez had a minor hit with it in 1964. The Israeli-French singer Rika Zaraï also recorded a French version under the title "Michaël" in 1964. The African-American gospel/folk duo Joe & Eddie recorded it for their "Walking Down the Line" album in 1965. The Lennon Sisters recorded a version which was later featured as a bonus track on a CD re-release of their album "The Lennon Sisters Sing Great Hits".

The Carawans' recording from St. Johns Island of "Jane Hunter and three Moving Star Hall singers" performing a traditional "Row, Michael, Row," was released by Smithsonian Folkways Records in 1967 on the album, Been in the Storm So Long.

In the January 12, 1968 TV episode of Tarzan ("The Convert"), the song is performed by a trio of nuns arriving at an African village by canoe. The nuns were played by guest stars Diana Ross and the Supremes.

The song was recorded by The Beach Boys for their 1976 15 Big Ones album but was left off the final running order. Brian Wilson rearranged the song, giving it a rich arrangement with sound similar to the many other covers recorded during this period, including a complex vocal arrangement. Mike Love sang lead vocals. Richard Jon Smith's version spent nine weeks in mid-1979 at #1 in South Africa.

Being a well-documented song and publicised by English Folk Dance and Song Society, The Broadside Ballads Project, and Mainly Norfolk, the song was recorded by Jon Boden and Oli Steadman for inclusion in their respective lists of daily folk songs "A Folk Song a Day" and "365 Days Of Folk".

The counselors sing the song, along with "Down in the Valley" in the opening scene of the 1980 horror film, Friday the 13th, and in the ending scene from the fifth episode of the related television series Crystal Lake.

A German version is "Michael, bring dein Boot an Land" by Ronny (de). A German gospel version is "Hört, wen Jesus glücklich preist" (A song of the Beatitudes). The German disco group Dschinghis Khan recorded a version of it in 1981.

The Smothers Brothers did a fairly straightforward version of the song on their album It Must Have Been Something I Said!, before turning it into a comic sing-along on Golden Hits of the Smothers Brothers, Vol. 2 (which is also included on their album Sibling Revelry: The Best of the Smothers Brothers).

Raffi sings this song on his 1994 Bananaphone album.

Peter, Paul and Mary included it on their 1998 Around the Campfire album.

Greg & Steve appropriated the tune and substituted original lyrics for their song, "A Man Named King," on their 1989 Holidays & Special Times album. The melody, as adapted by Saletan in 1954, was also appropriated for use in a hymn entitled Glory Be to God on High.

Sule Greg Wilson produced a version based upon Allen/Ware/Garrison, as well as upon "Row, Michael Row", by Jane Hunter and Moving Star Hall singers. The Wilson version features Tuscarora vocalist Pura Fé (with Wilson on instruments and background vocals). It was used for the end credits of The Librarian and the Banjo, Jim Carrier's 2013 film on Dena Epstein, author of the book, Sinful Tunes and Spirituals.

== See also ==
- Christian child's prayer § Spirituals
