= Will Franken =

American comedian

Will Franken (born June 30, 1973 in Sedalia, Missouri) is an American character comedian and satirist whose work has been highly acclaimed in both the USA and Europe.

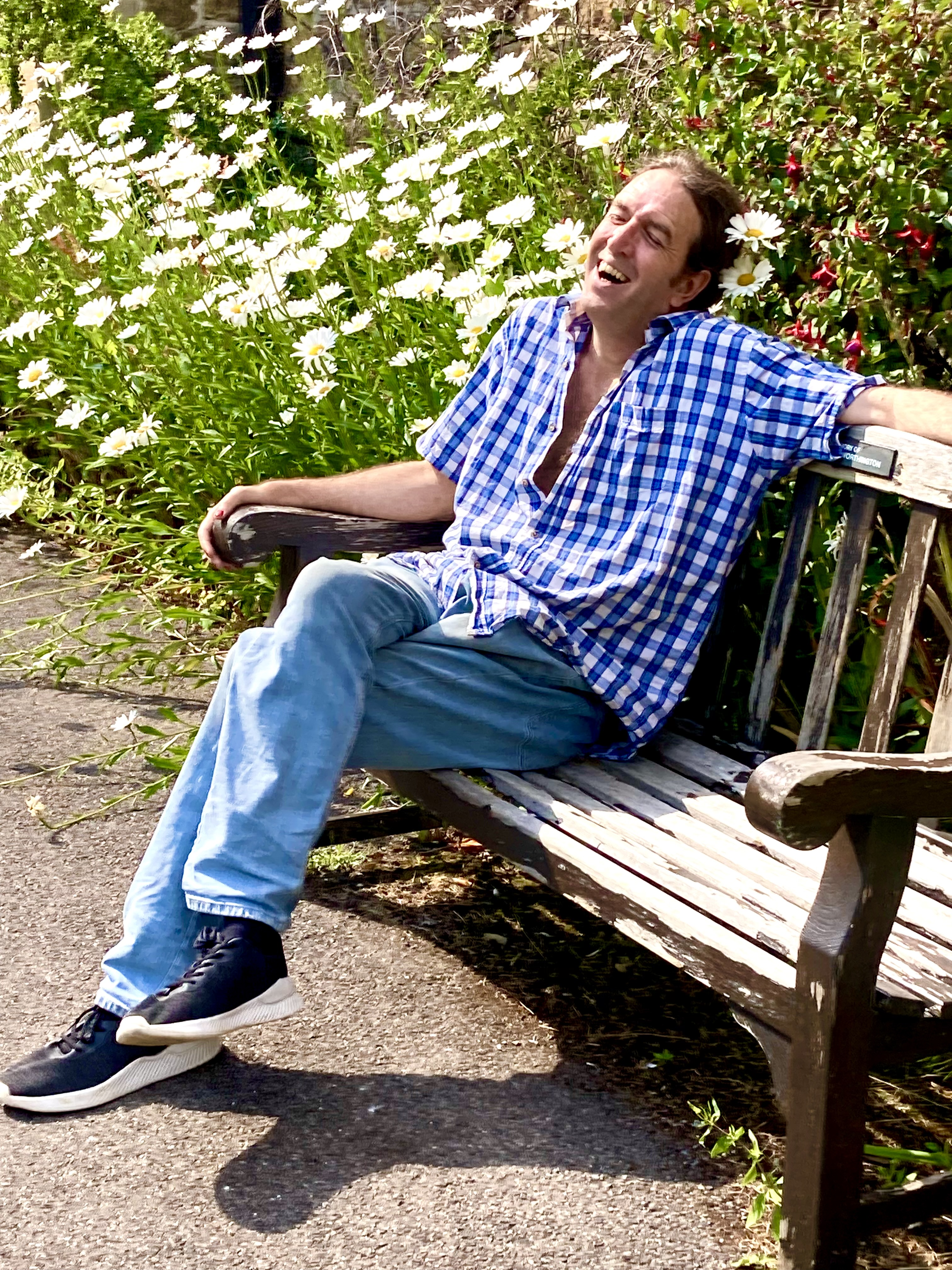
Will Franken Kent countryside 2023

== Life ==
Franken was born in Sedalia, Missouri. He has a degree in literature from Southwest Missouri State University. Franken was credited with uncovering some illuminating literary discrepancies between two extant copies of David Garrick's one act farce, Miss in Her Teens The spotlight which this discovery shone on the role of political censorship from the Lord Chamberlain's office in the 18th century, proved of such interest to those in the field that Franken's article about it was published in the Huntington Library Quarterly. He started performing comedy in the 2000s in San Francisco, appearing regularly at The Marsh Theater in the Mission District and the now defunct North Beach club The Purple Onion before moving to London in 2013.

In 2015, Franken lived as a woman, "Sarah", for seven months. To this day, many of his followers are still unsure whether this was a sincere pursuit or part of an elaborate Andy Kaufman style satire.

In 2016 he created the "Defining the Norm" awards at the Edinburgh Fringe, for "safety, sameness and sycophancy".

In 2020 Franken collaborated with English writer Alisha J. Prince on an unabridged, 13-hour audio production of Paradise Lost.

In October 2020, Franken launched a complaint against Folkestone and Hythe’s anti-nature gentrification of the area by saving a large tree condemned to be destroyed. Franken’s argument was upheld and the tree still stands.

In April 2024 Franken had an article published in The Philosopher journal.

In April 2025, Franken was shortlisted for The Observer/Anthony Burgess Prize in Arts Journalism, for his scathing review of Richard Gadd's Netflix series Baby Reindeer.

== Reception ==
Reviewing his one-man show, Good Luck With It in The New York Times in 2005, Jason Zinoman wrote: What elevates Mr. Franken above your garden-variety comedian is an erudite wit and a highly developed sense of the absurd. Zinoman went on to say in summing up Franken's satire: What is constant is a disgust with the mediocrity of contemporary culture, suburban living, and the hypocrisy of well-meaning liberals. [https://www.nytimes.com/2005/08/18/theater/reviews/feelgood-comedy-with-a-dose-of-anger.html Franken was awarded "Best Comedian" of 2005 by the SF Weekly. The New York Times praised his "erudite wit and the kind of highly developed sense of the absurd". The SF Weekly awarded him "Best Comedian" and a few weeks later, the SF Bay Guardian gave him the award for "Best Alternative to Psychedelic Drugs" This same year he also received his first national press from both the New York Times and the San Francisco Chronicle. A review of his 2012 Edinburgh fringe show praised the "vivacity of his characterisations" and wrote that he "baffles conventional thinking".

His 2013 Soho Theatre show received mixed reviews from The Arts Desk and the Evening Standard.

A review of his 2014 Edinburgh fringe show praised his inventiveness. A review on Chortle praised "his chameleonic ability to inhabit so many characters".

The Guardian wrote of Franken, “Sometimes you see a comedian who has so much talent and such little recognition, you feel like there’s an imbalance in the world. Some people are so inventive that it makes them almost inaccessible to a wider audience.”
