= Boil Them Cabbage Down =

American folk song

"Boil Them Cabbage Down" (Roud 4211, also "Bile 'Em Cabbage Down") is an American folk song. Hoecakes are small cornmeal cakes that were cooked on a type of iron pan called a hoe. A breakfast of hoecakes and cabbage soup testifies to the humble origins of this song. According to Alan Lomax, musicologist and folklorist formerly of the Library of Congress, this tune was originally associated with African slaves brought from Niger.

Notable versions of the song have been played by such artists as Pete Seeger, Ruby Jane Smith and the Smothers Brothers. Sam Hinton sings the song in the album How the West Was Won (1959).

== Content ==
As Byron Arnold and Bob Halli noted in An Alabama Songbook, the song, musically and lyrically, is far from stable, with verses being swapped at will by the performers, and is interchangeable with many other songs, including "Old Joe Clark" and "Cindy".

=== Music ===
This simple tune is often used in old-time music circles to teach young folks how to play the mandolin, fiddle, banjo, mountain dulcimer and/or guitar. The following is the basic tune with the lyrics of the chorus. These tabs assume the player has a diatonically fretted instrument tuned to one of the 1-5-8 open tunings like G-D-G or D-A-D, such as one might find on a mountain dulcimer or a stick dulcimer.

2 2 2 2 3 3
Boil them cab-bage down, down.

2 2 2 2 1 1
Turn them hoe-cakes 'round, 'round.

2 2 2 2 3 3 3 3 3
The on-ly song that I can sing is

2 2 1 1 0
Boil them cab-bage down.

Here's the same tune tabbed for a chromatically fretted instrument like a tenor guitar (or banjo) tuned GDgd (or other 1-5-8-12 tuning).

4 4 4 4 5 5
Boil them cab-bage down, down.

4 4 4 4 2 2
Turn them hoe-cakes 'round, 'round.

4 4 4 4 5 5 5 5 5
The on-ly song that I can sing is

4 4 2 2 0
Boil them cab-bage down.

The tablature below is for violin (or viola), using the 2-3 finger pattern most students learn first. Only 2nd and 3rd fingers are close together. The numbers followed by a dash are held twice as long as the rest of the notes. It may be played on any string, though it is usually done on the D string.

2 2 2 2 3 - 3 -
Bile 'em cab-bage down, down.

2 2 2 2 1 - 1-
Bake 'em bisc-uits brown, brown

2 2 2 2 3 3 3 3
On-ly tune that I did learn was

2 2 1 1 0 - 0 -
Bile ‘em cab-bage down, down.

=== Lyrics ===
There are many different verses to this song, and only a few popular ones are listed here:

Went up on a mountain
(To) give my horn a blow, blow.
Thought I heard my true love say,
"Yonder comes my beau."

CHORUS:

Boil them cabbage down, down.
Turn them hoecakes 'round, 'round.
The only song that I can sing is
Boil them cabbage down.

Possum in a 'simmon tree,
Raccoon on the ground.
Raccoon says, you son-of-a-gun,
Shake some 'simmons down.

(Chorus)

Someone stole my old coon dog.
Wish they'd bring him back.
He chased the big hogs through the fence,
And the little ones through the crack.

(Chorus)

Met a possum in the road,
Blind as he could be.
Jumped the fence and whipped my dog
And bristled up at me.

(Chorus)

Butter-fly, he has wings of gold.
Fire-fly, wings of flame.
Bed-bug, he got no wings at all,
But he gets there just the same.

(Chorus)

Once I had an old grey mule,
his name was Simon Slick.
He'd roll his eyes, and back his ears,
and how that mule would kick.

(Chorus)

How that mule would kick,
he'd kick with his dying breath.
He shoved his hind feet down his throat,
and kicked himself to death,

(Chorus)
