= It Must Have Been Something I Said! =

Live album by Smothers Brothers
- Released: April 15, 1964
- Venue: The Ice House, Pasadena, California
- Genre: Comedy, folk
- Label: Mercury

Smothers Brothers chronology
Curb Your Tongue, Knave (1963)	It Must Have Been Something I Said! (1964)	Tour de Farce: American History and Other Unrelated Subjects (1964)

"It Must Have Been Something I Said!" is the fifth comedy album from the Smothers Brothers (released April 15, 1964, on Mercury Records). It reached number 23 on the Billboard Pop Albums chart. The single "Jenny Brown" had peaked at #84 on the 1963 Pop Singles chart; however, the recording here is a different, "live" version. The album was recorded at The Ice House in Pasadena, California. The cover photograph showed Dick having just smashed a guitar over Tom's head, thereby justifying the album title as a word balloon.

== Track listing ==
1. "Slithery Dee" (0:32) – A Shel Silverstein song.
2. "Hiawatha" (9:25) – "Hiawatha, he went hunting, went to hunt the bunny rabbit. Had to make a pair of mittens, from the bunny rabbit's fur." Really.
3. "The Shrimp" (1:03) – Tom tries to start a new dance craze.
4. "Crabs Walk Sideways" (5:10) – A song about the star-crossed lovers Herman the lobster and Sally the crab. It is never going to work out.
5. "Michael, Row the Boat Ashore" (1:58)
6. "Civil War Song" (2:11) – "One brother wore blue and one brother wore grey."
7. "Jenny Brown" (5:05) – The story of the lovely "teen-angel" Jenny Brown and her rotten sense of humor.
8. "Black is the Color of My True Love's Hair" (4:14)
9. "Population Explosion" (1:33) – Tom offers a practical solution to a serious problem based on his experience raising rabbits.
10. "Anne Marie and Jean Pierre" (1:42) – A song about two young French lovers.
11. "Carnival" (6:12) – From Black Orpheus and another nice duet.

== Personnel ==
- Dick Smothers – vocals, double bass
- Tom Smothers – vocals, guitar

== Chart positions ==
Year	Chart	Position
1964	Billboard Pop Albums	23
