= The Smothers Brothers Comedy Hour =

American comedy series

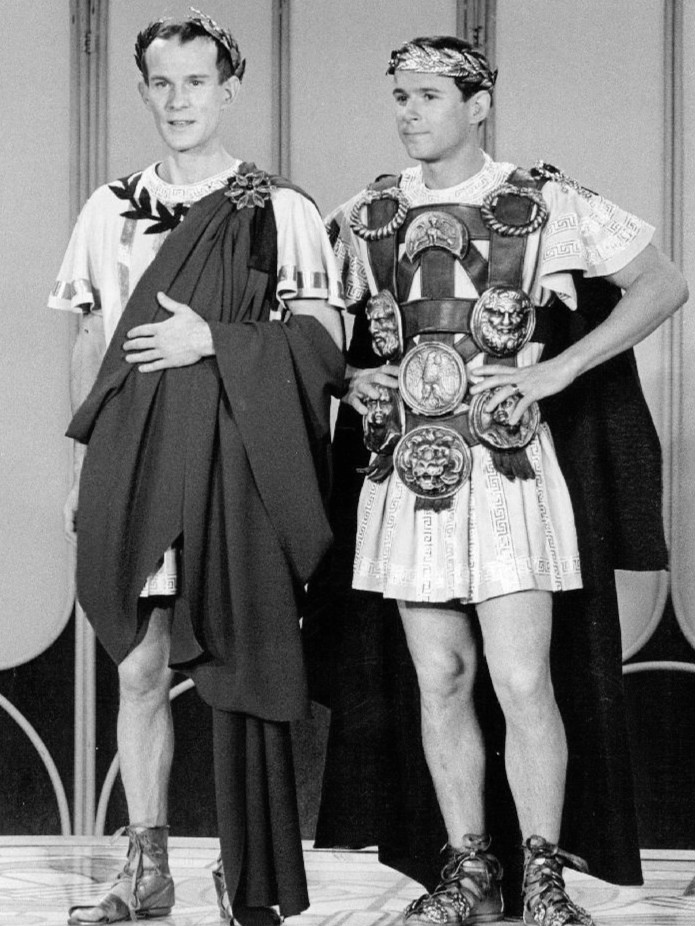
- Tom and Dick as Romans in a 1967 skit
- Genre: Comedy; Variety
- Directed by: Bill Davis; Stan Harris; Tim Kiley; Marty Pasetta
- Starring: Dick Smothers; Tom Smothers; Pat Paulsen
- Narrated by: Roger Carroll (announcer)
- Theme music composer: Mason Williams; Nancy Ames
- Opening theme: "The Brothers Theme"
- Country of origin: United States
- Original language: English
- No. of seasons: 3
- No. of episodes: 73 (1 unaired)

Production
- Executive producer: Ken Fritz
- Producers: Allan Blye; Ernest Chambers; Saul Ilson; George Sunga
- Camera setup: Multi-camera
- Running time: 45– 50 minutes
- Production companies: Comedic Productions, Inc.

Original release
- Network: CBS
- Release: February 5, 1967 – April 20, 1969

Related
- The Smothers Brothers Show (1965–66); The Smothers Brothers Show (1975)

The Smothers Brothers Comedy Hour is an American comedy and variety show television series hosted by the Smothers Brothers that aired on CBS from February 5, 1967, to April 20, 1969.

The series was a major success, especially considering it was scheduled against the major NBC television series Bonanza, with content that appealed to contemporary youth viewership with daring political satire humor and significant popular music performers such as Buffalo Springfield, Pete Seeger, the Beatles, and the Who. Despite this success, continual conflicts with network executives over content led to the show being abruptly pulled from the schedule in violation of the Smothers' contract in 1969.

== History ==
The evolution of The Comedy Hour was unique to a medium that was fearful of change. The show debuted in the winter of 1967 as a slightly "hip" version of the typical comedy-variety show of its era. But within weeks it rapidly evolved into a program that extended the boundaries of what was considered permissible in television satire. The roster of writers and performers included Hal Goldman and Al Gordon (who had written for The Jack Benny Program), Jim Stafford, Steve Martin, Don Novello, Rob Reiner, Lorenzo Music, perennial presidential candidate Pat Paulsen, Bob Einstein ("Officer Judy"), and Leigh French ("Share a Little Tea with Goldie"). The show also introduced audiences to pop singer Jennifer Warnes (originally billed as Jennifer Warren or simply "Jennifer"), who was a regular on the series. The television premiere of Mason Williams' hit record, "Classical Gas," took place on the show, and Williams himself received an Emmy for his work as a staff writer; during the show's run, Warnes provided vocals for several tracks of Williams' album, The Mason Williams Ear Show.

=== Musical guests ===
The series showcased new musical artists that other comedy-variety shows rarely gave airtime to, due to the nature of their music or their political affiliations. George Harrison, Joan Baez, Buffalo Springfield, Cass Elliot, Harry Belafonte, Cream, the Who, Donovan, the Doors, Janis Ian, Yank Barry, Jefferson Airplane, Peter, Paul and Mary, Spanky and Our Gang, Steppenwolf, Simon & Garfunkel, Ray Charles, Hello People, Pete Seeger and Ike and Tina Turner were showcased during the latter years of the show despite the advertiser-sensitive nature of their music.

Seeger's appearance on the season two premiere which aired on September 10, 1967, was his first on network commercial television in 17 years since being blacklisted in 1950. His performance of "Waist Deep in the Big Muddy" was dropped from the broadcast after his refusal to comply with CBS's request to remove the sixth verse. The song, its story related to the present by the controversial stanza, was a metaphor for President Lyndon B. Johnson and his Vietnam War policy. Seeger was eventually allowed to reappear on the show to perform the song again on Episode 24 later that season.

In 1968, the show broadcast several promotional films (later known as "music videos") for the Beatles' songs "Hey Jude" and "Revolution" and several songs of the Bee Gees. Before a rowdy crowd at the Los Angeles Forum, Jimi Hendrix dedicated "I Don't Live Today" to the Smothers Brothers, as heard on The Jimi Hendrix Box Set.

=== Controversies and cancellation ===
The show became both popular and controversial for those same references to youth culture and the issues that both interested and affected this particular target audience. Whereas most older and more conservative audiences were tuning into shows such as the western Bonanza, the younger, more liberal generation—ages 15–25—were watching the Smothers' more socially relevant humor. However, despite the reputation both brothers earned, Tom Smothers later acknowledged in 2006 that he was in reality the "little bit looser" of the two brothers, stating that he and Dick "still disagree about everything" and even describing Dick as "more conservative politically" and "very pragmatic."

The brothers soon found themselves in regular conflicts with CBS' network censors. At the start of the 1968–69 season, the network ordered that the Smothers deliver their shows finished and ready for air ten days before airdate so that the censors could edit the shows as necessary. In the season premiere, CBS deleted an entire segment featuring Belafonte singing "Lord, Don't Stop the Carnival" against a backdrop of the havoc during the 1968 Democratic National Convention, along with two lines from a satire of their main competitor, Bonanza. As the year progressed, battles over content continued, including a David Steinberg sermon about Moses and the Burning Bush.

With some local stations making their own deletions of controversial sketches or comments, the continuing problems over the show reached a boiling point after CBS showed a rerun on March 9, 1969. The network explained the decision by stating that because that week's episode did not arrive in time to be previewed, it would not be shown. In that program, Joan Baez paid tribute to her then-husband David Harris, who was entering jail after refusing military service, while comedian Jackie Mason made a joke about children "playing doctor." When the show finally did air, three weeks later, the network allowed Baez to state that her husband was in prison, but edited out the reason.

Despite the conflict, the show was picked up for the 1969–70 season on March 14, seemingly ending the debate over the show's status. An episode slated for an April 13 broadcast was refused by CBS because the brothers had brought back Steinberg to perform another sermon routine; the original sermon on October 27, 1968, had been met with hundreds of angry viewer letters. However, the episode was aired in Canada on CTV on a pre-release, which was a common occurrence at that time. Network CEO and president William S. Paley abruptly canceled the show on April 4, 1969, citing the Smothers' failure to meet the contractual pre-air delivery dates required for local affiliate screening. Another of the network's presidents, Robert Wood, stated that it became evident that the brothers "were unwilling to accept the criteria of taste established by CBS." Hee Haw replaced the Smothers Brothers that summer.

This cancelation led the brothers to file a breach of contract suit against the network. On April 6, 1973, after four years of litigation, a federal court ruled in favor of the Smotherses and ordered CBS to pay them US$776,300 (equivalent to $5.63 million in 2025), and in 1975, the duo returned to television, hosting the tamer (and unsuccessful) The Smothers Brothers Show that aired on NBC.

The show won the Emmy Award that year for Outstanding Writing for a Comedy, Variety or Music. The story of its cancelation is the subject of a 2002 documentary film, Smothered: The Censorship Struggles of the Smothers Brothers Comedy Hour.

== Revival ==
In February 1970, The Return of the Smothers Brothers aired. The hour-long special was written by Tom Smothers, David Steinberg, and Bob Einstein. Guests included Peter Fonda and Glen Campbell.

The Smothers Brothers Comedy Hour was revived for the 1988–89 television season. The revival, which included the return of cast regular Pat Paulsen alongside new performers, lasted one season. The revived Smothers Brothers Comedy Hour began production during the 1988 Writers Guild of America strike, resulting in the brothers resorting to performing their own material.

In 1993, the series was repackaged for broadcast on the E! Network featuring introductions by the Smothers Brothers and new interview footage by participants in the original series.

== Home media ==
In celebration of the 50th Anniversary of The Smothers Brothers, The Smothers Brothers Comedy Hour was first released on DVD by Time-Life Entertainment with "The Best of Season 3" featuring 11 episodes from the third and final season of the show, presented in its uncensored and uncut original broadcast form, including extra features that were never-before-released on DVD. Time Life released a second DVD collection on October 20, 2009, "The Best of Season 2." Previously, in 2002, Time Life Entertainment released Bravo's documentary special, Smothered: The Censorship Struggles of The Smothers Brothers Comedy Hour on DVD.
