= Tom Smothers =

American comedian, actor, composer and musician (1937–2023)

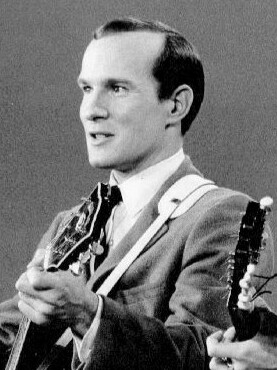
- Smothers in 1967
- Born: Thomas Bolyn Smothers III; February 2, 1937; New York City, U.S.
- Died: December 26, 2023 (aged 86); Santa Rosa, California, U.S.
- Education: San Jose State University
- Occupations: Comedian; musician; composer; actor
- Years active: 1959–2010, 2019
- Spouses: Stephanie Shorr (m. 1963; div. 1967) Rochelle Robley (m. 1974; div. 1976) Marcy Carriker (m. 1990)
- Children: 3
- Relatives: Dick Smothers (brother)
- Musical career
- Genre: Folk
- Instruments: Guitar; vocals
- Formerly of: Smothers Brothers; Plastic Ono Band

Thomas Bolyn Smothers III (February 2, 1937 – December 26, 2023) was an American comedian, actor, composer, and musician, widely known as half of the musical comedy duo the Smothers Brothers, alongside his younger brother Dick. In the 1960s they were known for their network comedy and variety shows, The Smothers Brothers Show and The Smothers Brothers Comedy Hour.

Smothers and John Lennon played acoustic guitar during the live recording of Lennon's 1969 song "Give Peace a Chance".

== Early life ==
Thomas Bolyn Smothers III was born on February 2, 1937, at the Fort Jay army post hospital on Governors Island in New York City, the son of Ruth (née Remick), a homemaker, and Major Thomas B. Smothers, a United States Army officer who died a POW of the Japanese in April 1945. The younger Smothers later grew up in Altadena, Tujunga, and Redondo Beach, California.

As a child, Smothers played guitar and piano by ear due to difficulty reading sheet music; Smothers would be diagnosed with dyslexia at age 31. Beginning in fifth grade, he played guitar in bands formed with friends and began incorporating humor with his music and in-school interactions. Athletically, he grew up competing in gymnastics.

Smothers first attended Verdugo Hills High School before transferring to Redondo Union High School as a senior. At Redondo Beach, he and his brother sang in the school's madrigal choir, Tom as a bass and Dick as a tenor; Tom graduated from Redondo Union in 1955. Smothers then enrolled at San Jose State College (now San Jose State University) in 1956 as an advertising major and competed at pole vault on the track team as a freshman in 1956–57. Then in 1957–58, Smothers competed on the gymnastics team, where he tied for first place on the parallel bars at the 1958 State College Gymnastics Championships.

== Career ==
Inspired by the popularity of The Kingston Trio's "Tom Dooley", the Smothers Brothers initially wanted to be folk musicians.

After Dick transferred to San Jose State in 1957, Tom and Dick began performing music at San Jose nightclubs, with audiences mostly of other college students. In January 1959, the Smothers brothers were discovered by a detective who became their first manager and invited them to an audition at the Purple Onion, a nightclub in San Francisco. The following month, the brothers left San Jose State to focus full-time on working in entertainment, after the Purple Onion asked them to substitute for other acts who were ill. Their show was so successful that the Purple Onion extended their original two-week contract to 16 weeks; the brothers returned to the Purple Onion for another 16-week contract after playing a Lake Tahoe club in the summer of 1959.

In February 1960, the Smothers Brothers made their professional debut at Aspen, Colorado. Tom recalled in 2006 interview:

I did all the introductions. I'd just make up stuff for every song. And Dickie said, "Why don't you try repeating some of that stuff?" I said, "I don't know." I didn't know that you could repeat the stuff. And I started repeating it and Dickie would say, "That's wrong." And pretty soon he'd say, "That's wrong, you're stupid." It sort of became an argument.

Tom's first foray into the medium of television was as a regular on The Steve Allen Show in 1961. He followed that role with a single episode of Burke's Law.

The Smothers Brothers next appeared on the CBS sitcom The Smothers Brothers Show from 1965 to 1966. Tom felt that the show did not play to the brothers' strengths and wanted creative control over their next venture.

=== The Smothers Brothers Comedy Hour and aftermath ===
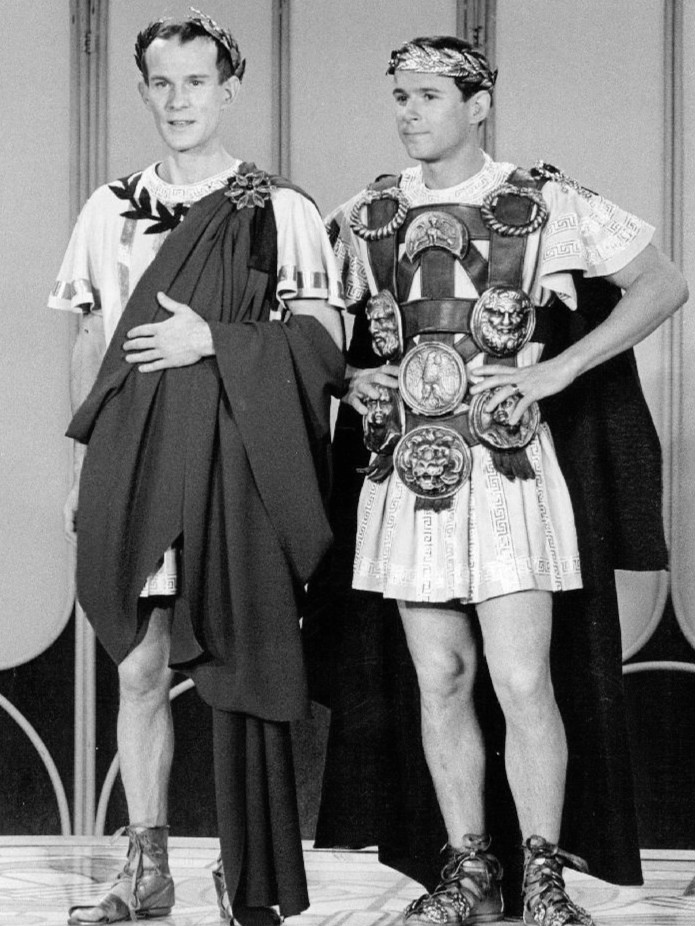
Tom with Dick Smothers in a publicity photo for The Smothers Brothers Comedy Hour in 1968

Tom Smothers negotiated creative control over their next CBS show, a variety show titled The Smothers Brothers Comedy Hour in 1967. The brothers had conflicts with the CBS standards and practices department with jokes about religion, recreational drugs, sex, and the Vietnam War, topics considered taboo on primetime television of the era. The brothers' political action on the air led to their show's demise, with David Steinberg later claiming "The most innovative variety show on television shut down because of political pressure." In 2006, Tom revealed that he and his brother actually disagreed on politics. During the same years, Tom recorded mainstream songs, such as "Can't Help Falling in Love with You". Tom later stated, "When the Smothers Brothers came on the air we had no political point of view or social consciousness, it just evolved as the show was on the air."

=== Rock and roll, "Give Peace a Chance" ===
Smothers introduced some musical acts at the Monterey Pop Festival in 1967. As he became more politically active, he befriended similarly inclined celebrities like John Lennon.

In 1969, Smothers and Lennon played acoustic guitars on Lennon's recording of his single "Give Peace a Chance" (Smothers' name was also mentioned in the song). The song was written and performed during Lennon's and Yoko Ono's "Bed-in" honeymoon on June 1, 1969, in Room 1742 at the Queen Elizabeth Hotel in Montreal, Quebec, Canada. Smothers can be seen in the hotel room in the 1988 documentary film Imagine: John Lennon.

=== Political involvement ===
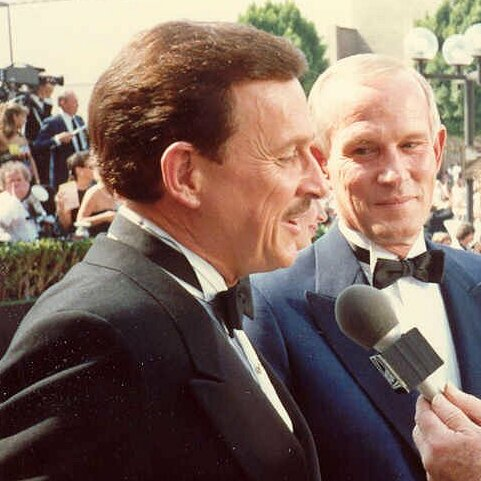
Dick (left) and Tom Smothers in August 1988

After Comedy Hour was canceled, Smothers became outspoken in politics.

I lost perspective, my sense of humor. I became a poster boy for the First Amendment, freedom of speech, and I started buying into it. It was about three years when I was deadly serious about everything.... I'm still politically active, I'm still angry, but I've got it in the right position now.

In the 1970s, Smothers mocked Bill Cosby for not taking a stand on political issues of the day, such as civil rights.

At the time I was very volatile, and thought everyone should take a stand. I guess I said something that really pissed him. For a couple years after that, I'd say, 'Hiya Bill, how ya doing?' and he wouldn't shake hands with me – you know, like, 'Fuck off.'

In October 1976, Cosby and Smothers attended a Playboy Mansion party. The tension between the two culminated in Cosby punching Smothers in the head.

Smothers's politics were in marked contrast to those of his brother Dick, whom Tom described as "more conservative". Tom publicly criticized Democratic president Lyndon B. Johnson and his involvement in and perpetuation of the Vietnam War. Tom stated in 2006 that the duo's real-life political and philosophical differences were a key part of their ability to maintain their act for as long as they did.

=== Film roles ===
In motion pictures, Smothers portrayed corporate-executive-turned-tap-dancing-magician Donald Beeman in Brian De Palma's 1972 film, Get to Know Your Rabbit. He also played a banker in Silver Bears. He later portrayed Reverend Spike in Serial (1980).

In 1973, he voiced Ted E. Bear (Theodore Edward Bear) in the DePatie-Freleng NBC animated Christmas special The Bear Who Slept Through Christmas. Ten years later, he voiced Ted E. Bear again for its Halloween sequel The Great Bear Scare.

In 1980, Smothers starred in the film There Goes the Bride. In 1982, he played with an ensemble cast in Pandemonium in which he was a brave Canadian Mountie chasing down a serial killer at a cheerleader camp. In 1983 he appeared in an episode of the UK TV series Tales of the Unexpected. He also voiced one of the characters in the cartoon Christmas movie Precious Moments: Timmy's Special Delivery in 1993.

=== Later work ===
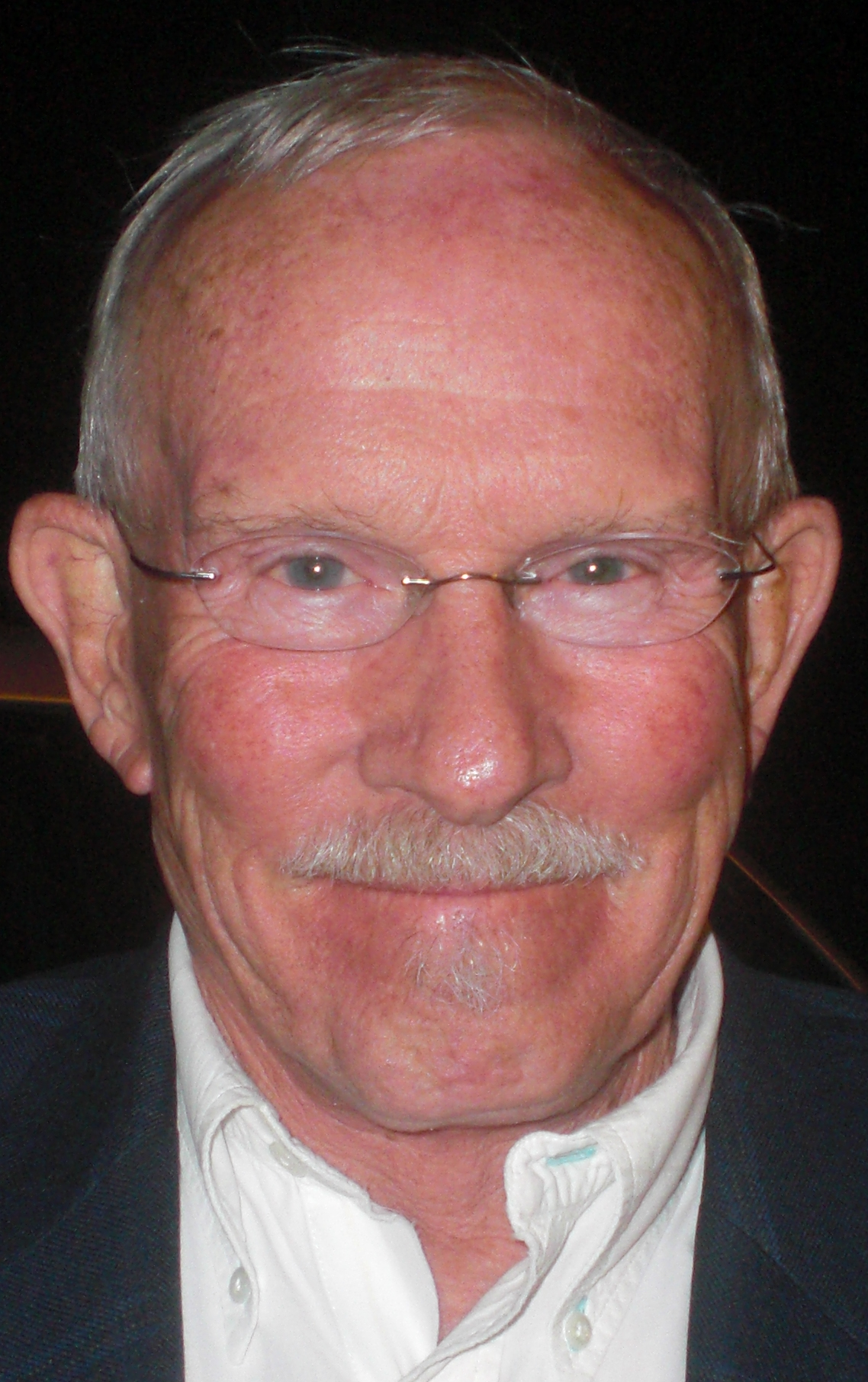
Smothers in 2011

The Smothers Brothers hosted the NBC sketch comedy show Saturday Night Live in 1982, with a parody of The Tonight Show as its opening sketch, with Tom playing Johnny Carson, interviewing Dick. The sketch derailed after Tom (in character as Johnny) tried to goad Dick into talking more about Tom.

During the 1980s and 1990s, the brothers turned to television commercials, filming spots for Kentucky Fried Chicken and Planters peanuts, in which Tom invoked his famous line, "Mom always did like you best!". Tom made a solo endorsement for Cheetos.

In 2007, Tom and Dick Smothers filmed a series of 30-second commercials and promotional spots for the River Rock Casino in Geyserville, California.

To augment their act in recent years, "Yo-Yo Man" became part of their shows. Tom Smothers had created the mostly non-speaking character in the late 1960s, a comedic performer of tricks using a yo-yo. The term "Yo-Yo Man" is registered in his name. In their 2008 tour, Yo-Yo Man was listed as the group's opening act.

In 2008, during the 60th Primetime Emmy Awards, Smothers was awarded a special Emmy. In 1969, when he was head writer of The Smothers Brothers Comedy Hour, the writing staff was awarded the Emmy for Outstanding Writing in a Comedic Series. Smothers had refused to let his name be on the list of writers nominated for the Emmy because he felt his name was too contentious. The award at the 2008 ceremony was presented by Steve Martin, one of the writers who originally won the award.

In December 2009, Tom and Dick both guest starred in a 21st-season episode of The Simpsons that also featured Cooper, Peyton, and Eli Manning.

The Smothers Brothers announced in May 2010 that their shows at The Orleans near Las Vegas would be "farewell performances" marking their retirement from touring.

On May 6, 2011, the American Civil Liberties Union's Sonoma County chapter honored Smothers with its Jack Green Civil Liberties Award for his work against television censorship and for speaking out for peace and civil liberties.

Tom and Dick Smothers reunited in 2019 to mark the 50th anniversary of The Smothers Brothers Comedy Hour's abrupt cancellation.

On December 11, 2022, in an episode of CBS News Sunday Morning, the brothers announced they would go on tour in 2023.

== Personal life and death ==
Smothers was the owner of Remick Ridge Vineyards in Sonoma County, California, which he established in 1977 and sold in 2023. Smothers and his wife, Marcy Carriker, have two children, Bo (born 1991) and Riley Rose (born 1996). He also had a son from his first marriage, Thomas Bolyn Smothers IV (Tom Jr.), who died in April 2023, and one grandson, Phoenix Parrish-Smothers. Tom and Dick had a sister, Sherry, born in September 1941 in Pasadena, California; she died in April 2023. Also in 2023, Smothers announced he had been diagnosed with stage two lung cancer. He died from the disease at his home in Santa Rosa, California, on December 26 of that year at age 86.

== See also ==
- List of celebrities who own wineries and vineyards
