= Tour de Farce: American History and Other Unrelated Subjects =

Live album by Smothers Brothers
- Released: November 1, 1964
- Recorded: 1964 at The Ice House, Pasadena, California
- Genre: Comedy, folk
- Label: Mercury

Smothers Brothers chronology
It Must Have Been Something I Said! (1964)	Tour de Farce: American History and Other Unrelated Subjects (1964)	Aesop's Fables (1965)

Tour de Farce: American History and Other Unrelated Subjects is the sixth comedy album by the Smothers Brothers (released November 1, 1964, on Mercury Records). It reached number 58 on the Billboard Pop Albums chart. Recorded at The Ice House in Pasadena, California. The back of the album contains the note: "For special enjoyment, try playing your old Smothers Brothers albums at 45 rpm."

== Track listing ==
1. "Siblings" (3:19) – Dick says Tom was not as well loved because he was adopted, and Tom complains about not being well treated as a child.
2. "That's My Song" (2:57) – Sung straight.
3. "American History: II-A" (5:02) – Tom's comments on the Pilgrims and Johnny Appleseed, noting that the Pilgrims' landing was all the more exciting due to how slippery Plymouth Rock was.
4. "Mediocre Fred" (1:41) – Tom sings the story of a boring man who becomes more exciting during a full moon.
5. "The Measles Song" (2:07) – Tom sings a folk song about a disease.
6. "Since My Canary Died" (5:40) – A lament for a dead pet.
7. "American History: II-B" (5:27 – Tom continues his dissertating, this time on Paul Bunyan, Billy the Kid, and George Washington. It is here that we learn about Paul Bunyan's "Big Blue Puma."
8. "Eskimo Dog" (5:04) – A different take on the folk song "Whiskey in the Jar."
9. "She's Gone Forever" (3:47) – Another one sung straight by the brothers.
10. "Life and the Song of Life" (3:35)
11. "Time and the Song of Time" (1:48)
12. "Wagon Wheels" (1:38) (1st pressing only)
13. "The Military Lovers" (0:50) (1st pressing only) – Tom rewrites the words to "The Marines' Hymn."
14. "The Put-On Song (0:40) (1st pressing only)

== Personnel ==
- Dick Smothers – vocals, double bass
- Tom Smothers – vocals, guitar

== Chart positions ==
Year	Chart	Position
1965	Billboard Pop Albums	58
