= Think Ethnic =

Think Ethnic!

Studio album by Smothers Brothers
- Released: February 15, 1963
- Genres: Comedy, folk
- Label: Mercury

Smothers Brothers chronology
The Two Sides of the Smothers Brothers (1962)	Think Ethnic! (1963)	Curb Your Tongue, Knave (1963)

Think Ethnic! is the third comedy album of the Smothers Brothers, released February 15, 1963, on Mercury Records. It reached number 27 on the Billboard Pop Albums chart in 1964, and was nominated for a Grammy award.

== Track listing ==
1. "Soap" (0:30) – A song about "eight bars"...
2. "Black Is the Colour of My True Love's Hair" (3:04) – Turned into "Black Is the Colour of My Love's True Hair" [But only her Hairdresser knows--/("Does she or Doesn't she?")--/Only her Hairdresser knows!] (a play on the advertising 'tag line' at that time for Clairol hair-coloring products).
3. "The Fox" (6:17) – Tom decides that this song about a fox throwing a duck across his back would be enhanced by quacking, but Dick disagrees.
4. "I Never Will Marry" (3:05)
5. "Venezuelan Rain Dance" (6:50) – In which the Venezuelans pray to the rain god, Shane, to "come back." (The tune is "Hava Nagila")
6. "Daniel Boone" (1:16) – Who was "a trailer and a tractor" according to Tom; naturally, Dick had just stated that Daniel Boone was "a trader and a trapper."
7. "My Old Man" (3:17) – In which Tom warns Dick not to make a mistake about his old man who is a "cotton-pickin' finger-lickin' chicken plucker", after he had (purposely) stumbled through lines about his old man being a refrigerator repairman ("refriraterpairmn").
8. "The Wreck Of The Old 49" (2:14) – Not a folk song, but a song written by Shel Silverstein.
9. "Santa Claus Is Coming To Town" (0:25) – according to Tom, he is not.
10. "The Saga Of John Henry" (8:50) – Before Tom is able to get the song going properly, there are two false starts, both relating to Tom's questions about what John Henry, the steel driving man, could have done when he was "just a little baby." From Tom's dramatic narration between verses, we learn that John Henry apparently did a lot of hitting and spitting.
11. "Mary Was Pretty" (2:07) – Dedicated to Dick's then-wife (named Linda). In the list of girls in the song, Linda was the last, thus the best.

== Personnel ==
- Dick Smothers – vocals, double bass
- Tom Smothers – vocals, guitar

== Chart positions ==
Year	Chart	Position
1964	Billboard Pop Albums	27
