= David Carroll (musician) =

- Also known as: Nook Schreier
- Born: Rodell Walter Schreier; October 15, 1913; Taylorville, Illinois, U.S.
- Died: March 22, 2008 (aged 94) San Jose, California, U.S.
- Genres: Easy listening
- Occupation: Musical director

David Carroll (born Rodell Schreier; October 15, 1913 – March 22, 2008) was an American studio arranger, conductor, and musical director.

== Biography ==
Carroll was born Rodell Schreier, the son of Mr. and Mrs. Herman J. Schreier, in Taylorville, Illinois. He graduated from high school in Taylorville and studied music arranging at Columbia University.

Carroll wrote and recorded many songs of his own, played by musicians such as Tiny Hill, Bobby Christian, Earl Backus, Paul Severson, Mike Simpson, Sarah Vaughan, Vic Damone and Patti Page. While Carroll was musical director at Mercury Records (1951 to early 1960s), Quincy Jones composed some songs for him.

In his later years, Carroll was associated with the Smothers Brothers. He at first traveled with them as their conductor. Later he became general music director and then general manager of the organization. In the latter post he managed television and movie appearances, recordings, publishing interests and personal appearances.

He is credited with writing the advertising jingle for American Family Insurance in 1965.

Carroll died in San Jose, California at the age of 94.

== Commercial recordings ==
Carroll had two hit versions of "Melody of Love" in 1955, one, an instrumental (peaked at No. 8 on the Billboard Hot 100), the other featuring a narration by Paul Tremaine. He led many recording sessions in the 1950s and early 1960s, either under his name or under 'David Carroll & His Orchestra.' Nearly all of these sessions were for Mercury Records. He would have two charting albums, Let's Dance and Let's Dance Again, they would reach No. 21 and No. 6 respectively.
