= Smothers Brothers =

American singers, musicians and comedians

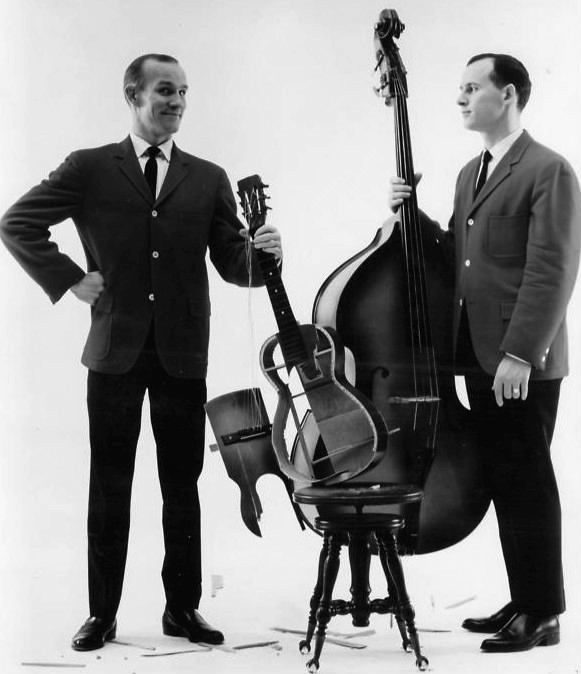
Smothers Brothers in 1965

The Smothers Brothers were the American duo of brothers Tom and Dick Smothers, who performed music and comedy. The brothers' trademark double act was performing folk songs (Tommy on acoustic guitar, Dick on double bass), with Tommy (the elder of the two) acting clueless and Dick as his straight man, which usually led to arguments. Tommy's signature line was "Mom always liked you best!"

In the late 1950s and early 1960s, the brothers frequently appeared on television variety shows and issued several popular record albums of their stage performances. Their own television variety show, The Smothers Brothers Comedy Hour, became one of the most controversial American TV programs of the Vietnam War era. Despite popular success, the brothers' (especially Tom's) penchant for material that was critical of the political mainstream and sympathetic to the emerging counterculture led to their firing by the CBS network in 1969.

The brothers continued to work, both independently and as a team, on stage, television, and in films until the pair's retirement in 2010.

== Early years ==
The brothers were both born on Governors Island in New York Harbor, where their father, Thomas B. Smothers Jr., a West Point graduate and U.S. Army officer, was stationed. Tom was born on February 2, 1937, and Dick was born on November 20, 1938. Major Smothers served in the 45th Infantry Regiment and died during World War II, while being transported from a Japanese prisoner of war camp in Fukuoka, Japan, to a POW camp in Mukden, Manchukuo. They were raised by their mother in the Los Angeles area.

They graduated from Redondo Union High School in Redondo Beach, California, and attended San Jose State University. After a brief time in a folk group called the Casual Quintet, the brothers made their first professional appearance as a duo in February 1959 at The Purple Onion in San Francisco. They were a popular act in clubs and released several successful top 40 albums for Mercury Records, the most successful being Curb Your Tongue, Knave! in 1964. Their first national television appearance was on The Jack Paar Show on January 28, 1961. On October 6, 1963, the Smothers Brothers made an appearance on the CBS variety series The Judy Garland Show which also showcased Barbra Streisand. Tom and Dick inherited Garland's time slot when their own variety series began in early 1967.

The brothers appeared in a segment of the television series Burke's Law, in 1964, in which they played two compulsive hoarders. Their first television series was a situation comedy, The Smothers Brothers Show (1965–1966), produced by Four Star Television. Tom played an angel come back to earth to oversee his brother Dick, who played a swinging bachelor. It did not do well in the ratings and had little of the music that was identified with the brothers. Tom said in 1969 that "Four Star gave me ulcers."

== The Smothers Brothers Comedy Hour ==
=== History ===
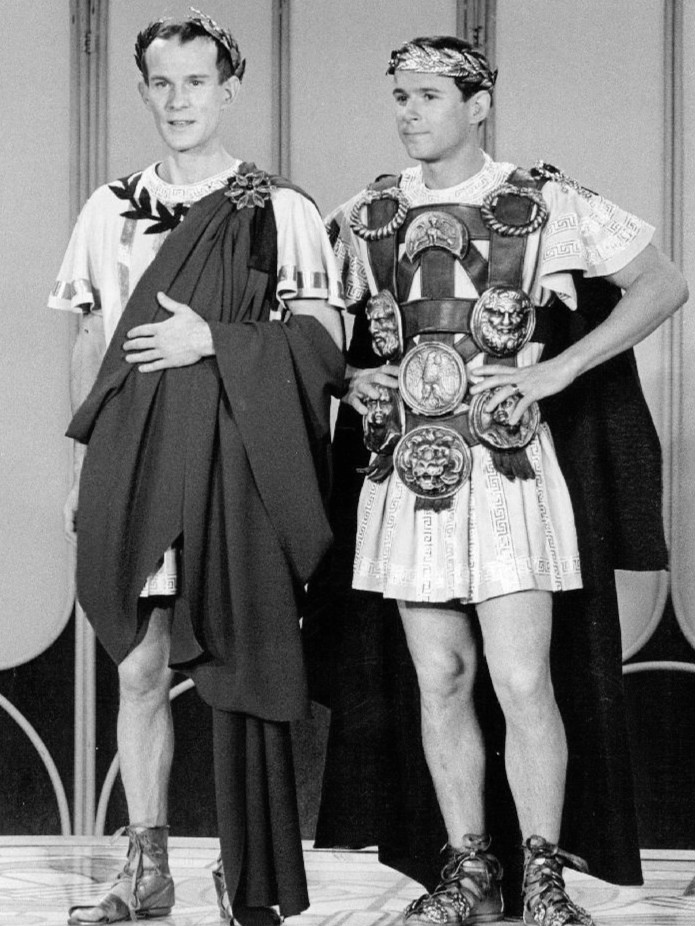
Smothers Brothers during a skit from a 1968 episode of The Smothers Brothers Comedy Hour.

The Smothers Brothers Comedy Hour started out as an only slightly "hip" version of the typical comedy-variety show of its era, but rapidly evolved into a show that extended the boundaries of what was considered permissible in television satire at that time. While the Smothers themselves were at the forefront of these efforts, credit also goes to the roster of writers and regular performers they brought to the show, including Steve Martin, Don Novello, Rob Reiner, presidential candidate Pat Paulsen, Bob Einstein, Albert Brooks, and resident hippie Leigh French. The show also introduced audiences to pop singer Jennifer Warnes (originally billed as Jennifer Warren or simply Jennifer), who was a regular on the series. The television premiere of Mason Williams' hit record, "Classical Gas", took place on the show; Williams was also the head writer for the series.

=== Musical guests ===
The series showcased new musical artists to whom other comedy-variety shows rarely gave airtime, due to the nature of their music or their political affiliations. George Harrison, Ringo Starr, Joan Baez, Buffalo Springfield, Cass Elliot, Harry Belafonte, Cream, Donovan, The Doors, Glen Campbell, Janis Ian, Jefferson Airplane, The Happenings, Peter, Paul and Mary, Spanky and Our Gang, Steppenwolf, Simon & Garfunkel, The Hollies, The Who, the original broadway cast of Hair and even Pete Seeger were showcased on the show, despite the advertiser-sensitive nature of their music.

Seeger's appearance was his first appearance on network television since being blacklisted in the 1950s. It became controversial because of his song choice, "Waist Deep in the Big Muddy", an anti-war song that the network considered to be an insult to President Lyndon Johnson and his Vietnam War policy. The song was censored on Seeger's first appearance but permitted on a later appearance.

In September 1968, the show broadcast in successive weeks "music videos" (called "promotional films" at the time) for The Beatles' double A-side single "Hey Jude" and "Revolution". Before a rowdy crowd at the Los Angeles Forum, Jimi Hendrix dedicated "I Don't Live Today" to the Smothers Brothers, as heard on The Jimi Hendrix Box Set.

=== The Who incident ===
The performance by the Who in 1967 was another defining moment in the series. As the group often did during that period, the Who destroyed their instruments at the conclusion of their performance of "My Generation", with the usual addition of mild explosives for light pyrotechnic effect. The piece ended with guitarist Pete Townshend grabbing Tommy's guitar and smashing it. On the Smothers Brothers show that night, a small amount of explosive was put into the small cannon that Keith Moon kept in his bass drum, but it did not go off during the rehearsal. Unbeknownst to Moon, a stage hand had added another explosive before the taping, and later Moon added another charge so that now there were three explosive charges in the cannon instead of one. When Moon detonated it, the explosion was so intense that a piece of cymbal shrapnel cut into Moon's arm; Moon is heard moaning in pain toward the end of the piece. Townshend, who had been in front of Moon's drums at the time, had his hair singed by the blast; he is seen putting out sparks in his hair before finishing the sketch with a visibly shocked Tommy Smothers. The blast contributed heavily to Townshend's long-term hearing loss.

=== Controversies and cancellation ===
With its focus having evolved toward a more youth-oriented one, the show became both popular and controversial. Three specific targets of satire – racism, the President of the United States, and the Vietnam War – wound up defining the show's content for the remainder of its run, eventually leading to its demise. However, contrary to popular belief, the brothers did not agree politically, with Tom being the one having more intention to challenge the political establishment; he even later described his younger brother as "more conservative politically."

The brothers soon found themselves in regular conflict with CBS's network censors. At the start of the 1968–69 season, the network ordered that the Smothers Brothers deliver their shows finished and ready to air 10 days before air date so that the censors could edit the shows as necessary. In the season premiere, CBS deleted the entire segment of Belafonte singing "Lord, Don't Stop the Carnival" against a backdrop of the havoc during the 1968 Democratic National Convention, along with two lines from a satire of their main competitor, Bonanza. As the year progressed, battles over content continued, including a David Steinberg sermon about Moses and the Burning Bush.

With some local stations making their own deletions of controversial skits or comments, the continuing problems over the show came to a head after CBS broadcast a rerun on March 9, 1969. The network explained the decision by stating that, because that week's episode did not arrive in time to be previewed, it would not be shown. In that program, Joan Baez paid tribute to her then-husband, David Harris, who was entering prison after refusing military service, while comedian Jackie Mason made a joke about children "playing doctor". When the show finally did air, two months later, the network allowed Baez to state that her husband was in prison, but edited out the reason.

Despite the conflict, the show was picked up for the 1969-70 season on March 14, seemingly ending the debate over its status. However, network CEO and President William S. Paley abruptly cancelled the show on April 4, 1969. The reason given by CBS was the brothers’ refusal to meet the pre-air delivery dates as specified by the network in order to accommodate review by the censors. This cancellation led the brothers to file a successful breach of contract suit against the network, although the suit failed to see the brothers or their show returned to the air. Despite this cancellation, the show went on to win the Emmy Award that year for best writing. The saga of the cancellation of the show is the subject of a 2002 documentary film, Smothered.

== Later career and retirement ==
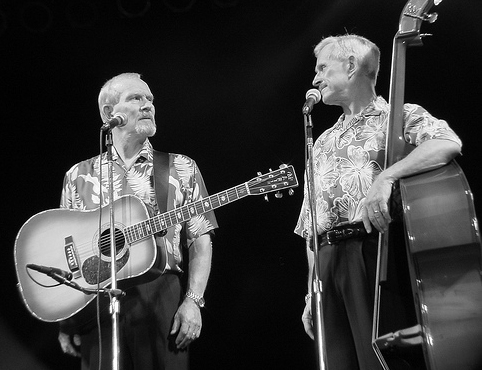
Smothers Brothers performing in August 2004

The Smothers Brothers starred in several other television shows. These included a 1968 CBS summer replacement series, The Summer Brothers Smothers Show; a 1970 ABC summer series, The Smothers Brothers Summer Show; an NBC series called The Smothers Brothers Show (1975), initially produced by Joe Hamilton (who concurrently produced The Carol Burnett Show, starring his wife), which was an unsuccessful attempt to recapture the look and feel of the original comedy-variety series without the controversy; and The Tom and Dick Smothers Brothers Specials I and II in 1980.

In February 1970, The Return of the Smothers Brothers aired. The hour-long special was written by Tom Smothers, David Steinberg, and Bob Einstein. Guests included Peter Fonda and Glen Campbell.

In 1978, the brothers starred in a replacement cast for I Love My Wife, Cy Coleman's and Michael Stewart's Broadway musical satire on the sexual revolution of the 1970s, directed by Gene Saks.

In 1981, Tom and Dick Smothers played non-brothers in a light TV drama, set in San Francisco, titled Fitz and Bones. Both characters worked at a Bay Area television station; Tom played cameraman Bones Howard and Dick played Ryan Fitzpatrick, an investigative reporter. The show was cancelled after five episodes.

In 1985 they guest-starred as themselves on Benson season 6, episode 17 "Solid Gold".

The pair starred in the Cinemax Comedy Experiment Rap Master Ronnie, a film version of Garry Trudeau and Elizabeth Swados' off-Broadway play. In 1989, they also appeared in the box office flop Speed Zone aka Cannonball Fever co-starring John Candy, Peter Boyle, and Donna Dixon.

In 1988, Tom and Dick reunited with CBS for a special celebrating the 20th anniversary of their variety show (though their show premiered in 1967, which made it their 21st anniversary). The brothers used the special to pay tribute to their network and also poke fun at it for cancelling them 19 years earlier. Several of their former writers, including Steve Martin, Rob Reiner, and Mason Williams appeared as guests, as did former series regulars such as Jennifer Warnes and Glen Campbell. The success of the special led to The Smothers Brothers Comedy Hour (1988–1989). This show began production during a 1988 Writers Guild of America strike as the WGA had agreed to settle with the show's producer and grant the show an exemption from the strike and allow writers to go back to work for the series.

1988 also marked the release of The Yo Yo Man Instructional Video, a VHS release in which Tom's non-speaking "Yo-Yo Man" character, who appeared as early as the 1960s, guides viewers through basic yo-yo moves. The video sold over 200,000 copies.

In 2004, they guest starred on Bonnie Hunt's Life With Bonnie.

We still disagree about everything. I mean, he's more conservative politically and also is a pragmatist. He's very pragmatic and wants everything to line up and put in a box. And I'm a little bit looser.

— Tommy Smothers (on his brother Dick),
from a 2006 interview.

The brothers have worked independently as well; Dick has appeared as an actor in films, including a rare dramatic role as a Nevada state senator in Martin Scorsese's Casino. Tom appeared in the 2005 made-for-television movie Once Upon a Mattress.

They appeared in the documentary The Aristocrats in 2005, and had separate cameos in the 2009 film The Informant! In December 2009, the duo guest starred in a 21st-season episode of The Simpsons that also featured Cooper, Peyton, and Eli Manning.

After more than 51 years of touring, the Smothers Brothers officially announced their retirement from touring during their final performance at the Orleans Hotel and Casino in Las Vegas, Nevada, on Sunday May 16, 2010. The affair was kept low key with some family members and friends in attendance.

On July 22, 2019, the Smothers Brothers made their first official appearance together in almost a decade at a charity event held at McCurdy's Comedy Theater in Sarasota, Florida. Though not a proper performance, they spoke about their careers and answered audience questions. The duo donated much of their archives and artifacts from their career to the National Comedy Center a week later and appeared at the Chautauqua Institution to discuss the 50th anniversary of the cancellation of The Smothers Brothers Comedy Hour.

The Smothers Brothers made several appearances in 2022. On the December 11, 2022, episode of CBS News Sunday Morning, the brothers announced that they would be going on tour in 2023. However, the tour was cancelled and Tom Smothers announced in July 2023 that he was diagnosed with stage 2 lung cancer. He died on December 26, 2023, at the age of 86.

Tom Smothers, along with his wife Marcy Carriker, operated the Remick Ridge Vineyards (Remick was the maiden name of Smothers' mother) in Sonoma County, California.

== Awards ==
In 2003, the brothers were awarded the George Carlin Freedom of Expression Award from the Video Software Dealers' Association. The award was in recognition of the brothers' "extraordinary comic gifts and their unfailing support of the First Amendment". In the same year, they both received Honorary Doctorate Degrees from San Jose State University. The Boston Comedy Festival presented a Lifetime Achievement Award to the brothers in 2008.

In September 2008, during the 60th Primetime Emmy Awards, Tommy Smothers, a lead writer of The Smothers Brothers Comedy Hour, was belatedly awarded a 1968 Emmy for Outstanding Writing in a Comedic Series. The award was presented to him by Steve Martin, one of the show's original writers. In 1968, Tommy Smothers had refused to let his name be on the list of writers nominated for the Emmy because he felt his name was too controversial, and thus when the writing staff won he was the only member not to receive the award.

The Smothers Brothers were given a star on the Hollywood Walk of Fame in 1989, and were inducted into the Television Academy Hall of Fame in 2010.

On June 18, 2022, the Smothers Brothers received the Johnny Carson Comedy Legend Award at the conclusion of the Great American Comedy Festival in Norfolk, Nebraska.

== Discography ==
=== Albums ===
- 1961: The Smothers Brothers at the Purple Onion
- 1962: The Two Sides of the Smothers Brothers
- 1963: Think Ethnic!
- 1963: Curb Your Tongue, Knave!
- 1964: It Must Have Been Something I Said!
- 1965: Tour de Farce: American History and Other Unrelated Subjects
- 1965: Aesop's Fables
- 1966: Mom Always Liked You Best!
- 1966: The Smothers Brothers Play It Straight
- 1967: Golden Hits of the Smothers Brothers, Vol. 2
- 1968: Smothers Brothers Comedy Hour
- 1988: Sibling Revelry: The Best of the Smothers Brothers

=== Singles ===
Year	Single (A-side, B-side) Both sides from same album except where indicated	US chart	Album
1962	"Down in the Valley" b/w "Where the Lilacs Grow" (from The Two Sides of The Smothers Brothers)		The Songs and Comedy of The Smothers Brothers at the Purple Onion
1962	"Fly Ezekiel" b/w "They Call the Wind Maria" (from The Songs and Comedy of The Smothers Brothers...)		Non-album track
1963	"Jenny Brown" b/w "You Go Thisaway" (Non-album track)	84	It Must Have Been Something I Said
1964	"Slithery Dee" / "The Civil War Song" b/w "The Coo-Coo" (Non-album track)		It Must Have Been Something I Said
1965	"The Three Song" b/w "The World I Used to Know" (by Dick Smothers)		Mom Always Liked You Best!
1965	"The Toy Song" b/w 'Little Sacka Sugar" (from Play It Straight)		Non-album track
1966	"Lark Day" b/w "The Write of Songs" (by Dick Smothers)		Play It Straight
1969	"The Christmas Bunny" (Two parts)		Non-album track
