= The Smothers Brothers at the Purple Onion =

Live album by Smothers Brothers
- Released: May 1, 1961
- Venue: Purple Onion, San Francisco, California; Tidelands Motor Inn, Houston, Texas
- Genre: comedy, folk music parody
- Label: Mercury

Smothers Brothers chronology
| The Smothers Brothers at the Purple Onion (1961) | The Two Sides of the Smothers Brothers (1962) |

The Smothers Brothers at the Purple Onion, released May 1, 1961, on Mercury Records, is the first album by the Smothers Brothers and established their reputation as folk music satirists. The Purple Onion was a celebrated comedy and music club in the North Beach area of San Francisco that also launched the careers of The Kingston Trio and Phyllis Diller, besides the Smothers Brothers. The album's full cover text is: The Songs and Comedy of the Smothers Brothers! Recorded at the Purple Onion, San Francisco, and is Mercury catalog number MG 20611 (monaural), and SR 60611 (stereo). It is sometimes referred to as Live at the Purple Onion.

Despite its title, the majority of Purple Onion was in fact recorded at the Tidelands Club in Houston, Texas, not at the Purple Onion. According to Dick Smothers (quoted in the duo's biography, Dangerously Funny), the performances recorded at the Purple Onion for the album were good but the tapes were marred by technical issues. As a result, the only part of the Purple Onion recording that made it onto the released album was the introduction. The rest of the record was sourced from the tapes of the duo's subsequent Tidelands Club shows. The brothers were grateful to the Purple Onion for giving them their first break, so the entire album was credited as having been recorded there.

== Track listing ==
All popular songs were rewritten for satiric purposes unless otherwise indicated. Phrases in quotations are from the liner notes.

1. "Pretoria" (4:26) (Original song credit: Josef Marais) – Made famous by The Weavers as "Marching to Pretoria," new lyrics by Tom (e.g., "You sleep with me, I'll sleep with you"). Also includes a discussion by Tom of marching songs, including "The March from The Bridge on the River Kwai" (to the tune of the "Colonel Bogey March"), whistled in the film due to the lyrics ("The words were dirty").
2. "Dance, Boatman, Dance" (5:55) (Tom & Dick Smothers)
3. "Down in the Valley" (4:21) (Tom & Dick Smothers) – a duet based on the Smothers' own arrangement.
4. "Tzena, Tzena, Tzena, Tzena" (2:11) (Original song credit: M. Parish (original lyric), I. Miron (Michrovsky) (music), & Julius Grossman) – Another song made popular by The Weavers.
5. "I Wish I Wuz in Peoria" (1:50) (Original song credit: H. Wood, B. Rose & M. Dixon)
6. "They Call the Wind Maria" (4:23) (Original song credit: Lerner & Loewe) – showtune from Paint Your Wagon.
7. "Jezebel" (5:42) (Original song credit: Wayne Shanklin) – The Frankie Laine hit with the woman renamed "Mary Ann Johnson"
8. "I Never Will Marry" (2:48) (Fred Brooks) – Performed as a traditional folk song, no satiric rewrite. Recorded again with a comic ending on Think Ethnic!.
9. "Tom Dooley" (4:47) (Tom & Dick Smothers) – based on the song made famous by The Kingston Trio, which Tommy claims the Trio stole from Dick ("Along with his luggage"). They do the "virgin edition," entitled "Tom Crudely."
