= Comedy album =

Audio recording of comedic material

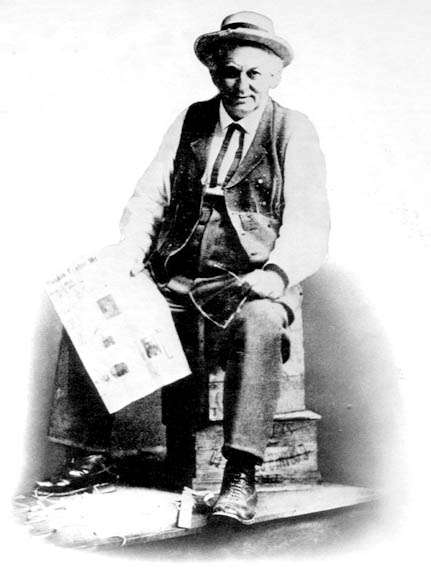
Cal Stewart released comedy records as early as 1898.

A comedy album is an audio recording of comedic material from a comedian or group of comedians, usually performed either live or in a studio. Comedy albums may feature skits, humorous songs, and/or live recording of stand-up comedy performances, but the most common type of comedy albums are stand up, and are often made in conjunction with a DVD with recorded video of a particular comedy show.

== Description ==
Some of the earliest albums recorded for popular commercial distribution were comedy albums. For example, various collections of humorous short stories recited by vaudeville comedian Cal Stewart were released by Edison Records as early as 1898. A number of record labels specialize in the comedy genre, including Aspecialthing Records, Comedy Central Records, Partee Records, Stand Up! Records, Stereolaffs and Celery Sound Records.

Comedy albums have won the Grammy Award for Best Spoken Word Album on several occasions, including America Again: Re-becoming The Greatness We Never Weren't, by Stephen Colbert (2014) and If You Ask Me (and of Course You Won't) by Betty White (2012). The first album to win this honor was The Best of the Stan Freberg Shows by Stan Freberg (1959), a variety album including comedy bits.

There is also a podcast that covers the history and influence of comedy albums, primarily on vinyl, titled Comedy on Vinyl, which also premiered a 50-year-old lost Bob Newhart track in 2015.

== History ==
Cal Stewart recorded monologues of jokes as the rustic "Uncle Josh" in the late 1890s. Stewart included some of the earliest recorded banana peel jokes on the record Uncle Josh in a Department Store in 1903. Another notable early example is Joe Hayman's 1913 Cohen on the Telephone, part of a series of routines about a Jewish immigrant besieged by technology. The Okeh Laughing Record, a record of a man and a woman simply laughing for three minutes, was a best-seller in 1922. Records of comedy songs became popular, with vaudeville and musical comedy stars such as Eddie Cantor and Fanny Brice releasing their own. However, when radio became popular with higher-fidelity FM broadcasting in the early 1930s, sales of records dropped. Spike Jones had some successes in the late 1940s. Comedy albums were held back by the technology of the time only allowing for short recordings, but when longer-duration LP records were introduced in 1948, it allowed artists such as Lord Buckley, Stan Freberg and Tom Lehrer to record material close to modern comedy albums.

The one album to possibly be considered the first modern comedy album is Mort Sahl's 1958 The Future Lies Ahead, which was a recording of his comedy routine in front of a live audience, organized by jazz record producer Norman Granz. Sahl's records sold well and he is said by Shelley Berman to have directly influenced him. Also the same year's The Best of the Stan Freberg Shows, a recording of collected material from Stan Freberg's comedy radio show The Stan Freberg Show, won the first 1959 Grammy Award for Best Spoken Word Album. Shelley Berman's own 1959 album Inside Shelley Berman is regarded as the first actual hit and was the first to win a Grammy in the subcategory Spoken Comedy of the Grammy Award for Best Comedy Album in 1960. Following it was a much bigger hit, The Button-Down Mind of Bob Newhart in early 1960. It hit number one on the Mono Action Albums chart (Billboard 200) for all recordings, including music. It stayed at the top for 14 weeks. It was only dethroned later the same year by the rushed out sequel, The Button-Down Mind Strikes Back!. The two albums occupied the top two spots for nearly 30 weeks, a record not surpassed until 1991 by Guns N’Roses.

The 1960s saw a comedy album phenomenon with the likes of Nichols and May, Smothers Brothers, Jonathan Winters, Dick Gregory, Carl Reiner, Mel Brooks, Tom Lehrer, Bill Cosby, Lenny Bruce, Redd Foxx, Allan Sherman and Vaughn Meader. In the 1970s, comedy albums developed a reputation for being targeted towards college students, being countercultural and not being allowed on TV. Notable artists were among others George Carlin, Cheech and Chong, Richard Pryor, Robert Klein, David Steinberg, Lily Tomlin, National Lampoon and Steve Martin.

The Firesign Theatre, an improvisational surreal radio comedy troupe formed on Los Angeles KPFK FM on November 6, 1966, released in January 1968 a tightly-scripted comedy album Waiting for the Electrician or Someone Like Him on Columbia Records. Side 1 consists of a trilogy of extended audio plays: "Temporarily Humboldt County" (9:14), which satirizes the Europeans' displacement of the indigenous peoples of the Americas; "W.C. Fields Forever" (7:39), which satirizes the 1960s hippie culture, and "Le Trente-Huit Cunegonde (Returned For Regrooving)" (7:19) which imagined a projected future in which the roles of the hippie counterculture and the Establishment culture have reversed roles. Side 2 (17:48) is the title track, a stream-of-consciousness play about an American tourist to an Eastern Bloc country, who ends up in prison and is rescued by the CIA. The Firesign Theatre produced fifteen albums designed for FM air play under two five-year recording contracts, and spawned an underground comedy cult. They won the Hugo Award for Best Dramatic Presentation by the World Science Fiction Society for two of their albums in 1971 and 1972. They continued recording on other labels as late as 2011, and three of their albums received nominations for Best Comedy Album Grammy in 1984, 1988, and 2001.

=== Party records ===
Party records were a genre of blue comedy albums in the 1950s, 60s, and 70s that were notable for their raunchy adult content and often featured African American comedians. Due to obscenity laws, party records were typically not displayed on record store shelves but were kept under the counter, sold by request, and promoted by word of mouth. Laff Records was a notable producer of party records. Comedians who became known due to party records include Richard Pryor, Redd Foxx, Lawanda Page, Moms Mabley, Rudy Ray Moore, Tina Dixon, Belle Barth, Skillet & Leroy, and Richard & Willie.
