= New York Friars Club =

Private club in New York City

The Friars Club
- Prae Omnia Fraternitas ("Brotherhood Above All")

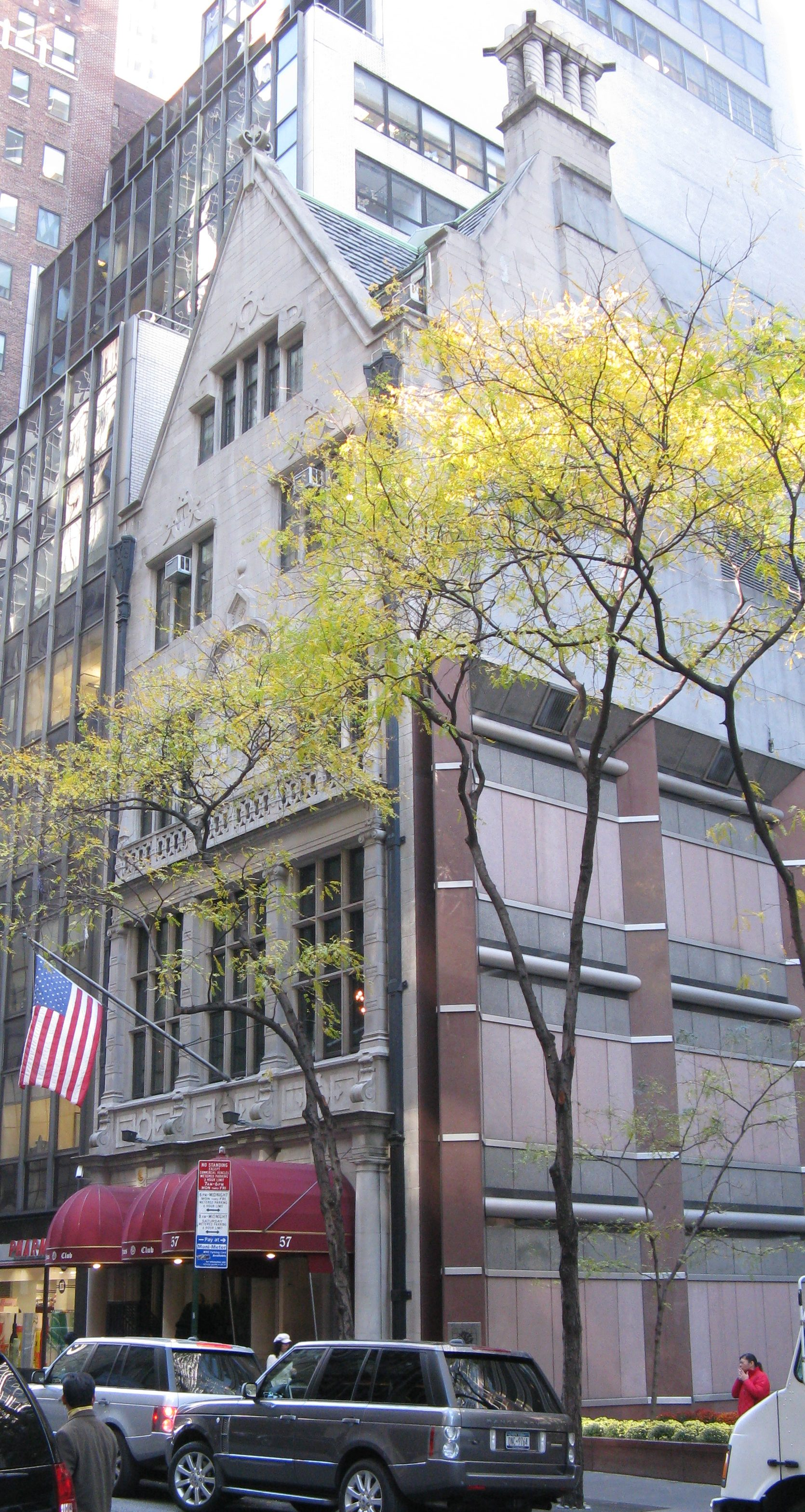
- The Monastery
- Formation: 1904; 122 years ago
- Type: Private social club
- Purpose: Fraternal organization
- Headquarters: 57 East 55th Street
- Location: Midtown Manhattan
- Coordinates: 40.760886°N 73.972551°W

The Friars Club was a private club in New York City, founded in 1904 and out of business by 2024. Famous for its risqué roasts, the club's membership was composed mostly of people who work in show business. The club was located at 57 East 55th Street, between Park Avenue and Madison Avenue, in the historic Martin Erdmann House, now known as the Monastery.

== History ==
=== Early years: 1904–1950 ===
The organization traces its roots to 1904, when representatives of the Broadway theaters working with New York publicists organized the Press Agents' Association to exchange lists of people who were fraudulently receiving complimentary passes to shows. The group regularly met at Browne's Chop House. Shortly thereafter it began its tribute dinners to theatrical celebrities, the first being Clyde Fitch. The impresario Oscar Hammerstein was roasted in 1908, the year in which the Friars moved into a clubhouse at 107 West 47th Street.

The first Friars Frolics were held in 1911, with Abbot George M. Cohan working with Will Rogers, Irving Berlin, who wrote "Alexander's Ragtime Band" for the event, and Victor Herbert. The money generated by the Frolics enabled them to purchase 106-108-110 West 48th Street. Under Abbot Cohan, they laid a cornerstone on the building in 1915. In 1924, Walter Donaldson wrote the music for "My Blue Heaven" one afternoon while waiting in the club for his turn at the billiard table.

Frederick F. Schrader is credited with suggesting "Friars" as the organization's name. Following the theme, their monthly newsletter was the Epistle.

In 1950, Sam Levenson and fellow comedian Joe E. Lewis were the first members of the New York Friars Club to be roasted. The club roasted a member every year since the inaugural roasting.

=== Clubhouse era (1957–2024) ===
The Friars Club moved into a permanent headquarters in 1957, in an English Renaissance mansion built for Speyer & Company investment banker Martin Erdmann by architects Alfredo S. G. Taylor and Levi in 1908. In 2013, the New York City Landmarks Preservation Commission proposed designating the Martin Erdmann House as a New York City landmark. The clubhouse was designated as a landmark in November 2016.

Friars Club roasts were first televised in the late 1960s, first as part of the Kraft Music Hall series. From 1998 to 2002, Comedy Central broadcast the roasts. Comedy Central then began organizing its own annual roasts.

On June 30, 1988, the club approved Liza Minnelli, after she applied for regular membership, and after the club’s board of governors changed its constitution to allow female members. The club’s board of governors also elected Barbara Sinatra, Lucille Ball, Carol Burnett, Eydie Gorme, Barbra Streisand, Elizabeth Taylor, Dinah Shore, Phyllis Diller and Martha Raye, to honorary membership.

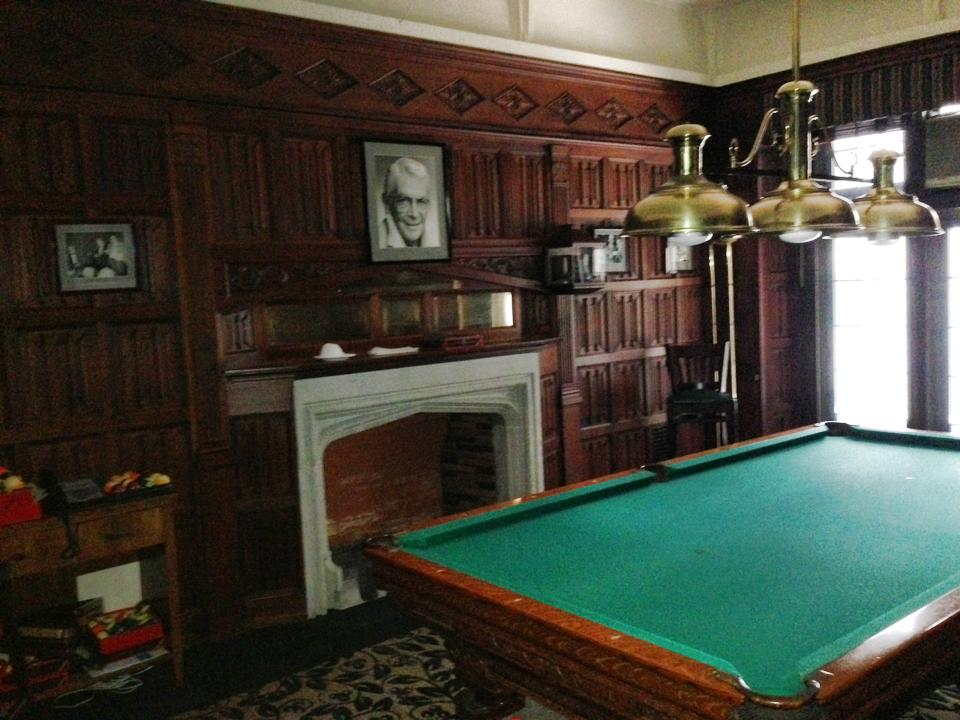
The William B. Williams Room, on the third floor of the Friars Club

==== Financial issues and sale of clubhouse ====
In 2021, the Friar's Club trademark lapsed, and was subsequently cancelled. In May 2023, it was reported that the club was facing foreclosure on the Martin Erdmann House due to a building flood, the COVID-19 pandemic, and financial irregularities. In October 2024, a foreclosure auction was scheduled for the building; the auction was later rescheduled for November. The Erdmann House was sold that December for $17.2 million. In April 2026, Extell Development Company paid $19 million for the Erdmann House.

== Organization ==
Officers of the club, as distinct from the Friars Foundation, are given monastic titles: In 2006, Larry King was the dean, Freddie Roman was the Dean Emeritus. Jerry Lewis was the Abbot, named during a roast in New York City. Previous abbots have included Alan King, Frank Sinatra, Ed Sullivan and George M. Cohan.

== Friars, Lambs, Players ==
In the 1960s, the Friars Club, the Lambs Club, and The Players were often confused. The columnist Earl Wilson put it this way in 1964: "Long ago a New Yorker asked the difference between the Lambs, Friars, and Players, since the membership was, at the time, predominantly from Broadway." It was left to "a wit believed to have been George S. Kaufman" to draw the distinction: "The Players are gentlemen trying to be actors, the Lambs are actors trying to be gentlemen, and the Friars are neither trying to be both."

== List of roasts ==
- 1950
  - Sam Levenson
- 1951
  - Phil Silvers
  - Harry Delf
  - Mel Allen
- 1952
  - Leo Durocher
  - Rocky Marciano
- 1953
  - Sophie Tucker
  - Milton Berle
  - Eddie Fisher
- 1954
  - Red Buttons
  - Martha Raye
  - Ed Sullivan, roastmaster Jack Carter
- 1955
  - Humphrey Bogart, roastmaster Red Buttons (recorded)
- 1956
  - Sammy Davis Jr.
- 1957
  - Joe E. Lewis
- 1958
  - Ed Sullivan
  - Red Buttons
  - Lucille Ball and Desi Arnaz
- 1959
  - Milton Berle, roastmaster Jack E. Leonard
  - Jimmy Cannon, roastmaster Jack E. Leonard
  - Jack E. Leonard
- 1960
  - George Burns, roastmaster George Jessel
- 1961
  - Gary Cooper, Testimonial Dinner hosted by Frank Sinatra and Dean Martin
  - Lucille Ball, roastmaster Johnny Carson
  - Alan King, roastmaster Jack E. Leonard
- 1962
  - Jan Murray
  - Johnny Carson
- 1963
  - Steve Lawrence
  - Jack Benny
- 1964
  - Jack Carter
  - Nat "King" Cole
  - Sammy Davis Jr.
- 1965
  - Marty Allen and Steve Rossi
  - Soupy Sales
- 1966
  - Al Kelly
  - John V. Lindsay
- 1967
  - Milton Berle
- 1968
  - Harry Belafonte
  - Don Rickles, roastmaster Jack E. Leonard
  - Johnny Carson, roastmaster Alan King and broadcast on Kraft Music Hall
- 1969
  - Barbra Streisand
  - Jack E. Leonard
  - Milton Berle, roastmaster Alan King and broadcast on Kraft Music Hall
- 1970
  - Don Rickles, roastmaster Johnny Carson and broadcast on Kraft Music Hall
  - David Frost
  - Jack Benny, roastmaster Johnny Carson and broadcast on Kraft Music Hall
- 1971
  - Jerry Lewis, roastmaster Johnny Carson and broadcast on Kraft Music Hall
  - Phil Silvers
  - Pat Henry
- 1972
  - Ed McMahon
- 1973
  - Henny Youngman
- 1974
  - George Raft
  - Milton Berle
- 1975
  - Redd Foxx
- 1976
  - Telly Savalas
- 1977
  - Joey Adams, roastmaster Milton Berle
  - Totie Fields
- 1978
  - Neil Simon, roastmaster Milton Berle
- 1979
  - Robert Merrill
  - Norm Crosby, roastmaster Milton Berle
- 1980
  - George Steinbrenner
- 1981
  - Jim Dale
- 1982
  - Dick Shawn, roastmaster Buddy Hackett
- 1983
  - Sid Caesar, roastmaster Buddy Hackett
  - Roger Grimsby
- 1984
  - Chuck Scarborough
  - Rolland Smith
- 1985
  - Phyllis Diller, roastmaster Buddy Hackett
- 1986
  - Jerry Lewis, roastmaster Buddy Hackett
- 1987
  - Rich Little, roastmaster Norm Crosby
  - Arnold Schwarzenegger, roastmaster George Carlin
- 1988
  - Ernest Borgnine
- 1989
  - Bruce Willis, roastmaster Milton Berle
- 1990
  - Chevy Chase, roastmaster Dan Aykroyd
- 1991
  - Richard Pryor, roastmaster Robin Williams
- 1992
  - Billy Crystal, roastmaster Rob Reiner
- 1993
  - Whoopi Goldberg, roastmaster Ted Danson
- 1994
  - Bob Newhart, roastmaster Don Rickles
- 1995
  - Steven Seagal, roastmaster Milton Berle
- 1996
  - Kelsey Grammer, roastmaster David Hyde Pierce
- 1997
  - Danny Aiello, roastmaster Joy Behar
- 1998
  - Drew Carey, roastmaster Ryan Stiles
- 1999
  - Jerry Stiller, roastmaster Jason Alexander
- 2000
  - Rob Reiner, roastmaster Michael McKean
- 2001
  - Hugh Hefner, roastmaster Jimmy Kimmel
- 2002
  - Chevy Chase, roastmaster Paul Shaffer
- 2003
  - The Smothers Brothers, roastmaster Susie Essman (replacing Richard Belzer)
- 2004
  - Donald Trump, roastmaster Regis Philbin
- 2005
  - Don King, roastmaster Donald Trump
- 2006
  - Jerry Lewis, roastmaster Richard Belzer
- 2007
  - Pat Cooper, roastmaster Lisa Lampanelli
- 2008
  - Matt Lauer, roastmaster Al Roker
- 2010
  - Quentin Tarantino, roastmaster Samuel L. Jackson
- 2012
  - Betty White, roastmaster Barbara Walters
- 2013
  - Jack Black, roastmaster Bob Saget
- 2014
  - Boomer Esiason, roastmaster Jeff Garlin
- 2015
  - Terry Bradshaw, roastmaster Joel McHale

== In popular media ==
In 1999, Cinemax aired Let Me In, I Hear Laughter: A Salute to the Friars Club directed by Dean Ward. It featured previously unseen footage of roasts and interviews with Friars such as Milton Berle, Buddy Hackett, Sid Caesar, Steve Allen, Henny Youngman, Jeffrey Ross, Larry King, Ed McMahon, and Phyllis Diller. It revealed that after comic Parkyakarkus (Harry Einstein) collapsed and died at a 1958 roast for Lucille Ball and Desi Arnaz, singer Tony Martin decided to sing "There's No Tomorrow" while Einstein was being carried off stage.

== Events ==
=== Stand-up comedy competition ===
In 2008, the Friars Club began a stand-up comedy competition, "So You Think You Can Roast!?". On October 24 of that year, the winner performed at the Friars Club roast of Matt Lauer.

=== Friars Club Comedy Film Festival ===
The inaugural Friars Club Comedy Film Festival was held in September 2009, opening with the American premiere of the Coen Brothers' Academy Award–nominated film, A Serious Man. Other festival highlights include screenings of Christopher Morris’s Four Lions, and the Oscar-winning short God of Love. In 2011, Jerry Lewis and Russel Simmons presented a comedy achievement award to Brett Ratner.

In 2012, the festival hosted America Ferrera and David Cross, stars of the opening film It's a Disaster. According to The Wall Street Journal, "The festival has quietly become one of the city's most sharply curated cinema gatherings. It takes the funny business seriously."

== See also ==
- Friars Club of California, founded in 1947 as a spinoff
- List of New York City Designated Landmarks in Manhattan from 14th to 59th Streets
