= Dean Ward =

Dean Ward may refer to:

- Dean Ward (bobsleigh), British bobsledder
- Dean Ward (screenwriter), American screenwriter and filmmaker
