= Lucille La Verne =

American actress (1872–1945)

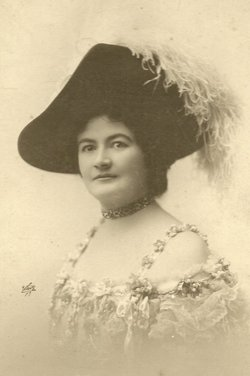
- La Verne in 1915
- Born: Lucille La Verne Mitchum; November 7, 1872; Nashville, Tennessee, U.S.
- Died: March 4, 1945 (aged 72); Culver City, California, U.S.
- Resting place: Inglewood Park Cemetery, U.S.
- Other names: Lucille LaVerne, Lucille La Varney, Lucille Lavarney
- Occupation: Actress
- Years active: 1888–1937
- Notable work: Original voice of Queen Grimhilde in Disney's Snow White and the Seven Dwarfs (1937)

Lucille La Verne Mitchum (November 7, 1872 – March 4, 1945) was an American actress known for her appearances in early sound films, as well as for her triumphs on the American stage. She is most widely remembered to modern audiences as the voice of the first Disney villain, the Evil Queen in Snow White and the Seven Dwarfs (1937), Walt Disney's first full-length animated feature film, serving as her final film role.

== Biography ==
Lucille La Verne Mitchum was born near Nashville, Tennessee, on November 7, 1872 (although some sources say 1869). She began her career as a child in local summer stock. As a teenager, she performed in small touring theater troupes. When she was 14, she played both Juliet and Lady Macbeth back to back. Her ability to play almost any part quickly caught the attention of more prolific companies, and she made her Broadway debut in 1888. She then became a leading lady with some of the best stock companies in America, scoring triumphs in San Francisco, Boston, and other cities. She eventually ran her own successful stock company.

On the New York stage, she was known for her range and versatility. Among her hits on Broadway were principal roles in Uncle Tom's Cabin, Seven Days and Way Down East. She was also known for her blackface roles. Her biggest stage triumph came in 1923 when she created the role of Widow Caggle in the hit play Sun Up. With her Broadway run, US tour, and European tour, La Verne gave over 3,000 performances. She also worked on Broadway as a playwright and director. In the late 1920s, a Broadway theater was named for her for a short period of time.

In 1934, La Verne experienced a life-threatening medical emergency and needed the muscles along her rib cage to be reconstructed by Los Angeles surgeons, from which she recovered.

She made her motion picture debut in 1915 in the movie Over Night directed by James Young. She also performed small parts in the movies Polly of the Circus, directed by Charles Thomas Horan and Edwin L. Hollywood, and Orphans of the Storm, directed by D. W. Griffith. Her best known part is that of the voice of the Evil Queen, and her alter ego of the old witch from Disney's 1937 animated film Snow White and the Seven Dwarfs which was her final film performance.

== Death ==
Lucille La Verne died at the age of 72 in Culver City, California, on March 4, 1945, after suffering from lung cancer. She was interred at Inglewood Park Cemetery. Her grave remained unmarked for seven decades until a GoFundMe was set up in 2020.

== Filmography ==
Year	Title	Role	Notes
1915	Over Night	Minor Role	
1916	Sweet Kitty Bellairs	Lady Maria	Credited as "Lucille Lavarney"
1916	The Thousand-Dollar Husband	Mme. Batavia	Credited as "Lucille La Varney"
1917	Polly of the Circus	Mandy	
1918	The Life Mask	Sarah Harden	
1918	Tempered Steel	Old Mammy	
1919	The Praise Agent	Mrs. Eubanks	
1921	Orphans of the Storm	Mother Frochard	
1923	The White Rose	'Auntie' Easter	Credited as "Lucille Laverne"
1923	Zaza	Aunt Rosa	
1923	Among the Missing	The Mother	
1924	America	Refugee Mother	
1924	His Darker Self	Aunt Lucy	
1925	Sun-Up	Mother	
1928	The Last Moment	Innkeeper	
1930	Abraham Lincoln	Mid-wife	
1930	Sinners' Holiday	Mrs. Delano	Credited as "Lucille LaVerne"
1930	Du Barry, Woman of Passion	Minor Role	Voice; uncredited
1930	The Comeback	Unknown	Short film
1931	Little Caesar	Ma Magdalena	Uncredited
1931	The Great Meadow	Elvira Jarvis	
1931	An American Tragedy	Mrs. Asa Griffiths	
1931	24 Hours	Mrs. Dacklehorse	
1931	The Unholy Garden	Lucie Villars	
1932	Union Depot	Lady with pipe	Uncredited
1932	She Wanted a Millionaire	Mother Norton	
1932	Alias the Doctor	Martha Brenner, Karl's foster mother	Credited as "Lucille LaVerne"
1932	While Paris Sleeps	Mme. Golden Bonnet	
1932	Hearts of Humanity	Mrs. Sneider	
1932	Breach of Promise	Mrs. Flynn	
1932	A Strange Adventure	Miss Sheen	
1932	Wild Horse Mesa	Ma [The General] Melberne	
1933	Pilgrimage	Mrs. Kelly Hatfield	
1933	The Last Trail	Mrs. Wilson	
1934	Beloved	Mrs. Briggs	
1934	School for Girls	Miss Keeble	
1934	Kentucky Kernels	Aunt Hannah	Credited as "Lucille LaVerne"
1934	The Mighty Barnum	Joice Heth	
1935	A Tale of Two Cities	The Vengeance	Credited as "Lucille LaVerne"
1936	Hearts of Humanity	Minor Role	
1936	Ellis Island	Radio	Voice; uncredited
1937	Snow White and the Seven Dwarfs	Queen Grimhilde	Voice; uncredited; final film role
