= Thelma Leeds =

American actress (1910–2006)

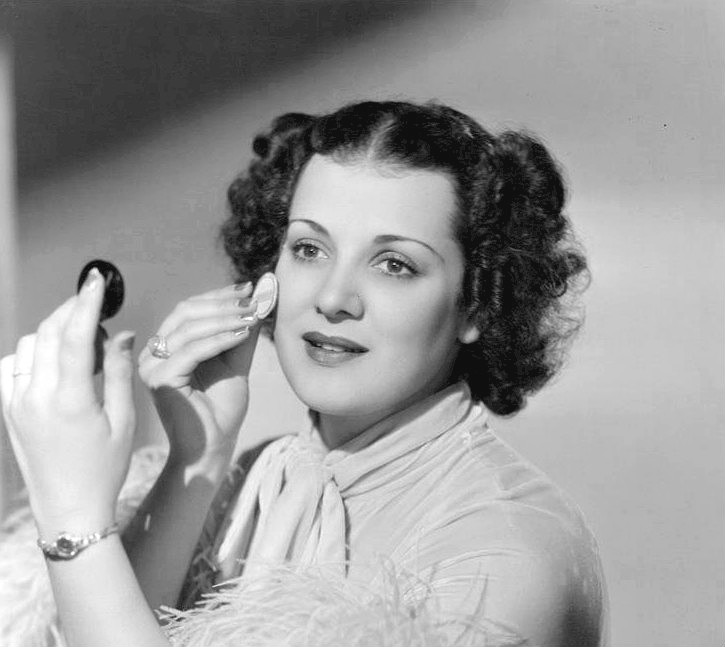
- Thelma Leeds in 1937
- Born: Thelma Goodman; December 18, 1910; New York City, U.S.
- Died: May 27, 2006 (aged 95); Beverly Hills, California, U.S.
- Occupation: Actress
- Years active: 1922–1959
- Spouse(s): Harry "Parkyakarkus" Einstein (m. 1937; died 1958); Irving “Bernie” Bernstein (m. 1960; died 1983)
- Children: 3, including Albert Brooks and Bob Einstein

Thelma Leeds (née Goodman; December 18, 1910 – May 27, 2006) was an American actress.

== Life and career ==
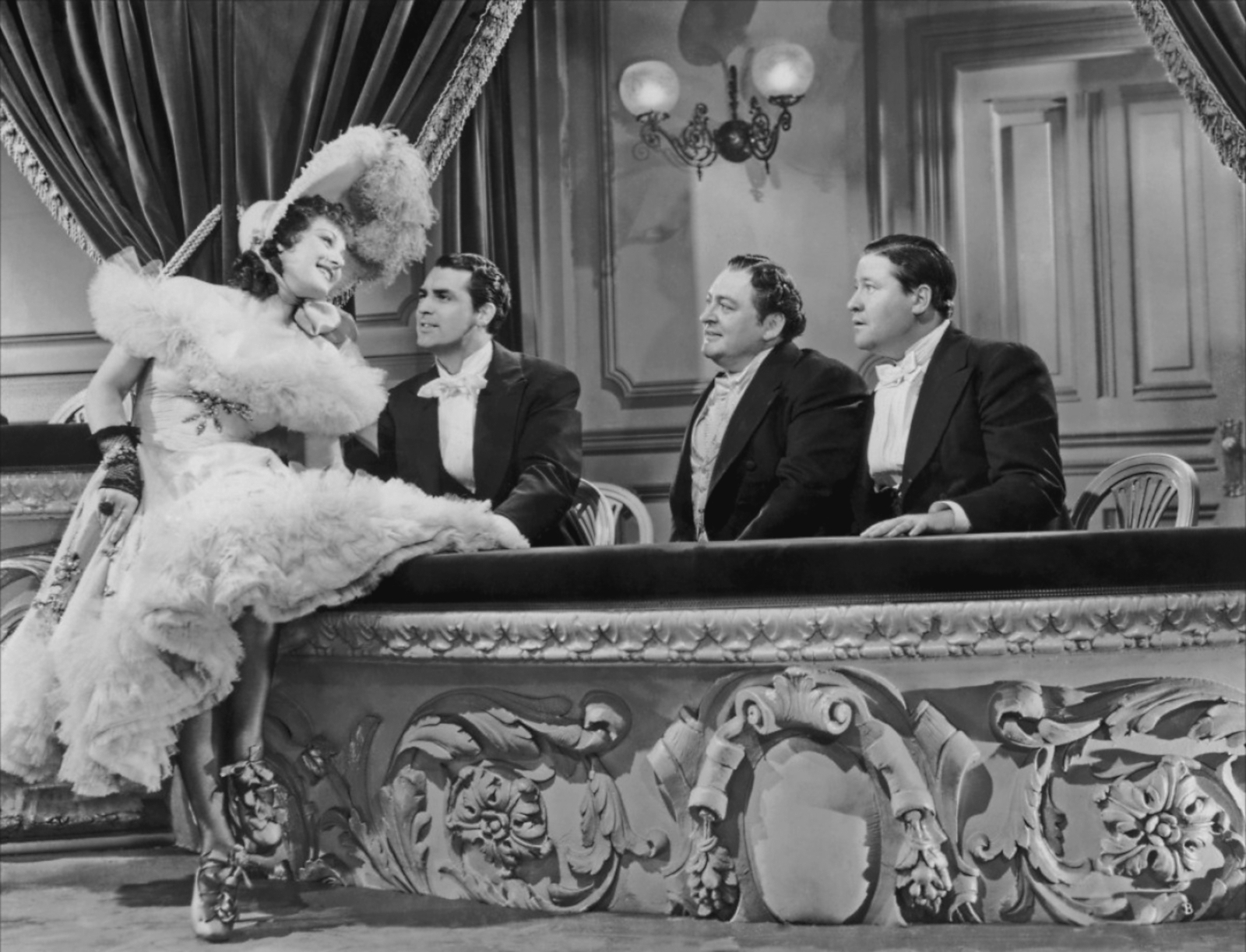
Leeds and Cary Grant in The Toast of New York, 1937

Leeds was born Thelma Goodman in New York City, to Katie and Joseph Goodman, Russian-Jewish immigrants. She was the mother of actor/director Albert Brooks, Bob Einstein (TV's "Super Dave Osborne"), and Clifford Einstein, chairman of Dailey & Associates Advertising in West Hollywood, California and chairman of the Museum of Contemporary Art, Los Angeles. In the early 1930s, Leeds sang light opera on the radio. She also performed in New York City nightclubs as Thelma Goodman, her birth name. One night in the mid-1930s a RKO talent scout caught her nightclub act. The studio signed her to a contract and gave her the name Thelma Leeds. She had an uncredited role in the 1936 Fred Astaire/Ginger Rogers musical Follow the Fleet. She later had supporting roles in The Toast of New York (1937) and New Faces of 1937.

She met her husband Harry "Parkyakarkus" Einstein, a dialect comedian, while filming New Faces of 1937. Leeds retired from show business after marrying Einstein in 1937. Two years after Einstein's death in 1958, she married Irving "Bernie" Bernstein; he died in 1983. In 1981, Leeds played Brooks' mother in Modern Romance. She reportedly was the inspiration for Brooks' 1996 comedy Mother, which starred Debbie Reynolds. Clifford Einstein told the Los Angeles Times:

I think mom was bugged that she couldn't play (Brooks' mother in Mother) ... She loved to laugh at herself and loved the portrayal of Mother that, while not her story, was certainly loosely based on her: the kind of mother that loves to control everything.

== Death ==
Leeds died at her home in Beverly Hills, California of natural causes, aged 95. She was entombed at Home of Peace Cemetery.
