= New Faces of 1937 =

1937 film by Leigh Jason

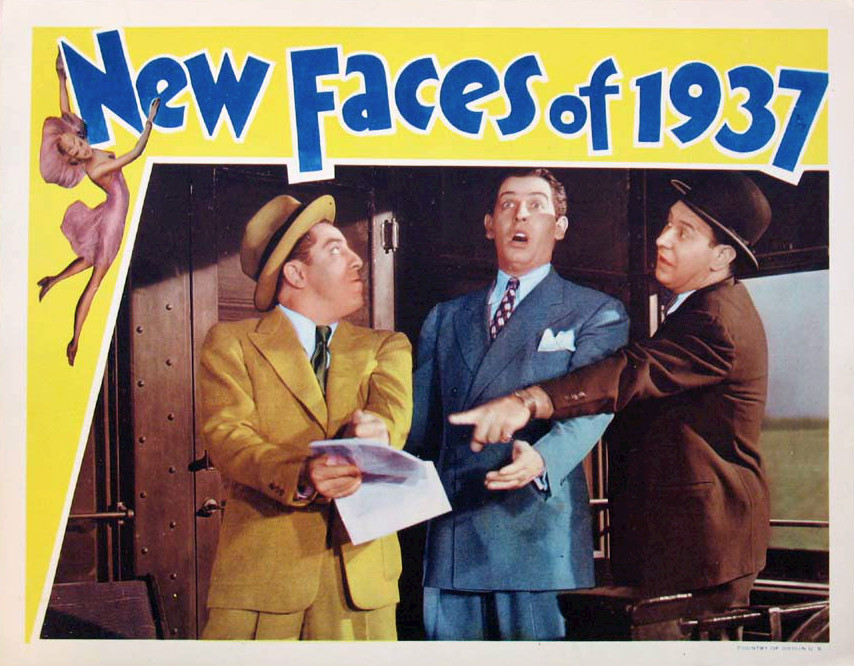
- Lobby card to New Faces of 1937
- Directed by: Leigh Jason; James Anderson (assistant)
- Written by: Story: George Bradshaw ("Shoestring"); Sketch: David Freedman ("A Day at the Brokers"); Adaptation: Harold Kussell; Harry Clork; Howard J. Green; Screenplay: Nat Perrin; Philip G. Epstein; Irv S. Brecher
- Produced by: Edward Small
- Starring: Joe Penner; Milton Berle; Parkyakarkus; Harriet Hilliard; William Brady; Jerome Cowan; Thelma Leeds
- Cinematography: J. Roy Hunt
- Edited by: George Crone
- Music by: Roy Webb
- Production company: Edward Small Productions for RKO Radio Pictures
- Distributed by: RKO Radio Pictures (1937) (USA) (theatrical); C&C Television Corporation (1955) (USA) (TV); RKO Home Video (USA) (video) (laserdisc)
- Release date: July 2, 1937
- Running time: 100 minutes
- Country: United States
- Language: English
- Budget: $728,000
- Box office: $775,000

New Faces of 1937 is a 1937 American musical film directed by Leigh Jason and starring Joe Penner, Milton Berle and Harriet Hilliard. Its plot is similar to The Producers (1968). Intended as the first film of an annual RKO Pictures revue series, poor reception ended plans for future productions.

== Plot ==
A crooked theatrical producer deliberately sets about creating an unsuccessful show after selling more than 100% of it to investors.

== Cast ==
- Joe Penner as Seymore Seymore, aspiring actor
- Milton Berle as Wallington 'Wally' Wedge
- Parkyakarkus as Parky
- Harriet Hilliard as Patricia 'Pat' Harrington
- William Brady as James 'Jimmy' Thompson
- Jerome Cowan as Robert Hunt
- Thelma Leeds as Elaine Dorset
- Lorraine Krueger as Suzy
- Tommy Mack as Judge Hugo Straight, Conductor
- Bert Gordon as Count Mischa Moody
- Patricia Wilder as Pat, Hunt's Secretary
- Richard Lane as Harry Barnes, Broker
- Dudley Clements as Plunkett, Stage Manager
- William Corson as Assistant Stage Manager
- George Rosener as Peter, Stage Doorman
- Dewey Robinson as Joe Guzzola
- Consuelo Harris as Dancer
- Harry C. Bradley as Count Moody's Secretary

== Production ==
An alternate title for this film, which was in production from late March to mid-May 1937, had been listed as Young People. Singer Rene Stone, who appears in the film, was discovered by Edward Small singing while cleaning dishes in a Manhattan restaurant.

== Soundtrack ==
- "New Faces"

(1937)
Music and Lyrics by Charles Henderson
Played during the opening credits
Sung and danced by showgirls (including The Brian Sisters) and showboys to open the final show
Danced by Ann Miller
Sung by Harriet Hilliard and showgirls

- "The Widow in Lace"

(1937)
Music by Harold Spina
Lyrics by Walter Bullock
Sung by Thelma Leeds and showgirls at rehearsal
Played and danced by unidentified children, probably The Loria Brothers

- "Our Penthouse on Third Avenue"

(1937)
Music by Sammy Fain
Lyrics by Lew Brown
Played on piano by Harriet Hilliard and sung by her and William Brady

- "It Goes to Your Feet"

(1937)
Music by Sammy Fain
Lyrics by Lew Brown
Played and sung by Eddie Rio and Brothers
Danced by Lowe, Hite and Stanley act, with Lorraine Krueger

- "If I Didn't Have You"

(1937)
Music by Sammy Fain
Lyrics by Lew Brown
Sung by Harriet Hilliard and William Brady

- "Love Is Never Out of Season"

(1937)
Music by Sammy Fain
Lyrics by Lew Brown
Sung by William Brady and danced by Harriet Hilliard and male chorus

- "When the Berry Blossoms Bloom"

(1937)
Written by Joe Penner and Hal Raynor
Sung and danced by Joe Penner in the show

- "Peckin'"

(1936)
Music and Lyrics by Ben Pollack and Harry James
Additional lyrics by Eddie Cherkose (1937)
Sung and danced by The Three Chocolateers, The Four Playboys and chorus in the big finale in the show

- "Bridal Chorus (Here Comes the Bride)"

(uncredited)
from "Lohengrin"
Music by Richard Wagner
Swing version in the song "Peckin'"

- "The Wedding March"

(uncredited)
from "A Midsummer Night's Dream, Op.61"
Music by Felix Mendelssohn-Bartholdy
Swing version in the song "Peckin'"

== Reception ==
The film recorded a loss of $258,000. Reviews were mixed.

The film was intended to be the first in a series of musical revues designed to introduce new RKO talent, but this did not eventuate. Film writers Richard B. Jewell and Vernon Harbin wrote that: "Containing not a single memorable musical number or inspired comedy routine, this tedious mish-mash caused the studio embarrassment a-plenty. Theatre owners and audiences displayed such hostility towards the Edward Small production in general, and Penner and Parkyakaras in particular, that RKO cancelled plans to make a New Faces of 1938."

Variety gave the film a negative review, and recommended that it be cut by twenty minutes as it "will bog down." The reviewer commented, "New Faces of 1937 is not a good picture ... It's a hodgepodge of vaudeville, nightclub and radio talent."
