= Sweethearts of the U.S.A. =

1944 film

- Directed by: Lewis D. Collins
- Written by: Sherman L. Lowe; Arthur St. Claire; Mary Sheldon
- Produced by: Lester Cutler; Max Kravetz; George M. Merrick
- Starring: Una Merkel; Harry Parke; Donald Novis
- Cinematography: Ira H. Morgan
- Edited by: George M. Merrick
- Music by: Rudy Schrager
- Production company: Monogram Pictures
- Distributed by: Monogram Pictures
- Release date: March 7, 1944
- Running time: 63 minutes
- Country: United States
- Language: English

Sweethearts of the U.S.A. is a 1944 American musical comedy film directed by Lewis D. Collins and starring Una Merkel, Harry Parke, and Donald Novis. In Britain, it was released under the alternative title of Sweethearts on Parade.

The film's sets were designed by art director Paul Palmentola.

== Cast ==
- Una Merkel as Patsy Wilkins
- Harry Parke as Parky
- Donald Novis as Don Clark
- Lillian Cornell as Helen Grant
- Teala Loring as Loretta Carver
- Joel Friend as Bill Craige
- Cobina Wright Sr. as Mrs. Josephine Carver
- Georgann Smith as Juanita Hogan - Specialty Dancer
- Marion Martin as Ghost of Josephine
- Ralph Sanford as Gilhooley
- Vince Barnett as Clipper - Third Robber
- Joe Devlin as Boss - First Robber
- Forrest Taylor as Deacon - Second Robber
- Jack Baxley as Chief of Police Sly Slocum
- Joe Kirk as Ghost of Napoleon
- Edmund Cobb as Ghost of Captain Kidd
- Dorothy Gulliver as Defense Plant Worker
- Dorothy Bradshaw as Defense Plant Worker
- Charles Williams as Mr. Pike
- Phil Ohman as Himself
- Henry King's Orchestra as themselves
- Jan Garber's Orchestra as themselves
