= Strike Me Pink (film) =

1936 film by Norman Taurog

- 1936 Theatrical Poster
- Directed by: Norman Taurog
- Written by: Clarence Budington Kelland; Walter DeLeon; Francis Martin; Frank Butler; Philip Rapp
- Produced by: Samuel Goldwyn
- Starring: Eddie Cantor; Ethel Merman; Sally Eilers; Parkyakarkus; William Frawley
- Cinematography: Merritt B. Gerstad
- Edited by: Sherman Todd
- Music by: Harold Arlen; Alfred Newman
- Production company: Samuel Goldwyn Productions
- Distributed by: United Artists
- Release date: January 16, 1936
- Running time: 100 minutes
- Country: United States
- Language: English
- Box office: $1.7 million

Strike Me Pink is a 1936 American musical comedy film directed by Norman Taurog, starring Eddie Cantor and Ethel Merman, and produced by Samuel Goldwyn.

Cantor plays a nebbishy employee of an amusement park, forced to assert himself against a gang of slot-machine racketeers. The climax involves a wild chase over a roller coaster and in a hot-air balloon, filmed at The Pike in Long Beach, California. The film's sets were designed by the art director Richard Day.

The film was Eddie Cantor's sixth of six films for Goldwyn, all produced and released within seven years. The story derives from the novel Dreamland by the once-popular writer Clarence Budington Kelland, reworked as a 1933 stage musical comedy by Ray Henderson for Jimmy Durante.

== Cast ==
- Eddie Cantor as Eddie Pink
- Ethel Merman as Joyce Lennox
- Sally Eilers as Claribel Higg
- Parkyakarkus as Parkyakarkus
- William Frawley as Mr. Copple
- Helene Lowell as Hattie 'Ma' Carson
- Gordon Jones as Butch Carson
- Brian Donlevy as Vance
- Jack LaRue as Mr. Thrust
- Sunnie O'Dea as Sunnie
- Rita Rio as Mademoiselle Fifi
- Edward Brophy as Killer
- Sidney H. Fields as Chorley Lennox
- Don Brodie as Mr. Marsh
- Charles McAvoy as Mr. Selby
- the Goldwyn Girls as Themselves

== Critical reception ==
Frank Nugent of The New York Times wrote that as "Eddie Cantor Week" was beginning at Radio City Music Hall, Cantor’s latest film "appears to lack some of his customary expansiveness and much of the comic invention that has made (him) one of the screen's most likable funny men." Nugent continued that he suspected the fault was in the adaptation. "When Clarence Budington Kelland wrote Dreamland, which is just a shorter word for Strike Me Pink, it was well established that he was hand-tailoring it to the measurements of Harold Lloyd. In altering it to fit Mr. Cantor and a musical show, Mr. Goldwyn's four script writers resorted freely to padding and shears. The marks of travail are evident and the film's transition from straight comedy to chorus interlude frequently is hard to take."

Variety did not fully agree with Nugent, and wrote, "while 'Pink' would have provided swell opportunities for Lloyd, it at the same time suits Cantor well." Although it acknowledged the quality of the singing, and the clever staging of the dance numbers, it commented that "it’s the kind of comedy yarn which could have been done without the benefit of singing and dancing." Eddie Cantor’s performance was rated as "aces all the way", Sally Eilers "renders a steady performance" and in discussing the comedic performance of Parkyakarkas, Variety commented, "the audience will want to see more of this fellow."

Writing for The Spectator in 1936, Graham Greene gave the film a good review, pointing out that in addition to the comedic value, the actorly qualities of Eddie Cantor made the film a true success. Although Greene suggests that Cantor is not perhaps quite at the level of Charlie Chaplin, he describes the scene between Pink and the gunman is "superb", and suggests that "one will have to wait a very long time for any film funnier than this one".
