= The Thousand-Dollar Husband =

1916 film by James Young

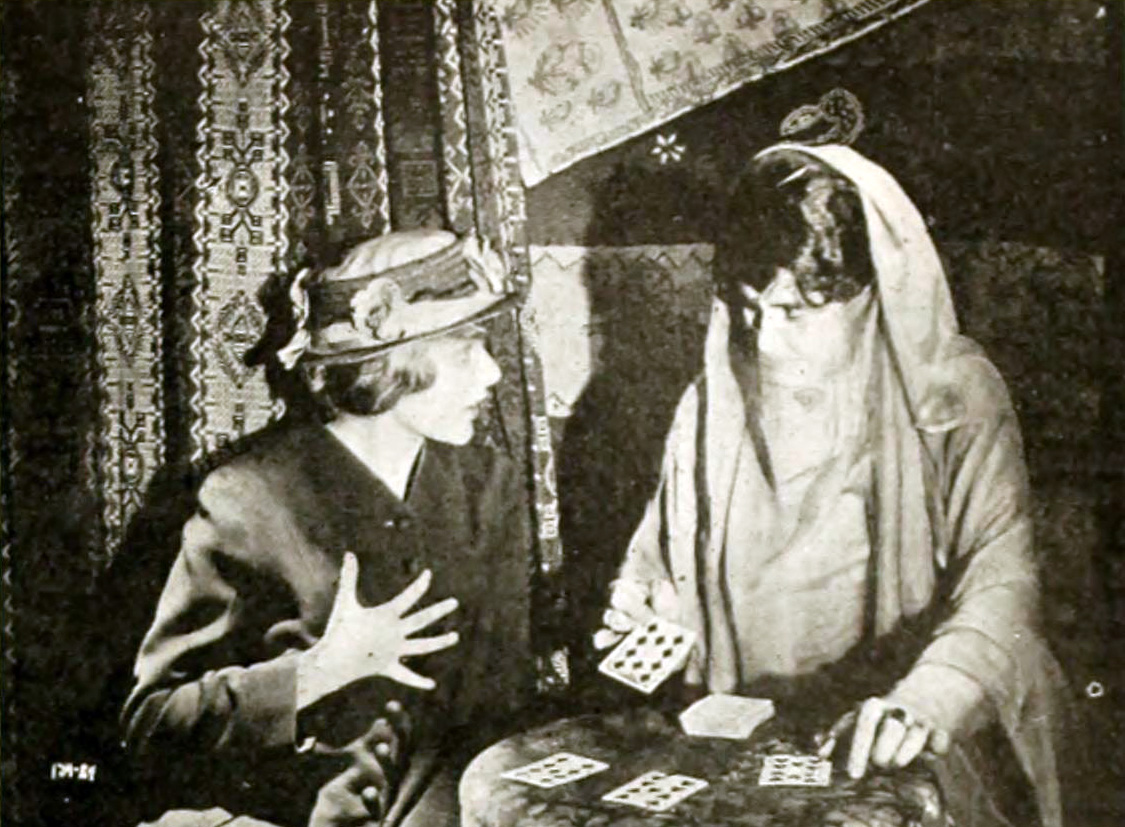
- Film still
- Directed by: James Young
- Screenplay by: James Young
- Story by: Margaret Turnbull
- Produced by: Jesse L. Lasky
- Starring: Blanche Sweet; Theodore Roberts; Tom Forman; James Neill; Horace B. Carpenter; Lucille La Verne
- Cinematography: Paul P. Perry
- Production company: Jesse L. Lasky Feature Play Company
- Distributed by: Paramount Pictures
- Release date: May 28, 1916
- Running time: 5 reels
- Country: United States
- Language: Silent (English intertitles)

The Thousand-Dollar Husband is a lost 1916 American silent drama film written and directed by James Young and starring Blanche Sweet, Theodore Roberts, Tom Forman, James Neill, Horace B. Carpenter, and Lucille La Verne. The film was released on May 28, 1916, by Paramount Pictures.

== Cast ==
- Blanche Sweet as Olga Nelson
- Theodore Roberts as Uncle Sven Johnson
- Tom Forman as Douglas Gordon
- James Neill as Stephen Gordon
- Horace B. Carpenter as Lawyer Judson
- Lucille La Verne as Mme. Batavia
- E.L. Delaney as Jack Hardy
- Camille Astor as Maggie, Olga's Friend
- Jane Wolfe

== Preservation ==
With no holdings located in archives, The Thousand Dollar Husband is considered a lost film.
