= George Rosener =

American actor and writer (1884–1945)

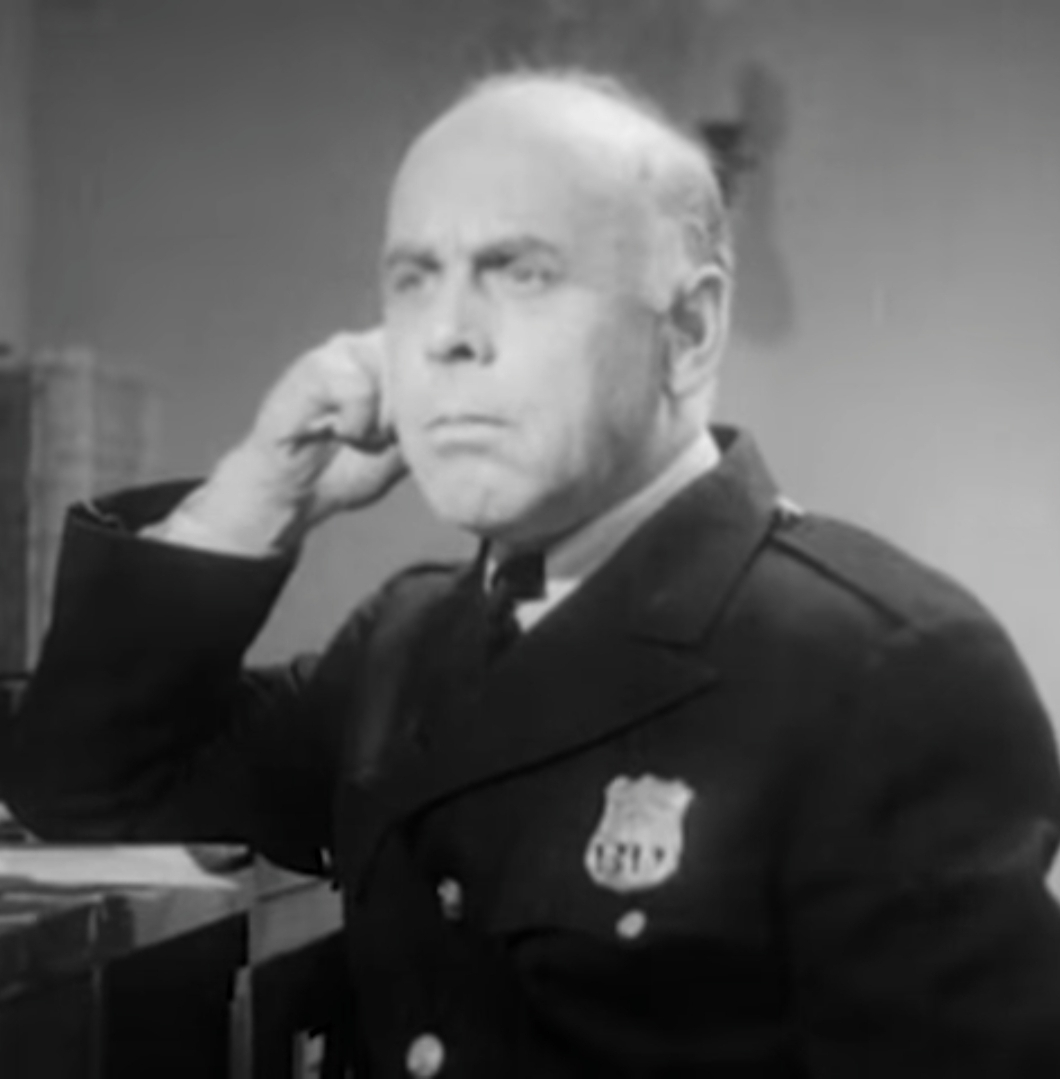
- Rosener in City of Missing Girls (1941)
- Born: George Michael Rosener; May 26, 1884; Brooklyn, New York City, U.S.
- Died: March 29, 1945 (aged 60); Los Angeles, California, U.S.
- Occupations: Actor; writer
- Years active: 1930–1941
- Known for: Work with Frank Buck
- Spouse: Adele Oswald Rosener
- Children: George M. Rosener (1926–1988)

George Michael Rosener (May 26, 1884 – March 29, 1945) was an American film actor and writer. He also wrote and acted in the Frank Buck serial Jungle Menace.

== Career ==
Rosener began his acting career at age 19 as a circus clown, followed by stints in tent and medicine shows, vaudeville, and stock companies. He was a playwright whose 1927 play Speakeasy (written with Edward Knoblock) was adapted for film in 1929. Rosener acted in or directed more than 200 plays, including My Maryland. He was on the news staff of the New York World.

George Rosener as Otto the butler in Doctor X (1932)

He worked for the Shubert family, operators of the Broadway theater district, for more than seven years as an actor, director, and writer. He also acted in 38 films and wrote 14 more, including Doctor X, Union Depot, The Secret of Treasure Island, City of Missing Girls, The Mysterious Pilot, Alias the Doctor, The Great Adventures of Wild Bill Hickok, Sinners' Holiday, New Faces of 1937, House of Secrets, The Carson City Kid, Abe Lincoln in Illinois, and The Great Commandment.

=== Work with Frank Buck ===
In 1937, Rosener wrote and acted in the Frank Buck serial Jungle Menace.

== Final years ==
Rosener's last film credit was in 1941. His wife, Adele, died in June 1942. George Rosener died three years later.

== Partial filmography ==
- Sinners' Holiday (1930, dialogue)
- The Doorway to Hell (1930, screenplay) - Slick (uncredited)
- She Got What She Wanted (1930, screenplay)
- Union Depot (1932) - Dr. Bernardi
- Alias the Doctor (1932) - Dr. Franz von Bergman
- Doctor X (1932) - Otto
- 70,000 Witnesses (1932) - Ortello
- Madison Square Garden (1932) - Crooked Fight Manager (uncredited)
- The Devil Is Driving (1932) - The Dummy
- The Circus Queen Murder (1933) - John T. Rainey
- Goodbye Love (1933, screenplay)
- The Test (1935) - Trapper (uncredited)
- House of Secrets (1936) - Hector Munson
- The Case of the Black Cat (1936) - Charles Ashton
- Ellis Island (1936) - Uncle Ted Kedrich
- Park Avenue Logger (1937) - Matt O'Shea
- New Faces of 1937 (1937) - Doorman
- Super-Sleuth (1937) - Policeman
- The Big Shot (1937) - Phillips - the Accountant (uncredited)
- Jungle Menace (1937, Serial) - The Professor
- The Mysterious Pilot (1937, Serial) - Fritz [Chs.3-5,9,14-15]
- Sh! The Octopus (1937) - Captain Hook
- The Secret of Treasure Island (1938, Serial) - Capt. Samuel Cuttle
- The Great Adventures of Wild Bill Hickok (1938, screenplay)
- Flying G-Men (1939, Serial) - Hopkins (uncredited)
- Confessions of a Nazi Spy (1939) - Klauber
- They All Come Out (1939) - Barney (uncredited)
- In Name Only (1939) - Dr. Hastings at Hotel (uncredited)
- 5th Ave Girl (1939) - Hobo in Park (uncredited)
- The Great Commandment (1939) - Merchant
- Hitler – Beast of Berlin (1939) - Wunderlich
- Three Sons (1939) - Man Taking Cigarette Butt (uncredited)
- Joe and Ethel Turp Call on the President (1939) - Mr. Belknap (uncredited)
- Abe Lincoln in Illinois (1940) - Dr. Chandler
- Florian (1940) - Riding School Inspector (uncredited)
- The Carson City Kid (1940) - Judge Tucker
- Colorado (1940) - Secret Service Official (uncredited)
- Victory (1940) - Dutch Clerk (uncredited)
- So Ends Our Night (1941) - Custom Guard (uncredited)
- Arkansas Judge (1941) - Mr. Beaudry
- I'll Sell My Life (1941, screenplay)
- City of Missing Girls (1941, screenplay) - Officer Dugan
- In Old Cheyenne (1941) - Sam Drummond
- Sheriff of Tombstone (1941) - Official (uncredited) (final film role)
