= Browne's Chop House =

Restaurant in 19th-century New York City

Coordinates: 40°45′15″N 73°59′13″W

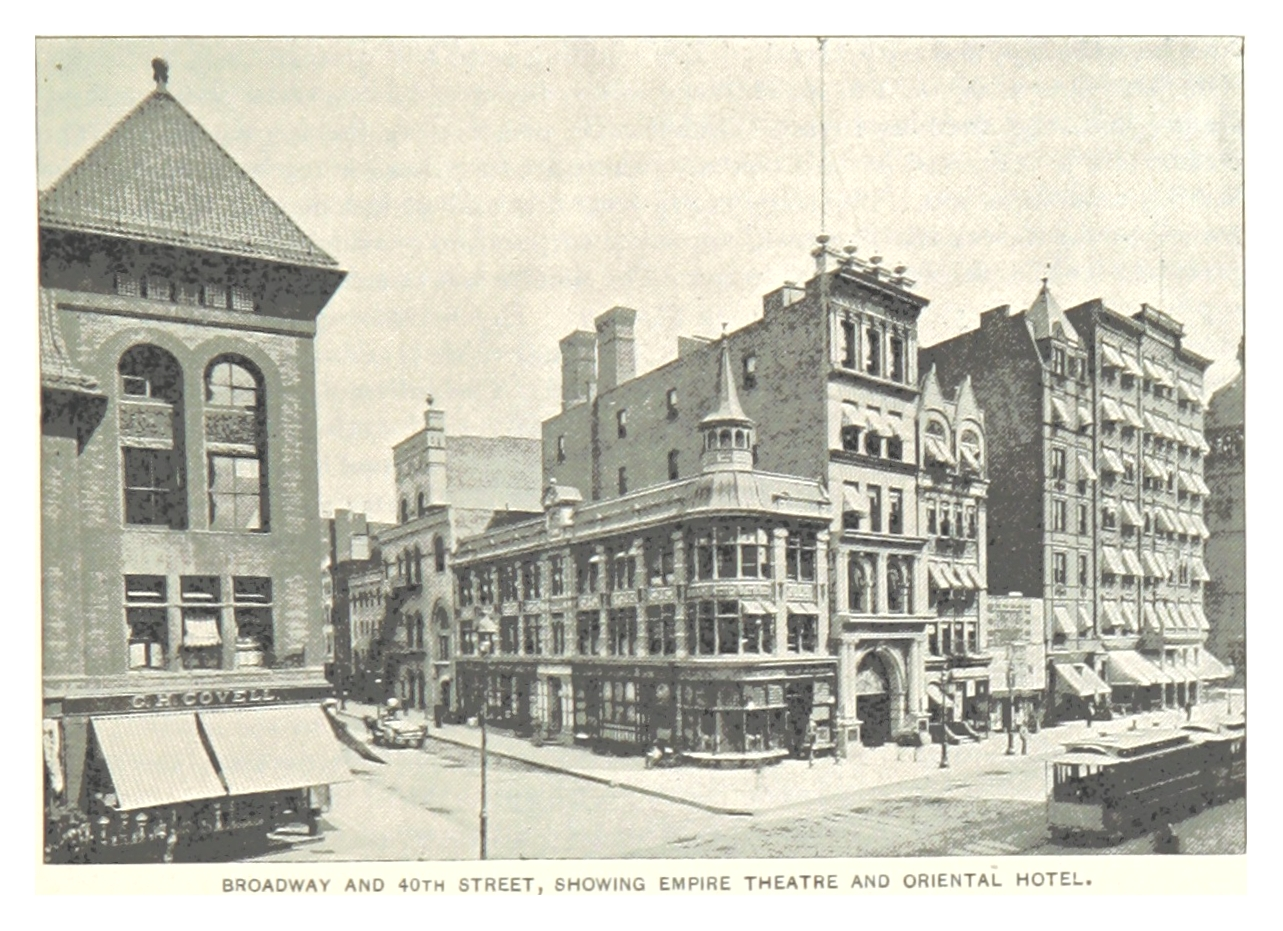
- Industry: Restaurant
- Founded: 1857 (claimed)
- Defunct: 1925
- Headquarters: New York City
- Key people: George F. Browne; Farrington family

Browne's Chop House was a New York City restaurant that was popular with the theatrical crowd. It closed in 1925.

== History ==
=== Founding ===
The establishment was founded by the actor George F. Browne as early as 1857 and at least by 1861 was an eating place for actors, known as the Green Room. It was originally located on Fourteenth Street near Wallack's Theatre, where Browne was a member of the company. It later moved to 33–35 West Twenty-Eighth Street and then to 31 West Twenty-Seventh Street. Frank Farrington bought it after Browne's death and owned it for thirty years.

The restaurant moved to 1424 Broadway, near Fortieth Street, around 1898, across the street from the Metropolitan Opera House and next door to the Empire Theatre. It walls were covered with play programs and signed photographs.

The New York Friars Club met regularly at the restaurant when the club was founded in 1904. Women were not permitted to dine there until the upstairs room was opened to them on Sundays starting in 1911.

=== Closing ===
Browne's closed at the end of June 1925. Its final owner, F. J. Farrington, blamed the growth of speakeasies and cafeterias for the closing, in addition to rising rents and the northward move of the theatrical district.

After the closing of the restaurant, the furnishings and photographs were sold at a public auction. One collector bought all the memorabilia for $480. The owners of the Schrafft's restaurant chain leased the building for a tea room.

=== Present day ===
Today, the former location of Browne's and the Empire Theatre is occupied by a 22-story office building built for Lowenstein & Sons, completed in 1956.
