= A Yank in Libya =

1942 American film directed by Albert Herman

- Directed by: Albert Herman
- Written by: Arthur St. Claire and Sherman Lowe (original story and screenplay)
- Produced by: Geo. M. Merrick
- Starring: Walter Woolf King; Joan Woodbury; H.B. Warner; Parkyakarkus
- Cinematography: Edward Linden A.S.C.
- Edited by: L. R. Brown
- Music by: Lee Zahler (musical director)
- Production companies: An M and H Production
- Distributed by: Producers Releasing Corporation
- Release date: July 24, 1942
- Running time: 67 minutes
- Country: United States
- Language: English

A Yank in Libya is a 1942 American war thriller film directed by Albert Herman and starring H. B. Warner, Walter Woolf King, Parkyarkarkus and Joan Woodbury.

The film depicts a planned uprising in Libya. An American correspondent and a British intelligence agent are aware of the scheme, and they try to flee from the camp of a pro-British sheikh who has been targeted for assassination by the conspirators.

== Plot ==
American correspondent Mike Malone uncovers a Nazi plot for an uprising of the Arab tribes in Libya. Pursued by Sheik David and his men, Mike takes refuge in the suite of Nancy Brooks, who is in the British Intelligence. He asks her to hide a gun and escapes through a window. Reporting the affair to British Consul Herbert Forbes, the latter tries to discourage him from further investigation, as the British are aware of the plot and are planning on staging a coup.

He goes with Mike to Nancy's apartment, and she denies having ever seen him before. Sheik Ibrahim, next in command of the Arab tribe to Sheik David, is plotting with Nazi agent Yussof Streyer to kill David who is friendly with the British. Mike and Nancy have gone to David's camp, escape from Ibrahim's henchmen, and get back to El Moktar before the Arabs attack the garrison.

== Cast ==
- H. B. Warner as Herbert Forbes
- Walter Woolf King as Mike Malone
- Joan Woodbury as Nancy Brooks
- Parkyarkarkus as Benny Sykes
- Duncan Renaldo as Shiek David
- George Lewis as Shiek Ibrahim
- William Vaughn as Yussof Streyer
- Howard Banks as Phillip Graham
- Amarilla Morris as Haditha

== Bibliography ==
- Casaregola, Vincent. Theaters of War: America’s Perceptions of World War II. Springer, 2009.
