= George M. Merrick =

American film editor, film director, producer and screenwriter (1883–1964)

- Born: February 2, 1883; Buffalo, New York, U.S.
- Died: December 16, 1964 (age 81); Los Angeles, California, U.S.
- Occupations: Editor, director, producer, screenwriter
- Known for: Work with Frank Buck

George Martin Merrick (February 2, 1883 – December 16, 1964) was an American film editor, film director, film producer, and screenwriter,

He was a screenwriter of the 1937 serial film Jungle Menace, starring Frank Buck .

== Early life ==
George Merrick was the son of Michael Merrick, a French-born laborer (in the 1900 US census), and Mary Merrick, a Canadian immigrant.

== Career ==
Merrick wrote, edited, directed and produced many films, including:

- The Revenge of Tarzan (1920) co-director
- Rough Riding Ranger (1935) producer, writer
- Pals of the Range (1935) producer, co-writer
- Cyclone of the Saddle (1935) producer, co-writer
- Custer's Last Stand (1936) serial; editor
- The Mysterious Pilot (1937) serial; writer
- The Secret of Treasure Island (1938) serial; producer, writer
- Secrets of a Model (1940) editor
- City of Missing Girls (1941) producer
- I'll Sell My Life (1941) producer
- Miss V from Moscow (1942) producer
- A Yank in Libya (1942) producer
- The Dawn Express (1942) producer
- Submarine Base (1943) writer
- Shake Hands with Murder (1944)
- Sweethearts of the U.S.A. (1944)
- The White Gorilla (1945) producer
- Swing, Cowboy, Swing (1946)

== Work with Frank Buck ==
In 1937, Merrick was a writer of the Frank Buck serial film Jungle Menace, and film editor of Buck's 1944 movie Tiger Fangs.
