= Sinners' Holiday =

1930 film

- Theatrical release poster
- Directed by: John G. Adolfi
- Written by: Harvey F. Thew (screen adaptation); George Rosener (dialogue)
- Based on: Penny Arcade (1930 play) by Marie Baumer
- Starring: Grant Withers; Evalyn Knapp
- Cinematography: Ira H. Morgan
- Edited by: James Gibbon
- Production company: Warner Bros. Pictures
- Distributed by: Warner Bros. Pictures
- Release date: October 11, 1930
- Running time: 60 minutes
- Country: United States
- Language: English

Sinners' Holiday is a 1930 American pre-Code all-talking crime drama film starring Grant Withers and Evalyn Knapp, and featuring James Cagney (in his film debut), Lucille La Verne, and Joan Blondell. It is based on the 1930 play Penny Arcade by Marie Baumer. Both Cagney and Blondell reprised the roles they played in the original Broadway production.

== Plot ==
Full film

Ma Delano runs a penny arcade on an amusement pier at Coney Island with her children Jennie, Joe, and Harry. Underneath La Verne's establishment, Mitch McKane is running a bootleg operation. In order to escape detection, McKane doubles as a sideshow operator.

Angel Harrigan, who works as a barker, is in love with Jennie. When McKane attempts to flirt with Jennie he is thwarted by Angel.

Harry secretly becomes involved in McKanes's bootlegging operation, against the wishes of his mother. When McKane gets picked up by the police on suspicion of bootlegging, Harry takes over his operations and pockets the proceeds. McKane is unexpectedly released from prison and discovers Harry's treachery. He encounters Harry on a darkened pier but Harry shoots him before he can act.

Harry confesses everything to his mother, but she attempts to place the blame on Angel, whom she does not like, by placing the murder weapon in his briefcase. As Angel is about to be taken away by the police, Jennie, who witnessed the crime and is in love with Angel, tells the police the truth, and her brother Harry confesses to the crime, much to the chagrin of his mother.

== Cast ==
- Grant Withers as Angel Harrigan
- Evalyn Knapp as Jennie Delano
- James Cagney as Harry Delano
- Lucille La Verne as Ma Delano (as Lucille LaVerne)
- Noel Madison as Buck Rogers
- Joan Blondell as Myrtle
- Purnell Pratt as Detective Sikes
- Otto Hoffman as George
- Warren Hymer as Mitch McKane
- Ray Gallagher as Joe Delano
- Hank Mann as Happy

== Reception ==
Time magazine felt that the story was credible and that it was refreshing to see a feature that was less than an hour long, with a concise story, as opposed to unnecessarily long hour-and-a-half features, which had recently been released.

== Preservation status ==
The film survives complete; a print is preserved at the Library of Congress.

== Home media ==
In 2015 Sinners' Holiday was released by Warner Archive on DVD.
