= City of Missing Girls =

1941 film by Elmer Clifton

- Directed by: Elmer Clifton
- Written by: Elmer Clifton; Oliver Drake; George Rosener
- Produced by: Max Alexander; George M. Merrick
- Starring: H. B. Warner; Astrid Allwyn; John Archer
- Cinematography: Edward Linden
- Edited by: Charles Henkel Jr.
- Music by: Marvin Hatley
- Production company: Merrick-Alexander Productions
- Distributed by: Select Attractions
- Release date: 27 March 1941
- Running time: 74 minutes
- Country: United States
- Language: English

City of Missing Girls is a 1941 American crime drama film directed by Elmer Clifton and starring H. B. Warner, Astrid Allwyn and John Archer. It was produced as an independent second feature.

== Plot ==
The police led by Captain McVeigh and the Assistant District Attorney James J. Horton are baffled by the disappearances of several young girls with some being found dead. Intrepid female newspaper reporter Nora Page's investigations reveal a link between the girls and the Crescent School of Fine Arts owned by gangster King Peterson, who is using the school as a front for a recruiting center for his nightclub "entertainers". Things become more complex when Nora's father is connected with Peterson and her boyfriend James Horton is photographed in embarrassing circumstances with a woman found murdered after the photo was taken. Peterson shoots Nora's father to death in front of witnesses, and we conclude with her and Horton reading a newspaper article about Peterson's execution.

== Cast ==
- H. B. Warner as Police Capt. "Mac" McVeigh
- Astrid Allwyn as Nora Page
- John Archer as Assistant D.A. James J. Horton
- Sarah Padden as Mrs. Randolph
- Philip Van Zandt as King Peterson
- George Rosener as Police Officer 'Copper' Dugan
- Kathryn Crawford as Helen Whitney
- Patricia Knox as Kate Nelson
- Walter Long as Police Officer Larkin
- Gale Storm as Mary Phillips
- Boyd Irwin as Joseph 'Joe' Thompson
- Danny Webb as William 'Bill' Short, Photographer
- Herb Vigran as Danny Mason
- Lloyd Ingraham as District Attorney Fowler
- Dorothy Granger as Showgirl
- Lassie Lou Ahern as Nightclub Performer
- Donald Curtis as Reporter

== Critical reception ==
TV Guide called it "An awkward murder mystery."

== Bibliography ==
- Tucker, David C. Gale Storm: A Biography and Career Record. McFarland, 2018.
