= Night Spot =

1938 film by Christy Cabanne

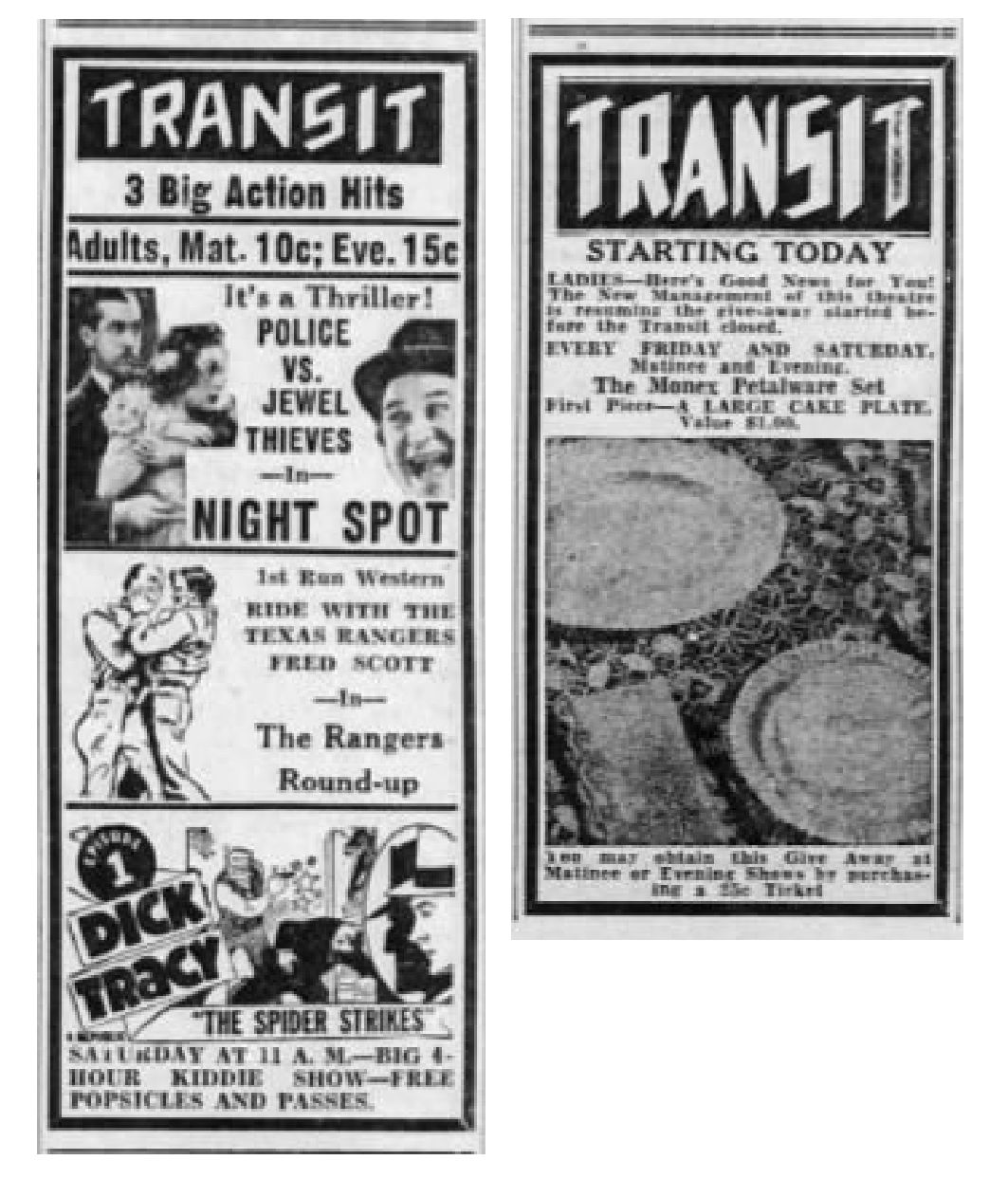
- Newspaper advertisement
- Directed by: Christy Cabanne
- Screenplay by: Lionel Houser
- Based on: She Sang for Her Supper by Anne Jordan
- Produced by: Robert Sisk
- Starring: Parkyakarkus; Allan Lane; Gordon Jones; Joan Woodbury
- Cinematography: Nicholas Musuraca
- Edited by: Harry Marker
- Music by: Roy Webb
- Production company: RKO Pictures
- Distributed by: RKO Pictures
- Release date: February 25, 1938
- Running time: 60 minutes
- Country: United States
- Language: English

Night Spot is a 1938 American comedy film directed by Christy Cabanne and written by Lionel Houser. The film stars Parkyakarkus, Allan Lane, Gordon Jones and Joan Woodbury. The film was released on February 25, 1938, by RKO Pictures.

== Plot ==
Marge Dexter is bored with her career and wants to sing, so she goes to an interview at the Royal Beach Club owned by gangster Marty Davis, she gets the job, but there are two policemen working undercover as band members.

== Cast ==
- Parkyakarkus as Gashouse
- Allan Lane as Pete Cooper
- Gordon Jones as Riley
- Joan Woodbury as Marge Dexter
- Lee Patrick as Flo Bradley
- Bradley Page as Marty Davis
- Jack Carson as Shallen
- Frank M. Thomas as Headwaiter
- Joseph Crehan as Inspector Wayland
- Crawford Weaver as Smokey
- Cecil Kellaway as Willard Lorryweather
- Rollo Lloyd as Vail
