= Charles Einstein =

Newspaperman, sportswriter, and novelist (1926–2007)

- Born: August 2, 1926; Boston, Massachusetts, U.S.
- Died: March 7, 2007 (aged 80); Michigan City, Indiana, U.S.
- Occupations: Journalist, novelist, editor, screenwriter
- Father: Harry Einstein
- Family: Albert Brooks (half-brother); Bob Einstein (half-brother)

Charles Einstein (August 2, 1926 – March 7, 2007) was a newspaperman and sportswriter. He was the author of the 1953 novel The Bloody Spur, on which the film While the City Sleeps (1956), directed by Fritz Lang, was based. Einstein's father was the comedian Harry Einstein. He was the older half-brother of comedic actors Albert Brooks and Bob Einstein, better known by his stage name "Super Dave Osborne".

== Bibliography ==
- The Bloody Spur, Dell First Edition #5, pbo, 1953. reprinted as While the City Sleeps (Dell D86, 1956).
- Wiretap!, Dell First Edition #76, pbo, 1955.
- The Only Game In Town, Dell First Edition 47, pbo, 1955
- The Last Laugh, Dell First Edition A121, pbo, 1956.
- No Time at All, Simon & Schuster, hc, 1957. Dell, pb, 1958.
- The Naked City, Dell First Edition A180, pbo, 1959; TV tie-in comprising the following short stories adapting teleplays by series creator Stirling Silliphant:

- And a Merry Christmas to the Force on Patrol
- Lady Bug, Lady Bug…
- Line of Duty
- Meridian
- Nickel Ride
- The Other Face of Goodness
- Susquehanna 7-8367
- The Violent Circle

- A Flag for San Francisco, Simon and Schuster, Inc, 1962, J. Lowell Pratt and Company, pb, 1963
- The Day New York Went Dry, Fawcett Gold Medal, 1967.
- Woman Times Seven, Fawcett Gold Medal, pbo, 1967; adaptation of the anthology screenplay by Cesare Zavattini, comprising the following short stories:

- The Funeral Procession
- Amateur Night
- Two Against One
- The Super-Simone
- At the Opera
- The Suicides
- Snow

- The Blackjack Hijack, Random House, 1976. Fawcett Crest, pb, 1976.
- Willie's Time, Southern Illinois University Press, 1979.

Einstein was also the editor of a series of compilations of baseball writings, titled The Fireside Book of Baseball.

== In popular culture ==
Einstein was referenced in Ariel Pink's 2014 song, "Lipstick." The song was inspired by the Lipstick Killer, which Einstein wrote about in his 1953 novel The Bloody Spur.
