= There's No Tomorrow =

Single by Tony Martin
- B-side: "A Thousand Violins"
- Released: 1949
- Genre: pop
- Length: 3:15
- Label: RCA Victor
- Songwriters: Al Hoffman; Leo Corday; Leon Carr

"There's No Tomorrow", written by Al Hoffman, Leo Corday, and Leon Carr, is one of two popular songs based on the Italian song, "'O sole mio" (music by Eduardo di Capua). (The other was "It's Now or Never", popularized by Elvis Presley.)

The biggest hit version of the song was recorded by Tony Martin, which charted in 1949. The recording was released by RCA Victor Records as a 78 rpm record (catalog number 20-3582) and a 45 rpm record (catalog number 47-3078). The record first reached the Billboard chart on November 4, 1949, and lasted 27 weeks on the chart, peaking at number two.

Martin was attending a Friars Club of Beverly Hills roast for Lucille Ball and Desi Arnaz on November 24, 1958, in Los Angeles. Right after comedian Harry Einstein (alias "Parkyarkarkus") brought the house down with his amusing testimonial, Einstein suddenly suffered a heart attack, slumping into Milton Berle's lap. Emcee Art Linkletter then directed Martin to sing a song to divert the crowd's attention; the singer's unfortunate choice was "There's No Tomorrow". Einstein's heart attack proved fatal, and Martin was a pallbearer at the comedian's funeral.
