= Dean Ward (screenwriter) =

American screenwriter and filmmaker

Dean Ward is an American screenwriter, television comedy writer and documentary filmmaker.

== Early life ==
Ward was raised in Brookline, Massachusetts and graduated from Brookline High School. He attended New York University.

== Career ==
As a television comedy writer, Ward has written for "Chelsea, Lately," "After Lately," "Talk Soup," "Penn & Teller: Bullshit," "The Josh Wolf Show" and the Netflix talk show "Chelsea." His screenwriting credits include work for CBS Films and Frank Sinatra Enterprises.

Ward's documentary film "Let Me In, I Hear Laughter - A Salute To The Friars Club" appeared on Cinemax and features interviews with legendary members of the Friars Club including Steve Allen, Milton Berle, Red Buttons, Sid Caesar, Jack Carter, Norm Crosby, Phyllis Diller, Susie Essman, Buddy Hackett, Jeff Ross and Henny Youngman. The film also chronicles the untimely death of comedian Harry Einstein (a.k.a. "Parkyakarkus") shortly after performing at a Friars Club dinner honoring Lucille Ball and Desi Arnaz in 1958. Einstein was the father of comedians Bob Einstein and Albert Brooks. Rolling Stone Magazine called the film “a funny, lovable documentary featuring memories from a bunch of amazing comedians old enough to have shtupped Adam Sandler’s grandmother.” Ward was interviewed on Fresh Air With Terry Gross while promoting the film's release.

Ward's documentary "The Bielski Brothers: Jerusalem In The Woods" earned him an Emmy Nomination in the category of Best Research.

Ward hosts "The No-Show Roast Show" on the Callin Podcast Network, which has featured appearances by comedians Chelsea Handler, Ian Karmel, Greg Fitzsimmons, Wayne Federman and many others.
