= Parkyakarkus =

American comedian, writer, and character actor (1904–1958)

Harry Einstein
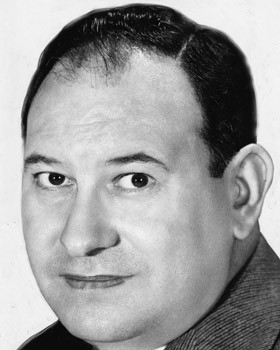
- Born: May 6, 1904; Boston, Massachusetts, U.S.
- Died: November 24, 1958 (aged 54); Los Angeles, California, U.S.
- Spouses: Lillian Anshen (m. 1925; div. 1929) Thelma Leeds (m. 1937)
- Children: 4, including Charles Einstein, Albert Brooks, and Bob Einstein

Comedy career
- Years active: 1924–1954
- Genres: Stand-up, dialect comedy

Harry Einstein (May 6, 1904 – November 24, 1958), known professionally as Harry Parke and other pseudonyms, most commonly Parkyakarkus (/ˌpɑːrkjəˈkɑːrkəs/ PARK-yə-KAR-kəs), was an American comedian, writer, and character actor. A specialist in Greek dialect comedy, he became famous as the Greek chef Nick Parkyakarkus on the Eddie Cantor and Al Jolson radio programs, and later on a program of his own. He appeared in eleven films (as Parkyakarkus or a close variant) from 1936 to 1945. He was also the father of comedians and actors Albert Brooks and Bob Einstein (who performed as Super Dave Osborne and as Marty Funkhouser in Curb Your Enthusiasm).

== Personal life and early career ==
Einstein was born in Boston, Massachusetts, the son of Sarah (née Klayman), who came from a Jewish family in Russia; and Charles Einstein, a Jewish pawnbroker from Austria, who had an importing business. Einstein attended The English High School in Boston.

Einstein first worked as a newspaper reporter, but then moved into advertising for Boston's Hearst Newspapers. In his spare time, he enjoyed performing comedy routines. During 1924–1925, he became popular on radio as "The Bad Boy from a Good Home", doing comedy skits on Boston station WEEI. He also worked in advertising for the Taylor Furniture Company, where he managed its radio department. He subsequently continued in the advertising business at another Boston furniture store, Summerfield's, while performing dialect comedy for friends at parties.

One of his friends, Boston bandleader Joe Rines, tried to persuade him to become a full-time comedian, but by this time, he was making a good living as advertising manager for Kane's Furniture. Einstein finally agreed to make an appearance on Rines' radio program; he created the Greek character of Nick Parkyakarkus for a skit on that show. The character was very well received by the listeners, and it ultimately led to the national networks' taking notice. Einstein got his big break nationally when he was first heard as a performer on Eddie Cantor's radio show in 1934.

In addition to performing on Eddie Cantor's program throughout the mid-to-late 1930s, Einstein also was a guest performer on the Al Jolson Show. When he was not performing on radio, he acted in a few comedy films during this time, including Strike Me Pink (1936), The Life of the Party (1937), and New Faces of 1937. He met his second wife, actress Thelma Leeds, while making New Faces of 1937. He and Thelma had three sons (he had one other son with his first wife, Lillian). During the 1930s, Einstein became so inextricably linked with his character that he attempted—unsuccessfully—to change his name legally to Parkyakarkus; a judge denied his request. His star on the Hollywood Walk of Fame bears his character's name instead of his own.

== Meet Me at Parky's ==
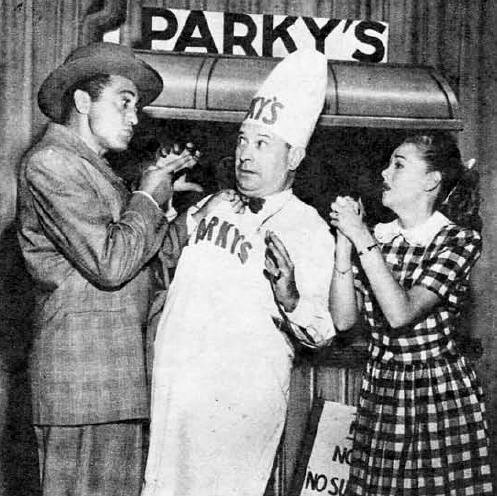
Einstein as Parky caught between Sheldon Leonard and Betty Rhodes in 1948.

As a result of his popularity on the Cantor program, Einstein began a radio show of his own in 1945 called Meet Me at Parky's, featuring the same character, Greek restaurant owner Nick Parkyakarkus. It ran for two seasons on NBC before moving to the Mutual Broadcasting System in 1947 for a third and final season. Einstein wrote most of the program's scripts himself. Sheldon Leonard, Elliott Lewis, and Betty Rhodes were part of the cast, with Rhodes augmenting her support acting as a female singer.

== Later years ==
Einstein had a history of heart disease, which limited his mobility and stamina. After his radio show was terminated, his appearances were largely confined to Friars' Club roasts.

=== Death ===
Einstein suffered a fatal heart attack on Sunday, November 23, 1958, at age 54, during a roast in honor of actress/comedienne Lucille Ball and Desi Arnaz. After Einstein delivered his monologue, emcee Art Linkletter remarked, "Every time he finishes, I ask myself, why isn't he on the air in a prime time?" Einstein turned to Milton Berle, who was seated next to him on the dais, and said, "Yeah, how come?"—then slumped into his lap. Berle's shout of "Is there a doctor in the house?" was initially thought to be a humorous ad lib (the event was a charity benefit for local hospitals and several physicians were in attendance), but the gravity of the situation quickly became clear.

Einstein was carried backstage, where five physicians worked to revive him. One surgeon used his pen knife to make an incision for open heart massage; another used the ends of an electric cord as a makeshift defibrillator. With the remaining comedians on the bill reluctant to continue under the circumstances, Art Linkletter asked Tony Martin to sing a song; Martin's unfortunate choice was "There's No Tomorrow". Ball then came to the microphone and managed only, "I can say nothing," through tears. Arnaz, the closing speaker, said, "This is one of those moments that Lucy and I have waited a lifetime for, but it's meaningless now. They say the show must go on, but why must it? Let's close the show now by praying for this wonderful man backstage who has made a world laugh."

Despite two hours of continuous resuscitation attempts by the physician volunteers and a rescue squad, Einstein was pronounced dead at 1:20 a.m. on November 24. The news of his death was the Los Angeles Times' front-page headline later that morning. Einstein's funeral service was attended by 300 mourners. After a eulogy by George Jessel, Einstein was buried in Home of Peace mausoleum in Los Angeles.

=== Aftermath ===
The argument has been made that Albert Brooks, who was 11 years old when Einstein died, has dealt with the trauma of his father's passing through vignettes in his movies. For example, early in Defending Your Life (1991), Brooks's recently deceased character, Daniel Miller, finds himself in an afterlife nightclub, watching a terrible comedian. "How'd you die?" the comic asks him; Albert replies, "Onstage, like you." Later, Meryl Streep's character invites Albert to leave with her. "I can't," he says, gesturing toward the stage. "That's my father."

In the Season 9 episode of Comedians in Cars Getting Coffee, "It's Not So Funny When It's Your Mother," his son Bob Einstein tells host Jerry Seinfeld that the incident of his father dying on-stage at the Friars Club roast, when Bob Einstein was 16 years old, turned him off from performing for many years. Specifically, he was highly offended by the fact that both Milton Berle and George Jessel performed their comedy routines as eulogies at Harry Einstein's funeral, feeling it was insensitive, and this made him uncomfortable with comedy. The episode featured an excerpt, covering the events of Harry Einstein's passing, from the documentary film Let Me In, I Hear Laughter - A Salute To The Friars Club directed by Dean Ward.

== Family ==
Einstein was the father of four sons: the writer Charles Einstein (by his first marriage to Lillian Anshen), comedians Albert Brooks and Bob Einstein, and advertising executive Clifford Einstein (with his second wife, actress Thelma Leeds). Harry and Lillian divorced in 1929.

== Filmography ==
- Strike Me Pink (1936) - Parkyakarkus (credited as Parkyakarkus)
- New Faces of 1937 (1937) - Parky (credited as Parkyakarkus)
- The Life of the Party (1937) - Parky (credited as Parkyakarkus)
- She's Got Everything (1937) - Nick Zyteras (credited as Parkyakarkus)
- Night Spot (1938) - Gashouse (credited as Parkyakarkus)
- A Yank in Libya (1942) - 'Parky' Parkyarkarkus (credited as Parkyarkarkus)
- Sweethearts of the U.S.A. (1944) - Parky (credited as Parkyakarkus)
- Movie Pests (Short) (1944) - Peanut-Eating Pest (uncredited)
- The Yanks Are Coming (1942) - Parky (credited as Parkyarkarkus)
- Earl Carroll Vanities (1945) - Walter (credited as Parkyakarkus)
- Out of This World (1945) - Gus Palukas (credited as Parkyakarkus)
- No Time at All (1958) - Mr. Laurie (credited as Harry Einstein) - episode on "Playhouse 90", a TV series broadcast in 1958

== See also ==
- List of entertainers who died during a performance
