= Ellis Island (1936 film) =

1936 film by Phil Rosen

- Directed by: Phil Rosen
- Written by: Arthur T. Horman
- Produced by: Maury M. Cohen
- Starring: Donald Cook; Peggy Shannon; Jack La Rue
- Cinematography: M.A. Anderson
- Edited by: Holbrook N. Todd
- Music by: Gene Johnston; Lee Zahler
- Production company: Invincible Pictures
- Distributed by: Chesterfield Pictures
- Release date: November 5, 1936
- Running time: 67 minutes
- Country: United States
- Language: English

Ellis Island is a 1936 American crime film directed by Phil Rosen and starring Donald Cook, Peggy Shannon and Jack La Rue.

== Plot ==
Gary Curtis and Kip Andrews are INS deportation officers at the Ellis Island immigrant station.

== Cast ==
- Donald Cook as Gary Curtis
- Peggy Shannon as Betty Parker
- Jack La Rue as Dude
- Johnny Arthur as Kip Andrews
- Joyce Compton as Adele
- Bradley Page as Solo
- George Rosener as Uncle Ted Kedrich
- Maurice Black as Nails
- Bryant Washburn as Peter James
- E.H. Calvert as Mr. Carson, Commissioner of Ellis Island
- Matty Fain as Turk
- Monte Vandergrift as Moxey
- Lew Kelly as Farmer
- Ann Brody as Matron

== Bibliography ==
- Michael R. Pitts. Poverty Row Studios, 1929-1940: An Illustrated History of 55 Independent Film Companies, with a Filmography for Each. McFarland & Company, 2005. ISBN 978-0-7864-2319-4
