= Beethoven (franchise) =

American comedy film series

- Created by: John Hughes; Amy Holden Jones
- Original work: Beethoven (1992)
- Owner: Universal Pictures
- Years: 1992–2014

Films and television
- Film(s): Beethoven (1992); Beethoven's 2nd (1993); Beethoven's 3rd (2000); Beethoven's 4th (2001); Beethoven's 5th (2003); Beethoven's Big Break (2008); Beethoven's Christmas Adventure (2011); Beethoven's Treasure Tail (2014)
- Animated series: Beethoven (1994)

Games
- Video game(s): Beethoven: The Ultimate Canine Caper (1993)

Beethoven is a series of eight American films, created by John Hughes (credited as Edmond Dantès) and Amy Holden Jones, in which the plot revolves around a family attempting to control the antics of their pet Saint Bernard (named Beethoven). The first two films were theatrical releases and all subsequent releases have been direct to video. The original Beethoven was released in theaters in April 1992. Its opening grossed $7,587,565 and was the year's 26th largest grossing film in the U.S. at $57,114,049.

== Films ==
| Film | U.S. release date | Director(s) | Screenwriter(s) | Story by | Producer(s) |
|---|---|---|---|---|---|
| Beethoven | April 3, 1992 | Brian Levant | | | |
| Beethoven's 2nd | December 17, 1993 | Rod Daniel | | | |
| Beethoven's 3rd | July 25, 2000 | David Mickey Evans | | | |
| Beethoven's 4th | December 4, 2001 | David Mickey Evans | | | |
| Beethoven's 5th | December 2, 2003 | Mark Griffiths | | | |
| Beethoven's Big Break | December 30, 2008 | Mike Elliott | | | |
| Beethoven's Christmas Adventure | November 8, 2011 | John Putch | | | |
| Beethoven's Treasure Tail | October 28, 2014 | Ron Oliver | | | |

=== Beethoven (1992) ===
In Beethoven, the Newton family finds and adopts a Saint Bernard. The family, with the exception of the father, George (Charles Grodin), becomes attached to the dog. Meanwhile, a sadistic veterinarian, Dr. Herman Varnick (Dean Jones) involved with animal experimentation is planning to kill Beethoven for his latest experiment, and George, after discovering his fondness for the dog, springs into action to rescue his pet. Beethoven was released on April 3, 1992.

=== Beethoven's 2nd (1993) ===
In Beethoven's 2nd, Beethoven sires a litter of puppies, and the Newton family tries to save them from the greedy owner Regina (Debi Mazar), who alternately wishes to kill or sell the puppies. Beethoven's 2nd was released on December 17, 1993.

=== Beethoven's 3rd (2000) ===
In Beethoven's 3rd, the dog is sent across the country in an RV to attend a family reunion. While George and his family are in Europe, Beethoven is riding with the relatives of the Newtons led by George's brother Richard (Judge Reinhold) as the family avoids criminals that are after a DVD copy of The Shakiest Gun in the West that has a computer code hidden in it. Beethoven's 3rd was released on July 25, 2000.

=== Beethoven's 4th (2001) ===
In Beethoven's 4th, Beethoven accidentally switches with another St. Bernard named Michelangelo who comes from the Sedgewick family, and is pampered and well-behaved. Beethoven tries to find a way to get home, while a butler who works for the Sedgewick family wants to kidnap Michelangelo for ransom. Beethoven's 4th was released on December 4, 2001.

=== Beethoven's 5th (2003) ===
Sara takes Beethoven to visit her oddball uncle in the old mining town Quicksilver, where they discover the hidden treasure while also facing two bank robbers who want it too. The last installment of the original storyline, Beethoven's 5th was released on December 2, 2003.

=== Beethoven's Big Break (2008) ===
A reboot of the series where Beethoven becomes a movie star. Beethoven's Big Break was released on December 30, 2008.

=== Beethoven's Christmas Adventure (2011) ===
In Beethoven's Christmas Adventure, Beethoven teams up with the elf from the North Pole named Henry (Kyle Massey) and a young boy Mason Cooper (Munro Chambers) and a young 13-year-old Tori McBride (Haley Pullos) to find a missing Santa's toy bag that fell in the small town Wood Haven, Minnesota, while also facing two men from a toy store, Sylvester Smirch (Robert Picardo) and his assistant Kenny (Curtis Armstrong), who grab Santa's bag and use it for financial gains.

Unlike other films in the franchise, Beethoven has a speaking voice, which was provided by Tom Arnold. The film features narration by John Cleese and was released on November 8, 2011.

=== Beethoven's Treasure Tail (2014) ===
After getting fired from a film, Beethoven begins the long journey home with his trainer, Eddie. They become stranded in a small coastal town, where the beloved canine befriends a young boy who is searching for buried treasure. Beethoven's Treasure Tail was released on October 28, 2014.

== Television ==
| Series | Season | Episodes | First released | Last released | Showrunner(s) | Network(s) |
|---|---|---|---|---|---|---|
| Beethoven | 1 | 13 | September 10, 1994 | December 3, 1994 | | |

== Cast and crew ==
=== Principal cast ===
| Characters | Original series | | | | | Reboot series | | | Animated series |
| Characters | Beethoven | Beethoven's 2nd | Beethoven's 3rd | Beethoven's 4th | Beethoven's 5th | Beethoven's Big Break | Beethoven's Christmas Adventure | Beethoven's Treasure Tail | Beethoven |
| Characters | 1992 | 1993 | 2000 | 2001 | 2003 | 2008 | 2011 | 2014 | 1994 |
|---|---|---|---|---|---|---|---|---|---|
| Beethoven | Chris | Chris | Cujo | Cujo | J.S. Barque | Cujo | Tom Arnold (voice) | Cujo | Joel Murray (voice) |
| Beethoven | Chris | Chris | Cujo | Cujo | J.S. Barque | Cujo | Dee Bradley Baker (voice) | Dee Bradley Baker (voice) | Joel Murray (voice) |
| George Newton | Charles Grodin | Charles Grodin | | | | Grant Elliott | | | Dean Jones |
| Alice Newton | Bonnie Hunt | Bonnie Hunt | | | | | | | Kath Soucie |
| Ryce Newton | Nicholle Tom | Nicholle Tom | | | | | | | Nicholle Tom |
| Ted Newton | Christopher Castile | Christopher Castile | | | | | | | J.D. Daniels |
| Emily Newton | Sarah Rose Karr | Sarah Rose Karr | | | | | | | Francesca Marie Smith |
| Sara Newton | | | Michaela Gallo | Michaela Gallo | Daveigh Chase | | | | |
| Richard Newton | | | Judge Reinhold | Judge Reinhold | | | | | |
| Beth Newton | | | Julia Sweeney | Julia Sweeney | | | | | |
| Brennan Newton | | | Joe Pichler | Joe Pichler | | | | | |
| Eddie Thornton "Lizard Guy" | | | | | | Jonathan Silverman | | Jonathan Silverman | |
| Dr. Herman Varnick | Dean Jones | | | | | | | | |
| Harvey | Oliver Platt | | | | | | | | |
| Vernon | Stanley Tucci | | | | | | | | |
| Brad Wilson | David Duchovny | | | | | | | | |
| Brie Wilson | Patricia Heaton | | | | | | | | |
| Devonia Peet | Laurel Cronin | | | | | | | | |
| Miss Grundel | Nancy Fish | | | | | | | | |
| Student #1 | Joseph Gordon-Levitt | | | | | | | | |
| Ammo Gun Salesman | Richard Portnow | | | | | | | | |
| Regina | | Debi Mazar | | | | | | | |
| Floyd | | Chris Penn | | | | | | | |
| Taylor Devereaux | | Ashley Hamilton | | | | | | | |
| Seth | | Danny Masterson | | | | | | | |
| Janie | | Catherine Reitman | | | | | | | |
| Cliff Klamath | | Maury Chaykin | | | | | | | |
| Michelle | | Heather McComb | | | | | | | |
| Banker | | Scott Waara | | | | | | | |
| Gus | | Jeff Corey | | | | | | | |
| Linda Anderson | | Virginia Capers | | | | | | | |
| Jordan Bond | | Himself | | | | | | | |
| Arthur Lewis | | Pat Jankiewicz | | | | | | | |
| Brillo | | Kevin Dunn | | | | | | | |
| Tommy | | | Mike Ciccolini | | | | | | |
| "Bill" William | | | Jamie Marsh | | | | | | |
| Penny | | | Danielle Weiner | | | | | | |
| Morrie Newton | | | Frank Gorshin | | | | | | |
| Kennel Employee | | | Holly Mitchell | | | | | | |
| Madison Sedgewick | | | | Kaleigh Krish | | | | | |
| Reginald Sedgewick | | | | Matt McCoy | | | | | |
| Martha Sedgewick | | | | Veanne Cox | | | | | |
| Bill | | | | Jeff Coopwood | | | | | |
| Marlowe | | | | Dorien Wilson | | | | | |
| Jonathan "Johnnie" Simmons | | | | Mark Lindsay Chapman | | | | | |
| Nigel Bigalow | | | | Nick Meaney | | | | | |
| Hayley | | | | Natalie Elizabeth Marston | | | | | |
| Sergeant Rutledge | | | | Art LaFleur | | | | | |
| Mrs. Florence Rutledge | | | | June Lu | | | | | |
| Freddy Kablinski | | | | | Dave Thomas | | | | |
| Sheriff Julie Dempsey | | | | | Faith Ford | | | | |
| John Giles (né Selig) | | | | | Tom Poston | | | | |
| Cora Wilkens | | | | | Katherine Helmond | | | | |
| Garret | | | | | Sammy Kahn | | | | |
| Vaughn Carter | | | | | Richard Riehle | | | | |
| Owen Tuttle | | | | | Clint Howard | | | | |
| Evie Kling | | | | | Kathy Griffin | | | | |
| Mayor Harold Herman | | | | | John Larroquette | | | | |
| Moe Selig | | | | | Rodman Flender | | | | |
| Rita Selig | | | | | Tina Illman | | | | |
| Jim | | | | | Tom Musgrave | | | | |
| Phil Dobsonn | | | | | Joel Hurt Jones | | | | |
| Mrs. Dobsonn | | | | | Elizabeth Warner | | | | |
| Lisa Waters | | | | | | Jennifer Finnigan | | | |
| Billy Thornton | | | | | | Moises Arias | | | |
| Stanley Mitchell | | | | | | Eddie Griffin | | | |
| Patricia Benji | | | | | | Rhea Perlman | | | |
| Sal DeMarco Ned Ryerson | | | | | | Stephen Tobolowsky | | | |
| Tick | | | | | | Oscar Nunez | | | |
| Bones | | | | | | Joey Fatone | | | |
| Katie | | | | | | Stefanie Scott | | | |
| Cesar Millan | | | | | | Himself | | | |
| Studio Executive | | | | | | John Augello | | | |
| Lewis | | | | | | Zach Kosnitzky | | | |
| Craft Service Person | | | | | | Ali Eagle | | | |
| Marco | | | | | | Adam Vernier | | | |
| Mason | | | | | | | Munro Chambers | | |
| Christine | | | | | | | Kim Rhodes | | |
| Smirch | | | | | | | Robert Picardo | | |
| Kenny | | | | | | | Curtis Armstrong | | |
| Henry | | | | | | | Kyle Massey | | |
| Mr. Rexford | | | | | | | John O'Hurley | | |
| Catty Elf | | | | | | | Ryan Miller | | |
| Catty Elf's Friend | | | | | | | Shannon Jacques | | |
| Mom | | | | | | | Tamra Ugto | | |
| Dad | | | | | | | Alan Castanaga | | |
| Little Kid | | | | | | | Solmund MacPherson | | |
| Field Producer | | | | | | | Kristen Sawatzky | | |
| Keilbasa Vendor | | | | | | | Rick Skene | | |
| Stray Dog (voice) | | | | | | | John Kassir (voice) | | |
| Anne Parker | | | | | | | | Kristy Swanson | |
| Sam Parker | | | | | | | | Bretton Manley | |
| Howard Belch The Fake Fritz Bruchschnauser | | | | | | | | Jeffrey Combs | |
| Simon | | | | | | | | Alec Mapa | |
| Grace O'Malley | | | | | | | | Jayne Eastwood | |
| Phil | | | | | | | | David DeLuise | |
| Trentino | | | | | | | | Brian George | |
| The Real Fritz Bruchschnauser | | | | | | | | Udo Kier | |
| Dr. Kelp | | | | | | | | Colin Mochrie | |
| Duncan | | | | | | | | Richard Dumont | |
| Charlene | | | | | | | | Morgan Fairchild | |
| Justin | | | | | | | | Patrick Kwok-Choon | |
| Film Crew Member | | | | | | | | Ian Tench | |
| Assistant Director | | | | | | | | Nikki Barnett | |
| Norman the Magician | | | | | | | | Brian Downey | |
| Captain Patrick O'Malley | | | | | | | | Tom Scott | |
| Burly Crew Man | | | | | | | | Jacob Sampson | |
| Sandra | | | | | | | | Onika Drabble | |
| Callie | | | | | | | | Katherine Shore | |
| Caesar the Great Dane | | | | | | | | | Bill Fagerbakke |
| Mr. Huggs | | | | | | | | | Brian George |
| Ginger the Collie | | | | | | | | | Tress MacNeille |
| Sparky the Jack Russel Terrier | | | | | | | | | Joe Pantoliano |
| Killer the Poodle | | | | | | | | | Hank Azaria |
| Mailman | | | | | | | | | Gregg Berger |
| Blind Shep | | | | | | | | | Dan Castellaneta David Doyle |
| Rosebud | | | | | | | | | Christine Cavanaugh |
| Peanut | | | | | | | | | E.G. Daily |
| Singing Donut | | | | | | | | | Jess Harnell |
| Timmy | | | | | | | | | Dana Hill |
| Watson | | | | | | | | | Tony Jay |
| Roger | | | | | | | | | Justin Shenkarow |

- Note: A dark gray cell indicates the character does not appear in the film.

=== Additional crew ===
| Film | Director(s) | Producer(s) | Screenwriter(s) | Composer(s) | Cinematographer | Editor(s) |
|---|---|---|---|---|---|---|
| Beethoven | Brian Levant | Joe Medjuck; Michael C. Gross | Edmond Dantés; Amy Holden Jones | Randy Edelman | Victor J. Kemper | William D. Gordean; Sheldon Kahn |
| Beethoven's 2nd | Rod Daniel | Joe Medjuck; Michael C. Gross | Len Blum | Randy Edelman | Bill Butler | William D. Gordean; Sheldon Kahn |
| Beethoven's 3rd | David Mickey Evans | David Bixler; Kelli Konop | Jeff Schechter | Philip Giffin | John Aronson | Harry Keramidas |
| Beethoven's 4th | David Mickey Evans | Kelli Konop | John Loy | Philip Giffin | John Aronson | C. Timothy O'Meara |
| Beethoven's 5th | Mark Griffiths | Mike Elliott | Cliff Ruby & Elana Lesser | Adam Berry | Christopher Baffa | John Gilbert |
| Beethoven's Big Break | Mike Elliott | Mike Elliott | Mike Elliott | Robert Folk; Paul DiFranco | Stephen F. Campbell | Roderick Davis |
| Beethoven's Christmas Adventure | John Putch | Jeff Freilich | Daniel Altiere & Steven Altiere | Chris Bacon | Ross Berryman | John Gilbert |
| Beethoven's Treasure Tail | Ron Oliver | Albert T. Dickerson III | Ron Oliver | Chris Hajian | C. Kim Miles | Heath Ryan |

== Reception ==
| Film | Rotten Tomatoes | CinemaScore |
|---|---|---|
| Beethoven | 31% (26 reviews) | A |
| Beethoven's 2nd | 25% (12 reviews) | A |
| Beethoven's 3rd | 0% (7 reviews) | |
| Beethoven's 4th | 0% (8 reviews) | |
| Beethoven's 5th | —N/a | |
| Beethoven's Big Break | —N/a | |
| Beethoven's Christmas Adventure | —N/a | |
| Beethoven's Treasure Tail | —N/a | |

== Home media ==
All films are available on DVD, both individually and as part of packs and collections of two or more films.

== Video games ==
In 1993, a side-scrolling video game was released called Beethoven: The Ultimate Canine Caper based on Beethoven's 2nd for Super NES, Game Boy, and MS-DOS. Versions of the game for the Genesis and Game Gear were developed, but they were cancelled before release.

== See also ==
- Air Bud (series)
