= The Montecito Picture Company =

American film production company

The Montecito Picture Company, LLC
- Formerly: Ivan Reitman Productions (1976-1990); Northern Lights Entertainment (1990-1998)
- Type: Public
- Industry: Motion pictures
- Founded: 1976; 50 years ago (as Ivan Reitman Productions; in-name only); 1990; 36 years ago (as Northern Lights Entertainment); 1998; 28 years ago (registered as The Montecito Picture Company)
- Founders: Ivan Reitman
- Headquarters: 10202 West Washington Boulevard, Culver City, California; U.S.
- Key people: Amie Karp (president); Jason Reitman (COO)

The Montecito Picture Company, LLC (formerly Ivan Reitman Productions and Northern Lights Entertainment) is an American film production company founded in 1976 by film director Ivan Reitman and joined in 1998 by studio executive Tom Pollock. It is located in the Sony Pictures lot in Culver City, California, United States, in a building labeled as "Ghost Corps," where the vehicle from Ghostbusters is parked outside. Montecito is a city in California in Santa Barbara County.

== History ==
=== Ivan Reitman Productions/Northern Lights Entertainment (1976-1998) ===
In 1976, Ivan Reitman was left as production manager for the Canadian film studio Cinépix to pursue independent production, making American films under the in-name only banner Ivan Reitman Productions. The first project was National Lampoon's Animal House for Universal Pictures, so Reitman fulfilled his obligations to Cinépix by directing the Canadian film Meatballs after the success of Animal House, and became a smash success.

The company hit its stride after the success of Animal House, by obtaining the rights to the publication Heavy Metal. The eventual film was released in 1981 by Columbia Pictures. Reitman begin producing and directing films under the banner with Stripes and Ghostbusters for Columbia Pictures, two of the biggest hits the company conceived for the studio.

in 1983, the company produced its 3D film Spacehunter: Adventures in the Forbidden Zone with the Canadian studio Cinépix, for Columbia Pictures, and became the company's most expensive flop at that time, being overcrowded by the success of Star Wars: Return of the Jedi.

Afterwards, he was granted attention to Universal Pictures, by directing three biggest films Legal Eagles, Twins and Kindergarten Cop.

The logo as Northern Lights Entertainment

After the success of Twins, the company signed a production deal with Universal Pictures, and it was renamed to Northern Lights Entertainment, which unlike Ivan Reitman Productions, was named, which was named for the aurora Northern Lights in the Arctic region.

The company's first films produced under the production name were Stop! Or My Mom Will Shoot and Beethoven. The success gave Northern Lights the decision to produce a sequel Beethoven's 2nd, and it became a hit. In 1993, the company purchased the rights to the Inspector Gadget cartoon to adapt into film for Universal Pictures, but it was never realized after Disney bought out DIC Entertainment.

In 1994, the company developed its first primetime television pilot First Gentlemen, but it eventually never went to series. The company teamed up with Universal Cartoon Studios to do a cartoon version of the Beethoven films, called Beethoven: The Animated Series. In 1997, the company ended its production deal with Universal Pictures in hopes of seeking a new deal.

=== The Montecito Picture Company (1998-present) ===
In 1998, it was renamed to and registered as The Montecitco Picture Company, and hired Universal executive Tom Pollock, who was studio chief when the company was Northern Lights Entertainment, to run the company along with Ivan Reitman.

Under the new Montecitco banner, the company was originally started off with a deal at PolyGram Filmed Entertainment, and the deal called on for the financing and producing of several motion pictures and it was intended for 3 to 5 pictures.

Ultimately, the deal collapsed after Universal Pictures (which Pollock previously ran from 1986 to 1996) took control of PolyGram's assets and Montecito signed a first look deal with DreamWorks Pictures instead in 1999. The deal ended up being renewed in 2000. On March 9, 2000, it extended its pact with writer/director Todd Phillips, after the success of the hit movie Road Trip.

In 2006, the company signed a financing deal with Merrill Lynch to form a new financing company to supply Montecito, Cold Spring Pictures.

After several years at DreamWorks, on February 18, 2009, the company signed a first-look deal with Paramount Pictures. The deal ended on March 16, 2013, and in 2015, the company moved into offices on the Sony lot. Tom Pollock, who worked with the company since 1998, died in August 2020, and Ivan Reitman died in February 2022.

== Filmography ==
Year	Title	Director	Co-produced by	Distributed by
as Ivan Reitman Productions
1978	National Lampoon's Animal House	John Landis	Matty Simmons Productions	Universal Pictures
1981	Heavy Metal	Gerald Potterton	Guardian Trust Company/Canadian Film Development Corporation/Famous Players/Potterton Productions	Columbia Pictures
1981	Stripes	Ivan Reitman		Columbia Pictures
1983	Spacehunter: Adventures in the Forbidden Zone	Lamont Johnson	Cinépix	Columbia Pictures
1984	Ghostbusters	Ivan Reitman	Black Rhino Productions/The Brillstein Company	Columbia Pictures
1986	Legal Eagles	Ivan Reitman		Universal Pictures
1987	Big Shots	Robert Mandel	Lorimar Film Entertainment	20th Century Fox
1988	Casual Sex?	Geneviève Robert		Universal Pictures
1988	Feds	Dan Goldberg		Warner Bros. Pictures
1988	Twins	Ivan Reitman		Universal Pictures
1989	Ghostbusters II	Ivan Reitman	Black Rhino Productions/The Brillstein Company	Columbia Pictures
1990	Kindergarten Cop	Ivan Reitman	Imagine Entertainment	Universal Pictures
as Northern Lights Entertainment
1992	Stop! Or My Mom Will Shoot	Roger Spottiswoode		Universal Pictures
1992	Beethoven	Brian Levant		Universal Pictures
1993	Dave	Ivan Reitman		Warner Bros. Pictures
1993	Beethoven's 2nd	Rod Daniel		Universal Pictures
1994	Junior	Ivan Reitman		Universal Pictures
1996	The Late Shift	Betty Thomas	HBO Pictures	HBO
1996	Space Jam	Joe Pytka	Warner Bros. Feature Animation/David Falk-Ken Ross Productions	Warner Bros. Pictures
1997	Private Parts	Betty Thomas	Rysher Entertainment	Paramount Pictures
1997	Commandments	Daniel Taplitz	Gramercy Pictures	Universal Pictures
1997	Father's Day	Ivan Reitman	Silver Pictures	Warner Bros. Pictures
1998	Six Days, Seven Nights	Ivan Reitman	Touchstone Pictures/Caravan Pictures/Roger Birnbaum Productions	Buena Vista Pictures
as The Montecito Picture Company
2000	Road Trip	Todd Phillips		DreamWorks Pictures
2001	Evolution	Ivan Reitman		DreamWorks Pictures; Columbia Pictures
2002	Killing Me Softly	Chen Kaige		Metro-Goldwyn-Mayer Pictures (straight-to-video)
2003	Old School	Todd Phillips		DreamWorks Pictures
2004	EuroTrip	Jeff Schaffer		DreamWorks Pictures
2006	Trailer Park Boys: The Movie	Mike Clattenburg	Trailer Park Productions	Alliance Atlantis; Screen Media Films
2007	Disturbia	D. J. Caruso	Cold Spring Pictures	DreamWorks Pictures; Paramount Pictures
2009	Hotel for Dogs	Thor Freudenthal	Nickelodeon Movies/Cold Spring Pictures/The Donners Company	DreamWorks Pictures; Paramount Pictures
2009	The Uninvited	The Guard Brothers	Cold Spring Pictures/Vertigo Entertainment	DreamWorks Pictures; Paramount Pictures
2009	I Love You, Man	John Hamburg	De Line Pictures	DreamWorks Pictures; Paramount Pictures
2009	Post Grad	Vicky Jenson	Fox Atomic/Cold Spring Pictures	20th Century Fox
2009	Up in the Air	Jason Reitman	Cold Spring Pictures	Paramount Pictures
2009	Chloe	Atom Egoyan		Sony Pictures Classics; StudioCanal
2011	No Strings Attached	Ivan Reitman	Cold Spring Pictures/Spyglass Entertainment	Paramount Pictures
2012	Hitchcock	Sacha Gervasi	Cold Spring Pictures	Fox Searchlight Pictures
2014	Draft Day	Ivan Reitman	OddLot Entertainment	Summit Entertainment
2016	Ghostbusters	Paul Feig	Village Roadshow Pictures/LStar Capital/Pascal Pictures/Feigco Entertainment	Columbia Pictures
2017	Baywatch	Seth Gordon	Uncharted/Contrafilm/Vinson Pictures/Flynn Picture Company/Seven Bucks Productions	Paramount Pictures
2017	Father Figures	Lawrence Sher	Alcon Entertainment	Warner Bros. Pictures
2020	A Babysitter's Guide to Monster Hunting	Rachel Talalay	Walden Media	Netflix
2020	Godmothered	Sharon Maguire	Walt Disney Pictures	Disney+
2021	Ghostbusters: Afterlife	Jason Reitman	Ghost Corps/Bron Creative	Columbia Pictures

== Television series ==
Year	Title	Creator(s) / Developer(s)	Co-produced by	Network
as Ivan Reitman Productions
1979	Delta House	Douglas Kenney/Harold Ramis/Chris Miller	Matty Simmons Productions/Universal Television	ABC
as Northern Lights Entertainment
1994	Beethoven	Joe Ansolabehere	Universal Cartoon Studios	CBS
1997	Mummies Alive!	Louis Gassin	DIC Entertainment, L.P./Claster Television Incorporated	First-run syndication
as The Montecito Picture Company
2001–2002	Alienators: Evolution Continues	Louis Gassin	DIC Entertainment, L.P./DreamWorks Television/Columbia TriStar Television/Dentsu, Inc.	Fox Kids
