= Tom Pollock =

American film producer (1943–2020)

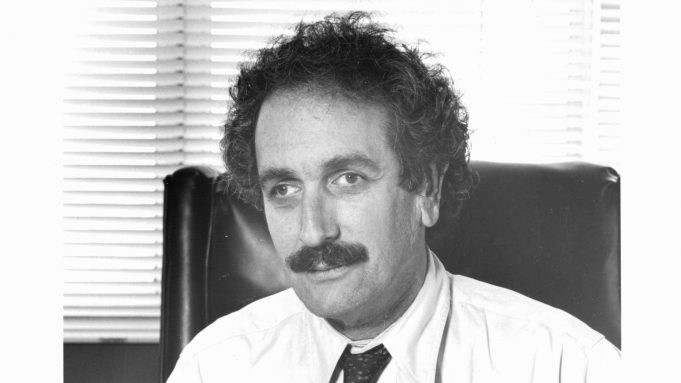
- Born: Thomas Philip Pollock; April 10, 1943; Los Angeles, California, U.S.
- Died: August 1, 2020 (aged 77); Los Angeles, California, U.S.
- Occupations: Attorney; business executive; film producer
- Years active: 1968–2020
- Children: 3

Thomas Philip Pollock (April 10, 1943 – August 1, 2020) was an American film producer and studio executive. He started his career as an entertainment lawyer, before transitioning to a studio executive and film producer. He was the chairman of the board of trustees of the American Film Institute, an adjunct professor of film at the University of California, Santa Barbara, a trustee of the Los Angeles Music Center and a member of the California Bar Association. He was also co-owner of The Montecito Picture Company.

== Early life ==
Thomas Philip Pollock was born on April 10, 1943, in Los Angeles, California, the son of Helene (née Zalk) and Dr. Joseph Pollock. He has two siblings: Ken Pollock and Margo Pollock Sinclair. His family is Jewish. He attended The Happy Valley School, now named Besant Hill School, in Ojai, California, which his maternal grandfather Louis Zalk helped establish. Pollock graduated with a B.A. with distinction from Stanford University in 1964. He went on to the Columbia University School of Law, where he was a Harlan Fiske Stone scholar, served as editor of the Law Review and received a J.D. in 1967.

== Career ==
Pollock started his career in 1968 as an assistant to George Stevens, founding director of the American Film Institute (AFI). In 1969, Pollock became manager of business affairs for AFI's new film school, the Center for Advanced Film Studies. In 1970, he started the entertainment law firm Pollock, Rigrod, and Bloom which later became Pollock, Bloom and Dekom (now Bloom Hergott). Having started the firm with no established clients, Pollock recruited film students from both AFI and elsewhere. Among his first clients was George Lucas. At the time, Lucas was working on THX 1138, and Pollock negotiated the famous deal that secured Lucas the merchandising and sequel rights to Star Wars. In addition to the Star Wars' franchise, Pollock was instrumental in initiating production of the Indiana Jones and Superman franchises. By the 1980s, Pollock, Bloom and Dekom was one of the premier entertainment firms in Los Angeles.

In September 1986, Pollock left his firm to serve as executive vice president of MCA Inc. and chairman of its motion picture group, Universal Pictures. During his tenure, Universal released over 200 films that grossed in excess of $10 billion worldwide, including Jurassic Park (the then highest-grossing film of all time), the Back to the Future trilogy, Do the Right Thing, Fried Green Tomatoes, Backdraft, Twins, Cape Fear, Parenthood, The Flintstones, Kindergarten Cop, Beethoven and Beethoven's 2nd, Casper, Waterworld, Sneakers, Lorenzo's Oil, and Casino.

While Pollock was at the helm of Universal, the studio earned seven Academy Award Best Picture Nominations, including Schindler's List, which won the Academy Award for Best Picture in 1993. Other Best Picture nominees included Field of Dreams, Born on the Fourth of July, Scent of a Woman, In the Name of the Father, Apollo 13 and Babe. Pollock was responsible for bringing numerous creative talents to the studio including Ron Howard and Brian Grazer, Ivan Reitman, Martin Scorsese, Spike Lee, George Miller, Jon Avnet, Martin Brest, Rob Cohen, Phil Alden Robinson, Jim Sheridan, Larry Gordon and James Cameron.

Pollock was a member of the board of directors of MCA INC. and its affiliate Cineplex-Odeon Corporation. He played a key role in the creation of United Cinemas International (UCI), a joint venture with Paramount Pictures, which has become the largest exhibitor outside North America, with nearly 700 multiplex screens. He also formed Gramercy Pictures, now known as Focus Features, with PolyGram in 1992. During his tenure as vice chairman, Pollock also forged MCA's alliance with DreamWorks SKG and the interactive arcade venture GameWorks among Sega, DreamWorks and MCA.

In 1995, following the sale of MCA to the Seagram Co, Pollock became vice chairman of MCA/Universal Studios. He resigned from this position in March 1996, after serving as the entertainment company's top film executive for nine years. Following his resignation, Pollock taught in the Film Studies Program at the University of California, Santa Barbara; and the Pollock family endorsed the Pollock Theater at UCSB, a state-of-the-art screening venue that moderates discussions with filmmakers, critics, and scholars.

In the meantime, Pollock also returned to AFI as a member of its board of trustees. He became chairman of the board in 1996; and during his tenure, AFI produced its 100 Years...100 Movies TV show and started the AFI Awards. He served as vice chairman of the AFI Board of directors and as chair of the AFI Awards film jury.

In 1998, Pollock – together with director/producer Ivan Reitman – founded The Montecito Picture Company, as a reinvention of Reitman's Northern Lights Entertainment, who had a contract with Pollock, which has produced – among others – Road Trip; Old School; Disturbia; the Academy Award Best Picture Nominee Up in the Air; I Love You, Man; Chloe; No Strings Attached; Hitchcock; Draft Day; Baywatch; and Father Figures. He was also an executive producer on Sony's Ghostbusters: Answer the Call and Ghostbusters: Afterlife.

== Personal life ==
Pollock lived in Malibu, California with his dog, Wednesday. He has three children, Alexandra Pollock Gagerman, Allegra Pollock Brandano, and Luke Pollock, and four grandchildren: Haley Gagerman, Ben Gagerman, Amelia Brandano, and Owen Brandano.

Pollock died from a heart attack at Cedars-Sinai Medical Center on August 1, 2020, at age 77.

== Filmography ==
Year	Film	Notes
2000	Road Trip	Executive Producer
2002	Killing Me Softly	Executive Producer
2003	Old School	Executive Producer
2004	EuroTrip	Executive Producer
2006	Trailer Park Boys: The Movie	Executive Producer
2007	Disturbia	Executive Producer
2009	Hotel for Dogs	Executive Producer
2009	The Uninvited	Executive Producer
2009	I Love You, Man	Executive Producer
2009	Post Grad	Executive Producer
2009	Up in the Air	Executive Producer
2009	Chloe	Executive Producer
2011	No Strings Attached	Executive Producer
2012	Hitchcock	Producer
2014	Draft Day	Executive Producer
2016	Ghostbusters: Answer the Call	Executive Producer
2017	Baywatch	Executive Producer
2017	Father Figures	Executive Producer
2020	A Babysitter's Guide to Monster Hunting	Executive Producer
2021	Ghostbusters: Afterlife	Executive Producer
