= Beethoven (TV series) =

American animated TV series

- Genre: Comedy
- Based on: Beethoven by: Edmond Dantès; Amy Holden Jones
- Voices of: Dean Jones; J. D. Daniels; Bill Fagerbakke; Brian George; Tress MacNeille; Joel Murray; Joe Pantoliano; Francesca Marie Smith; Kath Soucie; Nicholle Tom; Maurice LaMarche
- Theme music composer: Christopher Neal Nelson; Keith Baxter
- Opening theme: "Beethoven", performed by Geno Henderson
- Composers: William Anderson; Michael Tavera; Christopher Neal Nelson
- Country of origin: United States
- Original language: English
- No. of seasons: 1
- No. of episodes: 13

Production
- Executive producers: Ivan Reitman; Michael C. Gross; Joe Medjuck; Daniel Goldberg
- Producers: Paul Germain; Roy Smith
- Running time: 22 minutes
- Production companies: Northern Lights Entertainment; Universal Cartoon Studios

Original release
- Network: CBS
- Release: September 10 – December 3, 1994

Beethoven is a 1994 American Saturday morning cartoon television series loosely based on the 1992 motion picture of the same name. The series was produced by Northern Lights Entertainment and Universal Cartoon Studios, and aired for one season on CBS Saturday Mornings, with 13 episodes with two 10 minute segments produced. Dean Jones, who played Dr. Varnick in the film, voiced the role of George Newton. Nicholle Tom, who played teenage daughter Ryce in the film and Beethoven's 2nd, was the only cast member from the films to reprise her role in the series, partly due to her presence in CBS's own prime time series, The Nanny, in where she was contractually obliged to portray the Maggie Sheffield character.

== Premise ==
The Newton family love Beethoven, their St. Bernard dog, but the father, George, has his moments with Beethoven, who gets in different mishaps time after time. When not with the Newton family, Beethoven spends time with three other dogs, Sparky (the stray from the first film), Ginger, and Caesar.

Unlike the films (except Beethoven's Christmas Adventure and Beethoven's Treasure Tail), Beethoven has a speaking voice, at least among the other animals. The same plot was used in another animated series, Free Willy, where the main character also could talk.

== Cast ==
- Dean Jones as George Newton
- J.D. Daniels as Ted Newton
- Bill Fagerbakke as Caesar the Great Dane
- Brian George as Mr. Huggs, Ted's anxious Guinea pig who almost never agree's to leave his cage
- Tress MacNeille as Ginger the Collie
- Joel Murray as Beethoven, the dog named after the German composer Ludwig van Beethoven.
- Joe Pantoliano as Sparky, the Jack Russel Terrier/Dachshund Mix an Energetic yet Snarky Stray who's suspicious about Human Behavior and Human Appliances
- Francesca Marie Smith as Emily Newton
- Kath Soucie as Alice Newton
- Nicholle Tom as Ryce Newton
- Maurice LaMarche as Doberman

=== Additional voices ===
- René Auberjonois
- Hank Azaria as Killer the Poodle
- Gregg Berger as Mailman
- Mark Campbell
- Dan Castellaneta as Blind Shep (in "Scent of a Mutt")
- Christine Cavanaugh as Rosebud (in "Cyrano de Beethoven")
- Brian Cummings
- E.G. Daily as Peanut (in "Puppy Time")
- Stephen DeStefano
- Paul Dooley
- David Doyle as Blind Shep (episode "The Mighty Cone-Dog")
- Jess Harnell as Singing Donut (in "The Big One")
- Bill Henderson
- Dana Hill as Timmy (in "The Kindergarten Caper")
- Tony Jay as Watson (in "Scent of a Mutt")
- Scott Menville
- Art Metrano
- Tim Neil
- John Schuck
- Pamela Segall
- Justin Shenkarow as Roger (in "Mr. Huggs Wild Ride")

== Crew ==
- Paul Germain - producer, story editor and voice director

== Production ==
In March 1994, it was announced Universal Animation Studios would be producing an animated series based on Beethoven for broadcast on CBS in Fall of that year.

== Episodes ==
No.	Title	Written by	Original release date
1	"Good Old George" "The Pound"	Joe Ansolabehere & Paul Germain	September 10, 1994
When Sparky accidentally messes up Beethoven's ball which helps him sleep, Beethoven tries to go in George's room to sleep with him, Much to his master's dismay. / When Sparky gets caught by the Dog Catcher, Beethoven and his Pals attempt to break him out.
2	"Dog Dreams" "The Good, the Bad, and the Poodle"	Joe Ansolabehere Jonathan Greenberg	September 17, 1994
When a group of bad dogs terrorize the dogs in the neighborhood, Beethoven, Mr. Huggs and his friends try to stand up for themselves and run them out of town. / The Newton Family has random dreams about Beethoven.
3	"The Experiment" "The Incredibly Pointless Journey"	Jonathan Greenberg Michael Ferris	September 24, 1994
4	"The Guard Dog" "Mr. Huggs' Wild Ride"	Buddy Chuck Peter Gaffney	October 1, 1994
5	"Cat Fight" "The Kindergarten Caper"	Jonathan Greenberg Peter Gaffney	October 8, 1994
6	"The Gopher Who Would Be King" "Pet Psychiatrist"	Jim Bernstein & Michael Shipley Buddy Chuck	October 15, 1994
7	"Cyrano de Beethoven" "The Mailman Cometh"	Paul Germain Joe Ansolabehere & Jonathan Greenberg	October 22, 1994
8	"A Cat Named Rover" "The Dog Must Diet"	Buddy Chuck Jonathan Greenberg	October 29, 1994
9	"Car Trouble" "The Mighty Cone-Dog"	Buddy Chuck Joe Ansolabehere	November 5, 1994
10	"Puppy Time" "The Morning Paper"	Joe Ansolabehere & Jonathan Greenberg Michael Ferris	November 12, 1994
11	"The Big One" "Fleas!"	Joe Ansolabehere Jeff Lowell	November 19, 1994
12	"Scent of a Mutt" "Down on the Farm"	Jonathan Greenberg Michael Ferris	November 26, 1994
13	"Trash Island" "Long Weekend"	Christian Fletcher Joe Ansolabehere & Jonathan Greenberg	December 3, 1994

== Home release ==
Universal and Gaiam released episodes of the show on VHS. In July 2020, the series became available on the Peacock streaming service.
