= Beethoven's 5th (film) =

- DVD cover
- Directed by: Mark Griffiths
- Written by: Cliff Ruby; Elana Lesser
- Based on: Beethoven by Edmond Dantès; Amy Holden Jones
- Produced by: Mike Elliot
- Starring: Dave Thomas; Faith Ford; Daveigh Chase; Tom Poston; Katherine Helmond; Sammy Kahn; Richard Riehle; Clint Howard; Kathy Griffin; John Larroquette
- Cinematography: Christopher Baffa
- Edited by: John Gilbert
- Music by: Adam Berry
- Distributed by: Universal Studios Home Video
- Release date: December 2, 2003
- Running time: 90 minutes
- Country: United States
- Language: English

Beethoven's 5th is a 2003 American family comedy film and is the fifth installment in the Beethoven film series. The film was released direct-to-video by Universal Studios Home Video on December 2, 2003.

The cast was completely renewed for this film. Daveigh Chase takes over the role of Sara, which was originally played by Michaela Gallo in the previous two films.

It was also the final film of the original series, as the 2008 film, Beethoven's Big Break was a reboot of the character.

== Plot ==
When Sara Newton and Beethoven are sent to spend the summer with Sara's maternal uncle, clumsy mechanic Freddy Kablinski (her mom's brother) in an old mining town called Quicksilver, the mischievous Beethoven "digs up" a clue to the whereabouts of the legendary, hidden fortune of two bank robbers named Moe and Rita Selig. Now everyone wants to be his best friend as his discovery unleashes a frenzy of treasure hunting among the community's creatures. With help from Uncle Freddy and a boy named Garrett, Sara and Beethoven try to help uncover a secret that has been in the little town for years. Then after the secret is uncovered, a criminal tries to steal it away before he gets arrested by Sheriff Julie. Beethoven shoots dead the ghosts and is "declared" a hero.

== Cast ==
- Dave Thomas as Freddy Kablinski
- Faith Ford as Sheriff Julie Dempsey
- Daveigh Chase as Sara Newton
- Tom Poston as John Giles/Selig
- Katherine Helmond as Cora Wilkens
- Sammy Kahn as Garrett
- Richard Riehle as Vaughn Carter
- Clint Howard as Owen Tuttle
- Kathy Griffin as Evie Kling
- John Larroquette as Mayor Harold Herman
- Rodman Flender as Moe Selig
- Tina Illman as Rita Selig
- Tom Musgrave as Jim
- Joel Hurt Jones as Phil Dobson
- Elizabeth Warner as Mrs. Dobson
- J.S. Barque as Beethoven

== Release ==
The film was released direct-to-video on December 2, 2003, in the United States and in May 2004 in the United Kingdom.
