= Beethoven's 3rd (film) =

2000 film by David M. Evans

- DVD cover
- Directed by: David Mickey Evans
- Written by: Jeff Schechter
- Based on: Beethoven by Edmond Dantès; Amy Holden Jones
- Produced by: David Bixler; Kelli Konop
- Starring: Judge Reinhold; Julia Sweeney; Michaela Gallo; Joe Pichler; Michael Ciccolini; Jamie Marsh; Frank Gorshin; Danielle Weiner
- Cinematography: John B. Aronson
- Edited by: Harry Keramidas
- Music by: Philip Giffin
- Production company: Universal Family & Home Entertainment
- Distributed by: Universal Studios Home Video
- Release date: July 25, 2000
- Running time: 99 minutes
- Country: United States
- Language: English

Beethoven's 3rd is a 2000 American comedy film and the third installment in the Beethoven film series. It is the first film in the series to be released directly to video and to receive a G rating from the Motion Picture Association of America. The film marks the onscreen introduction of Judge Reinhold as George Newton's younger brother Richard (first mentioned in the original film), Julia Sweeney as Richard's wife Beth, Joe Pichler as Richard's son Brennan, and Michaela Gallo as Richard's daughter Sara.

Beethoven's 3rd was released by Universal Studios Home Video on July 25, 2000.

== Plot ==
Richard Newton, George's brother, prepares for a road trip from Denver, Colorado, to a Newton family reunion in California with his wife Beth and children Sara and Brennan. He models the entire vacation based on a memorable family road trip from his childhood in 1967, and rents a large, state-of-the-art RV for the occasion. Before the family leaves, they receive a cage from George containing Beethoven, who Richard's family is supposed to deliver to California as Beethoven's owners are stuck in Europe. Beth and Brennan disapprove of the plan, and Beth convinces Richard to leave Beethoven at a dog kennel until George can retrieve him.

Meanwhile, criminal hackers Tommy and William visit a video rental shop in an attempt to buy a DVD of The Shakiest Gun in the West, having previously hidden a stolen computer code on it for an unknown party, only to learn that Richard has already bought it for the trip. After obtaining Richard's address, Tommy and William drive to the house and spy on them; their bumbling antics catches Beethoven's attention before the Newton family leaves with him. Beethoven is dropped off at the kennel, but after spotting Tommy and William tailing the Newtons, he escapes and stows away on the RV's boat trailer when the vehicle briefly stops. Beethoven is later discovered by Richard when the family reaches their first destination, and Beth reluctantly agrees to bring him along for the rest of the trip.

The road trip is plagued by several mishaps in which Beethoven causes the Newtons problems and forces Richard to pay for any instances of damage caused by the St. Bernard. Unbeknownst to them, all of the mishaps were started by Tommy and William's constant attempts at stealing the DVD, with Beethoven causing the damages in the process of protecting the Newtons. Meanwhile, Brennan begins to bond with Beethoven after Beethoven allows him to socialize with a girl using the same trip route as him. During one stop, William bashes the RV's windshield by throwing a brick through it while the Newtons are away, with the damage being blamed on Beethoven. Finally, Richard snaps and admits that his childhood road trip was actually terrible, but that he had been praising it in an effort to forget how terrible it was.

While staying the night at a hotel that doesn't allow pets, Sara decides to sleep with Beethoven in the RV. The next day, Tommy and William, at this point mentally unbalanced from their encounters with Beethoven, break into the RV and steal it with Beethoven and Sara still inside. Brennan sees this, alerts Richard and Beth to Tommy and William's presence who then call the cops with Richard hopping in a police car with an officer to follow Tommy and William. During the chaos, William accidentally knocks himself out with a homemade sedative designed for Beethoven. Tommy subdues Beethoven and attempts to grab Sara, but Sara successfully orders Beethoven to sit on an emergency brake button. This stops the still-moving RV and sends Tommy dangling out of the broken windshield. Afterwards, Sara is reunited with the rest of the Newtons, Tommy and William are both arrested, and the DVD with the stolen computer code is confiscated. Beth admits she was wrong about Beethoven and realized that he truly was protecting the family all along.

The Newtons arrive at the family reunion, despondent at the prospect of giving Beethoven back to George. They find out from Richard's Uncle Morrie that George and his family will not be attending the reunion because of unexpected business problems in Slovakia, which means they have to watch over Beethoven for a whole year, with George promising to pay for everything. Then, to Beth's despair, Morrie tells the Newtons to bring two more St. Bernards along when they drive back home.

== Cast ==
- Judge Reinhold as Richard Newton, George's younger brother
- Julia Sweeney as Beth Newton, Richard's wife
- Joe Pichler as Brennan Newton, Richard & Beth's son
- Michaela Gallo as Sara Newton, Richard & Beth's daughter
- Mike Ciccolini (as Michael Ciccolini) as Tommy
- Jamie Marsh as Bill (William)
- Danielle Keaton (as Danielle Weiner) as Penny, Brennan's love interest
- Frank Gorshin as Morrie Newton, Richard's paternal uncle
- Holly Mitchell as Kennel Employee
- Greg Pitts as Quentin, video store clerk.
- Cujo as Beethoven

== Reception ==
On Rotten Tomatoes the film has a score of 0% based on reviews from 7 critics.
