= Beethoven's 4th (film) =

2001 film by David Mickey Evans

- DVD cover
- Directed by: David Mickey Evans
- Written by: John Loy
- Based on: Beethoven by: Edmond Dantès; Amy Holden Jones
- Produced by: Kelli Konop
- Starring: Judge Reinhold; Julia Sweeney; Michaela Gallo; Joe Pichler; Matt McCoy; Veanne Cox; Art LaFleur; Dorien Wilson; Dr. Joyce Brothers; Kaleigh Krish; Mark Lindsay Chapman; Nick Meaney; Patrick Bristow
- Cinematography: John B. Aronson
- Edited by: Carroll Timothy O'Meara
- Music by: Philip Giffin
- Production company: Universal Family & Home Entertainment
- Distributed by: Universal Studios Home Video
- Release date: December 4, 2001
- Running time: 93 minutes
- Country: United States
- Language: English

Beethoven's 4th is a 2001 American direct to video comedy film. It is the third sequel to the 1992 film Beethoven and the fourth installment in the Beethoven film series. It was released by Universal Studios Home Video on December 4, 2001. It is the last film to feature Judge Reinhold as Richard Newton, Julia Sweeney as Beth Newton, Joe Pichler as Brennan Newton, and Michaela Gallo as Sara Newton.

== Plot ==
Richard Newton checks in with his two children, Sara and Brennan, before school. Richard and his family are still watching Beethoven while Richard's brother George and his family are still out of town for business. The children love their St. Bernard dog, Beethoven, whom they are keeping for relatives, but their parents do not, and want to get rid of him. The children begin taking the dog to Obedience Training led by a former army sergeant. Brennan falls in love with a girl named Hayley, while Beethoven literally destroys the obstacle course in one day. To top it all off, Beethoven hits the army sergeant in the groin with a leash causing him to kneel over in pain.

Meanwhile, the rich Sedgewick family owns a pampered and well-behaved St. Bernard that looks exactly like Beethoven, named Michelangelo. Michelangelo and young Madison Sedgewick are friends, but her busy parents, Reginald and Martha, are always neglecting her. In fact, Reginald is the only one who seems to try to play with her. Beethoven, meanwhile, runs after a loose hot dog cart, and ends up on a merry-go-round. Michelangelo has gotten loose, as well, and is now on the same merry-go-round. Brennan and Sara mistake him for Beethoven and take him home. The real Beethoven is mistaken for Michelangelo, and grabbed by Jonathan Simmons, the Sedgewick family's butler and taken to their mansion.

Sara is surprised when Michelangelo wipes his feet on the welcome mat and folds the napkins with his teeth at dinner. The Sedgewicks notice the change in "their dog" too, when he bolts Simmons to the ground to get a piece of turkey. That night, Beethoven hears Madison whimpering because of a bad dream, and comforts her. At the next obedience class, Michelangelo leaves everyone in astonishment, by finishing the entire new obstacle course, while the sergeant is announcing the course.

Meanwhile, Beethoven ruins a dinner party, when a man named Nigel tries to dognap him. A therapist points out to Martha that the reason "Michelangelo" is acting this way is because he is the first one exhibiting "symptoms". The therapist suggests that it may be because Martha does not care about anyone but herself. Richard is concerned about "Beethoven", and starts acting out to get "Beethoven" to misbehave again too. Richard drinks toilet water, chases the mailman, etc. Michelangelo ends up catching on, and starts behaving like Beethoven.

The Sedgewick family start playing fetch and swimming with Beethoven, but as the Sedgewicks and Beethoven are hiking, Nigel (who turns out to be Simmons' sidekick) kidnaps Beethoven and locks him in a warehouse, for a ransom of $250,000. Beethoven breaks out and secretly switches places with Michelangelo at the obedience graduation. The real Michelangelo is found by the Sedgewicks, and Simmons and Nigel are arrested by two FBI agents. The real Beethoven is found by the Newtons and he graduates. The Sedgewicks and Newtons then meet up at a fork on the road, though, they never find out about the switching of Beethoven and Michelangelo.

== Cast ==
- Judge Reinhold as Richard Newton
- Julia Sweeney as Beth Newton, Richard's wife
- Joe Pichler as Brennan Newton, Richard & Beth's son
- Michaela Gallo as Sara Newton, Richard & Beth's daughter
- Kaleigh Krish as Madison Sedgewick, the daughter of Reginald & Martha
- Matt McCoy as Reginald Sedgewick, Madison's father
- Veanne Cox as Martha Sedgewick, Madison's mother
- Jeff Coopwood as Bill
- Dorien Wilson as Marlowe
- Mark Lindsay Chapman as Jonathan "Johnnie" Simmons
- Nick Meaney as Nigel Bigalow
- Natalie Elizabeth Marston as Hayley
- Art LaFleur as Sergeant Rutledge
- June Lu as Mrs. Florence Rutledge
- Patrick Bristow as Guillermo
- Joyce Brothers as herself
- Cujo as Beethoven / Michelangelo

== Reception ==
On Rotten Tomatoes the film has a score of 0% based on reviews from 8 critics.
