= Joe Medjuck =

Canadian film producer

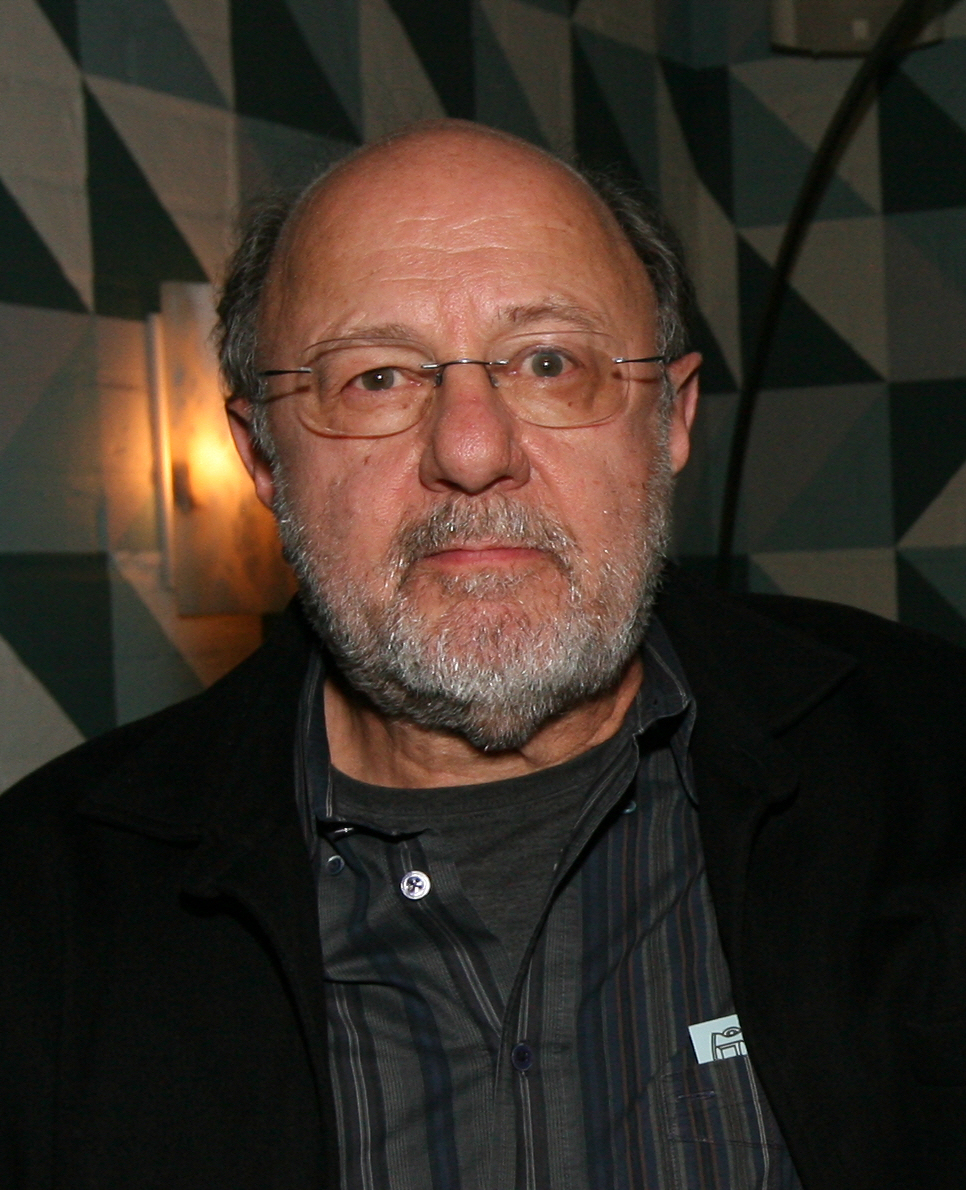
- Medjuck on March 6, 2012
- Born: February 17, 1943 (age 83); Fredericton, New Brunswick, Canada
- Occupation: Film producer

Joseph Medjuck (born February 17, 1943) is a Canadian film producer in Hollywood.

== Life and career ==
Medjuck was born in Fredericton, New Brunswick, Canada. He received his BA in Honours English from McGill University and his MA and PhD from the University of Toronto where he taught for 12 years and founded the Cinema Studies Program at Innis College.

While teaching at University of Toronto Medjuck also worked as a journalist for the film magazine Take One, Canadian Forum, The Times Literary Supplement, The Canadian Broadcasting Corporation and TVOntario.

Often working with Ivan Reitman, his producing credits include the films Stripes, Heavy Metal, Ghostbusters, Legal Eagles, Twins, Beethoven, Kindergarten Cop, Dave, Junior, Commandments, Father’s Day, Private Parts, Space Jam, Six Days, Seven Nights, Road Trip, Old School, Eurotrip, Disturbia, Chloe, Up in the Air, No Strings Attached, Hitchcock and Draft Day.

In television, his producing credits include the cartoon shows The Real Ghostbusters, Beethoven and Mummies Alive! as well as the Emmy nominated HBO film The Late Shift.

Medjuck was one of the founders of The Criterion Collection. He lives in Montecito, California with his wife Laurie Deans.
