= Jennifer Finnigan =

Canadian actress (born 1979)

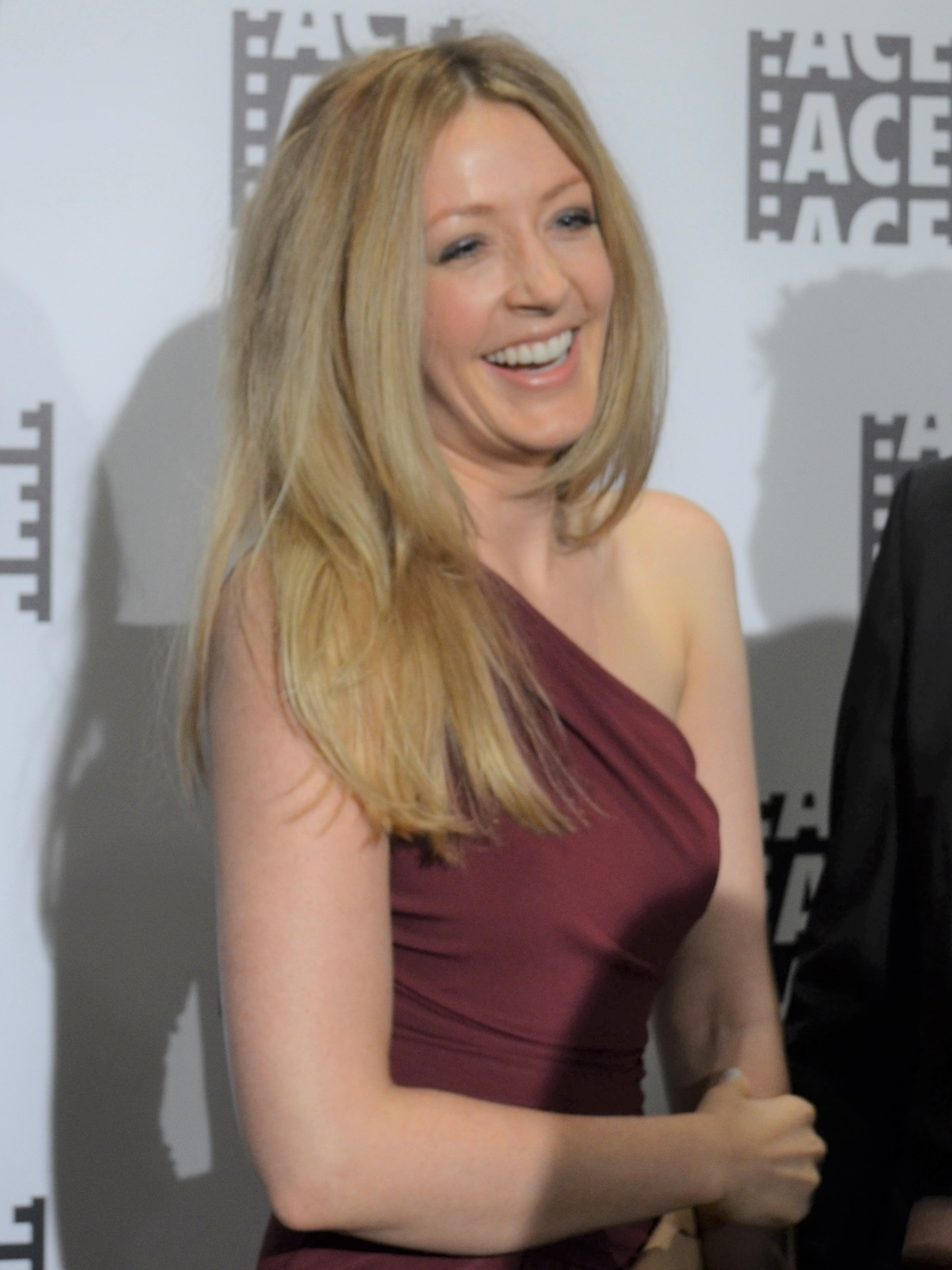
- Finnigan in 2012
- Born: Jennifer Christina Finnigan; August 22, 1979 (age 47); Montreal, Quebec, Canada
- Occupation: Actress
- Years active: 1996–present
- Spouse: Jonathan Silverman (m. 2007)
- Children: 1

Jennifer Christina Finnigan (born August 22, 1979) is a Canadian actress. She is known for her role as Bridget Forrester in the American soap opera The Bold and the Beautiful from 2000 to 2004, for which she won three Daytime Emmy Awards for Outstanding Younger Actress in a Drama Series. She also appeared on the CBS legal drama Close to Home (2005–2007) and the ABC sitcom Better with You (2010–2011). Finnigan also starred on the FX series Tyrant (2014–2016). She later starred in the CBS sci-fi drama Salvation (2017–2018).

== Early life and education ==
Finnigan was born in Montreal, Quebec. She is the daughter of Diane Rioux Finnigan, and popular radio personality Jack Finnigan, who was a fixture on CJAD radio in Montreal from 1972 to 2005. She attended The Sacred Heart School of Montreal, a Catholic, all-girl private school from which she graduated in 1996.

== Personal life ==
Finnigan married actor Jonathan Silverman on June 7, 2007, on the island of Mykonos in Greece. She and Silverman have a daughter, Ella Jack, born on September 29, 2017.

== Career ==
=== 1998–2000 ===
From 1998 to 2000, Finnigan appeared in a variety of Canadian shows. In 1998, she made a few guest appearances on "The Mystery Files of Shelby Woo". In early 1999, she appeared in one episode of "Big Wolf on Campus" and throughout the end of 1999, she starred in a sitcom called Student Bodies playing the role of Kim McCloud in the show's final season. Throughout the first half of 2000, she played the character "Tara" in the episode "The Tale of the Last Dance" in Season 7 of Are You Afraid of the Dark?, as well as making a guest appearance on La Femme Nikita.

=== 2000–2004 ===
In mid-2000 Finnigan moved to the United States and got the role of Bridget Forrester on the long-running soap opera The Bold and the Beautiful by July. She portrayed the character over the next four years and won three awards for her work on the show. She is the first person to win three consecutive Daytime Emmy Awards (29th, 30th, 31st Awards), all as "Outstanding Younger Actress". She left the show in January 2004 to pursue other acting roles.

In December 2000 she also starred in the telefilm The Stalking of Laurie Show, about the real-life murder of a young teenage girl.

=== 2004–2005 ===
From March 2004 until November 2004 Finnigan was featured in 10 episodes of Crossing Jordan as pathologist Dr. Devan Maguire. Following her departure from the show, she played the character Marni Fliss on the NBC series Committed, which only aired for 13 episodes before being cancelled due to low ratings. The show ran from January until March 2005. In mid-2005 she made a guest appearance as Alex Sinclair in The Dead Zone episode "Double Vision".

=== 2005–2007 ===
Beginning in the fall of 2005 Finnigan was the star of the CBS television drama series Close to Home, playing a deputy district attorney. In December 2005 while still starring in Close to Home, she made a second guest appearance as Alex Sinclair in the episode "A Very Dead Zone Christmas" of The Dead Zone. Close to Home aired for two seasons before it was cancelled in May 2007. In August 2007 Finnigan made one final guest appearance on The Dead Zone in the episode "Exile" just before the show ended in late 2007.

=== 2008–present ===
Finnigan co-starred with her husband, actor Jonathan Silverman, in Beethoven's Big Break, the latest installment in the Beethoven film series; the film was released direct-to-DVD in late 2008. She also starred in Playing for Keeps, a CTV/Lifetime Original Movie, broadcast as What Color is Love? in the United States. Finnigan was a series regular on the ABC sitcom Better with You, which was cancelled after only one season.

She co-starred alongside Jason Priestley in the Psych sixth-season episode, "Neil Simon's Lover's Retreat". She has also appeared om Shadow Island Mysteries: The Last Christmas and Shadow Island Mysteries: Wedding for One.

In 2013 she starred in the TNT series Monday Mornings on which her real-life husband Jonathan Silverman was a recurring cast member. The series was cancelled after one season.

She also starred in the FX series Tyrant, which premiered on June 24, 2014. Tyrant aired its final episode on September 7, 2016, after a three-season run.

She appeared as Grace Barrows, the Pentagon's press secretary, in the 2017 CBS action drama Salvation. Her character was one of a few people initially informed when the Pentagon learned Earth was going to collide with an asteroid that has the potential for an extinction-level destruction. The series ran for two seasons.

She starred in the 2021 Canadian comedy-drama series Moonshine.

== Filmography ==
=== Film ===
Year	Title	Role	Notes
2006	High Hopes	Morgan	
2008	The Coverup	Nancy Pepper	
2008	Beethoven's Big Break	Lisa	Direct-to-video film
2011	Conception	Laurie	
2014	A Bet's a Bet	Stephanie	
2017	Icky: An American Dog Story	Kool Kitty	
2018	Andover	Dawn Slope	

=== Television ===
Year	Title	Role	Notes
1996	My Hometown	Sylvia	Episode: "I'll Recognize You"
1998	The Mystery Files of Shelby Woo	Christie Sayers	Episodes: "The Egg Mystery", "The Itchy Shorts Mystery", "The Robot Mystery"
1999	Big Wolf on Campus	Vesper	Episode: "Muffy the Werewolf Slayer"
1999–2000	Student Bodies	Kim McCloud	Main role (season 3)
2000	La Femme Nikita	Dory	Episode: "There Are No Missions"
2000	Are You Afraid of the Dark?	Tara Martin	Episode: "The Tale of the Last Dance"
2000	The Stalking of Laurie Show	Laurie Show	Television film
2000–2004	The Bold and the Beautiful	Bridget Forrester	Regular role
2001	Largo Winch	Tamara Ross	Episode: "Cheap Thrills"
2004	Crossing Jordan	Dr. Devan Maguire	Recurring role (seasons 3–4), 10 episodes
2005	The Dead Zone	Alex Sinclair	Episodes: "Double Vision", "A Very Dead Zone Christmas"
2005	Committed	Marni Fliss	Main role
2005–2007	Close to Home	Annabeth Chase	Main role
2007	The Dead Zone	Alex Sinclair	Episode: "Exile"
2009	Inside the Box	Lauren Thomas	Television film
2009	What Color Is Love?	Nicole Alpern	Television film
2010	Wedding for One	Claire La Foret	Television film
2010	The Last Christmas	Claire La Foret	Television film
2010–2011	Better with You	Madeleine "Maddie" Putney	Main role
2011	Psych	Barbie	Episode: "Neil Simon's Lover's Retreat"
2013	Monday Mornings	Dr. Tina Ridgeway	Main role
2013	Baby Sellers	Det. Nic Morrison	Television film
2014	Wild Card	Eliza Evans	Episode: "The Pilot"
2014–2016	Tyrant	Molly	Main role
2015	Angel of Christmas	Susan	Television film
2017	Walking the Dog	Kristie	Television film
2017–2018	Salvation	Grace Barrows	Main role
2018	Welcome to Christmas	Madison Lane	Television film
2021–2023	Moonshine	Lidia Bennett	Main role

== Awards and nominations ==
Year	Award	Category	Work	Result
2002	Daytime Emmy Award	Outstanding Younger Actress in a Drama Series	The Bold and the Beautiful	Won
2003	Daytime Emmy Award	Outstanding Younger Actress in a Drama Series	The Bold and the Beautiful	Won
2004	Daytime Emmy Award	Outstanding Younger Actress in a Drama Series	The Bold and the Beautiful	Won
