= Sheldon Kahn =

American film editor (born 1940)

- Born: Sheldon F. Kahn; March 1, 1940 (age 86)
- Education: University of Southern California
- Occupation: Film editor

Sheldon F. Kahn (born March 1, 1940) is an American film editor and producer. He was jointly awarded the BAFTA Award for Best Editing, with Lynzee Klingman and Richard Chew, for their work on One Flew Over the Cuckoo's Nest.

Kahn graduated from the University of Southern California in 1963.

== Filmography ==
Editor
Year	Film	Director	Notes
1975	One Flew Over the Cuckoo's Nest	Miloš Forman	Co-win for the BAFTA Award for Best Editing
1976	The Great Scout & Cathouse Thursday	Don Taylor	
1976	Mikey and Nicky	Elaine May	
1978	An Enemy of the People	George Schaefer	
1978	Bloodbrothers	Robert Mulligan	First collaboration with Robert Mulligan
1978	Same Time, Next Year	Robert Mulligan	Second collaboration with Robert Mulligan
1979	The Electric Horseman	Sydney Pollack	First collaboration with Sydney Pollack
1980	Private Benjamin	Howard Zieff	First collaboration with Howard Zieff
1981	Absence of Malice	Sydney Pollack	Second collaboration with Sydney Pollack
1982	Kiss Me Goodbye	Robert Mulligan	Third collaboration with Robert Mulligan
1984	Unfaithfully Yours	Howard Zieff	Second collaboration with Howard Zieff
1984	Ghostbusters	Ivan Reitman	First collaboration with Ivan Reitman
1985	Out of Africa	Sydney Pollack	Third collaboration with Sydney Pollack
1986	Legal Eagles	Ivan Reitman	Second collaboration with Ivan Reitman
1987	La Bamba	Luis Valdez	
1987	Big Shots	Robert Mandel	
1988	Casual Sex?	Geneviève Robert	
1988	Twins	Ivan Reitman	Third collaboration with Ivan Reitman
1989	Ghostbusters II	Ivan Reitman	Fourth collaboration with Ivan Reitman
1990	Kindergarten Cop	Ivan Reitman	Fifth collaboration with Ivan Reitman
1992	Beethoven	Brian Levant	
1993	Dave	Ivan Reitman	Sixth collaboration with Ivan Reitman
1993	Beethoven's 2nd	Rod Daniel	
1994	Junior	Ivan Reitman	Seventh collaboration with Ivan Reitman
1996	Space Jam	Joe Pytka	
1997	Fathers' Day	Ivan Reitman	Eighth collaboration with Ivan Reitman
1998	Six Days, Seven Nights	Ivan Reitman	Ninth collaboration with Ivan Reitman
2000	Road Trip	Todd Phillips	
2000	Proof of Life	Taylor Hackford	Second collaboration with Taylor Hackford
2001	Evolution	Ivan Reitman	Tenth collaboration with Ivan Reitman
2003	I'll Be There	Craig Ferguson	
2005	Be Cool	F. Gary Gray	
2006	My Super Ex-Girlfriend	Ivan Reitman	Eleventh collaboration with Ivan Reitman
2009	Hotel for Dogs	Thor Freudenthal	
2014	Draft Day	Ivan Reitman	Twelfth collaboration with Ivan Reitman

Editorial department
Year	Film	Director	Role	Notes
1973	Blume in Love	Paul Mazursky	Assistant film editor	
1973	Cinderella Liberty	Mark Rydell	Assistant film editor	
1991	Sweet Talker	Michael Jenkins	Supervising editor	
1993	Blood In Blood Out	Taylor Hackford	Editorial consultant	First collaboration with Taylor Hackford

Producer
Year	Film	Director	Credit
1986	Legal Eagles	Ivan Reitman	Associate producer
1988	Casual Sex?	Geneviève Robert	Producer
1988	Twins	Ivan Reitman	Associate producer
1989	Ghostbusters II	Ivan Reitman	Associate producer
1990	Kindergarten Cop	Ivan Reitman	Associate producer
1992	Beethoven	Brian Levant	Associate producer
1993	Beethoven's 2nd	Rod Daniel	Associate producer
1994	Junior	Ivan Reitman	Associate producer
1996	Space Jam	Joe Pytka	Co-producer
1997	Fathers' Day	Ivan Reitman	Associate producer
1998	Six Days, Seven Nights	Ivan Reitman	Co-producer
2000	Road Trip	Todd Phillips	Associate producer
2001	Evolution	Ivan Reitman	Associate producer
2003	I'll Be There	Craig Ferguson	Associate producer

Thanks
Year	Film	Director	Role
1995	The Fear	Vincent Robert	The producers wish to thank
2003	Dumb and Dumberer: When Harry Met Lloyd	Troy Miller	Special thanks
2011	Red Dog	Kriv Stenders	Nelson Woss would like to thank

Documentaries

Editor
Year	Film	Director	Notes
1982	Richard Pryor: Live on the Sunset Strip	Joe Layton	Stand-up comedy film

TV movies

Editor
Year	Film	Director
1977	A Circle Street of Children	Don Taylor

Editorial department
Year	Film	Director	Role
1971	Cannon	George McCowan	Assistant editor

TV series

Editor
Year	Title	Notes
1982	Bring 'Em Back Alive	1 episode

== Awards ==
Kahn has been nominated for the following awards:

- Academy Award for Best Film Editing for Out of Africa
- Academy Award for Best Film Editing for One Flew Over the Cuckoo's Nest
- American Cinema Editors Award for Best Edited Feature Film for Out of Africa
- American Cinema Editors Award for Best Edited Feature Film for One Flew Over the Cuckoo's Nest
