= William D. Gordean =

William D. Gordean is an American film editor who has worked since the late 1970s on American feature films and television shows. He was born in 1944 in Los Angeles, and now resides in Maryland's Eastern Shore.

== Filmography ==
Year	Title	Position
1979	Skatetown, U.S.A.	editor
1980	Smokey and the Bandit II	editor
1981	The Cannonball Run	editor
1981	Sharky's Machine	editor
1983	Stroker Ace	editor
1983	Cannonball Run II	editor
1985	Stick	editor
1986	Legal Eagles	editor
1987	Dragnet	editor
1988	The Great Outdoors	editor
1988	Wildfire	editor
1989	The Young Riders	editor, 1 episode
1990	Teenage Mutant Ninja Turtles	editor
1991	Delirious	editor
1992	Beethoven	editor
1993	Teenage Mutant Ninja Turtles III	editor
1993	Beethoven's 2nd	editor
1997	RocketMan	editor
