= Beethoven's Big Break =

- DVD cover
- Directed by: Mike Elliott
- Screenplay by: Derek Rydall
- Story by: Derek Rydall; Brian Levant
- Based on: Beethoven by Edmond Dantès; Amy Holden Jones
- Produced by: Wayne Morris
- Starring: Jonathan Silverman; Jennifer Finnigan; Rhea Perlman; Stephen Tobolowsky; Oscar Nunez; Joey Fatone; Cesar Millan; Moisés Arias; Eddie Griffin
- Cinematography: Stephen F. Campbell
- Edited by: Roderick Davis
- Music by: Robert Folk
- Distributed by: Universal Studios Home Entertainment
- Release date: December 30, 2008
- Running time: 102 minutes
- Country: United States
- Language: English

Beethoven's Big Break (formerly known as Beethoven: The Reel Story and sometimes referred to as Beethoven's 6th) is a 2008 American comedy film and is the sixth installment in the Beethoven series. The film stars Jonathan Silverman, Jennifer Finnigan, Rhea Perlman, Stephen Tobolowsky, Oscar Nunez, Joey Fatone, Cesar Millan, Moises Arias, and Eddie Griffin.

It was released on DVD by Universal Studios Home Entertainment on December 30, 2008. The film could be considered a reboot of the series, as it completely disregards all storylines from the previous five films, though some scenes in this film include references to the original storyline.

== Plot ==
Eddie Thornton is an assistant animal trainer to Sal DeMarco, an untalented, egocentric animal show host. Both men have been hired to train the animals for a film called Frizzy, The Bichon Frise. When Frizzy is kidnapped, Sal blames Eddie. Eddie is promptly fired by producer Patricia. Director Stanley and Patricia refuse to pay the ransom and hold auditions for the new Frizzy.

Meanwhile, Eddie's son, Billy, is walking around town when he discovers a large, stray dog following him. Billy brings the dog home and names him Beethoven when the dog shows interest in Ludwig van Beethoven's 5th symphony. Eddie comes home to discover his house wrecked by an oversized dog.

The one responsible for Frizzy's disappearance is Sal, along with Tick and Bones. Stanley and Patricia have difficulties finding the right dog. Eddie arrives with Billy and Beethoven to pick up his lizard, Pete. Beethoven bursts in and performs a chase scene with Pete the Lizard. Beethoven and Eddie are hired on the spot and Sal is fired.

Eddie is charged with having Beethoven perform stunts in the film, but Beethoven proves to be "untrainable", and instead, crashes through the scene and makes a sloppy mess. Stanley finds these scenes even funnier and has them printed. Lisa, the film's writer, asks to spend more time with Beethoven.

As revenge for being fired, Sal orders his henchmen to kidnap Beethoven. Eddie, Billy, and Lisa head to Sal's show stage and rescue Beethoven. Sal and his goons are arrested, and Eddie and Lisa begin a relationship.

== Cast ==
- Cujo as Beethoven
- Jonathan Silverman as Eddie Thornton "Lizard Guy"
- Jennifer Finnigan as Lisa Waters
- Moises Arias as Billy Thornton
- Eddie Griffin as Stanley Mitchell
- Haley Pullos as Roxy Rose
- Rhea Perlman as Patricia Benji
- Stephen Tobolowsky as Sal DeMarco
- Oscar Nunez as Tick
- Joey Fatone as Bones
- Stefanie Scott as Katie
- Cesar Millan as Himself
- John Augello as Studio Executive
- Grant Elliott as George Newton
- Zach Kosnitzky as Lewis
- Ali Eagle as Craft Service Person
- Adam Vernier as Marco

== Reception ==
Common Sense Media rated it 3 out of 5 stars. Kevin Carr, writing for 7M Pictures said the film "offers plenty of slapstick moments and a fair share of burps and farts, which make the movie a sure-fire hit for young kids".
