= Laurel Cronin =

American actress (1939–92)

- Born: October 10, 1939
- Died: October 26, 1992 (aged 53); Chicago, Illinois, U.S.
- Occupations: Actress, singer, dancer
- Children: 2
- Awards: 1987 Joseph Jefferson Award

Laurel Cronin (October 10, 1939 – October 26, 1992) was an American actress, singer and dancer.

== Biography ==
Cronin was born on October 10, 1939, to Frank and Elizabeth Lewis. She had a son, Christopher, and a daughter, Jennifer. She maintained a residence in Oak Park, Illinois, for twenty years.

Prior to her move to Los Angeles in 1990, Cronin worked thirty-five years of her career in theatre based in Chicago. In 1987, she won the Joseph Jefferson Award for Best Actress for her performance as Mrs. Hardcastle in She Stoops to Conquer at the Court Theatre. In 1980, she also appeared on Broadway in Passione.

On October 26, 1992, Cronin died of cancer at the age of 53 at Northwestern Memorial Hospital.

== Filmography ==
Year	Title	Role	Notes
1991	Hook	Liza, Wendy's Housekeeper	
1992	Beethoven	Devonia Peet	
1992	Housesitter	Mary	
1992	A League of Their Own	Maida Gillespie	(final film role)
