= Draft Day =

2014 film directed by Ivan Reitman

- Theatrical release poster
- Directed by: Ivan Reitman
- Written by: Rajiv Joseph; Scott Rothman
- Produced by: Ivan Reitman; Ali Bell; Joe Medjuck
- Starring: Kevin Costner; Jennifer Garner; Denis Leary; Frank Langella; Sam Elliott; Ellen Burstyn; Chadwick Boseman
- Cinematography: Eric Steelberg
- Edited by: Sheldon Kahn; Dana E. Glauberman
- Music by: John Debney
- Production companies: Summit Entertainment; OddLot Entertainment; Montecito Picture Company
- Distributed by: Summit Entertainment (through Lionsgate)
- Release dates: April 7, 2014 (Los Angeles); April 11, 2014 (United States)
- Running time: 110 minutes
- Country: United States
- Language: English
- Budget: $25 million
- Box office: $29.8 million

Draft Day is a 2014 American sports drama film directed by Ivan Reitman, and starring Kevin Costner and Jennifer Garner, with Denis Leary, Frank Langella, Sam Elliott, Ellen Burstyn and Chadwick Boseman in supporting roles. The premise revolves around the fictional general manager of the Cleveland Browns (Costner) deciding what to do after his team acquires the number one draft pick in the upcoming National Football League draft.

The film premiered in Los Angeles on April 7, 2014 and was released in the United States by Summit Entertainment (through Lionsgate) on April 11, 2014. It received mixed reviews from critics and was a box office failure, grossing only $29 million against its $25 million budget. The film was Reitman's final directorial effort and Jim Brown's final acting role before their deaths in 2022 and 2023 respectively.

== Plot ==
On the morning of the 2014 NFL draft, Cleveland Browns general manager Sonny Weaver Jr. must decide how to use the seventh overall pick to improve the team, but he has other problems on his mind. His semi-secret girlfriend Ali Parker, the team's salary cap analyst, is pregnant, and the recent death of Sonny's father causes tension with his mother. Sonny had fired his father, a legendary coach for the Browns, which he later admits was for his mother's sake because his father refused to retire even with failing health.

The Seattle Seahawks hold the first overall draft pick, which general manager Tom Michaels offers to trade to Sonny; this would allow the Browns to draft highly-rated Wisconsin quarterback Bo Callahan. Sonny initially declines, but after being pressured by team owner Anthony Molina to make a "big-splash", reluctantly agrees to the deal, trading away the Browns' first-round draft picks for the current draft plus the next two years. The unexpected opportunity to obtain Callahan excites Browns fans, but splits the team's front office and players. Particularly incensed are Browns head coach Vince Penn, who had wanted to draft Florida State running back Ray Jennings for his system offense, and current quarterback Brian Drew, who had led the team to a 5–1 start the previous year before being injured.

The trade goes public after a tweet by Ohio State linebacker Vontae Mack, who had been Sonny's original choice as first pick. Mack tells Sonny to rewatch game footage of him and Callahan playing against each other. Although Wisconsin won, Mack had four quarterback sacks on Callahan and forced a fumble that Mack recovered for a touchdown. Callahan's only major offensive victory took place after Mack was ejected after giving a fan (his sister) a ball after his touchdown. Sonny begins to have doubts about Callahan's ability under pressure, and the Browns' investigations also bring Callahan's character into question. Weaver also turns down a proposed trade for the pick from the Buffalo Bills, as well as an inquiry from the Kansas City Chiefs about the availability of Drew.

When the draft begins that evening, Sonny agonizes over the choice before drafting Mack at number one. Roger Goodell's announcement of the selection shocks the rest of the league, and disrupts many of their plans for their own picks. Molina is irate and flies back to Cleveland, intent on firing Sonny. Penn is also incensed and threatens to resign.

Rumors spread about Callahan as other teams avoid selecting him. However, the Seahawks are still in contention to select Callahan with the seventh pick, and Sonny senses an opportunity. He convinces the rookie general manager of the Jacksonville Jaguars to trade him their pick at six in exchange for the Browns' second-round draft picks over the next three drafts. Sonny then calls Michaels; in return for passing on Callahan, Sonny demands his first-round picks back, along with punt returner David Putney. After fraught negotiations, the Seahawks seal the deal and choose Callahan with the sixth pick. With his now-restored seventh pick, Sonny appeases Penn and Molina by selecting Jennings, himself the son of former Browns player Earl Jennings.

Molina and his team celebrate an outstanding draft for the Browns. After the draft party, Sonny reconciles with his mother over his excellent draft performance and her soon-to-be first grandchild. Four months later, Sonny and Ali watch as the Browns make their season debut, with Mack and Jennings in the lineup.

== Cast ==
- Kevin Costner as Sonny Weaver Jr., the general manager of the Cleveland Browns
- Jennifer Garner as Ali Parker, the Browns' finance manager and Sonny's love interest
- Denis Leary as Coach Vince Penn, head coach of the Browns, replacing Sonny's father
- Frank Langella as Anthony Molina, owner of the Browns
- Sam Elliott as Coach Moore, head coach of Bo Callahan at the University of Wisconsin
- Sean Combs as Chris Crawford, sports agent representing #1 draft prospect Bo Callahan
- Terry Crews as Earl Jennings, retired Hall of Fame Browns player
- Ellen Burstyn as Barb Weaver, Sonny's mother
- Chadwick Boseman as Vontae Mack, a top draft prospect, linebacker from Ohio State University
- Rosanna Arquette as Angie, Sonny's ex wife
- W. Earl Brown as Ralph Mowry, the Browns' Director Of Security
- Kevin Dunn as Marvin, the Browns' chief representative at the NFL Draft
- Arian Foster as Ray Jennings, draft prospect, running back from Florida State University, Earl's son
- Pat Healy as Jeff Carson, general manager of the Jacksonville Jaguars
- Brad William Henke as Tony "Bagel" Bagli, the Browns' strength and conditioning coach
- Wallace Langham as Pete Begler, general manager of the Kansas City Chiefs
- Chi McBride as Walt Gordon, team president of the Seattle Seahawks
- Griffin Newman as Rick the Intern
- Josh Pence as Bo Callahan, Heisman Trophy–winning quarterback from University of Wisconsin
- David Ramsey as Thompson, member of the Browns' draft day war room
- Patrick St. Esprit as Tom Michaels, general manager of the Seattle Seahawks
- Timothy Simons as Marx, member of the Browns' war room
- Tom Welling as Brian Drew, the Browns' starting quarterback from the previous year
- Wade Williams as O'Reilly, member of the Browns' war room
- Tony Rizzo as himself, radio host for ESPN Cleveland
- Aaron Goldhammer as himself, radio host for ESPN Cleveland

A number of NFL players, executives and sportscasters had cameo appearances as themselves, including: Chris Berman, Russ Brandon, Jim Brown, Rich Eisen, Roger Goodell, Jon Gruden, Bernie Kosar, Ray Lewis and Alex Marvez.

== Production ==
Draft Day writers Rajiv Joseph and Scott Rothman met while attending graduate school at New York University. They bonded over their love of both writing and football and joked around about the idea of creating something together. It was not until years later, a mutual friend of theirs mentioned that despite not being a fan of football, she found watching the NFL Draft enjoyable. This led Joseph and Rothman to get into contact with the then general manager of the New York Jets, Mike Tannenbaum. They had a call with him and asked him many questions about what the environment of Draft Day was like for the managers. They quickly realized that despite their love of football, they had no idea the way that the Draft played out. They continued to think about a possible story they could tell and what characters or plots they could bring to a football movie. The two writers eventually wrote a very rushed first screenplay of Draft Day to submit to the Sundance Institute for a Screenwriter's Lab in September 2011. They were not accepted into the program, but were able to spend more time revising the script.

After some revising, the writer duo were able to meet with a producer in Los Angeles and were told that the script was not good and would never be made. However, things began looking up for Draft Day when director Ivan Reitman contacted the writers and told them he wanted to make their movie. Paramount Pictures was originally set to produce the film, but dropped out, leaving the team at a loss of what to do. Reitman was convinced the movie could be a major production, and eventually got OddLot Entertainment and Summit Entertainment on board.

When the idea was first made public, the film was to be centered on the Buffalo Bills, but the studio subsequently changed it to the Cleveland Browns because of cheaper production costs in Ohio.

Typically, screenwriters are not needed after the movie goes into production; however, Joseph and Rothman were called to set nearly daily to meet with star Kevin Costner to go over the script and make any needed adjustments. Because of this, the script was often changed on the fly during the shooting days.

The first day of filming took place during the day of the actual 2013 NFL Draft at Radio City Music Hall. Actual SportCenter casters Chris Berman and Mel Kiper as well as NFL commissioner Roger Goodell read lines for the movie right before the actual draft started. Crowd reactions of fans at the actual 2013 NFL draft, as well as Cleveland Browns fans at local bars, were filmed. Cameos with real-life NFL figures such as league commissioner Roger Goodell and ESPN sportscaster Chris Berman were filmed before and after the draft took place. The rest of the film began filming on May 8, 2013.

=== Marketing ===
The first poster and trailer for the film were released on December 23, 2013.

== Reception ==
=== Critical response ===
On the review aggregator website Rotten Tomatoes, 60% of 160 critics' reviews are positive, with an average rating of 5.8/10. The website's consensus reads: "It's perfectly pleasant for sports buffs and Costner fans, but overall, Draft Day lives down to its title by relying too heavily on the sort of by-the-numbers storytelling that only a statistician could love." Metacritic, which uses a weighted average, assigned the film a score of 54 out of 100, based on 33 critics, indicating "mixed or average" reviews. Audiences polled by CinemaScore gave the film an average grade of "B+" on an A+ to F scale.

Chicago Sun-Times critic Richard Roeper gave the film a "B", stating the film is "a sentimental, predictable, sometimes implausible but thoroughly entertaining, old-fashioned piece."

Ian Rapoport, an NFL Network Insider who held multiple brief cameos throughout the film, admitted that there are "plenty of things that aren't exactly the way it goes" within the actual drafting process. He then went on to praise the film on how NFL general managers "do talk about trades as they did during the movie," and the honest discussions real people may have.

On the contrary, Jack Hamilton of Slate was harshly critical. "The 'filmmaking' here consists of making sure the camera is pointed at people who are explaining the film's plot to one another, preferably while they are wearing logos and standing in front of more logos," he wrote. He suggested the NFL's involvement had made the film too upbeat. "[It] isn't so much a movie as a movielike infomercial for the kinder, gentler NFL ... In the wake of labor strife, off-field scandals, and the ongoing CTE concussions crisis, the NFL is doubling down on its fantasy of paternalism, and Draft Day is that fantasy's porn film."

Former Green Bay Packers vice president Andrew Brandt criticized Draft Day as "lacking any true depiction of how an NFL team operates leading up to and during the draft", and less realistic about the business of sports than Jerry Maguire and Moneyball. Riley McAtee, writing for The Ringer, noted that the Browns burdened themselves with an additional $7 million in annual salary (as stated by a Seahawks executive in the film) to the fictional Mack—a player who would have been lucky to be drafted 15th overall—compounded by the fact that the Browns have also deprived the fictional Callahan of $7 million in annual salary that he, not Mack, should be making: McAtee also notes the complete ineptness of the fictional executives of the Seahawks and Jaguars, making bad deal after bad deal, calling the latter the equivalent of "a kid who just wet his pants".

The screenplay was the number one script on the 2012 Black List survey of unproduced screenplays. Writing for WhatCulture, David Hynes listed it as the 10th best script of the 2010s, arguing that it "follows one of the central tenets of screenwriting which is, 'thou shalt make things as hard as possible for your protagonist'". However, he felt that the film's execution failed to deliver on a script that was "as good as it gets."

== Release ==
=== Domestic box office ===
Against a budget of $25 million, Draft Day grossed $29.8 million worldwide over 37 weeks, including $28.8 million domestically (United States and Canada), of which around $9.8 million (34% of the total) was taken during the film's opening weekend. It spent its first two weeks in the Top 10 at the domestic box office, before quickly dropping to 58th nearing the end of its theatrical release cycle.

=== Domestic video sales ===
Based on total market estimates collected by The Numbers, a film industry statistics site that utilizes data to provide real analytics, Draft Day is estimated to have earned $12.1 million in Domestic Video Sales.

=== International box office ===
Close to $1 million was earned in international box offices, as Mexico and Venezuela are responsible for over half of these earnings. Even though American football is predominantly popular within the U.S., Vietnam released the movie on June 27, 2014, with just a few ticket sales amassing $878.

=== Digital release ===
Prime Video, Apple TV+, and HBO Max are all streaming platforms for the film, as well as free-with-ads on any Roku streaming service.

== Analysis ==
Regarding sports in the United States, the NFL draft is one of the most celebrated and anticipated cultural phenomena. Steve Persall from the Tampa Bay Times remains very opinionated about the shortcomings of the film, claiming that "[t]his movie doesn't even trust the viewers to know where teams play" as each city is introduced with their relative mascot. Other critics dissected and compared the less-than-realistic happenings within the film to their NFL Draft counterparts. For example, most of the info-gathering occurs on the final day of the draft when real NFL Draft decisions take months of research and planning. These details are simple to overlook during the production of a multi-million-dollar movie, as Ian Rapoport is recorded sharing his awareness of the film's inaccuracies stating that "Hollywood does its thing". With the inclusion of an underdeveloped love story amid heavy sports talk, the film strays from capitalizing on die-hard NFL fans before the film is even released.

The film itself is also treated similarly to the NFL draft, many scenes play like advertisements, with logo after logo being shoved in the viewer's face, along with loud visuals that "give the viewer the impression they're watching something truly important." The NFL draft provides tens of millions of dollars to first picks, but these large-scale stakes are difficult to convey in a two-hour film.

== TV adaptation ==
In January 2024, it was announced SpringHill Company and Lionsgate Television would be adapting Draft Day for television shifting the focus to the NBA draft.

== See also ==
- List of American football films
