= Beethoven: The Ultimate Canine Caper =

1993 video game

- Super NES cover art
- Developers: Riedel Software Productions (SNES); Rozner Labs Software (MS-DOS)
- Publisher: Hi Tech Expressions
- Platforms: Super NES, Game Boy, MS-DOS
- Release: NA: December 1993; EU: December 1993; SA: February 1994
- Genre: Platform

Beethoven: The Ultimate Canine Caper (also known as Beethoven's 2nd or Beethoven) is a platform game developed by Riedel Software Productions and published by Hi Tech Expressions for the Super Nintendo Entertainment System, Game Boy, and MS-DOS compatible operating systems. The game is an adaption of the 1993 film Beethoven's 2nd. The MS-DOS conversion was developed by Rozner Labs Software. Versions of the game were developed for the Sega Genesis and Game Gear but never released.

== Gameplay ==
Beethoven: The Ultimate Canine Caper is a side-scrolling and platform game. Beethoven's four puppies are missing so the player takes control of Beethoven, maneuvering him through the neighborhood to find them. A supersonic waved barking attack is used against enemies like dogcatchers and cats. Players can use growling to charge Beethoven's bark which increases the destructive power. When Beethoven is soaked by water in the game, he can shake the water off at enemies which causes them to take damage. During the game, the player must rescue each of the puppies that belongs to Beethoven and Missy. There are two divided sections in each level, which involves guiding Beethoven to the puppy and then bringing Missy the puppy back.

== Reception ==
Video game journalist Roy Bassave praised the game's graphics and action moves while calling it a family game. Nintendo Power gave Beethoven: The Ultimate Canine Caper a 2.475 out of 5 rating (49.50% ratio).
