= Beethoven's 2nd (film) =

1993 American film by Rod Daniel

- Theatrical release poster
- Directed by: Rod Daniel
- Written by: Len Blum
- Based on: Characters by: Edmond Dantès; Amy Holden Jones
- Produced by: Michael C. Gross; Joe Medjuck
- Starring: Charles Grodin; Bonnie Hunt; Debi Mazar; Chris Penn
- Cinematography: Bill Butler
- Edited by: William D. Gordean; Sheldon Kahn
- Music by: Randy Edelman
- Production company: Northern Lights Entertainment
- Distributed by: Universal Pictures
- Release date: December 17, 1993
- Running time: 89 minutes
- Country: United States
- Language: English
- Budget: $15 million
- Box office: $118.2 million

Beethoven's 2nd is a 1993 American family comedy film. Directed by Rod Daniel and written by Len Blum, it is the sequel to the 1992 film Beethoven, the second installment in the Beethoven film series, and the last to be released theatrically. Charles Grodin, Bonnie Hunt, Nicholle Tom, Christopher Castile, and Sarah Rose Karr reprised their roles with Debi Mazar and Chris Penn joining the cast. Initially, no sequel was planned, but it was produced after the unexpected financial success of the previous film. Beethoven's 2nd was released by Universal Pictures on December 17, 1993. The film received negative reviews from critics but was a commercial success, grossing $118.2 million worldwide against a $15 million budget.

== Plot ==
In the Newton family home, George, Alice, Ryce, Ted, Emily, and Beethoven are all well-adjusted to living together. One day, Beethoven sneaks out and meets a female St. Bernard, Missy, and her owner, Brillo. However, Brillo's hateful soon-to-be ex-wife, Regina, arrives with her new boyfriend, Floyd, to take Missy away and threatens to keep her unless Brillo agrees to a $50,000 alimony settlement when the divorce is finalized.

Beethoven helps Missy to escape from Regina and Floyd's apartment, and the two dogs fall in love. Meanwhile, Ryce develops strong romantic feelings for her classmate, Taylor Devereaux, after he kisses her. Over two months later, Ted and Emily become aware of Beethoven constantly sneaking out of the house and follow him, where they discover that he and Missy had four puppies in the basement of Regina and Floyd's apartment building. The building's janitor, Gus, also finds the dogs and informs Regina and Floyd. Regina then reclaims Missy and plans to drown the puppies, but Gus tells Regina that purebred puppies are worth big money and that she should sell them.

After hearing Regina's plan to drown the puppies, Ted and Emily sneak the puppies out of her building and into their own basement. Ryce, Ted, and Emily take it upon themselves to feed and care for the puppies while hiding them from George. However, when he eventually discovers the puppies, George reluctantly agrees to keep them until they mature. The kids then name the puppies Dolly, Tchaikovsky, Chubby, and Mo.

The Newtons are offered a free stay in a mountain lakefront house owned by one of George's business associates. There, Taylor invites Ryce to a party with his friends, where she is exposed to teenage drinking and sexual harassment. Taylor locks Ryce in his bedroom, but Beethoven destroys the house's patio deck, saving a grateful Ryce from Taylor's unwelcome advances. Regina and Floyd are staying in a location unknown to Brillo, coincidentally near the Newtons' vacation house. The Newtons go to a county fair with the dogs, where Ryce, Ted, and Emily persuade George to enter a burger eating contest with Beethoven, which they win. Regina and Floyd are also at the fair, but leave Missy in their car.

Missy escapes from the car with Beethoven's help, and they run into the mountains together while Regina snatches the puppies' leashes from Ted and Emily. Regina and Floyd follow the puppies through the woods and locate Beethoven and Missy at a cliff's edge. When the Newtons catch up, George confronts Floyd, who threatens to drop the puppies into the river below and pokes George in the stomach with a large stick. Beethoven charges into the stick and rams it into Floyd's groin in retaliation, causing him to lose his balance. Regina grabs Floyd's hand and they both fall off the cliff and into a pool of mud before getting swept away by the river.

Five months later, Brillo visits the Newtons with Missy, revealing that the judge in the divorce threw out Regina's claim and has granted him full custody of Missy. The puppies, now grown, run downstairs to see Missy.

== Cast ==
- Charles Grodin as George Newton
- Bonnie Hunt as Alice Newton
- Nicholle Tom as Ryce Newton
- Christopher Castile as Ted Newton
- Sarah Rose Karr as Emily Newton
- Debi Mazar as Regina
- Chris Penn as Floyd
- Ashley Hamilton as Taylor Devereaux
- Danny Masterson as Seth
- Maury Chaykin as Cliff Klamath
- Catherine Reitman as Janie
- Heather McComb as Michelle
- Scott Waara as Banker
- Jeff Corey as Gus
- Virginia Capers as Linda Anderson
- Jordan Bond as Jordan
- Pat Jankiewicz as Arthur Lewis
- Kevin Dunn as Brillo (additional cast)

The film was Danny Masterson's screen debut. His younger brother, Christopher, also had a small role, but when the producers noticed the resemblance, they removed him.

== Production ==
The film is set in California, but the park scenes were filmed in Montana at Glacier National Park. The house used as the Newtons' home is located at 1405 Milan Avenue in South Pasadena.

Production required more than 100 smooth- and rough-coated St. Bernard puppies of various ages starting at seven weeks, who were then returned to the breeders. Missy was played by three adult short-haired dogs, and Beethoven was played by two long-haired ones, although only the dog who created the role in the first film is credited; a mechanical dog, a dog's head for specific facial expressions, and a man in a dog suit were also used.

=== Song ===
The theme song, "The Day I Fall in Love", performed by James Ingram and Dolly Parton and written by Ingram, Carole Bayer Sager and Clif Magness, was nominated for an Academy Award, a Golden Globe, and a Grammy Award.

== Reception ==
The film grossed more than $118 million at the box office worldwide.

=== Critical response ===
Although the film was not well received by film critics, it received acclaim by audiences. Brian Lowry of Variety wrote that it "[amounted] to a live-action cartoon" and was "certainly a more pleasing tale" than the first. Roger Ebert of the Chicago Sun-Times gave it two stars, calling it "no masterpiece" but praising Grodin's work and noting that the dogs carried it though both he and Gene Siskel heavily criticized the party scene finding it both pointless and believing that the subject of sexual assault was inappropriate for a family film. Kevin Thomas in the Los Angeles Times rated it "just as funny and appealing as Beethoven the first" and also praised Mazar as Regina.

On Rotten Tomatoes, the film has a score of 23%, based on reviews from 13 critics, with an average rating of 4.55/10. Audiences surveyed by CinemaScore gave it a grade "A".

== In other media ==
- Beethoven: The Ultimate Canine Caper, a side-scrolling video game titled simply Beethoven, but based on the film, was released for Super NES, MS-DOS and Game Boy. Versions for Sega Genesis and Game Gear were developed, but they were never commercially released.
- Harvey Comics: Beethoven (March 1994)
