= Francesca Marie Smith =

American actress (born 1985)

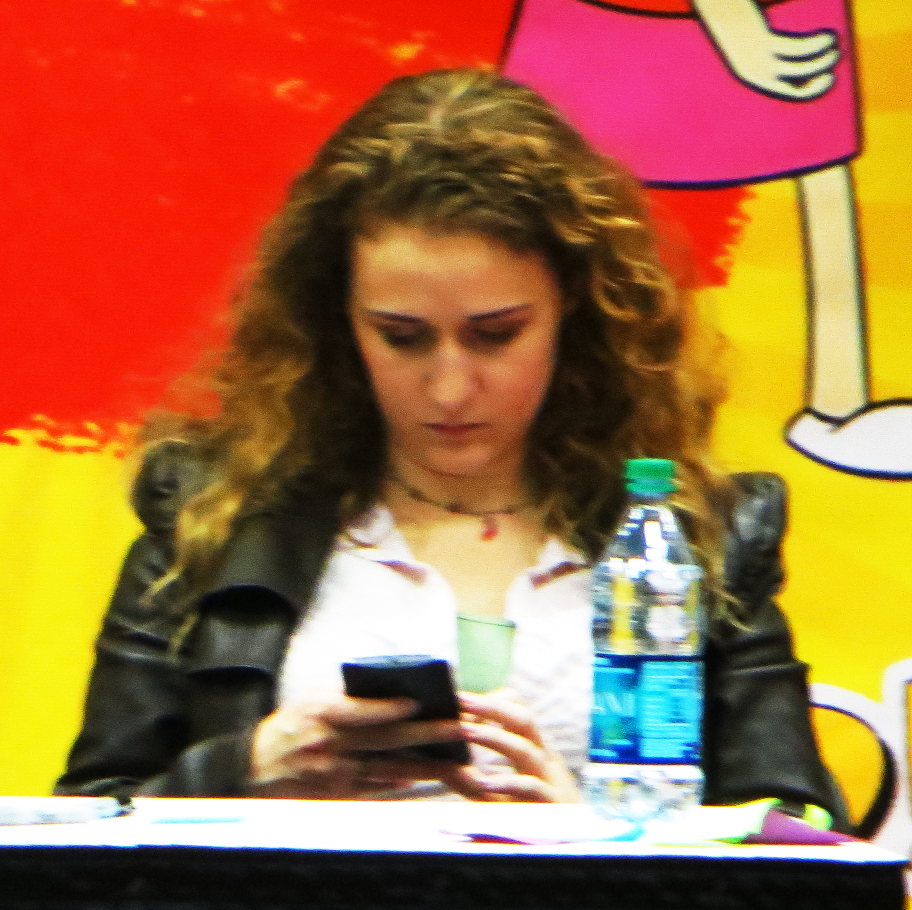
- Smith in 2015
- Born: March 26, 1985 (age 41)
- Occupation: Actress
- Years active: 1991–2004; 2017–2023
- Known for: Hey Arnold! Recess

Francesca Marie Smith (born March 26, 1985) is an American actress known for voicing Helga Pataki on the Nickelodeon animated television series Hey Arnold!. She is also known for voicing multiple characters on Disney's Recess, most notably as Ashley B. and Swinger Girl, among others.

== Personal life ==
Smith studied at Pepperdine University, graduating in 2008. She obtained a Ph.D. from USC Annenberg in 2021.

On March 27, 2019, Smith stated that she had been diagnosed with relapsing-remitting multiple sclerosis via Twitter (now X).

On April 12, 2024, Smith was admitted to the Keck Hospital as a result of a major relapse effect of MS (similar to a stroke) and stated that she was unable to walk, speak and even eat solid foods for three weeks, while also having trouble breathing. Thus, she set up a fundraiser called *FrancescaAndHerMSJourney to help her recovery.

== Filmography ==
=== Television ===
Year	Title	Role	Notes
1991	Parker Lewis Can't Lose	Elaine Leffler	Episode: "Boy Meets Girl"
1992	In Sickness and in Health	Kid #1	Television film
1994	Blossom	Lizzy Martin	Episode: "Dirty Rotten Scoundrel"
1994–1996	Itsy Bitsy Spider	Leslie McGroarty (voice)	26 episodes
1994	Beethoven	Emily Newton (voice)	13 episodes
1995	Daisy-Head Mayzie	Mayzie McGrew (voice)	Television special
1995	Here Come the Munsters	Monique	Television film
1995	The Drew Carey Show	Monica	Episode: "Lewis's Sister"
1996	Nick Freno: Licensed Teacher	Ursula	Episode: "Hot for Teacher"
1996–1998	The Secret World of Alex Mack	Jenny, Pipe Victims Sister	3 episodes
1996–2004	Hey Arnold!	Helga Pataki, Sheena, Campfire Lass, Various voices (voice)	86 episodes
1997	Knots Landing: Back to the Cul-de-Sac	Meg MacKenzie	Miniseries
1997	Pepper Ann	Damiana (voice)	Episode: "Thanksgiving Dad"
1997–2001	Recess	Ashley B., Swinger Girl, Upside-Down Girl (voice)	14 episodes
1998	101 Dalmatians: The Series	Amber (voice)	Episode: "Beauty Pageant Pandemonium"
1998	The New Batman Adventures	Annie (voice)	Episode: "Growing Pains"
1999	Two of a Kind	Gabrielle	Episode: "Kevin Burke's Day Off"
2000–2002	The Amanda Show	Various	3 episodes
2001	Lloyd in Space	Additional voices	Episode: "Caution: Wormhole!"
2002	The Zeta Project	Transita (voice)	Episode: "Ro's Gift"
2003	Fillmore!	Penny Madrid (voice)	Episode: "Immune to All But Justice"
2017	Hey Arnold!: The Jungle Movie	Helga Pataki (voice)	Television film
2018	Subway Surfers: The Series	N/A	Writer

=== Film ===
Year	Title	Role	Notes
1998	A Bug's Life	Additional voices & Ephorah	
1998	The Prince of Egypt	Additional voices & Ephorah	
2001	Recess: School's Out	Ashley B., Swinger Girl, Upside-Down Girl (voice)	
2001	Recess Christmas: Miracle on Third Street	Ashley B. (voice)	Direct-to-video
2002	Hey Arnold!: The Movie	Helga Pataki (voice)	
2003	Recess: Taking the Fifth Grade	Ashley B., Swinger Girl, Upside Down Girl (voice)	Direct-to-video
2003	Recess: All Growed Down	Upside-Down Girl (voice)	Direct-to-video

=== Video games ===
Year	Title	Role	Notes
2000	Nicktoons Racing	Helga Pataki	Archival recordings
2021	Nickelodeon All-Star Brawl	Helga Pataki	Voiceover added in the June 2022 update
2022	Nickelodeon Extreme Tennis	Helga Pataki	
2022	Nickelodeon Kart Racers 3: Slime Speedway	Helga Pataki	

== Awards and nominations ==
In 1998, Smith won the award for Best Performance in a Voice-Over – TV or Film: Young Actress at the 19th Youth in Film Awards for her role on Hey Arnold!. She was nominated for Best Youth Actress in a Voice-Over Role: TV or Movie at the 15th Youth in Film Awards for Itsy Bitsy Spider and for Best Performance in a TV Drama Series: Guest Starring Young Actress at the 18th Youth in Film Awards for her role on The Secret World of Alex Mack. In 2001, Smith was nominated for Best Performance in a Voice-Over: TV/Film/Video – Young Actress at the 22nd Young Artist Awards for her role on Hey Arnold!.
