= Christopher Castile =

American actor

- Born: Christopher Jon Castile; June 15, 1980 (age 46); Orange County, California, U.S.
- Education: California State University, Long Beach (BA; MA)
- Occupations: Actor, professor
- Years active: 1990–1998

Christopher Jon Castile (born June 15, 1980) is an American professor and former actor. His well-known roles include Ted Newton in Beethoven and Beethoven's 2nd, the voice of Zachary Sellers and Nick Mulligan in Focus on the Family's Adventures in Odyssey, Mark Foster on the sitcom Step by Step, and the voice of Eugene Horowitz in Hey Arnold!.

== Personal life ==
Following the cancellation of Step by Step, Castile retired from acting and went on to earn a bachelor's and master's degree in political science from California State University, Long Beach. He currently teaches political science at Biola University in La Mirada, California, along with AP Macroeconomics and AP Research at Downey High School.

== Credits ==
Year	Title	Role	Notes
1990	My Two Dads		Episode: "To Thine Own Elf Be True"
1990	Hurricane Sam	Neil Gianelli	TV movie
1990	Empty Nest	Larry	Episode: "Barbara the Mom"
1990	The Fanelli Boys	Timmy	Episode: "Tarnished Angel"
1991	Going Places	Sam Roberts	3 episodes
1991	The Family Man	Lowell	Episode: "Trading Places"
1991–1998	Step by Step	Mark Foster	160 episodes
1992	Beethoven	Ted Newton	
1992	Empty Nest	Barry	Episode: "Final Analysis"
1993	Beethoven's 2nd	Ted Newton	
1995-2002	Adventures in Odyssey	Zachery Sellars	6 episodes
1995	Are You Afraid of the Dark?	Jason	"The Tale of Prisoner's Past"
1996–1997	Hey Arnold!	Eugene Horowitz (voice)	8 episodes

== Awards and nominations ==
Young Artist Award

- 1992: Nominated, "Best Young Actor Starring in a Television Series" – Step by Step
- 1992: Nominated, "Best Young Actor Starring in a Motion Picture" – Beethoven
- 1993: Nominated, "Outstanding Youth Ensemble in a Television Series" – Step by Step (shared w/cast)
- 1994: Nominated, "Best Performance by a Youth Ensemble in a Motion Picture" – Beethoven's 2nd (shared w/cast)
- 1996: Nominated, "Best Performance by a Young Actor in a TV Comedy Series" – Step by Step
