= Beethoven (film) =

- Theatrical release poster
- Directed by: Brian Levant
- Written by: Edmond Dantès; Amy Holden Jones
- Produced by: Joe Medjuck; Michael C. Gross
- Starring: Charles Grodin; Bonnie Hunt; Dean Jones; Oliver Platt; Stanley Tucci
- Cinematography: Victor J. Kemper
- Edited by: William D. Gordean; Sheldon Kahn
- Music by: Randy Edelman
- Production companies: Northern Lights Entertainment; Hughes Entertainment
- Distributed by: Universal Pictures
- Release date: April 3, 1992
- Running time: 87 minutes
- Country: United States
- Language: English
- Box office: $147.2 million

Beethoven is a 1992 American family comedy film, directed by Brian Levant and written by John Hughes (under the pseudonym "Edmond Dantès") and Amy Holden Jones. The film's plot centers on a St. Bernard dog named after the famous German composer who finds a home with a suburban family. It was released by Universal Pictures on April 3, 1992, and received mixed reviews from critics but was a box office success, earning $147.2 million worldwide. The film spawned a franchise, including a short-lived animated TV series. A sequel, Beethoven's 2nd, was released the following year.

== Plot ==
Two thieves, Harvey and Vernon, steal a group of puppies from a pet store. A St. Bernard puppy escapes and sneaks into the home of the Newton family. The patriarch, George, is a control freak and workaholic who does not want a dog. However, his wife, Alice, and their three children, Ryce, Ted, and Emily, convince him to adopt the puppy. The puppy is named "Beethoven" after Emily plays a portion of Ludwig van Beethoven's Fifth Symphony on the piano and he barks along to it.

Beethoven quickly grows into a large dog, and George must clean up after the lovable, but slobbery, mischievous animal. Beethoven becomes an important part of the family: he helps Ryce talk to her crush Mark, scares off a group of bullies harassing Ted, and saves Emily's life when she falls into an irresponsible babysitter's swimming pool. George still maintains his dislike, which is further aggravated when the dog's antics ruin a barbecue he is hosting for Brad and Brie Wilson, unpleasant venture capitalists looking to invest in and, unbeknownst to George, swindle him out of his car air freshener firm.

The Newtons take Beethoven to veterinarian Dr. Herman Varnick for a routine medical exam, unaware that he is secretly involved in unethical animal experiments and is seeking large-skulled dogs to test ammunition on. Dr. Varnick tells George of a supposed mental instability among St. Bernards that makes them potentially dangerous and violent, advising him to watch Beethoven closely for any sign of viciousness. Later, under the pretense of doing a follow-up exam on Beethoven, Dr. Varnick visits the Newton home. After applying fake blood onto his arm and Beethoven's nose, Dr. Varnick repeatedly hits Beethoven until the dog retaliates, unaware that Emily saw him. When the rest of the family comes outside to rescue Dr. Varnick, he claims that Beethoven attacked him without provocation and must be euthanized. Dr. Varnick also threatens to press charges if the Newtons decline, despite Emily's protests that Dr. Varnick is lying. Before George takes Beethoven to Dr. Varnick's office, he sees the children devastated, saying that George dislikes Beethoven. However, George has no choice but to take Beethoven to be euthanized. On the way there, George remembers that he had a dog when he was a child and his father had to take the dog to the vet to be euthanized; he never forgave him for it. George is worried that Ryce, Ted, and Emily will do the same thing. When they get there, George says goodbye to Beethoven before taking his collar and leash. When George returns home, his kids do the same thing George did when his dog died, and they, along with Alice, leave the dining room.

Alice convinces George that they should believe Emily rather than someone they only met twice. The Newtons all return to Dr. Varnick's office to reclaim Beethoven, but Dr. Varnick says Beethoven already passed away. George remembers that the receptionist told him that Beethoven would not be euthanized until the next morning before noticing that Dr. Varnick has no bite marks on his arm. Realizing that Emily was telling the truth the whole time, George punches Dr. Varnick in retaliation before leaving.

Afterwards, the Newtons covertly follow Dr. Varnick to his warehouse, where Beethoven has been kept the whole time. Beethoven manages to escape from his cage but is recaptured by Harvey and Vernon, who are working for Dr. Varnick. As Alice tries to call the police, George goes to the top of the building to spy through the skylight. The skylight shatters, and George falls to the ground in front of Dr. Varnick, who prepares to shoot both him and Beethoven. However, Sparky, a captive Jack Russell Terrier that Beethoven had earlier befriended, bites Dr. Varnick in the groin, causing his shot to miss. Ted hears the gunshot and smashes the car through the warehouse entrance, crashing into a cart and launching numerous syringes into Dr. Varnick, sedating him. As the Newtons reunite with Beethoven and free all the captive dogs, they notice Harvey and Vernon trying to escape. Ted sends the dogs after them, but Harvey and Vernon escape into a junkyard, only to be attacked by four Doberman guard dogs.

Dr. Varnick, Harvey, and Vernon are all arrested for animal abuse. The Newtons are praised as heroes in the news, George takes a new liking to Beethoven, and Ryce gets a call from Mark. The Newtons then go to sleep, saying good night to Beethoven and all the other dogs they rescued.

== Cast ==
- Charles Grodin as George Newton
- Bonnie Hunt as Alice Newton
- Dean Jones as Dr. Herman Varnick
- Oliver Platt as Harvey
- Stanley Tucci as Vernon
- Nicholle Tom as Ryce Newton
- Christopher Castile as Ted Newton
- Sarah Rose Karr as Emily Newton
- David Duchovny as Brad Wilson
- Patricia Heaton as Brie Wilson
- Laurel Cronin as Devonia Peet
- Nancy Fish as Miss Grundel
- Joseph Gordon-Levitt as One of Ted's Schoolmates
- Richard Portnow as Ammo Gun Salesman

== Production ==
John Hughes left the Beethoven script for Universal Pictures when he parted ways with the studio. Hughes allowed Universal to make the film on the condition that he be credited under his pseudonym, Edmond Dantès. It became an open secret in the industry that Hughes was behind the pseudonym.

The dogs featured in the film were owned and trained by Eleanor Keaton, the wife of Buster Keaton. Beethoven is played by canine actor Chris, who had 12 doubles.

Principal photography began on May 1, 1991, in Los Angeles, California, under the direction of Steve Rash, but he left the production due to creative differences and was replaced with Brian Levant.

== Reception ==
=== Critical response ===
On review aggregator Rotten Tomatoes, it has an approval rating of 31%, based on reviews from 29 critics, with an average score of 4.7/10. The critical consensus reads: "Fluffy and incorrigible, Beethoven is a good boy who deserves a better movie." Audiences surveyed by CinemaScore gave Beethoven a grade of A.

The Washington Post's Rita Kempley praised the film as a "a waggish tale of canine chicanery, an uproarious if impawsible symphony of drool, doggy fidelity and chewed shoes." Johanna Steinmetz of the Chicago Tribune wrote that "Beethoven charms its way through [its] highly formulaic premise with the help of some smart animal-handling, a few excellently realized visual stunts and narrative montages of life a la dog." The Hartford Courant said: "The most important work comes from a hulking, brown-eyed, sad-faced big star named Chris, who makes Beethoven into a Benji for the '90s, a sort of canine Wallace Beery or Walter Matthau. Roll on, Beethoven."

In The New York Times, Caryn James wrote Beethoven is "much more enjoyable than it has any right to be" and "tugs all the right strings, in a manner strangely reminiscent of Home Alone. It is savvy about kids' troubles...[and] is sentimental but not gooey. Most important, its cartoonish bad guys offer villainy without any true danger and are vanquished by a non-adult hero". James's colleague Janet Maslin also gave a positive review, opining that while the film is "no classic...it's a sunny, energetic children's film with a good notion of what young audiences like."

James added Charles Grodin "provides much of the adult appeal of Beethoven. He underplays his comic scenes where another actor would have been mugging furiously, but he still lets on that George is a softy underneath it all." In the Los Angeles Times, Michael Wilmington said: "The movie is about the way pets humanize uptight suburbanites. And the suburbanite here, Charles Grodin as George Newton, is a good part of what makes Beethoven work. Grodin's mastery of uptight types is always apparent." He concluded that "despite [Beethoven's] crudities, overstatement and predictable plot...there's something a little goofy and sweet about it".

Roger Ebert of the Chicago Sun-Times gave the film two-and-a-half stars out of four, writing in his review that "this is not the sort of entertainment I scour the movie pages for, hoping desperately for a new film about a cute dog. Nor did I find anything particularly new in Beethoven, although I concede that the filmmakers secured an admirable dog for the title role, and that Charles Grodin, who is almost always amusing, has what fun can be had playing the grumpy dad." He concluded Beethoven is "the kind of clever, innocuous family entertainment that's always in short supply."

Negative reviews criticized the film's plot, with some expressing it recycles cliches from other dog films like Turner & Hooch. Others pointed out the film's darker elements may be too scary for young kids. Chris Hicks of the Deseret News wrote that "the first half brings to mind the best elements of Honey, I Shrunk the Kids, with its delightful portrayal of domestic bliss gone awry. But the second half is more like a failed kiddie version of a TV crime drama. And the film never quite recovers." Hal Lipper of the Tampa Bay Times called the film an "87-minute commercial" for pet food company Iams, but praised Bonnie Hunt's performance.

The plot line of Alice leaving the workforce after an alarming experience with a babysitter was criticized in multiple reviews because of its perceived bias against working mothers. In The Boston Globe, Betsy Sherman wrote the film had "a strange tone of desperateness in its depiction of a 'perfect' suburban nuclear family. An assortment of grotesque supporting characters become threats to the family, and are dispatched by Beethoven." The American Veterinary Medical Association expressed disapproval for the film's evil veterinarian plot and sent letters of protest to Ivan Reitman, the film's executive producer, and to the Motion Picture Association of America.

=== Box office ===
Beethoven opened in third place at the North American box office, with a total of $7,587,565. In its fourth week of release, it moved to the number 2 spot. The film ultimately grossed $57,114,049 in North America and $90,100,000 in other territories, for a total of $147.2 million worldwide.

=== Accolades ===
Awards for Beethoven
Award	Category	Nominee	Result
Genesis Awards	Best Feature Film		Won
Young Artist Awards	Best Young Actress Under Ten in a Motion Picture	Sarah Rose Karr	Nominated
Young Artist Awards	Best Family Motion Picture		Nominated
Young Artist Awards	Best Young Actress Starring in a Motion Picture	Nicholle Tom	Nominated
Young Artist Awards	Best Young Actor Starring in a Motion Picture	Christopher Castile	Nominated

== Music ==
The soundtrack to the film was released on December 15, 1992.

No.	Title	Artist	Length
1.	"Opening"	Randy Edelman	4:20
2.	"Discovering the Neighborhood"	Randy Edelman	2:24
3.	"Ciao, Baby"	Randy Edelman	0:40
4.	"Ted and the Bullies"	Randy Edelman	2:36
5.	"Beethoven to the Rescue"	Randy Edelman	2:10
6.	"A Stroll Through Town"	Randy Edelman	1:41
7.	"Puppy Snatchers"	Randy Edelman	3:01
8.	"The Dog Has to Go"	Randy Edelman	2:03
9.	"Table Spin"	Randy Edelman	0:49
10.	"Sparkie's Chase"	Randy Edelman	1:53
11.	"George Gets Turned On"	Randy Edelman	1:29
12.	"Family In Pursuit"	Randy Edelman	1:38
13.	"The Break-In"	Randy Edelman	1:51
14.	"Our Heroes"	Randy Edelman	2:19
15.	"The Dogs Let Loose"	Randy Edelman	1:25
16.	"A Sad Return"	Randy Edelman	2:19
17.	"Ryce's Theme"	Randy Edelman	1:30
18.	"Roll Over Beethoven (written by Chuck Berry)"	Paul Shaffer and The World's Most Dangerous Band	4:43
Total length:			38:51

== Sequels and spin-offs ==
The film was followed by four sequels and three standalone films that use the Beethoven name and the premise of a St. Bernard, but the plots are less and less connected as the series goes on. Beethoven's 2nd was released to theaters in 1993. The remaining sequels were direct-to-video films: Beethoven's 3rd (2000), Beethoven's 4th (2001), Beethoven's 5th (2003), Beethoven's Big Break (2008), Beethoven's Christmas Adventure (2011), and Beethoven's Treasure Tail (2014). An animated TV series was also created around the films that debuted in 1994. Dean Jones voiced George Newton in it after playing Dr. Herman Varnick in the film and Nicholle Tom reprised her role, voicing Ryce Newton. None of the sequels or related media featured the involvement of Hughes.
