= Legal Eagles =

1986 film by Ivan Reitman

- Theatrical release poster
- Directed by: Ivan Reitman
- Screenplay by: Jim Cash; Jack Epps, Jr.
- Story by: Ivan Reitman; Jim Cash; Jack Epps, Jr.
- Produced by: Ivan Reitman
- Starring: Robert Redford; Debra Winger; Daryl Hannah; Brian Dennehy; Terence Stamp; Steven Hill
- Cinematography: Laszlo Kovacs
- Edited by: Pem Herring; Sheldon Kahn; William D. Gordean
- Music by: Elmer Bernstein
- Distributed by: Universal Pictures
- Release date: June 18, 1986
- Running time: 116 minutes
- Country: United States
- Language: English
- Budget: $40 million
- Box office: $93.2 million

Legal Eagles is a 1986 American legal romantic comedy thriller film directed by Ivan Reitman, written by Jim Cash and Jack Epps, Jr. from a story by Reitman and the screenwriters, and starring Robert Redford, Debra Winger, and Daryl Hannah.

Legal Eagles was released by Universal Pictures on June 18, 1986. The film received mixed reviews from critics and grossed $93.2 million against a $40 million budget.

== Plot ==
Tom Logan, an Assistant District Attorney in the Manhattan District Attorney's Office, has his sights set on being the next District Attorney. Laura Kelly, an attorney representing performance artist Chelsea Deardon, seeks out Logan to discuss her client's case. Accused of attempting to steal a painting from millionaire Robert Forrester, Chelsea claims that her artist father, Sebastian Deardon, gave her the painting eighteen years earlier for her 8th birthday. That same day, her father and most of his paintings were lost in a mysterious fire.

At a formal dinner to publicly launch Logan's candidacy for District Attorney, Kelly unexpectedly arrives with Chelsea and holds an impromptu press conference to coerce Logan's cooperation. Soon after, Forrester drops all charges against Chelsea after swapping the Deardon painting for a Picasso with art gallery curator Victor Taft. Both Taft and Forrester were Sebastian Deardon's associates and do not want Chelsea prosecuted. Taft later shows Logan and Kelly the swapped Deardon painting, which does not have an inscription to Chelsea written on the back as she claims. Shortly after, police detective Cavanaugh, who investigated the Deardon fire, provides Kelly with proof that the supposedly lost paintings still exist and says that Chelsea's father was murdered.

Late one night, Chelsea arrives at Logan's apartment claiming a man has been following her. She insists that the painting Taft showed Logan and Kelly was not the one that belongs to her. Logan escorts Chelsea home, but as he leaves her building, someone shoots at him then runs off. Logan and Kelly later follow Taft to his warehouse and sneak in, finding evidence of an insurance fraud scheme between partners Taft, Forrester, and a third man, Joseph Brock. Taft locks them inside the warehouse, then quickly escapes. The two barely escape unharmed as the building explodes, apparently triggered by Taft to destroy evidence.

A distraught Chelsea arrives at Logan's apartment, revealing she went to Taft's residence and threatened him at gunpoint for information. She claims Taft took the gun away and hit her. Chelsea spends the night with Logan. The next morning, police burst into the bedroom and arrest Chelsea for Taft's murder. The resulting scandal ends Logan's career in the D.A.'s office, and he reluctantly teams up with Kelly.

During her murder trial, Chelsea experiences a flashback memory and openly accuses Forrester of being involved in her father's death. When an assassin attempts to run down Logan and Kelly, the man is fatally hit by a taxi. Logan retrieves the assassin's wallet and finds Forrester's business card. Logan and Kelly discover Forrester's dead body and find Chelsea hiding at the scene, though she proclaims her innocence. Logan goes to the police department to find Cavanaugh while Kelly and Chelsea head to Taft's gallery where his memorial service is in progress.

Detective Cavanaugh is actually Joe Brock, Taft and Forrester's former business partner they framed for the fraud scheme, resulting in Brock being sentenced to prison. At the Taft Gallery, Brock forces Kelly and Chelsea to break open a large hollow sculpture where Sebastian Deardon's missing canvases, now estimated to be worth $20 million, are hidden. Brock takes the canvases, then sets the gallery on fire to escape during the evacuation. Logan arrives and struggles with Brock, who falls to his death. Logan finds Kelly and Chelsea, grabs the paintings, and the three exit the burning gallery. Outside, Chelsea tearfully reveals the "To Chelsea" inscription on the back of her father's painting.

After all charges against Chelsea are dropped, Logan's former boss, exploiting Logan's publicity, offers him his old job. Logan chooses to continue working with Kelly, with whom he is now romantically involved.

== Cast ==
- Robert Redford as Tom Logan
- Debra Winger as Laura Kelly
- Daryl Hannah as Chelsea Deardon
- Brian Dennehy as C.J. Cavanaugh / Joseph Brock
- Terence Stamp as Victor Taft
- Steven Hill as Bower
- Christine Baranski as Carol Freeman
- Roscoe Lee Browne as Judge Dawkins
- David Clennon as Blanchard
- John McMartin as Robert Forrester
- Robert Curtis Brown as Roger
- Grant Heslov as The Usher
- Sara Botsford as Barbara
- Jennie Dundas as Jennifer Logan
- David Hart as Marchek
- Gary Klar as Hit Man
- Christian Clemenson as Clerk
- Bruce French as Reporter
- Lynn Hamilton as Doreen
- Brian Doyle-Murray as Shaw
- Burke Byrnes as Second Cop
- Liz Sheridan as Little Old Lady

== Production ==
The script was written by Jim Cash and Jack Epps who were represented by Creative Artists Agency (CAA), based on a story by Cash, Epps and Ivan Reitman from an idea by Reitman, who was also represented by CAA. Reitman had long been interested in doing something set in the art world, with lawyers as protagonists "because they are our contemporary hired guns, involved in every aspect of modern life. I thought the interaction of the two worlds would make for good comedy as well as drama."

The film was originally meant to be a vehicle for Dustin Hoffman and Bill Murray, the latter a CAA client, and was written as a buddy movie. Murray pulled out. Ivan Reitman met with Robert Redford, another CAA client, about another project, and mentioned Legal Eagles. Redford expressed interest in doing a romantic comedy, so Reitman decided to rework it as a Spencer Tracy-Katharine Hepburn-type movie. Redford agreed to make it. "It was easier getting Redford than it was getting Bill Murray," said Reitman.

The film was set up at Universal, run by CAA client Frank Price. Tom Mankiewicz was called in to rewrite the script.

In October 1985 it was announced that Reitman would direct, and Redford, Winger and Hannah would star. "I love the sophisticated comedies of the late 40's, and I see this as that kind of film," said Reitman. "For years I've felt like parafin has been poured over me," said Redford. "I wanted to do something lighter."

The shoot took six weeks with a two-week break. Redford's fee was a reported $4 million and the budget more than $30 million.

"Redford takes screen better than anyone I've ever seen," said Reitman during the shoot. "To go up against him on the screen, you need someone of great substance. You need another star. And the films where you don't have someone with the strength of women like Streisand and Fonda or men like Hoffman and Newman, they get wiped off the screen. I think Debra Winger has that kind of stuff. I'm counting on that. It seems to be in the footage that we've shot so far."

== Music ==
The film's score was composed and conducted by Elmer Bernstein, his final collaboration with Ivan Reitman. The soundtrack album was released by MCA Records, featuring selections from the score re-recorded in England under the composer's baton, and the songs "Good Lovin'" by The Rascals, "Magic Carpet Ride" by Steppenwolf, and Daryl Hannah's "Put Out The Fire" (which she performs onscreen). Rod Stewart's "Love Touch" was featured in the movie, but being a Warner Bros. Records exclusive it does not appear on the album.

== Reception ==
=== Critical response ===
On Rotten Tomatoes the film has an approval rating of 41% based on reviews from 17 critics. Audiences surveyed by CinemaScore gave the film a grade B+ on scale of A to F.

Roger Ebert of the Chicago Sun-Times gave the film 2.5 out of 4, and wrote: "The movie has so much stuff in it, it's top-heavy. The wonder is that so many scenes play as well as they do."

=== Box office ===
With a production budget of $40 million, the film was one of the most expensive ever released up to that point. It grossed a total of $49,851,591 in North America and $43.3 million internationally, totaling $93,151,591 worldwide.
