= Six Days, Seven Nights =

1998 film by Ivan Reitman

- Theatrical release poster
- Directed by: Ivan Reitman
- Written by: Michael Browning
- Produced by: Ivan Reitman; Roger Birnbaum
- Starring: Harrison Ford; Anne Heche; David Schwimmer; Temuera Morrison
- Cinematography: Michael Chapman
- Edited by: Wendy Greene Bricmont; Sheldon Kahn
- Music by: Randy Edelman; Taj Mahal
- Production companies: Touchstone Pictures; Caravan Pictures; Northern Lights Entertainment; Roger Birnbaum Productions
- Distributed by: Buena Vista Pictures Distribution
- Release date: June 12, 1998 (United States)
- Running time: 102 minutes
- Country: United States
- Language: English
- Budget: $65–70 million
- Box office: $164.8 million

Six Days, Seven Nights is a 1998 American action-adventure comedy film directed by Ivan Reitman, produced by Reitman and Roger Birnbaum, and starring Harrison Ford and Anne Heche. The screenplay was written by Michael Browning. It was filmed on location in Kauai, and released by Buena Vista Pictures Distribution on June 12, 1998. The film received mixed reviews, with praise for the performances and chemistry of Ford and Heche, but criticism of the predictable screenplay. The film was a box-office success, grossing $164.8 million worldwide against a $65–70 million budget.

== Plot ==
Robin Monroe, a New York fashion magazine editor, and her boyfriend Frank are spending a week-long vacation on Makatea, an island in the South Pacific. The final leg of their journey to Makatea is piloted by middle-aged American Quinn Harris. Quinn's younger girlfriend Angelica accompanies them. On their first night on the island, Frank proposes to Robin. Later, a drunken Quinn, failing to recognize Robin, unsuccessfully hits on her.

The next morning, Robin's boss Marjorie calls and wants her to briefly interrupt her vacation to supervise a fashion shoot in Tahiti. Robin hires Quinn to fly her there. While en route, a sudden thunderstorm forces Quinn to turn back to Makatea. Lightning strikes the plane, damaging the transmitter and radio. Quinn is forced to land on a deserted island but the plane hits a large rock that damages the landing gear. The next day, Frank and Angelica join an aerial search party for their missing partners.

Hoping the island has a signal beacon, Quinn and Robin climb a high hill to disable it and bring a repair crew, only to discover that they are on a different island than Quinn thought. They spot a yacht off the coast and row out in the plane's life raft. Using binoculars, Quinn witnesses a man from the yacht being killed and thrown overboard and realizes that a second boat there belongs to pirates. The pirates see them and pursue the duo back to the island. After briefly getting captured, Quinn and Robin narrowly escape by jumping off a cliff into the ocean, then hide in the jungle. They discover a crashed World War II Japanese floatplane. Quinn and Robin get romantic.

Back in Makatea, after a few days of unsuccessful searching, a depressed Frank, believing Robin is dead, gets drunk and has sex with Angelica. The search is ended and a beachside memorial service is planned for Quinn and Robin.

Quinn and Robin salvage the wrecked floatplane's pontoons and modify Quinn's plane to leave the island. As they are about to take off, the pirates sail into sight and fire shells onto the beach, injuring Quinn. The duo are able to take off and fly over the pirates, who, shooting directly up into the air, accidentally destroy their boat when the shell lands on them. Quinn instructs Robin on how to land the plane as he may pass out due to his injury. He does, and arriving at Makatea, Robin crash lands the plane close to the beach where the memorial service is in progress. Frank is ecstatic that Robin is alive, but secretly despises himself for sleeping with Angelica. Robin visits Quinn in the hospital and confesses her feelings for him, but he says their lives are too different and they part ways.

As Robin and Frank are about to fly back to New York, she intimates there is something that makes it impossible to get married; Frank misinterprets what she is getting at and confesses he slept with Angelica. She returns the engagement ring.

Quinn rushes to the airport to find Robin, but is apparently too late, as the New York-bound plane takes off. Quinn then spots Robin, who got off. Quinn confesses his feelings for her, and they are happily reunited.

== Cast ==
- Harrison Ford as Quinn Harris
- Anne Heche as Robin Monroe
- David Schwimmer as Frank Martin
- Jacqueline Obradors as Angelica
- Temuera Morrison as Jager
- Allison Janney as Marjorie
- Douglas Weston as Philippe Sinclair
- Cliff Curtis as Kip
- Danny Trejo as Pierce
- Ben Bodé as Tom Marlowe
- Derek Basco as Ricky
- Amy Sedaris as Robin's Secretary
- Ping Wu as Infirmary Orderly
- Hoyt Richards as Model
- Kerry Rossall as Yacht Owner (uncredited)

== Production ==
The film was acquired by Caravan Pictures for Disney's Hollywood Pictures as a vehicle for Julia Roberts. Following Roberts' departure from the film, Anne Heche was cast.

Heche's involvement with the movie was confirmed days after she attended the premiere of her film Volcano holding hands with her then-partner Ellen DeGeneres. The pair's relationship led to questions as to whether Heche would remain with the film in the role of a heterosexual character romantically involved with a man, with one Hollywood agent calling the project "an important test case", adding: "There has not been a case in time where somebody has been this public about having a lesbian affair and asking us – and the public – to accept them as a female romantic lead."

Reitman sparked further publicity when he told an interviewer that Heche's relationship "will do the movie some harm". Heche later recalled confronting Reitman over the remarks, who said they were taken out of context. Heche herself admitted "there were questions" about her casting. "A gay actress has never starred in a romantic comedy before, so I can imagine that creating a little stomach buzz."

More than two decades later, Heche claimed that she was dropped from the film until an intervention by Ford. "He called me the day after they said I wasn't gonna get it, because I took Ellen to the premiere, and Harrison Ford, he was a hero. He said, 'Frankly my dear, I don't give a damn who you're sleeping with. We're gonna make the best romantic comedy there is, and I'll see ya on the set'." Despite this, she admitted that her career suffered in the wake of the film's release. "I was in a relationship with Ellen DeGeneres for three-and-a-half years and the stigma attached to that relationship was so bad that I was fired from my multi-million dollar picture deal and I did not work in a studio picture for 10 years."

The film features stunt work with aircraft. The effects were produced without CGI assistance. The crash scene of the de Havilland Beaver was performed with a Huey helicopter suspending the unmanned aircraft with a 200-foot (61 m) cable with the engine running.

Harrison Ford is a certified pilot and did his own flying in the film, after fulfilling the insurance company's training requirements.

== Reception ==
=== Critical response ===
On review aggregation website Rotten Tomatoes, Six Days, Seven Nights holds an approval rating of 40% based on 43 reviews, with an average rating of 5.4/10. The site's critics consensus states: "A generally enjoyable, if completely forgettable piece of Hollywood fluff." At Metacritic, it has a weighted average score of 51 out of 100, based on 23 critics, indicating "mixed or average reviews". Audiences polled by CinemaScore gave the film an average grade of "B+" on an A+ to F scale.

Roger Ebert of the Chicago Sun-Times gave the film 21/2-stars-out-of-4. He wrote highly of the films leads, saying Ford had "an easy appeal" and Heche exhibited "unforced charm", yet the film overall "seems cobbled together out of spare parts". Leonard Maltin called the film "an entertaining romantic comedy", and gave it three out of four stars, while observing "an obvious setup is played out with great verve by the stars."

Frederic and Mary Ann Brussat of Spirituality & Practice called the film a "humorous romantic comedy" and also praised the leads: "Harrison Ford is perfectly cast as the kind of man anyone would want around in a jeopardy situation. Anne Heche displays plenty of spunk and sparkle as a woman whose life is altered by her adventures as a castaway."

=== Box office ===
Six Days, Seven Nights grossed $74.3 million in the United States and Canada, and $90.5 million in other territories, for a worldwide total of $164.8 million.

In its opening weekend the film made $16.5 million and finished in second, then made $10.7 million and $7.7 million the following two weekends.
