= Brian Levant =

American filmmaker (born 1952)

- Born: Brian Michael Levant; August 6, 1952 (age 73); Highland Park, Illinois, United States
- Occupations: Film director; television director; film producer; television producer; screenwriter
- Years active: 1976–present
- Spouse: Alison Logan
- Children: 3

Brian Michael Levant (born August 6, 1952) is an American filmmaker.

== Early life and career ==
Born in Highland Park, Illinois, to a Jewish family, Levant started his career in 1976 as a writer for the TV series Happy Days. He also wrote for, among other TV shows, The Jeffersons, Mork & Mindy and Still the Beaver.

He is best known for directing the films Beethoven, The Flintstones and its 2000 prequel The Flintstones in Viva Rock Vegas, Jingle All the Way, Snow Dogs and Are We There Yet?.

Though his work is generally disliked by film critics, Levant has responded to the criticism with, "I'm making movies for the audience that I was when I was sitting at home watching Garfield Goose and The Three Stooges on WGN...To read those reviews is an act of self-flagellation, but reviews be damned when you're at Blockbuster, and you're seeing family after family grab one of your movies off the shelf on a Friday night. I can't tell you how many times I've seen that."

Levant is a major collector of 20th-century toys and pop culture memorabilia. His collection is displayed in a 2022 book, My Life and Toys.

== Filmography ==
=== Feature film ===
Director

- Problem Child 2 (1991)
- Beethoven (1992)
- The Flintstones (1994)
- Jingle All the Way (1996)
- The Flintstones in Viva Rock Vegas (2000)
- Snow Dogs (2002)
- Are We There Yet? (2005)
- The Spy Next Door (2010)
- Max 2: White House Hero (2017)

Writer

- Leave It to Beaver (1997)

=== Direct-to-video ===
| Year | Title | Director | Producer | Story |
|---|---|---|---|---|
| 2008 | Beethoven's Big Break | No | No | Yes |
| 2012 | A Christmas Story 2 | Yes | Yes | No |
| 2014 | Sophia Grace & Rosie's Royal Adventure | Yes | Yes | No |

=== Television ===
TV movies

| Year | Title | Director | Producer | Writer |
|---|---|---|---|---|
| 1995 | Problem Child 3: Junior in Love | No | Executive | No |
| 1995 | The Adventures of Captain Zoom in Outer Space | No | Executive | Story |
| 2009 | Scooby-Doo! The Mystery Begins | Yes | Yes | No |
| 2010 | Scooby-Doo! Curse of the Lake Monster | Yes | Yes | No |
| 2016 | The Game of Love | No | Executive | Yes |

TV series

| Year | Title | Director | Producer | Writer | Creator | Notes |
|---|---|---|---|---|---|---|
| 1976–84 | Happy Days | No | Supervising | Yes | No | Writer (14 episodes) / Producer (44 episodes) |
| 1977 | The Jeffersons | No | No | Story | No | Episode: "Jefferson Airplane" |
| 1978 | Please Stand By | No | No | Yes | No | 1 episode |
| 1979 | Brothers and Sisters | No | No | Yes | No | 2 episodes |
| 1979–80 | The Bad News Bears | No | Yes | Yes | No | Writer (2 episodes) / Producer (12 episodes) |
| 1981–82 | Mork & Mindy | No | Yes | Yes | No | Writer (2 episodes) / Producer (22 episodes) |
| 1983–89 | The New Leave It to Beaver | Yes | Executive | Yes | Developer | 102 episodes / Director (21 episodes) / Writer (19 episodes) |
| 1987 | Married... with Children | Yes | No | No | No | Episode: "The Poker Game" |
| 1988–89 | Charles in Charge | Yes | No | No | No | 2 episodes |
| 1988–91 | My Secret Identity | No | Co-Executive | Yes | Yes | 72 episodes / Writer (Episode: "Pilot") |
| 1990 | Poochinski | No | Executive | Yes | No | Unsold pilot |
| 1990-91 | Babes | No | Executive | No | No | 22 episodes |
| 1997 | Metropolitan Hospital | Yes | Executive | No | Yes | Unsold pilot |
| 2000 | Father Can't Cope | Yes | Executive | Yes | No | Unsold pilot |
| 2001 | Grounded for Life | Yes | No | No | No | Episode: "Eddie's Dead" |
