= Amy Holden Jones =

American screenwriter and film director (born 1953)

- Born: September 17, 1953 (age 72); United States
- Occupations: Film editor; screenwriter; film director
- Known for: The Slumber Party Massacre (1982); Mystic Pizza (1988); Maid to Order (1987); Indecent Proposal (1993); Beethoven (1992); The Getaway (1994); The Rich Man's Wife (1996); The Relic (1997); Black Box (2014); The Resident (2018–2023)
- Spouse: Michael Chapman

Amy Holden Jones is an American screenwriter and film director best known for directing The Slumber Party Massacre and for creating the FOX medical drama The Resident. She has edited various films and later began directing and writing. She currently works in television.

== Early life and education ==
Jones was born on September 17, 1953, and grew up in Florida. She lived in Buffalo, New York, during her high school years. She was interested in photography and wanted to study alongside Minor White who was teaching at MIT at the time. Jones attended Wellesley College in Wellesley, Massachusetts, majoring in art history, so she could also take film studies courses at nearby MIT in Cambridge, Massachusetts.

== Career ==
=== Editor (1976–1981) ===
Jones broke onto the festival circuit when she won first place at the American Film Institute National Student Festival, where Martin Scorsese was a judge, for her short documentary film A Weekend Home (1975). A year later Jones was struggling to make ends meet living in Boston due to a lack of funding for documentaries. After she read an article about Martin Scorsese beginning to produce another film, she reached out and called him, asking "Do you remember this film? Would you advise me to move to New York?" Five days later he called her back and offered her a job as his assistant during the production of Taxi Driver. It was there that she met her husband cinematographer Michael Chapman. Martin Scorsese told Jones she was “too good to be an assistant” and got her in contact with film producer Roger Corman. She went on to work for Corman editing Joe Dante's first film, Hollywood Boulevard, when she was 22 years old. She edited American Boy: A Profile of Steven Prince for Scorsese, Corvette Summer for MGM, and Second-Hand Hearts for Hal Ashby.

=== The Slumber Party Massacre (1982–1983) ===
After editing these films, Jones realized that she did not want to spend the rest of her life editing; she was frustrated with the fact that an editor can dramatically improve a film, however, it is not their film. Jones felt that she was being typed as a film editor. She was scheduled to edit Steven Spielberg's E.T. However, it was being continuously pushed back due to Poltergeist going over schedule. At this point she made a decision she has called crazy herself and decided to walk away from E.T to direct her own film. Jones promised herself she would only continue to be a film editor if she could not make her own movie. Ultimatum in mind, she approached Roger Corman about directing, asking “What would I have to do to become a director?” Corman professed that her documentary work did not show him enough of what he wanted, insisting “You have to show me that you can do what I do.” Having not written for the screen before, Jones went searching for an existing script. After scouring Corman's library of scrapped scripts, Jones took special notice of Rita Mae Brown's Don't Open the Door. Jones was especially enthralled with the eight page prologue which included the holy trifecta of exploitation storytelling: a dialogue scene, a suspense scene, and an action scene.

After rewriting some of the scenes, Jones got together a group of short ends from prior shooting projects. Her husband, a cinematographer, worked behind the camera and her neighbor was a sound technician. Jones committed herself to special effects, and she cast students from the UCLA theater department to act in the film. Over three days, Jones and her team shot the first eight pages on 35mm film. Jones edited the short on Joe Dante's Moviola after hours while he was editing The Howling. Dante also assisted Jones with temporary music cues.

Jones dropped off the nine-minute reel for Corman, confident that its three-part structure would convince him that she could fulfill all of the tropes which make up an exploitation movie. Impressed by her limited budget of just $2,000, Corman granted Jones a mere $200,000 to direct a feature-length version of the script, of which Jones had not read past the first eight pages. With her tight budget as a roadmap, Jones utilized her skills acquired as a film editor and documentary filmmaker to do an intensive rewriting of the script. But, before sitting in the director's chair, Jones underwent acting lessons with blacklisted actor Jeff Corey, a condition of all directors who worked for Corman. The shoot took 38 days across a school and two houses that were all side by side.

None of the original short made it into the final cut of The Slumber Party Massacre, because none of the actors were part of the Screen Actors Guild (SAG). But, as Jones noted, it was not needed.

=== Love Letters and writing breakthrough (1983–1993) ===
==== Love Letters (1983) ====
Jones wanted to continue to direct, however, she struggled to find any opportunities because at the time women were not typically allowed to direct films. When pushed by Roger Corman to direct her second feature, yet another exploitation film, Jones convinced Corman to aim for the art house market instead. She insisted, having been a distributor of Truffaut and Fellini films, that Corman had an already impressive art house distribution network. Plus, given the rise of home video in the mid-80s, Jones eventually convinced Corman making a film both in the art house outlet and on home video would make back the money spent. After Jones's spec script for Love Letters impressed Corman, he was on board.

Jones credits a lot of the idea behind Love Letters to her, at the time, long-distance relationship with her husband. Given that she was on the West coast, and he was on the East, letters were their primary form of communication. Jones wondered what effect those letters would have on her young daughter. Simultaneously, Jones had become fixated on Alan Parker's 1982 family drama, Shoot the Moon, about the traumas of a married man in an affair. Citing it as a male character she had seen a zillion times, Jones wondered what a film from the other woman's point of view would be like. By conjoining this concept with that of her daughter stumbling upon her and her husband's letters, Love Letters was born.

When writing the script, Jones made sure the story took place in a limited number of locations for the sake of saving money and time. Jones utilized her own house as the main location of the film. Amy Madigan was in mind for the main role during the writing process, but Meg Tilly was Jones's first choice when casting. After her falling out, Jamie Lee Curtis fell in love with the script and assumed the role, much to Jones's pleasure. James Keach was a late replacement after the first choice for the role, whom Jones has never publicly disclosed, dropped out seven days before shooting.

Jones credits the screenplays of Harold Pinter as her main source of inspiration for the film's flashback structure.

==== Mystic Pizza (1988), Maid to Order (1987), and Indecent Proposal (1993) ====
Jones's coming-of-age classic Mystic Pizza is inspired by Mystic Pizza Shack in Mystic, Connecticut. Jones envisioned Mystic Pizza to be her Diner, a 1982 bromantic comedy film by Barry Levinson, citing it as the female version of that film. She had expected to direct it and wrote it for herself to direct.

The film was optioned by Samuel Goldwyn Jr. who held onto it for years claiming that his $5,000 option gave him the rights to it for the rest of her life. As she dealt with this situation she rewrote and directed Maid to Order. Eventually Samuel Goldwyn Jr. made Mystic Pizza with a male director, however, her writing in the film received high praise for its dialogue, and she began to receive offers as a screenwriter since at the time women were more often given opportunities to write films, not direct.

Her next big writing offer was for Indecent Proposal based on the novel by Jack Engelhard, which made Jones a big-name screenwriter.

=== Television work ===
Eventually Jones began being interesting in television and pitched a show titled The Seventeenth Floor to ABC, NBC, and CBS who all wanted to buy it, however, she ended up writing the script for CBS. Next, Jones wrote a pilot for the WB during its brand switch to the CW about Harvard Medical School, entitled HMS. Although it was shot, it did not get picked up, even in light of it reportedly testing higher than any other show CW had. After this she worked on the short lived show Black Box which was still early in her television career and as such, she admitted she still had a lot to learn. Jones equates the show's plunder to summer shows not doing as well as they once did, and the fact the show wasn't filmed at its home studio, ABC Studios.

Jones is featured in the first chapter of Julie MacLusky's book Is There Life After Film School? as well as in The First Time I Got Paid for It by Peter Lefcourt and Laura J. Shapiro.

Jones is one of the creators of the acclaimed medical drama The Resident which premiered in 2018 and concluded on January 17, 2023. The Resident is a response of sorts to other medical dramas on television that she claims she got tired of watching because they are all too similar and recycle the same plot lines. She is known for accusing other medical dramas of copying The Resident, such as Grey's Anatomy and New Amsterdam. In 2019, she signed a new overall deal with 20th Century Fox TV. Jonnie Davis, President of Creative Affairs, said about Jones, “She's brimming with ideas, and we're excited to have her continued services on our series as well as her development. She's an important voice.” Coming from her deal with 20th Century Fox, she would potentially work as co-writer and co-executive producer for a new crime drama at ABC. In May 2026, Jones publicly accused ABC of using the premise of a pilot she pitched to them and ordering it as a Texas-set Grey's Anatomy spin-off executive produced by Shonda Rhimes, without giving credit to her.

== Filmography ==
Year	Title	Editor	Producer	Director	Writer	Ref.
1976	Hollywood Boulevard	Yes				
1978	Corvette Summer	Yes				
1978	American Boy: A Profile of Steven Prince	Yes				
1981	Second-Hand Hearts	Yes				
1982	The Slumber Party Massacre		Yes	Yes		
1983	Love Letters			Yes	Yes	
1987	Maid to Order			Yes	Yes	
1988	Mystic Pizza				Yes	
1991	Saturday's				Yes	
1992	Beethoven				Yes	
1992	Indecency				Yes	
1993	Indecent Proposal				Yes	
1994	The Getaway				Yes	
1996	The Rich Man's Wife			Yes	Yes	
1997	The Relic				Yes	
2007	Indecent Proposal				Yes	
2010	H.M.S. White Coat				Yes	
2014	Black Box				Yes	
2018–2023	The Resident	Yes	Yes	Yes	Yes	

Documentary appearances

- Calling the Shots (1988)
- Hollywood Women (1993)
- Headliners and Legends with Matt Lauer (2001)
- Going to Pieces: The Rise and Fall of the Slasher Film (2006)
- Trailers from Hell (2007)
- Sleepless Nights: Revisiting the Slumber Party Massacre (2010)

== Awards and nominations ==
Jones established herself in the documentary scene by winning First Place at the AFI National Student Film Festival for her short documentary film A Weekend Home in 1975. Later on in her career, she would win the Golden Raspberry Award for Worst Screenplay for Indecent Proposal in 1994. In 2019, Jones would win a Sentinel Award for The Resident Episode 220 “If Not Now, When?” alongside co-writers Tianna Majumdar-Langham and Chris Bessounian.

== Bibliography and further reading ==
- Allen, C. (Host). (2019, May 7). Amy Holden Jones, Screenwriter, Mystic Pizza, Beethoven, Indecent Proposal (No. 49) [Audio Podcast Episode]. In The Writer Experience. Flickering Myth.
- Broyles, Lindsey. “Female Authorship in the Slumber Party Massacre Trilogy,” BA diss., (University of New Mexico, 2016).
- Collum, Jason Paul. “SLEEPLESS NIGHTS: Revisiting The Slumber Party Massacre 'Don't Open the Door', Directed and Written by Jason Paul Collum (2010: Shout! Factory and B+BOY Productions) DVD.
- Maclay, Willow C. “Lined Lips and Spiked Bats: Amy Holden Jones and the Women of 'The Slumber Party Massacre',” Notebook, November 11, 2019.
- Newman, Kim. “The Slumber Party Massacre,” Monthly Film Bulletin, January 1, 1983.
