= Ivan Reitman filmography =

Works by the Canadian filmmaker

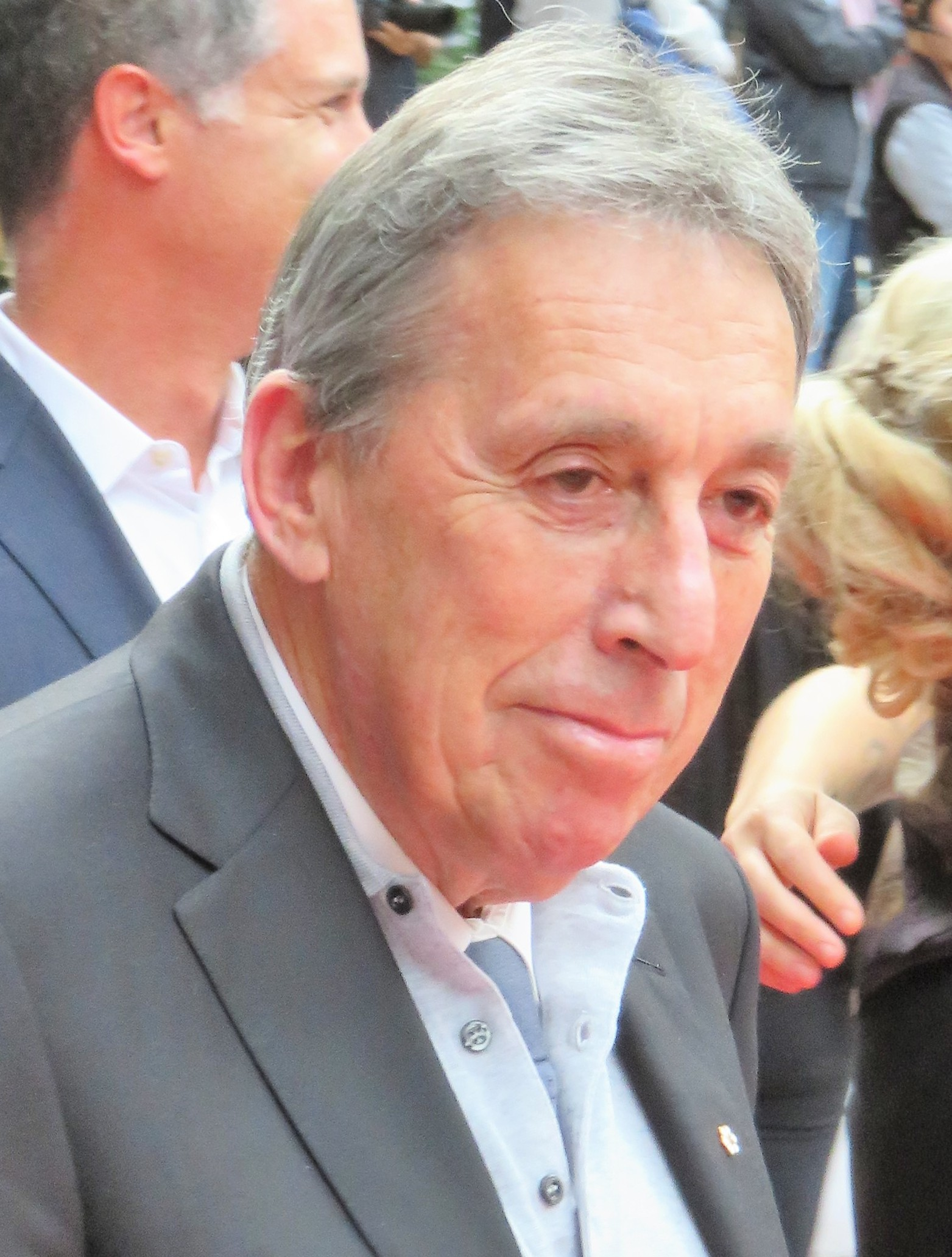
Reitman in 2018

This is the filmography of Canadian film director and producer Ivan Reitman.

== Film ==
Short film

Year	Title	Director	Producer	Notes
1968	Orientation	Yes	Yes	Also writer, editor, cinematographer and composer

Feature film

Year	Title	Director	Producer	Notes
1971	Foxy Lady	Yes	Yes	Also editor and composer
1973	Cannibal Girls	Yes	Executive	Also story writer
1979	Meatballs	Yes	No	Golden Reel Award
1981	Stripes	Yes	Yes	
1984	Ghostbusters	Yes	Yes	
1986	Legal Eagles	Yes	Yes	Also story writer
1988	Twins	Yes	Yes	
1989	Ghostbusters II	Yes	Yes	
1990	Kindergarten Cop	Yes	Yes	
1993	Dave	Yes	Yes	
1994	Junior	Yes	Yes	
1997	Fathers' Day	Yes	Yes	
1998	Six Days, Seven Nights	Yes	Yes	
2001	Evolution	Yes	Yes	
2006	My Super Ex-Girlfriend	Yes	No	
2011	No Strings Attached	Yes	Yes	
2014	Draft Day	Yes	Yes	

Ref:

Acting roles

Year	Title	Role	Notes
1984	Ghostbusters	Zuul / Slimer	Voice role
1989	Ghostbusters II	Man Walking Outside Firehouse / Slimer	Voice role
2011	No Strings Attached	"Secret High" director	Cameo
2021	Ghostbusters: Afterlife	Egon Spengler's ghost	Motion capture body double

Executive producer only

- The Magic Show (1974)
- Rabid (1977) (Also music supervisor)
- Blackout (1978)
- Spacehunter: Adventures in the Forbidden Zone (1983)
- Big Shots (1987)
- Casual Sex? (1988)
- Feds (1988)
- Beethoven (1992)
- Beethoven's 2nd (1993)
- Commandments (1997)
- Road Trip (2000)
- Killing Me Softly (2002)
- Old School (2003)
- EuroTrip (2004)
- Trailer Park Boys: The Movie (2006)
- Disturbia (2007)
- Hotel for Dogs (2009)
- The Uninvited (2009)
- I Love You, Man (2009)
- Godmothered (2020)
- Space Jam: A New Legacy (2021)

Producer only

Year	Title	Notes
1969	The Columbus of Sex	Also cinematographer
1975	Shivers	Also music supervisor
1976	Death Weekend	
1977	Ilsa, the Tigress of Siberia	As "Julian Parnell"
1978	Animal House	
1981	Heavy Metal	
1992	Stop! Or My Mom Will Shoot	
1996	Space Jam	
1997	Private Parts	
2009	Post Grad	
2009	Up in the Air	Nominated: Academy Award for Best Picture
2009	Chloe	
2012	Hitchcock	
2016	Ghostbusters	
2017	Baywatch	
2017	Father Figures	
2020	A Babysitter's Guide to Monster Hunting	
2021	Ghostbusters: Afterlife	
2024	Ghostbusters: Frozen Empire	Posthumous credit, dedication

== Television ==
Year	Title	Director	Writer	Executive producer	Notes
1997	Metropolitan Hospital	No	Creator	Yes	Unsold pilot
2004	Cooking Lessons	Yes	No	No	TV movie

Executive producer only

Year	Title	Notes
1979	Delta House	13 episodes
1994	Beethoven	13 episodes
1996	The Late Shift	TV movie
1997	Mummies Alive!	42 episodes
1999	The First Gentleman	TV movie
2001–02	Alienators: Evolution Continues	13 episodes
2006	That Guy	TV movie

Producer

Year	Title	Notes
2006	That Guy	TV movie
2008	Atom TV	5 episodes (segments "Border Patrol")

== Music video ==
Year	Title	Artist
1984	"Ghostbusters"	Ray Parker Jr.

== Documentary appearances ==
Year	Title	Notes
2004	Rated R: Republicans in Hollywood	
2015	Drunk Stoned Brilliant Dead	
2016	Ghostheads	
2019	Cleanin' Up the Town: Remembering Ghostbusters	
2020	Who You Gonna Call?	
2022	In Search of Tomorrow	Posthumous release, dedication
2023	Arnold	Posthumous release, episode: "Part 2: Actor"
