= Andrea Martin =

American and Canadian actress (born 1947)

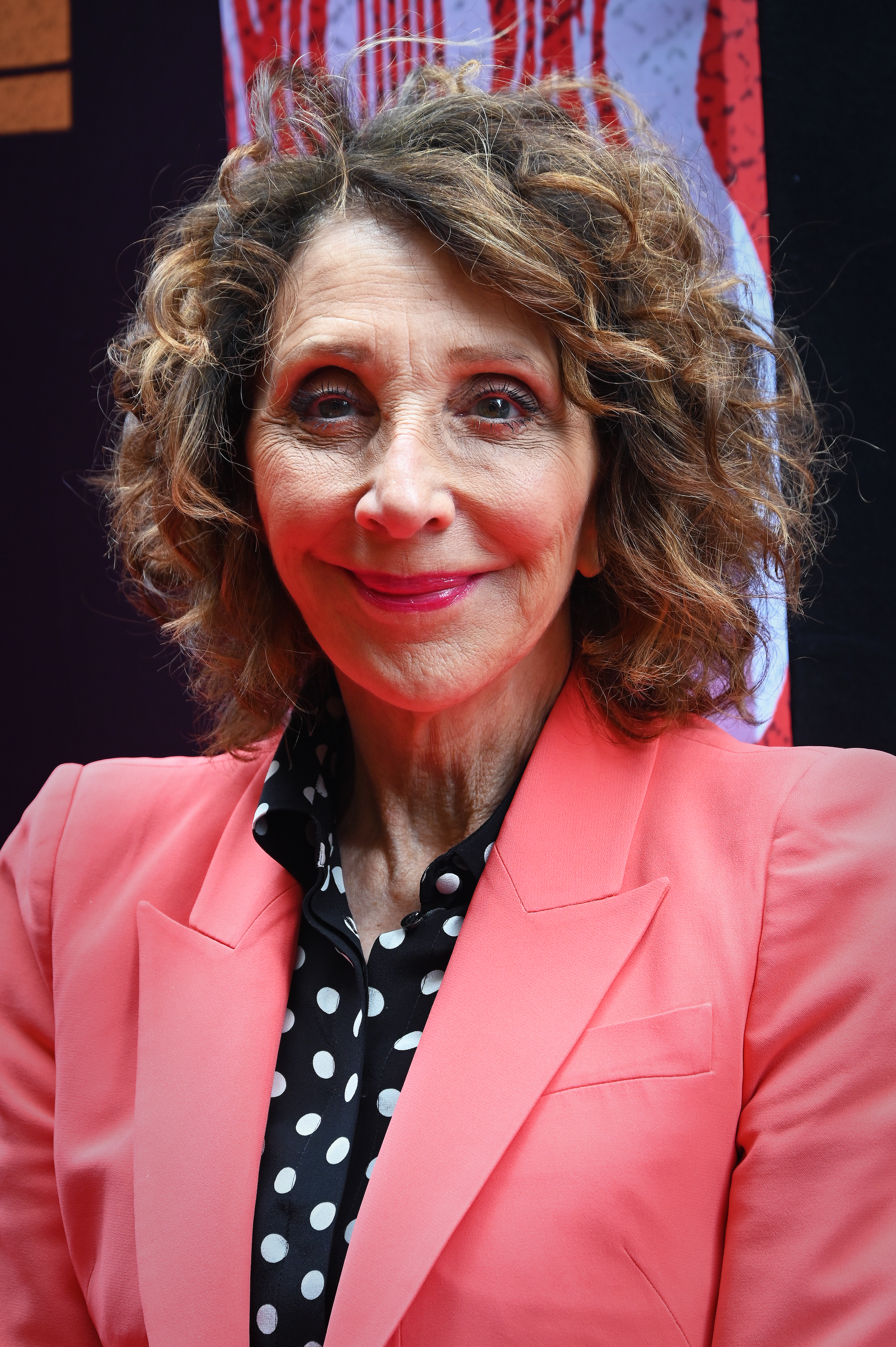
- Martin in 2025
- Born: Andrea Louise Martin; January 15, 1947 (age 79); Portland, Maine, U.S.
- Citizenship: United States; Canada (from 2017)
- Occupations: Actress; comedian; singer
- Years active: 1970–present
- Spouse: Bob Dolman (divorced)
- Children: 2, including Jack Dolman

Andrea Louise Martin (born January 15, 1947) is an American and Canadian actress and comedian, best known for her work in the television series SCTV and Great News. She has appeared in films such as Black Christmas (1974) and its 2006 remake, Wag the Dog (1997), Hedwig and the Angry Inch (2001), My Big Fat Greek Wedding (2002), My Big Fat Greek Wedding 2 (2016), Little Italy (2018) and My Big Fat Greek Wedding 3 (2023). Martin is also a prolific voice actress, lending her voice to many animated series and films, including Anastasia (1997), The Rugrats Movie (1998), and Jimmy Neutron: Boy Genius (2001). From 2021 to 2024, she co-starred in the supernatural drama series Evil. She plays a recurring role on Only Murders in the Building as of 2021.

Martin has been equally prolific in the world of theatre, winning Tony Awards for both My Favorite Year and the 2013 revival of Pippin. Martin also appeared on Broadway in Candide, Oklahoma!, Fiddler on the Roof, Young Frankenstein, Exit the King, and Act One. She has received five nominations for the Tony Award for Best Featured Actress in a Musical, more than any other actress in the award's history. She received her first nomination for the Tony Award for Best Featured Actress in a Play for the 2016 revival of Noises Off.

== Early life and education ==
Andrea Martin was born on January 15, 1947, in Portland, Maine, the eldest of three children of Armenian-American parents Sybil Martin (Armenian: Սիբիլ Մանուկեան Մարթին; née Manoogian) and John Papazian Martin (Armenian: Ջօն Փափազեան Մարթին; 1917–2010). Her paternal grandparents, from Van, present-day Turkey, had escaped the Armenian Genocide. Her maternal grandmother immigrated to the U.S. at the age of 15. Her paternal grandfather, an amateur thespian, changed the family's name from Papazian to Martin. Her maternal grandparents, who were from Constantinople, started the Armenian School at the Chestnut Street Church in Portland, Maine. Andrea's father owned Martin's Foods, a grocery-store chain. She has mentioned that although her grandparents "did not know what assimilation was," her parents worked hard to assimilate into the U.S. As such, Martin only connected with her ancestry later in life.

When she was two years old, her mother was recovering from a broken leg, so she would often read to her daughter. She and her mother would often take turns reading Shakespeare, Paul Revere's Ride, and Edgar Allan Poe's The Raven. She took piano lessons when she was eight, reciting a poem about a kitten at the rotunda of the Portland Museum of Art and playing the piano there. Martin transferred from Nathan Clifford School to St. Joseph's Academy before entering high school. She graduated from Deering High School in 1965, where she was a member of the Dramatic Club and won Miss Deering High 1965.

== Career ==
Martin won a role in a touring company of You're a Good Man, Charlie Brown. After frequent visits to Toronto, she relocated from New York City to Toronto in 1970 and immediately found steady work in television, film, and theater.

In 1972, Martin played the character Robin in a Toronto production of Godspell, with a company that included future stars Gilda Radner, Martin Short, Eugene Levy, and Victor Garber, and musical director Paul Shaffer. Two of her early film roles were in horror films, 1973's Cannibal Girls (directed by Ivan Reitman), for which she won the Sitges Film Festival Award for Best Actress, and 1974's Black Christmas.

In 1976, she joined then-unknowns John Candy, Dave Thomas, Eugene Levy, Catherine O'Hara, Harold Ramis, and Joe Flaherty on the Canadian sketch comedy television series SCTV, which was set at fictional television station "Second City Television", or SCTV, in Melonville. Martin most notably portrayed leopard print-wearing station manager Edith Prickley, whose dealings with the staff, including president/owner Guy Caballero, clueless newscaster Earl Camembert, and washed-up actor Johnny LaRue, helped to provide much of the show's humor. Other notable characters Martin played included Pirini Scleroso, an immigrant from Eastern Europe, organ saleswoman Edna Boil, feminist TV show host Libby Wolfson, and children's entertainer Mrs. Falbo. Her talent for impersonation was key in her humorous portrayals of Barbra Streisand, Anne Murray, Ethel Merman, Arlene Francis, Pauline Kael, Sally Field, Sophia Loren, Beverly Sills, Lynn Redgrave, Linda Lavin, Margaret Hamilton, Bernadette Peters, Liza Minnelli, Connie Francis, Mother Teresa, Joni Mitchell, Alice B. Toklas, Patti Smith, Brenda Vaccaro, and Indira Gandhi. In 1981, Martin was Emmy-nominated for Outstanding Supporting Actress in a Variety Show for her work in SCTV.

Her 1970s stage work eventually included the Toronto branch of the improvisational comedy troupe The Second City, a group that produced almost the entire cast of SCTV. In 1992, she made her Broadway debut in the musical My Favorite Year, for which she won the Tony Award, Theatre World Award, and Drama Desk Award for Best Featured Actress in a Musical.

Her additional Broadway credits include Candide (1997) and Oklahoma! (2002), and the Broadway premiere of Young Frankenstein (2007), all of which brought her Tony Award nominations for Best Featured Actress in a Musical.

Martin starred alongside Geoffrey Rush and Susan Sarandon in the Broadway revival of Exit the King. For her performance as Juliette, she was nominated for a Drama Desk and an Outer Critics Circle Award. She wrote and performed in the critically acclaimed one-woman show Nude, Nude, Totally Nude in Los Angeles and New York City, receiving a 1996 Drama Desk Award for Outstanding One Person Show.

Her other theater credits include the leads in The Rose Tattoo and Betty's Summer Vacation, for which she won the Elliot Norton Award for Best Actress, both produced at the Huntington Theatre in Boston. During the winter of 2012–2013, she played Berthe, Pippin's grandmother, in the American Repertory Theater production of Pippin in Cambridge, Massachusetts, singing the classic song "No Time At All". The show transferred to Broadway at the Music Box Theatre and opened in April 2013. For Pippin Martin won the Drama Desk Award for Outstanding Featured Actress in a Musical, the Outer Critics Circle Award for Best Featured Actress in a Musical and the Tony Award for Best Featured Actress in a Musical. Martin's last performance as Berthe in the Broadway production of Pippin was on September 22, 2013. She appeared on Broadway in the new play written and directed by James Lapine, Act One, for which she received the Outer Critics Circle Award.

Martin played Wanda Falbo the Word Fairy in a series of short segments on Sesame Street, debuting in 1989. The character was based on Mrs. Falbo, one of Martin's SCTV characters. She also appeared on Kate & Allie as the executive producer of a low-rated cable channel, which was spun-off into her own CBS series, Roxie. Martin is known to Star Trek fans as one of two actresses to play Ishka, Quark's mother, in Star Trek: Deep Space Nine.

Martin at SCTV Day in Toronto in 1995

Martin has won two Emmy Awards for Outstanding Writing in a Variety or Music Program in 1982 and 1983. She has done considerable voice work in animated film and television productions such as Anastasia, The Adventures of Jimmy Neutron: Boy Genius, The Grim Adventures of Billy and Mandy, Rugrats, The Secret of NIMH 2: Timmy to the Rescue, The Simpsons, Recess, The New Woody Woodpecker Show, Earthworm Jim, Kim Possible, The Buzz on Maggie, SpongeBob SquarePants, and Brother Bear 2. She also appeared in the 1993 television adaptation of Gypsy starring Bette Midler.

In 1997, Martin starred in the television series Life... and Stuff.

Her screen credits include All Over the Guy, in which she played Dr. Ellen Wyckoff—Dan Bucatinsky's therapist mother, Club Paradise, Wag the Dog, All I Want for Christmas, Worth Winning, Hedwig and the Angry Inch, Stepping Out, The Producers, and My Big Fat Greek Wedding, in which she portrayed Aunt Voula, a role she reprised in the small-screen adaptation, My Big Fat Greek Life, the 2016 sequel, My Big Fat Greek Wedding 2 and My Big Fat Greek Wedding 3 (2023).

In 2006, she played a major role in the remake of Black Christmas. She played Helaine in the 2009 breakout independent film Breaking Upwards. In the episode titled Pupil, she played an emergency room patient on the Showtime series, Nurse Jackie, which was aired July 27, 2009. In 2012, she provided the voice of Penny in the American Dad! episode "Stan's Best Friend" and appeared in an episode of 30 Rock titled "My Whole Life Is Thunder." Martin appeared in Night at the Museum 3 and Hulu's original series, Difficult People, starring Billy Eichner and Julie Klausner, and produced by Amy Poehler. It premiered August 5, 2015. She played Prudy Pingleton on Hairspray Live!, which aired on December 7, 2016.

She appears in the NBC sitcom Working the Engels.

In late 2015 to early 2016, Martin performed as Dotty Otley in the limited-run Roundabout Theatre Company revival of Noises Off, directed by Jeremy Herrin. Martin was nominated for the Tony Award for Best Featured Actress in a Play for her performance.

Martin tours throughout Canada and the United States in her one-woman show, Andrea Martin: Final Days, Everything Must Go! with her musical director Seth Rudetsky.

In 2018, Martin, along with fellow Canadians Seth Rogen and Leonard Cohen, was inducted into Canada's Walk of Fame.

Martin was set to perform on Broadway opposite Nathan Lane beginning March 2019 in the world premiere of Taylor Mac's new comedy Gary: A Sequel to Titus Andronicus, directed by George C. Wolfe. On March 4, 2019, Martin withdrew from the production, having broken four ribs in an accident during rehearsal.

In 2024, Martin appeared on Broadway, in the Lincoln Center production of Ayad Akhtar's McNeal, along with Robert Downey Jr., who played the title character.

== Personal life ==
Martin divides her time between Los Angeles and Toronto, and, in 2017, became a Canadian citizen. She was previously married to Bob Dolman and had two sons with him, Joe and Jack. She has a grandchild via her elder son. Through her marriage to Dolman, she was the sister-in-law of actor/comedian Martin Short, who married Dolman's sister Nancy.

Martin, alongside Tina Fey, is a frequent attendee of the annual Children of Armenia Fund (COAF), a benefit that aims to raise money for impoverished children in Armenia.

Martin is a close friend of Tina Fey, citing an Armenian-Greek kinship that she felt on the set of Hulu's Difficult People.

== Filmography ==
=== Film ===
Year	Title	Role	Notes	Ref.
1971	Foxy Lady	Girl Next Door		
1973	Cannibal Girls	Gloria Wellaby		
1974	Black Christmas	Phyllis "Phyl" Carlson		
1980	Wholly Moses!	Zipporah		
1982	Soup for One	Concord Seductress		
1986	Club Paradise	Linda White		
1987	Innerspace	Waiting Room Patient		
1988	Martha, Ruth and Edie	Ruth		
1988	Kid Safe: The Video	Kathy Tudor	Educational video	
1989	Rude Awakening	April Stool		
1989	Worth Winning	Claire Broudy		
1990	Too Much Sun	Bitsy		
1991	Stepping Out	Dorothy		
1991	All I Want for Christmas	Olivia		
1991	Ted & Venus	Bag Lady		
1992	Itsy Bitsy Spider	Music Teacher	Short	
1992	The Trial of Red Riding Hood	Grandma		
1993	Gypsy	Miss Cratchitt		
1996	Bogus	Penny		
1997	Anastasia	Phlegmenkoff, Old Woman (voices)		
1997	Wag the Dog	Liz Butsky		
1998	The Rugrats Movie	Aunt Miriam Pickles (voice)		
1998	The Secret of NIMH 2: Timmy to the Rescue	Muriel (voice)		
1999	Bartok the Magnificent	Baba Yaga (voice)		
2000	Believe	Muriel Twyman		
2000	Loser	Professor		
2001	Hedwig and the Angry Inch	Phyllis Stein		
2001	Recess: School's Out	Lunchlady Harriet (voice)		
2001	All Over the Guy	Dr. Ellen Wyckoff		
2001	Jimmy Neutron: Boy Genius	Ms. Winifred Fowl (voice)		
2002	My Big Fat Greek Wedding	Aunt Voula		
2004	New York Minute	Senator Anne Lipton		
2005	The Producers	Kiss Me-Feel Me		
2006	The TV Set	Becky		
2006	Brother Bear 2	Anda (voice)		
2006	How to Eat Fried Worms	Mrs. Bommley		
2006	Young Triffie	Mrs. Grace Melrose		
2006	Black Christmas	Barbara 'Ms. Mac' MacHenry		
2007	Barbie as the Island Princess	Queen Ariana (voice)		
2008	The Toe Tactic	Honey		
2009	Breaking Upwards	Helaine		
2012	BuzzKill	Lil Albright		
2012	Girl Most Likely	Stage Zelda		
2012	Delivering the Goods	Anna		
2014	Night at the Museum: Secret of the Tomb	Rose		
2016	My Big Fat Greek Wedding 2	Aunt Voula		
2016	Tom and Jerry: Back to Oz	Hungry Tiger (voice)		
2017	They Shall Not Perish	Baidzar Bakalian		
2018	Diane	Bobbie		
2018	Little Italy	Franca		
2023	My Big Fat Greek Wedding 3	Theia Voula		
2025	Fantasy Life	Helen		
2025	A Very Jonas Christmas Movie	Deb		
2026	Marty, Life Is Short	Herself	Documentary	
2026	SCTV: The Greatest Show You've Never Heard Of	Herself	Documentary	

=== Television ===
Year	Title	Role	Notes
1971	The Hart and Lorne Terrific Hour	Baffin Islander, Anthem Singer #2	Episode dated September 18
1975	King of Kensington	Wilma Willoughby	Episode: "The Joy of Kensington"
1976	The Sunshine Hour	Regular	
1976	The Rimshots		Television film
1976–77	The David Steinberg Show	Julie Liverfoot	3 episodes
1976–84	Second City Television	Various	Main role
1981	Titans	George Sand	Episode: "George Sand"
1986	Kate & Allie	Eddie Gordon	2 episodes
1987	Roxie	Roxie Brinkerhoff	6 episodes
1987–2009	Sesame Street	Wanda Falbo, Various	8 episodes
1988	The Elephant Show	Herself	Episode: "Unicef"
1988	Poison	Melissa	
1988	The Completely Mental Misadventures of Ed Grimley	Deidre Freebus	Main role
1989	The Tracey Ullman Show	Therapy Patient	Episode #3.20
1991	The Carol Burnett Show	Skit characters	
1992	Camp Candy	Mrs. Woodenhouse	Episode: "Lucky Dog"
1992	Maniac Mansion	Dr. Fontana Blue	Episode: "Idella's Breakdown"
1992	Darkwing Duck	Splatter Phoenix	Episode: "Paint Misbehavin'"
1992	Goof Troop	Mrs. Willoughby	Episode: "Goofin' Up the Social Ladder"
1992	Frosty Returns	Miss Carbuncle	TV special
1992	Boris and Natasha: The Movie	Toots	Television film
1992–2002	Rugrats	Aunt Miriam Pickles (voice)	Recurring character
1992–95	Bobby's World	Nafoodjia/Constance (voice)	3 episodes
1994	Aaahh!!! Real Monsters	Gromble's Mom (voice)	Episode: "Mother, May I"
1994	The Martin Short Show	Alice Manoogan	3 episodes
1994	Batman: The Animated Series	Mighty Mom/Lisa Lorraine (voice)	Episode: "Make 'Em Laugh"
1994	Duckman	Madame Rosebud (voice)	Episode: "A Civil War"
1995	Star Trek: Deep Space Nine	Ishka	Episode: "Family Business"
1995–96	Earthworm Jim	Queen Slug-For-A-Butt (voice)	12 episodes
1996	Duckman	Mayor Gallagher (voice)	Episode: "The Longest Weekend"
1996	Freakazoid!	Jeepers' Neighbor (voice)	Episode: "Statuesque"
1996–97	Waynehead	Ms. Neggleoff (voice)	2 episodes
1997	Life... and Stuff	Christine	Episode: "Life... and Fisticuffs"
1997	Meego	Connie	Episode: "The Truth About Cars and Dogs"
1997	The Simpsons	Mrs. Nahasapeemapetilon (voice)	Episode: "The Two Mrs. Nahasapeemapetilons"
1998	Damon	Carol Czynencko	7 episodes
1998	The Lionhearts	Additional voices	Episode: "But Some of My Best Friends Are Clowns"
1998	CatDog	Talluhla, Indian (voices)	Episode: "All About Cat/Trespassing"
1998	The Wild Thornberrys	Mother Condor (voice)	Episode: "Flight of the Donnie"
1998	Pinky, Elmyra & the Brain	Ms. Entebee (voice)	3 episodes
1998–99	Hercules	Additional voices	5 episodes
1998–2000	Superman: The Animated Series	Mad Harriet (voice)	4 episodes
1999	Timon & Pumbaa	Queen Bee (voice)	Episode: "To Be Bee or Not to Be Bee"
1999	The Outer Limits	Lil Vaughn	Episode: "Joyride"
1999	The Norm Show	Millie	Episode: "Norm vs. Death"
1999–2000	George and Martha	Martha (voice)	26 episodes
1999–2002	The New Woody Woodpecker Show	Ms. Meany (voice)	Main role
2000–01	Recess	Lunchlady Harriet (voice)	2 episodes
2001	Committed	Frances Wilder	2 episodes
2001	DAG	Betty Winn	Episode: "Basketball Jones"
2001	Primetime Glick	Anne Heche	2 episodes
2002	Just for Laughs	Edith Prickley	
2002	Ed	Kaye Pazzuti	Episode: "Two Days of Freedom"
2002	Crossing Jordan	Nora Kaminski	Episode: "Miracles & Wonders"
2002–06	The Adventures of Jimmy Neutron: Boy Genius	Ms. Winifred Fowl (voice)	Main role (37 episodes)
2003–07	Kim Possible	Mrs. Stoppable (voice)	Recurring role
2003	My Big Fat Greek Life	Voula	7 episodes
2003	Ozzy & Drix	Aunti Histamine (voice)	Episode: "Aunti Histamine"
2003	Kim Possible: A Stitch in Time	Mrs. Stoppable (voice)	Television film
2005	Chilly Beach	Lucretia Marinara	Episode: "You've Got Meat"
2005	Hope & Faith	Madame Elizabeth	Episode: "Season Finale"
2006	Kitchen Confidential	Margie	Episode: "The Robbery"
2006	Cracking Up	Carol Baxter	Episode: "The Fixer"
2006	The Grim Adventures of Billy & Mandy	Monster Wife (voice)	Episode: "Be A-Fred, Be Very A-Fred"
2007	St. Urbain's Horseman	Sarah Hersh	Episode: "Part 1 & 2"
2007	SpongeBob SquarePants	Miss Gristlepuss (voice)	Episode: "Banned in Bikini Bottom"
2009	Nurse Jackie	Mrs. Greenfield	Episode: "Pupil"
2010	Little Mosque on the Prairie	Dr. Lois Kettlebaum	Episode: "The Letter"
2010	Dino Dan	Mrs. Hahn	3 episodes
2010–11	The Cat in the Hat Knows a Lot About That!	Various	3 episodes
2012	30 Rock	Bonnie	Episode: "My Whole Life Is Thunder"
2012–13	Fugget About It	The Virgin Mary, Nonna (voices)	3 episodes
2013	Crash & Bernstein	Mother Green	Episode: "Crash on the Run"
2014	Working the Engels	Ceil Engel	12 episodes
2014	American Dad!	Sri Lankan Worker (voice)	Episode: "Now and Gwen"
2015	The Jack and Triumph Show	Elena Ekalakavarakova	Episode: "The Commercial"
2015	Modern Family	Fig Wilson	Episode: "White Christmas"
2015–17	Difficult People	Marilyn Kessler	26 episodes
2016	Hairspray Live!	Prudy Pingleton	TV special
2017	Unbreakable Kimmy Schmidt	Linda P.	Episode: "Kimmy Googles the Internet!"
2017–18	Great News	Carol Wendelson	Main role
2017–19	The Good Fight	Francesa Lovatelli	6 episodes
2019	Will & Grace	Zusanna Zoggin	Episode: "The Pursuit of Happiness"
2019	Elena of Avalor	Queen Abigail (voice)	2 episodes
2019–21	Mickey and the Roadster Racers	Mrs. Bigby (voice)	5 episodes
2020	Corner Gas Animated	Herself (voice)	Episode: "The Fat and The Furious"
2021–24	Evil	Sister Andrea	20 episodes
2021	Harlem	Robin Goodman	3 episodes
2022	Would I Lie to You?	Herself	Episode: "Child Toy Model"
2022–present	Only Murders in the Building	Joy	Recurring role
2023	The Patrick Star Show	Agnes Steelhead (voice)	Episode: "Which Witch is Which?"
2025	Overcompensating	Yates Dean	Episode: "Crown on the Ground"
2025	The Gilded Age	Madame Dashkova	Season 3
2026	Best Medicine	Judith	Season 2, Episode 1: "Be Careful What You Fish For"

=== Video games ===
Year	Title	Role	Notes	Ref.
2003	The Adventures of Jimmy Neutron Boy Genius: Jet Fusion	Ms. Winifred Fowl		

== Stage credits ==
Year	Play	Role	Venue	Notes
1969–70	You're a Good Man, Charlie Brown	Lucy	US tour	
1971	Salvation	Performer	Manitoba Theatre Center, Winnipeg	
1972–73	Godspell	Performer	Royal Alexandra Theatre and Bayview Playhouse, Toronto	
1973–74	Winnie-the-Pooh	Rabbit	St. Lawrence Centre for the Arts, Toronto	
1974–75	What's a Nice Country Like You Doing in a State Like This?	Performer	Theatre in the Dell, Toronto	
1978	Candide	Old Lady	Stratford Festival, Regional	
1978	Private Lives	Sibyl Chase	Stratford Festival, Regional	
1980	She Loves Me	Miss Ritter	Playwrights Horizons Theatre-in-the-Park, Off-Broadway	
1984	Once Upon a Mattress	Princess Winnifred	Kenley Players, Regional	
1992–93	My Favorite Year	Alice Miller	Vivian Beaumont Theater, Broadway	
1994	The Merry Wives of Windsor	Mistress Quickly	Delacorte Theater, Off-Broadway	
1995	Out of This World	Juno	New York City Center, Encores! concert	
1996	The Royal Family	Kitty Dean	Williamstown Theatre Festival, Regional	
1997	Candide	Old Lady	Gershwin Theatre, Broadway	
1998	The Matchmaker	Mrs. Levi	Williamstown Theatre Festival, Regional	
2001	Betty's Summer Vacation	Mrs. Siezmagraff	Huntington Theatre Company, Regional	
2002	Oklahoma!	Aunt Eller	Gershwin Theatre, Broadway	
2004	The Rose Tattoo	Serafina	Huntington Theatre Company, Regional	
2004	A Midsummer Night's Dream	Robin Starveling	Williamstown Theatre Festival, Regional	
2004	The Matchmaker	Mrs. Levi	Ford's Theatre, Regional	
2005	Fiddler on the Roof	Golde	Minskoff Theatre, Broadway	Replacement
2007–08	Young Frankenstein	Frau Blucher	Hilton Theatre, Broadway	
2008	On the Town	Madame P. Dilly	New York City Center, Encores! concert	
2009	Exit the King	Juliette	Ethel Barrymore Theatre, Broadway	
2009	The Torch-bearers	Mrs. Nelly Fell	Williamstown Theatre Festival, Regional	
2012–13	Pippin	Berthe	American Repertory Theater, Regional	
2013–14	Pippin	Berthe	Music Box Theatre, Broadway	
2014	Pippin	Berthe	National tour	
2014	Act One	Aunt Kate et al.	Vivian Beaumont Theater, Broadway	
2016	Noises Off	Dotty Otley	American Airlines Theatre, Broadway	
2019–20	A Christmas Carol	Ghost of Christmas Past	Lyceum Theatre, Broadway	
2024	McNeal	Stephie Banic	Vivian Beaumont Theater, Broadway	
2025	Meet the Cartozians	Rose Sarkisian	Second Stage Theater, Broadway	
2026	High Spirits	Madame Arcati	New York City Center, Encores! concert	

== Awards and nominations ==
=== Film and TV ===
Year	Award	Category	Work	Result
1973	Sitges Film Festival Award	Best Actress	Cannibal Girls	Won
1982	Primetime Emmy Award	Outstanding Supporting Actress in a Comedy or Variety or Music Series	Second City Television	Nominated
1982	Primetime Emmy Award	Outstanding Writing for a Variety Series	Second City Television	Won
1982	Primetime Emmy Award	Outstanding Writing for a Variety Series	Second City Television	Nominated
1982	Primetime Emmy Award	Outstanding Writing for a Variety Series	Second City Television	Nominated
1982	Primetime Emmy Award	Outstanding Writing for a Variety Series	Second City Television	Nominated
1983	Primetime Emmy Award	Outstanding Writing for a Variety Series	Second City Television	Won
1983	Primetime Emmy Award	Outstanding Writing for a Variety Series	Second City Television	Nominated
1983	Primetime Emmy Award	Outstanding Writing for a Variety Series	Second City Television	Nominated
1983	Primetime Emmy Award	Outstanding Writing for a Variety Series	Second City Television	Nominated
1983	Primetime Emmy Award	Outstanding Writing for a Variety Series	Second City Television	Nominated
2003	Screen Actors Guild Award	Outstanding Performance by the Cast of a Theatrical Motion Picture	My Big Fat Greek Wedding	Nominated
2022	Critics' Choice Television Awards	Best Supporting Actress in a Drama Series	Evil	Nominated
2025	Saturn Awards	Best Guest Starring Role on Television	Evil	Nominated

=== Theatre ===
Year	Award	Category	Work	Result
1993	Tony Award	Best Featured Actress in a Musical	My Favorite Year	Won
1993	Drama Desk Award	Outstanding Featured Actress in a Musical	My Favorite Year	Won
1993	Theatre World Award		My Favorite Year	Honoree
1996	Drama Desk Award	Outstanding Solo Performance	Nude Nude Totally Nude	Nominated
1997	Tony Award	Best Featured Actress in a Musical	Candide	Nominated
1997	Drama Desk Award	Outstanding Featured Actress in a Musical	Candide	Nominated
2002	Tony Award	Best Featured Actress in a Musical	Oklahoma!	Nominated
2002	Drama Desk Award	Outstanding Featured Actress in a Musical	Oklahoma!	Nominated
2002	Outer Critics Circle Award	Outstanding Featured Actress in a Musical	Oklahoma!	Nominated
2002	Elliot Norton Award	Outstanding Actress, Large Company	Betty's Summer Vacation	Won
2008	Tony Award	Best Featured Actress in a Musical	Young Frankenstein	Nominated
2008	Drama Desk Award	Outstanding Featured Actress in a Musical	Young Frankenstein	Nominated
2009	Drama Desk Award	Outstanding Featured Actress in a Play	Exit the King	Nominated
2009	Outer Critics Circle Award	Outstanding Featured Actress in a Play	Exit the King	Nominated
2013	Tony Award	Best Featured Actress in a Musical	Pippin	Won
2013	Drama Desk Award	Outstanding Featured Actress in a Musical	Pippin	Won
2013	Drama League Award	Distinguished Performance	Pippin	Nominated
2013	Outer Critics Circle Award	Outstanding Featured Actress in a Musical	Pippin	Won
2013	Astaire Award	Outstanding Female Dancer in a Broadway Show	Pippin	Nominated
2013	Elliot Norton Award	Outstanding Musical Performance by an Actress	Pippin	Won
2014	IRNE Award	Best Supporting Actress in a Musical	Pippin	Won
2014	Los Angeles Drama Critics Circle Award	Featured Performance	Pippin	Nominated
2014	Outer Critics Circle Award	Outstanding Featured Actress in a Play	Act One	Won
2016	Tony Award	Best Featured Actress in a Play	Noises Off	Nominated
2026	Outer Critics Circle Award	Outstanding Featured Performer in an Off-Broadway Play	Meet the Cartozians	Nominated

== Published works ==
- Martin, Andrea (2014). Andrea Martin's Lady Parts. Harper. ISBN 978-0062387288.
