= Eugene Levy =

Canadian actor and comedian (born 1946)

Eugene Levy CC
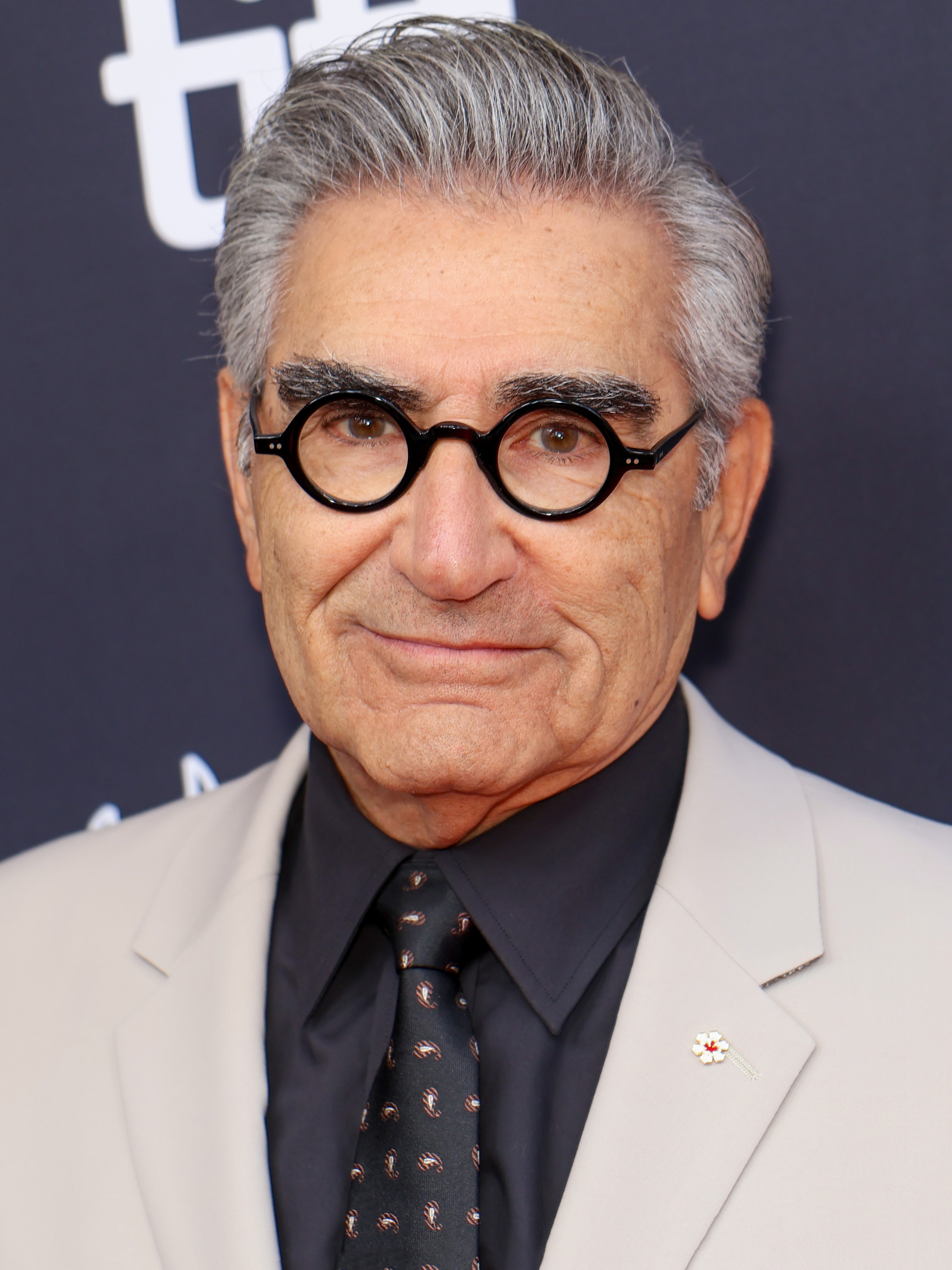
- Levy in 2025
- Born: December 17, 1946 (age 79); Hamilton, Ontario, Canada
- Education: McMaster University (BA)
- Occupations: Actor; comedian
- Years active: 1969–present
- Spouse: Deborah Divine (m. 1977)
- Children: Dan; Sarah
- Awards: Full list

Eugene Levy (born December 17, 1946) is a Canadian actor and comedian. He often plays flustered and unconventional figures. He is best known for appearing in the sketch comedy series SCTV, which aired from 1976 until 1984, and the American Pie series of films. He is a regular collaborator of actor-director Christopher Guest, appearing in and co-writing four of his films, commencing with Waiting for Guffman (1996). From 2015 to 2020, he starred as Johnny Rose in Schitt's Creek, a comedy series that he co-created with his son and co-star Dan Levy.

Levy won a Grammy Award for Best Song Written for Visual Media in 2004 for "A Mighty Wind" from the film of the same name that he co-wrote. He received the Governor General's Performing Arts Award, Canada's highest honour in the performing arts, in 2008. He was appointed to the Order of Canada in 2011. In 2019 and 2020, he was nominated for the Primetime Emmy Award for Outstanding Lead Actor in a Comedy Series, which he won in 2020.

== Early life and education ==
Levy was born to a Jewish family in downtown Hamilton, Ontario. His mother, Rebecca (née Kudlatz; 1910–1988), was a homemaker, and his father, Joseph (1909–1985), was a foreman at a car factory. He has a brother, Fred, and sister, Barbara. His mother was born in the Gorbals area of Glasgow, Scotland, to Polish Jewish parents, and later moved to Canada. His father was Sephardi Jewish, with ancestors from Spain and Bulgaria.

Levy attended Westdale Secondary School, where he was student council president. He faced antisemitic bullying, with his campaign posters defaced with the word "Jew", which he refused to take down. He subsequently attended McMaster University, graduating in 1969 with a Bachelor of Arts in sociology. He was vice-president of the McMaster Film Board, a student film group, where he met filmmaker Ivan Reitman.

== Career ==
=== 1972–1989: Godspell and SCTV ===
The 1972–1973 Toronto production of the hit musical Godspell opened at the Royal Alexandra Theatre and was intended to be a run of a few dozen performances for a subscription audience. The cast was drawn entirely from local performers, instead of a touring cast. The Toronto production launched the careers of many actors, including Levy, Victor Garber, Andrea Martin, Gilda Radner, Dave Thomas, and Martin Short, as well as the show's musical director, Paul Shaffer. Howard Shore played saxophone for this production. After an enthusiastic response from the audience, the scheduled run at the Royal Alexandra ended, and the show moved uptown to the Bayview Playhouse in Leaside. The Bayview Playhouse production ran until August 1973, with a then-record run of 488 performances.

An alumnus of both the Second City, Toronto and the sketch comedy series Second City Television, Levy often plays unusual supporting characters with nerdy streaks. Perhaps his best-known role on SCTV is the dimwitted Earl Camembert, a news anchor for the "SCTV News" and a parody of real-life Canadian newsman Earl Cameron. Celebrities impersonated by Levy on SCTV include Perry Como, Ricardo Montalbán, Alex Trebek, Gino Vannelli, Sean Connery, Howard Cosell, Henry Kissinger, Menachem Begin, Bud Abbott, Milton Berle, John Charles Daly, Gene Shalit, Judd Hirsch, Jack Carter, Muammar al-Gaddafi, Tony Dow, James Caan, Lorne Greene, Rex Reed, Ralph Young (of Sandler and Young), F. Lee Bailey, Ernest Borgnine, former Ontario chief coroner and talk show host Dr. Morton Shulman, Norman Mailer, Neil Sedaka and Howard McNear as Floyd the Barber.

Original Levy characterizations on SCTV are news reporter Earl Camembert, comic Bobby Bittman, scandal sheet entrepreneur Dr. Raoul Withers, "report on business" naïf Brian Johns, 3-D horror auteur Woody Tobias Jr., cheerful Leutonian accordionist Stan Schmenge, lecherous dream interpreter Raoul Wilson, hammer-voiced sports broadcaster Lou Jaffe, diminutive union patriarch Sid Dithers ("San Francisckie! Did you drove or did you flew?"), fey current-events commentator Joel Weiss, buttoned-down panel show moderator Dougal Currie, smarmy Just for Fun emcee Stan Kanter, energetic used car salesman Al Peck, guileless security guard Gus Gustofferson, Phil the Garment King (also of Phil's Nails), and the inept teen dance show host Rockin' Mel Slirrup.

=== 1990–2014: American Pie and other comedy films ===
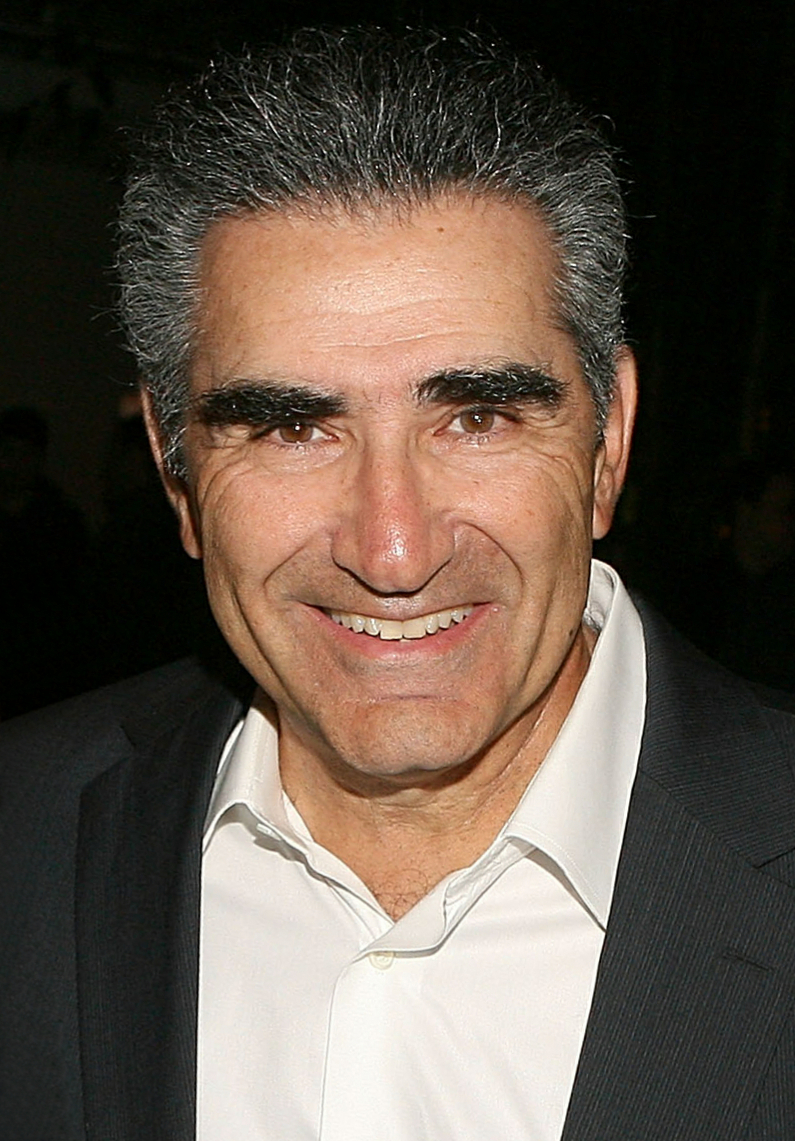
Levy in 2011

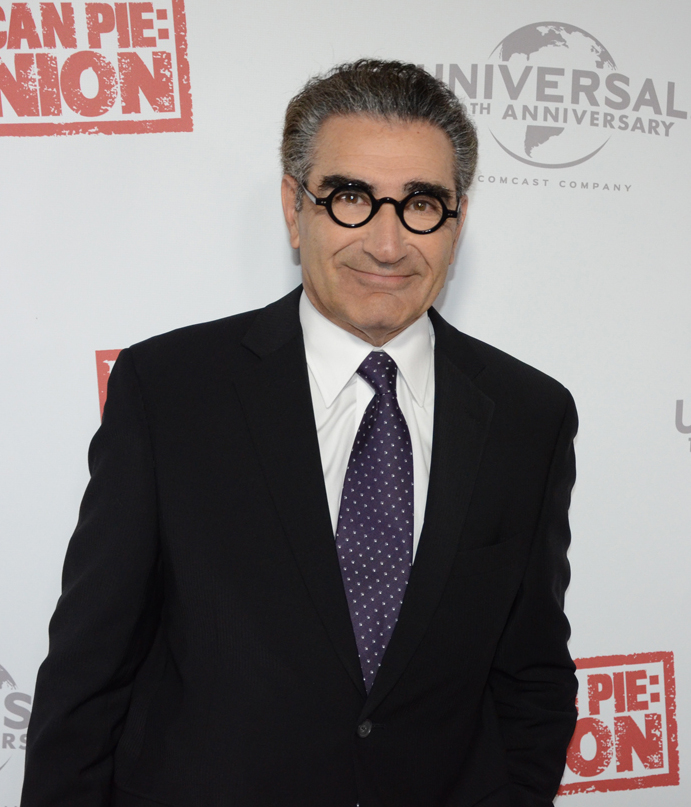
Levy at the American Reunion film premiere in 2012

Though he has been the "above the title" star in only two films, Armed and Dangerous (1986) and The Man (2005), he has featured prominently in many films. He is the co-writer and frequent cast member of Christopher Guest's mockumentary features, particularly A Mighty Wind (2003), where his sympathetic performance as emotionally unstable folksinger Mitch Cohen won kudos; his accolades included a Satellite Award for Best Supporting Actor – Musical or Comedy and the prestigious New York Film Critics Circle Award for Best Supporting Actor. Other collaborations with Guest include Waiting for Guffman (1996), Best in Show (2000), and For Your Consideration (2006).

From the 1980s through the 2010s, Levy appeared in National Lampoon's Vacation (1983), Splash (1984), Club Paradise (1986), Father of the Bride (1991), Father of the Bride Part II (1995), Stay Tuned (1996), Multiplicity (1996), the American Pie film series (1999–2012), Serendipity (2001), Bringing Down the House (2003), Cheaper by the Dozen 2 (2005), Madea's Witness Protection (2012), and other comedies. He also voiced characters in films such as Over the Hedge (2006), Night at the Museum: Battle of the Smithsonian (2009), and Finding Dory (2016). Levy was the creator of Maniac Mansion, a television sitcom based on the LucasArts video game of the same name. He was also seriously considered for the role of Toby Ziegler on The West Wing, a role that went to actor Richard Schiff.

=== 2015–present: Schitt's Creek and acclaim ===
Levy, along with his son Dan Levy, was co-creator of the CBC/Pop TV sitcom Schitt's Creek which ran from 2015-2020. He also starred in the show alongside his son as head of the Rose family, Johnny Rose. His daughter, Sarah Levy, portrayed Twyla Sands, the waitress at the Schitt's Creek diner. Eugene Levy's brother Fred was also a producer on the show.

Levy hosted and executive produced an Apple Original travel series titled The Reluctant Traveler (2023) on Apple TV+, which is now in its third season.

In 2024, Levy attended a ceremony honouring him with a star on the Hollywood Walk of Fame.

== Personal life ==
Levy married Deborah Divine in 1977. Divine's career has been in TV production. The couple have two children whom they raised in Toronto: actors Dan and Sarah, both of whom starred alongside their father on Schitt's Creek.

Levy is an advocate for autism awareness and treatment, and supports ABA methods. He was a close friend of actor and fellow SCTV cast member John Candy. Levy is a member of the Canadian charity Artists Against Racism.

In 2021, he was named honorary mayor of Pacific Palisades. In October 2022, Levy was one of the honorees of Creative Community For Peace's 10th annual gala, and also spoke at the event.

In 2025, his home in the neighbourhood was destroyed in the Palisades wildfire.

He is a supporter of Real Betis of La Liga.

== Filmography ==
=== Film ===
Key
†	Denotes films that have not yet been released

Year	Title	Role	Notes
1971	Foxy Lady	Coffee Boy	
1973	Cannibal Girls	Clifford Sturges	
1979	Running	Richie Rosenberg	
1980	Nothing Personal	Marty	
1980	Deadly Companion	Matt	
1981	Heavy Metal	Captain Lincoln F. Sternn, Male Reporter, Edsel	Voice
1983	National Lampoon's Vacation	Ed, a car salesman	
1983	Going Berserk	Sal DiPasquale	
1984	Splash	Walter Kornbluth	
1986	Club Paradise	Barry Steinberg	
1986	Armed and Dangerous	Norman Kane	
1987	Bride of Boogedy	Tom Lynch	
1989	Speed Zone	Leo Ross	
1991	Father of the Bride	Singer at Audition	
1992	Once upon a Crime	Casino Cashier	Uncredited; also director
1992	Stay Tuned	Crowley	
1994	I Love Trouble	Ray, the Justice of the Peace	
1995	Father of the Bride Part II	Mr. Habib	
1996	Multiplicity	Vic	
1996	Waiting for Guffman	Dr. Allan Pearl	Also writer
1998	Almost Heroes	Guy Fontenot	
1998	Holy Man	Guy on background TV	Uncredited
1998	Richie Rich's Christmas Wish	Professor Keanbean	Direct to video
1999	The Secret Life of Girls	Hugh Sanford	
1999	Dogmatic	Larry	
1999	American Pie	Noah Levenstein	
2000	Silver Man	Leon	
2000	Best in Show	Gerry Fleck	Also writer
2000	The Ladies Man	Bucky Kent	
2001	Down to Earth	Keyes	
2001	Josie and the Pussycats	Himself	
2001	American Pie 2	Noah Levenstein	
2001	Serendipity	Bloomingdales Clerk	
2002	Repli-Kate	Jonas Fromer / Repli-Jonas	
2002	Like Mike	Frank Bernard	
2003	Bringing Down the House	Howie Rottman	
2003	A Mighty Wind	Mitch Cohen	Also writer
2003	Dumb & Dumberer: When Harry Met Lloyd	Principal Collins	
2003	American Wedding	Noah Levenstein	
2004	New York Minute	Max Lomax	
2005	The Man	Andy Fiddler	
2005	American Pie Presents: Band Camp	Noah Levenstein	Direct to DVD
2005	Cheaper by the Dozen 2	Jimmy Murtaugh	
2006	Curious George	Clovis	Voice
2006	Over the Hedge	Lou	Voice
2006	For Your Consideration	Morley Orfkin	Also writer
2006	American Pie Presents: The Naked Mile	Noah Levenstein	Direct to DVD
2007	American Pie Presents: Beta House	Noah Levenstein	Direct to DVD
2009	Gooby	Mr. Nerdlinger	
2009	Night at the Museum: Battle of the Smithsonian	Albert Einstein Bobbleheads	Voice
2009	Taking Woodstock	Max Yasgur	
2009	Astro Boy	Orrin	Voice
2009	American Pie Presents: The Book of Love	Noah Levenstein	Direct to DVD
2011	Goon	Dr. Glatt	
2012	American Reunion	Noah Levenstein	
2012	Madea's Witness Protection	George Needleman	
2015	Being Canadian	Himself	Documentary
2016	Finding Dory	Charlie	Voice
2018	Love, Gilda	Himself	Documentary
2021	Star-Crossed: The Film	Doctor	
2024	Summer Camp	Stevie D	
2025	John Candy: I Like Me	Himself	Documentary
2026	Marty, Life Is Short	Himself	Documentary
2026	SCTV: The Greatest Show You've Never Heard Of	Himself	Documentary

=== Television ===
Year	Title	Role	Notes
1975–1979	King of Kensington	Bernie / Freddie Cohen	2 episodes
1976	The Sunshine Hour	Various	
1976–1977	Stay Tuned	Various	
1976–1984	SCTV	Various	Also writer
1985	The Last Polka	Stan Shmenge	Television film; also writer
1985	George Burns Comedy Week	Robert	Episode: "Home for Dinner"
1985	Martin Short: Concert for the North Americas	Stupid Eddie / Buddy	Voice, television special
1986	Billy Crystal: Don't Get Me Started	Morty Arnold	Television special
1987	The Disney Sunday Movie	Tom Lynch	Episode: "Bride of Boogedy"
1988	The Ray Bradbury Theater	Bert Harris	Episode: "Skeleton"
1990–1993	Maniac Mansion	Doc Ellis	Episode: "Freddie Had a Little Lamb"; Also co-creator, writer, director, and executive producer
1992	I, Martin Short, Goes Hollywood	Studio Head	Voice, television special
1992	Partners 'N' Love	David Grodin	Television film
1992	Camp Candy	Pete, Shmenge, Bruno, Stan Bobby Bittman	Voice, 4 episodes
1994	The Martin Short Show	—N/a	Directed two episodes
1995	Harrison Bergeron	President McCloskey	Television film
1996	Road to Avonlea	Rudy Blaine	Episode: "King of the Great White Way"
1996–1997	Duckman	Dr. Craig Ehrlich	Voice, 2 episodes
1997	Nightmare Ned	Mr. Nickels	Voice, episode: "Magic Bus"
1997–1998	Hiller and Diller	Gordon Schermerhorn	13 episodes
1998	Mad About You	Doctor	Episode: "Nat & Arley"
1998	Hercules	King Midas	Voice, episode: "Hercules and the Golden Touch"
1998	The Drew Carey Show	Dr. Rider	Episode: "The Engagement"
1999	The Wonderful World of Disney	Larry	Episode: "Dogmatic"
2000	Dilbert	Plug Guard	Voice, episode: "The Return"
2002	Off Centre	Dr. Barry Wasserman	2 episodes
2002–2004	Greg the Bunny	Gil Bender	13 episodes
2012	I, Martin Short, Goes Home	Mr. Mortimer Rickards	Television special
2013–2014	Package Deal	McKenzie	3 episodes
2014	Working the Engels	Arthur Horowitz	Episode: "Meet Irene Horowitz"
2015–2020	Schitt's Creek	Johnny Rose	80 episodes; also co-creator, writer, and executive producer
2020	The Ellen DeGeneres Show	Himself / Guest Host	January 10, 2020; standing in for Ellen DeGeneres
2021	Saturday Night Live	Himself	Episode: "Dan Levy/Phoebe Bridgers"
2023–present	The Reluctant Traveler	Himself	Apple TV+ travel series
2023	Human Resources	Paul Crumbhorn	Voice, 6 episodes
2024	Only Murders in the Building	Himself portraying Charles	Recurring role (Season 4)
2024	76th Primetime Emmy Awards	Himself (co-host)	Television special

=== Theatre ===
Year	Title	Role	Notes	Ref.
1972–1973	Godspell	Light of the World	Royal Alexandra Theatre, Canada	
1997	Promises, Promises	Mr. Dobitch	New York City Center, Off-Broadway	

=== Audio ===
Year	Title	Role	Notes	Ref.
1993	The Wacky World of Miniature Golf with Eugene Levy	Performer	Voice; Philips CD-i game	
1996	Creature Crunch	Brian, additional characters	Voice; PC game	
2015	R40 Live	Rockin' Mel – Host	1970s era spoofed rock show	
2020	Canada: Far and Wide	Narrator	Voice; short film at Epcot	

== Awards and nominations ==
Levy, along with Christopher Guest and Michael McKean, was awarded the 2003 Grammy Award for Best Song Written for a Motion Picture, Television or Other Visual Media for the title song from A Mighty Wind. Levy received the Governor General's Performing Arts Award, Canada's highest honour in the performing arts, in 2008.

In March 2006, it was announced that he would receive a star on Canada's Walk of Fame. In 2002, the entire cast of SCTV was given a group star, and although Levy is not mentioned on the actual star, he was still inducted as a part of the group. This makes him one of only four two-time honourees, alongside fellow SCTV alumni John Candy, Martin Short, and Catherine O'Hara. Levy is one of only a handful of people who have won at least five Canadian Comedy Awards, including two for Best Writing (Best in Show in 2001 and A Mighty Wind in 2004) and three for Best Male Performer (Best in Show, American Pie 2 in 2002, and A Mighty Wind).

In 2008, the governor general of Canada presented Levy with the Governor General's Performing Arts Awards (GGPAA), a lifetime achievement award considered "for their outstanding body of work and enduring contribution to the performing arts in Canada.". In 2010, Levy was awarded the ACTRA Award by the union representing Canada's actors. In 2011, Levy was made a Member of the Order of Canada "for his contributions as a comic actor and writer, and for his dedication to charitable causes" and promoted to the rank of Companion in 2022.

On May 22, 2012, Levy delivered a commencement address at Dalhousie University, in Halifax, Nova Scotia, and was awarded the degree Doctor of Laws (honoris causa). On June 11, 2012, Levy was presented with the Queen Elizabeth II Diamond Jubilee Medal by the lieutenant governor of Ontario.

On March 13, 2016, Levy took home the award for "Best Performance by an Actor in a Continuing Leading Comedic Role" at the 4th Annual Canadian Screen Awards, for his performance as Johnny Rose in the CBC/Pop TV sitcom Schitt's Creek.
