= List of awards and nominations received by Eugene Levy =

Eugene Levy awards and nominations
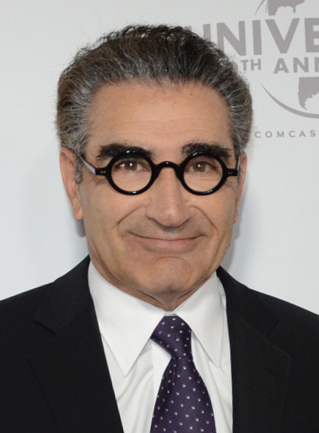
- Levy in 2012
Awards and nominations
Award	Wins	Nominations
Actor Awards	2	4
Emmy Awards	4	13
Golden Globes	0	1
Grammy Awards	1	1

Totals (Note: Certain award groups do not simply award one winner. They acknowledge several different recipients, have runners-up, and have third place. Since this is a specific recognition and is different from losing an award, runner-up mentions are considered wins in this award tally. For simplification and to avoid errors, each award in this list has been presumed to have had a prior nomination.)
- Wins: 5
- Nominations: 18

Eugene Levy is a Canadian actor, writer and comedian. Over his career he has received two Actor Awards, a Critics' Choice Award, four Emmy Awards and a Grammy Award as well as nominations for a Golden Globe Award and two Independent Spirit Awards.

Levy started his career as an actor and writer on the Canadian sketch comedy series Second City Television (1976–1984). For his work on the series he received two consecutive Primetime Emmy Awards for Outstanding Writing for a Variety Series in 1982 and 1983. He then acted and co-wrote several comedic films directed by Christopher Guest starting with Waiting for Guffman (1996) for which he was nominated for the Independent Spirit Award for Best Screenplay. He also starred and co-wrote A Mighty Wind for which he was nominated for the Grammy Award for Best Song Written for Visual Media. Levy also played a caring but naïve father in the American Pie franchise (1999–2009).

He then received acclaim for his role as the patriarch in Schitt's Creek (2015–2020) for which he won the Primetime Emmy Award for Outstanding Lead Actor in a Comedy Series and the Actor Award for Outstanding Performance by an Ensemble in a Comedy Series as well as a nomination for the Golden Globe Award for Best Actor – Television Series Musical or Comedy. He also guest-starred in the Hulu mystery-comedy series Only Murders in the Building (2025) for which he was nominated for the Actor Award for Outstanding Performance by an Ensemble in a Comedy Series.

Levy has received various honorary awards including a star on Canada's Walk of Fame in 2006 and the ACTRA Award by the union representing Canada's actors in 2010. Levy was made a Member of the Order of Canada "for his contributions as a comic actor and writer, and for his dedication to charitable causes" in 2011 and promoted to the rank of Companion in 2022.

== Major associations ==
=== Actor Awards ===
Year	Category	Nominated work	Result	Ref.
2019	Outstanding Ensemble in a Comedy Series	Schitt's Creek	Nominated	
2021	Outstanding Actor in a Comedy Series	Schitt's Creek	Nominated	
2021	Outstanding Ensemble in a Comedy Series	Schitt's Creek	Won	
2025	Outstanding Ensemble in a Comedy Series	Only Murders in the Building	Won	

=== Critics' Choice Awards ===
Year	Category	Nominated work	Result	Ref.
Critics' Choice Movie Awards
2003	Best Song	A Mighty Wind (from "A Mighty Wind")	Won	
Critics' Choice Television Awards
2020	Best Actor in a Comedy Series	Schitt's Creek	Nominated	
2021	Best Actor in a Comedy Series	Schitt's Creek	Nominated	

=== Emmy Award ===
Year	Category	Nominated work	Result	Ref.
Primetime Emmy Awards
1982	Outstanding Writing in a Variety or Music Program	SCTV Network (Episode: Moral Majority Show)	Won	
1982	Outstanding Writing in a Variety or Music Program	SCTV Network (Episode: Cycle Two, Show Two)	Nominated	
1982	Outstanding Writing in a Variety or Music Program	SCTV Network (Episode: Christmas Show)	Nominated	
1983	Outstanding Writing in a Variety or Music Program	SCTV Network (Episode: Sweeps Week)	Won	
1983	Outstanding Writing in a Variety or Music Program	SCTV Network (Episode: The Christmas Show)	Nominated	
1983	Outstanding Writing in a Variety or Music Program	SCTV Network (Episode: Towering Inferno)	Nominated	
1983	Outstanding Writing in a Variety or Music Program	SCTV Network (Episode: Jane Eyrehead)	Nominated	
1983	Outstanding Writing in a Variety or Music Program	SCTV Network (Episode: Midnight Cowboy II)	Nominated	
2019	Outstanding Comedy Series	Schitt's Creek	Nominated	
2019	Outstanding Lead Actor in a Comedy Series	Schitt's Creek (Episode: Rock On!)	Nominated	
2020	Outstanding Comedy Series	Schitt's Creek	Won	
2020	Outstanding Lead Actor in a Comedy Series	Schitt's Creek (Episode: The Pitch)	Won	

=== Golden Globe Award ===
Year	Category	Nominated work	Result	Ref.
2021	Best Actor – Television Series Musical or Comedy	Schitt's Creek	Nominated	

=== Grammy Award ===
Year	Category	Nominated work	Result	Ref.
2004	Best Song Written for Visual Media	A Mighty Wind (from "A Mighty Wind")	Won	

== Canadian awards ==
Organizations	Year	Category	Work	Result	Ref.
ACTRA Awards	2010	ACTRA Award of Excellence	Lifetime Achievement	Awarded	
ACTRA Awards	2017	Members' Choice Series Ensemble	Schitt's Creek	Nominated	
ACTRA Awards	2018	Members' Choice Series Ensemble	Schitt's Creek	Nominated	
ACTRA Awards	2019	Members' Choice Series Ensemble	Schitt's Creek	Won	
Canadian Comedy Awards	2001	Best Performance by a Male – Film	Best in Show	Won	
Canadian Comedy Awards	2001	Best Writing – Film	Best in Show	Won	
Canadian Comedy Awards	2002	Best Performance by a Male – Film	American Pie 2	Won	
Canadian Comedy Awards	2004	Best Performance by a Male – Film	A Mighty Wind	Won	
Canadian Comedy Awards	2004	Best Writing – Film	A Mighty Wind	Won	
Canadian Comedy Awards	2016	Legacy Award	Lifetime Achievement	Awarded	
Canadian Comedy Awards	2016	Best Comedy Series	Schitt's Creek	Won	
Canadian Comedy Awards	2016	Best Actor in a Continuing Leading Comedic Role	Schitt's Creek	Won	
Canadian Comedy Awards	2017	Best Comedy Series	Schitt's Creek	Nominated	
Canadian Comedy Awards	2017	Best Actor in a Continuing Leading Comedic Role	Schitt's Creek	Nominated	
Canadian Comedy Awards	2018	Best Actor in a Continuing Leading Comedic Role	Schitt's Creek	Nominated	
Canadian Comedy Awards	2019	Best Comedy Series	Schitt's Creek	Won	
Canadian Comedy Awards	2019	Best Actor in a Continuing Leading Comedic Role	Schitt's Creek	Nominated	
Canadian Comedy Awards	2020	Best Comedy Series	Schitt's Creek	Won	
Canadian Comedy Awards	2020	Best Actor in a Continuing Leading Comedic Role	Schitt's Creek	Won	
Canadian Comedy Awards	2021	Best Comedy Series	Schitt's Creek	Won	
Canadian Comedy Awards	2021	Best Actor in a Continuing Leading Comedic Role	Schitt's Creek	Nominated	
Gemini Awards	1992	Best Comedy Series	Maniac Mansion	Nominated	
Gemini Awards	1992	Best Writing in a Comedy or Variety Program or Series	Maniac Mansion	Nominated	
Gemini Awards	1993	Best Comedy Series	Maniac Mansion	Nominated	
Gemini Awards	1994	Best Comedy Series	Maniac Mansion	Nominated	
Gemini Awards	1995	Earle Grey Award (with the cast of SCTV)	SCTV	Awarded	

== Critics awards ==
Year	Award	Category	Work	Result	Ref.
2003	New York Film Critics Circle Awards	Best Supporting Actor	A Mighty Wind	Won	
2003	Seattle Film Critics Awards	Best Music	A Mighty Wind	Won	
2003	Seattle Film Critics Awards	Best Screenplay, Original	A Mighty Wind	Runner-up	
2003	Florida Film Critics Circle Awards	Best Cast	A Mighty Wind	Won	
2003	Phoenix Film Critics Society Awards	Best Ensemble Cast	A Mighty Wind	Nominated	

== Miscellaneous awards ==
Organizations	Year	Category	Work	Result	Ref.
Behind the Voice Actors Awards	2016	Best Vocal Ensemble in a Feature Film	Finding Dory	Won	
Blockbuster Entertainment Awards	2000	Favourite Supporting Actor, Comedy	American Pie	Won	
CableACE Awards	1984	Writing a Comedy or Music Program	SCTV Channel	Nominated	
CableACE Awards	1985	Ace Award for Best Comedy Special	The Last Polka	Nominated	
CableACE Awards	1985	Performance in a Comedy Special	The Last Polka	Nominated	
CableACE Awards	1989	Directing a Comedy Special	Biographies: The Enigma of Bobby Bittman	Nominated	
CableACE Awards	1989	Writing a Comedy Special	Biographies: The Enigma of Bobby Bittman	Nominated	
DVD Exclusive Awards	2006	Best Supporting Actor in a DVD Premiere Movie	American Pie Presents: Band Camp	Nominated	
Gotham Independent Film Award	2006	Best Ensemble Cast	For Your Consideration	Nominated	
Independent Spirit Award	1998	Best Screenplay	Waiting for Guffman	Nominated	
Independent Spirit Award	2003	Best Screenplay	A Mighty Wind	Nominated	
Kids' Choice Awards	2016	#Squad	Finding Dory	Won	
Sitges Film Festival	1973	Medalla Sitges en Plata de Ley for Best Actor	Cannibal Girls	Won	
Teen Choice Awards	2003	Choice Movie Chemistry	Bringing Down the House	Nominated	
Teen Choice Awards	2003	Choice Movie Liar	New York Minute	Nominated	
Producers Guild of America	2020	Outstanding Producer of Episodic Television – Comedy	Schitt's Creek	Nominated	
Satellite Awards	2019	Best Actor in a Series, Comedy or Musical	Schitt's Creek	Nominated	
Satellite Awards	2021	Best Actor in a Musical or Comedy Series	Schitt's Creek	Nominated	
Writers Guild of America Awards	2000	Best Screenplay	Best in Show	Nominated	

== Honorary awards ==
Organizations	Year	Award	Result	Ref.
Governor General of Canada	2008	Governor General's Performing Arts Award	Honored	
Banff World Media Festival	2011	Award of Excellence	Honored	
Banff Television Festival	2019	Sir Peter Ustinov Awards	Honored	
Newport Beach Film Festival	2020	Lifetime Achievement Award	Honored	
