= Alan Gordon (actor) =

British actor

- Born: Canada
- Occupation: Actor

Alan Gordon is a Canadian actor, known for his roles in several films. including Foxy Lady (1971), where he falls for actress Sylvia Feigel, Cannibal Girls (1973), and Easy Money (1983).

He has also appeared in television series, most notably Law & Order.
