= Vanya and Sonia and Masha and Spike =

2012 comedy play by Christopher Durang

- Written by: Christopher Durang
- Characters: Vanya; Masha; Spike; Sonia; Nina; Cassandra

Premiere
- Date: September 7, 2012
- Place: McCarter Theatre, Princeton, New Jersey

Vanya and Sonia and Masha and Spike is a comedy play written by Christopher Durang. The story revolves around the relationships of three middle-aged single siblings, two of whom live together (Vanya and Sonia), and takes place during a visit by the third, Masha, who supports them. They discuss their lives and loves, argue, and Masha threatens to sell the house. Some of the show's elements were derived from works of Anton Chekhov, including several character names and sibling relationships, the play's setting in a country house (in Bucks County, Pennsylvania) with a vestigial cherry orchard, the performance of an "avant-garde" play by one of the main characters (as in The Seagull), and the themes of old vs. new generations, real vs. assumed identities, the challenges of a woman growing older after successes in a career that seems to be ending, the hope and carelessness of youth, intrafamilial rivalries, and the possible loss of an ancestral home.

The play premiered at McCarter Theatre in Princeton, New Jersey in 2012, followed by an Off-Broadway production later the same year. It transferred to Broadway in 2013. The original McCarter, Off-Broadway, and Broadway casts included David Hyde Pierce, Kristine Nielsen, Sigourney Weaver and Billy Magnussen. Subsequently, the play has been produced in Alabama, Alaska, Arizona, California, Colorado, Connecticut, Georgia, the District of Columbia, Indiana, Massachusetts, Minnesota, Missouri, Oregon, South Carolina, Tennessee, Washington, Wyoming, and Ontario.

Critics praised Vanya and Sonia and Masha and Spike as a humorous adaptation of Chekhov themes that doesn't require familiarity with Chekhov. The original Broadway production proved to be a commercial success, recouping its $2.75 million investment in under four months. In 2013, it won the Tony Award for Best Play and the Drama Desk Award for Outstanding Play, among other awards.

== Plot ==
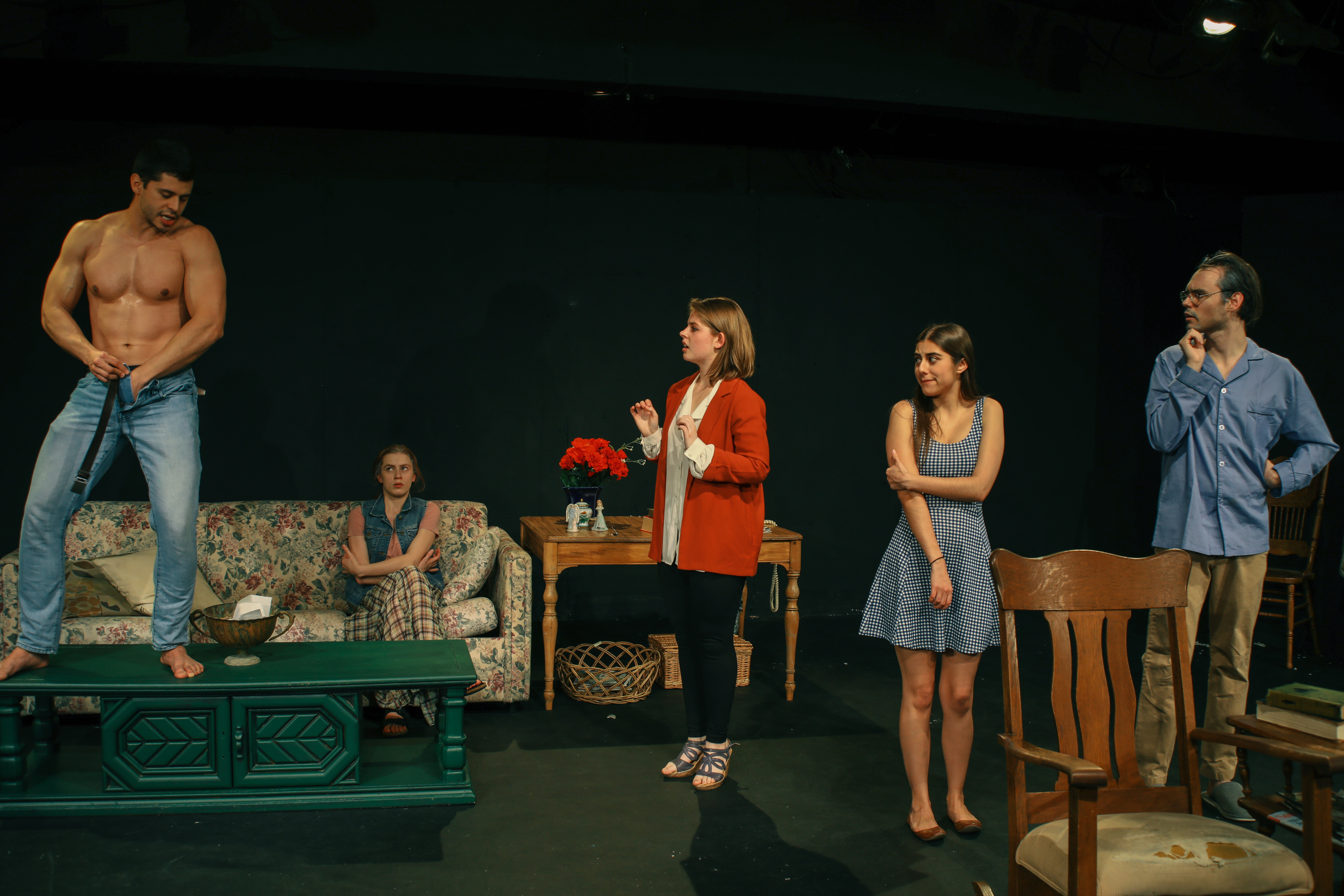
Scene from a 2019 production of the play at the Stella Adler Academy of Acting and Theatre

Middle-aged siblings Vanya and Sonia live in the family home in Bucks County, Pennsylvania. Named after Chekhov's characters by their theater-enthusiast professor parents, Vanya and Sonia have not had to grow up. After spending their adulthood looking after their now-dead parents, neither has a job, and money is provided by their movie star sister Masha, who owns the house and pays the bills. Vanya (who is gay) and Sonia (who is forever reminding everyone that she was adopted) spend their days reflecting on their lost chances, debating whether the grove of nine cherry trees on their property constitutes an orchard, and bemoaning their rather Chekhovian lot in life. The only other resident of the house is their cleaning woman Cassandra, who, like her namesake, is prone to making dire prophecies that no one believes. This static environment is disrupted when Masha returns home, bringing with her a flurry of drama, an endless litany of insecurity, and a much younger, gorgeous, dimwitted lover named Spike. Sonia's resentments and Masha's competitive nature begin to spark arguments, and while Vanya tries to keep the peace, he is repeatedly distracted by the preening Spike, who takes every opportunity possible to strip down and show off his muscular body. Masha's fifth marriage has recently ended and her career is starting to stall. Spike's career has never started, and his biggest claim to fame is nearly landing a part in the sequel to Entourage, Entourage 2. Another interloper arrives, the neighbor's pretty niece Nina, an aspiring actress who provokes envy in Masha, lust in Spike, and sympathy in Vanya.

Masha has returned home to attend a costume party at an influential neighbor's house and insists that her friends and family dress as characters from Disney's animated Snow White and the Seven Dwarfs, choosing to dress as Snow White. When told she will be going as one of the dwarfs, Sonia rebels and dresses up as the Evil Queen, imagining her as portrayed by Maggie Smith on her way to the Oscars. As they prepare for the party, Masha tells them she intends to sell the house, leaving Vanya and Sonia devastated.

Things come to a head the day after the party. As Cassandra uses a voodoo doll on Masha, trying to dissuade thoughts of selling the house, Sonia receives a phone call from a man she met at the party, requesting a date. Hesitantly, she accepts. Vanya, who is secretly writing a play inspired by Konstantin's imagined symbolist drama in The Seagull, is convinced by Nina to let her read it in front of the others. During the reading (which stars Nina as a molecule and takes place after the destruction of the earth), Spike rudely answers a text on his phone, and dismisses Vanya's suggestion of a handwritten response. Vanya reacts by launching into an impassioned rant, criticizing America's cultural regression in communication and media, while fondly and wistfully recalling the surroundings and memories of his childhood. Concluding that the intent of such progress seems to make people like him feel lost and forgotten, he retreats into the kitchen in tears.

Masha realizes that the person Spike is texting is her personal assistant, with whom he has been having an affair. She ends her relationship with him and kicks him out of the house, announcing she no longer intends to sell it. As the play ends, the three siblings, optimistic for the first time in a very long time, sit quietly together and listen to The Beatles' song "Here Comes the Sun".

== Characters ==
According to Durang, "My play is not a Chekhov parody...I take Chekhov scenes and characters and put them into a blender." Although the characters in the play, named by university professors, share names with Chekhov characters, they are not the same characters. They share some elements but are fully imagined. Durang mentioned that Masha is more like Madame Arkadina in The Seagull than any of Chekhov's characters named Masha. Rather than mimic Three Sisters, his play has a sister, brother and adopted sister, with the latter two being the most Chekhovian of the title characters. Durang has described Nina as most like a Chekhov character, and related to the character of the same name in The Seagull. After five marriages to her contemporaries, Masha has taken up with Spike in a May–December relationship. Durang says that "Cassandra, who's a cleaning woman and soothsayer, is like the Greek-tragedy Cassandra. In some ways, she's like the nanny in Vanya, but she doesn't reflect Chekhov as much."

=== Principal roles and original cast ===
Character	Original Broadway cast
Masha	Sigourney Weaver
Vanya	David Hyde Pierce
Sonia	Kristine Nielsen
Spike	Billy Magnussen
Cassandra	Shalita Grant
Nina	Genevieve Angelson

== Production history ==
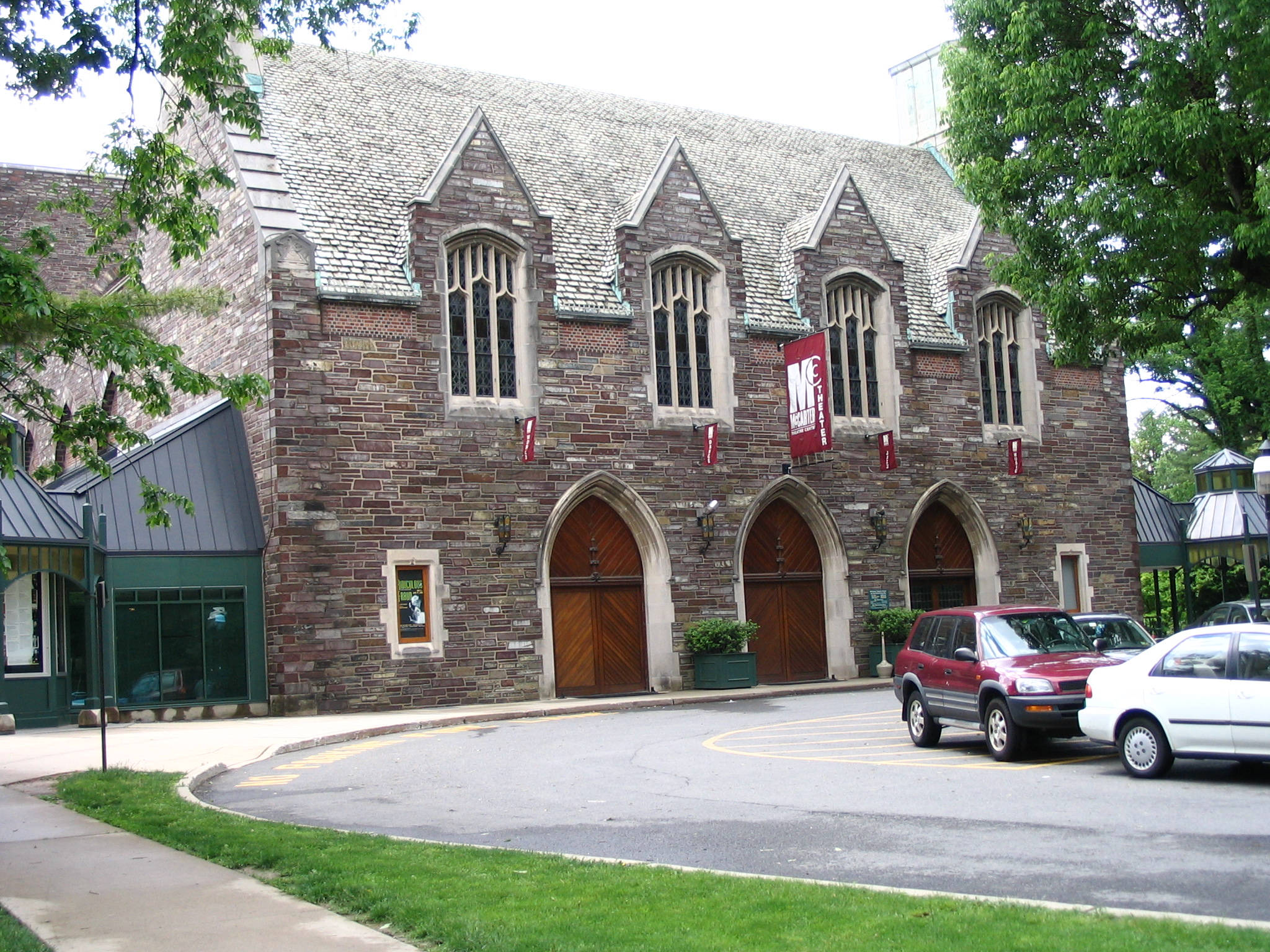
Vanya and Sonia and Masha and Spike was commissioned by the McCarter Theatre.

Vanya and Sonia and Masha and Spike was commissioned by the McCarter Theatre, Princeton, New Jersey, in association with the Lincoln Center Theater. The play, which was originally a one-act play, ran at the McCarter Theatre from September 7, 2012, to October 14, 2012.

The play opened Off-Broadway at Lincoln Center's Mitzi E. Newhouse Theater on November 12, 2012, after previews from October 25, and ran until January 20, 2013. The show's run at Lincoln Center was sold out. On January 29, it was announced that the show would transfer to Broadway for 17 weeks beginning March 5 with its original cast under the production of Joey Parnes, Larry Hirschhorn, and John O'Boyle, in association with McCarter Theatre and Lincoln Center Theater.

It opened on Broadway on March 14, 2013, at the John Golden Theatre, after previews beginning March 5. The Broadway engagement, originally announced to close on June 30, was extended to July 28, 2013 and again to August 25. On July 1, the show recouped its $2.75 million investment. The play closed on August 25, 2013, after 189 performances on Broadway. "The house changed with each of the play's moves, first from McCarter Theatre's proscenium stage to Newhouse Theater's smaller thrust stage, then to the Golden Theatre's proscenium stage. The actors had to make adjustments to compensate for the changes. Nielsen and Pierce both said that the proscenium accentuated their comedic performances.

The original Off-Broadway and Broadway casts featured Pierce as Vanya, Weaver as Masha, Magnussen as Spike, Nielsen as Sonia, Angelson as Nina, and Grant as Cassandra. The play was directed by Nicholas Martin with the set designed by David Korins and costumes by Emily Rebholz. On July 28, Weaver left the cast and was replaced by Julie White as Masha. Magnussen departed the cast on August 4 and was replaced by understudy Creed Garnick as Spike.

Following its Broadway run, the show ran at Berkeley, California's Berkeley Repertory Theatre in September and October 2013 with Anthony Fusco as Vanya, Sharon Lockwood as Sonia, Lorri Holt as Masha, and Mark Junek as Spike. Hyde Pierce reunited with the show to direct the January 29 – March 9, 2014, production at Los Angeles' Mark Taper Forum by Center Theatre Group. The cast was Mark Blum, Christine Ebersole, Grant, David Hull, Nielsen and Liesel Allen Yaeger.

In September/October 2013, a separate production ran in the Phoenix Theatre, Indianapolis, produced by Bryan Fonseca. In 2014, the show ran at the Guthrie Theater in Minneapolis, and in Tucson and Phoenix, Arizona. The show was produced in Seattle at the ACT Theatre from October 17 – November 16, 2014.

Playwright Durang starred as Vanya alongside Marilu Henner as Masha in a production at the Bucks County (where the play takes place) Playhouse from July 17 to August 10, 2014.

Theatre Royal, Bath staged the first UK production of the play in 2019, directed by Walter Bobbie and starring Janie Dee as Masha. Following a delayed March 2020 opening due to the COVID-19 pandemic, the production played Off West End in London at the Charing Cross Theatre in fall 2021. The production featured the original design team of Korins, Emily Rebholz, Justin Townsend, and Mark Bennett reprising their roles.

A benefit staged reading, directed by Bartlett Sher in place of the late Nicholas Martin, took place at Lincoln Center's Vivian Beaumont Theatre on May 7, 2024 on the set of the theater's production of Uncle Vanya. Nielsen, Weaver, and Hyde Pierce reprised their roles, with David Hull from the Center Theatre Group production taking over as Spike, and Liesel Allen Yeager and Linda Lavin taking on the roles of Nina and Cassandra from the previously announced original cast members Genevieve Angelson and Shalita Grant.

== Themes ==
Although Vanya and Sonia and Masha and Spike is a comedy, it has some darker elements that pervade its themes. Ben Brantley of The New York Times described the play as a "sunny new play about gloomy people". Patrick Healy of The New York Times described it as a "black comedy about unhappy siblings".

According to Robin Pogrebin of The New York Times, "The play sets characters and themes from Chekhov in present day Bucks County, PA." The characters Vanya, Sonia and Masha are middle-aged siblings named after Chekhov characters. Their deceased parents were "college professors who dabbled in community theater". The character names are borrowed from Chekhov plays. Vanya is the protagonist in Uncle Vanya and Sonia is his niece. Meanwhile, Masha comes from Chekhov's Three Sisters. Other characters also embody the themes and characters from Chekhov works, such as Nina from The Seagull. The play depicts a home of siblings who have quarreled their entire lives.

According to Charles Isherwood of The New York Times, not only are the character names derived from Chekhov, but also "The country-house setting is also borrowed from the work of that Russian master, as are the self-delusions and self-pity that plague the central characters, all of whom have reached the difficult age when life’s path has narrowed uncomfortably, and there is little point in turning around and looking to take another, more rewarding course."

== Critical review ==
Knowledge of Chekhov will increase the enjoyment of this work's in-jokes, but not as much as an understanding of Durang's absurdism, according to Theatermania.com's Brian Scott Lipton. Brantley noted that the work was suitable for any audience: "Even if you’ve never read a word of Chekhov, you're likely to find plenty to make you laugh: Mr. Hyde Pierce's skillfully low-key comic discomfort; Ms. Nielsen's segues from manic eruption into glazed smiling stupor; Ms. Weaver's game sendup of every self-loving, self-doubting movie queen there ever was." He noted the play does not compare with some of Durang's most absurd work, calling it "blander and thinner". Brantley said there was comfort in an evening of deliverance of Chekhov's "lost souls", by Durang.

Isherwood noted that as Nielsen demonstrated her ability to lighten the play's stream of Chekhovian themes, "broad comic acting [was] raised to the level of high art." He also noted that in Durang's plays, "heartache is generally fodder for belly laughs" and that Vanya and Sonia and Masha and Spike had plenty. Lipton noted that the show was quite funny, but also belabored and "scattershot". Several reviewers agreed that the show was "a bit of a patchwork".

According to the New York Post critic, Elisabeth Vincentelli, the show improved with its transfer from Off-Broadway to Broadway, especially Weaver's performance, which Vincentelli deemed the weakest. Weaver portrayed a movie star who was "overindulgent, self-centered, and unaware she's on the decline." Mark Kennedy of The Washington Post suggested Durang, with whom Weaver graduated from the Yale School of Drama in 1974, may have written the role for her. Both Hyde Pierce and Nielsen exhibited mastery of their monologues, according to Vincentelli: "Hyde Pierce is a master of the slow burn, while Nielsen's wild-eyed Sonia often looks as if her train of thought has a loose caboose." Vincentelli also noted that Weaver's character had "turned her life into a performance."

== Awards and nominations ==
The play received six Tony Award nominations for the 67th Tony Awards, winning the Tony Award for Best Play. Magnussen earned his first Tony nomination for his role. Grant also earned her first Tony nomination. The play won the 58th Drama Desk Award for Outstanding Play and the 2013 New York Drama Critics' Circle Award for Best Play. Grant received a Theatre World Award for Best Debut Performance. Emily Rebholz earned a 2013 Lucille Lortel Award nomination for Outstanding Costume Design of the Off-Broadway production.

The Off-Broadway and Original Broadway productions were jointly recognized with Drama League Award nominations for Outstanding Production of a Broadway or Off-Broadway Play and with Distinguished Performance Award nominations for both Nielsen and Pierce; the play won for Outstanding Production of a Broadway or Off-Broadway Play. The production received four Outer Critics Circle Award nominations: Outstanding New Broadway Play, Outstanding Director of a Play (Martin), Outstanding Actor in a Play (Pierce), and Outstanding Featured Actress in a Play (Nielsen), and won the awards for Outstanding New Broadway Play and Outstanding Featured Actress in a Play. The production won the 2013 Off-Broadway Alliance Award for Best New Play. The show received an Artios Award from The Casting Society of America for Outstanding Achievement in Casting, New York Broadway Theatre – Comedy.

=== Original Broadway & Off-Broadway productions ===
Year	Award	Category	Nominee	Result	ref
2013	Tony Award (67th)	Best Play		Won	
2013	Tony Award (67th)	Best Actor in a Play	David Hyde Pierce	Nominated	
2013	Tony Award (67th)	Best Actress in a Play	Kristine Nielsen	Nominated	
2013	Tony Award (67th)	Best Featured Actor in a Play	Billy Magnussen	Nominated	
2013	Tony Award (67th)	Best Featured Actress in a Play	Shalita Grant	Nominated	
2013	Tony Award (67th)	Best Direction of a Play	Nicholas Martin	Nominated	
2013	Lucille Lortel Award	Outstanding Costume Design	Emily Rebholz	Nominated	
2013	Drama League Award	Outstanding Production of a Broadway or Off-Broadway Play		Won	
2013	Drama League Award	Distinguished Performance Award	Kristine Nielsen	Nominated	
2013	Drama League Award	Distinguished Performance Award	David Hyde Pierce	Nominated	
2013	Outer Critics Circle Award	Outstanding New Broadway Play		Won	
2013	Outer Critics Circle Award	Outstanding Director of a Play	Nicholas Martin	Nominated	
2013	Outer Critics Circle Award	Outstanding Actor in a Play	David Hyde Pierce	Nominated	
2013	Outer Critics Circle Award	Outstanding Featured Actress in a Play	Kristine Nielsen	Won	
2013	Drama Desk Award	Outstanding Play		Won	
2013	New York Drama Critics' Circle Awards	Best Play	Christopher Durang	Won	
2013	Theatre World Award	Best Debut Performance	Shalita Grant	Won	
2013	Off-Broadway Alliance Awards	Best New Play		Won	
2013	Artios Award	Outstanding Achievement in Casting; New York Broadway Theatre – Comedy	Daniel Swee	Won	
