= Betty's Summer Vacation =

Play

Betty's Summer Vacation is a play by Christopher Durang, which premiered Off-Broadway at Playwrights Horizons in 1999. Playbill observed that "The play is a fierce comeback for Durang, whose 'Sex and Longing' took a drubbing at Lincoln Center two seasons ago."

== Production history ==
The play premiered Off-Broadway at Playwrights Horizons, on February 19, 1999 (previews), officially on March 14 and closed on April 18, 1999, after 3 extensions. Directed by Nicholas Martin, the cast featured Kellie Overbey as Betty, Kristine Nielsen (Mrs. Siezmagraff), Geneva Carr, and Guy Boyd (Mr. Vanislaw).

Durang won a 1998-99 Obie Award, Playwriting, as did Nicholas Martin (Direction), and Kristine Nielsen, Performance.

Under the direction of Nicholas Martin, the play was produced by the Huntington Theatre Company, Boston, in October to November 2001, with Andrea Martin playing Mrs. Siezmagraff.

The play was produced at Bay Street Theatre, Sag Harbor, New York, in July 2011. Trip Cullman directed the 9-member cast, which starred Heidi Shreck as Betty and Veanne Cox as Mrs. Siezmagraff. The cast also included Bobby Steggert, John Behlmann, Celia Keenan-Bolger, Tom Riis Farrell, Tim Intravia, Kate O'Phalen, and Jacob Hoffman.

== Plot ==
When Betty signs up for a summer timeshare with her garrulous mate, Trudy, she is in need of peace and quiet to contrast her stressful life as a single, city-dwelling young woman of the '90s. Tranquility ceases, alas, within moments of her arrival at the beach house by way of Trudy's broken promise to “not talk too much;” a sudden, inexplicable laugh track from an unknown source; and the arrival of the other guests: (1) Keith, a shy, bisexual serial killer who maintains a collection of body parts and hat boxes; (2) Mrs. Siezmagraff, the landlady and, apparently, Trudy's mother, who, apparently, responded with jealousy when Trudy was apparently serially molested by the alcoholic, wife-beating, recently deceased Mr. Siezmagraff; (3) Buck, an unashamedly horny frat-like lout; and finally (4) Mr. Vanislaw, a flasher befriended by Mrs. Siezmagraff after a recent fitting-room photography incident.

What starts off with a mildly disturbing game of charades escalates into Trudy and Keith castrating and beheading, respectively, Mr. Vanislaw, whose penis is now being stored in the freezer, and Buck who is incited by The Three Figures from the laugh track into attempted rape on Keith. Climactically, the laugh track voices burst out of the ceiling, demanding a Court TV-style trial of Trudy and Keith, which Mrs. Siezmagraff quite happily and manically provides. Ultimately, Trudy and Keith, under the influence of the voices, blow up the house, leaving Betty alone on the beach to find peace and tranquility as she listens to the sound of the waves.

== Critical response ==
Playbill observed that " 'Betty's Summer Vacation' represented playwright Christopher Durang's biggest critical success in years when it premiered Off Broadway in 1999 under Nicholas Martin's direction."

Ben Brantley, in his review of the 1999 production for The New York Times, called the play a "heavenly hell of a production". Brantley went on to write "Please welcome Mr. Durang back to the ranks of America's liveliest living playwrights....What Mr. Martin and his crack cast...provide is a pure physical charge of pathological energy that comes from highly animated human presences."

The reviewer of the Huntington Theatre Company production for Boston Phoenix.com wrote that the play "seems both merrily horrifying and a little silly.... 'Betty’s Summer Vacation', albeit too Court TV-specific in the second act for its own shelf life, may be the pinnacle of the audacious lampoonery in which he [Durang] specializes."
