= Kristine Nielsen =

American actress

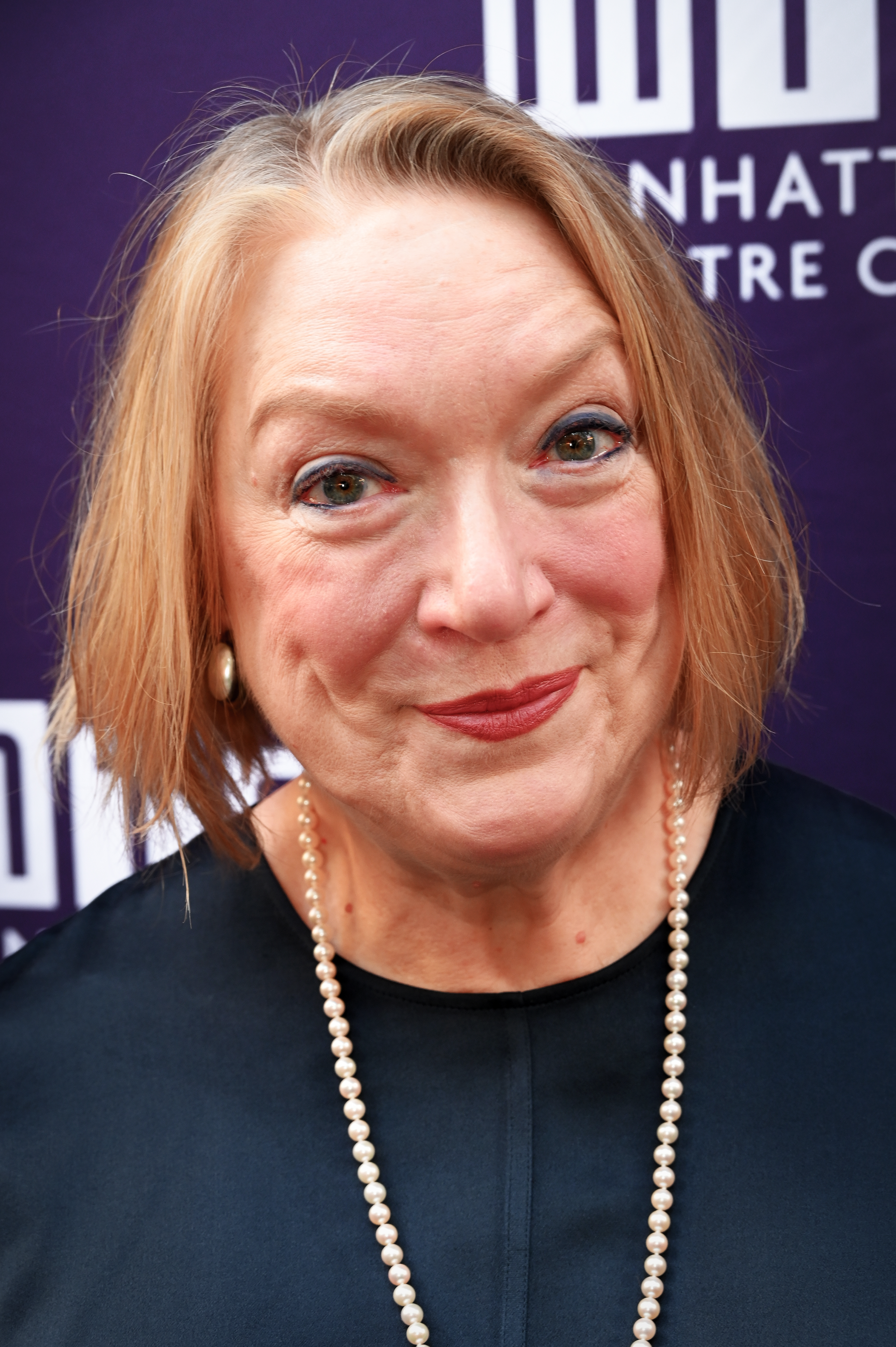
- Nielsen in 2026
- Born: May 28, 1955 (age 71); Bethesda, Maryland, U.S
- Education: Northwestern University (BA); Yale University (MFA)
- Occupation: Actress
- Years active: 1983–present

Kristine E. Nielsen (born May 28, 1955) is an American actress known for her work on Broadway and Off-Broadway. Nielsen was nominated for the 2013 Tony Award for Best Actress in a Play for her performance as Sonia in Vanya and Sonia and Masha and Spike and the 2019 Tony Award for Best Featured Actress in a Play for her performance in Gary: A Sequel to Titus Andronicus.

== Personal life ==
Nielsen grew up in the Washington, D.C., and Bethesda, Maryland, areas, the daughter of Homer Nielsen (1912–2005), who was born in the Philippines, and Eloise (née Gerard) Nielsen (1918–2009). Her mother, a Democrat, worked in government, at one point for president Jimmy Carter, and her father was a U.S. Navy captain. The family spent summers on Cape Cod. Her sister was Karen (Nielsen) Grammaticas (1951–2007), wife of Dr. Andrew Grammaticas. Her paternal grandfather was Harold Nielsen (1879–1958), who fought in World War I and had Danish ancestry. Her great-grandfather, Lewis Gerard (1833–1914), was an immigrant from France who fought for the Union in the Civil War.

She trained at Northwestern University (B.A) and the Yale School of Drama (M.F.A). At Yale her classmates included Frances McDormand and Tony Shalhoub. She is married to actor Brent Langdon.

== Career ==
=== Broadway ===
Nielsen has appeared in several Broadway shows. Her first appearance was in the 1985 production of The Iceman Cometh as Pearl. She next appeared in Jackie: An American Life (1997) playing various characters, including Rose Kennedy and Marilyn Monroe. In 2000 she played the role of Ninetta in a new production of The Green Bird. In 2005, she played Eunice Hubbell opposite Natasha Richardson's Blanche Dubois and Amy Ryan's Stella in A Streetcar Named Desire. In 2008 she played Madame de Volanges opposite Laura Linney as Marquise de Merteuil in Dangerous Liaisons and also played Anna in To Be or Not to Be. In 2010 she played The Storyteller in Bloody Bloody Andrew Jackson.

She later appeared on Broadway in Christopher Durang's play Vanya and Sonia and Masha and Spike as Sonia. For this role, Nielsen was nominated for the 2013 Tony Award for Best Lead Actress in a Play.

In 2014, she returned to Broadway, playing the role of Penny Sycamore in You Can't Take It with You. She played the role until the show closed on February 22, 2015, after 169 performances. In 2017, she played the role of Monica Reed in the limited run of Present Laughter, along with Kevin Kline and Cobie Smulders.

=== Off-Broadway ===
Nielsen has appeared in numerous Off-Broadway shows. She won an Obie Award for Best Actress for her role as Madeline Newell in Dog Opera (1995). Nielsen won the Obie and a Drama Desk Award nomination for Best Featured Actress for her role as Mrs. Siezmagraff in Betty's Summer Vacation (1999) by Christopher Durang. Her first Off-Broadway appearance was in a 1984 New York Shakespeare Festival production of Henry V at the Delacorte Theater in which she played Mistress Quickly. In 1988 she appeared opposite Laura Dern in The Palace of Amateurs.

In 2005, Nielsen starred as Veronica in Christopher Durang's play Miss Witherspoon at Playwrights Horizons. In 2007 she played the lead role of Mary in Crazy Mary by A. R. Gurney at Playwrights Horizons, also starring Sigourney Weaver. Nielsen portrayed Bootsie Carp in the 2007–08 production of Charles Busch's Die, Mommie, Die! at New World Stages. She has also appeared at the Guthrie Theater and in many regional theatre productions.

=== Film ===
Nielsen's first film appearance was in the 1999 film Advice from a Caterpillar. She next played the role of Emily Bailey in the Woody Allen film Small Time Crooks (2000). She has since appeared in the 2007 film The Savages starring Laura Linney, 2010's Morning Glory starring Rachel McAdams, and That's What She Said (2012).

=== Television ===
Nielsen's first television appearance was on a 1990 episode of Tales from the Crypt. She has also appeared on Third Watch, Conviction, two episodes of Law and Order, and three episodes of Political Animals as Alice, starring Sigourney Weaver.

In 2022, Nielsen starred in The Gilded Age on HBO.

== Stage ==
Year	Title	Role	Venue	Ref.
1985	The Iceman Cometh	Pearl	Broadway, Lunt-Fontanne Theatre	
1997	Jackie	Martha Bartlett, Rose Kennedy, Marilyn Monroe, Sander Vanocer	Broadway, Belasco Theatre	
1999	Betty's Summer Vacation	Mrs. Siezmagraff	Off-Broadway, Playwrights Horizons	
2000	The Green Bird	Ninetta	Broadway, Cort Theatre	
2005	A Streetcar Named Desire	Eunice Hubbel	Broadway, Studio 54	
2008	Spring Awakening	Adult Woman	Broadway, Eugene O'Neill Theatre	
2008	Les Liaisons Dangereuses	Madame de Volanges	Broadway, American Airlines Theatre	
2008	To Be or Not To Be	Anna	Broadway, Samuel J. Friedman Theatre	
2009	Why Torture Is Wrong, and the People Who love Them	Luella	Off-Broadway, The Public Theater	
2010	Bloody Bloody Andrew Jackson	The Storyteller	Broadway, Bernard B. Jacobs Theatre	
2013	Vanya and Sonia and Masha and Spike	Sonia	Broadway, John Golden Theatre	
2014	You Can't Take It With You	Penelope Sycamore	Broadway, Longacre Theatre	
2017	Present Laughter	Monica Reed	Broadway, St. James Theatre	
2019	Gary: A Sequel to Titus Andronicus	Janice	Broadway, Booth Theatre	
2025	Smash	Susan Proctor	Broadway, Imperial Theatre	
2025	Archduke (play)	Sladjana	Off-Broadway, Laura Pels Theater	

== Awards and nominations ==
Award	Year	Category	Work	Result	Ref.
Tony Awards	2013	Best Actress in a Play	Vanya and Sonia and Masha and Spike	Nominated	
Tony Awards	2019	Best Featured Actress in a Play	Gary: A Sequel to Titus Andronicus	Nominated	
Drama Desk Awards	1999	Outstanding Featured Actress in a Play	Betty's Summer Vacation	Nominated	
Outer Critics Circle Awards	1999	Outstanding Featured Actress in a Play	Betty's Summer Vacation	Nominated	
Outer Critics Circle Awards	2009	Outstanding Featured Actress in a Play	Why Torture is Wrong, and the People Who Love Them	Nominated	
Outer Critics Circle Awards	2013	Outstanding Featured Actress in a Play	Vanya and Sonia and Masha and Spike	Nominated	
