= Creature Crunch =

1996 video game

- Cover art featuring Martin Short and Eugene Levy
- Developer: Class6 Interactive
- Publisher: Class6 Entertainment
- Director: Ted Mathot
- Producer: John Mathot
- Designers: John Mathot, Drew Jacobsen, John Bevilacqua
- Artists: Kris Stiff, Hamilton Camp Jr., Barbara Newby
- Composer: Bill Ungerman
- Platforms: Windows 95, Windows NT 4.0
- Release: 1996
- Genre: Point-and-click Adventure
- Mode: Single-player

Creature Crunch is a 1996 animated point-and-click adventure game released primarily for Windows 95 and Windows NT 4.0 systems. It was developed by Class6 Interactive, a game-focused division of Class6 Entertainment. It received funding from the international group of investors called TechToons.

In the game, the player controls Wesley, a boy who is transformed into a human-monster hybrid by a mad scientist. Wesley has to escape the scientist's mansion, exploring its rooms and eating items which will help him defeat each room's guardians.

Creature Crunch features the voices of comedians Martin Short and Eugene Levy.

== Gameplay ==
Wesley and Brian in the mansion's kitchen

The game is essentially about clicking on objects. A vast number of them will answer to a click with a gag, including visual-based and dialogue-based gags. Some will trigger a different response when clicked a second or third time.

In order to escape, the player must navigate several unique rooms while solving puzzles, which involve defeating multiple guardians. For that purpose, Wesley picks up special objects spread around the mansion and keeps them inside his underwear. When in the presence of a guardian, selecting the correct object will allow the protagonist to eat it. By doing that, Wesley will transform into a deadly weapon and the respective guardian will be destroyed. In the first instance, he is instructed by Brian to eat a Bunsen burner, and transforms into a blowtorch that burns down the guardian. After doing so, the boy turns back to his regular monster form.

If Wesley and Brian stay in the same room for too long, they will be kicked out by a creature called Mr. Punishment. The player will also be forced out of a room if they try to explore it while a guardian is still present.

== Plot ==
Wesley (voiced by Martin Short) is riding a bike during a rainstorm and stops by an old Gothic mansion after getting a flat tire, to ask to use a phone. When he rings the doorbell, a pair of monstrous arms grab him and throw him under the welcome mat, where a trapdoor is located. A slide leads him to a secret lab, where he meets Dr. Drod. Drod is a mad, evil scientist who inhabits the mansion and plans to turn Wesley into a monster, the final one of his army, with the intent to wreak havoc on the world. The experiment goes wrong when Drod makes a mistake, killing him in the process. Wesley becomes a half-monster, strong enough to break free from the trap.

He meets Brian (played by Eugene Levy), a former King Great Pizza delivery man who is now just a floating brain in a jar. Together, they try to escape the mansion and reverse Wesley's transformation.

The front door of the mansion is guarded by an enormous cat, which has nine lives in total.

== Development ==
Class6 Entertainment animated eight CD-ROM titles for other companies before deciding to develop their own content.

Creature Crunch was the first creation from the agreement between Class6 Interactive (a game-focused division of Class6 Entertainment) and Allied Superproductions (from the brothers Ted and John Mathot). It was the first of a planned series of six CD-ROM games, with approximately US$3 million in planned co-funding from Hong Kong-based investment company TechToons.

Martin Short voiced Wesley and Dr. Drod, while Eugene Levy voiced Brian, the Kitchen Toast and several other characters. In total, they performed for almost 40 characters. The work was done in a single session. According to Short, they had a script to follow, but were also allowed to improvise significantly.

The entire game contains over 20,000 distinct drawings. The design and animation were done by John and Ted Mathot, who had previously worked on The Ren & Stimpy Show. According to John, the animation was designed first and the game was built around it; he described it as "almost like a Warner Bros. cartoon you can step into".

Class6’s animation workflow included a proprietary system called PixCel. It was developed by Class6 Interactive director of engineering Charles Scalfani and president/CEO Stephen Poehlein, and was described by the company as "the first fully integrated animation production and authoring system". It was meant to speed up the work by connecting the scanning of hand-drawn artwork, digital inking and painting, and authoring the interactive content.

The script was made by Ken Segal. The soundtrack was composed by Bill Ungerman.

According to the official website, the entire game was made in around nine months.

=== Other planned games from Class6 Interactive ===
Originally, in April 1996, Billboard announced that Class6 Interactive had another five games planned for release in the following year, but none of them were completed. The team was working on four distinct games when the company was permanently closed.

One of the announced games, called Cosmo's Rocket, was reported by April 1996 to be planned for release in July. By October 1996, it was scheduled for release in November, for Windows 95. It would feature actress Susan Sarandon's narration over a story about a boy named Cosmo and his dog. Alongside his friends, he would try to build a rocket for a science fair while dealing with the local bully, Eugene.

== Release ==
In April 1996, Billboard announced that Creature Crunch was scheduled for release in late May. The game debuted at E3 1996, in Los Angeles, that same month. On July 7, it was reported that the game would be released "next month".

The game received translations in Dutch (where it was called "Monster Mix") and Brazilian Portuguese (where it was called "Criatura Crunch - O Monstro").

The title was optioned by Universal Cartoon Studios, which intended to turn it into a series. However, after years in development, the project was cancelled.

According to the official website, the game is no longer sold, and became public domain. It can be freely downloaded.

== Critical reception ==
Reception

Review scores
Publication	Score
Entertainment Weekly	C
Just Adventure	B+

Bob Strauss, on Entertainment Weekly, described Creature Crunch as "passably enjoyable", and considered some of its humor to be too childish (highlighting fart jokes in a certain room). He mentioned the game's artwork reminded him of John Kricfalusi's artstyle. Meanwhile, Just Adventure's fixr was impressed by the sheer amount of interactable objects and gags, which he called "the best part of this game". He highlighted the involvement needed from the player in order to properly enjoy the game's humor, and praised it as the "best element of Creature Crunch".

Gordon Aplin, writing for metzomagic.com, defined the game's humor as "good stuff for the very young", with some funny moments for the older players. He also complimented the cartoon animation and the voice acting. On the other hand, he criticized the gameplay's reliance on clicking objects multiple times, claiming that "a lot of repetition is necessary to progress", as well as the lack of subtitles. According to him, the game was too short, lacked challenge and felt more well-suited for very young players.

Heitor de Paola, from Overloadr, drew attention to the game's Brazilian Portuguese dubbing as uncommon for its time, with well-known voice actors present. However, he described the localization as lacking, and lamented the mistranslations and lost jokes.

== Awards ==
The game's director, Ted Mathot, won an award at the 1997 World Animation Celebration, in the category "Best Director of Animation for a CD-ROM".
