= Gary: A Sequel to Titus Andronicus =

2019 play written by Taylor Mac

- Written by: Taylor Mac
- Original language: English

Premiere
- Date premiered: April 21, 2019
- Place premiered: Booth Theatre

Gary: A Sequel to Titus Andronicus is a play written by Taylor Mac. The play is set in the aftermath of William Shakespeare's Titus Andronicus. The play premiered on Broadway in April 2019 starring Nathan Lane and received seven Tony Award nominations.

== Production ==
The play premiered on Broadway at the Booth Theatre in previews on March 11, 2019 and officially on April 21. The cast consisted of Nathan Lane (Gary), Kristine Nielsen (Janice), and Julie White (Carol). The production was directed by George C. Wolfe and produced by Scott Rudin, with scenic design by Santo Loquasto, costume design by Ann Roth, and lighting design by Jules Fisher and Peggy Eisenhauer.

Andrea Martin was originally set to appear in the production, but withdrew due to injury. Her role was assumed by Nielsen, while White was cast in Nielsen's former role.

The play received seven Tony Award nominations, including for Best Play and Best Featured Actress in a Play (White and Nielsen).

The play closed on June 16, 2019 after 45 previews and 65 regular performances.

== Overview ==
The play is set in 400 BC. Two servants, Gary and Janice, are cleaning up the bodies after the devastation of the civil war is over.

== Cast and characters ==
| Character | Broadway |
| Character | 2019 |
|---|---|
| Gary | Nathan Lane |
| Janice | Kristine Nielsen |
| Carol | Julie White |

== Awards and nominations ==
| Year | Award | Category | Work | Result | Ref. |
|---|---|---|---|---|---|
| 2019 | Tony Award | Best Play | | Nominated | |
| 2019 | Tony Award | Best Performance by a Featured Actress in a Play | Kristine Nielsen | Nominated | |
| 2019 | Tony Award | Best Performance by a Featured Actress in a Play | Julie White | Nominated | |
| 2019 | Tony Award | Best Direction of a Play | George C. Wolfe | Nominated | |
| 2019 | Tony Award | Best Scenic Design of a Play | Santo Loquasto | Nominated | |
| 2019 | Tony Award | Best Costume Design of a Play | Ann Roth | Nominated | |
| 2019 | Tony Award | Best Lighting Design of a Play | Jules Fisher and Peggy Eisenhauer | Nominated | |
| 2019 | Drama Desk Award | Outstanding Wig and Hair Design | Campbell Young Associates | Nominated | |
| 2019 | Drama League Award | Outstanding Production of a Play | | Nominated | |
