= Margaret Hamilton =

Margaret Hamilton may refer to:

- Margaret Hamilton (nurse) (1840–1922), American nurse in the Civil War
- Maggie Hamilton (1867–1952), Scottish artist
- Margaret Hamilton (educator) (1871–1969), American educator
- Margaret Hamilton (actress) (1902–1985), American film character actress
- Margaret Hamilton (software engineer) (1936–2026), American software engineer
- Margaret Hamilton (publisher) (1941–2022), Australian publisher of children's literature
