= Foxy Lady (film) =

1971 Canadian comedy film

- Film poster
- Directed by: Ivan Reitman
- Written by: Robert Sandler; Matt Siegel
- Produced by: Ivan Reitman
- Starring: Alan Gordon; Sylvia Feigel
- Cinematography: Ken Lambert
- Edited by: Ivan Reitman
- Music by: Doug Riley; Ivan Reitman
- Distributed by: Cineplex of Canada
- Release date: September 27, 1971
- Running time: 85 minutes
- Country: Canada
- Language: English

Foxy Lady is a 1971 Canadian comedy film directed by Ivan Reitman. It was Reitman's debut feature film and was also the first film appearance of both Eugene Levy and Andrea Martin.

== Cast ==
- Alan Gordon as Hero
- Sylvia Feigel as Leander
- Robert McHeady as Mr. Stephens
- Patrick Boxill as Mr. Seman
- Nicole Morin as Director
- Gino Marrocco as Biker
- Arch McDonnell as Dr. Saltzman
- Mira Pawluk as Alice
- Andrea Martin as Girl Next Door
- Eugene Levy
- Claire-Anne Bundy
