= Rated R: Republicans in Hollywood =

- DVD cover
- Directed by: Jesse Moss
- Written by: Jesse Moss
- Produced by: Jesse Moss
- Narrated by: Jesse Moss
- Cinematography: Joan Churchill
- Edited by: Melissa Neidich
- Music by: Andy Farber; Jack Livesey
- Production company: Mile End Films
- Distributed by: AMC
- Release date: September 14, 2004
- Running time: 45 minutes
- Country: United States
- Language: English

Rated R: Republicans in Hollywood is a 2004 American television documentary film about politically conservative members of Hollywood, exploring whether they face discrimination within the industry.

== Appearances ==
The documentary includes interviews with filmmakers and actors including

- Drew Carey
- Lionel Chetwynd
- Vincent Gallo
- Patricia Heaton
- Michael Medved
- John Milius
- Ivan Reitman
- Pat Sajak
- Douglas Urbanski

== Production and release ==
Created and narrated by former Democratic speech writer Jesse Moss, the documentary explores the conservative side of Hollywood, interviewing actors, producers, and filmmakers.

The documentary premiered on AMC on September 14, 2004.

== Reception ==
The film received a modest reception from critics.
