= Cannibal Girls =

1973 film by Ivan Reitman

- Theatrical release poster
- Directed by: Ivan Reitman
- Screenplay by: Daniel Goldberg
- Story by: Robert Sandler; Daniel Goldberg; Ivan Reitman
- Produced by: Daniel Goldberg
- Starring: Eugene Levy; Andrea Martin; Ronald Ulrich
- Cinematography: Robert Saad
- Edited by: Daniel Goldberg
- Music by: Doug Riley
- Distributed by: Cinépix Film Properties Inc. (Canada); American International Pictures (US)
- Release date: June 8, 1973
- Running time: 84 minutes
- Country: Canada
- Language: English
- Budget: CAD $15,000

Cannibal Girls is a 1973 Canadian independent exploitation comedy horror film, co-written and directed by Ivan Reitman and starring Eugene Levy, Andrea Martin, and Ronald Ulrich.

== Plot ==
A couple are relaxing in a snowy forest near a small town in Ontario called Farnhamville. Suddenly, an axe wielding female assailant kills the boyfriend, rips the girlfriend's shirt open, and puts a dab of blood between her female victim's breasts.

Clifford Sturges and Gloria Wellaby are having trouble with their car. Their car manages to last until they reach the small and secluded town called Farnhamville, where it breaks down. At the same time, they come across another traveler who is looking for his missing sister (the female victim in the beginning sequence). Stranded, Clifford and Gloria check into a small motel owned by an old lady named Mrs. Wainwright. While inside, the old lady tells the couple about an urban legend, the 'Cannibal Girls'. It is about three beautiful but psychotic women named Anthea, Clarissa, and Leona, who lured men with their seductive charm to their home only to feast on them while alive. By eating their victims and drinking their blood, the girls maintained their youthfulness and immortality. They have a freakish little servant called 'Bunker'.

Clarissa kills the first victim in a secluded room, with both of them naked. She stabs him in the gut with a pair of scissors. For the second victim, Leona slowly stalks him with a knife, providing a diversion for Anthea to hack the man with an axe. The third victim wakes up the next day, wondering where all the other guys have gone. Later on, he makes love to Anthea. When he wakes up, he finds himself tied to a bed, surrounded by all three girls. At first they lick his belly, then they eat him alive right on the spot. Meanwhile, the traveler who was looking for his sister gets murdered by the local police as a special request from the Reverend himself.

Mrs. Wainwright takes Clifford and Gloria to a small bed and breakfast where the Cannibal Girls supposedly lived years before. They meet the host only known as the Reverend Alex St. John. The couple does not realize it, but their dinner is being served by the three Cannibal Girls themselves. The Reverend is the force behind the women's activities and possesses a charismatic hold on the entire town as well. The town residents hold a gathering dedicated to the Reverend Alex St. John. Anthea, Clarissa, and Leona are fully naked, standing around a small table offering their blood in a chalice to the Reverend, while chanting: "Within me and without me I honor the blood which gives me life."

Clifford and Gloria try to leave, but a thunderstorm and a warning of an escaped lunatic from the Reverend prompts the couple to stay overnight. Gloria has a scary nightmare of Clifford tied to the bed. The Reverend and the three girls force her to sacrifice Clifford. She wakes up from the nightmare, and Clifford tells her it was all a dream.

Clifford becomes distant to Gloria and speaks to her in a demanding way. Gloria cannot place a call to her parents since the phone lines are not working, and cannot leave town because the buses will not leave until the next morning. Clifford develops a craving for the food that is served in the town's small diners (which is actually human meat).

They are picked up by the sheriff and are taken back to the bed and breakfast occupied by the Cannibal Girls. When they walk inside, it is revealed that Clifford will offer Gloria as a sacrifice to the Reverend in exchange for his life. However, the Reverend has a change of heart, as he offers Gloria a mace. Fueled by the anger of her boyfriend's betrayal, Gloria mercilessly swings the mace into Clifford's stomach, killing him instantly.

During the final scene, the Reverend, Anthea, Clarissa, Leona, Bunker, and Gloria are seated at the table, with Clifford as the meal. At first Gloria is hesitant to eat her former boyfriend, but after a sign of encouragement from the Reverend, she happily digs in.

In the epilogue, it turns out that this entire event is actually being told by Mrs. Wainwright, this time about four Cannibal Girls to another couple stranded in their town.

== Cast ==
- Eugene Levy — Clifford Sturges, a traveling guitar player
- Andrea Martin — Gloria Wellaby, Clifford's girlfriend
- Ronald Ulrich — Reverend Alex St. John
- Randall Carpenter — Anthea, the oldest Cannibal Girl
- Bonnie Neilson — Clarissa, the second oldest Cannibal Girl
- Mira Pawluk — Leona, the youngest Cannibal Girl
- Bob McHeady — Sheriff
- Alan Gordon — Rick, First Victim
- Allan Price — Felix, Second Victim
- Earl Pomerantz — Third Victim
- May Jarvis — Mrs. Wainwright
- Gino Marrocco — Mouse
- Rick Maguire — Gas Station Attendant
- Bunker — Henchman
- Fishka Rais — Butcher (as Kingfish)
- Marion Swadron — Mrs. Wilson

== Production ==
Cannibal Girls was filmed between 1971 and 1972, in rural areas surrounding Toronto, Ontario, Canada. The town scenes were all shot in Beaverton, Ontario. The home was owned by May Jarvis in Aurora, Ontario. Other scenes were shot in Oak Ridges, Ontario. The film was made with a very low budget and much of the dialogue was improvised. The movie trailers and posters gave warnings to audiences who are squeamish to close their eyes whenever the bell rings during certain scenes of the film.

== Awards ==
In November 1973, Ivan Reitman took the film to Spain for the Sitges Film Festival, where Eugene Levy and Andrea Martin won the awards for Best Actor and Best Actress, respectively.

== Release ==
The film premiered on June 8, 1973, and was re-released as part of the South by Southwest Film Conference, on March 13, 2010.

The film was released on DVD through Shout! Factory on October 26, 2010

== In popular culture ==
During a montage of New York City being overrun by ghosts in Ghostbusters II (also directed by Reitman), Cannibal Girls is the film showing at a cinema where movie-goers are chased out by a winged ghost. It appears again in Ghostbusters: Afterlife once again at a local cinema. In 2024's Ghostbusters: Frozen Empire it appears as a VHS cassette that Gary Grooberson picks up to watch for movie night.

== Bibliography ==
- Vatnsdal, Caelum (2004). They Came From Within : A History of Canadian Horror Cinema. Arbeiter Ring Publishing. ISBN 1-894037-21-9.
