= Ivan Reitman =

Canadian filmmaker (1946–2022)

Ivan Reitman OC
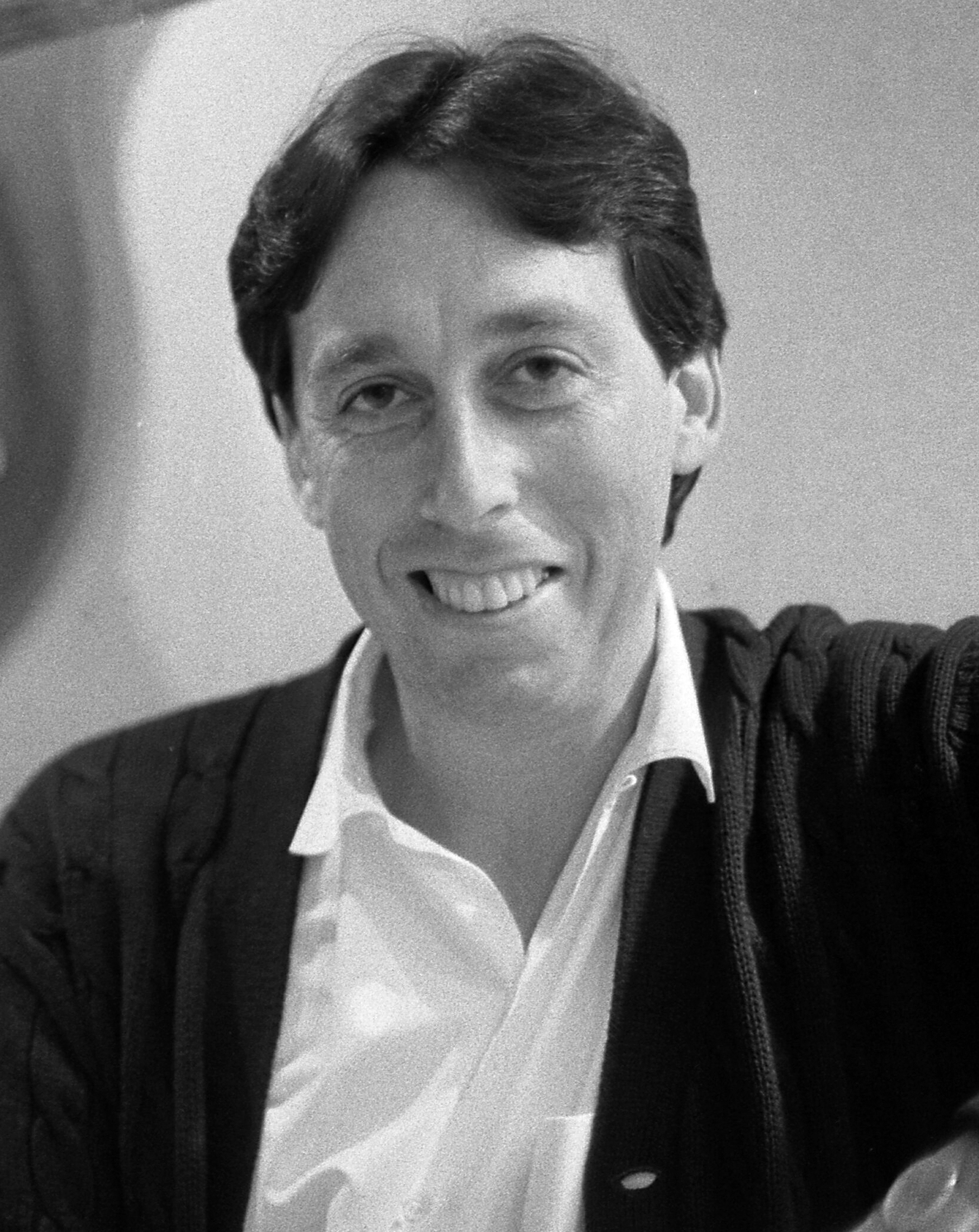
- Reitman in 1984
- Born: October 27, 1946; Komárno, Czechoslovakia
- Died: February 12, 2022 (aged 75); Montecito, California, U.S.
- Resting place: Santa Barbara Cemetery
- Education: McMaster University
- Occupations: Film director; producer; screenwriter
- Years active: 1968–2022
- Spouse: Geneviève Robert (m. 1976)
- Children: 3, including Jason and Catherine

Ivan Reitman OC (/ˈraɪtmən/; October 27, 1946 – February 12, 2022) was a Canadian filmmaker. He was known for his comedy films, especially in the 1980s and 1990s. Reitman was the owner of The Montecito Picture Company, founded in 1998.

Films he directed include Meatballs (1979), Stripes (1981), Ghostbusters (1984), Twins (1988), Ghostbusters II (1989), Kindergarten Cop (1990), Dave (1993), Junior (1994) and Draft Day (2014). Reitman also served as producer for such films as National Lampoon's Animal House (1978), Heavy Metal (1981), Space Jam (1996) and Private Parts (1997).

== Early life ==
Ivan Reitman was born in the town of Komárno, Czechoslovakia (now Slovakia), on October 27, 1946, the son of Klara (Raab) and Ladislav "Leslie" Reitman. Both of Reitman's parents were Hungarian Jews; his mother survived the Auschwitz concentration camp, and his father was an underground resistance fighter. His family arrived in Canada as refugees when Reitman was four years old. Reitman attended Oakwood Collegiate in Toronto and was a member of the Twintone Four singing group. He attended McMaster University, receiving a Bachelor of Music in 1969. At McMaster he produced and directed many short films.

== Career ==
Reitman's first producing job was with the then-new station CITY-TV in Toronto. CITY was also the home of the first announcing job of his later friend and collaborator Dan Aykroyd. However, Reitman's tenure at CITY was short; he was fired during his first year by station owner Moses Znaimer.

In Toronto, he produced the stage production Spellbound (1973) starring his university friend, magician Doug Henning, with a script by David Cronenberg and score by Howard Shore. This show evolved into the 1974 Broadway production The Magic Show, which ran for four and a half years at the Cort Theatre. Reitman and Henning also collaborated on the 1983 musical Merlin, for which Reitman was nominated for the Tony Awards for Best Musical (as a producer) and Best Direction of a Musical.

Reitman's first commercial film ventures were as producer of two films for director David Cronenberg, Shivers (1975) and Rabid (1977). In 1976, he left the Canadian studio Cinépix for good to start producing American films through his newly-formed Ivan Reitman Productions. His big break came when he produced National Lampoon's Animal House in 1978 and directed Meatballs in 1979, mainly to fulfill contractual obligations with the former Canadian studio Cinépix that he left in 1976. From there, he directed and produced a number of comedies including Stripes (1981), Ghostbusters (1984), Legal Eagles (1986), Twins (1988), Ghostbusters II (1989), Kindergarten Cop (1990), Dave (1993), Junior (1994), Six Days, Seven Nights (1998), Evolution (2001), My Super Ex-Girlfriend (2006), and No Strings Attached (2011).

In the early 1990s, Reitman began to direct fewer films, but increased his role as a producer and executive producer through his company, Northern Lights Entertainment. He helped to produce the animated film Heavy Metal (1981), as well as the live-action films Spacehunter: Adventures in the Forbidden Zone (1983), Beethoven (1992), Beethoven's 2nd (1993), Space Jam (1996), Howard Stern's film Private Parts (1997)

In 1998, Reitman (alongside former Universal Pictures chairman Tom Pollock) founded The Montecito Picture Company as a reinvention of his former film company Northern Lights Entertainment, using the same team, a film production company located just south of Santa Barbara. In 2007, Reitman was inducted into Canada's Walk of Fame.

He next produced the comedy I Love You, Man (2009), starring Paul Rudd and Jason Segel. Also in 2009, he produced the Academy Award-nominated film, Up in the Air, directed by his son Jason Reitman. Later, Reitman had planned to direct the erotic thriller Chloe (2009) but he couldn't attract the cast he wanted so Reitman decided to only serve as a producer and asked Atom Egoyan to direct the film. Chloe has since enjoyed commercial success and became Egoyan's biggest moneymaker ever.

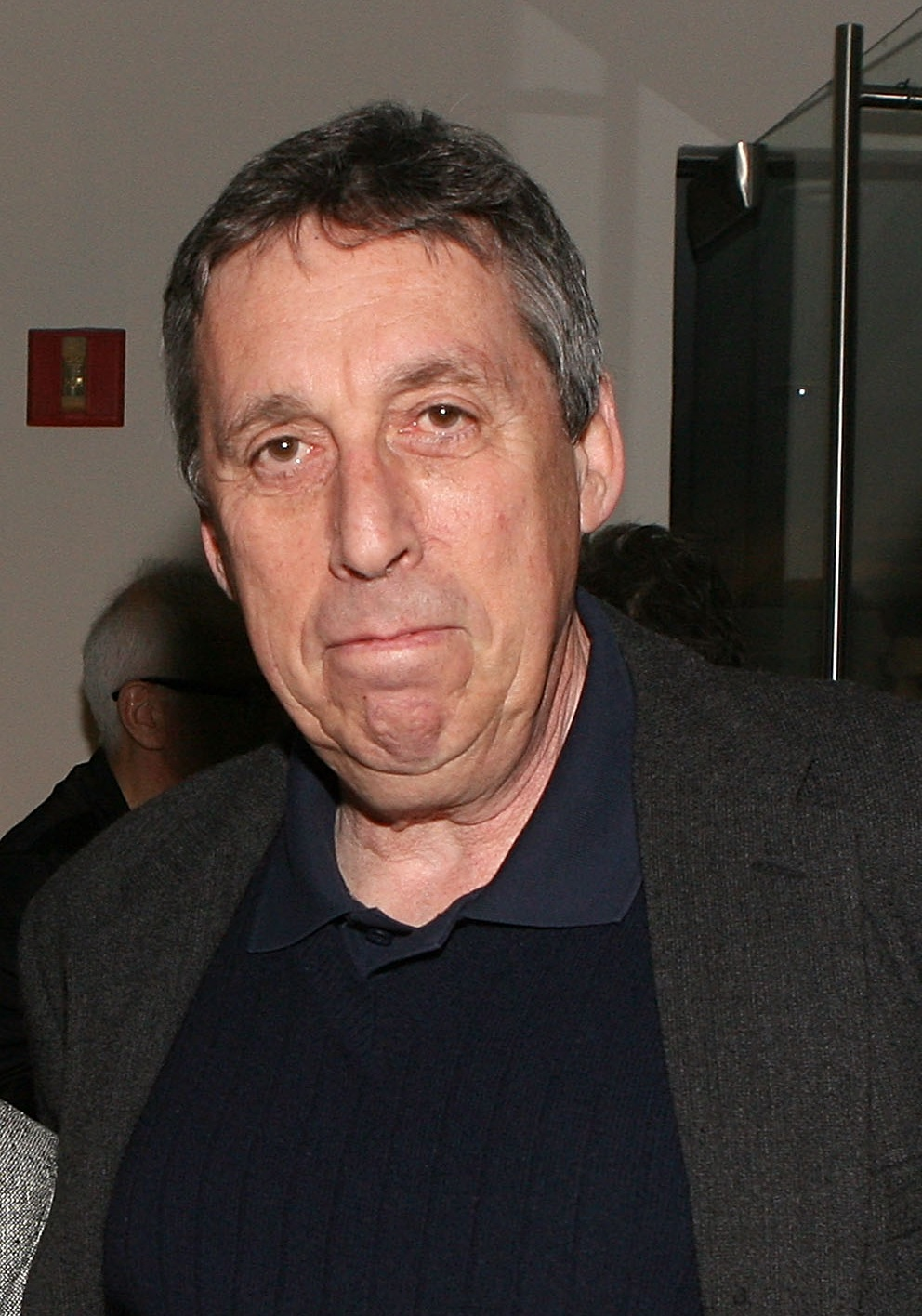
Reitman in 2011

In his final decade, Reitman also co-produced the biographical film Hitchcock, released on November 23, 2012, directed the 2014 sports drama Draft Day, starring Kevin Costner, and served as executive producer on 2021's Space Jam: A New Legacy as he had done for the first film.

In mid-January 2019, news of a new Ghostbusters film, Ghostbusters: Afterlife, came through with Ivan's son Jason Reitman taking over as co-writer and director. Ivan remained producer, and stood in for the late Harold Ramis as Egon Spengler using visual effects. The film was released on November 19, 2021, marking his final film before his death. However, Reitman received a posthumous producer credit for the sequel to Ghostbusters: Afterlife, Ghostbusters: Frozen Empire, which was released on March 22, 2024. The film is also dedicated to his memory.

=== Unmade projects ===
In the early 1980s, Tom Mankiewicz wrote a script for a film titled The Batman, with Reitman attached to direct. He planned to cast Meatballs star Bill Murray as Batman, David Niven as Alfred Pennyworth, William Holden as Commissioner James Gordon, and singer David Bowie as Joker. Following the deaths of Holden and Niven and rewrites of the script, Reitman left the project and was replaced by Gremlins director Joe Dante, but the film was never made.

In the mid-1980s, Reitman was in contention to direct Memoirs of an Invisible Man, but departed from the project due to creative differences with star Chevy Chase.

In 1992, Reitman was said to be in the midst of planning a reteaming with Twins star Danny DeVito on the project Prague, from a script written by Lem Dobbs.

In February 1996, it was reported that Reitman was planning a remake of Creature from the Black Lagoon at Universal with a script by Herschel Weingrod and Timothy Harris, as well as a potential Marx brothers feature, but neither materialized.

In April 1996, it was reported that Reitman was attached to produce, and possibly direct, a Wonder Woman film. However, three years later, he passed the project on to writer Jon Cohen and left for unknown reasons.

In 1999, it was reported that Reitman would direct David Stern's script Wish, described as a big-budget "comedy with songs" that combines live-action, animation and special effects. Stephen Schwartz was to write new music for the film, which was to be a co-production between The Montecito Picture Company and DreamWorks Pictures. By the following year, Reitman had chosen to direct Evolution instead of Wish for DreamWorks.

In 2000, Reitman, along with Wolfgang Petersen, Rob Reiner, M. Night Shyamalan, Alan Parker, Tim Robbins, Terry Gilliam, Brad Silberling and Peter Weir, were considered to direct Harry Potter and the Philosopher's Stone, but the directing job was given to Chris Columbus instead.

In 2001, Reitman revealed he would direct MGM's remake of The Pink Panther, with Mike Myers in the role of Inspector Clouseau. A 2006 iteration starred Steve Martin in the role instead.

In March 2007, New York magazine, citing no sources, stated that Sony Pictures Entertainment wanted to replace Reitman on Ghostbusters III with a younger director, but that Reitman's original contract precluded this. In early 2010, it appeared as if Reitman would direct the film, but in September 2014, after Harold Ramis' death, Paul Feig was officially set to direct a new film, which was released in 2016 as a reboot of the franchise.

In 2011, The Hollywood Reporter announced that Reitman's Montecito Picture Company had acquired the rights to Alan Paul's memoir Big in China for him to produce and possibly direct an adaptation of.

In March 2012, it was reported that a sequel to Twins, titled Triplets, was in the works, and that Reitman would co-produce the film. Deadline reported in September 2021 that Reitman would both direct and produce Triplets and that shooting was scheduled to begin in January 2022. The status of the film is unclear following Reitman's death, with Arnold Schwarzenegger suggesting that Reitman's son Jason "stopped the project when his father died" and that the younger Reitman "never liked the idea".

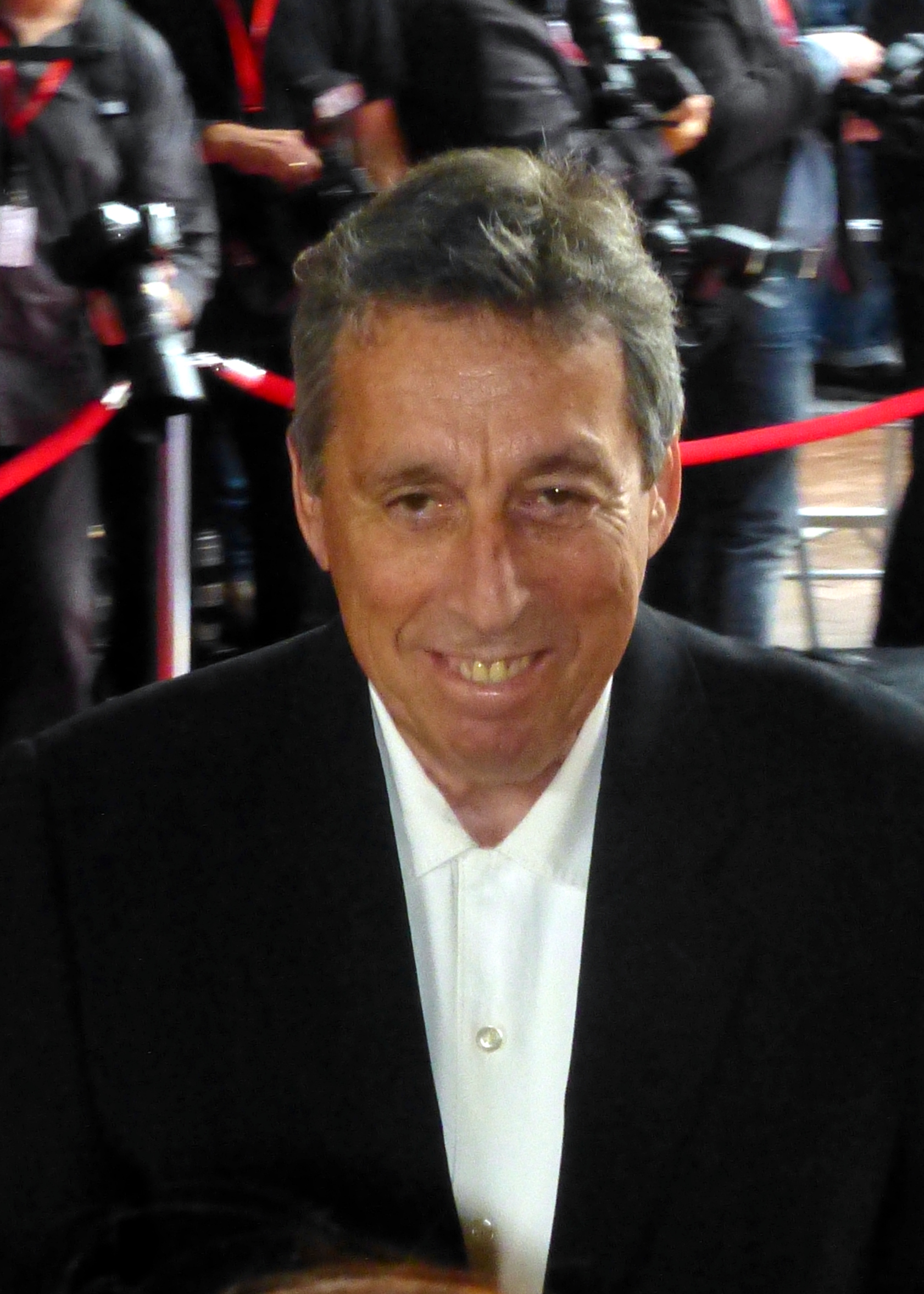
Reitman in 2013

In 2013, it was revealed that Reitman had plans to make a sequel to Evolution, but they never came to fruition.

In June 2016, it was reported that Reitman would produce a prospective animated series, Ghostbusters: Ecto Force. In July 2017, Reitman stated that Ecto Force had been postponed to focus on an animated Ghostbusters film that he would produce and co-direct alongside Fletcher Moules.

In 2017, Reitman was prepping Summer of Love, a road trip musical he was to direct and produce, with Shawn Mendes set to star, and Montecito Picture Company's Joe Medjuk, Tom Pollock and Ali Bell also producing.

== Personal life and death ==
Reitman married Geneviève Robert in 1976. He had two daughters and a son, Jason, who is a film director best known for his films Juno, Thank You for Smoking, Up in the Air and Ghostbusters: Afterlife. His daughter Catherine is the creator, executive producer, writer and star of the CBC comedy series Workin' Moms. His other daughter, Caroline, is a nurse in San Diego, California. He and his French-Canadian wife, who converted to Judaism, brought up their children in the same tradition.

In 2009, he was made an Officer of the Order of Canada "for his contributions as a director and producer, and for his promotion of the Canadian film and television industries". In April 2011, he received the Mayor's Prize at his native city of Komárno, Slovakia. He received the Queen Elizabeth II Diamond Jubilee Medal in 2012.

In 2014, he said "I've always been something of a conservative-slash-libertarian." Reitman had previously appeared in the 2004 documentary Rated R: Republicans in Hollywood.

Reitman died in his sleep at home in Montecito, California, on February 12, 2022, at the age of 75.

== Filmography ==
Directed features
Year	Title	Distribution
1971	Foxy Lady	Cineplex of Canada
1973	Cannibal Girls	Cinépix Film Properties Inc. / American International Pictures
1979	Meatballs	Paramount Pictures
1981	Stripes	Columbia Pictures
1984	Ghostbusters	Columbia Pictures
1986	Legal Eagles	Universal Pictures
1988	Twins	Universal Pictures
1989	Ghostbusters II	Columbia Pictures
1990	Kindergarten Cop	Universal Pictures
1993	Dave	Warner Bros.
1994	Junior	Universal Pictures
1997	Fathers' Day	Warner Bros.
1998	Six Days, Seven Nights	Buena Vista Pictures Distribution
2001	Evolution	DreamWorks Pictures / Columbia Pictures
2006	My Super Ex-Girlfriend	20th Century Fox
2011	No Strings Attached	Paramount Pictures
2014	Draft Day	Lionsgate Films
