= Leslie Libman =

American television director

- Occupation: Director
- Years active: 1976-present

Leslie Libman is an American television director. She also directed commercials and music videos.

== Television work ==
Since 1995 she works primarily as a TV director on a number of television series, most notably directing multiple episodes of Homicide: Life on the Street, The 4400, and NCIS. Other series include The Wire, Oz, and The Shield. For MTV she created and directed with her late husband, Larry Williams, Out of Order, a series of six original short films.

She co-directed with Larry Williams two television movies - in 1997 the HBO TV movie Path to Paradise: The Untold Story of the World Trade Center Bombing (starring Peter Gallagher and Art Malik) and the 1998 TV adaptation of Aldous Huxley's Brave New World (again starring Gallagher with Leonard Nimoy) for the USA Network.

In 2003 she directed the ABC TV movie The Extreme Team (a.k.a. The X-Team).

== Other work ==
Before moving to television work, Libman and Williams formed a directing team creating commercials (among others for American Express, Christian Dior, McDonald's, Panasonic, and Sony) and music clips (Boy George, The Church, Al Green, Ziggy Marley & The Melody Makers and more). Without Williams, she directed music videos for The Bangles, Bee Gees, Chicago, Michael McDonald, Roy Orbison, and Rod Stewart and others.

== Filmography ==
TV series

Year	Title	Season	Episode title	Episode	Notes
2021	The Resident	4	"Home Before Dark"	62	
2017	NCIS	15	"The Numerical Limit"	19	
2014	NCIS	12	"So It Goes"	3	
2014	NCIS	11	"Bulletproof"	15	
2012	NCIS	10	"Shell Shock (Part 1)"	6	
2012	NCIS	9	"Secrets"	15	
2012	NCIS	9	"A Desperate Man"	13	
2011	NCIS	9	"Devil's Triangle"	7	
2010	FlashForward	1	"The Negotiation"	20	
2010	FlashForward	1	"Course Correction"	19	
2010	NCIS	8	"Short Fuse"	3	
2009	NCIS: Los Angeles	1	"Keepin' It Real"	6	
2009	NCIS	7	"Good Cop, Bad Cop"	4	
2009	NCIS	6	"Caged"	12	
2009	In Plain Sight	2	"Aguna Matatala"	5	
2008	Knight Rider	1	"Knight of the Living Dead"	6	
2008	Numb3rs	4	"Atomic No. 33"	16	
2008	The L Word	5	"Lay Down the Law"	8	
2007	Numb3rs	3	"Take Out"	14	
2007	The 4400	4	"The Marked"	6	
2007	Medium	3	"The Whole Truth"	8	
2006	Sleeper Cell	2	"School"	6	
2006	Brotherhood	1	"Samyutta 11:10"	6	
2006	NCIS	3	"Untouchable"	20	
2006	NCIS	3	"Deception"	13	
2005	Sleeper Cell	1	"Family"	6	
2005	The 4400	2	"Carrier"	7	
2005	The 4400	2	"Wake-Up Call"	1	
2005	Entourage	2	"An Offer Refused"	4	
2004	The Wire	3	"Homecoming"	6	
2004	Keen Eddie	1	"Liberté, Egalité, Fraternité"	13	
2004	Jake 2.0	1	"Dead Man Walking"	15	
2003	The Practice	8	"The Chosen"	2	
2002	Fastlane	1	"Get Your Mack On"	9	
2002	John Doe	1	"Manifest Destiny"	9	
2002	Without a Trace	1	"Snatch Back"	7	
2002	Crossing Jordan	2	"Payback"	4	
2002	American Dreams		Unknown episode		
2002	MDs		Unknown episode		
2002	The Shield	1	"Throwaway"	9	
2001	Oz	4	"Blizzard of '01"	13	
2001	Gideon's Crossing	1	"Prodigal Dad"	15	
2001	Gideon's Crossing	1	"Hinkytown"	11	
2001	The Division	1	"Seduced and Abandoned"	3	
2000	The Beat		Unknown episode		
1998	Homicide: Life on the Street	7	"Just an Old Fashioned Love Song"	3	Co-directed with Larry Williams
1998	Homicide: Life on the Street	6	"Closet Cases"	9	Co-directed with Larry Williams
1997	Homicide: Life on the Street	5	"Partners and Other Strangers"	21	Co-directed with Larry Williams
1996	Homicide: Life on the Street	4	"Full Moon"	17	Co-directed with Larry Williams
1996	Out of Order	1	"Strange Habit"		Co-directed with Larry Williams
1996	Out of Order	1	"Stable for Transfer"		Co-directed with Larry Williams
1996	Out of Order	1	"Refracted"		Co-directed with Larry Williams
1996	Out of Order	1	"Familiar Bonds"		Co-directed with Larry Williams
1996	Out of Order	1	"Hey Joey"		Co-directed with Larry Williams
1996	Out of Order	1	"Squids"		Co-directed with Larry Williams

TV movies

- Britney Ever After (2017)
- The Extreme Team (2003)
- Brave New World (1998) (Co-directed with Larry Williams)
- Path to Paradise: The Untold Story of the World Trade Center Bombing (1997) (Co-directed with Larry Williams)
