= Kaley Ronayne =

American actress

- Born: February 12, 1990 (age 36); Detroit, Michigan
- Occupation: Actress
- Years active: 2010–present

Kaley Ronayne is an American actress. She is best known for playing Dr. Kincaid Sullivan in the medical drama series The Resident.

== Early life ==
Ronayne was born in Detroit, Michigan to Brendan Ronayne and Donna(nee McDonald). She attended Mercy High School where she acted in many plays. She spent one season at the Interlochen Center for the Arts. She attended Boston University, spending a semester in London, where she was given many opportunities to act nationwide.

== Career ==
Some of her early notable appearances were in Blue Bloods, Chicago P.D., Nashville, Army Wives, Quarry and as the Penguin's stepsister Sasha Van Zahl in Gotham. Her first big role came playing Dee O' Hara in the historical drama series The Right Stuff. Her biggest role so far has been playing Kincaid Sullivan in the medical drama series The Resident. She was made a series regular for season 6. She hopes to star in a comedy film in the future as she describes herself as a bit of a clown.

== Filmography ==
=== Film ===
Year	Title	Role	Notes
2010	Here Today	Danielle	Short
2013	Northern Borders	Cleopatra Kittredge	Short
2013	The Hyperglot	Amber	Short
2016	No Comment from the Peanut Gallery	Hal	Short
2017	Kensho at the Bedfellow	Kate	
2019	Young Widows	Fiona Porter	Short
2019	NYPD Blue	Britt McKenna	
2020	The Weekend Fix	Sheila Ranger	Short
2021	The Breakdown Parables	Kaley	
2022	The Falling World	Maeve	
2024	Pirandello on Broadway	Mary	Short

=== Television ===
Year	Title	Role	Notes
2013	The Carrie Diaries	Blythe	Episode; Dangerous Territory
2013	Army Wives	Jordan Young	3 episodes
2015	Deadbeat	Ms Fatale	Episode; Good Will Haunting
2015	Royal Pains	Mimi Harper	Episode; Secret Asian Man
2015	Public Morals	Agnes	4 episodes
2016	Model Woman	Rebecca Blackwell	Episode; Pilot
2016	Gotham	Sasha Van Zahl	3 episodes
2016	Quarry	Sandy Williams	4 episodes
2017	Nashville	Kelly Walker	Episode; Speed Trap Town
2017	NCIS: Naval Criminal Investigative Service	Rhonda C.	Episode; Trapped
2017	Chicago P.D.	Sam Scott	Episode; Monster
2018	Blue Bloods	Shelly Dowd	Episode; Blackout
2020	FBI: Most Wanted	Jeri Earls	Episode; Getaway
2020	The Right Stuff	Dee O' Hara	7 episodes
2021	The Equalizer	Amber Nelson	Episode; Followers
2021	The Resident	Dr. Kincaid Sullivan	23 episodes
