= List of The Resident episodes =

The Resident is an American medical drama television series created by Amy Holden Jones, Hayley Schore, and Roshan Sethi for the Fox Broadcasting Company. Based on the book Unaccountable by Marty Makary, the series focuses on the lives and duties of staff members at Chastain Park Memorial Hospital, while delving into the bureaucratic practices of the hospital industry.

On May 17, 2021, Fox renewed the series for a fifth season, which premiered on September 21, 2021. On May 16, 2022, Fox renewed the series for a sixth season, which premiered on September 20, 2022. On April 6, 2023, Fox canceled the series after six seasons. During the course of the series, 107 episodes of The Resident aired over six seasons, between January 21, 2018, and January 17, 2023.

== Series overview ==
Season	Episodes	Originally released	
Season	Episodes	First released	Last released
1	14	January 21, 2018	May 14, 2018
2	23	September 24, 2018	May 6, 2019
3	20	September 24, 2019	April 7, 2020
4	14	January 12, 2021	May 18, 2021
5	23	September 21, 2021	May 17, 2022
6	13	September 20, 2022	January 17, 2023

== Episodes ==
=== Season 1 (2018) ===
No. overall	No. in season	Title	Directed by	Written by	Original release date	Prod. code	U.S. viewers (millions)
1	1	"Pilot"	Phillip Noyce	Amy Holden Jones & Hayley Schore & Roshan Sethi	January 21, 2018	1LAP01	8.65
Randolph Bell, Chief of Surgery at Chastain Park Memorial Hospital, performs an appendectomy on a patient when an accident involving a tremor in his left hand leads to a severed artery. The patient bleeds out and the incident is covered up by the surgical team. Due to Randolph's high complication rate, his nickname is "HODAD"—Hands of Death and Destruction. Devon Pravesh reports for his first day as a resident intern; he is assigned to third-year resident Conrad Hawkins, who seems "impossible" to work with. Conrad and nurse practitioner Nic Nevin share a private moment in an on-call room, hinting at a romantic relationship. Lily Kendall, a recurrent leukemia patient who is beloved by the hospital staff, is admitted for an infection. A combative woman with endocarditis enters the ER and loses consciousness, giving Devon a chance to run his first code. During a live stream of a surgery in which Randolph operates using the Titian—an advanced robotic surgical tool—Conrad discovers that surgical resident Mina Okafor is actually performing the procedure, unbeknownst to the audience.
2	2	"Independence Day"	Phillip Noyce	Amy Holden Jones	January 22, 2018	1LAP02	4.70
Micah, a 28-year-old schoolteacher with a history of heart disease, collapses in his classroom as Conrad speaks to the students about his journey of becoming a doctor. Conrad performs the precordial thump on Micah, who is taken to the hospital for a heart transplant. During a hunting accident with Randolph and Lane Hunter, Head of Oncology at Chastain Park Memorial Hospital, a congressman collapses due to heart complications and misfires his weapon, shooting one of the hospital's lobbyists. The congressman also needs a heart transplant, causing conflict when a donor heart becomes available. A short-staffed ER forces Conrad to leave Devon to run the ER alone in what Conrad calls "Independence Day"; Devon quickly becomes overwhelmed with his duties, although eventually he pulls through. Lane discharges Lily despite concerns from Devon and Nic.
3	3	"Comrades in Arms"	Rob Corn	Andrew Chapman	January 29, 2018	1LAP03	4.75
A billing consultant is contracted to train staff on how to "upcode" procedures so the hospital can bill higher amounts, causing friction with some of the staff. After she nearly kills a patient with an unneeded MRI, she is fired. Randolph asks a colleague for advice on a hypothetical patient with a hand tremor; benzodiazepines are suggested as a last resort as the negative side effects can include aggression and cognitive impairment. Medical transport worker Louisa Rodriguez collapses from severe back pain and is diagnosed with a retroperitoneal sarcoma. It is found that she is uninsured and an undocumented immigrant, compelling Conrad and Devon to disobey hospital administration and find a surgical team willing to operate. Louisa's procedure is successful, but her rehab will cost the hospital $2 million. Jude Silva—an attending surgeon who previously worked alongside Conrad in the Marine Corps—conveys his frustrations to Conrad about the bureaucracy of medicine and tries to convince Conrad to re-enlist in the military with him.
4	4	"Identity Crisis"	Bill D'Elia	Elizabeth J.B. Klaviter	February 5, 2018	1LAP04	4.87
When the ER budget is cut to cover the costs of Louisa's surgery, the department becomes understaffed and senior nurse Ellen Hundley is let go. During a mass-casualty incident, her inexperienced replacement erroneously triages a patient, who dies from a subdural hematoma and is misidentified, resulting in Conrad notifying the wrong family of their son's death. He subsequently has to treat the correct young man who survives. At the end of the day, Ellen is rehired and finds the John Doe's cell phone, allowing Conrad to call his mother and inform her of her son's death. A woman is admitted to the hospital for what she believes are gallstones and is diagnosed with gallbladder cancer, needing to undergo a risky and experimental operation. Thanks to Bell's now steady hands and experience, he is able to save the woman. Mina is benched for the day when she attempts to directly assist attending surgeon Jen Kays during an operation. Bell enjoys the benefits of the benzodiazepines he's been taking to relieve his hand tremors. Nic has trouble retrieving Lily's medical file from Lane's chemotherapy clinic and goes directly to the clinic where she notices a treatment room that seems overcrowded with patients.
5	5	"None the Wiser"	James Roday	Todd Harthan & Tianna Majumdar-Langham & Chris Bessounian	February 26, 2018	1LAP05	3.86
Randolph starts experiencing negative side effects from the benzodiazepines he's been taking. Three patients are admitted to the hospital: Ed needs an atrophied testicle removed; Christine needs surgery for an abdominal aortic aneurysm; and York requires a procedure to remove a foreign object from his colon. All three surgeries are scheduled concurrently with Randolph performing the procedures and Mina assisting. During York's operation, Bradley—a surgeon just completing a 30-hour shift—faints, setting off a series of events and Mina is subsequently subject to a morbidity and mortality conference to address an accident that occurred during one of the procedures. Nic confides in Conrad about her suspicions of Lane's treatment protocols and encourages Lily to seek a second opinion, prompting Lane to ban Nic from treating any of her patients. Marshall Winthrop—an investor looking to grant financial assistance to the hospital—is revealed to be Conrad's father.
6	6	"No Matter the Cost"	David Rodriguez	Nkechi Okoro Carroll	March 5, 2018	1LAP06	4.08
Nic informs Devon she believes Lane is committing insurance fraud by overtreating her patients; Devon resists the accusation. Lily is scheduled for a bone marrow transplant, but her blood tests reveal she is in acute kidney failure and the transplant would kill her, convincing Devon of Nic's suspicions. An ER patient, Nigel, comes in for an injured ankle and tells Conrad he has been suffering from chronic digestive pain of unknown origin that has negatively impacted his quality of life for 10 years. Exhausted from countless tests with no results, he gives Conrad 24 hours to find the cause. Randolph stops taking the benzodiazepines and learns that brain surgery is his only other option to cure his hand tremor. Nic reveals to Mina that her sister is a recovering addict and discovers that Mina has been treating underprivileged people out of her apartment. Marshall meets with Conrad to inform him that he plans to open a small, private hospital and he wishes for Conrad to manage it.
7	7	"The Elopement"	Rob Corn	Kevin Falls	March 12, 2018	1LAP07	3.80
In a board meeting, Claire discusses repair of the hospital's reputation after she announces they have fallen out of the "Top 50 Hospitals" in the U.S. News & World Report. An arrogant baseball pitcher suffering from deep vein thrombosis is brought in by concierge physician, Spalding Massero, and is admitted to the hospital's V.I.P. wing. After sexually harassing Nic, Conrad confronts him. Randolph's hand tremor returns and he approaches Mina to assist him in his surgeries. Darryl, a 70-year-old man with stage IV lung cancer, is given an extremely poor prognosis, but refuses treatment so he can spend more time with his wife. Conrad vouches for Darryl's wishes but Lane overrides him, making Conrad suspicious. He agrees to investigate Lane's practices with Devon and Nic. To circumvent the issues they encounter in gaining access to Lane's clinical files, Devon intentionally piques the interest of his journalist fiancée, Priya.
8	8	"Family Affair"	Thomas Carter	Story by : Kevin Falls; Teleplay by : Nkechi Okoro Carroll & Zachary Lutsky	March 19, 2018	1LAP12	4.22
A homeless woman wanders into a charity event being held at Chastain Park Memorial Hospital; she appears to be in a state of psychosis. It is discovered that she was illegally dropped off by another hospital and is revealed to be Sara Ravenscroff, the daughter of a wealthy and prominent family in Savannah, Georgia. Conrad and Nic disagree with her original diagnosis of paranoid schizophrenia and they race against the clock to find the right diagnosis before her parents have her committed. In the end it is discovered that Sara is suffering from Wegener's Disease and in her case the disease was attacking her brain. She is successfully treated, and has a happy tearful reunion with her parents, and thanks Conrad and Nic for believing her. Meanwhile Devon's parents visit him and Priya to discuss details of their upcoming wedding. Devon's families are in different classes within the Indian caste system, causing tension between Devon and his father, and his parents start to believe he is ashamed of them. They later wander into the gala and meet Lane. After Devon locates them, they are both shocked and touched when Devon brags about them to Lane, and Lane reveals that Devon is always talking about his wonderful parents. ER doctor Irving Feldman teams up with Devon to treat a male escort who ran through a glass door. Micah comes in for a check-up and displays a romantic interest in Mina.
9	9	"Lost Love"	Bronwen Hughes	Amy Holden Jones	March 26, 2018	1LAP08	4.21
Conrad's ex-fiancée enters the ER experiencing abdominal pain. Nic is unaware that Conrad was previously engaged and questions how well she really knows him. Claire informs Randolph that she will be terminating the employment of physicians with a high complication rate and that she has installed audio recording devices on every camera in each OR. Worried that her treatment is killing her, Lily asks Nic for a referral to seek a second opinion. After being admitted for an adverse reaction to her chemotherapy, Lane discovers that Lily has sought a second opinion and that Nic provided the referral. She orders Nic to administer a high dose of potassium to Lily over the course of 8 hours. Lane is seen entering Lily's room after Nic leaves for the evening; Lily goes into cardiac arrest shortly after and dies despite Conrad's desperate efforts to revive her.
10	10	"Haunted"	David Crabtree	Andrew Chapman	April 16, 2018	1LAP09	4.30
Distracted by the thoughts of Lily's death, Conrad collides into a bicyclist while jogging, injuring his ankle. Claire announces that an autopsy of Lily's body will be performed to determine the cause of death; Lane is questionably open and encouraging of the procedure. Neurosurgeon Dr. Eileen Jacoby—one of Conrad's medical school professors and Mina's idol—is admitted to the hospital because she is seeing the ghosts of patients she had lost. The second-richest man in China is admitted to the V.I.P. wing to have a tumor excised. Complications occur after Randolph completes the surgery and Jude performs an emergency operation. After accusing Randolph of malpractice, his privileges at the hospital are suspended, prompting him to leave the hospital permanently. Lane flirts with Randolph and suggests that a doctor needs to replace Claire as the hospital's CEO. After spending a night with Nic, Conrad lies awake, haunted by the ghost of Lily.
11	11	"And the Nurses Get Screwed"	Liz Allen	Elizabeth J.B. Klaviter & Peter Chen	April 23, 2018	1LAP10	3.96
During an operation performed by Randolph, a spark from a cautery tool causes a fire and the patient is left badly burned. An investigation is held by the hospital's risk management department after Lily's parents sue the facility for wrongful death. Lane is interviewed, pinning the blame on Nic, who is informed that Lily died from a potassium overdose. Conrad, Devon, and Nic begin looking for errors in Lane's other patients. While working the ER with Irving, Devon encounters a patient with cyberchondria. Claire calls an emergency board meeting to discuss the fire in the OR in conjunction with Randolph's complication rate. The tables are turned on Claire when Randolph, Lane, and a skilled anesthesiologist accuse her of trying to save money over patient safety. Claire is fired and Randolph is declared the hospital's new CEO. Nic is fired by Randolph after officially being declared liable for Lily's death.
12	12	"Rude Awakenings and the Raptor"	James Roday	Michael Notarile	April 30, 2018	1LAP11	3.91
After finishing a 30-hour shift, surgical resident Bradley falls through the glass ceiling of a conference room. Randolph deduces that it's a suicide attempt, but Conrad and Devon disagree and start searching for medical proof. Randolph orders Mina to give a tour of the facilities to a talented but extremely arrogant cardiothoracic surgeon, AJ Austin, in hopes of recruiting him to the hospital's staff. Nic confronts Lane in a coffee shop and informs her that she is aware of Lane's history in Nashville where she practiced under her married name, Lane Derzius. In her search for the truth, Nic meets with a former colleague of Lane's, who confirms her suspicions. She returns home to find a strange man at her doorstep; he proceeds to intimidate her in efforts to dissuade her from investigating Lane any further.
13	13	"Run, Doctor, Run"	James Roday	Todd Harthan & Tianna Majumdar-Langham & Chris Bessounian	May 7, 2018	1LAP13	4.01
A woman is admitted to the hospital for a severe headache that is causing hallucinations. Being uninsured, Conrad and Devon must diagnose and treat her before Randolph finds out and discharges her. Nic finds a way to solve her problem involving the man who has continued to stalk and intimidate her. A former patient brings his mother into the hospital, who ends up needing an "awake" surgery performed by AJ and Mina. Nic finds her sister, Jessie, on the floor of her home, suffering from an OxyContin overdose; she administers Narcan and takes Jessie to the hospital. A peer from Nic's nursing school—who works at Lane's clinic—agrees to give Nic medical files to help her investigate Lane. Nic realizes she has been set up after she enters the building in the middle of the night and the police arrive. She calls Conrad from jail and asks him to take her sister to a rehab facility.
14	14	"Total Eclipse of the Heart"	Rob Corn	Amy Holden Jones & Andrew Chapman	May 14, 2018	1LAP14	4.29
After spending the night at Mina's apartment, Micah begins having heart troubles and is readmitted to the hospital. A repeat hypochondriac returns to the ER, informing Devon that Lane has diagnosed her with lymphoma; her test results reveal that she has no cancer markers. Conrad's father posts bail for Nic and she is released. Conrad and Devon update Nic on Lane's doing and they contact the FBI. The three inform Randolph of their actions and he is forced to relieve Lane of all her patients and hospital privileges. He notifies her that the FBI have been contacted and offers to help her forge and burn documents. As she leaves her clinic with incriminating files, she is met by Randolph and the FBI, and is arrested. Nic is subsequently rehired and Conrad's father becomes the chairman of the board at the hospital, essentially becoming Randolph's superior.

=== Season 2 (2018–19) ===
No. overall	No. in season	Title	Directed by	Written by	Original release date	Prod. code	U.S. viewers (millions)
15	1	"00:42:30"	Rob Corn	Todd Harthan & Elizabeth J.B. Klaviter	September 24, 2018	2LAP01	4.88
A blackout requires the staff to treat their patients without the help of any technology: Bell orders the staff to stop accepting new patients, Conrad and Devon go against the mandate to help a child, and Mina and Austin must perform heart surgery on a newborn. The blackout proves to be the work of a cyberattack by Joplin, a young woman who in desperation had only been trying to wipe out her family's crippling medical bills but had inadvertently caused more damage than she had intended; after Nic realizes what she did a remorseful Joplin provides Nic and Conrad with a backup that she had made of the hospital's computers, allowing them to reverse the damage. Sympathetic to Joplin's plight, Conrad and Nic convince Bell to blame the power outage on the bad weather.
16	2	"The Prince & The Pauper"	Nicole Rubio	Amy Holden Jones & Andrew Chapman	October 1, 2018	2LAP02	4.88
Bell grows frustrated when Conrad's dad and new chairman of the board requests Conrad's input in his discussions about hospital expenses; a sharp and sophisticated medical device representative tries to promote her costly products. Bell gets arrested for ‘soliciting’.
17	3	"Three Words"	Paul McCrane	Marqui Jackson	October 8, 2018	2LAP03	4.92
Nic and Conrad diagnose a happy husband and wife who are both admitted to the hospital with mysterious symptoms. Turns out they got a disease from inhaling bad fumes in their pottery workshop. Bell and Marshall butt heads on a work trip about the saline shortage. Marshall decides to create his own saline factory; A.J. turns down a request from Bell to use certain medical devices despite Mina's forewarning. The new medical device representative take an interest in Devon and teaches him how to dance for his wedding.
18	4	"About Time"	Geary McLeod	Marc Halsey	October 15, 2018	2LAP04	4.68
Chastain is flooded with concertgoers when a stampede at a music festival leaves many in need of doctors; Bell stirs the pot when the hospital's revered orthopedic surgeon demands a better resident.
19	5	"The Germ"	Jann Turner	Jen Klein & Elizabeth J.B. Klaviter	October 22, 2018	2LAP05	4.78
Bell decides to use a new medical device company rather than the hospital's usual products; Kit and AJ must stop their feuding to team up against him; Conrad and Nic work to make a child's dreams come true after finding out his cancer has returned.
20	6	"Nightmares"	David Crabtree	Todd Harthan & Andrew Chapman	October 29, 2018	2LAP06	4.97
Conrad must diagnose a young woman who gets admitted after having extreme night terrors; Devon faces his first Halloween in the emergency room; Nic panics over her decision to bring her newly sober sister to Mina's epic annual Halloween party.
21	7	"Trial & Error"	Rob Greenlea	Chris Bessounian & Tianna Majumdar-Langham	November 5, 2018	2LAP07	4.93
When drug trial patients start suffering life-threatening side effects, Nic fears that her sister Jessie may be in danger; Nic and Conrad try to convince Bell that the trials are not worth the risk; Devon uses Julian to test a product he's designed.
22	8	"Heart in a Box"	James Whitmore Jr.	Marqui Jackson & Joshua Troke	November 19, 2018	2LAP08	4.41
Conrad goes head-to-head with Bell after he recommends a risky medical device; Lane contacts Bell from prison wanting to negotiate. Nic fears Conrad becomes overly attached to a patient; Mina and Austin grow closer while working on a difficult heart transplant; Devon embarks on a very difficult day where Priya says she is moving to San Francisco and wants him to choose between being a doctor and moving with her. Julian discovers QuoVadis is lying about making their parts in China.
23	9	"The Dance"	Rob Corn	Amy Holden Jones & Andrew Chapman	November 26, 2018	2LAP09	5.09
Devon's doubts about his relationship reach a peak as his friends and family gather for his big wedding day; as Chastain's medical device company continues to succeed, Julian considers quitting. Conrad continues to grow closer to his father who suffers a severe medical complication, leaving his life hanging in the balance.
24	10	"After the Fall"	Edward Ornelas	Marc Halsey & Jen Klein	January 14, 2019	2LAP10	5.51
When Lane Hunter is released from prison, her victims are outraged, and Bell, who posted her bail, is dealing with her manipulations. Lane is later murdered by the husband and brother of two of her female victims; his wife was temporarily paralyzed and his sister died under her care. Conrad copes with his father's medical complication by working on a case of a patient that is dealing with issues from Hunter's treatments with Kit, Mina and AJ. Devon gets worried when he doesn't hear from Julian. Nic secures a primary care physician for the hospital's free clinic.
25	11	"Operator Error"	Timothy A. Good	Elizabeth J.B. Klaviter & Emily Pressley	January 21, 2019	2LAP11	5.38
A medical device fails on Bradley, causing his death, and making QuoVadis blame AJ for a medical error, and Mina and Bell work to get to the bottom of the issue. Devon helps a woman with mysterious stomach pain. Nic's bond with Alec grows stronger, as does Conrad's with the Barnett family.
26	12	"Fear Finds a Way"	Bronwen Hughes	Todd Harthan & Michael Notarile	January 28, 2019	2LAP12	5.28
Flu season masks an incredibly infectious disease that Conrad, Nic, and Alec rush to contain when Meg, Nic's favorite guard from her time in prison, gets infected. Devon and Irving treat Sam, a patient with the same disease as Meg. Mina tests QuoVadis devices in an attempt to defend AJ from the claims that a medical error caused Bradley's death. However, AJ benches himself to find humility after QuoVadis' claims. Conrad tries to take the next step in his relationship with Nic, and it results in an argument between them.
27	13	"Virtually Impossible"	Valerie Weiss	Amy Holden Jones & Eric I. Lu	February 4, 2019	2LAP13	5.42
Conrad, Kit, and AJ help a med student in need of a triple organ transplant, due to cystic fibrosis, which draws the attention of Bell. Julian's car is found in a nearby lake, but not her body, which leads Devon to do some detective work of his own. Mina and AJ beg Bell to end his business with QuoVadis. Nic forces Jessie to go back to rehab after discovering she has relapsed.
28	14	"Stupid Things in the Name of Sex"	David Crabtree	Jen Klein	February 11, 2019	2LAP14	5.24
Conrad tries to surprise Nic with a romantic Valentine's Day dinner, but he ends up giving the reservation to AJ, who gives it to Mina, because Nic had to attend family day at Jessie's rehab facility. Conrad makes it up to Nic by providing an impromptu Valentine's dinner in the back of his car. Mina and Micah have a development of their own, when he proposes to her, and she can't give an answer. Mina and Devon's neighbor dies suddenly, leaving them searching for answers. Bell decides to spend the day in the OR, Kit provides a patient with a sex injury some dating advice, and Irving and Jessica make their relationship public.
29	15	"Queens"	John Brawley	Jenny Deiker Restivo	February 18, 2019	2LAP15	5.13
When Henry Barnett experiences complications from the VNS device, Bell's confidence in QuoVadis continues to waiver, and forces Conrad to make a risky decision to save his life. Mina's mother, famous Nigerian surgeon, Dr. Josephine Okeke, visits to help her on a case for Mina's friend, Adaku, and her past comes to light for all to see.
30	16	"Adverse Events"	Bronwen Hughes	Marc Halsey	March 4, 2019	2LAP16	5.12
Bell discovers that long-time custodian Simon is seriously ill and attempts to treat him. Nic and Alec struggle to treat an old patient of Alec's who lacks medical insurance. Following the near death of Henry Barnett due to the QuoVadis device, the staff attempts to stop Gordon Page once and for all as Gordon prepares to implant hundreds of soldiers with his devices. In the end, thanks to Conrad's father, the overseas origin of the devices is exposed to the military, stopping the implanting at the last minute. With QuoVadis in danger of failing, Marshall calls Gordon to supposedly offer him his help.
31	17	"Betrayal"	Robert Duncan McNeill	Andrew Chapman	March 18, 2019	2LAP17	5.15
After Dr. Benedict is severely wounded in a supposed suicide attempt, the team struggles to keep him alive as Marshall Winthrop implements a plan to take down Gordon Page once and for all with the help of the FBI. At the same time, the team treats a young college student who becomes deathly ill after contracting mononucleosis, complicating things as both Benedict and the student need the same device to save their lives. Thanks to a clue from Benedict, Marshall and Conrad manage to provoke Gordon into confessing to Benedict's attempted murder. Gordon initiates a car chase with the police, ending with Gordon's death when he crashes his car and it explodes.
32	18	"Emergency Contact"	Satya Bhabha	Marqui Jackson & Michael Notarile	March 25, 2019	2LAP18	4.97
Julian Booth is revealed to be alive and the source that exposed QuoVadis' fraud. Kit's ex-husband Brett arrives at the hospital with a serious illness. Kit is forced to make an impossible choice about Brett's treatment for him and promises to help Brett through recovery. Conrad and Alec treat Valerie, an Olympic hopeful who is revealed to have both male and female characteristics and testicular cancer. Marshall Winthrop decides to leave Chastain and take over QuoVadis to lead the medical device industry in a new direction and to aid Julian in holding corrupt companies like QuoVadis accountable. Julian and Devon realize that for the time being, her work will keep them apart. Nic is forced to deal with the return of her estranged father and her sister who is facing a serious medical crisis. Mina decides to accept Micah's proposal, but he breaks up with her.
33	19	"Snowed In"	Kelli Williams	Eric I. Lu & Daniela Lamas	April 1, 2019	2LAP19	5.28
When Atlanta gets hit by a blizzard, AJ gets trapped in the storm while trying to get to Chastain to help Mina with a case. Due to AJ being trapped in the storm, Mina must do surgery on a young father who has severe hypothermia and is in cardiac arrest by herself. Meanwhile, Bell and Kit babysit his two, young kids. Nic and Conrad disagree on the course of treatment of a patient who has a DNR order and is due to enter hospice care, and it causes issues in their relationship. Conrad also notices that Alec has feelings for Nic and she reveals the truth to him about the situation, and they agree to discuss it. Jessie starts dialysis treatment for kidney failure. Devon teaches a med student a valuable lesson about life and death.
34	20	"If Not Now, When?"	Rob Corn	Amy Holden Jones & Tianna Majumdar-Langham & Chris Bessounian	April 15, 2019	2LAP20	4.55
When an expectant couple come into Chastain with complications, the mother is rushed to deliver via Caesarean section, but then she begins experiencing complications and both her husband and Devon fight to get help for her, with little success. Eventually, they run a scan and discover her bladder was lacerated during the surgery and that she is bleeding internally. They rush to repair the damage with the help of AJ and Mina, but it is too late and she dies in the OR. In response, Bell implements a new series of procedures and regulations on the suggestion of Devon and Mina to try to prevent such a thing happening again. Meanwhile, Nic and Conrad agree that they are in different places in their relationship and agree to step away from it. Jessie needs a kidney transplant, and Nic decides to get tested to rush the process so Jessie doesn't have to be on dialysis for much longer. Nic also witnesses a drive by shooting and helps the family involved get the help needed to save their lives. This episode is based on the real-life story of Kira Dixon Johnson, who died after complications of a routine Caesarean section at Cedars-Sinai in California on April 13, 2016. Her husband, Charles Johnson IV, now advocates with a foundation he started in her honor called 4Kira4Moms to help bring awareness to the maternal mortality crisis in the US. He uses it push legislation so that other women won't suffer Kira's fate. This is the favorite episode of series creator Amy Holden Jones.
35	21	"Stuck as Foretold"	Paul McCrane	Jen Klein & Joshua Troke	April 22, 2019	2LAP21	4.85
Nic struggles to deal with Jessie's deteriorating condition and her father's unwillingness to donate his kidney; Alec later offers a solution and asks Nic what she is willing to do to save Jessie. Bell treats the mother of his assistant Grayson who tests positive for gonorrhea and whom Bell formerly had a relationship with; AJ gets information on his birth parents. While volunteering with Georgia Search and Rescue, Conrad rescues Fritz, a young college student who suffered serious injuries following a camping trip with his best friends, experiencing a hemolytic reaction. Fritz's condition is complicated by a blood shortage, forcing AJ to operate in a hyperbaric chamber without sufficient blood. Conrad donates his own blood despite the risks, allowing the surgery to succeed and Fritz reconciles with his friends. At the end of the episode, a message is shown about the seriousness of the blood shortage in America, which is covered by the events of the episode and asks the viewer to donate.
36	22	"Broker and Broker"	Jann Turner	Todd Harthan & Elizabeth J.B. Klaviter	April 29, 2019	2LAP22	5.16
Desperate to help her sister, who is now in multi-organ failure, Nic goes with Alec to meet an organ broker to buy a kidney, however, when Conrad hears about it he confronts Alec and Nic. Nic decides to not buy from the organ broker after her discussion with Conrad, but to try to convince her father to donate to Jessie. Alec decides to leave Atlanta because he realizes that Nic will always love Conrad, and it's time for him to move on with his life. Conrad also convinces Bell to put Jessie on the transplant list, despite her not meeting the qualifications. Chastain is strapped for money, and Bell is desperate to find funding. He tries talking to the son of a deceased donor, who refuses to continue donations, and to a lottery winner, who decides to donate, it's just not the sum of money Bell needs to keep Chastain running. Mina can't remember her night out after waking up on a golf course and tries to piece it together after AJ benches her from surgery.
37	23	"The Unbefriended"	Rob Corn	Andrew Chapman & Amy Holden Jones	May 6, 2019	2LAP23	5.01
A John Doe comes in with a brain bleed, leaving the doctors with the choice of treating him or not due to the lack of insurance information. After seeing the man for himself, Bell allows the surgery to go forward and the man recovers and identifies himself and gives them his wife's information. Mina's ex Micah comes in with a new girlfriend, forcing AJ to pass on the bad news; Mina chooses not to speak with Micah and move on with her life. With Jessie's condition deteriorating, Nic convinces Kyle to donate his kidney; the transplant is a success though Jessie is not completely out of danger. Chastain's new anesthesiologist turns out to be a drug addict who has an overdose in the OR, nearly killing Kyle. It's later discovered that she lost her license in Pennsylvania and lied on her records. Bell is offered a deal to sell the hospital, but it would result in his power as CEO being curtailed. Conrad and Nic rekindle their relationship after Nic promises to meet Conrad halfway on taking the next steps in moving the relationship forward. Later, Jessie crashes and dies despite Conrad's best efforts.

=== Season 3 (2019–20) ===
No. overall	No. in season	Title	Directed by	Written by	Original release date	Prod. code	U.S. viewers (millions)
38	1	"From the Ashes"	Rob Corn	Amy Holden Jones	September 24, 2019	3LAP01	4.05
The doctors of Chastain are surrounded by new rules and doctors, as Red Rock Mountain Medical takes over the hospital. Conrad finds himself in a dangerous situation when the construction for a new neurosurgery center causes a gas explosion causing him to get injured while helping rescue an eight-year-old boy, Jonah, who ran away from the ER, and his friend, Annie, who was working down in the basement of the building at the time of the explosion. Jonah suffers from an internal decapitation, that Kit repairs surgically. AJ and Mina get all the shrapnel out of Annie's chest, just to find out later on that she has a brain tumor, which neurosurgeon Barrett Cain removes with a complicated surgery. Mina acts as a support for Nic, who is struggling with losing her sister, Jessie, from complications of a kidney transplant. Nic eventually takes Mina's advice and spreads Jessie's ashes in a field of her favorite flowers.
39	2	"Flesh of My Flesh"	James Whitmore Jr.	Elizabeth J.B. Klaviter	October 1, 2019	3LAP02	3.84
Cain tries to recruit Bell and Kit to join him on a dangerous surgery called "the mother of all surgeries" to help a mother of seven with an extreme form of cancer, with the intent of garnering publicity for the hospital by doing a segment with Montel Williams. The Raptor finds himself with an emotional attachment to a patient, who turns out to be his biological father, whose life is put in his hands when it is discovered that he needs surgery. Mina’s friend, Adaku, arrives at the hospital announcing that she is pregnant, and Mina reveals her worries about the situation. Devon moves out of the ER to do an oncology rotation. Nic tells Conrad that she is ready to move in with him, and she surprises him with a house that he had previously shown her.
40	3	"Saints & Sinners"	Paul McCrane	Todd Harthan & Andrew Chapman	October 8, 2019	3LAP03	3.66
When a police officer shows up to the ER with an injured criminal that he caught in the act, it’s up to the Chastain staff to keep him alive in order to save an innocent life. However, it turns out that the police officer needs medical care too, but is reluctant until he passes out in the ER. Nic gets roped into a surgical rotation with Cain that leaves her questioning the way he operates. So much so, that she ends up stopping one of his scheduled surgeries when she realizes the patient doesn't have what she was originally diagnosed. Cain ends up offering Nic a permanent position on his staff and a pay raise. Conrad makes a shocking discovery when one of his patients dies from a pulmonary embolism after starting dialysis, the same thing that killed Nic's sister, Jessie, and four other patients in the past six weeks. Conrad tells this to Nic and they resolve themselves to look into it. Bell pursues a new fiscal venture in the medical supplement field with backing from his assistant's father.
41	4	"Belief System"	Ti West	Marqui Jackson	October 15, 2019	3LAP05	3.74
Devon’s patient, who was pronounced dead, suddenly revives. They find out the patient lives a vampire lifestyle with his girlfriend, that is causing him to show symptoms of HFE hereditary haemochromatosis. Devon tells Conrad he has issues with some of the things Conrad does to help patients. A well-known white supremacist, Hades, reveals he has multiple personality disorder. Under the care of Cain and Nic, the two butt heads on waiting for Hades' psych records. On their way to a medical convention, AJ and Mina get stuck in a strange town, where they uncover new information about Red Rock Mountain Medical being negligent about the environment and careless after they shut down a small town's only hospital. This experience allows Mina and AJ to both realize their feelings for the other are stronger than they both reveal to others.
42	5	"Choice Words"	Edward Ornelas	Marc Halsey	November 5, 2019	3LAP04	3.40
After a plane crashes in Atlanta, Devon is overcome by guilt. He thinks that he could have prevented it by reporting a pilot to the FAA for being drunk during his previous flight. Although it's later revealed that the pilot wasn't the one who flew the plane, he did witness the crash after arriving to work buzzed. Witnessing the crash scared him into thinking about how the next could be his fault. He admits he needs help and asks Devon for an AA brochure. Conrad and Devon help a passenger on the plane, with her injuries from the crash and learn she was previously diagnosed with narcolepsy, only to find out that she doesn't have narcolepsy. They're able to convince Cain to perform surgery, and the patient is cured. She is overjoyed to learn that she now can make her own choices. Bell, who was a passenger on the plane, escapes the crash with only a herniated disk makes it his personal mission to save the life of the man seated next to him. Adaku returns to ask Mina to be the godmother for her baby. Dr. Austin tells his adoptive parents about meeting his biological father. Conrad and Nic consider risking it all to investigate a drug that might be linked to Jessie’s death.
43	6	"Nurses' Day"	Steve Robin	Jen Klein	November 12, 2019	3LAP06	3.67
Chastain’s nurses are severely understaffed and overworked. So much so, that Jessica ends up crashing her car on her way home. Cain performs a dangerous surgery, which inserts four new metal vertebrae, on a new patient. Complications of the surgery force Kit to repair Cain's errors. Conrad discovers that his father has been taking the same drug that he fears played a role in Jessie’s death. AJ comes face-to-face with his birth mother for the first time and he realizes she isn't as bad as he thought she was. Devon and Irving treat a jockey that realizes it is time to retire after suffering from a job related injury. Irving attempts to take the next step in his relationship with Jessica.
44	7	"Woman Down"	Kelli Williams	Jessica Ball	November 19, 2019	3LAP07	3.90
Jessica is brought into the emergency room with life-threatening injuries. The staff rallies around each other to try to save her life, while disagreements over how to best handle her care put Cain at odds with the rest of the team. When Jessica's blood won't clot, Conrad searches for answers, which he gets after Cain has already taken her in for a second surgery. During this ordeal, Irving realizes that he really loves Jessica and doesn't want to lose her. Cain confronts Conrad over him questioning his methods. When Bell reports the nursing shortage that Nic brought to his attention to Red Rock, he meets their new VP, Logan Kim, who got his job through Cain. Conrad gets data about Hemopleatin through Bell. Kyle begins volunteering at the hospital and ends up helping Nic on the floor when she only has a nursing student as support. Conrad, discovering that Hemopleatin is even more dangerous than he had thought, brings it to the attention of Bell and Kim. However, Kim and Cain recognize that Conrad is a whistleblower and could be a threat to them in the future.
45	8	"Peking Duck Day"	Dawn Wilkinson	Marc Halsey & Eric I. Lu	December 3, 2019	3LAP08	4.28
Devon and Irving are inundated with patients on Thanksgiving “the most dangerous day of the year,”. Patients with injuries related to various Thanksgiving activities. When an A-list celebrity enters the hospital after swallowing a wish bone, Logan Kim assigns a new surgeon to the case in the hopes of garnering extra publicity. However, the surgery is more complex than the new surgeon can do. Bell steps in to perform the surgery. Tensions run high at AJ's home when he hosts his biological and adoptive families for a Thanksgiving dinner. Kyle interrupts Nic and Conrad’s low-key plans with a surprise. Bringing a former addict to cook Thanksgiving at their house. This event leads to a heart to heart between Nic and Kyle who both realize they are struggling with Jessie's death more than they thought.
46	9	"Out For Blood"	David Crabtree	Elizabeth J.B. Klaviter & Michael Notarile	November 26, 2019	3LAP09	3.52
Devon gets a real-life princess as his patient and diagnoses her with a rare medical condition. When Cain's surgery to fix it goes wrong, Bell and AJ step in to save her life. Kyle bonds with an elderly patient, but oversteps his bounds. Conrad helps save the patient from an undetected life-threatening condition. Nic later overhears her father expressing his pride in her. Conrad falls into trouble over the patient who he tortured to save a man's life. Red Rock's VP threatening to fire Bell if he doesn't help them bring down Conrad. Bell is disgusted with being forced to turn against one of his own doctors and warns Kit Voss that the trouble is only just beginning.
47	10	"Whistleblower"	Rob Corn	Amy Holden Jones & Andrew Chapman	December 17, 2019	3LAP10	3.85
Devon works his last day as an intern. Devon and Conrad are faced with a moral dilemma over a suicidal patient who is in need of a liver transplant after taking too much acetaminophen and sleeping pills. They decide to lie about him being suicidal to get the liver. Conrad is about to be promoted to Chief Resident and planning on proposing to Nic. Bell discovers that Cain is keeping brain dead patients alive to boost his survival rates and to add to Red Rock’s profits. He decides to take matters into his own hands, but is stripped of his title as Chief of Surgery. Red Rock decides to promote Cain to the position. Adaku goes into early labor, causing her to undergo an emergency caesarean section and emergency heart surgery simultaneously to save her and the baby. Both mom and baby survive, but Mina is left with worries on how to care for both of them. At the end of the episode, there is a message urging people who may be suicidal to seek help with the number listed to the National Suicide Prevention helpline.
48	11	"Free Fall"	Jann Turner	Todd Harthan & Tianna Majumdar-Langham & Chris Bessounian	January 7, 2020	3LAP11	3.74
After being terminated from Chastain, Conrad has difficulty figuring out his next step and distracts himself by accompanying a patient with muscular dystrophy, Finn, on a zero-gravity adventure. Another client, Reggie, has a heart attack during the adventure, and Conrad stabilizes him enough to get him to Chastain for treatment. The experience inspires Conrad to fight for getting his job back. In his first move as the new Chief of Surgery, Cain puts the doctors on a commission-based pay system, which causes Devon’s new intern, Eline, and another doctor to agree to a procedure before weighing all the risks, causing the patient to have a heart attack. Nic and AJ treat Annie who has gone into remission, but requires a risky surgery for an infection, leading to Cain and AJ clashing. Mina struggles with taking care of Adaku’s baby. Bell's supplement company gets its big break, but Cain wants his cut of Bell's success, while also wanting to get close to Bell's business partner, Andrea.
49	12	"Best Laid Plans"	Satya Bhabha	Jen Klein & Daniela Lamas	January 14, 2020	3LAP12	3.91
While working at their non-profit clinic three hours outside of Atlanta, Nic and Mina treat a patient with a failing heart VAD, forcing them to find a new battery in time to save her life. They can't find a battery, so they try to get her to Chastain in time, but the patient's VAD battery dies. However, the patient still lives even with the battery dead, revealing her heart had healed to the point she didn't need the device anymore; only now they must rush to Chastain to remove the device before a blood clot really does kill her. Conrad gets a call from a previous patient, Archer, in crisis after being sued by Red Rock for medical expenses he can’t afford. He's so distraught, he tries to commit suicide. Bell promises to try to help him resolve the billing issue. Devon’s VIP patient, Nadine, returns to the ER with a bump on her head. Cain tries to get close to Bell’s business partner, Andrea, from the supplement company. At the end of the episode, there is a message urging people who may be suicidal to seek help with the number listed to the National Suicide Prevention helpline.
50	13	"How Conrad Gets His Groove Back"	Julie Hébert	Marqui Jackson & Joshua Troke	January 21, 2020	3LAP13	4.01
Devon struggles prioritizing surgical patients for rooms, resulting in an ER patient suffering a stroke after being boarded in the hall. Conrad, Bell and AJ struggle to treat Dax, a rookie pro soccer player from Georgia FC with strange symptoms. Kim bans Conrad from the hospital but Bell and AJ continue secretly consulting with Conrad about Dax; after Conrad saves Dax's life, the team owner hires Conrad as the new team doctor which Conrad is able to leverage to get reinstated at Chastain as chief resident. Nic realizes that Kyle has become suicidal and convinces him to seek help. Having bonded with Adaku's baby, Mina is having trouble letting go. At the end of the episode, there is a message urging people who may be suicidal to seek help with the number listed to the National Suicide Prevention helpline. Corbin Bernsen, who plays Kyle Nevin, directly addresses the audience as part of the message.
51	14	"The Flea"	Rob Greenlea	Jessica Ball & Jenny Deiker Restivo	January 28, 2020	3LAP14	4.08
Cain is less than pleased to have Conrad back despite his lucrative deal with Georgia FC but Kim warns that Cain's expenses are starting add up for the worse. Devon and Feldman treat three patients with different symptoms that suddenly drastically escalate; Devon determines that they have organophosphate poisoning with the one common factor being Bell and Andrea's new supplement company. After reports of other patients at other hospitals, Bell buys out Cain and their other investor to buy them some time. Conrad treats two of Chastain's biggest donors who suffered a serious jet ski accident; the wife Becky has a propeller embedded in her abdomen while her husband John's benign brain tumor is discovered to have grown back. Conrad and Cain are forced to work together when John's condition suddenly deteriorates with Conrad going so far as to defend Cain to Kim. Andrea considers a relationship with AJ and seeks advice from Mina.
52	15	"Last Shot"	Timothy A. Good	Marc Halsey	February 18, 2020	3LAP15	3.93
The new neurosurgery center opens, though the doctors have to deal with various technical issues. One of the first patients is Lucy, the foster daughter of Annie, an old patient of Nic's; after Lucy's body temperature rises drastically during the surgery, Cain refuses to stop in order to impress some donors and the surgery succeeds after Nic resolves the complication. Mina, AJ and Dr. Torres treat Tyrone and Aaron who both require a heart transplant; due to Tyrone developing a temperature, Aaron gets the heart, leaving Tyrone with only a short time to live. However, Aaron suffers a catastrophic stroke that leaves him brain dead and Tyrone receives the heart; having previously hated Aaron, Tyrone gains a new appreciation for his roommate after learning just how much he actually meant to the young man. Bell continues promoting his supplement company, going on a talk show, but one of the organophosphate poisoning patients at another hospital dies and so nearly does one of Chastain's patients. Conrad and Devon investigate and with all signs pointing to the company, Bell decides to take responsibility out of remorse for putting so many people's lives in jeopardy. At the last minute, Conrad and Devon realize that the link is to an online clothing store and not Bell's company; Bell is later given the opportunity to expand his message to people through his own talk show after impressing the host with his honest approach. AJ and Andrea grow closer as do Mina and Torres.
53	16	"Reverse Cinderella"	Sheelin Choksey	Emily Pressley	March 3, 2020	3LAP16	4.82
The doctors prepare to attend a royal ball celebrating Nadine's birthday while Feldman and Jessica get engaged. Devon treats a famous stylist who turns out to have been eating her own hair, making him late to the ball where he is Nadine's escort. At the ball, Nadine's father announces that she must return home to assume her royal duties rather than continuing to remain in America like Nadine wants. Logan Kim's attempts to schmooze the king end badly, but Bell is able to use the situation to get Kim to stop Red Rock's plan to shut down Chastain's OBGYN department, suspected by Bell and Conrad to be to save costs due to the new neurosurgery center. The ball ends with the king's pregnant goddaughter collapsing and being rushed to Chastain where she gives birth to a baby with his heart outside of his chest; Mina and AJ are unsure if they can save the baby as the condition has a low survival rate. After the ball, Nic suggests marrying Conrad, causing him to finally propose properly to her and the two get engaged.
54	17	"Doll E. Wood"	Li Lu	Eric I. Lu & Amy Holden Jones	March 10, 2020	3LAP17	3.74
While singing at a drag show, Joseph, a Dolly Parton impersonator, collapses and requires surgery that could destroy his ability to sing. While initially reluctant to accept, Bell is able to use their mutual love of Dolly to talk him into it; after the surgery, performed with the help of Ezra, now on a surgical rotation, Bell expresses hope that Joseph will be able to sing again. Nic realizes that a young girl in the ER is a victim of human trafficking and enlists Conrad's help to save her; Conrad and Nic get her pimp arrested and the girl is reunited with her mother by social services. AJ, Devon and Torres treat the baby born with his heart outside of his chest, requiring the aid of a world-class doctor from Atlanta General Hospital. However, the doctor proves to be an alcoholic and they are forced to allow her to drink so that she can walk the team through the very delicate surgery; though the baby faces further surgery down the line, they are successful. Nadine prepares to return home at her father's insistence and she and Devon agree to continue their relationship long-distance after Devon rejects an offer to be a doctor in her home country; Conrad and Nic announce their engagement to their friends.
55	18	"So Long, Dawn Long"	Vanessa Parise	Andrew Chapman & Nate O'Mahoney	March 17, 2020	3LAP18	4.77
Dawn Long, the patient from the "mother of all surgeries," is brought back to Chastain after getting sick. Upon discovering that it has been six months, Cain chooses to finally remove the brain dead Dawn from life support as her statistics will no longer be tracked and to everyone the surgery will have been a success. Before Dawn's family allows her to die, Cain secretly orders tests to determine the source of her illness, circumventing Conrad and Devon. As Bell's new talk show grows more popular, he is removed from the surgical schedule by Logan Kim, but he is called in by AJ to help save Bill Landry, the owner of Georgia FC, in a marathon surgery. Conrad and Nic help Kit Voss treat her son-in-law Derek who is discovered to have cancer with a fifty percent survival rate; despite chemotherapy complications, he makes it through the night thanks to his medical student wife. At the end of the episode, Cain receives a call revealing that Dawn Long was infected with candida auris, a dangerous superbug, one that is almost impossible to remove from a building once it spreads. As Cain rushes to spread the word, the people cleaning her room become exposed and her contaminated ventilator is moved into a storage room with multiple other ventilators, possibly contaminating them as well. The episode begins with a title card stating that while the episode is relevant with the coronavirus pandemic, it was written and conceived months before and superbugs of all kinds existed then as now and any relationship to current events is coincidental. The title card also announces support for hospital staff and first responders that risk their lives on a daily basis.
56	19	"Support System"	Kelli Williams	Marqui Jackson & Michael Notarile	March 24, 2020	3LAP19	4.54
Cain and Kim attempt to contain the candida auris contamination while covering up its existence; after Conrad and Devon's patient Sophia, an EMT, is possibly exposed, Cain discreetly enlists Ezra's help to treat her, having been threatened by Kim into keeping silent despite Cain's desire to come forward. Conrad figures it out on his own and Cain confesses to Ezra that as an intern he didn't speak up, costing four patients their lives before Red Rock and Ezra's mother intervened to save him; Ezra reluctantly helps Cain cover up the mistake with Sophia but comes clean after Sophia dies. Conrad confronts Cain who is left guilt-ridden over his inaction when coming clean earlier may have saved Sophia's life. Nic and AJ treat Isaac, a young man who requires a lung transplant, but lacks any sort of support system; the two help Isaac find what is potentially his biological family who agree to help support him either way. With Derek's condition deteriorating, he requires a ventilator and gets Dawn Long's still-contaminated one. The episode begins with a title card stating that while the episode is relevant with the coronavirus pandemic, it was written and conceived months before and superbugs of all kinds existed then as now and any relationship to current events is coincidental. The title card also announces support for hospital staff and first responders that risk their lives on a daily basis.
57	20	"Burn It All Down"	Edward Ornelas	Tianna Majumdar-Langham & Chris Bessounian & Daniela Lamas	April 7, 2020	3LAP20	5.09
AJ and Mina treat Miguel, a salsa dancer in heart failure; though they are successful in saving Miguel, he decides to retire. Nic treats Justine, a patient who developed a brain infection from a damaged tooth; Justine is revealed to be Cain's ex-girlfriend from college and reveals surprising details about his past to Nic and the two are shown to clearly still love each other. The hospital succeeds in containing the candida auris contamination and no one else tests positive. However, while Derek's recovery from his cancer finally shows success, he is blinded by the candida auris he got from Dawn Long's ventilator which is drug resistant; the treatment for Derek ends up requiring Cain's help at the same time that Justine needs him. With Cain's help, Derek's life is saved but it is unknown if Derek will regain his eyesight; despite Cain's best efforts, Justine ultimately dies leaving Cain utterly devastated. After the superbug infestation is leaked to the media, Kim offers to make Conrad the new face of the hospital while implying that Cain's time at Chastain may be coming to an end after Cain stands up to Kim's threats.

=== Season 4 (2021) ===
No. overall	No. in season	Title	Directed by	Written by	Original release date	Prod. code	U.S. viewers (millions)
58	1	"A Wedding, A Funeral"	Rob Corn	Daniela Lamas & Eric I. Lu	January 12, 2021	4LAP01	3.92
During the COVID-19 pandemic, the staff of Chastain does their best to treat the overwhelming number of patients that they face while also trying to protect their loved ones; however, Cain focuses on performing elective surgeries rather than helping out. Nurse Hundley gets the virus and her health steadily declines despite best efforts and Kit Voss is exposed and becomes sick; Devon's father, a cab driver, also gets the virus. Ultimately, Devon's father dies of the virus, but both Hundley and Kit survive. After Kit's exposure, Logan Kim risks his job to get the staff the proper protective equipment that they need using his family connections in South Korea, earning him some of Conrad's respect. In the future, Conrad and Nic are married in a ceremony attended by their friends and loved ones aside from Devon who flies home for his father's memorial. At the wedding, AJ reveals that he broke up with Andrea and he confesses his feelings to Mina; the two share a kiss. The episode begins with a title card stating that it is sometime in the future when the COVID-19 pandemic is history. The episode ends with a dedication to the health care professionals who risk their lives daily for us all.
59	2	"Mina's Kangaroo Court"	Rob Corn	Peter Elkoff & Marqui Jackson	January 19, 2021	4LAP02	3.42
Logan Kim is fired for his unauthorized use of funds during the pandemic; before leaving, Kim warns Conrad that things are about to get a lot worse at Chastain. Mina and AJ treat a man who Cain had lied to during the pandemic in order to perform an elective surgery on him which resulted in the patient getting COVID-19 and as a result, blood clots currently. Mina, AJ and Cain manage to save the patient, but AJ, sympathetic to Cain and believing that he can be redeemed, refuses to report him; Mina goes against AJ's wishes and informs the patient's wife and she and AJ agree to take a break for a few days. Conrad and Devon treat Congresswoman Nichelle Randall who wants to become Georgia's next governor; Conrad eventually discovers that Nichelle had an affair with her driver and lied about it and both contracted a parasitic infection in the Caribbean. Devon experiences hallucinations of his dead father and opens up to Conrad about the details he'd learned about his father's death in an understaffed public hospital. Kit Voss tracks down the chairman of Red Rock who reveals that there will be no new CEO to replace Logan Kim, but refuses to elaborate further. At home, Nic reveals to Conrad that she's pregnant while Bell tries to reconnect with his long-estranged former step-son Jake who is both a plastic surgeon and a musician.
60	3	"The Accidental Patient"	Rob Greenlea	Todd Harthan & Marc Halsey	January 26, 2021	4LAP03	3.58
While saving a young woman. Eva's, life at a massive accident scene, Cain is hit by an ambulance and severely injured, damaging his hands and risking Cain's surgical career. Two of Cain's residents decide to start the surgery before Kit can arrive and cause more damage; although AJ and Kit manage to save Cain's life, it is unclear if he suffered brain damage in the process or if he will ever regain consciousness again. Eva is revealed to be in the Witness Protection Program and her ex-boyfriend Darren, whom she left behind upon entering the program, shows up after seeing Eva on TV; Darren helps Conrad and Nic figure out Eva's chronic illness and he decides to join Eva in Witness Protection rather than lose her again. Devon attempts to convince Winston, a dying patient, to call his estranged daughter; after Winston dies, Devon meets his daughter who reveals that Winston called and reconciled with her thanks to Devon. Bell decides to televise his surgery on Emmett Mackey, leading to a disagreement with Mina who believes that Bell is exploiting their patient; the supposedly easy surgery suddenly turns complicated, but Mina and Bell succeed in saving Emmett's life. Bell is motivated by the revelation that Red Rock intends to sell the hospital and a concern that whoever buys it could be worse; after realizing the truth, Mina praises Bell's efforts and offers him her help and later informs AJ. Mina and AJ define their work relationship and Mina informs Nic; Conrad and Nic secretly perform a blood test that confirms Nic's pregnancy.
61	4	"Moving On and Mother Hens"	Rob Greenlea	Jen Klein	February 2, 2021	4LAP04	4.09
Conrad, Nic and Devon work to treat Trinity, a young woman with confusing symptoms and a need to get away from her mother. Trinity's mother has a heart attack, but AJ and Mina successfully treat her while Trinity is diagnosed with a rare but treatable genetic condition; she and her mother reconcile. Bell meets Fiona, a fan of his who has a psychotic break and stalks Bell; Bell and Kit determine that her symptoms are caused by a tumor that they remove and Fiona is left embarrassed by her behavior. Mina faces possible deportation due to an expiring visa and proposes to AJ; after talking with Nic and doing more research, she has second thoughts and calls off the wedding but admits that she is in love with AJ which he reciprocates. Devon continues to struggle with his father's death, complicated by a visit from his mother; after snapping at her, Devon begins to realize that he might not be alright and they open up to each other about their struggles. Conrad and Nic discover that they are having a girl and spread the news to their friends. Bell learns that Red Rock has sold Chastain to developers who intend to turn the hospital into luxury condos.
62	5	"Home Before Dark"	Leslie Libman	Amy Holden Jones & Andrew Chapman	February 9, 2021	4LAP05	3.44
On Chastain's last day open, Nic is stabbed in the abdomen by a drug addict while trying to de-escalate a confrontation; Bell, Mina and AJ manage to save Nic's life in a grueling surgery, but she remains unconscious, leading to fears of brain damage. Devon and Conrad discover from pregnancy bloodwork that was never completed before the techs left that Nic has a thyroid problem due to her pregnancy that's keeping her from waking up and successfully treat it; an ultrasound confirms that the baby had survived the stabbing. Cain regains consciousness, but is unable to breathe on his own and is forced to remain on a ventilator. After learning of the seemingly-hopeless condition of Henry, an elderly patient, Cain offers a radical solution that saves Henry's life; Cain's condition ultimately results in him being transferred to the same crowded long-term care facility that he had sent his own patients to. In order to save Chastain, Bell, Kit and Marshall Winthrop propose to now-Governor Nichelle Randall that the hospital become funded by the state; Randall agrees and Chastain becomes a public hospital instead of a private one.
63	6	"Requiems & Revivals"	Leslie Libman	Michael Notarile & Emily Pressley	February 16, 2021	4LAP06	3.80
Two weeks after being stabbed, Nic remains hospitalized and suffers from PTSD and Conrad reluctantly calls in Nic's old friend Billie Sutton who Conrad had gotten fired for ruining a man's life. Nic suffers complications in her pregnancy due to the blood transfusions that she had received after the stabbing, forcing the doctors to perform another risky blood transfusion; after some uncertainty over whether Nic miscarried or not, the baby is revealed to have survived and is doing better. Initially at odds with one another, Conrad and Billie make amends and Conrad invites her to stay for a few weeks to help to take care of Nic. At the same time, Chastain is flooded with patients due to its status as a public hospital and several doctors quit. Feldman and Devon disagree over the treatment of a patient that Devon believes might've been misdiagnosed with Alzheimer's disease; Devon proves to be right and is elated at the chance to better the care patients receive at a public hospital. Andy, a young boy who lost his hands as a toddler, faces losing his chance to get replacements when his surgeon quits so Bell convinces his former stepson Doctor Jake Wong to perform the surgery which is successful; Jake subsequently accepts Bell and Kit's offer to work at Chastain. Governor Randall and the hospital board search for a new CEO; after Kit stands up to her about Andy's surgery and the lack of female candidates, an impressed Randall offers her the job which she accepts.
64	7	"Hero Moments"	Edward Ornelas	Marc Halsey & Marqui Jackson	March 2, 2021	4LAP07	3.57
Mina and AJ perform a very rare quadruple heart valve replacement surgery; after AJ gets called away, Mina is forced to perform the surgery on her own, succeeding despite some complications. Conrad gets a call from Captain Nate Hill, his former commanding officer in Afghanistan who is injured in a fall; Conrad reveals to Nic that Nate had saved his life after Conrad had disobeyed orders, but in the process he had suffered a career-ending bullet wound. While treating Nate, Conrad discovers that the bullet has migrated to Nate's neck and AJ is able to finally remove it; Nate subsequently makes amends with Conrad and urges Conrad to let go of his guilt. Devon treats Rose, a sickle cell anemia patient who requires a hip replacement; after some trouble with a blood transfusion, Devon arranges for Rose's dance students to hold a mini-recital for her in the hospital. Mina continues to worry about deportation, but AJ tells her that after the surgery, she has proven her skill and no longer needs him as a mentor; AJ also believes that the surgery will help Mina's case. Cain is finally able to breathe on his own, but is warned by Kit that he may never operate again; Cain orders his lawyer to find the whistleblower at Chastain that got him into legal trouble. Jake continues to reject Bell's attempts at reconciliation, eventually admitting that he and his husband are adopting a child and he is afraid that Bell will disappoint him and his child if he lets Bell in again; Bell later tells Kit that he and Jake are going to have coffee together, Bell having promised not to let Jake down again after Kit urged Jake to give him a chance.
65	8	"First Days, Last Days"	Edward Ornelas	Tianna Majumdar-Langham & Chris Bessounian	March 9, 2021	4LAP08	3.46
Conrad and Feldman treat Megan, a newlywed who is apparently dying of Huntington's disease; after Megan's symptoms don't add up, Conrad realizes that she is actually suffering from Wilson's disease. On Nic's first day back, Jay, the man who had stabbed her, comes into the hospital with a tear in his heart; after a conversation with Billie about trauma, Nic finally begins to move past the incident. A new intern, Leela. arrives at Chastain, but angers Devon and AJ with her inconsistent behavior; Leela helps to save Jay's life in the OR and Devon realizes that she has dyslexia and promises to support her. Cain returns to Chastain for physical therapy, but doesn't do well and snaps at Devon's sickle cell patient Rose; after Kit expresses doubt about Cain's future at Chastain, he breaks down in the bathroom. Mina faces an investigation for her illegal clinic and dating Micah and AJ; realizing that Cain is responsible, AJ confronts Cain and threatens him into dropping the investigation; however, when Cain tries, he learns that it's too late to call it off. At Nic's request and needing to save the neurosurgery department, Kit offers to reinstate Billie's residency on a trial basis which Billie agrees to. Nadine returns to Atlanta with a surprise for Devon; when Nadine arrives at Chastain, she brings with her a baby, presumably Devon's son.
66	9	"Doors Opening, Doors Closing"	Li Lu	Jen Klein & Joshua Troke	April 13, 2021	4LAP09	3.54
Tina, the mother of Jake and his husband Greg's future child is rushed into the ER with a gallbladder infection, forcing Bell to perform an emergency C-section to save both mother and child when Tina's condition worsens; Tina's traditional parents arrive at the hospital and threaten to disown her if she allows a homosexual couple to adopt the baby despite Bell's attempts to intercede on their behalf, leaving Jake and Greg heartbroken. Devon's old sickle cell patient Rose collapses during physical therapy and requires a spleen removal during which time she cannot have a blood transfusion; Mina and AJ flawlessly pull off the surgery together. With only a week until her visa expires and months for her appeal to be decided, an exhausted Mina chooses to willingly return to Nigeria and AJ decides to come with her. Devon learns that Nadine's child is from an arranged marriage that she had entered into after returning to her home country; after seeking Nadine's advice, Devon allows his patient Myra, a matchmaker, to begin helping him to look for somebody. Cain continues his physical therapy and befriends Rose, inspired by her positive attitude and reminded of an old friend of his who had died of the same disease; Feldman and Jessica elope at an aquarium.
67	10	"Into the Unknown"	Kelli Williams	Andrew Chapman & Emily Pressley	April 20, 2021	4LAP10	3.52
Just when Mina and The Raptor can see their future together, an unexpected complication throws a wrench in their plans; Cain faces a harsh reality when Kit gives him the opportunity to prove he is ready to return to the operating room.
68	11	"After the Storm"	Pablo Gómez Castro	Peter Elkoff & Eric I. Lu	April 27, 2021	4LAP11	3.29
A tornado strikes the hospital, collapsing the ambulance bay roof and trapping Devon and Leela in one of the labs. A paramedic, Piper, is severely injured in the bay collapse and the team is forced to perform an emergency amputation to get her out; however, Piper dies in the OR despite the best efforts of Kit and Billie. Devon and Leela are trapped with Ted, a maintenance worker with a piece of metal impaled in his head; after losing their phone connection to Cain, Devon and Leela are forced to perform brain surgery on their own using just Ted's power tools; the two succeed in stabilizing Ted until they are rescued and Cain can take over. Sammie, a young girl recently adopted from China, is brought into the hospital when her abdominal cancer symptoms worsen; Bell, AJ and Jake perform an extremely rare autotransplant surgery to remove the cancer, but Sammie's condition proves to be more serious than expected and she will require years of constant care and possibly more surgeries. Sammie's adoptive parents are unable to handle this and decide to relinquish her to the adoption agency, upsetting Jake in particular as he had grown close to Sammie. Now back at work, Cain clashes with Billie as he doesn't want residents after his last ones nearly killed him, but Cain and Billie reach a place of mutual respect and he welcomes her to the team. Rose returns to the hospital after suffering a fall which proves to be minor, but Cain has been avoiding her; Cain reveals to Billie that he's afraid of getting close to Rose only to lose her after his ex-girlfriend died on his operating table the year before. Nic finally agrees to go on maternity leave while AJ struggles with the departure of Mina.
69	12	"Hope in the Unseen"	Rob Corn	Daniela Lamas & Michael Notarile	May 4, 2021	4LAP12	3.43
As Nic and Conrad prepare for a spa day, they learn that Pete, a patient who has become a shut-in since the COVID-19 pandemic began, has missed three appointments and check in on him, only to have Pete collapse; the two eventually determine that Pete is suffering from a vitamin c deficiency as a result of his eating habits and not leaving his home. After returning home, Conrad treats Nic to a makeshift at home spa treatment. Cain is reluctant to return to surgery, but on Billie's insistence, he takes on a "softball" surgery; when something goes wrong, Cain momentarily freezes and ultimately leaves Billie to finish the surgery. Rose undergoes the experimental gene therapy to cure her sickle cell anemia, but she develops an infection and requires dialysis; with Rose refusing further treatment, Devon enlists Cain's help and Cain convinces Rose to change her mind, promising that he won't let her suffer if nothing can be done; Devon expresses a belief that the dialysis will only need to be temporary. Still struggling with the departure of Mina, AJ snaps at Leela in surgery, causing her to consider transferring to Bell; AJ later makes amends with Leela. AJ's mother is discovered to be eligible for a targeted treatment that will extend her life by years, giving hope to AJ's family. Marshall Winthrop and the Chastain board inform Kit that only has two weeks to come up with a solution to lessening the hospital's millions of dollars of debt; after learning that BioSouth is on the verge of bankruptcy, Kit and Marshall offer to partner with the company as an angel investor to help save both Chastain and the promising gene therapy.
70	13	"A Children's Story"	Kelli Williams	Marc Halsey & Anthony Chin-Quee	May 11, 2021	4LAP13	3.10
Devon and Leela help at an apartment fire and Leela becomes close to the building's superintendent Douglas Johnson who has a broken rib lodged in his aorta; although Leela and AJ successfully operate, Doug suddenly dies in recovery, devastating Leela despite both AJ and Devon reassuring her that Leela did nothing wrong. Sammie continues to recover from her cancer surgery with Jake and Greg working to adopt her, but she develops a serious complication from her post-op infection; although Bell successfully operates, he, Jake and Greg are left waiting to see if Sammie will make it through the night. Sammie pulls through and shows signs of her infection starting to get better with the ordeal bringing the three men closer together. AJ's mother is brought in for testing and the targeted therapy is proven to have worked; however, AJ still seems to be deeply concerned and doing his best to hide it. Now in a romantic relationship with Cain, Rose returns to the hospital in serious pain, causing her to fear that her treatment failed and that she's in another sickle cell crisis; Devon, having trouble maintaining a professional distance from Rose, has Conrad take the case instead despite Rose being his patient. Rose's pain turns out to be from Rose overexerting herself as she enjoys her new lease on life and Devon is able to deliver the good news that the gene therapy has successfully cured Rose's sickle cell anemia. Billie holds a baby shower for Nic and Billie reveals that when she was raped at thirteen, she got pregnant and gave up the baby for adoption; Billie's son has been trying to get in touch with her, but due to her own fears, Billie tearfully orders him to leave her alone. After the baby shower, Nic announces that she is going into labor and Conrad rushes her to Chastain to give birth. The episode ends with a title card dedicating it to the memory of Rose Elizabeth Honorat, one of the millions who didn't live to see this potential cure for sickle cell disease which exists and is still in clinical trials. The title card expresses a hope that one day it will be widely available and affordable.
71	14	"Past, Present, Future"	Rob Corn	Amy Holden Jones & Andrew Chapman	May 18, 2021	4LAP14	3.05
AJ's mother Carol suffers a broken back due to her spine being weakened from her cancer treatment; AJ chooses to have her transferred to Atlanta General rather than rely on Cain whom he is still angry at over Mina's departure. Billie unsuccessfully tries to convince Cain to help Carol to make up for his actions towards Mina; Cain is given a job offer at Johns Hopkins and considers his options while offering to take Billie with him if she so chooses. When Carol's condition deteriorates, Billie is forced to begin the procedure herself at Chastain despite her fears. Cain, at his job interview with Johns Hopkins, declines AJ's calls. However, Cain arrives in time to help finish the job, but he proudly credits Billie with the save; Cain believes that Carol will walk again, but they can't be sure until she regains consciousness. It is revealed that knowing that AJ would only ever call him for one reason, Cain had run out on his interview to help save Carol's life; AJ informs Cain that he is willing to continue working with him if Cain decides to stay at Chastain after Cain helped to save Carol. Leela's friend Astrid and Jake's friend Roland both require a liver transplant for different reasons so Bell and Devon come up with the innovative idea of transplanting Astrid's damaged but still functional liver into Roland while giving her the one available donor liver; the procedure succeeds in saving both patients. Conrad is disturbed to learn that Phillip Bondman has sold Bio South Labs to a pharmaceutical conglomerate, now making the new sickle cell disease cure incredibly expensive; Devon and Conrad are left feeling betrayed while Kit is left worried about the ramifications of Chastain getting into business with big pharma even though the deal makes the hospital $900,000,000 and settles their debts. Nic gives birth to baby Georgiana Grace “GiGi” Hawkins while Roland's daughter turns out to be a judge who finalizes Jake and Greg's adoption of Sammie. At the end of the day, Billie returns home where she is greeted by her son and Devon and Leela go home together and have sex.

=== Season 5 (2021–22) ===
No. overall	No. in season	Title	Directed by	Written by	Original release date	Prod. code	U.S. viewers (millions)
72	1	"Da Da"	Rob Corn	Amy Holden Jones	September 21, 2021	5LAP01	3.03
An attack by cybercriminals sends the hospital into a tailspin, compromising the care of several patients, and Kit must decide whether to pay the ransom. Teenager Etsy is brought in with serious abdominal injuries after pushing blind man Winston Robards, who broke his arm, out of the way of a car. An old friend of Devon's is able to reverse the damage. Conrad works on balancing life as a new dad; Devon and Leela debate taking the next step in their relationship. Winston collapses in a closet after being exposed to hydrogen sulfide.
73	2	"No Good Deed"	Kelli Williams	Andrew Chapman	September 28, 2021	5LAP02	2.96
Devon is found unconscious in the elevator on the roof from the gas poisoning he'd suffered and after deducing from his symptoms what must've happened to him, the doctors successfully treat him for hydrogen sulfide poisoning; while retracing Devon's steps, Conrad finds Winston who is also treated successfully. At the same time, AJ and Billie treat Janie, a drug addict whose endocarditis has caused a brain aneurysm; Janie's friend Trevor is Billie's estranged son who lashes out at his mother constantly. After learning the truth, AJ gives both mother and son some advice based on his own experiences and he and Billie are able to save Janie's life. Devon and Winston both recover with Devon recalling that he had attempted to get help after turning on the ventilation system, but he had passed out in the elevator on the way to the ER; Devon's quick actions had ensured that Winston only got a small dose of the poison and saved his life; Leela and Devon decide to move in together after the scare. As Kit deals with the hydrogen sulfide crisis, Bell helps her by spending his day considering a possible replacement for Cain only to learn that the man is too good to be true; at the end of the day, Kit asks Bell out on a date which he accepts. Anticipating Nic's return from a spa weekend, Conrad is visited by two police officers who inform him that Nic has been in a car accident on her way home.
74	3	"The Long and Winding Road"	Rob Corn	Joy Blake	October 5, 2021	5LAP03	3.11
Nic is rushed to Chastain following her car crash where its discovered that she has suffered a traumatic brain injury from the impact. As the devastated staff tries to treat her, Nic's condition continues to worsen while Conrad is left in denial over how bad it really is. After Nic's brain herniates, an injury that she can't recover from, Devon is forced to declare her brain dead with the help of Hundley and Jessica while a grief-stricken Kyle blames Conrad for being unable to save his daughter. Respecting Nic's wishes, Conrad agrees to allow her organs to be harvested for transplant before Nic is taken off of life support and dies. During the crisis with Nic, her old COVID-19 patient Gabe Sandoval returns and it's discovered that his trachea was so weakened by being intubated during his illness that he will have to spend the rest of his life on a ventilator; Gabe refuses further treatment despite his wife's attempts to convince him otherwise. However, AJ and Leela are able to convince Gabe to take a rare trachea transplant instead, one that proves to have come from Nic.
75	4	"Now What??"	Rob Greenlea	Peter Elkoff	October 12, 2021	5LAP04	2.94
While spending time with Trevor, AJ is pulled over by Officer Winnaker, leading to a confrontation between the officer and Trevor over the officer's racist behavior; during the confrontation, Winnaker is hit by a motor scooter and severely injured. At Chastain, AJ has Trevor observe as AJ goes above and beyond to save Winnaker's life, enraging Billie that AJ would bring her son around; Billie eventually admits that she's trying to protect her son from the knowledge that he is the product of a rape and AJ agrees to honor her wishes, upsetting Trevor who only sees it as Billie continuing to abandon him. Leela develops serious concerns about Bell's old friend and mentor Doctor Aaron Kranepool, reporting him to Kit; while observing one of Kranepool's surgeries, Bell has to step in when Kranepool makes a mistake that nearly kills his patient. Expressing remorse for his own reckless past that cost patients' lives, Bell convinces Kranepool that his peripheral vision is shot and he must retire. At the same time, Conrad obsessively seeks a medical answer for Nic's fatal car accident without any success; Devon eventually convinces Conrad to give up and start living again. While visiting the accident site a final time, Conrad spots a deer on the side of the road and realizes that Nic had swerved to avoid hitting a deer, causing the accident.
76	5	"The Thinnest Veil"	Paul McCrane	Todd Harthan & Tianna Majumdar-Langham & Chris Bessounian	October 19, 2021	5LAP05	3.31
On Halloween, a coven of witches come into the ER suffering from hallucinations and hyperkalemia; Conrad and AJ eventually realize that one of the younger coven members, Holly, had accidentally poisoned everyone with foxglove and they are all successfully treated. Conrad opens up about the loss of Nic to the coven leader Magdalena who had lost her young son years before. AJ and Devon treat Ethan, a man who is convinced that he is haunted by ghosts; Ethan is eventually diagnosed with a chest tumor which AJ, Billie and Leela remove, but AJ points out that Ethan's belief in ghosts had saved his life as it scared him into going to the hospital where his life-threatening condition was discovered. As Devon and Leela argue over where to live together, AJ tells Devon a ghost story about the hospital and points him to a seemingly-haunted room, causing Devon to go with Leela's choice of apartments. Returning from a vacation, Bell picks up Mike, a hitchhiker that he bonds with. Mike's behavior becomes increasingly disturbing and he eventually forces Bell at knifepoint to disclose the time that he had killed a patient years before; seemingly seeing a kindred spirit, Mike leaves Bell unharmed; upon reaching Chastain, Bell learns that Mike is a serial killer who has been arrested. Conrad holds a dinner with his friends to honor and say goodbye to Nic and a few years later, he celebrates Halloween once again with Gigi.
77	6	"Ask Your Doctor"	David Crabtree	Marc Halsey	November 9, 2021	5LAP06	3.00
Three years after Nic's death, Conrad has left Chastain and gone into private practice as a concierge doctor so that he can better raise Gigi. Conrad brings Jackson, a man with terminal lung cancer, to Chastain to treat an injured finger where a desperate Jackson takes hostages in an attempt to get a supposed miracle drug. After Conrad and Devon, now an attending, talk Jackson down, he attempts suicide without success. Reviewing Jackson's medical records, Conrad and Devon realize that he has been misdiagnosed and work together to properly diagnose Jackson with tuberculosis. While Jackson will have to face criminal charges for his actions, he will be cured with six months of drug treatments. Conrad rejects an offer to return to Chastain, but admits to Gigi that he had the best day that he's experienced in a long time. At the same time, Tamiko, an MMA fighter, collapses at an event that Kit Voss is attending and requires the attention of AJ, Bell and Billie to treat her. During Billie's surgery, she enlists Kit's help to deal with a complication, impressing Kit and saving Tamiko. Having learned that Kit is looking for a new Chief of Surgery, Bell and AJ compete for the job, but Kit decides to give it to Billie instead. Kit and Bell are shown to have continued their relationship as have Devon and Leela while AJ has become a best-selling author. Leela's identical twin sister Padma helps her to realize that she has become so dedicated to her job that she has stopped having fun in her life and Leela decides to take a day off to go on a road trip with Padma and has sex with Devon in his new office shower.
78	7	"Who Will You Be?"	Amyn Kaderali	Emily Pressley	November 16, 2021	5LAP07	3.02
Billie's son Trevor starts his first day as an intern at Chastain where he quickly earns Devon's ire for his arrogance and seeming lack of compassion which leads to Trevor giving an alcoholic a drink in order to prove a point; as a result, Devon threatens to fire him. At the same time, Conrad visits on Kit's request in an attempt to get him to return to work at the hospital; while reluctant to give up his private practice, Conrad agrees to help AJ treat his mother Carol after she suddenly starts becoming ill. Conrad discovers that the immunotherapy that is keeping Carol's cancer at bay is attacking her organs and is now killing her, leaving Carol's only options as to stop the treatment and risk her terminal cancer returning or continue the treatment which will inevitably kill her. After learning of Trevor's predicament, Conrad enlists his help to explain her options to a devastated Carol who struggles with making a decision; Conrad is impressed by Trevor's compassion towards Carol and, remembering his own mistakes on his first day, Devon agrees to give him another chance. Trevor admits to Billie that he had struggled through medical school and his internship at Chastain is his only chance to become a doctor; while he believes that it was thanks to AJ that he had gotten the internship, it's revealed that Billie had actually secretly been responsible. At the end of the day, Conrad decides to accept the offer to work at Chastain again. Throughout the day, Leela struggles with a visit from her overbearing parents, ending in Leela finally snapping at them and storming out; Padma applauds Leela for finally asserting herself so that she can live her own life outside of their parents' expectations.
79	8	"Old Dogs, New Tricks"	Sam Friedlander	Elizabeth Peterson	November 23, 2021	5LAP08	3.02
Kit hires a surgical coach to watch over Bell and Raptor and help them brush up on their skills. Upon receiving attention from multiple women at the hospital, Conrad contemplates jumping back into the dating scene. Devon works with an elderly couple.
80	9	"He'd Really Like to Put in a Central Line"	James Whitmore, Jr.	Peter Elkoff & Daniela Lamas	November 30, 2021	5LAP09	3.38
Conrad mentors Trevor as he struggles with treating a patient who refuses life saving treatment. During a difficult OR case Dr. Bell develops a problem with his right hand and leaves the room, leaving Leela to finish the case alone.
81	10	"Unknown Origin"	Rob Corn	Amy Holden Jones & Andrew Chapman	December 7, 2021	5LAP10	3.02
When the first day of Kit's experimental Flight Go team program sends Conrad out into the field, he builds a new relationship with a fellow doctor along for the ride; Devon works with Trevor on a patient with a mysterious fever.
82	11	"Her Heart"	Kelli Williams	Marc Halsey & Eric I. Lu	February 1, 2022	5LAP11	3.33
Conrad and AJ treat Hannah, a young woman in heart failure who was the recipient of Nic's heart; Conrad eventually diagnoses Hannah with a fistula that has been causing Hannah to forget to take her anti-rejection medication and Billie, Leela and AJ successfully operate to fix the problem. At the same time, AJ pressures Devon to allow his mother Carol into his clinical trial even though she doesn't fit the criteria; Devon chooses to stand by his decision with Carol's support and AJ and Devon put her onto palliative care instead to enjoy what time she has left. Conrad diagnoses Bell with multiple sclerosis and Bell struggles with his diagnosis, deciding to leave Chastain and Kit rather than force her to have to take care of him as his condition worsens. However, Kit refuses to abandon Bell and promises to support him no matter what. Jake visits for the Lunar New Year with Sammie who bonds with Gigi while Leela considers specializing in neurosurgery. After Conrad reveals that she is the recipient of his wife's heart, Hannah allows Gigi to listen to it.
83	12	"Now You See Me"	Li Lu	Anthony Chin-Quee & Joy Blake	February 8, 2022	5LAP12	3.36
While buying new shoes, Devon and Leela become concerned about an obese woman, Roxie, possibly having a heart attack. While treating Roxie, Devon witnesses the difficulties that Roxie faces for her size, particularly from AJ who is bluntly honest about her weight. Eventually, Devon and AJ diagnose Roxie with a tear in her esophagus due to her bulimia; the two successfully fix the problem and help Roxie get treatment for her underlying issues and she expresses gratitude for their fairness to her and AJ's blunt honesty. A young girl is brought into the ER refusing to speak and she is treated by Conrad and Cade who search for her family while fearing that she is a victim of abuse. Discovering that the girl was struck by lightning, Cade tracks down her injured sister Ana in a homeless encampment; Ana reveals that she and her sister Scout had fled from their abusive father after suspecting that he may have murdered their mother. Kit and Leela are forced to perform emergency surgery on Scout's infected leg and are successful in saving it. Winston promises to keep the two together in foster care while Conrad notices that the case struck a little too close to home for Cade and suspects that she might be in trouble. Devon becomes concerned when Leela decides to become double board certified in both neurosurgery and cardiothoracic surgery while Bell competes with Dr. Robert Porter for a spot on the State Medical Board. Recognizing Porter as her rapist, Billie seeks Kit's help to bring Porter's pedophilia to the board's attention without exposing her identity.
84	13	"Viral"	Anne Renton	Tianna Majumdar-Langham & Chris Bessounian	February 15, 2022	5LAP13	3.23
A tragic accident occurs at Jessica's sister's gender reveal party. Conrad, Irving and Trevor work on an influencer whose life is in danger due to a risky cosmetic procedure.
85	14	"Hell in a Handbasket"	Manish Dayal	Emily Pressley	February 22, 2022	5LAP14	3.09
When Billie's past mistakes are exposed, the team struggles to find a way to support her. The nursing shortage hits Chastain. A simple cleaning job goes horribly awry.
86	15	"In for a Penny"	Michael Medico	Elizabeth Peterson	March 8, 2022	5LAP15	3.14
Devon has his first clinical trial patient, Albert, but the treatment causes a number of health problems for Albert who insists upon continuing despite his wife's objections. Devon struggles with following Albert's wishes, but he is ultimately able to help Albert through the treatment with Conrad's help. Leela treats Mariana, an architect whose lung keeps collapsing without apparent cause; Leela eventually diagnoses Mariana with endometriosis, the treatment for which may take away Mariana's fertility which Mariana accepts. Leela later tells Devon that she isn't sure that she will ever want children unlike Devon who wants to have a family; Leela decides to donate her egg to Padma while also freezing some at the same time for the future. Bell becomes frustrated with the bureaucracy of the state medical board and investigates a patient's complaints, promising that he will act even if the board doesn't. While treating a John Doe who has suffered a fatal drug overdose, Cade discovers that he was using a forged prescription with Conrad's name on it and puts him in touch with the FBI. Cade finally reveals that she had worked undercover with the FBI helping to take down pill mills, but she drew the ire of the Mafia in the process. Cade's fear of the mob catching up to her is what has made her move around so much and avoid personal relationships.
87	16	"6 Volts"	Stephanie Martin	Peter Elkoff & Nate O'Mahoney	March 29, 2022	5LAP16	3.14
Conrad and The Raptor help out an old friend whose heart problems reveal a bigger issue than they anticipated. Bell confronts the Medical Board about the cases he's been investigating.
88	17	"The Space Between"	Kimberly Hunt	Marc Halsey	April 5, 2022	5LAP17	3.50
Gigi's best friend Peter becomes deathly ill, putting Conrad and Billie in a difficult situation when it begins to look like the six year old Peter will need a craniectomy; at the last minute Conrad realizes thanks to Gigi that Peter has a rare condition where his body can't process proteins which has been worsened by the protein shake that he had shared with his father. Dialysis clears up the problem just in time to avoid the craniectomy. Devon, Bell and Kit take the interns to a nursing home, hoping that they will become interested in geriatrics; while they are there, a resident, Gloria, collapses. Devon and Zach discover first that she is overmedicated and then that she has an underlying condition masked by her medications that requires surgery; Devon and Zach manage to diagnose Gloria with Whipple's disease, but she dies in surgery despite Bell and AJ's best efforts. Devon points out that Zach is the only doctor who had recognized that there was a bigger picture and suggests that he has a future in geriatrics. At the same time, Padma considers an anonymous sperm donor until Leela demonstrates the dangers of it by revealing that Nolan is one; instead, Padma asks AJ to be the father of her child.
89	18	"Ride or Die"	Diana Valentine	Eric I. Lu	April 12, 2022	5LAP18	3.13
When Conrad confronts a pharmacy owner about fraudulent prescriptions, she turns up dead. The ER is sent in to chaos when both families on the end of a street racing accident are present.
90	19	"All We Have Is Now"	Julie Hébert	Joy Blake	April 19, 2022	5LAP19	3.01
Over the course of several days, AJ stays at his mother's side as Carol gradually worsens and approaches the end with AJ struggling to come to terms with it; Carol eventually passes away in her sleep after encouraging AJ to find love and have a family of his own. At the same time, after the state medical board whitewashes their investigation into several bad doctors, Bell goes public in order to get the doctors taken down, costing him his place on the medical board; Bell subsequently calls out the medical board and the governor for their actions in a live talk show interview. Devon and Conrad treat Bryce, a young man with rabies who appears to be beyond the point of help; the two come up with an innovative treatment, enlisting Billie's help when Bryce's condition worsens. Bryce ultimately survives and although the virus has wreaked havoc on his nervous system, he is expected to make a good recovery. Leela and Padma prepare for the harvesting of Leela's eggs, although it is unclear if AJ will be the donor or not; Leela pushes to have the eggs frozen and Devon's suggestion that he be the donor creates tension between him and Leela. Ultimately, AJ agrees to donate, but only if he can be the baby's father rather than just an anonymous sperm donor.
91	20	"Fork in the Road"	Bosede Williams	Emily Pressley & Mika Frank	April 26, 2022	5LAP20	3.05
Conrad and Cade work with a Medicare patient who sheds some light of prescription fraud. Leela works herself to the brink of exhaustion. AJ and Padma discuss the future of the child. Bell and Kit get engaged.Devon and Leela separate over difference over their future.
92	21	"Risk"	Paul McCrane	Daniela Lamas	May 3, 2022	5LAP21	3.18
When one of the doctors is shot outside the hospital, the ER is put into lock down; a patient learns he is unable to receive a transplant due to his vaccination status; Devon and Leela try to juggle the new dynamics of their relationship.
93	22	"The Proof Is in The Pudding"	Nick Gomez	Peter Elkoff & Elizabeth Peterson	May 10, 2022	5LAP22	2.85
A young boy comes into the hospital with a rare disease which leaves his bones incredibly fragile; with his clinical trial officially being declared a success, Devon has some huge decisions to make about the future of his career.
94	23	"Neon Moon"	Rob Corn	Amy Holden Jones & Andrew Chapman	May 17, 2022	5LAP23	2.90
Conrad struggles with his grief with vivid memories of Nic, while Cade and Billie realize that they both are interested in him. Leela and Padma learn that Padma is pregnant with twins. Cade's father has pancreatic cancer, and following surgery tests show he may be cured. On what was to be Devon's last day at Chastain, he and Leela reach an understanding and agree to try again.

=== Season 6 (2022–23) ===
No. overall	No. in season	Title	Directed by	Written by	Original release date	Prod. code	U.S. viewers (millions)
95	1	"Two Hearts"	Rob Corn	Amy Holden Jones	September 20, 2022	6LAP01	2.71
When Padma's pregnancy takes a dangerous turn, the doctors come together to find a solution and turn to Ian Sullivan. Devon's clinical trial is cancelled and given to another hospital. Dr. Sutton operates on the patient thinking she has a tumor, but it ended up being a parasite. Conrad invites Cade over after Gigi's bedtime. Gigi has recurrent nighmares about a strange man in her bedroom.
96	2	"Peek and Shriek"	Paul McCrane	Joy Gregory	September 27, 2022	6LAP02	2.65
The high stakes governor election results in violence at the polls, causing multiple victims to arrive at Chastain. When Kit has to treat a patient with MS, she pushes for the most aggressive care - no doubt because she thinks of Randolph - and she and Billie do the surgery.
97	3	"One Bullet"	Amyn Kaderali	Andrew Chapman	October 4, 2022	6LAP06	2.69
When a gunshot victim comes into the ER, his injuries prove to be so catastrophic that multiple doctors need to jump on the case and resources are used up. After a number of delays, Padma has a complication while waiting for a C-section, forcing an emergency procedure, but with good outcomes. Dr Sullivan tests positive for benzodiazepines, and while he makes an excuse for it - retesting is ordered for the next week.
98	4	"It Won't Be Like This for Long"	Marie Jamora	Emily Pressley	October 11, 2022	6LAP07	2.71
Ian is faced with performing a surgery on a Jane Doe NICU patient while he continues to struggle with his drug issues, and takes a pill to get through it, and is able to take his repeat drug test by stealing urine from a patient and switching the containers. Conrad gets Devon to cover for him so he can spend some time with Gigi.
99	5	"A River in Egypt"	Bill D'Elia	Daniela Lamas	October 18, 2022	6LAP08	2.64
A college professor comes into the emergency room and Conrad realizes it's his former patient from when he was an intern. Devon meets a man who wanted to pitch a treatment that prevents aging, but he then becomes his patient. Randolph returns from his out of town treatment regime. Padma struggles to adjust to the care of her twins.
100	6	"For Better or Worse"	Manish Dayal	Marc Halsey	October 25, 2022	6LAP03	2.97
On the day of Kit and Bell's wedding, Bell and Conrad get pulled away to tend to the ill daughter of a major hospital donor.
101	7	"The Chimera"	Malcolm-Jamal Warner	Tianna Majumdar-Langham & Chris Bessounian & Eric I. Lu	November 8, 2022	6LAP04	2.98
When a prison doctor believes a death row inmate is lying about his symptoms, Conrad and Raptor are called in to examine him just as he begins to deteriorate. In investigating his symptoms they discover a way to prove his innocence. Kit and Randolph meet with the new governor and it becomes clear he will cut their funding. The discussion becomes heated and Randolph exposes shady dealings in the governor's past - leading him to recruit a new hospital employee to get some dirt on Randolph.
102	8	"The Better Part of Valor"	Stephanie Martin	Richard E. Robbins	November 15, 2022	6LAP05	2.56
After a teenage boy is taken into Chastain for falling unconscious from a suspicious pill, Conrad takes action to find the boy's brother.
103	9	"No Pressure No Diamonds"	Aprill Winney	Mika Frank	November 29, 2022	6LAP09	3.32
Devon is approached by a documentary producer as he prepares to perform the first titanium rib cage implant surgery in the country.
104	10	"Family Day"	Rob Corn	Marc Halsey	December 6, 2022	6LAP10	2.79
Conrad comes face to face with Nic's dad when he comes into Chastain with a low heart rate. Cade visits Ian in rehab; Billie advises her patient against surgery, but proceeds at her sons insistence. She dies after the ill-advised surgery and Billie is then stalked and assaulted by the patient's sons. Conrad rescues her and when he drives her home they share a kiss. Padma contemplates suicide.
105	11	"All In"	Yael Staav	Joy Gregory & Michael Billington	January 3, 2023	6LAP11	2.52
A famous cardiothoracic surgeon - who happens to be Dr. Yamada's mentor - comes into Chastain after experiencing heart pain. AJ and Yamada collaborate with him to make difficult decisions about his treatment. Conrad tells Cade about his feelings for Billie. Padma is diagnosed with postpartum depression. Kit faces the possibility of cutting major services due to the cuts imposed by the governor.
106	12	"All The Wiser"	Julie Hébert	Richard E. Robbins & Tianna Majumdar-Langham & Chris Bessounian Julie	January 10, 2023	6LAP12	2.50
A heavy storm causes a devastating helicopter crash involving Governor Betz. During his treatment it is discovered that his prior heart damage means he requires a transplant and he holds funds needed for the hospital in exchange for a procedure that will rush him to the top of the transplant list - Conrad and AJ agree to his terms. Devon partners with an investor in a trial he doesn't believe in, in exchange for his funding of a trial that will help Randolph. Cade and Yamada become romantically involved.
107	13	"All Hands on Deck"	Rob Corn	Amy Holden Jones & Andrew Chapman	January 17, 2023	6LAP13	2.98
In the series finale, Sammie is rushed to Chastain, deathly ill, bringing Ian back to help amidst concerns that her cancer has returned while Betz experiences problems after his heart transplant. Thanks to an observant Gigi, Sammie is diagnosed with Kawasaki disease, but she develops a coronary artery aneurysm and requires coronary bypass surgery to save her life. At the same time, Betz is diagnosed with an ischemic bowel, requiring Bell to perform surgery on him. Bell experiences an MS flare up during the surgery, but Leela successfully takes over. Ian admits to Kit and Bell his drug addiction, but they allow him to do the surgery as Ian is the only one capable of it; with AJ's help, Ian successfully saves Sammie's life. A week later, Betz keeps his word and publicly announces the full restoration of Chastain's funding, saving the hospital. With Cade's support and the full knowledge of Ian's addiction, Kit allows him to remain at Chastain under constant monitoring of his sobriety. Devon confirms that Bell's MS has progressed which makes him eligible for the second phase of Devon's clinical trial and Bell decides to take a leave of absence and focus on teaching. Padma returns and is happily reunited with the twins with AJ and Leela promising her their full support. Leela becomes an attending and accepts Devon's marriage proposal.

== Ratings ==
=== Season 1 ===
Viewership and ratings per episode of List of The Resident episodes
No.	Title	Air date	Rating/share (18–49)	Viewers (millions)	DVR (18–49)	DVR viewers (millions)	Total (18–49)	Total viewers (millions)
1	"Pilot"	January 21, 2018	2.6/10	8.65	0.8	2.83	3.4	11.48
2	"Independence Day"	January 22, 2018	1.0/4	4.70	0.8	2.77	1.8	7.47
3	"Comrades in Arms"	January 29, 2018	1.0/4	4.75	0.9	3.04	1.9	7.79
4	"Identity Crisis"	February 5, 2018	1.1/4	4.87	0.8	2.95	1.9	7.82
5	"None the Wiser"	February 26, 2018	0.8/3	3.86	0.9	3.24	1.7	7.10
6	"No Matter the Cost"	March 5, 2018	0.9/3	4.08	0.7	2.98	1.6	7.05
7	"The Elopement"	March 12, 2018	0.8/3	3.80	0.7	2.90	1.5	6.70
8	"Family Affair"	March 19, 2018	0.9/4	4.22	0.7	2.87	1.6	7.09
9	"Lost Love"	March 26, 2018	0.9/4	4.21	0.7	2.90	1.6	7.11
10	"Haunted"	April 16, 2018	0.9/3	4.30	0.7	2.89	1.6	7.19
11	"And the Nurses Get Screwed"	April 23, 2018	0.9/3	3.96	0.6	2.74	1.5	6.70
12	"Rude Awakenings and the Raptor"	April 30, 2018	0.8/3	3.91	0.7	2.70	1.5	6.61
13	"Run, Doctor, Run"	May 7, 2018	0.8/3	4.01	0.6	2.62	1.4	6.63
14	"Total Eclipse of the Heart"	May 14, 2018	0.9/4	4.29	0.6	2.68	1.5	6.97

=== Season 2 ===
Viewership and ratings per episode of List of The Resident episodes
No.	Title	Air date	Rating/share (18–49)	Viewers (millions)	DVR (18–49)	DVR viewers (millions)	Total (18–49)	Total viewers (millions)
1	"00:42:30"	September 24, 2018	1.1/5	4.88	0.6	2.86	1.7	7.74
2	"The Prince & The Pauper"	October 1, 2018	1.0/5	4.88	0.7	2.77	1.7	7.65
3	"Three Words"	October 8, 2018	1.0/5	4.92	0.6	2.70	1.6	7.62
4	"About Time"	October 15, 2018	1.0/5	4.68	0.7	2.75	1.7	7.44
5	"The Germ"	October 22, 2018	1.0/5	4.78	0.6	2.72	1.6	7.51
6	"Nightmares"	October 29, 2018	1.0/5	4.97	0.6	2.56	1.6	7.53
7	"Trial & Error"	November 5, 2018	1.0/4	4.93	0.6	2.79	1.6	7.73
8	"Heart in a Box"	November 19, 2018	0.9/4	4.41	0.7	2.83	1.6	7.24
9	"The Dance"	November 26, 2018	0.9/4	5.09	0.6	2.46	1.5	7.55
10	"After the Fall"	January 14, 2019	1.1/5	5.51	0.7	2.76	1.8	8.27
11	"Operator Error"	January 21, 2019	1.0/5	5.38	0.6	2.76	1.6	8.15
12	"Fear Finds a Way"	January 28, 2019	0.9/4	5.28	0.7	2.94	1.6	8.22
13	"Virtually Impossible"	February 4, 2019	1.0/5	5.42	0.7	2.82	1.6	8.22
14	"Stupid Things in the Name of Sex"	February 11, 2019	1.0/4	5.24	0.6	2.59	1.5	7.83
15	"Queens"	February 18, 2019	0.9/4	5.13	0.6	2.75	1.6	7.88
16	"Adverse Events"	March 4, 2019	0.9/4	5.12	0.6	2.80	1.6	7.93
17	"Betrayal"	March 18, 2019	0.9/4	5.15	0.6	2.80	1.5	7.95
18	"Emergency Contact"	March 25, 2019	0.9/4	4.97	0.6	2.71	1.4	7.69
19	"Snowed In"	April 1, 2019	0.9/4	5.28	0.5	2.63	1.5	7.91
20	"If Not Now, When?"	April 15, 2019	0.8/4	4.55	0.6	2.67	1.3	7.22
21	"Stuck as Foretold"	April 22, 2019	0.8/4	4.85	0.5	2.58	1.3	7.43
22	"Broker and Broker"	April 29, 2019	0.9/4	5.16	0.6	2.51	1.4	7.68
23	"The Unbefriended"	May 6, 2019	0.8/4	5.01	0.5	2.42	1.3	7.44

=== Season 3 ===
Viewership and ratings per episode of List of The Resident episodes
No.	Title	Air date	Rating/share (18–49)	Viewers (millions)	DVR (18–49)	DVR viewers (millions)	Total (18–49)	Total viewers (millions)
1	"From the Ashes"	September 24, 2019	0.8/4	4.05	0.6	3.16	1.4	7.22
2	"Flesh of My Flesh"	October 1, 2019	0.7/4	3.84	0.6	2.79	1.3	6.64
3	"Saints and Sinners"	October 8, 2019	0.7/4	3.66	0.6	2.79	1.3	6.46
4	"Belief System"	October 15, 2019	0.7/4	3.74	0.6	2.75	1.3	6.49
5	"Choice Words"	November 5, 2019	0.7/4	3.40	0.5	2.86	1.2	6.27
6	"Nurses' Day"	November 12, 2019	0.7/4	3.67	0.5	2.81	1.2	6.48
7	"Woman Down"	November 19, 2019	0.8/4	3.90	0.4	2.54	1.2	6.44
8	"Peking Duck Day"	November 26, 2019	0.6/3	3.52	0.5	2.82	1.2	6.34
9	"Out for Blood"	December 3, 2019	0.8/4	4.28	0.5	2.42	1.2	6.70
10	"Whistleblower"	December 17, 2019	0.7/4	3.85	0.5	2.50	1.2	6.35
11	"Free Fall"	January 7, 2020	0.7/3	3.74	0.6	2.75	1.2	6.50
12	"Best Laid Plans"	January 14, 2020	0.7/4	3.91	0.5	2.64	1.2	6.56
13	"How Conrad Gets His Groove Back"	January 21, 2020	0.7/4	4.01	0.5	2.64	1.2	6.65
14	"The Flea"	January 28, 2020	0.7/4	4.08	0.6	2.65	1.3	6.73
15	"Last Shot"	February 18, 2020	0.7	3.93	0.5	2.70	1.2	6.64
16	"Reverse Cinderella"	March 3, 2020	0.8	4.82	0.5	2.41	1.3	7.23
17	"Doll E. Wood"	March 10, 2020	0.7	3.74	0.5	2.74	1.2	6.48
18	"So Long, Dawn Long"	March 17, 2020	0.8	4.77	0.5	2.57	1.3	7.33
19	"Support System"	March 24, 2020	0.8	4.54	0.6	2.63	1.4	7.10
20	"Burn It All Down"	April 7, 2020	0.8	5.09	0.5	2.25	1.3	7.35

=== Season 4 ===
Viewership and ratings per episode of List of The Resident episodes
No.	Title	Air date	Rating (18–49)	Viewers (millions)	DVR (18–49)	DVR viewers (millions)	Total (18–49)	Total viewers (millions)
1	"A Wedding, A Funeral"	January 12, 2021	0.7	3.92	0.4	2.18	1.1	6.10
2	"Mina's Kangaroo Court"	January 19, 2021	0.6	3.42	0.2	1.49	0.8	4.91 (Note: Live+3 day ratings have been used due to the unavailability of Live+7 day ratings.)
3	"The Accidental Patient"	January 26, 2021	0.6	3.58	—N/a	—N/a	—N/a	—N/a
4	"Moving On and Mother Hens"	February 2, 2021	0.6	4.09	0.3	1.55	0.9	5.64
5	"Home Before Dark"	February 9, 2021	0.5	3.44	0.5	2.20	1.0	5.64
6	"Requiems & Revivals"	February 16, 2021	0.6	3.80	0.4	2.08	1.0	5.88
7	"Hero Moments"	March 2, 2021	0.6	3.57	0.4	2.41	1.0	5.98
8	"First Days, Last Days"	March 9, 2021	0.6	3.46	0.4	2.27	1.0	5.73
9	"Doors Opening, Doors Closing"	April 13, 2021	0.5	3.54	0.5	2.12	1.0	5.66
10	"Into the Unknown"	April 20, 2021	0.5	3.52	0.4	2.06	0.9	5.58
11	"After the Storm"	April 27, 2021	0.5	3.29	0.4	2.19	0.9	5.48
12	"Hope in the Unseen"	May 4, 2021	0.6	3.43	0.3	1.83	0.9	5.25
13	"Finding Family"	May 11, 2021	0.5	3.10	0.4	1.99	0.8	5.09
14	"Past, Present, Future"	May 18, 2021	0.5	3.05	0.3	1.98	0.8	5.03

=== Season 5 ===
Note: Live+3 day ratings have been stated where Live+7 day ratings are unavailable.

Viewership and ratings per episode of List of The Resident episodes
No.	Title	Air date	Rating (18–49)	Viewers (millions)	DVR (18–49)	DVR viewers (millions)	Total (18–49)	Total viewers (millions)
1	"Da Da"	September 21, 2021	0.5	3.03	0.2	1.60	0.7	4.63
2	"No Good Deed"	September 28, 2021	0.4	2.96	—N/a	—N/a	—N/a	—N/a
3	"The Long and Winding Road"	October 5, 2021	0.5	3.11	0.2	1.55	0.7	4.66
4	"Now What??"	October 12, 2021	0.5	2.94	0.3	1.87	0.7	4.81
5	"The Thinnest Veil"	October 19, 2021	0.4	3.31	0.3	1.85	0.7	5.16
6	"Ask Your Doctor"	November 9, 2021	0.5	3.00	0.2	1.34	0.7	4.34
7	"Who Will You Be?"	November 16, 2021	0.5	3.02	0.3	1.81	0.7	4.83
8	"Old Dogs, New Tricks"	November 23, 2021	0.4	3.02	0.3	1.73	0.6	4.75
9	"He'd Really Like to Put in a Central Line"	November 30, 2021	0.5	3.38	0.3	1.74	0.8	5.12
10	"Unknown Origin"	December 7, 2021	0.4	3.02	0.2	1.68	0.6	4.70
11	"Her Heart"	February 1, 2022	0.5	3.33	—N/a	—N/a	—N/a	—N/a
12	"Now You See Me"	February 8, 2022	0.4	3.36	—N/a	—N/a	—N/a	—N/a
13	"Viral"	February 15, 2022	0.4	3.23	—N/a	—N/a	—N/a	—N/a
14	"Hell in a Handbasket"	February 22, 2022	0.4	3.09	0.2	1.25	0.6	4.33
15	"In for a Penny"	March 8, 2022	0.5	3.14	0.3	1.88	0.7	5.02
16	"6 Volts"	March 29, 2022	0.4	3.14	0.2	1.89	0.6	5.03
17	"The Space Between"	April 5, 2022	0.4	3.50	0.2	1.53	0.6	5.03
18	"Ride or Die"	April 12, 2022	0.4	3.13	0.2	1.58	0.6	4.71
19	"All We Have Is Now"	April 19, 2022	0.4	3.01	0.2	1.71	0.6	4.72
20	"Fork in the Road"	April 26, 2022	0.4	3.05	0.2	1.67	0.6	4.72
21	"Risk"	May 3, 2022	0.4	3.18	—N/a	—N/a	—N/a	—N/a
22	"The Proof Is in The Pudding"	May 10, 2022	0.3	2.85	—N/a	—N/a	—N/a	—N/a
23	"Neon Moon"	May 17, 2022	0.4	2.90	—N/a	—N/a	—N/a	—N/a

=== Season 6 ===
Viewership and ratings per episode of List of The Resident episodes
No.	Title	Air date	Rating (18–49)	Viewers (millions)	DVR (18–49)	DVR viewers (millions)	Total (18–49)	Total viewers (millions)
1	"Two Hearts"	September 20, 2022	0.4	2.71	0.2	1.60	0.5	4.31
2	"Peek and Shriek"	September 27, 2022	0.3	2.65	0.2	1.67	0.5	4.31
3	"One Bullet"	October 4, 2022	0.3	2.69	0.2	1.55	0.5	4.25
4	"It Won't Be Like This for Long"	October 11, 2022	0.4	2.71	0.2	1.50	0.5	4.21
5	"A River in Egypt"	October 18, 2022	0.3	2.64	0.2	1.73	0.5	4.36
6	"For Better or Worse"	October 25, 2022	0.4	2.97	0.2	1.53	0.5	4.50
7	"The Chimera"	November 8, 2022	0.4	2.98	0.2	1.63	0.6	4.61
8	"The Better Part of Valor"	November 15, 2022	0.3	2.56	0.2	1.60	0.5	4.16
9	"No Pressure No Diamonds"	November 29, 2022	0.4	3.32	—N/a	—N/a	—N/a	—N/a
10	"Family Day"	December 6, 2022	0.4	2.79	—N/a	—N/a	—N/a	—N/a
11	"All In"	January 3, 2023	0.3	2.52	0.2	1.79	0.5	4.31
12	"All The Wiser"	January 10, 2023	0.3	2.50	0.2	1.76	0.6	4.27
13	"All Hands on Deck"	January 17, 2023	0.4	2.98	0.2	1.62	0.6	4.60

=== Summary ===
==== Seasons 1–3 ====
The Resident : U.S. viewers per episode (millions)

Season	Episode number																						
Season	1	2	3	4	5	6	7	8	9	10	11	12	13	14	15	16	17	18	19	20	21	22	23
1	8.65	4.70	4.75	4.87	3.86	4.08	3.80	4.22	4.21	4.30	3.96	3.91	4.01	4.29	–								
2	4.88	4.88	4.92	4.68	4.78	4.97	4.93	4.41	5.09	5.51	5.38	5.28	5.42	5.24	5.13	5.12	5.15	4.97	5.28	4.55	4.85	5.16	5.02
3	4.05	3.84	3.66	3.74	3.40	3.67	3.90	3.52	4.28	3.85	3.74	3.91	4.01	4.08	3.93	4.82	3.74	4.77	4.54	5.09	–		

Audience measurement performed by Nielsen Media Research

==== Seasons 4–6 ====
The Resident : U.S. viewers per episode (millions)

Season	Episode number																						
Season	1	2	3	4	5	6	7	8	9	10	11	12	13	14	15	16	17	18	19	20	21	22	23
4	3.92	3.42	3.58	4.09	3.44	3.80	3.57	3.46	3.54	3.52	3.29	3.43	3.10	3.05	–								
5	3.03	2.96	3.11	2.94	3.31	3.00	3.02	3.02	3.39	3.02	3.33	3.36	3.23	3.09	3.14	3.14	3.50	3.13	3.01	3.05	3.18	2.85	2.90
6	2.71	2.65	2.69	2.71	2.64	2.97	2.98	2.56	3.32	2.79	2.52	2.50	2.98	–									

Audience measurement performed by Nielsen Media Research
