= The Resident (TV series) =

2018 American medical drama television series

- Genre: Medical drama
- Created by: Amy Holden Jones; Hayley Schore; Roshan Sethi
- Showrunners: Todd Jason Harthan; Andrew Chapman
- Starring: Matt Czuchry; Emily VanCamp; Manish Dayal; Shaunette Renée Wilson; Bruce Greenwood; Merrin Dungey; Melina Kanakaredes; Moran Atias; Malcolm-Jamal Warner; Glenn Morshower; Jane Leeves; Morris Chestnut; Jessica Lucas; Anuja Joshi; Miles Fowler; Kaley Ronayne; Andrew McCarthy
- Composer: Jon Ehrlich
- Country of origin: United States
- Original language: English
- No. of seasons: 6
- No. of episodes: 107 (list of episodes)

Production
- Executive producers: Amy Holden Jones; Antoine Fuqua; Phillip Noyce; Oly Obst; David Boorstein; Todd Harthan; Marc Halsey
- Production locations: Atlanta, Georgia
- Camera setup: Single-camera
- Running time: 43–45 minutes
- Production companies: Fuqua Films; 3 Arts Entertainment; Nickels Productions (seasons 2–6); Up Island Films; 20th Television (Note: Credited as 20th Century Fox Television for the first three seasons.)

Original release
- Network: Fox
- Release: January 21, 2018 – January 17, 2023

The Resident is an American medical drama television series that aired on Fox from January 21, 2018, to January 17, 2023. The series premiered on Fox as a mid-season replacement during the 2017–18 television season. The series focuses on the lives and duties of staff members at fictional Chastain Park Memorial Hospital in Atlanta, Georgia, with generally a critical eye into current issues of medical practice and tensions in the healthcare industry.

Created by Amy Holden Jones, Hayley Schore, and Roshan Sethi, the series was purchased by Fox from Showtime in 2017. In May 2017, Fox ordered the project to series, with a 14-episode season order. The series premiere was a lead-out to the Vikings-Eagles NFC Championship Game. In May 2021, the series was renewed for a fifth season, which premiered on September 21, 2021. In May 2022, the series was renewed for a sixth season, which premiered on September 20, 2022. In April 2023, the series was canceled after six seasons.

== Cast and characters ==
=== Main ===
- Matt Czuchry as Dr. Conrad Theodore Hawkins: the titular resident. A third-year resident (later attending physician) in Internal Medicine at Chastain Park Memorial Hospital, he is a former Navy Corpsman who served with the Marines in Afghanistan, which is where he learned some of his unconventional medical techniques. It is mentioned that Hawkins has PTSD.

In season 3, he also gets a job as the team doctor for Georgia FC. At the beginning of the series, he and Dr. Bell often clash with different medical practices each uses and the cost of treatment but over time they seem to mend fences and work quite well together.

Over the seasons, Hawkins becomes close friends with his resident Devon Pravesh. In the pilot Pravesh is introduced as an eager Harvard medical grad and Hawkins a doctor whose military background has led to his practicing "cowboy medicine".

Hawkins and Nic Nevin, a nurse practitioner, had a relationship prior to the start of the series. They broke up but by the end of season 1, they get back together. In the season 4 premiere, they get married. They have a daughter, Georgiana Grace "Gigi" Hawkins.

Following Nic's death in season 5, Hawkins quits his job at Chastain and works in private practice as a concierge doctor for the next three years to have more time with his young daughter. He does return to Chastain.

In season 5, Hawkins starts to develop feelings for Billie Sutton. (One of Nic’s best friends, she had joined the hospital before Nic's death.) Hawkins is involved for a while in Season 6 with Kincaid Sullivan, but afterward he and Billie admit their feelings to each other. They are still together by series end.

- Emily VanCamp (seasons 1–5) as Nicolette 'Nic' Marie Nevin, a nurse practitioner at Chastain Park Memorial Hospital. She is Conrad's love interest, and they marry after years together. A caring and compassionate nurse, Nic will go the extra mile for her patients.

In season 1, she is arrested and framed by Dr. Lane Hunter, after learning that Hunter is giving chemotherapy to healthy people and telling them that they have cancer to make a profit. The framing is discovered, and Nic is exonerated by the end of season 1. It is revealed that Nic's mother died when she was young, and that her younger sister Jessie became dependent on her. Later Jessie became addicted to drugs. In season 2, after years of drug abuse, Jessie needs a kidney transplant. She can't wait enough time after getting clean. Nic convinces their undependable father to donate a kidney, as she is not a match. The two start to rebuild their relationship. Even with the kidney transplant, Jessie dies in the season 3 premiere.

Nic becomes close to surgical resident, Dr. Mina Okafor from Nigeria. The latter has to return to Nigeria. Later in the series, Nic is best friends with Dr. Billie Sutton. It is revealed that the two have been best friends since they were kids.

Prior to the start of the series, she and Conrad were in a relationship and were even expecting to have a baby together. But after a miscarriage and Conrad’s not being able to open up to her and his reckless behavior, she breaks up with him. It is clear from the pilot the two still very much have feelings for each other. She tries to move on with Dr. Jude Silva, a trauma surgeon at Chastain and Conrad’s old Marines buddy, but it doesn’t work out due to her feelings for Conrad. By the end of season 1, she and Conrad get back together. In season 4, she and Conrad get married and later discover that she is pregnant. Not long after finding out she is pregnant, Nic gets attacked by a patient and nearly dies, but she and the unborn child survive. Nic and Conrad have a daughter, Georgiana Grace "Gigi" Hawkins, at the end of season 4. In season 5, Nic dies after suffering a traumatic brain injury in a car crash, leaving Conrad and Chastain devastated.

- Manish Dayal as Dr. Devon Pravesh: a first-year resident (intern) (later an attending physician) at Chastain Park Memorial Hospital. A Yale University and Harvard Medical School grad, Devon is shocked and amazed by Conrad's unconventional medical practices in the pilot, going as far as to ask for a replacement resident. Eventually, Conrad rubs off on him and Devon becomes an excellent and capable doctor.

After the time jump in season 5, Devon becomes an attending at Chastain before leaving that position to focus on running clinical trials. In the beginning of the series, he is engaged to an Indian woman named Priya, but after a brief fling with a medical pharmaceutical representative in season 2, he realizes that he doesn't want to spend the rest of his life with her and calls off the wedding. By season 5, he is in a long-term relationship with Leela Devi, whom he calls “the love of his life”. In Season 6, they become engaged.

- Shaunette Renée Wilson (seasons 1–4) as Mina Okafor: a second-year surgical resident at Chastain Park Memorial Hospital. She is very intelligent and does not care for anyone's opinion, which AJ Austin seems to find intriguing. In season 4, after losing a fight over her expiring visa, Mina decides to return to her home country of Nigeria willingly rather than be deported or continue to fight the deportation.
- Bruce Greenwood as Randolph Bell: Chief of Surgery, later CEO, and a general surgeon at Chastain Park Memorial Hospital. He leaves his CEO position on his own accord, and threatens Red Rock to try to get rid of him due to his iron clad contract. He is later demoted from Chief of Surgery in season 3 by Red Rock and starts his own talk show, Ring the Bell. In season 5, he is diagnosed with multiple sclerosis. Throughout the series, Bell is clearly attracted to Kit Voss, who becomes one of his closest friends. By Season 5, they begin to date and in Season 6, they get married.
- Merrin Dungey as Claire E. Thorpe (season 1), the original CEO of Chastain Park Memorial Hospital. She is fired by the board after Drs. Hunter and Bell accuse her of financial practices that endanger patients at Chastain. She is succeeded as CEO by Bell.
- Melina Kanakaredes as Lane Hunter (season 1; recurring season 2): a double board-certified physician in oncology and Radiation Oncology, as well as the former head of Oncology at Chastain Park Memorial Hospital. She also owned her own medical clinics. She is arrested at the end of season 1 after it's revealed that she has been giving her patients unnecessary chemotherapy in order to get paid higher premiums and had discreetly murdered a patient and framed Nic for it to cover up her crimes. She's later killed during season 2 by a vengeful husband and brother of two of her over-treated female patients after being let out on bail.
- Moran Atias as Renata Morali (season 1), the Head of Publicity at Chastain Park Memorial Hospital. She leaves the hospital alongside Claire Thorpe following the latter's firing.
- Malcolm-Jamal Warner as August Jeremiah "AJ / The Raptor" Austin (seasons 2–6; recurring season 1): a triple-board certified surgeon in Cardiothoracic, General and Trauma Surgery who joins Chastain Park Memorial Hospital at Bell's and Okafor's urging.
- Glenn Morshower as Marshall Winthrop (season 2; recurring seasons 1 & 3–5; guest season 6), a businessman and Conrad's estranged father. He becomes chairman of Chastain's board in season 2. Later he steps down to take over and reform the medical device company QuoVadis. It had been operated under false claims by its founder and CEO Gordon Page, who has died.
- Jane Leeves as Elizabeth Katherine "Kit" Voss (seasons 2–6):, the head of orthopaedic surgery, and a fiery doctor who strongly advocates for her patients. In season 4, after Chastain becomes a public hospital, she calls out the Governor of Georgia for only interviewing men for the new CEO position. Due to her leadership skills, the Governor offers Kit the CEO position. Kit remains the CEO through the end of the series, becoming one of the first CEOs to get Chastain into the black. Throughout the series, she maintains a close friendship with Dr. Bell, encouraging him become a better person. They begin dating in Season 5, and marry in Season 6.
- Morris Chestnut as Barrett Cain (seasons 3 & 4): a renowned neurosurgeon, promoted by Red Rock to Chief of Surgery after they demote Bell.

It is revealed that Cain is a former college football player who almost made it to the NFL before a career-ending injury that made him bitter. In season 4, Cain is hit by an ambulance while saving a woman's life and struggles to recover from his potentially career ending injuries while also facing a lawsuit for his actions during the COVID-19 pandemic. Cain also becomes close with Devon's sickle cell anemia patient Rose. They begin a romantic relationship with each other. In season 5, he has left Chastain for a better paying job at Johns Hopkins.

- Jessica Lucas as Billie Sutton (seasons 5 & 6; recurring season 4): a neurosurgery resident at Chastain and Nic's lifelong close friend. In season 5, she becomes the new Chief of Surgery (after the three-year time jump). In season 6, she and Conrad start dating.
- Anuja Joshi as Leela Devi (seasons 5 & 6; recurring season 4): a new surgical intern at Chastain who struggles with dyslexia while trying to prove herself in the operating room. After the time jump, she is now a resident at Chastain, living with Devon after a four-year relationship and figuring out her life with the help of her twin sister, Padma.
- Miles Fowler as Trevor Daniels (season 5), a First Year Anaesthesiology Resident and Billie's biological son, whom she gave up after birth due to being conceived from a rape when she was 13 years old. He later leaves Chastain during season 5 and takes work at a medical research company.
- Kaley Ronayne as Kincaid "Cade" Sullivan (season 6; recurring season 5), an attending Physician who is double board-certified in Critical Care and Emergency Medicine.
- Andrew McCarthy as Ian Sullivan (season 6; guest season 5), an Attending Physician and a renowned pediatric surgeon and Cade's estranged father.

=== Recurring ===
- Tasie Lawrence as Priya Nair (seasons 1 & 2), a reporter and Devon's former fiancée.
- Michael Hogan as Dr. Albert Nolan, a trauma surgery attending of Chastain Park Memorial Hospital.
- Violett Beane as Lily Elizabeth Kendall (season 1), one of Lane's chemotherapy patients.
- Warren Christie as Dr. Jude Silva (season 1), a trauma attending.
- Tasso Feldman as Dr. Irving Feldman, an ER doctor. He elopes with Jessica Moore in season 4's "Doors Opening, Doors Closing" after getting engaged to her in season 3.
- Jessica Miesel as Jessica Moore, a gossip-loving scrub nurse. She and Feldman get engaged in season 3 and then elope in season 4's "Doors Opening, Doors Closing".
- Jocko Sims as Dr. Benjamin Wilmot (season 1), an internal medicine attending.
- Patrick R. Walker as Micah Stevens (seasons 1 & 2), a science teacher at Sanford High School who is a repeat patient of Conrad's and Mina's former romantic interest.
- Steven Reddington as Dr. Bradley James Jenkins (seasons 1 & 2), a former surgical Resident at Chastain Park Memorial Hospital.
- Catherine Dyer as Alexis Stevens, a Nursing Supervisor at Chastain Park Memorial Hospital.
- Vince Foster as Dr. Paul Chu, the Chief of Anaesthesiology at Chastain Park Memorial Hospital.
- Denitra Isler as Nurse Ellen Hundley, the head ER nurse at Chastain Park Memorial Hospital.
- Michael Weston as Gordon Page (season 2), founder and former CEO of Quovadis.
- Jenna Dewan as Julian Booth (season 2), former medical device representative for Quovadis.
- Julianna Guill as Jessie Nevin (seasons 1 & 2), special guest season 3): Nic's sister.
- Daniella Alonso as Zoey Barnett (season 2), a mother to two of Conrad and Nic's patients.
- Evan Whitten as Henry Barnett (season 2), Zoey's oldest son.
- Miles Gaston Villanueva as Dr. Alec Shaw (season 2), a Family Medicine & Infectious Disease Physician at Chastain Park Memorial.
- Corbin Bernsen as Kyle Nevin (seasons 2–6), Nic and Jessie's father.
- Christopher B. Duncan as Brett Slater (season 2), Kit's ex-husband and father of her children.
- Radek Lord as Grayson Betournay (seasons 2 & 3), Bell's assistant.
- Mike Pniewski as Dr. Abe Benedict (season 2), AJ's mentor and an esteemed cardiothoracic surgeon.
- Kearran Giovanni as Andrea Braydon (season 3): A fitness teacher looking for investors for her fitness supplement. She and AJ Austin date during season 3, but they break up early in season 4.
- Geoffrey Cantor as Zip Betournay (season 3), Grayson's father and investor in Andrea's fitness supplement.
- Michael Paul Chan as Yee Austin (seasons 3 & 4), AJ's adoptive father. In season 5, he's mentioned to have died.
- Erinn Westbrook as Adaku Eze (special guest season 2, recurring season 3), Mina's friend.
- David Alan Grier as Lamar Broome (season 3), AJ's biological father.
- Denise Dowse (season 3) and Summer Selby (seasons 4 & 5) as Carol Austin, AJ's adoptive mother. In season 4, she developed terminal lung cancer, and died in season 5.
- Adriane Lenox as Dr. Bonnie Broome (season 3), AJ's biological mother.
- Rob Yang as Logan Kim (seasons 3 & 4), VP of Red Rock Mountain Medical and former CEO of Chastain; he is fired in the second episode of season 4.
- Shazi Raja as Nadine Suheimat (seasons 3 & 4), Devon's VIP patient and later love interest.
- Matt Battaglia as Bill Landry (season 3), The owner of Georgia FC and later a patient at Chastain who hires Conrad as his team doctor for saving one of his players' lives.
- Conrad Ricamora as Jake Wong (seasons 4–6), a plastic surgeon, amateur musician and Bell's former step-son who accepts a job at Chastain. In season 5, he has left the hospital, but he remains in Bell's life.
- Nichelle Hines as Nichelle Randall (season 4), A Congresswoman and a patient at Chastain who later becomes the Governor of Georgia and is instrumental in saving Chastain from closing.
- Cara Ricketts as Rose Williams (season 4), A dance teacher with sickle cell anemia and a patient of Devon's. While in physical therapy, she befriends Barrett Cain who is inspired by her no-nonsense attitude and refusal to give up in the face of tremendous odds but he resists forming a romantic relationship after the traumatic death of his ex-girlfriend on Cain's operating table. Rose undergoes an experimental gene therapy developed by an old friend of Devon's in an effort to cure her condition. The gene therapy ultimately proves to be successful. Rose is cured and starts a relationship with Cain.
- Stephen Wallem as Winston Robards (season 5)
- Aneesha Joshi as Padma Devi (seasons 5 & 6), Leela's free- spirited twin sister, who shakes things up in Leela's life when she comes to visit. A survivor of leukemia, she became infertile because of chemo. She wants to live in the present and becomes a Wellness coach. Her sister is a resident in surgery.
- Remington Blaire Evans as Gigi Hawkins (seasons 5 & 6), Conrad and Nic's daughter.
- Steven Culp as Governor Mark Betz (season 6), the newly elected governor who is set on slashing Chastain Park's budget to the point of closure but becomes a patient at Chastain after a helicopter crash.
- Landon Ashworth as Donald Killian (season 6), a new scrub tech blackmailed by Gov. Betz to find dirt on Dr. Bell after being exposed by him during a press conference.
- Ian Anthony Dale as Dr. James Yamada (season 6), an interventional cardiologist who becomes a love interest for Billie.

== Episodes ==
Season	Episodes	Originally released	
Season	Episodes	First released	Last released
1	14	January 21, 2018	May 14, 2018
2	23	September 24, 2018	May 6, 2019
3	20	September 24, 2019	April 7, 2020
4	14	January 12, 2021	May 18, 2021
5	23	September 21, 2021	May 17, 2022
6	13	September 20, 2022	January 17, 2023

== Production ==
=== Development ===
In August 2016, it was announced that Showtime was developing a new original series, known as The City, pitched by executive producer Antoine Fuqua. The series was described at the time as "a dark medical drama [that] centers around an idealistic young doctor who begins his first day of residency under the supervision of a senior resident who appears tough and brilliant, but turns out to be a cunning and deadly psychopath." It was also announced that Amy Holden Jones would produce the series and co-write the pilot episode along with Hayley Schore and Roshan Sethi. The series, however, was never produced.

On January 20, 2017, it was reported that Fox purchased the series from Showtime and ordered a pilot episode under the name The Resident. On May 10, 2017, the series received a season order of 14 episodes. The series premiered on January 21, 2018. Phillip Noyce, an executive producer for the series, directed the first two episodes of the season after signing a multi-year deal with 20th Century Fox Television. The first season officially concluded on May 14, 2018.

In May 2018, Fox renewed the series for a 13-episode second season and pre-production began on June 8, 2018. The second season premiered on September 24, 2018. On October 10, 2018, it was reported that Fox had ordered an additional nine episodes for the second season, bringing the total episode count to 22. On March 13, 2019, however, series co-creator Amy Holden Jones stated on her Twitter and Instagram accounts that there were 23 episodes in season 2. In March 2019, Fox renewed the series for a third season, which premiered on September 24, 2019. The season was originally planned to have 23 episodes, but COVID-related production shutdowns resulted in three episodes remaining unfilmed. As a result, episode 20 served as a makeshift third-season finale. In May 2020, Fox renewed series for a fourth season, which premiered on January 12, 2021. In May 2021, Fox renewed series for a fifth season, which premiered on September 21, 2021. In May 2022, Fox renewed series for a sixth season which premiered on September 20, 2022. On April 6, 2023, Fox canceled the series after six seasons.

=== Casting ===
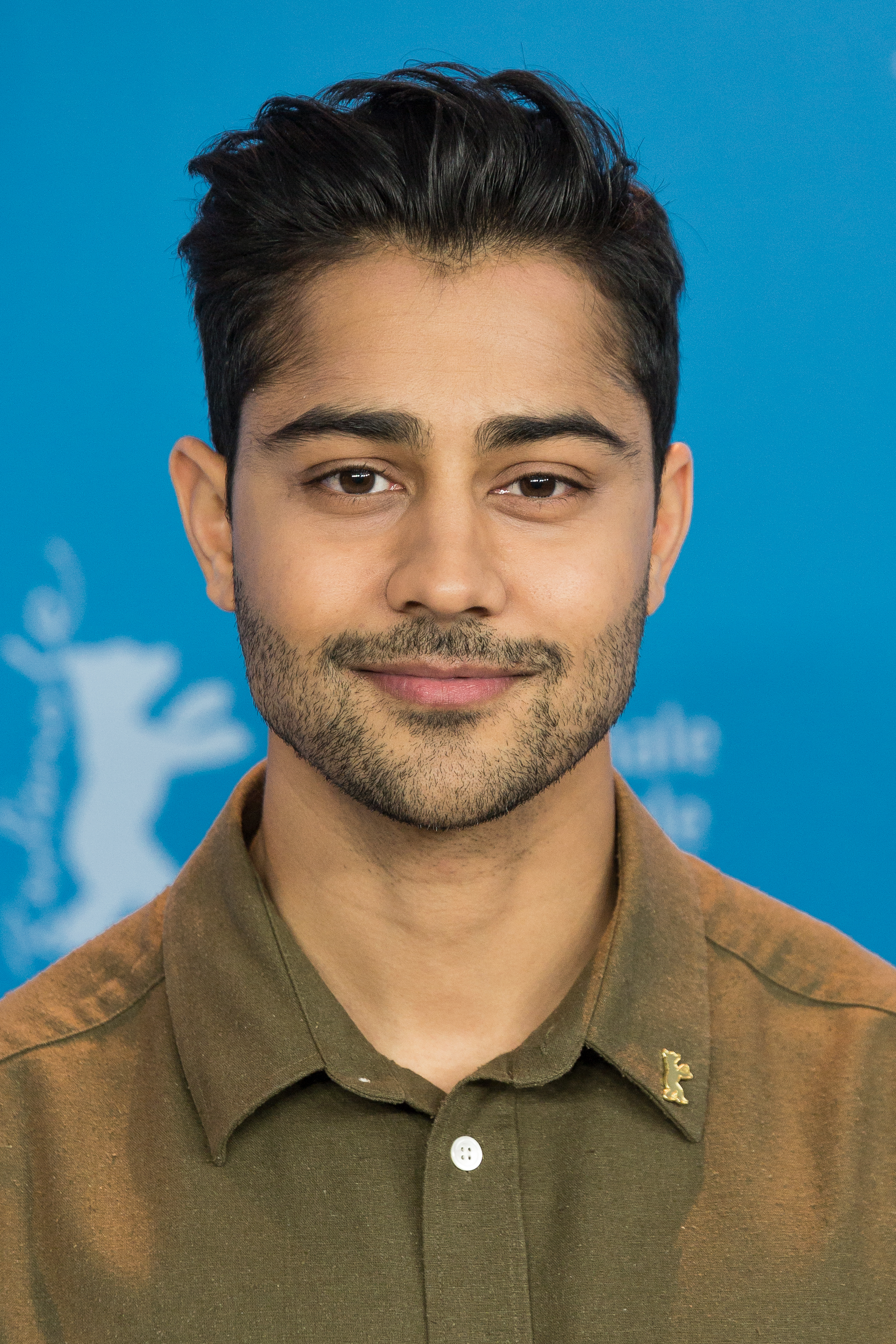
Manish Dayal

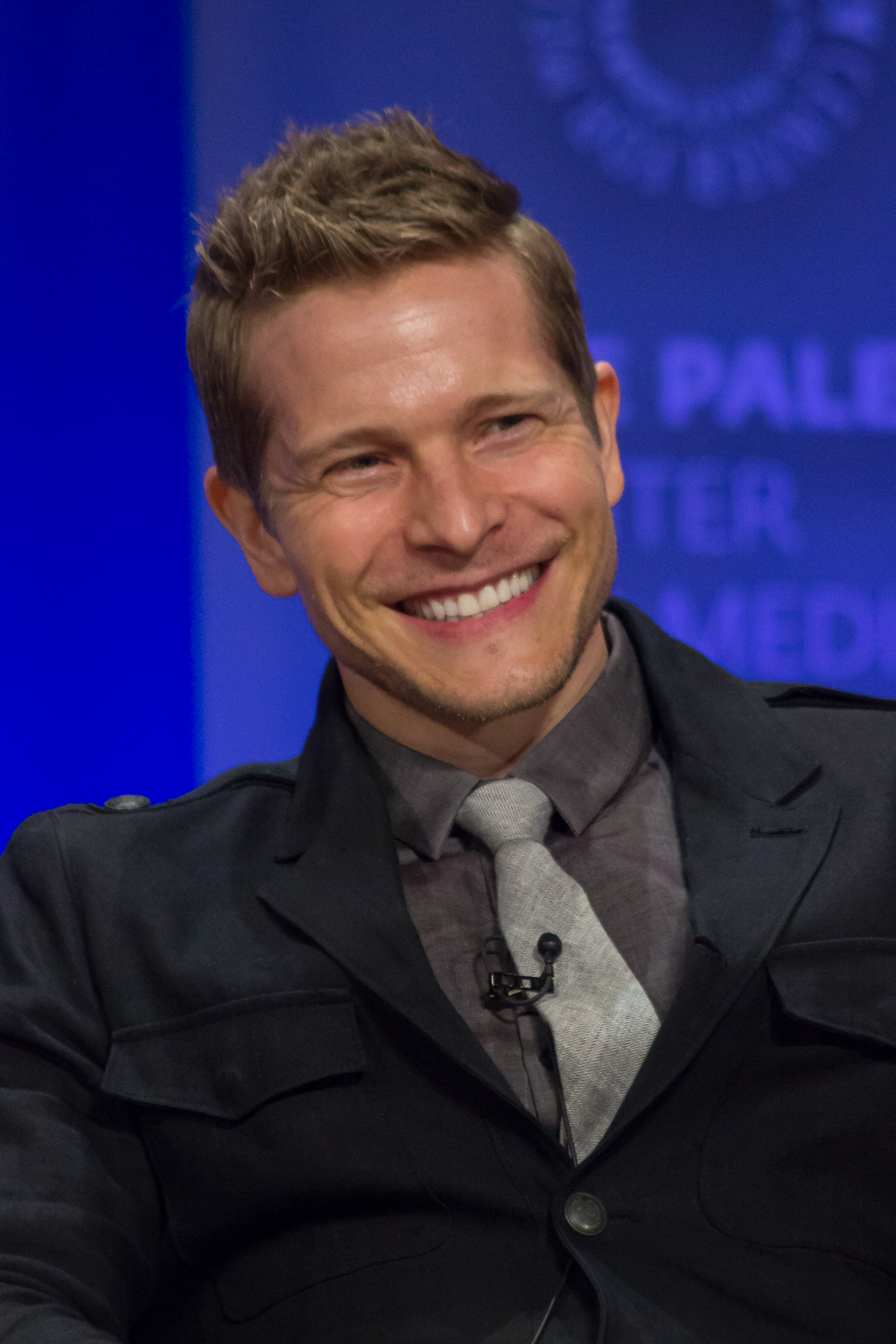
Matt Czuchry

Two of the first cast members to be announced

On February 21, 2017, Manish Dayal and Bruce Greenwood were the first to be cast in the series for the roles of Devon Pravesh and Soloman Bell, respectively. Greenwood's character name was later changed to Randolph Bell. Matt Czuchry, Emily VanCamp, Shaunette Renée Wilson and Melina Kanakaredes were later announced to be starring in the series as well. Moran Atias was also cast for the role of Renta Thorpe, CEO at Chastain Park, which was originally portrayed by Valerie Cruz in the pilot. However, when Merrin Dungey joined the cast, the producers saw Atias as a better fit for the role of the hospital's head of marketing. Dungey replaced her as the CEO and the character's name was changed to Claire Thorpe.

As the season developed, it was announced that Violett Beane was set to recur, and on April 30, 2018, Malcolm-Jamal Warner was reported to have a major recurring role in the final three episodes of the season.

On June 18, 2018, it was announced that Warner and other recurring cast member, Glenn Morshower would be promoted to series regulars for the second season. The following day, it was announced that Moran Atias, Merrin Dungey and Melina Kanakaredes would not be returning, and that Jane Leeves would also be joining the cast as a regular for the second season on a one-year contract.

On July 16, 2018, it was announced that Jenna Dewan is set to recur on season 2. It was later announced on August 27 that Daniella Alonso had also been cast in a recurring role for the second season. On October 15, 2020, Conrad Ricamora was cast in a recurring role for the fourth season. On December 18, 2020, Jessica Lucas joined the cast as a new series regular for the fourth season.

On April 21, 2021, it was announced that original cast member Shaunette Renée Wilson would be written out of the series towards the end of the fourth season, after her deciding to exit the series to explore new ventures. She was followed by Emily VanCamp, whose character was written out of the series in the third episode of the fifth season.

On June 4, 2021, Anuja Joshi was promoted to a series regular for the fifth season. On August 24, 2021, Stephen Wallem joined the cast in a recurring role for the fifth season. On September 15, 2021, Miles Fowler joined the cast as a new series regular for the fifth season, followed by Kaley Ronayne on October 19, 2021. On April 6, 2022, it was reported that Fowler exited the series after less than one season as a series regular. On July 11, 2022, it was announced that Andrew McCarthy was promoted to series regular for the sixth season, followed by Ronayne on July 14, 2022.

=== Filming ===
Primary photography for the series takes place in and around Atlanta, Georgia. Some filming took place on location in Canton, Georgia, at the Blankets Creek Bike Trail. Exterior and some interior shots of the High Museum of Art in midtown-Atlanta were used as the backdrop for the fictional Chastain Park Memorial Hospital. Some filming also took place in Conyers, Georgia, on a production set previously used for Fox's Sleepy Hollow. Filming for the first production block took place between March 20 and April 5, 2017. Filming on the second season began in July 2018. On March 14, 2020, production on the third season was suspended upon the outbreak of the COVID-19 pandemic.

== Broadcast, streaming, and home video release ==
In the United States, episodes were broadcast by Fox. Internationally, the series airs on Seven Network then later on Disney + in Australia, City (season 1) and CTV (season 2–present) in Canada, on Universal TV (season 1 and 2), Sky Witness (season 3) and Disney+ (season 4-present) in the United Kingdom and Ireland and on Star World in the Indian Subcontinent. In Latin America, the series is broadcast by Fox's Latin America counterpart. Episodes can be watched next day on the network's website. Hulu owns the SVOD rights to the series, and individual episodes, or the season as a whole, are available for purchase on Amazon and iTunes. The first season DVD set was made available for pre-order in June 2018 through Amazon and was released on October 2, 2018.

Season	Episodes	DVD release dates				Blu-ray release dates			
Season	Episodes	Region 1	Region 2	Region 4	Discs	Region A/1	Region B/2	Region C/3	Discs
1	14	October 2, 2018	TBA	December 5, 2018	3	TBA	TBA	—N/a	TBA
2	23	September 3, 2019	TBA	—N/a	5	TBA	TBA	—N/a	TBA
3	20	August 4, 2020	TBA	—N/a	4	TBA	TBA	—N/a	TBA

== Reception ==
=== Ratings ===
Viewership and ratings per season of The Resident
Season	Timeslot (ET)	Episodes	First aired		Last aired		TV season	Viewership rank	Avg. viewers (millions)	18–49 rank	Avg. 18–49 rating
Season	Timeslot (ET)	Episodes	Date	Viewers (millions)	Date	Viewers (millions)	TV season	Viewership rank	Avg. viewers (millions)	18–49 rank	Avg. 18–49 rating
1	Monday 9:00 pm	14	January 21, 2018	8.65	May 14, 2018	4.29	2017–18	59	7.03	41	1.7
2	Monday 8:00 pm	23	September 24, 2018	4.88	May 6, 2019	5.01	2018–19	50	7.63	40	1.5
3	Tuesday 8:00 pm	20	September 24, 2019	4.05	April 7, 2020	5.09	2019–20	53	6.70	33	1.3
4	Tuesday 8:00 pm	14	January 12, 2021	3.92	May 18, 2021	3.05	2020–21	48	5.64	34	1.0
5	Tuesday 8:00 pm	23	September 21, 2021	3.03	May 17, 2022	2.90	2021–22	49	4.93	45	0.7
6	Tuesday 8:00 pm	13	September 20, 2022	2.71	January 17, 2023	2.98	2022–23	51	4.40	62	0.5

=== Critical response ===
The review aggregator website Rotten Tomatoes reported an approval rating of 59% based on 22 reviews for the show's first season, with an average rating of 6.10/10. The site’s consensus reads: “With sporadic amusement and a handful of decent performances, The Resident drifts between medical melodrama and hospital horror with often unintentionally funny results.”. On Metacritic, the season has a weighted average score of 54 out of 100 based on reviews from 12 critics, indicating "mixed or average reviews".

USA Today rated the series 1.5 out of 4 stars stating "It's a shame, because it's a waste of the talents of Czuchry and VanCamp (Revenge), two usually appealing TV veterans" and "The Resident can't save itself". Meanwhile, TVLine rated the series a B+ and said: "The Resident takes a hard look at the thorny ethical issues surrounding today's health-care providers." The first season was also often compared to ABC's medical drama, The Good Doctor. The series was unpopular with some in the medical profession, with various sources calling it grossly unrealistic.

=== Awards and nominations ===
Year	Award	Category	Nominee	Result	Ref.
2018	Teen Choice Awards	Choice Breakout TV Show	The Resident	Nominated	
2019	Teen Choice Awards	Choice Drama TV Show	The Resident	Nominated	
2019	Young Artist Awards	Guest Starring Young Actor	Evan Whitten	Nominated	
