= List of DreamWorks Pictures films =

This is a list of feature films released, produced, and/or distributed by DreamWorks Pictures. Distribution rights to 1997-2011 DreamWorks Pictures films are owned by Paramount Pictures unless mentioned otherwise while distribution rights to 2011-2016 DreamWorks Pictures films are owned by The Walt Disney Company and distribution rights to 1998-2005 DreamWorks Animation films are owned by Universal Pictures following Comcast's (through NBCUniversal's) acquisition of DreamWorks Animation in 2016.

== 1990s ==
Release date	Title	Co-production with	Distributor	Notes
September 26, 1997	The Peacemaker	Parkes/MacDonald Productions	DreamWorks Distribution (United States and Canada); CJ Entertainment (China, Hong Kong and Korea); United International Pictures (International)	first film to be produced by DreamWorks Pictures first DreamWorks Pictures film to be distributed by DreamWorks Distribution
December 10, 1997	Amistad	HBO Pictures and Amblin Entertainment	DreamWorks Distribution (United States and Canada); CJ Entertainment (China, Hong Kong and Korea); United International Pictures (International)	Nominated - Critics' Choice Movie Award for Best Picture; Nominated - David di Donatello for Best Foreign Film; Nominated - Golden Globe Award for Best Motion Picture – Drama; Nominated - Satellite Award for Best Film
December 19, 1997	Mouse Hunt	Riche/Ludwig Productions	DreamWorks Distribution (United States and Canada); CJ Entertainment (China, Hong Kong and Korea); United International Pictures (International)	Nominated - Saturn Award for Best Fantasy Film
April 17, 1998	Paulie	Mutual Film Company	DreamWorks Distribution (United States and Canada); CJ Entertainment (China, Hong Kong and Korea); Gaga Communications (Japan); United International Pictures (International)	
May 8, 1998	Deep Impact	Paramount Pictures, Amblin Entertainment, The Manhattan Project and Zanuck/Brown Productions	Paramount Pictures (United States and Canada); CJ Entertainment (China, Hong Kong and Korea); DreamWorks Distribution (International; through United International Pictures)	
July 10, 1998	Small Soldiers	Universal Pictures and Amblin Entertainment	DreamWorks Distribution (United States and Canada); Universal Pictures (International; through United International Pictures)	
July 24, 1998	Saving Private Ryan	Paramount Pictures, Amblin Entertainment and Mutual Film Company	DreamWorks Distribution (United States and Canada); Paramount Pictures (International; through United International Pictures)	BAFTA Award for Best Film; Critics' Choice Movie Award for Best Picture; Golden Globe Award for Best Motion Picture – Drama; Saturn Award for Best Action/Adventure/Thriller Film; Nominated - Academy Award for Best Picture; Nominated - César Award for Best Foreign Film; Nominated - Satellite Award for Best Film - Drama; Nominated - Japan Academy Film Prize for Outstanding Foreign Language Film; Inducted into the National Film Registry in 2014
October 2, 1998	Antz	DreamWorks Animation and Pacific Data Images	DreamWorks Distribution (United States and Canada); CJ Entertainment (China, Hong Kong and Korea); United International Pictures (International)	first film to be produced by DreamWorks Animation first DreamWorks Pictures film to be computer-animated first DreamWorks Animation film to be computer-animated first DreamWorks Animation film to be produced by DreamWorks Pictures and distributed by DreamWorks Distribution; Nominated - Satellite Award for Best Animated or Mixed Media Feature
December 18, 1998	The Prince of Egypt	DreamWorks Animation	DreamWorks Distribution (United States and Canada); CJ Entertainment (China, Hong Kong and Korea); United International Pictures (International)	first DreamWorks Pictures film to be traditionally-animated first DreamWorks Animation film to be traditionally-animated Nominated - Annie Award for Best Animated Feature; Nominated - Saturn Award for Best Action/Adventure/Thriller Film
January 15, 1999	In Dreams	Amblin Entertainment	DreamWorks Distribution (United States and Canada); CJ Entertainment (China, Hong Kong and Korea); United International Pictures (International)	
March 19, 1999	Forces of Nature	Roth-Arnold Productions	DreamWorks Distribution (United States and Canada); CJ Entertainment (China, Hong Kong and Korea); United International Pictures (International)	
May 21, 1999	The Love Letter	Sanford/Pillsbury Productions	DreamWorks Distribution (United States and Canada); CJ Entertainment (China, Hong Kong and Korea); United International Pictures (International)	
July 23, 1999	The Haunting	Roth-Arnold Productions	DreamWorks Distribution (United States and Canada); CJ Entertainment (China, Hong Kong and Korea); United International Pictures (International)	
October 1, 1999	American Beauty	The Jinks/Cohen Company	DreamWorks Distribution (United States and Canada); CJ Entertainment (China, Hong Kong and Korea); United International Pictures (International)	Academy Award for Best Picture; BAFTA Award for Best Film; Bodil Award for Best American Film; Critics' Choice Movie Award for Best Picture; Golden Globe Award for Best Motion Picture – Drama; National Board of Review Award for Best Film; Toronto International Film Festival People's Choice Award; Nominated - César Award for Best Foreign Film; Nominated - David di Donatello for Best Foreign Film; Nominated - Japan Academy Film Prize for Outstanding Foreign Language Film; Nominated - Satellite Award for Best Film - Drama
December 25, 1999	Galaxy Quest	Gran Via Productions	DreamWorks Distribution (United States and Canada); CJ Entertainment (China, Hong Kong and Korea); United International Pictures (International)	Nominated - Saturn Award for Best Science Fiction Film

== 2000s ==
Release date	Title	Co-production with	Distributor	Notes
March 31, 2000	The Road to El Dorado	DreamWorks Animation	DreamWorks Distribution (United States and Canada); CJ Entertainment (China, Hong Kong, Japan and Korea); Toshiba Entertainment, CineQuanon and Amuse Pictures (Japan); United International Pictures (International)	Nominated - Annie Award for Best Animated Feature
May 5, 2000	Gladiator	Universal Pictures, Scott Free Productions and Red Wagon Entertainment	DreamWorks Distribution (United States, Canada and Korea); CJ Entertainment (Korea); Universal Pictures (International; through United International Pictures)	Academy Award for Best Picture; BAFTA Award for Best Film; Critics' Choice Movie Award for Best Picture; Golden Globe Award for Best Motion Picture – Drama; Nominated - Japan Academy Film Prize for Outstanding Foreign Language Film; Nominated - Satellite Award for Best Film - Drama; Nominated - Saturn Award for Best Action/Adventure/Thriller Film
May 19, 2000	Road Trip	The Montecito Picture Company	DreamWorks Distribution (United States and Canada); CJ Entertainment (China, Hong Kong and Korea); United International Pictures (International)	
May 19, 2000	Small Time Crooks (Note: Owned by WestEnd Films, with U.S. distribution handled by Quiver Distribution)	Sweetland Films	DreamWorks Distribution	North American distribution only
June 23, 2000	Chicken Run	DreamWorks Animation, Pathé, Allied Filmmakers and Aardman Animations	DreamWorks Distribution (United States and Canada); Pathé and StudioCanal (U.K., Ireland, France, Germany, Austria, Switzerland, Spain and the Benelux); Tobis StudioCanal (Germany and Austria); Warner Sogefilms (Spain); A-Film/Cinéart (Benelux); CJ Entertainment (China, Hong Kong, Japan and Korea); Toshiba Entertainment, CineQuanon and Amuse Pictures (Japan); United International Pictures (International)	first DreamWorks Pictures film to be stop-motion animated first DreamWorks Animation film to be stop-motion animated Critics' Choice Movie Award for Best Animated Feature; National Board of Review Award for Best Animated Film; Satellite Award for Best Animated or Mixed Media Feature; Nominated - Annie Award for Best Animated Feature; Nominated - BAFTA Award for Outstanding British Film; Nominated - Bodil Award for Best Non-American Film; Nominated - European Film Award for Best Film; Nominated - Golden Globe Award for Best Motion Picture – Musical or Comedy; Nominated - Goya Award for Best European Film; Nominated - Saturn Award for Best Fantasy Film
July 21, 2000	What Lies Beneath	20th Century Fox and ImageMovers	DreamWorks Distribution (United States and Canada); 20th Century Fox (International)	
September 15, 2000	Almost Famous	Columbia Pictures and Vinyl Films	DreamWorks Distribution (United States and Canada); Columbia Pictures (International; through Columbia TriStar Film Distributors International)	Golden Globe Award for Best Motion Picture – Musical or Comedy; Nominated - BAFTA Award for Best Film; Nominated - Critics' Choice Movie Award for Best Picture; Nominated - Satellite Award for Best Film - Musical or Comedy
October 6, 2000	Meet the Parents	Universal Pictures, Nancy Tenenbaum Productions and Tribeca Productions	Universal Pictures (United States and Canada); CJ Entertainment (China, Hong Kong and Korea); DreamWorks Distribution (International; through United International Pictures)	
October 13, 2000	The Contender (Note: Distribution rights currently owned by Giant Pictures, although DreamWorks retains its credits as presenter and copyright holder)	Cinerenta, Cinecontender Productions, Battleground Productions and SE8 Group	DreamWorks Distribution	North American distribution only
November 3, 2000	The Legend of Bagger Vance	20th Century Fox, Wildwood Enterprises and Allied Filmmakers	DreamWorks Distribution (United States and Canada); Icon Entertainment International (Eastern Europe, Greece, Cyprus, Switzerland, Scandinavia, Turkey, the Benelux, the CIS and Portugal); 20th Century Fox (International)	
November 7, 2000	Joseph: King of Dreams	DreamWorks Animation	DreamWorks Home Entertainment	direct-to-video film
December 22, 2000	Cast Away	20th Century Fox, ImageMovers and Playtone	20th Century Fox (United States and Canada); CJ Entertainment (China, Hong Kong and Korea); DreamWorks Distribution (International; through United International Pictures)	Nominated - Critics' Choice Movie Award for Best Picture
December 25, 2000	An Everlasting Piece	Columbia Pictures, Bayahibe Films and Baltimore Spring/Creek Pictures	DreamWorks Distribution (United States and Canada); Columbia Pictures (International; through Columbia TriStar Film Distributors International)	
March 2, 2001	The Mexican	Newmarket and Lawrence Bender Productions	DreamWorks Distribution (United States and Canada); Summit Entertainment (Germany, Austria, Spain and Japan); Buena Vista International and Helkon Filmverleih (Germany and Austria); Tripictures (Spain); GAGA-Humax (Japan); CJ Entertainment (China, Hong Kong and Korea); United International Pictures (International)	GLAAD Media Award for Outstanding Film - Wide Release
May 18, 2001	Shrek	DreamWorks Animation and Pacific Data Images	DreamWorks Distribution (United States and Canada); CJ Entertainment (China, Hong Kong and Korea); United International Pictures (International)	Inaugural winner of the Academy Award for Best Animated Feature; Annie Award for Best Animated Feature; Critics' Choice Movie Award for Best Animated Feature; National Board of Review Award for Best Animated Film; Nominated - BAFTA Award for Best Film; Nominated - Bodil Award for Best American Film; Nominated - Critics' Choice Movie Award for Best Picture; Nominated - Golden Globe Award for Best Motion Picture – Musical or Comedy; Nominated - Palme d'Or; Nominated - Satellite Award for Best Animated or Mixed Media Feature; Nominated - Saturn Award for Best Fantasy Film; Inducted into the National Film Registry in 2020
June 8, 2001	Evolution	Columbia Pictures and The Montecito Picture Company	DreamWorks Distribution (United States and Canada); Columbia Pictures (International; through Columbia TriStar Film Distributors International)	
June 29, 2001	A.I. Artificial Intelligence	Warner Bros. Pictures, Stanley Kubrick Productions and Amblin Entertainment	Warner Bros. Pictures (Worldwide theatrical and international home media); DreamWorks Distribution (Worldwide television and streaming and North American home media)	Saturn Award for Best Science Fiction Film; Nominated - Japan Academy Film Prize for Outstanding Foreign Language Film
August 24, 2001	The Curse of the Jade Scorpion	VCL Communications and Gravier Productions	DreamWorks Distribution	North American distribution only
October 19, 2001	The Last Castle	Robert Lawrence Productions	DreamWorks Distribution (United States and Canada); CJ Entertainment (China, Hong Kong and Korea); United International Pictures (International)	
December 21, 2001	A Beautiful Mind	Universal Pictures and Imagine Entertainment	Universal Pictures (United States and Canada); CJ Entertainment (China, Hong Kong and Korea); DreamWorks Distribution (International; through United International Pictures)	Academy Award for Best Picture; Critics' Choice Movie Award for Best Picture; Golden Globe Award for Best Motion Picture – Drama; Nominated - BAFTA Award for Best Film
March 8, 2002	The Time Machine	Warner Bros. Pictures and Parkes/MacDonald Productions	DreamWorks Distribution (United States and Canada); Warner Bros. Pictures (International)	
May 3, 2002	Hollywood Ending	Gravier Productions	DreamWorks Distribution	North American distribution only
May 24, 2002	Spirit: Stallion of the Cimarron	DreamWorks Animation	DreamWorks Distribution (United States and Canada); CJ Entertainment (China, Hong Kong and Korea); United International Pictures (International)	Nominated - Academy Award for Best Animated Feature; Nominated - Annie Award for Best Animated Feature; Nominated - Critics' Choice Movie Award for Best Animated Feature; Nominated - Satellite Award for Best Animated or Mixed Media Feature
June 21, 2002	Minority Report	20th Century Fox, Cruise/Wagner Productions, Blue Tulip Productions and Amblin Entertainment	20th Century Fox (Worldwide theatrical and international home media); DreamWorks Distribution (Worldwide television and streaming and North American home media)	Saturn Award for Best Science Fiction Film; Nominated - César Award for Best Foreign Film
July 12, 2002	Road to Perdition	20th Century Fox and The Zanuck Company	DreamWorks Distribution (United States and Canada); 20th Century Fox (International)	Saturn Award for Best Action/Adventure/Thriller Film; Nominated - Critics' Choice Movie Award for Best Picture; Nominated - Golden Lion; Nominated - Satellite Award for Best Film - Drama
September 27, 2002	The Tuxedo	Blue Train Productions, Vanguard Films and Parkes/MacDonald Productions	DreamWorks Distribution (United States and Canada); CJ Entertainment (China, Hong Kong and Korea); United International Pictures (International)	
October 18, 2002	The Ring	Parkes/MacDonald Productions, Vertigo Entertainment and BenderSpink, Inc.	DreamWorks Distribution (United States and Canada); CJ Entertainment (China, Hong Kong and Korea); Asmik Ace (Japan); United International Pictures (International)	Saturn Award for Best Horror Film
December 25, 2002	Catch Me If You Can	Amblin Entertainment, Kemp Company, Splendid Pictures and Parkes/MacDonald Productions	DreamWorks Distribution (United States and Canada); CJ Entertainment (China, Hong Kong and Korea); United International Pictures (International)	Nominated - Critics' Choice Movie Award for Best Picture
January 31, 2003	Biker Boyz	3 Arts Entertainment	DreamWorks Distribution (United States and Canada); CJ Entertainment (China, Hong Kong and Korea); United International Pictures (International)	
February 21, 2003	Old School	The Montecito Picture Company	DreamWorks Distribution (United States and Canada); CJ Entertainment (China, Hong Kong and Korea); United International Pictures (International)	
March 28, 2003	Head of State	3 Arts Entertainment	DreamWorks Distribution (United States and Canada); CJ Entertainment (China, Hong Kong and Korea); United International Pictures (International)	
July 2, 2003	Sinbad: Legend of the Seven Seas	DreamWorks Animation	DreamWorks Distribution (United States and Canada); CJ Entertainment (China, Hong Kong and Korea); United International Pictures (International)	last DreamWorks Pictures film to be traditionally-animated last DreamWorks Animation film to be traditionally-animated Nominated - Satellite Award for Best Animated or Mixed Media Feature; Nominated - Saturn Award for Best Animated Film
July 25, 2003	Seabiscuit	Universal Pictures, Spyglass Entertainment, Larger Than Life Productions and The Kennedy/Marshall Company	Universal Pictures (United States and Canada); DreamWorks Distribution (Germany, Austria, Switzerland, Spain and Scandinavia; through United International Pictures); Forum Film (Poland and Israel); Intercom (Hungary); ZON Lusomundo (Portugal); Village Films (Greece and Cyprus); Myndform (Iceland); Ster-Kinekor (South Africa); Paradise Group (CIS and Baltics); United International Pictures (Japan); Buena Vista International (International)	Nominated - Academy Award for Best Picture; Nominated - Critics' Choice Movie Award for Best Picture; Nominated - Golden Globe Award for Best Motion Picture – Drama; Nominated - Japan Academy Film Prize for Outstanding Foreign Language Film
August 12, 2003	Walk the Talk	Good Machine Productions	DreamWorks Distribution	released direct-to-video in the United States international rights licensed to Good Machine International
September 19, 2003	Anything Else	Periodo Productions and Gravier Productions	DreamWorks Distribution	North American distribution only
November 21, 2003	The Cat in the Hat	Universal Pictures and Imagine Entertainment	Universal Pictures (United States and Canada); CJ Entertainment (China, Hong Kong and Korea); DreamWorks Distribution (International; through United International Pictures)	
December 19, 2003	House of Sand and Fog	Bisgrove Entertainment and Cobalt Media Group	DreamWorks Distribution	North American distribution only
December 25, 2003	Paycheck	Paramount Pictures, Davis Entertainment and Lion Rock Productions	Paramount Pictures (United States and Canada); CJ Entertainment (China, Hong Kong and Korea); DreamWorks Distribution (International; through United International Pictures)	Nominated - Saturn Award for Best Science Fiction Film
January 23, 2004	Win a Date with Tad Hamilton!	Red Wagon Entertainment	DreamWorks Distribution (United States and Canada); CJ Entertainment (China, Hong Kong and Korea); United International Pictures (International)	
February 20, 2004	EuroTrip	The Montecito Picture Company	DreamWorks Distribution (United States and Canada); CJ Entertainment (China, Hong Kong and Korea); Central Partnership (CIS); ACME Film (Baltics); United International Pictures (International)	
April 30, 2004	Envy	Columbia Pictures, Castle Rock Entertainment and Baltimore/Spring Creek Pictures	DreamWorks Distribution (United States and Canada); Columbia Pictures (International; through Columbia TriStar Film Distributors International)	
May 19, 2004	Shrek 2	DreamWorks Animation and Pacific Data Images	DreamWorks Distribution (United States and Canada); CJ Entertainment (China, Hong Kong and Korea); Central Partnership (CIS); ACME Film (Baltics); United International Pictures (International)	Nominated - Academy Award for Best Animated Feature; Nominated - Annie Award for Best Animated Feature; Nominated - Critics' Choice Movie Award for Best Animated Feature; Nominated - Palme d'Or; Nominated - Saturn Award for Best Animated Film
May 21, 2004	The Life and Death of Peter Sellers	HBO Films, BBC Films, DeMann Entertainment and Company Pictures	DreamWorks Distribution (United States, United Kingdom and Canada)	
June 11, 2004	The Stepford Wives	Paramount Pictures, Scott Rudin Productions and De Line Pictures	Paramount Pictures (United States and Canada); CJ Entertainment (China, Hong Kong and Korea); DreamWorks Distribution (International; through United International Pictures)	
June 18, 2004	The Terminal	Amblin Entertainment and Parkes/MacDonald Productions	DreamWorks Distribution (United States and Canada); CJ Entertainment (China, Hong Kong and Korea); United International Pictures (International)	
July 9, 2004	Anchorman: The Legend of Ron Burgundy	Apatow Productions	DreamWorks Distribution (United States and Canada); CJ Entertainment (China, Hong Kong and Korea); United International Pictures (International)	
August 6, 2004	Collateral	Paramount Pictures, Forward Pass, Edge City and Parkes/MacDonald Productions	DreamWorks Distribution (United States and Canada); Paramount Pictures (International; through United International Pictures)	Nominated - Critics' Choice Movie Award for Best Picture; Nominated - Saturn Award for Best Action/Adventure/Thriller Film
October 1, 2004	Shark Tale	DreamWorks Animation	DreamWorks Distribution (United States and Canada); CJ Entertainment (China, Hong Kong and Korea); Asmik Ace (Japan); United International Pictures (International)	Nominated - Academy Award for Best Animated Feature; Nominated - Saturn Award for Best Animated Film
October 22, 2004	Surviving Christmas	Tall Trees Productions and LivePlanet	DreamWorks Distribution (United States and Canada); CJ Entertainment (China, Hong Kong and Korea); United International Pictures (International)	
December 17, 2004	Lemony Snicket's A Series of Unfortunate Events	Paramount Pictures, Nickelodeon Movies and Parkes/MacDonald Productions	Paramount Pictures (United States and Canada); CJ Entertainment (China, Hong Kong and Korea); Asmik Ace (Japan); DreamWorks Distribution (International; through United International Pictures)	Nominated - Broadcast Film Critics Association Award for Best Family Film; Nominated - Saturn Award for Best Fantasy Film
December 22, 2004	Meet the Fockers	Universal Pictures, Tribeca Productions and Everyman Pictures	Universal Pictures (United States and Canada); CJ Entertainment (China, Hong Kong and Korea); Asmik Ace (Japan); DreamWorks Distribution (International; through United International Pictures)	
March 18, 2005	The Ring Two	Parkes/MacDonald Productions, Vertigo Entertainment and BenderSpink, Inc.	DreamWorks Distribution (United States and Canada); CJ Entertainment (China, Hong Kong and Korea); Asmik Ace (Japan); United International Pictures (International)	
May 27, 2005	Madagascar	DreamWorks Animation and Pacific Data Images	DreamWorks Distribution (United States and Canada); CJ Entertainment (China, Hong Kong and Korea); Asmik Ace (Japan); United International Pictures (International)	Nominated - Annie Award for Best Animated Feature; Nominated - Critics' Choice Movie Award for Best Animated Feature; Nominated - Saturn Award for Best Animated Film
June 29, 2005	War of the Worlds	Paramount Pictures, Cruise/Wagner Productions and Amblin Entertainment	Paramount Pictures (Worldwide theatrical and international home media); DreamWorks Distribution (Worldwide television and streaming and North American home media)	Nominated - Saturn Award for Best Science Fiction Film
July 22, 2005	The Island	Warner Bros. Pictures and Parkes/MacDonald Productions	DreamWorks Distribution (United States and Canada); Warner Bros. Pictures (International)	
August 19, 2005	Red Eye	BenderSpink, Inc. and Craven-Maddalena Films	DreamWorks Distribution (United States and Canada); CJ Entertainment (China, Hong Kong and Korea); United International Pictures (International)	Nominated - Saturn Award for Best Action/Adventure/Thriller Film
September 16, 2005	Just Like Heaven	Parkes/MacDonald Productions	DreamWorks Distribution (United States and Canada); CJ Entertainment (China, Hong Kong and Korea); United International Pictures (International)	
October 7, 2005	Wallace & Gromit: The Curse of the Were-Rabbit	DreamWorks Animation and Aardman Animations	DreamWorks Distribution (United States and Canada); CJ Entertainment (China, Hong Kong and Korea); Asmik Ace (Japan); United International Pictures (International)	last DreamWorks Pictures film to be stop-motion animated last DreamWorks Animation film to be stop-motion animated last DreamWorks Animation film to be produced by DreamWorks Pictures and distributed by DreamWorks Distribution; Academy Award for Best Animated Feature; Annie Award for Best Animated Feature; BAFTA Award for Outstanding British Film; Critics' Choice Movie Award for Best Animated Feature; Nominated - Bodil Award for Best Non-American Film; Nominated - European Film Award for Best Film; Nominated - Satellite Award for Best Animated or Mixed Media Feature; Nominated - Saturn Award for Best Animated Film
October 21, 2005	Dreamer	Hyde Park Entertainment, Epsilon Motion Pictures and Tollin/Robbins Productions	DreamWorks Distribution	North American distribution only
December 9, 2005	Memoirs of a Geisha	Columbia Pictures, Spyglass Entertainment, Amblin Entertainment and Red Wagon Entertainment	Columbia Pictures (North and Latin America, Spain, the Benelux, Scandinavia, the Czech Republic, Slovakia, Bulgaria, former Yugoslavia, the Middle East, Turkey and Asia excluding Japan; through Sony Pictures Releasing); Roadshow Entertainment (Australia, New Zealand, Greece and Cyprus); Buena Vista International (U.K., Ireland and Japan); Miramax Films (U.K. and Ireland); Shochiku (Japan); StudioCanal (France; through Mars Distribution); Warner Bros. Pictures (Germany, Austria and Switzerland); Eagle Pictures (Italy); ZON Lusomundo (Portugal, Angola and Mozambique); Forum Film (Poland, Hungary and Israel); Prooptiki (Romania); Myndform (Iceland); Paradise Group (CIS); ACME Film (Baltics); Ster-Kinekor (South Africa)	Nominated - Critics' Choice Movie Award for Best Picture; Nominated - Satellite Award for Best Film - Drama
December 23, 2005	Munich	Universal Pictures, Amblin Entertainment, The Kennedy/Marshall Company and Alliance Atlantis	Universal Pictures (United States and Canada); CJ Entertainment (China, Hong Kong and Korea); Asmik Ace (Japan); DreamWorks Distribution (International; through United International Pictures)	Nominated - Academy Award for Best Picture; Nominated - Critics' Choice Movie Award for Best Picture
December 28, 2005	Match Point	BBC Films, Thema Production and Jada Productions	DreamWorks Distribution	North American distribution only last DreamWorks Pictures film to be distributed by DreamWorks Distribution; David di Donatello for Best European Film; Goya Award for Best European Film; Nominated - César Award for Best Foreign Film; Nominated - Golden Globe Award for Best Motion Picture – Drama
March 17, 2006	She's the Man	Lakeshore Entertainment and The Donners' Company	Paramount Pictures	North American distribution only
September 15, 2006	The Last Kiss	Lakeshore Entertainment	Paramount Pictures	North and Hispanic American, German and Austrian distribution only
October 20, 2006	Flags of Our Fathers	Warner Bros. Pictures, Malpaso Productions and Amblin Entertainment	Paramount Pictures (United States and Canada); Warner Bros. Pictures (International)	Japan Academy Film Prize for Outstanding Foreign Language Film; Nominated - Satellite Award for Best Film - Drama
December 15, 2006	Dreamgirls	Paramount Pictures and Laurence Mark Productions	Paramount Pictures	Golden Globe Award for Best Motion Picture – Musical or Comedy; Nominated - Japan Academy Film Prize for Outstanding Foreign Language Film
December 20, 2006	Letters from Iwo Jima	Warner Bros. Pictures, Malpaso Productions and Amblin Entertainment	Warner Bros. Pictures	Bodil Award for Best American Film; Critics' Choice Movie Award for Best Foreign Language Film; Golden Globe Award for Best Foreign Language Film; Japan Academy Film Prize for Outstanding Foreign Language Film; National Board of Review Award for Best Film; Nominated - Academy Award for Best Picture; Nominated - Critics' Choice Movie Award for Best Picture; Nominated - Saturn Award for Best International Film
December 27, 2006	Perfume: The Story of a Murderer	Constantin Film, Bernd Eichinger Productions, NEF Productions and Castelao Productions	Paramount Pictures	North American distribution only Nominated - Saturn Award for Best Action/Adventure/Thriller Film
February 9, 2007	Norbit	Davis Entertainment and Tollin/Robbins Productions	Paramount Pictures	
March 30, 2007	Blades of Glory	MTV Films, Red Hour Productions and Smart Entertainment	Paramount Pictures (Worldwide); GAGA (Japan)	
April 13, 2007	Disturbia (Note: Co-owned by Revolution Studios)	Cold Spring Pictures and The Montecito Picture Company	Paramount Pictures (Worldwide); Kadokawa Herald Pictures (Japan)	
July 3, 2007	Transformers	Paramount Pictures, Hasbro Films and Di Bonaventura Pictures	Paramount Pictures	Nominated - Saturn Award for Best Science Fiction Film
October 5, 2007	The Heartbreak Kid	Davis Entertainment, Conundrum Entertainment and Radar Pictures	Paramount Pictures	
October 19, 2007	Things We Lost in the Fire	Neal Street Productions	Paramount Pictures (Worldwide); Kadokawa Herald Pictures (Japan)	
December 14, 2007	The Kite Runner	Parkes+MacDonald, Sidney Kimmel Entertainment and Participant Productions	Paramount Classics (Worldwide); Sandrew Metronome (Scandinavia); Filmauro (Italy); Kadokawa Herald Pictures (Japan)	Nominated - BAFTA Award for Best Film Not in the English Language; Nominated - Critics' Choice Movie Award for Best Picture; Nominated - Golden Globe Award for Best Foreign Language Film
December 21, 2007	Sweeney Todd: The Demon Barber of Fleet Street	Warner Bros. Pictures, Parkes/MacDonald Productions, Image Nation and The Zanuck Company	Paramount Pictures (United States and Canada); Warner Bros. Pictures (International)	Golden Globe Award for Best Motion Picture - Musical or Comedy; Saturn Award for Best Horror Film; Nominated - Critics' Choice Movie Award for Best Picture
April 4, 2008	The Ruins	Spyglass Entertainment and Red Hour Productions	Paramount Pictures (Worldwide); Forum Film (Poland and Hungary); ZON Lusomundo (Portugal, Angola and Mozambique); Village Films (Greece and Cyprus)	
August 13, 2008	Tropic Thunder	Red Hour Productions	Paramount Pictures	Critics' Choice Movie Award for Best Comedy; Nominated - Satellite Award for Best Film - Musical or Comedy
September 19, 2008	Ghost Town	Spyglass Entertainment and Pariah	Paramount Pictures (Worldwide); Kinowelt Filmverleih (Germany and Austria); Frenetic Films (Switzerland); Svensk Filmindustri (Scandinavia); Forum Film (Israel)	
September 26, 2008	Eagle Eye	K/O Paper Products and Goldcrest Pictures	Paramount Pictures (Worldwide); Kadokawa Herald Pictures (Japan)	Nominated - Saturn Award for Best Science Fiction Film
December 26, 2008	Revolutionary Road	BBC Films, Neal Street Productions and Evamere Entertainment	Paramount Vantage	Nominated - Bodil Award for Best American Film; Nominated - Golden Globe Award for Best Motion Picture - Drama; Nominated - Satellite Award for Best Film - Drama
January 16, 2009	Hotel for Dogs	Nickelodeon Movies, Cold Spring Pictures, The Donners' Company and The Montecito Picture Company	Paramount Pictures	
January 30, 2009	The Uninvited	Cold Spring Pictures, Parkes/MacDonald Productions, The Montecito Picture Company and Vertigo Entertainment	Paramount Pictures	
March 20, 2009	I Love You, Man	De Line Pictures, Bernard Gayle Productions and The Montecito Picture Company	Paramount Pictures	Nominated - GLAAD Media Award for Outstanding Film - Wide Release
April 24, 2009	The Soloist	Universal Pictures, StudioCanal, Participant Media, Between Two Trees, Working Title Films and Krasnoff Foster Entertainment	Paramount Pictures (United States and Canada); StudioCanal (France); Universal Pictures (International)	
June 24, 2009	Transformers: Revenge of the Fallen	Paramount Pictures, Hasbro Films and Di Bonaventura Pictures	Paramount Pictures	Nominated - Saturn Award for Best Science Fiction Film
August 11, 2009	Road Trip: Beer Pong	Paramount Famous Productions	Paramount Home Entertainment	direct-to-video film
December 11, 2009	The Lovely Bones	Film4 and WingNut Films	Paramount Pictures	Nominated - Saturn Award for Best Fantasy Film

== 2010s ==
Release date	Title	Co-production with	Distributor	Notes
March 12, 2010	She's Out of My League	Mosaic Media Group	Paramount Pictures	
July 30, 2010	Dinner for Schmucks	Spyglass Entertainment, Parkes/MacDonald Productions, Everyman Pictures and Reliance Entertainment	Paramount Pictures (Worldwide); Reliance BIG Pictures (India)	
February 18, 2011	I Am Number Four	Reliance Entertainment and Bay Films	Touchstone Pictures (Worldwide; through Walt Disney Studios Motion Pictures); Reliance Entertainment (India)	first DreamWorks Pictures film to be distributed by Walt Disney Studios Motion Pictures under the Touchstone Pictures banner
July 29, 2011	Cowboys & Aliens	Universal Pictures, Reliance Entertainment, Relativity Media, Imagine Entertainment, K/O Paper Products, Fairview Entertainment and Platinum Studios	Universal Pictures (United States and Canada); Paramount Pictures (International); Reliance Entertainment (India)	
August 10, 2011	The Help	Reliance Entertainment, Participant Media, Imagenation Abu Dhabi, 1492 Pictures and Harbinger Pictures	Touchstone Pictures (Worldwide; through Walt Disney Studios Motion Pictures); Reliance Entertainment (India)	Nominated - Academy Award for Best Picture; Nominated - BAFTA Award for Best Film; Nominated - Critics' Choice Movie Award for Best Picture; Nominated - Golden Globe Award for Best Motion Picture - Drama; Nominated - Satellite Award for Best Film
August 19, 2011	Fright Night	Reliance Entertainment, Gaeta/Rosenzweig Films and Michael De Luca Productions	Touchstone Pictures (Worldwide; through Walt Disney Studios Motion Pictures); Reliance Entertainment (India)	
October 7, 2011	Real Steel	Reliance Entertainment, 21 Laps Entertainment and Montford Murphy Productions	Touchstone Pictures (Worldwide; through Walt Disney Studios Motion Pictures); Reliance Entertainment (India)	
December 25, 2011	War Horse	Reliance Entertainment, Amblin Entertainment and the Kennedy/Marshall Company	Touchstone Pictures (Worldwide; through Walt Disney Studios Motion Pictures); Reliance Entertainment (India)	Nominated - Academy Award for Best Picture; Nominated - Critics' Choice Movie Award for Best Picture; Nominated - Satellite Award for Best Film; Nominated - Saturn Award for Best Action/Adventure/Thriller Film
March 9, 2012	A Thousand Words	Work After Midnight Films, Saturn Films and Varsity Pictures	Paramount Pictures	
June 29, 2012	People Like Us	Reliance Entertainment and K/O Paper Products	Touchstone Pictures (Worldwide; through Walt Disney Studios Motion Pictures); Reliance Entertainment (India)	
November 16, 2012	Lincoln	20th Century Fox, Reliance Entertainment, Participant Media, Amblin Entertainment and The Kennedy/Marshall Company	Touchstone Pictures (United States and Canada; through Walt Disney Studios Motion Pictures); 20th Century Fox (International); Reliance Entertainment (India)	Nominated - Academy Award for Best Picture; Nominated - BAFTA Award for Best Film; Nominated - Critics' Choice Movie Award for Best Picture; Nominated - David di Donatello for Best Foreign Film; Nominated - Golden Globe Award for Best Motion Picture - Drama; Nominated - Satellite Award for Best Film
October 18, 2013	The Fifth Estate	Reliance Entertainment, Participant Media and Anonymous Content	Touchstone Pictures (North and Latin America, Australia, New Zealand, Russia and Asia excluding India; through Walt Disney Studios Motion Pictures); Reliance Entertainment (India); Constantin Film Verleih (Germany and Austria); Ascot Elite Entertainment Group (Switzerland); Entertainment One (U.K., Ireland and the Benelux); Nordisk Film (Scandinavia); Italia Film (Middle East); ACME Film (Baltics); Blitz (former Yugoslavia and Albania); Odeon (Greece and Cyprus); Sam Film (Iceland); United King Films (Israel); Leone Film Group, Rai Cinema and 01 Distribution (Italy); Forum Film (Poland); NOS Audiovisuais (Portugal); Tripictures (Spain); Tiglon and Fida Film (Turkey); Metropolitan Filmexport (France); Inter-Film (Ukraine); MediaPro (Czech Republic, Slovakia and Romania); Times Media Films (South Africa)	
November 22, 2013	Delivery Man	Reliance Entertainment and Caramel Film	Touchstone Pictures (North and Latin America, Australia, New Zealand, Russia and Asia excluding India; through Walt Disney Studios Motion Pictures); Reliance Entertainment (India); Constantin Film Verleih (Germany and Austria); Ascot Elite Entertainment Group (Switzerland); Entertainment One (U.K., Ireland and the Benelux); Nordisk Film (Scandinavia); Italia Film (Middle East); ACME Film (Baltics); Blitz (former Yugoslavia and Albania); Odeon (Greece and Cyprus); Sam Film (Iceland); United King Films (Israel); Leone Film Group, Rai Cinema and 01 Distribution (Italy); Monolith Films (Poland); NOS Audiovisuais (Portugal); Tripictures (Spain); Chantier Films and Fida Film (Turkey); Metropolitan Filmexport (France); Inter-Film (Ukraine); Bontonfilm (Czech Republic and Slovakia); MediaPro Pictures (Romania); Pro Video Film & Video Distribution (Hungary); BTV Studios (Bulgaria); Times Media Films (South Africa)	
March 14, 2014	Need for Speed	Reliance Entertainment, Electronic Arts and Bandito Brothers	Touchstone Pictures (North and Latin America, Australia, New Zealand, Russia and Asia excluding India; through Walt Disney Studios Motion Pictures); Reliance Entertainment (India); Constantin Film Verleih (Germany and Austria); Ascot Elite Entertainment Group (Switzerland); Entertainment One (U.K., Ireland and the Benelux); Nordisk Film (Scandinavia); Italia Film (Middle East); ACME Film (Baltics); Blitz (former Yugoslavia and Albania); Odeon (Greece and Cyprus); Sam Film (Iceland); United King Films (Israel); Leone Film Group, Rai Cinema and 01 Distribution (Italy); Monolith Films (Poland); NOS Audiovisuais (Portugal); Tripictures (Spain); Tiglon and Fida Film (Turkey); Metropolitan Filmexport (France); Inter-Film (Ukraine); Bontonfilm (Czech Republic and Slovakia); MediaPro Pictures (Romania); Pro Video Film & Video Distribution (Hungary); BTV Studios (Bulgaria); Times Media Films (South Africa)	
August 8, 2014	The Hundred-Foot Journey	Reliance Entertainment, Participant Media, Image Nation, Amblin Entertainment and Harpo Films	Touchstone Pictures (North and Latin America, Australia, New Zealand, Russia and Asia excluding India; through Walt Disney Studios Motion Pictures); Reliance Entertainment (India); Constantin Film Verleih (Germany and Austria); Ascot Elite Entertainment Group (Switzerland); Entertainment One (U.K., Ireland and the Benelux); Nordisk Film (Scandinavia); Italia Film (Middle East); ACME Film (Baltics); Blitz (former Yugoslavia and Albania); Odeon (Greece and Cyprus); Sam Film (Iceland); United King Films (Israel); Leone Film Group, The Space Movies and Universal Pictures (Italy); Monolith Films (Poland); NOS Audiovisuais (Portugal); Tripictures (Spain); Pinema (Turkey); Metropolitan Filmexport (France); Inter-Film (Ukraine); Bontonfilm (Czech Republic and Slovakia); MediaPro Pictures (Romania); Pro Video Film & Video Distribution (Hungary); BTV Studios (Bulgaria); Times Media Films (South Africa)	
October 16, 2015	Bridge of Spies	Fox 2000 Pictures, Reliance Entertainment, Participant Media, Afterworks Limited, Studio Babelsberg, Amblin Entertainment and Marc Platt Productions	Touchstone Pictures (United States and Canada; through Walt Disney Studios Motion Pictures); 20th Century Fox (International); Reliance Entertainment (India)	David di Donatello for Best Foreign Film; Saturn Award for Best Thriller Film; Nominated - Academy Award for Best Picture; Nominated - BAFTA Award for Best Film; Nominated - Critics' Choice Movie Award for Best Picture; Nominated - Satellite Award for Best Film
September 2, 2016	The Light Between Oceans	Reliance Entertainment, Participant Media and Heyday Films	Touchstone Pictures (United States and Canada; through Walt Disney Studios Motion Pictures); Reliance Entertainment (India); Constantin Film Verleih (Germany and Austria); Ascot Elite Entertainment Group (Switzerland); Entertainment One (U.K., Ireland, Australia, New Zealand and the Benelux); Nordisk Film (Scandinavia); Italia Film (Middle East); ACME Film (Baltics); Blitz (former Yugoslavia and Albania); Odeon (Greece and Cyprus); Sam Film (Iceland); United King Films (Israel); Leone Film Group and Eagle Pictures (Italy); Monolith Films (Poland); NOS Audiovisuais (Portugal); Tripictures and DeAPlaneta (Spain); Pinema (Turkey); Metropolitan Filmexport (France); Ukrainian Film Distribution (Ukraine); Bioscop (Czech Republic); Magic Box (Slovakia); Freeman Film (Hungary and Romania); Times Media Films (South Africa); CDC United Network (Latin America); Arthouse (Russia); Mongkol Major (Thailand); MVP Entertainment (Vietnam); Shaw Organisation (Singapore); Golden Scene (Hong Kong); Vie Vision Pictures and CMC Entertainment (Taiwan); Happinet Phantom Studios (Japan); CGV (Korea)	last DreamWorks Pictures film to be distributed by Walt Disney Studios Motion Pictures under the Touchstone Pictures banner
October 7, 2016	The Girl on the Train	Reliance Entertainment and Marc Platt Productions	Universal Pictures (North and Latin America, Russia, Japan, Taiwan, Thailand, Malaysia, Singapore and the Philippines); Reliance Entertainment (India); CJ Entertainment (Korea, Vietnam and Indonesia); Constantin Film Verleih (Germany and Austria); Ascot Elite Entertainment Group (Switzerland); Entertainment One (U.K., Ireland, Australia, New Zealand and the Benelux); Nordisk Film (Scandinavia); Italia Film (Middle East); ACME Film (Baltics); Blitz (former Yugoslavia and Albania); Odeon (Greece and Cyprus); Sam Film (Iceland); United King Films (Israel); Leone Film Group, Rai Cinema and 01 Distribution (Italy); Monolith Films (Poland); NOS Audiovisuais (Portugal); DeAPlaneta (Spain); Pinema (Turkey); Metropolitan Filmexport (France); Ukrainian Film Distribution (Ukraine); Freeman Entertainment (Czech Republic, Hungary and Romania); Forum Film (Slovakia); Lenta (Bulgaria); Times Media Films (South Africa); Golden Scene (Hong Kong)	Nominated - Saturn Award for Best Thriller Film
December 9, 2016	Office Christmas Party	Reliance Entertainment, Bluegrass Films and Entertainment 360	Paramount Pictures (North and Latin America, Italy, Russia, Japan, Hong Kong, Taiwan, Singapore, Thailand, Malaysia and the Philippines); Reliance Entertainment (India); CJ Entertainment (Korea, Vietnam and Indonesia); Constantin Film (Germany and Austria) Ascot Elite Entertainment Group (Switzerland); Entertainment One (U.K., Ireland, Australia, New Zealand and the Benelux); Nordisk Film (Scandinavia); Italia Film (Middle East); ACME Film (Baltics); Blitz (former Yugoslavia and Albania); Odeon (Greece and Cyprus); Sam Film (Iceland); United King Films (Israel); Monolith Films (Poland); NOS Audiovisuais (Portugal); Tripictures and DeAPlaneta (Spain); Pinema (Turkey); Metropolitan Filmexport (France); Ukrainian Film Distribution (Ukraine); Freeman Entertainment (Czech Republic, Hungary and Romania); Forum Film (Slovakia); Times Media Films (South Africa)	
March 31, 2017	Ghost in the Shell	Paramount Pictures, Reliance Entertainment, Shanghai Film Group, Steven Paul Productions, Huahua Media and Arad Productions	Paramount Pictures (Worldwide); Reliance Entertainment (India); Italia Film (Middle East); ACME Film (Baltics); Blitz (former Yugoslavia and Albania)	
October 27, 2017	Thank You for Your Service	Reliance Entertainment and Rahway Road Productions	Universal Pictures (North and Latin America, Japan, Taiwan, Thailand, Malaysia, Singapore and the Philippines); Reliance Entertainment (India); CJ Entertainment (Korea, Vietnam and Indonesia); Constantin Film (Germany and Austria); Entertainment One (U.K., Ireland, Australia, New Zealand and the Benelux); Nordisk Film (Scandinavia); Italia Film (Middle East); ACME Film (Baltics); Blitz (former Yugoslavia and Albania); Odeon (Greece and Cyprus); Sam Film (Iceland); United King Films (Israel); Monolith Films (Poland); NOS Audiovisuais (Portugal); Tripictures and DeAPlaneta (Spain); Pinema (Turkey); Metropolitan Filmexport (France); MediaPro (Czech Republic, Slovakia, Bulgaria, Hungary and Romania); Times Media Films (South Africa); Intercontinental Film Distributors (Hong Kong)	
December 22, 2017	The Post	20th Century Fox, Reliance Entertainment, Amblin Entertainment, Participant Media, Pascal Pictures and Star Thrower Entertainment	20th Century Fox (United States and Canada); Universal Pictures (Latin America, France, Germany, Austria, Switzerland, the CIS, Japan, Taiwan, Thailand, Malaysia, Singapore and the Philippines); Reliance Entertainment (India); CJ Entertainment (Korea, Vietnam and Indonesia); Entertainment One (U.K., Ireland, Australia, New Zealand, the Benelux and Spain); Nordisk Film (Scandinavia); Italia Film (Middle East); ACME Film (Baltics); Blitz (former Yugoslavia and Albania); Odeon (Greece and Cyprus); Sam Film (Iceland); United King Films (Israel); Leone Film Group, Rai Cinema and 01 Distribution (Italy); Monolith Films (Poland); NOS Audiovisuais (Portugal); Pinema (Turkey); Vertical Entertainment (Czech Republic and Romania); Freeman Entertainment (Hungary); Lenta (Bulgaria); Forum Film (Slovakia); Times Media Films (South Africa); Intercontinental Film Distributors (Hong Kong)	National Board of Review Award for Best Film; Nominated - Academy Award for Best Picture; Nominated - Critics' Choice Movie Award for Best Picture; Nominated - Golden Globe Award for Best Motion Picture - Drama; Nominated - Saturn Award for Best Thriller Film
October 12, 2018	First Man	Universal Pictures, Temple Hill Entertainment and Perfect World Pictures	Universal Pictures	Nominated - Critics' Choice Movie Award for Best Picture; Nominated - Golden Lion; Nominated - Satellite Award for Best Film - Drama
November 16, 2018	Green Book	Participant Media, Innisfree Pictures and Cinetic Media	Universal Pictures (United States and Canada); Reliance Entertainment (India); CJ Entertainment (Korea, Vietnam and Indonesia); Huaxia Film Distribution and Alibaba Pictures (China); Entertainment One (U.K., Ireland, Australia, New Zealand, Germany, Austria, the Benelux and Spain); Nordisk Film (Scandinavia); Lev Cinemas (Israel); Ascot Elite Entertainment Group (Switzerland); Italia Film (Middle East); ACME Film (Baltics); Capella Film (Russia); Spentzos Film (Greece and Cyprus); Sam Film (Iceland); Leone Film Group and Eagle Pictures (Italy); Pris Audiovisuais (Portugal); Chantier Films (Turkey); Metropolitan Filmexport (France); Arthouse (Ukraine); M2 Films (Eastern Europe); Empire Entertainment (South Africa); Diamond Films and Sun Distribution Group (Latin America); Mongkol Major (Thailand); Shaw Organisation (Singapore); Intercontinental Film Distributors (Hong Kong); Catchplay (Taiwan); Gaga (Japan); Pioneer Films (Philippines); MVP Entertainment (Malaysia)	Academy Award for Best Picture; National Board of Review Award for Best Film; Golden Globe Award for Best Motion Picture - Musical or Comedy; Toronto International Film Festival People's Choice Award; Nominated - BAFTA Award for Best Film; Nominated - Critics' Choice Movie Award for Best Picture; Nominated - David di Donatello for Best Foreign Film; Nominated - Satellite Award for Best Film - Musical or Comedy
December 21, 2018	Welcome to Marwen	Universal Pictures, ImageMovers and Perfect World Pictures	Universal Pictures	
December 25, 2019	1917	Reliance Entertainment, Neal Street Productions, Mogambo and New Republic Pictures	Universal Pictures (North and Latin America, France, Germany, Austria, Switzerland, the CIS, Japan, Taiwan, Thailand, Malaysia, Singapore and the Philippines); Reliance Entertainment (India); CJ Entertainment (Korea, Vietnam and Indonesia); China Film Co., Ltd. and Alibaba Pictures (China); Entertainment One (U.K., Ireland, Australia, New Zealand and Spain); WW Entertainment (Benelux); Nordisk Film (Scandinavia); Italia Film (Middle East); ACME Film (Baltics); Blitz (former Yugoslavia and Albania); Odeon (Greece and Cyprus); Sam Film (Iceland); United King Films (Israel); Leone Film Group, Rai Cinema and 01 Distribution (Italy); Monolith Films (Poland); NOS Audiovisuais (Portugal); TME Films (Turkey); Vertical Entertainment (Czech Republic and Romania); Freeman Entertainment (Hungary); Forum Film (Slovakia); Lenta (Bulgaria); Empire Entertainment (South Africa); Intercontinental Film Distributors (Hong Kong)	BAFTA Award for Best Film; BAFTA Award for Outstanding British Film; David di Donatello for Best Foreign Film; Golden Globe Award for Best Motion Picture - Drama; Nominated - Academy Award for Best Picture; Nominated - Bodil Award for Best Non-American Film; Nominated - César Award for Best Foreign Film; Nominated - Critics' Choice Movie Award for Best Picture; Nominated - Japan Academy Film Prize for Outstanding Foreign Language Film; Nominated - Satellite Award for Best Film - Drama; Nominated - Saturn Award for Best Action or Adventure Film

== 2020s ==
Release date	Title	Co-production with	Distributor	Notes
January 24, 2020	The Turning	Reliance Entertainment, Vertigo Entertainment and Chislehurst Entertainment	Universal Pictures (North and Latin America, Australia, New Zealand, France, Germany, Austria, Switzerland, the CIS, Japan, Taiwan, Thailand, Malaysia, Singapore and the Philippines); Reliance Entertainment (India); CJ Entertainment (Korea, Vietnam and Indonesia); Entertainment One (U.K., Ireland, Australia, New Zealand and Spain); WW Entertainment (Benelux); Nordisk Film (Scandinavia); Italia Film (Middle East); ACME Film (Baltics); Blitz (former Yugoslavia and Albania); Odeon (Greece and Cyprus); Sam Film (Iceland); United King Films (Israel); Leone Film Group, Rai Cinema and 01 Distribution (Italy); Monolith Films (Poland); NOS Audiovisuais (Portugal); Fida Film (Turkey); MediaPro (Czech Republic, Slovakia, Bulgaria, Hungary and Romania); Empire Entertainment (South Africa); Intercontinental Film Distributors (Hong Kong)	
September 25, 2020	The Trial of the Chicago 7	Paramount Pictures, Cross Creek Pictures, Marc Platt Productions, and ShivHans Pictures	Netflix	Nominated - Academy Award for Best Picture; Nominated - BAFTA Award for Best Film; Nominated - Bodil Award for Best American Film; Nominated - Critics' Choice Movie Award for Best Picture; Nominated - Golden Globe Award for Best Motion Picture - Drama; Nominated - Satellite Award for Best Film - Drama
May 29, 2021	Oslo	HBO Films, Bold Films, Marc Platt Productions, and SRO Productions	HBO	Critics' Choice Television Award for Best Movie Made for Television; Satellite Award for Best Television Film; Nominated - Primetime Emmy Award for Outstanding Television Movie
July 30, 2021	Stillwater	Participant, Anonymous Content, Slow Pony, 3dot Productions, and Supernatural Pictures	Focus Features (North and Latin America, France, Germany, Austria, Switzerland, Italy, Eastern Europe, the CIS, South Africa, Japan, Taiwan, Thailand, Malaysia, Singapore and the Philippines); Reliance Entertainment (India); CJ Entertainment (Korea, Vietnam and Indonesia); Parco (Japan); Entertainment One (U.K., Ireland, Australia, New Zealand and Spain); WW Entertainment (Benelux); Nordisk Film (Scandinavia); Italia Film (Middle East); Odeon (Greece and Cyprus); Sam Film (Iceland); United King Films (Israel); NOS Audiovisuais (Portugal); The Moments Entertainment (Turkey); Intercontinental Film Distributors (Hong Kong)	
August 5, 2022	Easter Sunday	Reliance Entertainment and Rideback	Universal Pictures (North and Latin America, France, Germany, Austria, Switzerland, the CIS, Japan, Taiwan, Thailand, Malaysia, Singapore and the Philippines); Reliance Entertainment (India); CJ Entertainment (Korea, Vietnam and Indonesia); WW Entertainment (Benelux); Nordisk Film (Scandinavia); Italia Film (Middle East); ACME Film (Baltics); Blitz (former Yugoslavia and Albania); Odeon (Greece and Cyprus); Sam Film (Iceland); United King Films (Israel); Leone Film Group, Rai Cinema and 01 Distribution (Italy); Monolith Films (Poland); NOS Audiovisuais (Portugal); The Moments Entertainment (Turkey); MediaPro (Czech Republic, Slovakia, Bulgaria, Hungary and Romania); Empire Entertainment (South Africa); Intercontinental Film Distributors (Hong Kong)	
September 30, 2022	The Good House	Participant, Reliance Entertainment, FilmNation Entertainment, and Faliro House	Lionsgate and Roadside Attractions (United States and Canada); Reliance Entertainment (India); CJ Entertainment (Korea, Vietnam and Indonesia); WW Entertainment (Benelux); Nordisk Film (Scandinavia); Italia Film (Middle East); ACME Film (Baltics); Blitz (former Yugoslavia and Albania); Odeon (Greece and Cyprus); Sam Film (Iceland); United King Films (Israel); Leone Film Group, Rai Cinema and 01 Distribution (Italy); Diamond Films (Spain); Monolith Films (Poland); NOS Audiovisuais (Portugal); The Moments Entertainment (Turkey); MediaPro (Czech Republic, Slovakia, Bulgaria, Hungary and Romania); Empire Entertainment (South Africa); Intercontinental Film Distributors (Hong Kong)	
August 11, 2023	The Last Voyage of the Demeter	Reliance Entertainment, Storyworks Productions, Studio Babelsberg, Phoenix Pictures and Wise Owl Media	Universal Pictures (North and Latin America, France, Germany, Austria, Switzerland, Japan, Taiwan, Thailand, Malaysia, Singapore and the Philippines); Reliance Entertainment (India); CJ Entertainment (Korea, Vietnam and Indonesia); Lionsgate (U.K. and Ireland); StudioCanal (Australia and New Zealand); WW Entertainment (Benelux); Nordisk Film (Scandinavia); Italia Film (Middle East); ACME Film (Baltics); Blitz (former Yugoslavia and Albania); Odeon (Greece and Cyprus); Sam Film (Iceland); United King Films (Israel); Leone Film Group, Rai Cinema and 01 Distribution (Italy); Diamond Films (Spain); Monolith Films (Poland); NOS Audiovisuais (Portugal); The Moments Entertainment (Turkey); MediaPro (Czech Republic, Slovakia, Bulgaria, Hungary and Romania); Empire Entertainment (South Africa); Intercontinental Film Distributors (Hong Kong)	
December 13, 2024	Carry-On	Dylan Clark Productions	Netflix	
July 3, 2025	Long Distance	Reliance Entertainment and Automatik	Hulu	
