= Crooked Arrows =

- Official poster
- Directed by: Steve Rash
- Written by: Brad Riddell; Todd Baird
- Produced by: Adam Leff; J. Todd Harris; Jacques Vroom III; Miriam Marcus; Mark Robert Ellis; Mitchell Peck
- Starring: Brandon Routh; Chelsea Ricketts; Gil Birmingham; Crystal Allen
- Cinematography: Dan Stoloff
- Edited by: Bart Rachmil; Danny Saphire
- Music by: Brian Ralston
- Production company: Sports Studio
- Distributed by: 20th Century Fox Home Entertainment; Freestyle Releasing
- Release date: May 18, 2012
- Running time: 105 minutes
- Country: United States
- Language: English
- Budget: $13 million
- Box office: $1,832,541

Crooked Arrows is a 2012 American sports drama film directed by Steve Rash, written by Brad Riddell and Todd Baird, and stars Brandon Routh. The story is centered on a Native American (Haudenosaunee) lacrosse team making its way through a prep school league tournament in Upstate New York. Crooked Arrows garnered mixed reviews from critics who felt it underdelivered in its showcase of Native American heritage and the sport of lacrosse.

The film was also a box office flop, grossing just $1.8 million against a production budget of $13 million.

Various lacrosse companies and associations sponsored and supported the film, such as Reebok. The movie and the associated companies hoped to pique more interest in the sport of lacrosse.

== Plot ==
A mixed-blood Native American, Joe Logan aka "Logan the Legend" is eager to modernize his reservation's casino by expanding on the land of his ancestors, but first he must prove himself to his father, the traditionalist Tribal Chairman. The Chairman will only grant Joe's request on the condition that he meets his challenge - coaching the reservation's struggling high school lacrosse team, which competes against the better equipped and better trained players of the Prep School league. Joe reluctantly accepts, only to realize the challenge will require a leadership he had forfeited years ago as a star lacrosse player. Lost on how to reach his players, Joe finds that the answer lies deep in the traditional cultural heritage of the sport. Gaining the respect of his team, Joe helps them restore pride and return the game of lacrosse to their people.

== Cast ==
- Brandon Routh as Joe Logan
- Chelsea Ricketts as Nadie Logan
- Gil Birmingham as Ben Logan
- Crystal Allen as Julie Gifford
- Jack Vandervelde as Toby Gifford
- Dennis Ambriz as Crooked Arrow
- Robert Coffie as Crooked Arrow Fan
- Tyler Hill as Jimmy Silverfoot
- Jerome Vincent as Reed
- Lee Cunningham as Mrs. Logan (mother)
- Jartivius Thompson III as Dane the Janitor
- Stephen Serewicz as head of construction crew (forklift driver)

The film features cameo appearances by former Tufts men's lacrosse coach and Brown men's lacrosse coach Mike Daly, former Virginia Cavaliers men's lacrosse coach Dom Starsia, Syracuse Orange men's lacrosse coach John Desko, and Syracuse Orange women's lacrosse coach Gary Gait; referees Tom Kitterick, Brian Lenane, and Bill Doherty; and lacrosse stars Paul Rabil, Zack Greer, and Brodie Merrill.

== Reception ==
=== Critical reception ===
On review aggregator website Rotten Tomatoes, the film holds a 42% approval rating based on 26 reviews, with an average rating of 5.4/10. On Metacritic, which assigns a normalized rating out of 100 to reviews from mainstream critics, the film has an average score of 42, based on 13 reviews.

The Austin Chronicle's Marjorie Baumgarten commended the filmmakers for making tweaks to the underdog sports movie formula by putting a "novel focus" on a rarely seen sport within the context of Native American history but felt it was "predictable" overall. Kalvin Henely of Slant Magazine said: "Although it adheres to the tried-and-true sports movie formula of an underdog team striving to overcome their limitations to become winners, Crooked Arrows lacks captivating emotional momentum." Farran Smith Nehme of the New York Post was critical of the cast of young lacrosse players being given stock characters and the sport itself not being explained in enough detail, saying the film overall comes across like an "after-school special." Daniel M. Gold from The New York Times wrote that: "Crooked Arrows gets points for its glimpses of Native American culture and history — the film’s backers include the Onondaga Nation — but too many of these scenes are disappointingly static. And the games themselves give little sense of the flow or exquisite precision of lacrosse. Splitting the difference between heritage film and sports flick, Crooked Arrows gets neither right, whiffing at an open net."

=== Box office ===
In its opening weekend, the film grossed $257,364 in 55 theaters, ranking at #24 nationally. By the end of its run, Crooked Arrows grossed $1,832,541 domestically.

=== Home media ===
Crooked Arrows was released on DVD and Blu-ray on October 23, 2012.
