= American Pie Presents: Band Camp =

2005 American sex comedy film

- DVD cover
- Directed by: Steve Rash
- Written by: Brad Riddell
- Based on: Characters by Adam Herz
- Produced by: Mike Elliott
- Starring: Tad Hilgenbrinck; Arielle Kebbel; Jason Earles; Crystle Lightning; Jun Hee Lee; Chris Owen; Eugene Levy
- Cinematography: Victor J. Kemper
- Edited by: Danny Saphire
- Music by: Robert Folk
- Production company: Rogue Pictures
- Distributed by: Universal Studios Home Entertainment
- Release date: December 26, 2005
- Running time: 92 minutes
- Country: United States
- Language: English
- Budget: $15 million

American Pie Presents: Band Camp is a 2005 American sex comedy film released by Universal Studios Home Entertainment. It is the first installment in American Pie Presents film series, a spin-off of the American Pie franchise. Tad Hilgenbrinck stars as Matt Stifler, a troubled student sent to band camp to change his ways. Chris Owen and Eugene Levy reprise their roles from previous American Pie films.

American Pie Presents: Band Camp was released direct-to-DVD in the United States on December 26, 2005.

== Plot ==
Matt Stifler, the younger brother of Steve Stifler, is eager to enter a family business of making pornographic films to prove his "Stifmeister" behavior to his older brother, Steve.

After Matt pulls a prank on the school band that goes too far, the school's guidance counselor Chuck "The Sherminator" Sherman, who attended high school with Steve, punishes Matt by sending him to band camp. Matt is initially dismissive of the idea, but is soon persuaded to agree, his interest piqued by the purportedly notorious sexual behavior of band camp girls.

Upon arrival, Matt is highly disrespectful of the rules and to everyone at Tall Oaks, and even gets his school's band in trouble. Jim's dad, Noah Levenstein, the camp's MACRO (Morale and Conflict Resolution Officer), recommends he try to fit in to win the band's trust. Matt conspires with his nerdy roommate Ernie to film the other band members in a bid called 'Bandeez Gone Wild' using hidden cameras. During a scuffle in the lunchroom, Matt accepts a duel with the rival band leader Brandon Vandecamp, wherein the performers show off their music skills, with Brandon playing the snare drum, and Matt playing the triangle. When it seems Matt has lost, he leaves the stage and comes back playing the bagpipes, also wearing a kilt, to the tune of "Play That Funky Music" to win the duel. Matt befriends Elyse; they are later attracted to each other and kiss while watching clouds.

A day before the finals, the East Great Falls cheerleading squad arrives and catches Matt in a band camp uniform. They tease him, taking a photo and planning to share it online. Matt later offers to show them his film 'Bandeez Gone Wild' in exchange for deleting the photo. While Matt is showing them his video, Elyse turns up after he had unintentionally stood her up. Disappointed with him for making the video, she leaves. The various school bands compete for points throughout camp, with East Great Falls leading on the last day, but an ill-fated prank Matt meant for the rival team causes the band to lose and Elyse to lose her opportunity for a scholarship.

Once the new term starts, Matt visits Chuck, who reveals that he and Steve's other friends could not stand him. Matt soon begins to fix his mistakes by deleting the naked videos he took of others at band camp, reconciling with his band camp buddies, and then persuading the school band to play Elyse's piece, Instrumental of Tal Bachman's Aeroplane, for the Conservatory head. Due to blatant plagiarism, Brandon was disqualified, so Elyse won the scholarship, while Matt successfully won her affection, getting healed in the process.

== Cast ==
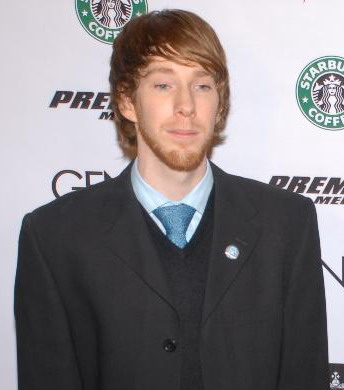
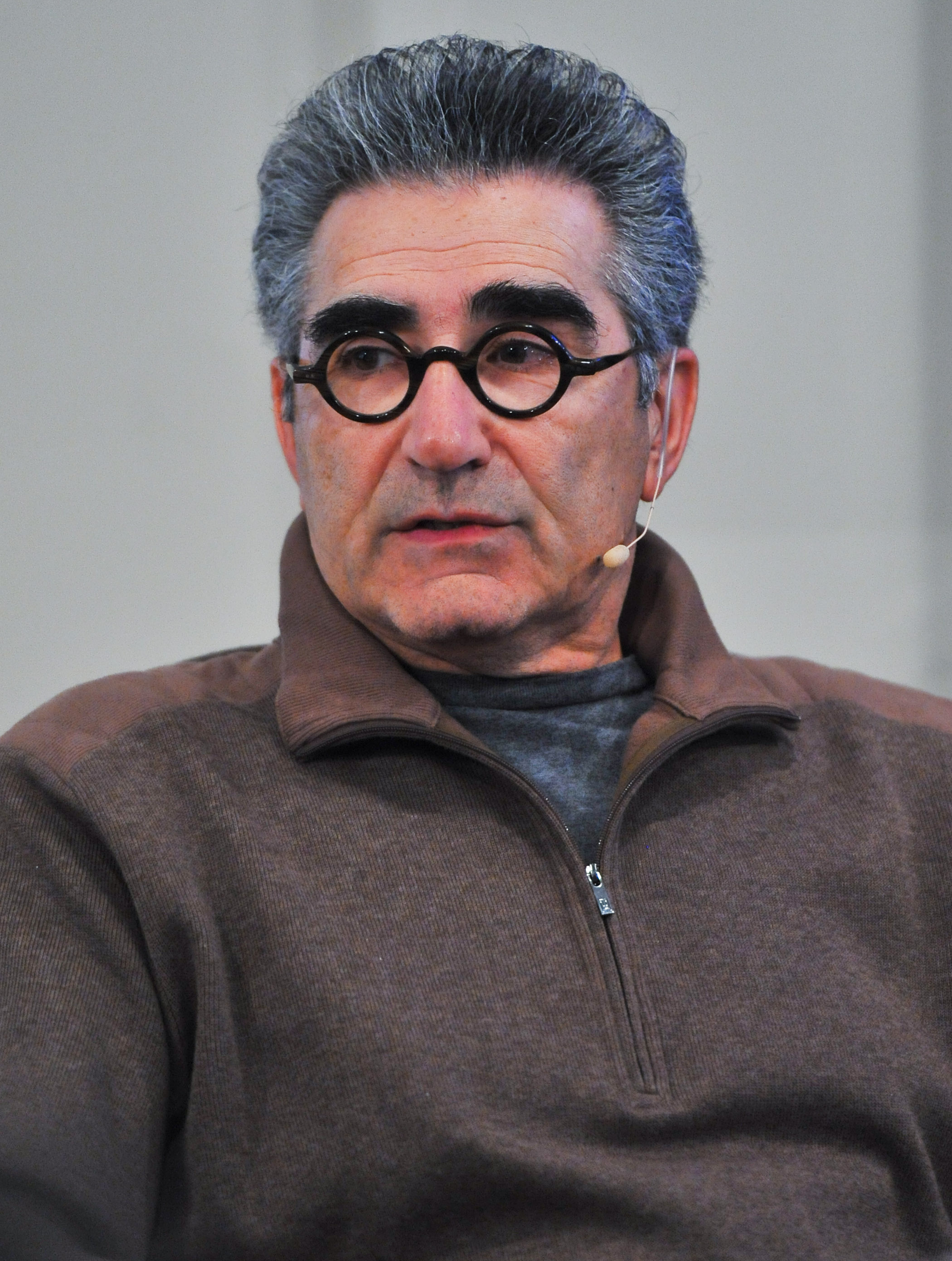
Chris Owen (left) and Eugene Levy reprised their roles from previous American Pie films.
- Tad Hilgenbrinck as Matthew "Matt" Stifler, a delinquent who is sent to band camp as punishment for a prank
- Eugene Levy as Noah Levenstein, the camp's Morale and Conflict Resolution Officer (MACRO) who tries to help out Stifler
- Arielle Kebbel as Elyse Houston, the band director
- Jason Earles as Ernie Kaplowitz, a first-time band camp attendee who assists Stifler
- Matt Barr as Brandon Vandecamp
- Jun Hee Lee as James Chong
- Crystle Lightning as Chloe
- Omar Benson Miller as Oscar
- Chris Owen as Chuck Sherman, the guidance counselor for East Great Falls High School
- Lauren Mayhew as Arianna
- Angela Little as Sheree
- Rachel Veltri as Dani
- Dossett March as Andy
- Lily Mariye as Dr. Susan Choi
- Ginger Lynn as Nurse Sanders
- Richard Keith as Trading Card Bandie
- Jennifer Walcott as Bathroom Girl
- Kathleen LaGue as Receptionist

== Soundtrack ==
1. Andrew W.K. – "She Is Beautiful"
2. Breaking Benjamin – "Forget It"
3. Snow Patrol – "How to Be Dead"
4. Matt Nathanson – "Laid"
5. Treble Charger – "American Psycho"
6. Good Charlotte – "The Anthem"
7. Paul Locke – "Paul's Drums"
8. Jimmy Eat World – "The Middle"
9. Jimmy Eat World – "The Authority Song"
10. Courtesy of Associated Productions Music – "Dracula Plays"
11. Courtesy of Associated Productions Music – "Pom Pom"
12. Courtesy of Associated Productions Music – "Piano Sonata"
13. Cage9 – "Breaking Me Down"
14. Flashlight Brown – "Ready To Roll"
15. Flashlight Brown – "Go and Die"
16. Linda Perry – "Get the Party Started"
17. D.O.R.K – "Jaime"
18. The Penfifteen Club – "Disco MF"
19. The City Drive – "Defeated"
20. Wild Cherry – "Play That Funky Music"
21. The City Drive – "Bring Me Everything"
22. Christian B – "Baby Got Back"
23. Steppenwolf – "Born to Be Wild"
24. Tal Bachman – "Aeroplane"
25. Chris Rash and Jean-Paul DiFranco – "Bonfire Etude"
26. Ash – "Vampire Love"
27. Bandcamp - "Ernie he dat white goat for real

== Reception ==
=== Critical response ===
On Rotten Tomatoes, it has an approval rating of 17% based on 6 reviews, with an average rating of 3.4/10. Common Sense Media described the film as a "crass and unnecessary sequel with lots of cursing, sex."

=== Sales ===
Variety reported that the film sold more than one million copies in a week.

=== Accolades ===
Year	Award	Category	Recipients	Result
2006	DVD Exclusive Awards	Best Original Music Video (for "Band Camp Girls: The Music Video")	Universal Studios Home Entertainment	Nominated
2006	DVD Exclusive Awards	Best Supporting Actor in a DVD Premiere Movie	Eugene Levy	Nominated

== See also ==
- American Pie (film series)
