= Comic Book Villains =

- Directed by: James Robinson
- Written by: James Robinson
- Starring: Donal Logue; Cary Elwes; Michael Rapaport; Natasha Lyonne; DJ Qualls
- Narrated by: DJ Qualls
- Distributed by: Lionsgate Films
- Release date: September 3, 2002
- Running time: 92 minutes
- Country: United States
- Language: English

Comic Book Villains is a 2002 American black comedy film written and directed by James Robinson and starring DJ Qualls, Donal Logue, Michael Rapaport, Natasha Lyonne and Eileen Brennan.

== Synopsis ==
Archie (DJ Qualls) hangs out at a local comic book store and watches and narrates the film. There are two comic book shops in town; one is owned by Raymond (Donal Logue) and the other owned by Norman and Judy Link (Michael Rapaport and Natasha Lyonne), a husband and wife.

Mrs. Cresswell (Eileen Brennan), an elderly woman finds a large collection of rare comics in mint condition while going through her recently deceased son's things, and the two stores compete to convince her to sell to them.

== Cast ==
- Donal Logue as Raymond McGillicudy
- Cary Elwes as Carter
- Michael Rapaport as Norman Link
- Natasha Lyonne as Judy Link
- DJ Qualls as Archie
- Eileen Brennan as Mrs. Cresswell
- Monet Mazur as Kiki
- Danny Masterson as Conan
- James Duval as Baz
