= Brad Riddell (screenwriter) =

American screenwriter and professor

- Education: B.A. in English; M.F.A. in Screenwriting
- Alma mater: University of Kentucky, University of Southern California
- Occupation: Screenwriter
- Years active: 2005–present
- Notable work: American Pie Presents: Band Camp; Road Trip: Beer Pong
- Website: www.BradRiddell.com

Brad Riddell is an American screenwriter, producer, director, and professor whose works include American Pie Presents: Band Camp (2005), Crooked Arrows (2012), Slap Shot: 3 The Junior League (2008), and Road Trip: Beer Pong (2009). He co-wrote, directed, and produced the independent comedy, Later Days (2021), with Sandy Sternshein. He has co-created two web series: Other People's Children (2017) with Anna Maria Hozian, and Distant Learners (2020) with Sandy Sternshein and David Pasquesi. He directed the short film, Ten More in 2017.

== Education ==
Riddell earned a BA in English with a minor in Theater from the University of Kentucky, and a MFA in screenwriting from the USC School of Cinematic Arts.

== Career ==
Riddell has written five produced feature films on assignment for Paramount, MTV, Universal and independent producers. His first film, American Pie: Band Camp, remains one of the highest-grossing live action DVD release in history, selling two million copies and reaching syndication on TBS. Crooked Arrows was released nationally in theaters in 2012, and is the first mainstream lacrosse movie ever produced. Later Days was given a limited theatrical release day and date with VOD on October 29, 2021.

== Teaching ==
Riddell taught MFA and BFA screenwriting courses at USC for seven years. He then went on to teach undergraduate courses at SUNY Oswego for one year, before joining DePaul's School of Cinematic Arts in 2012, where he is now an associate professor.

== Filmography ==
=== Feature films ===
| Year | Film | Studio |
|---|---|---|
| 2005 | American Pie Presents Band Camp | Universal Pictures |
| 2008 | Slap Shot 3: The Junior League | Universal Pictures |
| 2009 | Road Trip: Beer Pong | Paramount Pictures |
| 2012 | Crooked Arrows | 20th Century Fox Home Entertainment; Sony Pictures Entertainment |
| 2021 | Later Days | Gravitas Ventures |

=== Upcoming projects ===
Ridell's company Wry Mash Media has optioned Katrina Kittle‘s third novel, The Kindness of Strangers, which he will produce with Forever Safe Productions. The script will be written by Anna Maria Hozian, and Domenica Cameron-Scorsese is attached to direct.
