= Road Trip: Beer Pong =

2009 comedy film by Steve Rash

- Official DVD cover
- Directed by: Steve Rash
- Written by: Brad Riddell
- Based on: Road Trip by: Todd Phillips and; Scot Armstrong
- Produced by: Suzie Peterson
- Starring: Nestor Aaron Absera; Preston Jones; Danny Pudi; Michael Trotter; Julianna Guill; Julia Levy-Boeken; DJ Qualls
- Cinematography: Levie Isaacks
- Edited by: John Gilbert
- Music by: Transcenders
- Production companies: DreamWorks Pictures; Paramount Famous Productions
- Distributed by: Paramount Home Entertainment
- Release date: August 11, 2009
- Running time: 96 minutes
- Country: United States
- Language: English

Road Trip: Beer Pong (also known as Road Trip 2: Beer Pong or simply Road Trip 2) is a 2009 American road sex comedy film. The film is a direct-to-DVD standalone sequel to the 2000 comedy film Road Trip and directed by Steve Rash. The only original cast members to return for the sequel were DJ Qualls and Rhoda Griffis. The film was produced by DreamWorks Pictures and Paramount Famous Productions and released by Paramount Home Entertainment on August 11, 2009.

== Plot ==
Andy is egged on by his best friends to stop worrying so much about his girlfriend, Katy Hartman back home and start enjoying college life to the fullest. While enjoying his life, he remembers Jenna, a former girlfriend who is now a beer pong model and becomes infatuated with her. Andy and his friends decide to hit the road chasing Jenna and her model friends to compete in a beer pong tournament, but their plans get complicated when Katy decides to transfer to his university so she can be closer to him. They call on a son of a rich despot, Arash in hopes to get him to sponsor their road trip but instead are taken into custody by the CIA, who interrogate them and dump them in Bethesda. They steal a taxi and continue their journey, but make a pit stop in a family run strip club, only to run afoul of a gang of bikers. Short of cash, they pick up a hitchhiker hoping she will pay for a ride. Instead, she holds up a convenience store and steals the taxi.

Korkin prays for rescue and a school bus full of beautiful girls appears. The driver, Sarah is the daughter of the reverend who founded "Chastity Until Marriage" and quickly sees through their lies but agrees to continue their road trip to Nashville. Korkin makes it his mission to sleep with Sarah. Arash takes a turn driving the bus while the others sleep. While Sarah sleeps with her head on his lap, Korkin removes Sarah's bra and attempts to feel her up. However, Arash gets distracted by phone sex and has an accident, hitting a wild boar that becomes stuck under the truck. They stop the next day and Korkin realizes they are in Katy's hometown and they call in to her mother's house.

The gang eventually catch up with Jenna and the Beer Pong tour. A video Andy had intended as an anniversary present for Katy had been posted on the internet by Korkin. The video of him singing In the Buff has become a hit and Jenna has him perform it live on stage. The performance is also posted on the internet and Katy sees Andy kissing Jenna at the end of his performance.

Meanwhile, back on the bus where Korkin meet Sarah again, she says she's inspired by Andy's song in the previous performance and starts stripping meaning she's willing to have sex with Korkin. On the other hand, Andy was trying to have sex with Jenna but couldn't since he's actually in love with Katy. Due to this fact, Jenna then decided to give her blessing to Andy and his girlfriend. However, shortly after leaving Jenna's trailer, Andy gets a call from an enraged Katy that she wants to end their relationship. Heartbroken and angry at Korkin since it was his idea that the gang go for the road trip, he berates Korkin. Andy and the gang begin competing in the beer pong tournament. The film ends when Katy eventually shows up at the Beer Pong tournament and makes amends with Andy.

== Cast ==
- Preston Jones as Andy
- Michael Trotter as Korkin
- Nestor Aaron Absera as Jake
- Danny Pudi as Arash
- Julianna Guill as Katy Hartman
- Daniel Newman as Raz-r
- Julia Levy-Boeken as Jenna
- Leandra Terrazzano as Sarah
- Christina Bibby as Heidi
- Kimberly Banta as Momma Hartman
- Mary Cobb as Lydia
- DJ Qualls as Kyle Edwards
- Rhoda Griffis as Tour Group Mom
