= Oliver James (actor) =

English actor, musician, singer, and songwriter

- Born: Oliver James Hutson; April 22, 1980
- Education: Guildford School of Acting
- Occupations: Actor, musician, singer, songwriter
- Years active: 2002–2012

Oliver James (born Oliver James Hutson; 1980 or 1981) is an English former actor.

== Career ==
=== Acting career ===
James trained at the Guildford School of Acting and made his acting debut in the made-for-television short film School's Out as Dean. He then appeared in an episode for the BBC television series The Afternoon Play.

In 2002, James was cast as the role of Ian Wallace in the teen romantic comedy What a Girl Wants. The film was directed by Dennie Gordon and co-starred Amanda Bynes. The movie was released in 2003, to mixed critical reception, and a moderate box office with worldwide earnings of $50,732,139.

In 2004, James was cast to portray the role of Jay Corgan in New Line Cinema's musical drama film Raise Your Voice. The film which was directed by Sean McNamara and co-starred Hilary Duff. The film received negative reviews from critics and was a box-office bomb earning worldwide $14,867,514.

In 2006, James signed on for the BBC drama television series The Innocence Project portraying the role of Nick Benitz. The eight-episode first season received negative reviews from critics. Ratings were very poor and the BBC chose to pull the series midway through season one, with the show not being renewed for a second season.

In 2009, James portrayed the role of Ben in Paramount Home Entertainment's Direct-to-DVD sequel Without a Paddle: Nature's Calling. The film received negative reviews.

James is currently retired from acting and was last known to be working as a therapist and mindfulness practitioner in his hometown of Guildford.

=== Music career ===
Shortly after appearing in The Afternoon Play, James joined a boy band produced by Simon Fuller. He quit the band as soon as he was cast in What A Girl Wants, for which he learned to play the guitar and performed the songs "Long Time Coming" and "Greatest Story Ever Told" for the film's soundtrack. He played the acoustic guitar and provided vocals for a song in Raise Your Voice.

== Filmography ==
=== Film ===
Year	Title	Role
2002	School's Out	Dean
2003	What a Girl Wants	Ian Wallace
2004	Raise Your Voice	Jay Corgan
2009	Without a Paddle: Nature's Calling	Ben
2011	Roadkill	Ryan
2012	Black Forest	Gallen

=== Television ===
Year	Title	Role	Note
2003	The Afternoon Play	Dave	Episode: "Girls Weekend"
2006–2007	The Innocence Project	Nick Benitz	Main role
