= Mean Girls 2 =

2011 American teen comedy television film

- Official DVD cover
- Genre: Teen comedy
- Written by: Cliff Ruby; Elana Lesser; Allison Schroeder
- Directed by: Melanie Mayron
- Starring: Meaghan Martin; Maiara Walsh; Jennifer Stone; Nicole Gale Anderson; Claire Holt; Diego Boneta; Linden Ashby; Tim Meadows
- Music by: Transcenders
- Country of origin: United States
- Original language: English

Production
- Producer: George Engel
- Cinematography: Levie Isaacks
- Editor: Michael Jablow
- Running time: 97 minutes
- Production companies: Paramount Famous Productions (Note: The Paramount Pictures logo appears at the end.); Broadway Video

Original release
- Network: ABC Family
- Release: January 23, 2011

Related
- Mean Girls

Mean Girls 2 is a 2011 American teen comedy television film directed by Melanie Mayron and written by Cliff Ruby, Elana Lesser, and Allison Schroeder. It is a sequel to the 2004 film Mean Girls and the second film in the Mean Girls franchise.

The film stars Meaghan Martin, Maiara Walsh, Jennifer Stone, Nicole Gale Anderson, Claire Holt, Diego Boneta, and Linden Ashby. Tim Meadows reprises his role as the principal Ron Duvall.

It premiered on January 23, 2011, on ABC Family, and was released on DVD on February 1 by Paramount Home Entertainment. It was the last film produced by Paramount Famous Productions, a direct-to-video entertainment division of Paramount Pictures. It received negative reviews from critics.

== Plot ==
Jo Mitchell attends North Shore High School in Ohio after having transferred many times, hoping to attend Carnegie Mellon, her late mother's alma mater. On her first day, she encounters a clique called "The Plastics", composed of leader Mandi Weatherly, ditzy Chastity Meyer, and hypochondriac Hope Plotkin. Jo befriends Mandi's rival and outcast, Abby Hanover and they become embroiled in a prank war.

Jo's father is a mechanic who rebuilds engines for NASCAR. As a result, she is a good mechanic and excels in shop class, where she falls in love with a boy named Tyler.

Jo gives Abby a ride home on her Vespa. She meets Abby's father, a successful entrepreneur, who offers to pay Jo's college tuition in exchange for friendship with Abby. Jo reluctantly accepts, motivated by her desire to attend Carnegie Mellon. Jo, Tyler, and Abby become close friends, along with a journalist named Quinn Shinn, who has become obsessed with the Plastics ever since she came to high school.

Tyler takes Jo on a date, borrowing Mandi's boyfriend Nick's convertible. Unknown to them, however, the car is bugged, which Mandi uses to humiliate Jo. Jo later learns that Tyler is Mandi's stepbrother. Mandi escalates the prank war, first trying to sabotage her chances to get into Carnegie Mellon, then using artificial sweetener and coffee to ruin one of Jo's father's engines.

Jo confronts Mandi about going too far, only to learn she is focused on her narrow goal of being on top. So, when Jo and Abby realize she is about to throw her birthday party, Jo throws a rival party for Abby; Abby's party is "all invited", whereas Mandi's is "invite only". The Plastics, seeing no one at Mandi's but hearing music at Abby's, puts ipecac on their pizza. Jo sees Hope paying for the pizza and notices it has a strange smell, before stashing it away. The Plastics are disappointed to see that no one at Abby's party is sick. Mandi's boyfriend Nick comments on the lack of food, prompting Jo give him a slice of the contaminated pizza. After Mandi kisses him, he vomits on her.

Jo, Abby, and Quinn, who had been helping them, start a new clique called the "Anti-Plastics" and play a series of pranks on Chastity and Hope. Jo campaigns against Mandi for Homecoming Queen, threatening Jo's relationship with Tyler as she's becoming like her nemesis.

Realizing what she's been doing is wrong, Jo tries to return the money to Abby's father. Mandi overhears this and gets Quinn to turn against her and write about the bribe in the school paper, which nearly puts Jo and Abby's friendship at a breaking point.

Mandi and Nick steal the homecoming court charity money, which is to be donated to an animal shelter. Nick plants it in Jo's shed while Mandi tips off to Principal Duvall. Jo gets expelled, but not before she finds Mandi and challenges her to a game of flag football. Mandi refuses until she realizes she must win to remain popular.

When Tyler and Abby learn from Quinn that Jo was likely framed, they rekindle their friendship with her and enlist the tech-savvy Elliott to prove Jo's innocence. Elliott finds video footages of Mandi and Nick planting the money and texts them to the whole student body. The Anti-Plastics beat the Plastics at flag football. As Mandi and Nick are arrested, Principal Duvall apologizes to Jo for the misunderstanding and allows her to graduate. At the homecoming dance, Abby and Elliott are crowned King and Queen while Jo and Tyler kiss.

Quinn takes over as leader of the Plastics. Mandi and Nick serve community service and are allowed to graduate, but lose their popularity. Jo and Abby attend Carnegie Mellon together while Tyler attends Penn State.

== Cast ==
- Meaghan Martin as Jo Mitchell, a tomboyish 18-year-old girl who shares an interest in cars with her father and must move schools at least 3 times a year because of his job.
  - Tatum Etheridge as Young Jo
- Maiara Walsh as Mandi Weatherly, a cruel, spoiled popular girl who views Abby as a rival and frequently bullies her & Jo
  - Anna Cate Donelan as Young Mandi
- Jennifer Stone as Abby Hanover, a kind but unpopular girl who comes from a rich background and is a rival of Mandi.
  - Angelica Alden as Young Abby
- Nicole Gale Anderson as Hope Plotkin, a hypochondriac who has a strong fear of germs and illness and Mandi's right-hand-girl.
- Claire Holt as Chastity Meyer, a ditzy girl who has multiple boyfriends and a "raging libido".
- Diego Boneta as Tyler Adams, a popular soccer player and Mandi's stepbrother who later dates Jo.
- Linden Ashby as Rod Mitchell, Jo's father and a mechanic.
- Rhoda Griffis as Ilene Hanover, the wealthy mother of Abby and wife of Sidney Hanover.
- Mike Pniewski as Mr. Giamatti, the school Shop teacher.
- Patrick Johnson as Nick "Big Z" Zimmer, Mandi's boyfriend and a former friend of Tyler.
- Colin Dennard as Elliott Gold, a nerdy boy obsessed with technology who is attracted to Abby.
- Tim Meadows as Principal Ron Duvall, the Principal of Northshore High who has had experience with the Plastics group before.
- Bethany Anne Lind as Quinn Shinn, a timid wannabe who is on the School Newspaper team.
- Donn Lamkin as Sidney Hanover, the wealthy father of Abby and husband of Ilene Hanover.

== Production ==
Mean Girls 2 is a sequel to the 2004 film Mean Girls, which was written by Tina Fey. Fey was asked by Paramount Pictures to write a sequel but turned the offer down. The film was first announced in 2008 as one of the multiple sequel projects planned by Paramount Famous. In June 2010, Melanie Mayron was announced as the director of the film. Fey revealed in an interview that she had no involvement with the film.

The film was shot in July 2010 over the course of 20 days at Sutton Middle School in Atlanta, Georgia.

== Promotion and release ==
The official trailer of the film was released on November 22, 2010. It premiered on ABC Family as a Mean Girls: Double Feature on January 23, 2011, with the 2004 film.

== Ratings ==
The film was TV's most-watched movie of the 2010–2011 season among viewers aged 12–34 and was especially popular with girls and women aged 12–34 (according to Variety). On its original air date, Mean Girls 2 "was cable’s most-watched program from 8 to 10 p.m. in all key demos and No. 2 in overall viewers (3.4 million)".

== Reception ==
Mean Girls 2 received negative reviews from critics. Hilary Busis of Entertainment Weekly called it a "thinly veiled, low-budget remake of the 2004 hit with which it shares a name".

Brian Orndorf gave the film a D+ grade and wrote that "Whatever problems I had with the 2004 feature aren't even an issue here, as the new film offers a decidedly more pedestrian take on the clique warfare concept, trading Fey's sly ambition for cruel DTV routine."

Sandie Angulo Chen of Common Sense Media gave the film 3 out of 5, writing: "Mildly amusing sequel follows same 'be yourself' storyline."

In an interview in 2020, Meaghan Martin said: "I wouldn't say Mean Girls 2 is the project I'm most proud of, it definitely has a lot of flaws, but I grew a lot during the filming process both personally and professionally and for that I’m super thankful."
