= Rhoda Griffis =

American actress (b. 1965)

- Born: January 9, 1965 (age 61); Raleigh, North Carolina, U.S.
- Occupation: Actress
- Years active: 1991—present
- Spouse: Jay Freer
- Website: rhodagriffis.com

Rhoda Griffis (born January 9, 1965) is an American actress who has played supporting roles both in independent and mainstream films and television.

== Life and career ==
Griffis appeared onstage in Angels in America, Proof, Collected Stories, and The Dark at the Top of the Stairs.

Her first film role was in the 1992 drama Love Field, in which she played Jacqueline Kennedy. Her non-stage acting debut was in the television movie A Mother's Right: The Elizabeth Morgan Story. She appeared in other made-for-TV films and series - including In the Heat of the Night.

Griffis worked for seven seasons with The North Carolina Shakespeare Festival, for five seasons with Charlotte Rep, as well as appearing with the Saint Louis Repertory, the Alabama Shakespeare Festival, and Theatre by the Sea (Portsmouth, NH). In Atlanta, Griffis has appeared frequently on stage with the Alliance Theatre, Theatrical Outfit, and for three seasons with the Actors Theatre of Atlanta.

Griffis is known for her work in Runaway Jury, Walk the Line, Road Trip, Songcatcher. Among her more recent roles is the feisty Lenore Baker in Lifetime's television drama, Army Wives. In addition, she made memorable appearances in American Summer and One Missed Call.

In between acting work, Griffis teaches on-camera acting, theatre, voice-overs and assistant directs in the fine arts department of The Lovett School in Atlanta, Georgia.

Griffis married director Jay Freer.

== Filmography ==
Film
Year	Title	Role	Notes
1992	Love Field	Jacqueline Kennedy	
1993	The Program	Reporter #3	
1994	Cobb	Amanda Chitwood Cobb	
1995	Something to Talk About	Edna	
1997	Midnight in the Garden of Good and Evil	Card Club Woman #2	
1999	The Rage: Carrie 2	Saleswoman	
1999	Chill Factor	Pregnant Woman	
2000	A Good Baby	Mother in Shack	
2000	Songcatcher	Clementine McFarland	
2000	Road Trip	Tour Group Mom	
2000	Doomsday Man	Mrs. Gloria Prentiss	
2001	Rustin	Lyla Griggs	
2002	Run Ronnie Run	TV Anchorwoman	
2002	New Best Friend	Attending Nurse	
2003	A Touch of Fate	Chippy Trick	
2003	Runaway Jury	Rikki Coleman	
2004	No Witness	Fiona Haskell	
2004	Bobby Jones: Stroke of Genius	Woman Hit in Leg	Uncredited
2004	The Lost Cause	Deena	Short film
2005	Black Oasis	Mom	Short film
2005	Our Very Own	Fanny	
2005	Walk the Line	Five and Dime Manager	
2005	Dreamer	Classroom Mother	
2005	The Unseen	Loretta	
2005	The Gospel	Lawyer #1	
2006	Big Momma's House 2	Mrs. Gallagher	
2006	Broken Bridges	Idalee	
2006	Secret of the Cave	Roy's Mom	
2006	We Are Marshall	Mrs. Shaw	
2008	One Missed Call	Marie Layton	
2008	The Loss of a Teardrop Diamond	Secretary	
2009	Year One	Eve	
2009	Road Trip: Beer Pong	Tour Group Mom	Direct-to-video
2009	The Blind Side	Beth	
2010	Father of Invention	Penny Camp	
2010	Blood Done Sign My Name	Isabel Taylor	
2010	The Last Song	Doctor	
2011	The Pool Boys	Nancy	
2012	The Hunger Games	Registration Woman	
2012	What to Expect When You're Expecting	Convention Organizer	
2012	The Odd Life of Timothy Green	Dr. Lesley Hunt	
2012	Flight	Amanda Anderson	
2012	Parental Guidance	Dr. Schveer	
2013	Plus One	Mrs. Howard	
2013	42	Miss Bishop	
2014	Kill the Messenger	Female Anchor	
2015	90 Minutes in Heaven	Mary	
2015	Magic Mike XXL	Julia	
2016	Miracles from Heaven	Church Lady	
2016	Hidden Figures	White Librarian	
2016	Masterminds	Real Estate Agent	
2017	The Yellow Birds	Sheryl	
2017	Guardians of the Galaxy Vol. 2	Sneeper Madame	
2018	Forever My Girl	Mrs. Grant	
2018	Blockers	Art Teacher	Uncredited
2018	I Can Only Imagine	Jen-Amy's Manager	
2019	The Best of Enemies	Whitney	
2019	Just Mercy	Judge Pamela Bachab	
2020	The Banker	Mrs. Barker	
2020	Electric Jesus	Donna	
2021	Charming the Hearts of Men	Mrs. Lotts	
2024	Lilly	Marcia Greenberger	

Television
Year	Title	Role	Notes
1991	In the Heat of the Night	The Secretary	Episode: "The More Things Change"
1992	A Mother's Right: The Elizabeth Morgan Story	Sharon	TV movie
1993	The Conviction of Kitty Dodds	Dina	TV movie
1993	A Family Torn Apart	Liz Kelley	TV movie
1993	Scattered Dreams	Mrs. Virgil	TV movie
1994	On Promised Land	Ellen Appletree	TV movie
1994	One of Her Own	Lynn Wickstrom	TV movie
1994	Matlock	Jane Kravitz; Linda Kirsch	Episode: "The Murder Game"; Episode: "The Tabloid"
1995	Big Dreams & Broken Hearts: The Dottie West Story	Diane Marsh	TV movie
1995	The Sister-in-Law	Kelly Richards	TV movie
1995	The Client	Female Reporter	Episode: "Pilot"
1996	A Season in Purgatory	Maid (uncredited)	TV movie
1996	To Love, Honor and Deceive	Mother at House	TV movie
1997	Close to Danger	Lucille	TV movie
1997	Perfect Crime	Gia	TV movie
1998	From the Earth to the Moon	Martha Chaffee	Episode: "Apollo One"
1998	Mama Flora's Family	Mrs. Hopkins (Younger Woman)	TV movie
1998	The Tempest	Sophie Dupree	TV movie
1999	Dawson's Creek	Dr. Marlee Summer	Episode: "Be Careful What You Wish For"; Episode: "Reunited"
1999	The Hunley	Young Lady	TV movie
1999	The Price of a Broken Heart	Katie	TV movie
2002	Jo	Girlfriend	TV movie
2002	The Locket	Aunt May	TV movie
2003	One Tree Hill	Rachel	Episode: "Are You True?"
2004	The Madam's Family: The Truth About the Canal Street Brothel	Leigh	TV movie
2005	Odd Girl Out	Denise Larson	TV movie
2005	Palmetto Pointe	Guidance Counselor	Episode: "Off to the Pointe"
2005	Snow Wonder	Jane	TV movie
2006	Surface	Annie Boertz	Episode: "1.13"
2006	For One Night	Ginny Stephens	TV movie
2007	Girl, Positive	Karen Sandler	TV movie
2007	K-Ville	Cora Dunlevy	Episode: "Cobb's Webb"
2007-2010	Army Wives	Lenore Baker Ludwig	11 episodes
2008	Fab Five: The Texas Cheerleader Scandal	Pamela Blackburn	TV movie
2008	Living Proof	Bindy Blake	TV movie
2009	Eastbound & Down	The Teacher	Episode: "Chapter 2"
2009	Solving Charlie	Rose	TV movie
2009	My Fake Fiancé	Val	TV movie
2009-2014	Drop Dead Diva	Paula Dewey	Recurring role
2010	Tough Trade	Lucy	TV movie
2010	The Wronged Man	Tina	TV movie
2010	Past Life	Barb Stafford	Episode: "Soul Music"
2010	Memphis Beat	Elizabeth Hatcher	Episode: "Love Her Tender"
2011	Hail Mary	Principal Gertrude Teague	TV movie
2011	Mean Girls 2	Ilene Hanover	TV movie
2011	Teen Spirit	Vesper Summers	TV movie
2011	Single Ladies	Jane Sherrod	Episode: "Is This the End?"
2011	Level Up	Barbara	TV movie
2013	Nashville	Jane Rawlins	Episode: "Dear Brother"
2014	Satisfaction	Candice	6 episodes
2016	Confirmation	Judith Resnik	Television movie
2017	Shots Fired	Doreen Platt	Episode: "Hour Seven: Content of Their Character"
2017	Daytime Divas	Brooke Chandler	2 episodes
2017	Manhunt: Unabomber	Beth Ackerman	Episode: "Publish or Perish"
2017	Mindhunter	Esther Mayweather	1 episode
2018, 2021	Fear the Walking Dead	Vivian	5 episodes
2022	Ozark	Judge Mayhew	2 episodes
