= Band camp =

Summer camp for marching band players

A band camp typically refers to a high school, college, or university marching band summer camp. Band camp is often mandatory for members of the band and constitutes the majority of the preparation a marching band makes before its marching season (learning how to march, learning "sets" on the field, memorizing show songs). A high school marching band may travel to a college or university for band camp for use of its facilities (dormitories, fieldhouses, fields) and services, it may stay at the school, or go to a close by camp/retreat area. The time at band camp is used for focused rehearsals and time for bonding between band members. The auxiliary also learns and rehearses with the marching band.

Band camp is also used for more administrative purposes, such as fitting members for uniforms, giving information for the school’s other musical groups, finalizing the schedule of events for that school year, including football games, competitions, and other performances, as well as finalizing information for any trips the band may go on during the school year, including information about transportation, hotel or other accommodations, and events while the trip is going on.

Band camp might also be used to refer to an individual camp where participants focus on developing their own musical skill, in which case it would more likely be called a music camp.

== In popular culture ==
As marching band is a largely co-educational activity, and many such camps are overnight affairs with inadequate adult supervision, band camps have become infamous in popular culture for being the occasion of large amounts of sexual activity among the participants. The 1999 film American Pie makes extensive reference to this aspect of band camp, and a direct-to-DVD spin-off called American Pie Presents: Band Camp explores this subject in more detail.
