= I'm Reed Fish =

- Movie poster for I'm Reed Fish
- Directed by: Zackary Adler
- Written by: Reed Fish; Zackary Adler (story); Bader Alwazzan (story); Rhett Wickham (story)
- Produced by: Bader Alwazzan
- Starring: Jay Baruchel; Alexis Bledel; Schuyler Fisk; Shiri Appleby; DJ Qualls; Chris Parnell; Katey Sagal
- Cinematography: Doug Chamberlain
- Music by: Roddy Bottum
- Distributed by: Screen Media Films
- Release dates: April 25, 2006 (Tribeca Film Festival); June 1, 2007 (United States)
- Running time: 93 minutes
- Country: United States
- Language: English

I'm Reed Fish is a 2006 American romantic comedy film based on a story by Reed Fish. It was first released on April 25, 2006 at the Tribeca Film Festival, then released theatrically on June 1, 2007, and on DVD on September 4, 2007. The film was directed by Zackary Adler and stars Alexis Bledel, Jay Baruchel, and Schuyler Fisk. Baruchel won the Best Actor award at the U.S. Comedy Arts Festival in 2007 for his role of Reed Fish.

== Plot ==
Reed Fish has followed in the footsteps of his late father, doing an early-morning radio show with the town's mayor, Maureen, through which the eccentric locals of Mud Meadows voice their complaints and have them addressed. Reed produces the show with his old high school buddy, Frank, and he's engaged to be married to another high school classmate, Kate Peterson, whose dad owns several businesses in town. Reed's plans are upended when his high school sweetheart, Jill, comes back to town. She's supposed to be away at law school, but confides to Reed that she quit school two years earlier, and has been working as a waitress while she fruitlessly pursues a career in music. Reed encourages her to play on Open Mike Night at the local bar. He inspires her to find her voice, which leads to some complications in his relationship with Kate, forcing Reed to reexamine every aspect of his safe, secure life.

== Cast ==
- Jay Baruchel as Reed Fish
- Alexis Bledel as Kate
- Schuyler Fisk as Jill
- Victor Rasuk as Frank Cortez
- DJ Qualls as Andrew
- A. J. Cook as Theresa
- Katey Sagal as Maureen
- Chris Parnell as Ralph
- Shiri Appleby as Jill Cavanaugh
- Valerie Azlynn as Kate Peterson
- Blake Clark as Irv
- Reed Fish as John Penner

== Reception ==
Variety described the film as a "Charming, rural version of a pre-wedding panic...flawlessly in tune to small-town rhythms. Pitch-perfect dialogue, quietly dynamic helming and small-scale action on a widescreen canvas make for a very appealing film." The New York Times called the film "a rural coming-of-age tale that's so laid-back that its cast is almost horizontal." In a 2010 interview, performer Reggie Watts said that he "loved it", describing it as "kind of a like a Ferris Bueller's in the woods."

On Rotten Tomatoes, the film has an approval rating of 52% based on 21 reviews, with an average rating of 5.12/10. The site's critics consensus reads: "Painless if largely unmemorable, I'm Reed Fish fails to distinguish itself from countless other small-town comedies populated by amiably quirky characters." On Metacritic, the film has a score of 36% based on reviews from 8 critics.
