= Without a Paddle: Nature's Calling =

- DVD cover art
- Directed by: Ellory Elkayem
- Written by: Stephen Mazur
- Produced by: Amy Goldberg
- Starring: Oliver James; Kristopher Turner; Rik Young
- Cinematography: Thomas L. Callaway
- Edited by: John Gilbert
- Music by: Thomas Chase
- Production companies: Paramount Famous Productions; De Line Pictures
- Distributed by: Paramount Home Entertainment
- Release date: January 13, 2009
- Running time: 87 minutes
- Country: United States
- Language: English
- Box office: $4.4 million (DVD rentals)

Without a Paddle: Nature's Calling is a 2009 American adventure comedy film directed by Ellory Elkayem, written by Stephen Mazur, and is a standalone sequel to the 2004 film Without a Paddle. Aside from the theme of three men on a river adventure to find something, there is little connection to the first film. None of the original actors return. It was released on DVD on January 13, 2009 by Paramount Famous Productions.

== Plot ==
Ben and Zach are childhood friends who reunite years later to take part in an unusual quest that involves traveling into the woods in search of Ben's high school sweetheart. They are joined by their British rival Nigel, and as the stakes get higher and the squirrels turn hostile, the hapless trio attempts to navigate a raging river while realizing that sometimes nature isn't all it's cracked up to be.

== Cast ==
- Oliver James as Ben Reed
  - Cory Bossom as Young Ben Reed
- Kristopher Turner as Zach Howell
- Rik Young as Nigel
- Madison Riley as Heather "Earthchild" Bessler
- Ellen Albertini Dow as Mrs. Bessler
- Amber McDonald as Thunderstorm
- Jerry Rice as Hal Gore
- Robert Blanche as Massey
- Todd Robinson as Overton

== Reception ==
Entertainment Weekly called it "the most unnecessary sequel ever".

Ryan Keer of DVD Talk gave it half a star out of 5, and recommend viewers "Skip It".
