= Paramount Famous Productions =

Made-for-home entertainment division of Paramount Pictures

- Type: Division
- Industry: Home Entertainment
- Founded: February 2007; 19 years ago
- Defunct: January 23, 2011; 15 years ago
- Fate: Closed
- Headquarters: Hollywood, California, United States
- Area served: Worldwide
- Key people: Louis Feola (President)
- Products: Motion pictures
- Owner: National Amusements
- Parent: Paramount Pictures (Viacom)
- Website: www.paramount.com

Paramount Famous Productions, Inc. was a made-for-home entertainment division of Paramount Pictures. It primarily developed home entertainment sequels to films from Paramount Pictures, DreamWorks Pictures (pre-2005 library), and other Paramount-related properties. The company's name also revived the Famous moniker previously used by the Paramount-owned Famous Studios.

== History ==
In February 2007, Paramount Pictures named Louis Feola president of its new direct-to-DVD division. The initial division plan called for $10 million maximum cost films being released four to six times a year working with Paramount Worldwide Home Entertainment. All but Columbia Pictures had a direct-to-video unit at this time. Feola indicated that direct-to-video faces competition from popular TV shows, but it takes the place of the decreasing sale from older library titles. DTV in an up year can bring in "hundreds of millions of dollars in revenue".

With the completion of principal photography on its first feature length sequel, Without a Paddle: Nature's Calling in August 2008, Paramount announced a name for the division: Paramount Famous Productions. Spin-offs of Road Trip, Bad News Bears, The Naked Gun, Mean Girls, and Grease were announced to be in development at that time, and three executives were appointed. The division expected to be releasing a full slate starting in 2010. Paramount Famous Productions was quietly closed in 2011, after the release of Mean Girls 2.

== Films ==
Title	Release date
Without a Paddle: Nature's Calling	January 13, 2009
Van Wilder: Freshman Year	July 14, 2009
Road Trip: Beer Pong	August 11, 2009
Wrong Turn at Tahoe	January 12, 2010
Schuks Tshabalala's Survival Guide to South Africa	May 28, 2010
The Romantics	September 10, 2010
Mean Girls 2	January 23, 2011
