= DJ Qualls =

American actor (born 1978)

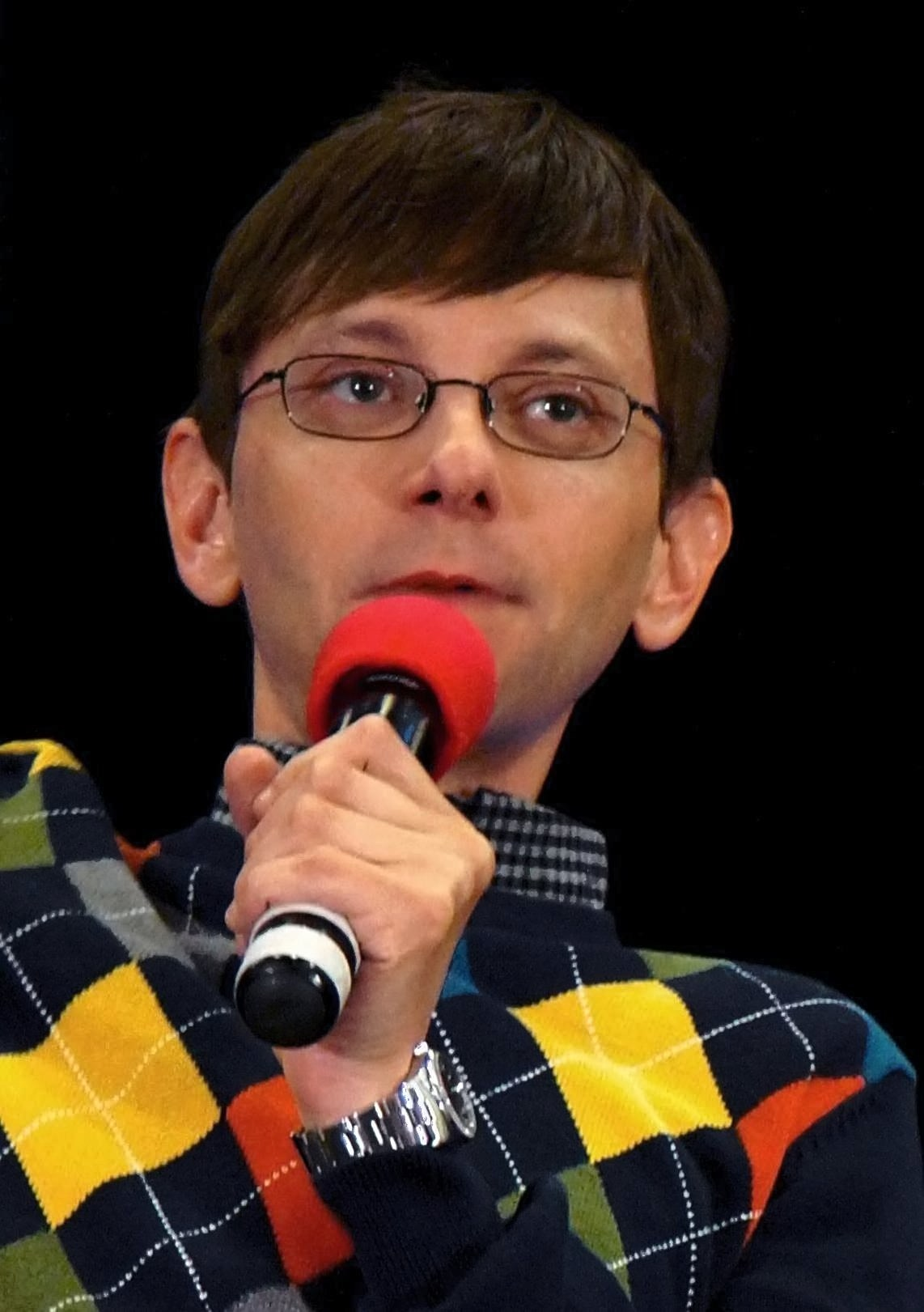
- Qualls in 2014
- Born: Donald Joseph Qualls; June 10, 1978 (age 48); Nashville, Tennessee, U.S.
- Occupation: Actor
- Years active: 1994–present

Donald Joseph Qualls (born June 10, 1978) is an American actor. He is best known for his television roles as Citizen Z on the Syfy horror series Z Nation (2014–2018) and Ed McCarthy on the Amazon Prime Video series The Man in the High Castle (2015–2018).

Qualls gained mainstream recognition after a supporting role in the sex comedy film Road Trip (2000), which he reprised in the sequel, Road Trip: Beer Pong (2009). This was followed with a lead role in the teen comedy film The New Guy (2002), alongside starring roles in The Core (2003) and Hustle & Flow (2005), the latter of which earned him a Screen Actors Guild Award nomination. Qualls has also had starring roles in the films I'm Reed Fish (2006), Delta Farce (2007), Amigo (2010), Small Apartments (2013), and Buster's Mal Heart (2016).

Qualls had main roles as Police Officer Davey Sutton on the TNT crime series Memphis Beat (2010–2011) and Billy Nugent on the FX and FXX sitcom Legit (2013–2014).

== Early life ==
Qualls was born in Nashville, Tennessee, one of five children of Donnie and Janice Qualls. He was raised in Manchester, Tennessee, and attended school in nearby Tullahoma. He was diagnosed with Hodgkin's lymphoma at age fourteen. After two years of treatment, his cancer was said to be in remission. According to Qualls, the chemotherapy at an early age sped up his metabolism and affected his growth, "It stopped my development," which explains his slender frame. After graduating from Coffee County Central High School in 1995, where he was an active member in the Red Raider Band, Qualls attended King's College London, where he studied English literature. He returned to Tennessee, enrolling at Belmont University in Nashville, where he also began acting in a local theater company.

== Career ==
Qualls was an extra in the 1994 HBO film Against the Wall. He landed the small role of Jason in the miniseries Mama Flora's Family (1998) while participating in community theater. After auditioning for a one-liner in Road Trip (2000), he was asked to come from the Atlanta office to meet producer Ivan Reitman in California. He debuted in Road Trip as shy virgin Kyle Edwards, and reprised his role in the sequel, Road Trip: Beer Pong (2009). After this, he worked as a model for Prada and photographers such as David LaChapelle and Steve Klein. In Cherry Falls (2000), he played Wally, another virgin. In 2001, he played Neil Lawrence in Chasing Holden.

Qualls appeared in a cameo in Britney Spears' music video "Boys" (2002) and was also in the "I'm Just a Kid" music video by Simple Plan (2002). In 2002 and 2003, Qualls played Archie in the film Comic Book Villains, Andrew in the film Big Trouble, Junior in the film Lone Star State of Mind, Dizzy Gillespie Harrison in the film The New Guy, and Rat in the sci-fi film The Core. In 2005, he appeared as Shelby in the film Hustle & Flow. In 2006, he starred in romantic film I'm Reed Fish. In 2007, he starred in the comedy Delta Farce. He also had roles in the films Amigo (2010) and Small Apartments (2013). His television work includes eccentric hunter Garth Fitzgerald IV on Supernatural and appearances on Monk, Scrubs, Criminal Minds, Lost, Law & Order: Criminal Intent, CSI: Crime Scene Investigation, Numb3rs, My Name Is Earl, Breaking Bad, and The Big Bang Theory.

Qualls starred in the Paramount Pictures web series Circle of Eight (2009). From 2010–2011, he starred as Police Officer Davey Sutton on the TNT crime series Memphis Beat. From 2013-2014, Qualls co-starred on the FX and FXX television series Legit as Billy Nugent, a 33-year-old man with muscular dystrophy. From 2014–2018, he portrayed Citizen Z in the Syfy horror series Z Nation, and from 2015–2018, he played Ed McCarthy in the Amazon Prime Video series The Man in the High Castle. Qualls also appeared as a Y2K prophet opposite Rami Malek in the sci-fi mystery thriller Buster's Mal Heart (2016).

== Personal life ==
In January 2020, Qualls came out as gay on his Twitter account, stating he was "tired of worrying about what it would do to my career," after announcing it at a Jim Jefferies show in San Diego. Prior to this, he had referenced his sexuality on The Late Late Show with Craig Ferguson in the early 2010s.

Qualls revealed in May 2024 that he is currently in a relationship with fellow Supernatural actor Ty Olsson, and that the two are engaged to be married.

== Filmography ==
=== Film ===
Year	Title	Role	Notes
1999	Cherry Falls	Wally	
2000	Road Trip	Kyle Edwards	
2001	Chasing Holden	Neil Lawrence	
2002	Comic Book Villains	Archie	Co-producer
2002	Big Trouble	Andrew	
2002	Lone Star State of Mind	Junior	
2002	The New Guy	Dizzy Gillespie Harrison / Gil Harris	
2003	The Core	Theodore Donald "Rat" Finch	
2005	Hustle & Flow	Shelby	
2005	Little Athens	Cory	
2006	I'm Reed Fish	Andrew	
2007	Delta Farce	Private Everett Shackleford	
2008	Familiar Strangers	Kenny Worthington	
2008	The Company Man	Guy	Short film
2009	Road Trip: Beer Pong	Kyle Edwards	
2009	All About Steve	Howard	
2009	Circle of Eight	Randall	
2010	Last Day of Summer	Joe	Executive producer
2010	Amigo	Zeke	
2011	Running Mates	Graham "One Ball" Jones	
2011	21 & Over	Counselor	
2013	Small Apartments	Artie	
2013	Pawn Shop Chronicles	JJ	
2016	November Rule	Kareem	
2016	Buster's Mal Heart	Brown/Last Free Man	
2017	Silence Please!	Douglas	Short film
2018	Fifty Minutes	Mr. Potter	Short film
2024	Carved	Bill	
2025	The Napa Boys	The Sommelier	
TBA	1780		Post-production

=== Television ===
Year	Title	Role	Notes
1998	Mama Flora's Family	Jason	2 episodes
2002	Scrubs	Josh	Episode: "My Student"
2005	Lost	Johnny	Episode: "Everybody Hates Hugo"
2005	Law & Order: Criminal Intent	Robie Boatman	Episode: "Scared Crazy"
2005	Criminal Minds	Richard Slessman	Episode: "Extreme Aggressor"
2005	Punk'd	Himself	Season 6, Episode 7
2006	Monk	Rufus / Computer Geek	Episode: "Mr. Monk and the Big Reward"
2006	CSI: Crime Scene Investigation	Henry Garden	Episode: "Post-Mortem"
2007	Numb3rs	Anthony Braxton	Episode: "Primacy"
2007	My Name Is Earl	Ray-Ray	3 episodes
2007	The Big Bang Theory	Toby Loobenfeld	Episode: "The Loobenfeld Decay"
2008	Good Behavior	Donnie Stryker	Television film
2009	Breaking Bad	Getz	Episode: "Better Call Saul"
2010	Memphis Beat	Davey Sutton	20 episodes
2011–2020	Supernatural	Garth Fitzgerald IV/Mr. Fizzles	6 episodes
2013	Hawaii Five-0	Marshall Demps	Episode: "Kupouli 'la"
2013	Perception	Agent Rudy Fleckner	5 episodes
2013–2014	Legit	Billy Nugent	Main character (26 episodes)
2014–2018	Z Nation	Citizen Z	Series regular, 28 episodes
2015–2018	The Man in the High Castle	Ed McCarthy	Series regular, 30 episodes
2016	Time Traveling Bong	Future Man	2 episodes
2016	Hollywood Medium with Tyler Henry	Himself	1 episodes
2017	Fargo	Golem	2 episodes
2019	Creepshow	Clark Willson	1 episode
2022	Guillermo del Toro's Cabinet of Curiosities	Jenkins Brown (voice role)	1 episode
2023; 2025	Bookie	Alan	3 episodes

=== Music videos ===
Year	Artist	Title	Role	Notes
2000	Eels	"Mr. E's Beautiful Blues"	Kyle Edwards	Uncredited
2002	Simple Plan	"I'm Just a Kid"	Dizzy Gillespie Harrison / Gil Harris	Uncredited
2002	Britney Spears	"Boys"		

== Awards and nominations ==
Year	Award	Category	Nominated work	Result
2006	12th Screen Actors Guild Awards	Outstanding Performance by a Cast in a Motion Picture (shared with the cast)	Hustle & Flow	Nominated
