= ACME Film =

Film distributor in the Baltic states

Acme Film is a film distributor founded in 1999, which operates in Baltic states. In 2004, the company started operating in Latvia and in 2008 in Estonia.
