= Road Trip (2000 film) =

American comedy film by Todd Phillips

- Theatrical release poster
- Directed by: Todd Phillips
- Written by: Todd Phillips; Scot Armstrong
- Produced by: Daniel Goldberg; Joe Medjuck
- Starring: Breckin Meyer; Seann William Scott; Amy Smart; Rachel Blanchard; Fred Ward; Tom Green
- Cinematography: Mark Irwin
- Edited by: Sheldon Kahn; Peter Teschner
- Music by: Mike Simpson
- Production companies: DreamWorks Pictures; The Montecito Picture Company
- Distributed by: DreamWorks Pictures (through DreamWorks Distribution LLC; United States and Canada); United International Pictures (International)
- Release date: May 19, 2000
- Running time: 94 minutes
- Country: United States
- Language: English
- Budget: $16 million
- Box office: $119.8 million

Road Trip is a 2000 American road sex comedy film directed by Todd Phillips in his directorial debut and written by Scot Armstrong and Phillips. The film stars Breckin Meyer, Seann William Scott, Paulo Costanzo, and DJ Qualls, with Amy Smart, Tom Green, Rachel Blanchard, and Fred Ward in supporting roles. The film follows Josh Parker (Meyer), who enlists three of his college friends to embark on an 1,800-mile (2,900 km) road trip to retrieve an illicit tape mistakenly mailed to his girlfriend, Tiffany (Blanchard).

Released theatrically by DreamWorks Pictures on May 19, 2000, Road Trip received mixed reviews from critics, but was a box office success, grossing $119.8 million worldwide on a $16 million budget. The film has gathered a cult following over the years.

== Plot ==
Josh Parker and Tiffany Henderson are childhood friends turned high-school sweethearts, who try for a long-distance relationship as he goes to the University of Ithaca and she goes to the University of Austin. Josh becomes insecure when he cannot regularly reach Tiffany by phone. Fearing infidelity, he begins sending her videotaped messages.

Josh asks his friend and roommate, Rubin, to mail his latest tape to Tiffany before leaving for his Ancient Philosophy class. Josh's Ancient Philosophy professor tells him he needs a B+ on his midterm to pass the class. Josh's best friend, E.L., convinces Josh to stop worrying about Tiffany and notice the beautiful Beth Wagner.

Beth is in love with Josh, much to the chagrin of Jacob, the self-absorbed ancient philosophy T.A. who is obsessed with her. Later, E.L. throws a party where he auctions off several female students, including Beth. Scared of Jacob, she convinces Josh to outbid him. He and Beth escape to his room and record themselves having sex on his camcorder.

The next morning, Josh tells his friends that he slept with Beth and recorded it. They immediately play his camcorder tape, expecting to see them having sex, only to find love letters and songs performed for Tiffany. Josh believes that Rubin mailed the sex tape to Tiffany. He then hears a voicemail from Tiffany saying that she has not called due to the death of her grandfather. With E.L. and Rubin, Josh asks shy loner Kyle to tag along on a road trip to Austin, as they need his car, owned by Kyle's strict father, Earl.

After leaving the interstate in Bedford for what they thought was a "shortcut", they find a small bridge collapsed, realizing they will waste five hours backtracking. So, E.L. and Rubin convince them to jump the gap. Kyle objects, but they proceed. They make it across, but the car is wrecked, destroying Josh's philosophy textbooks.

The group continue on foot, stopping at a motel. Rubin tries to buy marijuana from the unsympathetic motel clerk, but is informed that Kyle's credit card is maxed out. Looking for transportation, E.L. persuades blind woman Brenda, at a school for the blind, into letting him take a bus for 'repairs', and they resume the journey. The group spends the night at a fraternity house, where Kyle loses his virginity to Rhonda, an African-American college student.

After a series of misadventures, the group finally gets to Austin and Tiffany's dorm. Josh intercepts the tape, just as she arrives. Earl also bursts in, furious over the car and the credit card, threatening to drag Kyle back with him. Kyle finally stands up to him, stating that he is going back to school with his friends. Earl assaults him, and a mini-riot ensues.

Josh and Tiffany retreat to talk, then Beth calls to warn him about his midterm. While he talks on the phone, Tiffany starts to watch the tape, which Barry recorded over. She and Josh realize their lives are going in different directions and amicably break up. The group returns to Ithaca just in time for Josh to take his midterm – with a little help from Beth, who called in a bomb threat to delay the start of the exam.

Josh passes the philosophy course and begins a relationship with Beth (happily making videos); Jacob eventually dies as a result of leading a cult staging a mass suicide, which no one but he carried out; Rubin becomes a successful marijuana cultivator; E.L., inspired by his sperm donation, begins dating a pre-med student; and Kyle starts dating Rhonda and reconciles with Earl.

== Cast ==
- Breckin Meyer as Josh Parker, Tiffany's long-distance boyfriend who is also romantically involved with Beth
- Seann William Scott as E.L. Faldt, an academically dismissive womanizer and Josh's best friend
- Paulo Costanzo as Rubin Carver, a genius stoner and the straight man of the group
- DJ Qualls as Kyle Edwards, a socially awkward nerd who is under heavy pressure from his father
- Amy Smart as Beth Wagner, who is romantically involved with Josh
- Rachel Blanchard as Tiffany Henderson, Josh's long-distance girlfriend
- Tom Green as Barry Manilow, the college tour guide and narrator of the film
- Anthony Rapp as Jacob Schultz
- Fred Ward as Earl Edwards, Kyle's father
- Andy Dick as Motel Clerk
- Ethan Suplee as Ed Bradford
- Jaclyn DeSantis as Heather
- Jessica Cauffiel as Wrong Tiffany Henderson
- Omar J. Dorsey as Lawrence
- Mia Amber Davis as Rhonda
- Mary Lynn Rajskub as Blind Brenda
- Kohl Sudduth as Mark
- Wendell B. Harris Jr. as Professor Anderson
- Rini Bell as Carla, Tiffany's roommate
- Edmund Lyndeck as Jack Manilow, Barry's grandfather
- Ellen Albertini Dow as Mrs. Manilow, Barry's grandmother
- Horatio Sanz as French Toast Guy
- Rhoda Griffis as Tour Group Mom
- Jimmy Kimmel as Corky the dog (voice)
- Todd Phillips as Clayton
- Marla Sucharetza as Sperm Bank Nurse

== Production ==
The fictional 'University of Ithaca' is based on both Ithaca College and Cornell University, each located in Ithaca, New York. Filming took place from October 16, 1999, to December 27, 1999, on the campuses of Woodward Academy, Georgia Tech, Emory University, and the University of Georgia. The university seen in a flyover in the opening scene is actually Harvard University; the same footage was later used in the 2003 DreamWorks release Old School. The diner scene was shot in Lawrenceville, Georgia at the Gwinnett Diner, as it says on the coffee mugs. One of the final scenes of the tour was filmed at Founders Park at the University of Southern California.

Crispin Glover was initially cast as Jacob, but after one day of filming, the role was recast with Anthony Rapp.

== Reception ==
=== Box office ===
The film opened on May 19, 2000, alongside Dinosaur and Small Time Crooks. It was ranked No. 3 at the North American box office behind Gladiator and Dinosaur, making US$15,484,004, in its opening weekend.

=== Critical reception ===
Review aggregation website Rotten Tomatoes gives Road Trip an approval rating of 59% based on 97 reviews, with an average rating of 5.4/10. The site's critics consensus reads: "Some humor is hit or miss, depending on the audience tastes, but the movie is funny overall. Mixed reviews for the cast, especially for MTV's Tom Green." Metacritic assigned the film a weighted average score of 55 out of 100 based on 32 critics, indicating "mixed or average reviews".

At the 2000 Stinkers Bad Movie Awards, Green won both Worst Supporting Actor and Most Unfunny Comic Relief for his role in both this film and Charlie's Angels. The film itself also received a nomination for Oldest Looking Teenagers, but lost to Remember the Titans.

In an article by Rotten Tomatoes, it ranked Road Trip as the 79th best film of 2000, based on its score on their website. This ranking took into account audience scores for the films on the list, in addition to critic scores.

=== Accolades ===
Year	Award	Category	Recipients	Result
2000	Bogey Awards	Bogey Award	Road Trip	Won
2000	Teen Choice Awards	Choice Movie Comedy	Road Trip	Nominated
2000	Teen Choice Awards	Choice Movie Liar	Tom Green	Won
2000	Teen Choice Awards	Choice Movie Sleazebag	Andy Dick	Nominated
2000	Teen Choice Awards	Choice Movie Chemistry	Amy Smart, Breckin Meyer	Nominated
2000	Stinkers Bad Movie Awards	Worst Supporting Actor	Tom Green	Won
2000	Stinkers Bad Movie Awards	Most Unfunny Comic Relief	Tom Green	Won
2001	Blockbuster Entertainment Awards	Favorite Supporting Actor – Comedy	Tom Green	Nominated
2001	MTV Movie & TV Awards	Best Comedic Performance	Tom Green	Nominated
2001	MTV Movie & TV Awards	Breakthrough Male Performance	Tom Green	Nominated
2001	MTV Movie & TV Awards	Best Cameo in a Movie	Andy Dick	Nominated
2001	MTV Movie & TV Awards	Best Music Moment	"I Wanna Rock" bus scene	Nominated
2001	Golden Trailer Awards	Best Comedy	Road Trip	Nominated

== Home media ==
The film's R-rated and unrated cuts were released on DVD and VHS by DreamWorks Home Entertainment in December 2000. The unrated cut featured stronger nudity, including additional shots of bare-naked breasts, as well as shots of women's bare vaginas. In February 2006, Viacom (now known as Paramount Skydance) acquired the rights to Road Trip and all 58 other live-action films DreamWorks had released since 1997, following its $1.6 billion-dollar acquisition of the company's live-action assets. The deal included the rights to the film's successor EuroTrip, another live-action DreamWorks release. Paramount Home Entertainment subsequently released Road Trip on Blu-ray on May 12, 2012. Kino Lorber were later sublicensed the home video rights for a 4K UHD edition of the film, which was released on June 24, 2025. This release included the film's R-rated cut and unrated cut, with the unrated cut having a new Blu-ray master by Paramount Pictures.

The film was made available on Paramount's subscription streaming service Paramount+, which launched in 2021, in addition to being made available on their free streaming service Pluto TV.

== Related film and sequel ==
A related film, titled EuroTrip, was released on February 20, 2004. The film was originally titled Ugly Americans and is considered the film's spiritual successor. Before being released, it had its title changed by DreamWorks to be similar to Road Trip, since they wanted to capitalize on the film's success. However, the film received mixed reviews and ultimately flopped at the box office.

Road Trip: Beer Pong, a direct-to-video sequel to the 2000 film. It was released on August 11, 2009, by Paramount Famous Productions. Only two of the original cast or crew appear in the sequel film, DJ Qualls as Kyle Edwards and Rhoda Griffis as Tour Group Mom.
