= Steve Rash =

American film director and producer

- Occupations: Film director, film producer

Steve Rash is an American film director and producer best known for directing such films as Son in Law, The Buddy Holly Story, Can't Buy Me Love, Under the Rainbow, Queens Logic, Bring It On: All or Nothing, and Bring It On: In It to Win It.
