= American Pie Presents (film series) =

Series of American films, 2005–2020

- Created by: Universal Studios Home Entertainment
- Based on: American Pie by Adam Herz

Films and television
- Films: American Pie Presents: Band Camp (2005); American Pie Presents: The Naked Mile (2006); American Pie Presents: Beta House (2007); American Pie Presents: The Book of Love (2009); American Pie Presents: Girls' Rules (2020)

American Pie Presents is a spin-off film series of the American Pie franchise. The series consists of five films: American Pie Presents: Band Camp (2005), American Pie Presents: The Naked Mile (2006), American Pie Presents: Beta House (2007), American Pie Presents: The Book of Love (2009), and American Pie Presents: Girls' Rules (2020), all of which went direct-to-video. Noah Levenstein (Eugene Levy), a character in the original series, appears in all films with the exception of Girls' Rules.

== Films ==
=== Band Camp (2005) ===
Matt Stifler wants to be just like his big brother, making porn movies and having a good time in college. After sabotaging the school band, he gets sent to band camp where he really does not like it at first but then learns how to deal with the people there.

=== The Naked Mile (2006) ===
When Erik Stifler gets a free pass to do whatever he wants from his girlfriend, he and his two best friends, Ryan and Cooze, head to see his cousin Dwight for the Naked Mile and a weekend they will never forget.

=== Beta House (2007) ===
Erik and Cooze start college and pledge the Beta House fraternity, presided over by none other than legendary Dwight Stifler. But chaos ensues when a fraternity of geeks threatens to stop the debauchery and the Betas have to make a stand for their right to party.

=== The Book of Love (2009) ===
Three new hapless virgins discover the "Bible" (a sex manual) hidden in the school library at East Great Falls High. Unfortunately for them, the book is ruined, and with incomplete advice, the Bible leads them on a journey to lose their virginity.

=== Girls' Rules (2020) ===
Seniors Annie, Kayla, Michelle, and Stephanie work together to get what they want on their last year of high school.

== Cast ==
Key
- A dark gray cell indicates the character was not in the film.

Characters	Films				
Characters	American Pie Presents: Band Camp	American Pie Presents: The Naked Mile	American Pie Presents: Beta House	American Pie Presents: The Book of Love	American Pie Presents: Girls' Rules
Characters	2005	2006	2007	2009	2020
Noah Levenstein	Eugene Levy	Eugene Levy	Eugene Levy	Eugene Levy	
Matt Stifler	Tad Hilgenbrink				
Elyse Houston	Arielle Kebbel				
Chloe	Crystle Lightning				
James "Jimmy" Chong	Jun Hee Lee				
Ernie Kaplowitz	Jason Earles				
Oscar	Omar Benson Miller				
Chuck Sherman	Chris Owen				
Erik Stifler		John White	John White		
Dwight Stifler		Steve Talley	Steve Talley		
Harry Stifler		Christopher McDonald	Christopher McDonald		
Mike "Cooze" Coozemen		Jake Siegel	Jake Siegel		
Bull		Dan Petronijevic	Dan Petronijevic		
Jill		Jaclyn A. Smith	Jaclyn A. Smith		
Rock		Jordan Prentice	Jordan Prentice		
Ryan Grimm		Ross Thomas			
Tracy Sterling		Jessy Schram			
Ashley Thomas			Meghan Heffern		
Rob Shearson				Bug Hall	
Scott Stifler				John Patrick Jordan	
Nathan Jenkyll				Kevin M. Horton	
Marshall "Lube" Lubetsky				Brandon Hardesty	
Heidi				Beth Behrs	
Dana				Melanie Papalia	
Ashley Lawrence				Jennifer Holland	
Madeline Shearson				Rosanna Arquette	
Annie Watson					Madison Pettis
Stephanie Stifler					Lizze Broadway
Kayla					Piper Curda
Michelle					Natasha Behnam

== Crew ==
Crew/detail	Films				
Crew/detail	American Pie Presents: Band Camp	American Pie Presents: The Naked Mile	American Pie Presents: Beta House	American Pie Presents: The Book of Love	American Pie Presents: Girls' Rules
Crew/detail	2005	2006	2007	2009	2020
Director	Steve Rash	Joe Nussbaum	Andrew Waller	John Putch	Mike Elliott
Producer(s)	Mike Elliott	W. K. Border	W. K. Border	Mike Elliott	Joseph P. Genier; Mike Elliott; Karen Gorodetzky; Abbey Lessanu
Writer(s)	Brad Riddell	Eric Lindsay	Eric Lindsay	David H. Steinberg	Blayne Weaver; David H. Steinberg
Composer	Robert Folk	Jeff Cardoni	Jeff Cardoni	David Lawrence	Tim Jones
Cinematography	Victor J. Kemper	Eric Haase	Gerald Packer	Ross Berryman	Damian Horan
Editor	Danny Saphire	Danny Saphire	Rod Dean; Andrew Somers	John Gilbert	Maria Friesen; Charles Norris
Production company	Rogue Pictures	Neo Art & Logic; Capital Arts Entertainment; Rogue Pictures	Neo Art & Logic; Rogue Pictures	Capital Arts Entertainment	Universal 1440 Entertainment
Distribution	Universal Pictures	Universal Studios Home Entertainment	Universal Pictures	Universal Studios	Universal Studios Home Entertainment
Runtime	92 minutes	98 minutes	87 minutes	94 minutes	95 minutes
Release date	December 26, 2005	December 19, 2006	December 26, 2007	December 22, 2009	October 6, 2020
