= American Pie (film series) =

Series of sex-comedy films

- Official film series logo
- Distributed by: Universal Pictures
- Running time: 788 minutes
- Country: United States
- Language: English
- Budget: $147 million
- Box office: $989.5 million

American Pie is a film series created by screenwriter Adam Herz, consisting of four sex comedy films. American Pie, the first film in the series, was released by Universal Pictures in 1999. The film became a worldwide pop culture phenomenon and gained a cult following among young people. Following American Pie, the second and third films in the series, American Pie 2 (2001) and American Wedding (2003), were released. The fourth, American Reunion, was released in 2012. A spin-off film series titled American Pie Presents consists of five direct-to-video films that were released from 2005 to 2020.

Throughout the first film in the original series, Jim Levenstein (Jason Biggs) tries to develop a relationship with his school classmate Nadia (Shannon Elizabeth). Jim and three of his best friends, Kevin Myers (Thomas Ian Nicholas), Paul Finch (Eddie Kaye Thomas), and Chris Ostreicher (Chris Klein), make a pact to lose their virginity before their high school graduation. Steve Stifler (Seann William Scott), the obnoxious jock of the group, provides them with unorthodox advice while hosting wild parties in the meantime. In the second film, the five boys host a summer party and Jim becomes interested in his friend, Michelle Flaherty (Alyson Hannigan). In the third film, Jim and Michelle plan to marry, although the forced invitation of Stifler could ruin everything. In the fourth film, the group gets back together in anticipation of their 13th year since graduating from high school. The spin-off series revolves around relatives of Stifler, including his brother Matt (Tad Hilgenbrink), his cousins Erik (John White), Dwight (Steve Talley), Scott (John Patrick Jordan), and Stephanie (Lizze Broadway), and their respective friends.

The original films were produced on a total budget of US$145 million and have grossed nearly a billion dollars worldwide. The spin-off films were released direct-to-video. The original series has received mixed reviews from critics, while the spin-off series has received negative reviews.

== Cast ==
=== Principal cast ===
Character	Original series				Spin-off series				
Character	American Pie	American Pie 2	American Wedding	American Reunion	Band Camp	The Naked Mile	Beta House	The Book of Love	Girls' Rules
Character	1999	2001	2003	2012	2005	2006	2007	2009	2020
Noah Levenstein ("Jim's Dad")	Eugene Levy	Eugene Levy	Eugene Levy	Eugene Levy	Eugene Levy	Eugene Levy	Eugene Levy	Eugene Levy	
James "Jim" Levenstein	Jason Biggs	Jason Biggs	Jason Biggs	Jason Biggs					
Michelle Flaherty	Alyson Hannigan	Alyson Hannigan	Alyson Hannigan	Alyson Hannigan					
Steven "Steve" Stifler	Seann William Scott	Seann William Scott	Seann William Scott	Seann William Scott					
Kevin Myers	Thomas Ian Nicholas	Thomas Ian Nicholas	Thomas Ian Nicholas	Thomas Ian Nicholas					
Paul Finch	Eddie Kaye Thomas	Eddie Kaye Thomas	Eddie Kaye Thomas	Eddie Kaye Thomas					
Mrs. Levenstein ("Jim's Mom")	Molly Cheek	Molly Cheek	Molly Cheek	Molly Cheek					
Jeanine Stifler ("The MILF"; "Stifler's Mom")	Jennifer Coolidge	Jennifer Coolidge	Jennifer Coolidge	Jennifer Coolidge					
John (aka MILF Guy #2)	John Cho	John Cho	John Cho	John Cho					
Justin (aka MILF Guy #1)	Justin Isfeld	Justin Isfeld	Justin Isfeld	Justin Isfeld					
Chuck Sherman ("The Sherminator")	Chris Owen	Chris Owen		Chris Owen	Chris Owen				
Chris "Oz" Ostreicher	Chris Klein	Chris Klein		Chris Klein					
Heather	Mena Suvari	Mena Suvari		Mena Suvari					
Victoria "Vicky" Lathum	Tara Reid	Tara Reid		Tara Reid					
Jessica	Natasha Lyonne	Natasha Lyonne		Natasha Lyonne					
Nadia	Shannon Elizabeth	Shannon Elizabeth		Shannon Elizabeth					
Matt Stifler	Eli Marienthal	Eli Marienthal			Tad Hilgenbrink				
Tom Myers	Casey Affleck	Casey Affleck							
Cadence Flaherty			January Jones						
Harold Flaherty			Fred Willard						
Mary Flaherty			Deborah Rush						
Selena				Dania Ramirez					
Mia				Katrina Bowden					
Kara				Ali Cobrin					
AJ				Chuck Hittinger					
Ron				Jay Harrington					
Rachel Finch				Rebecca De Mornay (uncredited)					
Elyse Houston					Arielle Kebbel				
Chloe					Crystle Lightning				
James "Jimmy" Chong					Jun Hee Lee				
Ernie Kaplowitz					Jason Earles				
Oscar					Omar Benson Miller				
Erik Stifler						John White	John White		
Dwight Stifler						Steve Talley	Steve Talley		
Harry Stifler						Christopher McDonald	Christopher McDonald		
Mike "Cooze" Coozeman						Jake Siegel	Jake Siegel		
Jill						Jaclyn A. Smith	Jaclyn A. Smith		
Ryan Grimm						Ross Thomas			
Tracy Sterling						Jessy Schram			
Ashley Thomas							Meghan Heffern		
Rob Shearson								Bug Hall	
Scott Stifler								John Patrick Jordan	
Nathan Jenkyll								Kevin M. Horton	
Marshall "Lube" Lubetsky								Brandon Hardesty	
Heidi								Beth Behrs	
Dana								Melanie Papalia	
Ashley Lawrence								Jennifer Holland	
Madeline Shearson								Rosanna Arquette	
Annie Watson									Madison Pettis
Stephanie Stifler									Lizze Broadway
Kayla									Piper Curda
Michelle									Natasha Behnam

=== Additional crew ===
Crew/detail	Original series			
Crew/detail	American Pie	American Pie 2	American Wedding	American Reunion
Crew/detail	1999	2001	2003	2012
Director(s)	Paul Weitz; Chris Weitz	J. B. Rogers	Jesse Dylan	Jon Hurwitz; Hayden Schlossberg
Writer(s)	Adam Herz	Adam Herz	Adam Herz	Jon Hurwitz; Hayden Schlossberg
Producer(s)	Chris Moore; Craig Perry; Chris Weitz; Warren Zide	Adam Herz; Paul Weitz; Chris Moore; Craig Perry; Chris Weitz; Warren Zide; Chris Bender		Adam Herz; Chris Moore; Craig Perry; Warren Zide
Composer	David Lawrence	David Lawrence	Christophe Beck	Lyle Workman
Cinematography	Richard Crudo	Mark Irwin	Lloyd Ahern	Daryn Okada
Editor	Priscilla Nedd-Friendly	Stuart Pappé; Larry Madaras	Stuart Pappé	Jeff Betancourt
Production companies	Summit Entertainment; Zide/Perry Productions	LivePlanet; Zide/Perry Productions	LivePlanet; Zide/Perry Productions	Relativity Media; Zide/Perry Productions
Distribution	Universal Pictures	Universal Pictures	Universal Pictures	Universal Pictures
Runtime	95 minutes	110 minutes	96 minutes	113 minutes
Release date	July 9, 1999	August 10, 2001	August 1, 2003	April 6, 2012

== Production ==
=== Development ===
In the original American Pie (1999), Jim Levenstein and his friends Kevin Myers, Paul Finch, and Chris Ostreicher attempt to lose their virginity before their high school graduation. Jim pursues Czech exchange student Nadia, but his attempts fail after he ejaculates prematurely twice during foreplay, and instead pursues band geek Michelle, asking her to the prom. At Stifler's prom after-party, Jim has a one-night stand with Michelle, and the rest of the friends lose their virginity as well.

In American Pie 2 (2001), Jim and his friends organize a party at a summer beach house in Grand Harbor reuniting the high school gang. Nadia returns, and Jim asks Michelle to help him finally have sex with her. Jim ends up realizing he is in love with Michelle (whose feelings are mutual), and goes to a recital where she is performing to reveal this to her.

American Wedding (2003) begins with Jim proposing to Michelle. Finch, Kevin, and Stifler help the arranging of his marriage.

In the years that have passed since American Wedding, the most recent installment American Reunion (2012) shows Jim and Michelle married with a child, and Kevin has gotten married himself, whereas Oz and Heather grew apart, Finch still has not found love, and Stifler has not come to terms with the fact that his teenage years are long gone. Now these lifelong friends have come home as adults for their thirteenth high school class reunion, to reminisce about – and get inspired by – the hormonal teens they once were.

The film series began with American Pie, released on July 9, 1999. This was followed by three sequels: American Pie 2, released on August 10, 2001, American Wedding, released on August 1, 2003, and American Reunion, released on April 6, 2012.

=== Future ===
A fifth theatrical film, under the working title American Pie 5, was in consideration in 2012, as the fourth film had done well internationally and Universal had secured a production deal with Hurwitz and Schlossberg. In August 2017, Seann William Scott said in an interview that the fourth film probably had not made enough at the domestic box office to warrant another film. In August 2018, Tara Reid said she met with the directors, with them saying that the fifth film will happen, and that filming could begin soon. In March 2021, Reid further elaborated that both the script is written, and that "it’s one of the best ones" in the series. A few months later, Jason Biggs denied the fact regarding script developments, but said that there were always ideas for a sequel, albeit having many obstacles.

On September 29, 2022, The Hollywood Reporter informed, that another American Pie Presents movie is in the works at Universal 1440. The film is developed and written by Sujata Day.

== Spin-off series ==
=== Additional crew ===
Crew/detail	Films				
Crew/detail	American Pie Presents: Band Camp	American Pie Presents: The Naked Mile	American Pie Presents: Beta House	American Pie Presents: The Book of Love	American Pie Presents: Girls' Rules
Crew/detail	2005	2006	2007	2009	2020
Director	Steve Rash	Joe Nussbaum	Andrew Waller	John Putch	Mike Elliott
Producer(s)	Mike Elliott	W. K. Border	W. K. Border	Mike Elliott	Mike Elliott; Abbey Lessanu; Joseph P. Genier; Karen Gorodetzky
Writer(s)	Brad Riddell	Eric Lindsay	Eric Lindsay	David H. Steinberg	Blayne Weaver; David H. Steinberg
Composer	Robert Folk	Jeff Cardoni	Jeff Cardoni	David Lawrence	Tim Jones
Cinematography	Victor J. Kemper	Eric Haase	Gerald Packer	Ross Berryman	Damian Horan
Editor	Danny Saphire	Danny Saphire	Rod Dean; Andrew Somers	John Gilbert	Maria Friesen; Charles Norris
Production company	Rogue Pictures	Rogue Pictures; Neo Art & Logic; Capital Arts Entertainment	Rogue Pictures; Neo Art & Logic	Capital Arts Entertainment	Universal 1440 Entertainment
Distribution	Universal Studios Home Entertainment	Universal Studios Home Entertainment	Universal Studios Home Entertainment	Universal Studios Home Entertainment	Universal Pictures Home Entertainment
Runtime	92 minutes	98 minutes	87 minutes	94 minutes	95 minutes
Release date	December 26, 2005	December 19, 2006	December 26, 2007	December 22, 2009	October 6, 2020

=== Production ===
==== Development ====
American Pie Presents: Band Camp (2005) follows Stifler's younger brother Matt Stifler (Tad Hilgenbrink), who is forced to attend band camp for the summer. While there, he realizes he must change his arrogant ways in order to win over Elyse.

American Pie Presents: The Naked Mile (2006) follows Erik Stifler (John White), the only Stifler to possibly graduate from high school a virgin. After a failed attempt at sex with his girlfriend Tracy (Jessy Schram), she gives Erik a free pass to go to the University of Michigan, where his cousin Dwight (Steve Talley) attends, to lose his virginity. In the process, Erik's loyalty is put to the test.

American Pie Presents: Beta House (2007) continues a year after The Naked Mile. Erik has now graduated from high school, has lost his girlfriend to her previous boyfriend, and is starting college. He must complete a series of tasks before he can join Dwight's fraternity and also begins a new relationship with Ashley Thomas (Meghan Heffern), a girl he met in the co-ed bathrooms in their dorm.

American Pie Presents: The Book of Love (2009) takes place ten years after American Pie. Set in East Great Falls, a fire in the school's library results in the destruction of the Book of Love (the "Bible" from the first film). With the help of the book's creator, Mr. Levenstein, the people who started the fire set out to restore the book and lose their virginity.

American Pie Presents: Girls' Rules (2020) follows a group of four teenage girls who make a pact to get what they want before their prom and end up falling in love with the same guy.

More than six years after the release of the original American Pie, the franchise continued with a direct-to-video spin-off Presents series; consisting of Band Camp, released on December 26, 2005, The Naked Mile, released on December 12, 2006, Beta House, released on December 26, 2007, The Book of Love, released on December 22, 2009, and Girls' Rules, released on October 6, 2020. All five spin-offs center around relatives of Steve Stifler, who include his brother Matt and his cousins Erik, Dwight, Scott and Stephanie Stifler.

While set in the American Pie continuity, these spin-off films featured mostly new characters. Aside from the raunchy humor, the common elements among the American Pie Presents films are the continued presence of Jim's Dad and members of the Stifler clan. Other than Jim's Dad, the only other returning characters are Matt Stifler, who takes center stage for the first spin-off, albeit played by a new actor, and Chuck Sherman, who is the guidance counselor for East Great Falls High School in the first spin-off.

== Reception ==
=== Box office performance ===
Film	Release date	Box office gross				Box office ranking		Budget (million)	Ref.
Film	Release date	Opening weekend (North America)	North America	Other territories	Worldwide	All time North America	All time worldwide	Budget (million)	Ref.
American Pie	July 9, 1999	$18,709,680	$102,561,004	$132,922,000	$235,483,004	#559	#475	$11,000,000	
American Pie 2	August 10, 2001	$45,117,985	$145,103,595	$142,450,000	$287,553,595	#289	#366	$30,000,000	
American Wedding	August 1, 2003	$33,369,440	$104,565,114	$126,884,089	$231,449,203	#543	#484	$55,000,000	
American Reunion	April 6, 2012	$21,514,080	$57,011,521	$177,978,063	$234,989,584	#1248	#477	$50,000,000	
Total			$409,241,234	$580,234,152	$989,475,386			$146,000,000	
Average			$102.3 million	$145.1 million	$247.4 million			$36.5 million	

=== Critical and public response ===
Film	Rotten Tomatoes	Metacritic	CinemaScore
American Pie	61% (128 reviews)	58 (30 reviews)	A−
American Pie 2	52% (127 reviews)	43 (28 reviews)	B+
American Wedding	54% (155 reviews)	43 (34 reviews)	B+
American Reunion	45% (183 reviews)	49 (34 reviews)	B+

== Home media ==
Box set containing all eight films from 1999 to 2012

=== DVD release ===
DVD name	Region 1	Region 2	Region 4
American Pie	December 21, 1999	—N/a	October 4, 2006
American Pie 2	January 15, 2002	—N/a	May 17, 2006
American Wedding	January 2, 2004	March 19, 2012	January 19, 2004
American Reunion	July 10, 2012	September 10, 2012	August 22, 2012
American Pie Presents: Band Camp	December 26, 2005	October 31, 2005	October 25, 2005
American Pie Presents: The Naked Mile	December 19, 2006	December 4, 2006	December 29, 2006
American Pie Presents: Beta House	December 26, 2007	March 19, 2012	December 31, 2007
American Pie Presents: The Book of Love	December 22, 2009	March 19, 2012	December 31, 2009
American Pie Presents: Girls' Rules	October 6, 2020		—N/a

Blu-ray

Blu-Ray name	Region 1 A	Region 2 B	Region 4 B
American Pie	March 13, 2012	March 19, 2012	May 4, 2012
American Pie 2	March 13, 2012	March 19, 2012	May 4, 2012
American Wedding	March 13, 2012	March 19, 2012	May 4, 2012
American Reunion	July 10, 2012	September 10, 2012	August 22, 2012
American Pie Presents: Band Camp	February 11, 2020	—N/a	—N/a
American Pie Presents: The Naked Mile	April 7, 2020	—N/a	—N/a
American Pie Presents: Beta House	August 18, 2020	—N/a	—N/a
American Pie Presents: The Book of Love	December 22, 2009	—N/a	—N/a
American Pie Presents: Girls' Rules	September 7, 2021		
