= American Pie (film) =

1999 American teen sex comedy

- Theatrical release poster
- Directed by: Paul Weitz
- Written by: Adam Herz
- Produced by: Warren Zide; Craig Perry; Chris Moore; Chris Weitz
- Starring: Jason Biggs; Chris Klein; Natasha Lyonne; Thomas Ian Nicholas; Tara Reid; Mena Suvari; Alyson Hannigan; Eugene Levy
- Cinematography: Richard Crudo
- Edited by: Priscilla Nedd-Friendly
- Music by: David Lawrence
- Production companies: Zide/Perry Productions; Universal Pictures
- Distributed by: Universal Pictures
- Release date: July 9, 1999
- Running time: 95 minutes
- Country: United States
- Language: English
- Budget: $11 million
- Box office: $235.5 million

American Pie is a 1999 American teen comedy film directed and co-produced by Paul Weitz and written by Adam Herz. The film's main ensemble cast includes Jason Biggs, Chris Klein, Alyson Hannigan, Natasha Lyonne, Thomas Ian Nicholas, Tara Reid, Mena Suvari, Eddie Kaye Thomas, and Seann William Scott, with Eugene Levy, Shannon Elizabeth, Chris Owen, and Jennifer Coolidge in supporting roles. The coming-of-age story follows a group of high school classmates who make a pact to lose their virginity before they graduate.

After the success of Wes Craven's horror teen film Scream (1996), Herz began developing the script for American Pie, originally titled Untitled Teenage Sex Comedy That Can Be Made For Under $10 Million That Most Readers Will Probably Hate But I Think You Will Love. A bidding war between major film studios ensued, and Universal Pictures won the film's rights in 1998. First-time directors Chris and Paul Weitz were attached as directors for the film, although only Paul was credited. Under a new title of Great Falls, filming took place from July to September 1998. The picture originally received an NC-17 rating from the Motion Picture Association of America (MPAA); edits were made to secure an R rating. The film's title was later changed to American Pie.

Released theatrically by Universal Pictures on July 9, 1999, in the United States, American Pie initially received mixed reviews from critics, who were polarized on the raunchy humor, but praised the performances. Nonetheless, the film was a box office success, grossing $235.5 million worldwide on a $10 million budget. American Pie revived the teen sex comedy genre for the late 1990s. The film's success also spawned a franchise, including three theatrical sequels American Pie 2, American Wedding, and American Reunion, and five direct-to-video film series American Pie Presents, consisting of Band Camp, The Naked Mile, Beta House, The Book of Love, and Girls' Rules.

== Plot ==
At East Great Falls High School in Michigan, four friends await graduation: the sexually inexperienced Jim Levenstein; the insensitive lacrosse star Chris "Oz" Ostreicher; the intellectual Paul Finch; and Kevin Myers, who is desperate to have sex with his girlfriend Vicky.

During a house party hosted by womanizing jock Steven Stifler, the friends learn that their dorky classmate Chuck Sherman has lost his virginity. Frustrated by their lack of sexual experience, the four make a pact to each lose their virginity by prom night in three weeks.

Kevin struggles to seduce Vicky, who fears he only wants her for sex and insists on waiting for the perfect moment to lose her virginity. On the advice of Vicky's friend Jessica, Kevin tries to win Vicky over by giving her an orgasm. Guided by his older brother, he discovers a book of sex tips compiled by former students and uses a cunnilingus technique to rekindle their relationship.

Finch pays Jessica to spread rumors about his sexual prowess and large penis, making him popular with the high school girls. When Stifler's prom date ditches him to make herself available for Finch, Stifler retaliates by spiking Finch's caffè mocha with a laxative. Stifler lures him to the girls' restroom, where he experiences diarrhea, and gathers a crowd to mock him, ruining his carefully crafted reputation. Oz joins the choir to pursue girls unaware of his reputation, but he learns to enjoy performing and gains the attention of Heather, who invites him to the prom. She rescinds the offer after realizing that Oz is faking his sensitive persona, but reconciles with him after seeing his genuine efforts to change.

Desperate for experience, Jim, inspired by Oz's description of a vagina, has sex with a warm apple pie, but is humiliated when caught by his father. When Czech foreign exchange student Nadia asks Jim to help her study at his house after her ballet class, Stifler convinces him to set up a webcam so they can watch her change clothes. Jim unwittingly shares the livestream with the school's entire e-mail directory, letting everyone watch as Nadia undresses and masturbates to Jim's porn collection. Encouraged by his friends, Jim purposely walks in on Nadia, and she invites him to join, but, to her disappointment, he prematurely ejaculates twice before they can have sex. Following the incident, Nadia is sent back to the Czech Republic, and Jim becomes the laughingstock of the school. Frustrated and thinking she did not see the livestream, Jim asks the seemingly naive band geek Michelle to go to the prom.

As school draws to a close, Oz, realizing his feelings for Heather have become sincere, abandons his lacrosse championship game to perform a duet with her. At the prom, Kevin insists Jim, Oz, and Finch fulfil their pact and lose their virginities, but they refuse, frustrated at the social pressures to have sex for the sake of it, and accuse Kevin of using the pact to hide his fear of losing his virginity. After learning that Sherman lied about having sex, the boys reconcile with Kevin, who admits he is afraid.

At Stifler's lake house post-prom party, Kevin finally tells Vicky he loves her and they have sex. Afterward, Vicky ends their relationship, admitting it is unrealistic for them to maintain a long-distance romance while attending different colleges; they part while affirming their love for each other. Oz confesses his feelings to Heather, and they spend a romantic night together by the lake. Finch propositions Stifler's mom, and they have sex on the pool table; Stifler later finds them together and faints. Michelle reveals her aggressive sexuality and takes Jim upstairs to lose his virginity.

The next day, Jim, Oz, Finch, and Kevin meet up and discuss how things will change after high school, making a toast to their next step.

== Cast ==
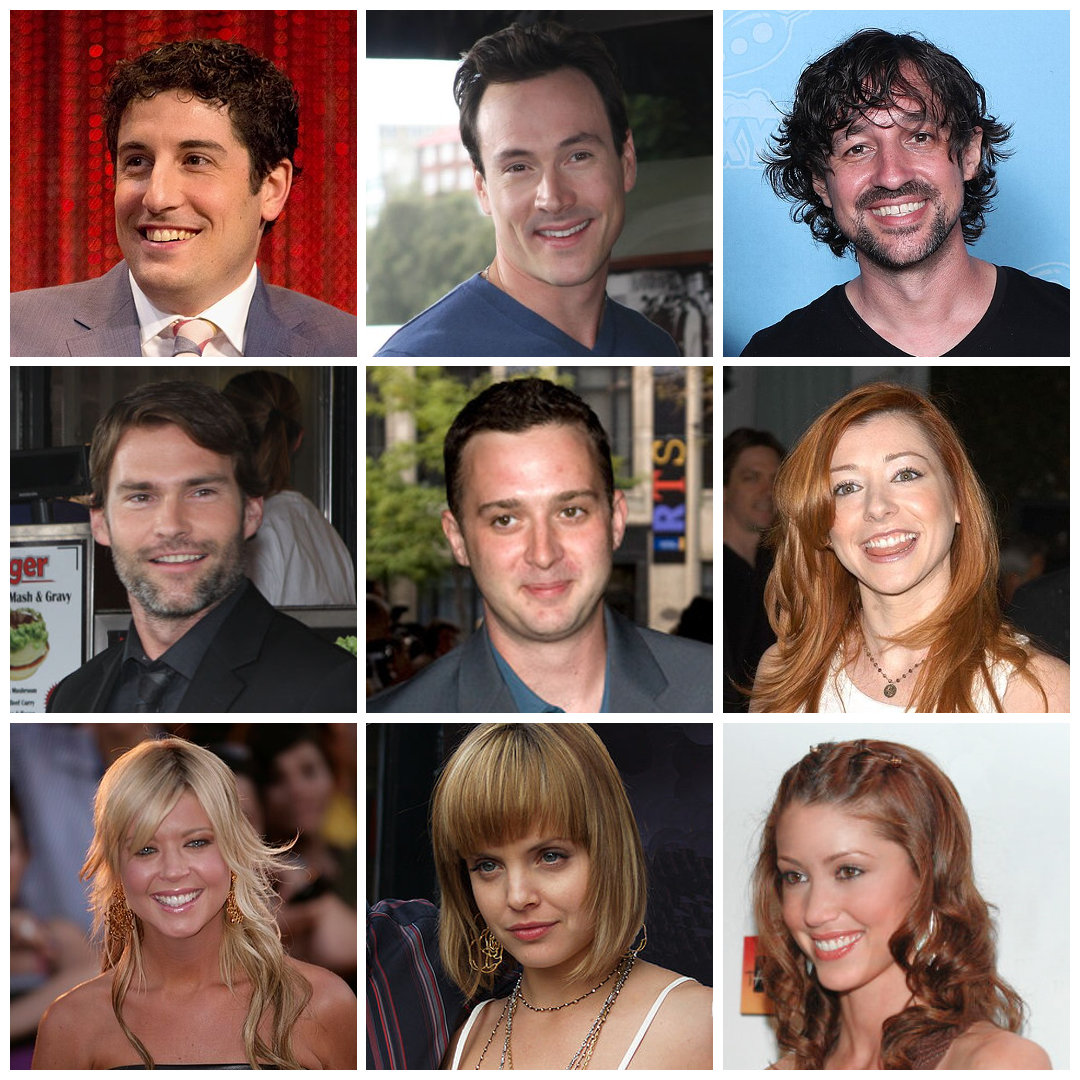
Jason Biggs (pictured in 2014), Chris Klein (2012), Thomas Ian Nicholas (2021), Seann William Scott (2012), Eddie Kaye Thomas (2008), Alyson Hannigan (2003), Tara Reid, Mena Suvari (both 2007), and Shannon Elizabeth (2006)

- Jason Biggs as Jim Levenstein, a lustful, naive, and bumbling student
- Chris Klein as Chris "Oz" Ostreicher, a handsome and oafish school jock
- Thomas Ian Nicholas as Kevin Myers, an earnest student struggling to finally have sex with his girlfriend Vicky
- Seann William Scott as Steve Stifler, a crude and boorish student notorious for his parties
- Eddie Kaye Thomas as Paul Finch, an educated and sophisticated student
- Alyson Hannigan as Michelle Flaherty, a timid, flute-playing student hiding a domineering sexual side
- Chris Owen as Chuck Sherman, a self-proclaimed ladies' man
- Tara Reid as Vicky Lathum, Kevin's girlfriend who obsesses on making her life perfect
- Natasha Lyonne as Jessica, a sarcastic and worldly student
- Mena Suvari as Heather Gardner, a sweet-natured and virginal choir girl
- Eugene Levy as Jim's Dad, Jim's awkward but supportive and sex-positive father
- Shannon Elizabeth as Nadia, a sexually precocious Czech exchange student
- Jennifer Coolidge as Stifler's Mom, a seductive mature woman

American Pie also features Clyde Kusatsu as an English Teacher; Lawrence Pressman as Coach Marshall; Molly Cheek as Jim's Mom; Christina Milian as Band Member; Eden Riegel as Sophomore Chick; John Cho as "Milf" Guy; Sasha Barrese as Courtney; Eric Lively as Albert; Eli Marienthal as Stifler's Younger Brother; and Casey Affleck as Kevin's brother. Cameo appearances include rock band Blink-182 members Tom DeLonge (Note: credited as Thomas M. DeLonge), Mark Hoppus, and Travis Barker, who appear as band members watching Nadia's and Jim's livestream, (Note: Former Blink-182 member Scott Raynor is incorrectly credited instead of Travis Barker.) and Playboy Playmate Stacy Fuson.

== Production ==
=== Development ===
Screenwriter Adam Herz was looking to revive the teen sex comedy genre, which previously saw a boom period in the 1980s. Using Porky's and Bachelor Party as inspiration, Herz wrote a script that was based on his days at East Grand Rapids High School in Michigan. He wanted to make "a teen comedy that talked to kids on their level – which meant making an R-rated movie".

Spurred on by the box office success of Scream, which signaled the return of teen films, Herz completed the first draft of the script in six weeks. The screenplay, tentatively titled Untitled Teenage Sex Comedy That Can Be Made For Under $10 Million That Most Readers Will Probably Hate But I Think You Will Love, sparked a bidding war among studios, which was won by Universal Pictures for $750,000 in 1998. Universal tapped Chris and Paul Weitz, who had cowritten the 1998 animated film Antz, to direct the film. Said Chris, "We were as surprised as everybody else when we got the gig because we had never directed a frame of film before". For American Pie, Chris and Paul shared directing duties, though only Paul remains credited.

=== Casting ===
Universal wanted to cast Jonathan Taylor Thomas in the role of Jim Levenstein, but Thomas turned it down. Bill Murray was considered for the role of Noah Levenstein, Jim's dad. Eugene Levy was ultimately cast in the role, which was originally written to be "much more of a red-meat, All-American dad guy", but Levy decided on playing him as more of a "neurotic, suffering, overprotective, overinvolved father".According to his book Fahrenheit-182, Blink-182 members Tom DeLonge and Mark Hoppus auditioned for the role of Stifler but it ultimately was given to Seann William Scott.

=== Filming ===
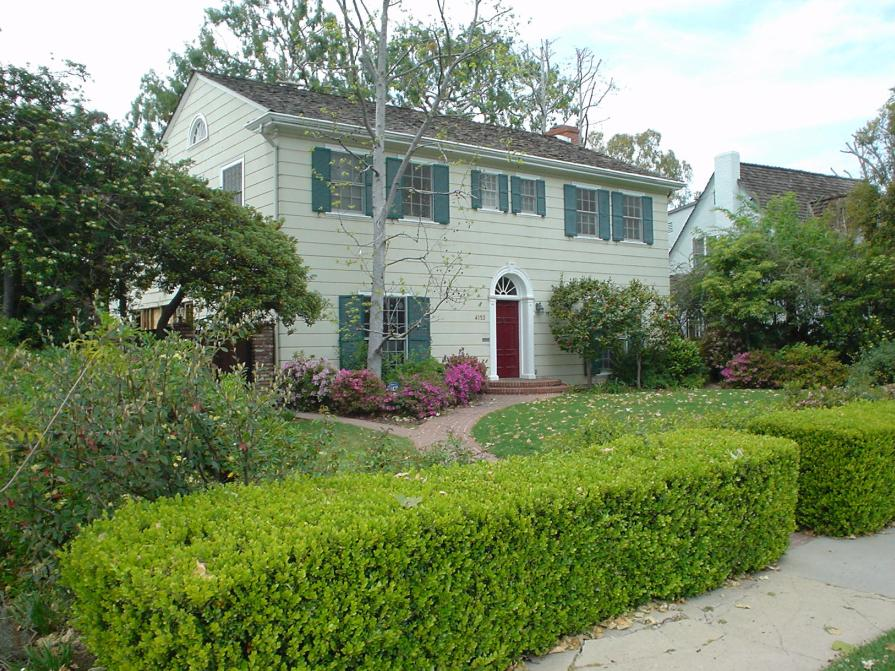
Northwest view of the Los Cerritos house.

Principal photography on the film, then titled Great Falls, began on July 21 and wrapped on September 11, 1998. The title was changed to American Pie due to a negative test screening audiences reaction to the title Great Falls, Universal initially repeatedly turned down the title American Pie until late in production.

Though set in Michigan, the film was shot in Southern California, particularly Long Beach. Millikan High School was used for exterior shots, and Long Beach Polytechnic High School was used for interior shots. Both schools are within five miles of the Virginia Country Club and Los Cerritos neighborhood (where Ferris Bueller's Day Off and Donnie Darko were filmed).

In the film, the town is called "East Great Falls". The restaurant hangout, "Dog Years", is based on Yesterdog, a popular hot dog restaurant in the nearby Eastown neighborhood of Grand Rapids. The "Central Chicks" and "Central" Lacrosse team that East Great Falls plays against is an amalgam of nearby Forest Hills Central High School. The working title for the film had been "East Grand Rapids".

Due to the film's modest budget, Universal gave the filmmakers considerable creative freedom during filming, which allowed the actors to improvise much of the dialogue.

== Music ==
=== Soundtrack ===
The film's soundtrack peaked at number 50 on the Billboard 200 chart.

Professional ratings
Review scores
Source	Rating
AllMusic	2.5/5 stars

American Pie: Music from the Motion Picture
No.	Title	Writer(s)	Producer(s)	Length
1.	"New Girl" (Third Eye Blind)	Stephan Jenkins; Kevin Cadogan	Stephan Jenkins	2:16
2.	"You Wanted More" (Tonic)	Emerson Hart; Dan Lavery; Jeff Russo	Tonic; Mark Endert	3:52
3.	"Mutt" (Blink-182)	Mark Hoppus; Tom DeLonge; Travis Barker	Jerry Finn	3:23
4.	"Glory" (Sugar Ray)	Mark McGrath; Charles Frazier; Rodney Sheppard; Matthew Murphy Karges; Craig Bullock; Joseph "McG" Nichol	David Kahne	3:29
5.	"Super Down" (Super TransAtlantic)	Jason Bieler; Pete Dembrowski; Richard Sanders; George Fotiad	Jason Bieler; Jim Morris	4:07
6.	"Find Your Way Back Home" (Dishwalla)	Scot Alexander; Rodney Browning Cravens; J. R. Richards; Pete Maloney; Jim Wood	Dishwalla	4:04
7.	"Good Morning Baby" (Dan Wilson of Semisonic & Bic Runga)	Dan Wilson; Bic Runga	Dan Wilson	3:34
8.	"Stranger by the Day" (Shades Apart)	Ed Brown; Kevin Lynch; Mark Vecchiarelli	Lou Giordano	4:02
9.	"Summertime" (Bachelor No. 1)	Scot Sax	Scot Sax; Dusty Wakeman	3:46
10.	"Vintage Queen" (Goldfinger)	John Feldmann	Tim Palmer	3:04
11.	"Sway" (Bic Runga)	Big Runga	Bic Runga	4:23
12.	"Wishen" (The Loose Nuts)	Ben Brewer	Greg Hammer; The Loose Nuts	3:04
13.	"Man with the Hex" (The Atomic Fireballs)	John Bunkley	Bruce Fairbairn	3:01

The following songs were included in the film but were not featured on the soundtrack album:

- Sex-o-rama Band – "Love Muscle" (plays in the beginning with Jim watching a porn video, and again with Jim having sex with a pie.)
- The Ventures – "Walk Don't Run" (Plays when Finch runs to the bathroom.)
- Barenaked Ladies – "One Week" (Plays twice in the film, once during one of the party scenes and during the end of the film where Jim's Dad watches Jim stripping at the webcam.)
- The Brian Jonestown Massacre – "Going To Hell" (Plays in the first Dog Years scene before Stifler's party.)
- Third Eye Blind – "Semi-Charmed Life" (Plays during the Dog Years scene after the party.)
- Oleander – "I Walk Alone" (Plays during one of the party scenes, Stifler opens the door for the band geeks and rejects them from the party.)
- Hole – "Celebrity Skin" (Plays when Kevin performs oral sex on Vicki)
- Everclear – "Everything to Everyone" (During a montage with Oz and Heather on the docks and Kevin and Vicki in the house.)
- Harvey Danger – "Flagpole Sitta" (Plays when Jim sets up his webcam.)
- Duke Daniels – "Following a Star" (During a montage with Jim buying a tuxedo and Vicki dancing in the mirror.)
- Simon & Garfunkel – "Mrs. Robinson" (Plays when Finch seduces Stifler's Mom.)
- Libra Presents Taylor – "Anomaly - Calling Your Name (Granny's Epicure Mix)" (Plays when Nadia is about to have sex with Jim.)
- Etta James – "At Last" (Plays when Jim walks over to Nadia in slow motion.)
- Five Easy Pieces - “Turn It Around” (When Kevin asks his brother tips on how to give Vicky an orgasm.)
- Loni Rose – "I Never thought you would come" (When Oz and Heather kiss.)
- Norah Jones – "The Long Day is Over"
- Marvin Gaye – "How Sweet It Is (To Be Loved by You)"
- Maria Muldaur – "Midnight at the Oasis"
- Simple Minds – "Don't You (Forget About Me)"

== Release ==
In May 1999, shortly before the film's release, Universal sold the international distribution rights to American Pie for $4–$5 million, with additional bonuses based on the film's performance. The film rights were among the most popular being bid for at the 1999 Cannes Film Festival, the majority of which were purchased by Summit Entertainment, covering all non-English speaking territories. This sale was part of a financial risk mitigation strategy by Universal, but many Hollywood executives saw it as misguided given the film's relatively low budget of $11.8 million, (Note: The 1999 budget of $11.8 million is equivalent to $22.8 million in 2025.) $20 million in international marketing costs, and the fact that international box offices were contributing 55% or more to a film's global gross.

Premiere predicted that the film would be the eighth highest-grossing film of the summer with a gross of $100 million in the United States. According to the Los Angeles Times, American Pie was anticipated to become a sleeper hit of the summer, and had the potential to break the convention that American teen comedies performed poorly outside of the country. The New York Times also cited American Pie as part of the then rising trend of mainstream television 'gross-out humor'.

The film originally received an NC-17 rating from the Motion Picture Association of America until edits were made to secure an R rating. Universal wanted an R rating to distinguish it from recent PG-13 teen films.

=== Home media ===
American Pie was released on DVD and VHS on December 21, 1999, in both theatrical and unrated versions. The unrated version was released January 11, 2000 on LaserDisc. A new two-disc Ultimate Edition DVD release of the film debuted on July 31, 2001, to coincide with the release of its successor American Pie 2.

On March 13, 2012, the film premiered on Blu-ray, along with American Pie 2 and American Wedding.

== Reception ==
=== Box office ===
American Pie was released in the United States and Canada on July 9, 1999. During its opening weekend, it grossed a total of $18.7 million from 2,508 theaters—an average of $7,460 per theater—making it the highest-grossing film of the weekend, ahead of Wild Wild West ($16.8 million) in its second week of release, and ahead of Big Daddy ($16 million) in its third. In its second weekend, American Pie fell to the number 2 position with a $13.6 million gross—a 27.5% drop from the previous week—placing it behind Eyes Wide Shut ($21.7 million) and ahead of Lake Placid ($11 million), both in their debut weekends. It fell to the number 3 position in its third weekend with a gross of $10.1 million, behind the debuts of The Haunting ($33.4 million) and Inspector Gadget ($21.9 million). American Pie left the top-ten highest-grossing films after five weeks, with a gross of $85.5 million, and left theaters after 25 weeks with a total gross of $102.5 million. This figure made it the 17th-highest-grossing film of 1999.

Outside of the United States and Canada, American Pie is estimated to have grossed an additional $132.9 million, receiving its highest grosses in Germany ($33.5 million)—where it spent four weeks at number one and was the highest-grossing film of the year —the United Kingdom ($22.1 million), France ($13.7 million), Australia ($10.3 million), and Italy ($8 million).

With a cumulative worldwide gross of $235.5 million, American Pie became the 12th-highest-grossing film of 1999, ahead of Big Daddy ($234.8 million) and behind The Blair Witch Project ($248.6 million). (Note: The 1999 worldwide gross of $235.5 million is equivalent to $455 million in 2025.)

=== Critical response ===
On review aggregation website Rotten Tomatoes, the film holds a 62% approval rating across 130 critics, with an average score of 5.8/10. The consensus reads; "So embarrassing it's believable, American Pie succeeds in bringing back the teen movie genre." On Metacritic, the film has a score of 58 out of 100 based on 30 critics, indicating "mixed or average" reviews. Audience polls by CinemaScore reported moviegoers gave the film an average grade of "A−" on an A+ to F scale.

Positive reviews praised the cast and saw it as an update on the teen sex comedy genre. Owen Gleiberman of Entertainment Weekly called it a "hybrid of the sincere and the synthetic", adding, "It reflects a major shift in contemporary teen culture that the girls in American Pie are as hip to sex as the boys." Film critic Roger Ebert awarded the movie three out of four stars. He noted that "[i]t is not inspired, but it's cheerful and hard-working and sometimes funny, and—here's the important thing—it's not mean. Its characters are sort of sweet and lovable."

Much was made of the film's use of gross-out comedy, which many compared to the similarly raunchy 1998 film There's Something About Mary. On this matter, Ebert commented, "I discover that gross-out gags are not funny when their only purpose is to gross us out, but they can be funny when they emerge unwittingly from the action...[American Pie] observes the rules of comedy". Mary Elizabeth Williams of Salon.com gave a mixed review in which she praised the casting and said "the surprise of American Pie is that it turns out to be not just another examination of good girls and the piggish boys who want to get into their pants. The male characters here actually evolve into something more than mere slaves to their priapism". Writing for UK publication Sight & Sound, Kevin Maher opined "it is only in the presence of the female characters that American Pie offers genuine wit and sparkle".

More negative reviews criticized the reliance on gross-out gags and described the film as a rehash of 1980s teen sex comedy tropes. Stephen Holden of The New York Times said, "Among this year's bumper crop of shallow teen-age movies, it is the shallowest and the most prurient. It may well be the biggest hit." Writing for the San Francisco Examiner, Wesley Morris said the film has "a ludicrously holy take on girls", but praised the cast and said American Pie "is more interesting in unintentional ways, like the fact that it chooses sentimentality as its payoff rather than cringe-worthy scatological horseplay". Jim Sullivan of The Boston Globe wrote that American Pie is a "gross and tasteless high school romp with sentimental mush." The Hollywood Reporter's print review said the film "has a likable cast, but the actors appear throttled back by a pedestrian script and direction. Consequently, one winds up liking the film more than it deserves because of the gameness of its attractive cast".

=== Accolades ===
At the 2000 American Comedy Awards, Eugene Levy was nominated for Funniest Supporting Actor in a Motion Picture. At the 6th Blockbuster Entertainment Awards, Levy won Favorite Supporting Actor in a comedy film, while Jason Biggs and Mena Suvari were nominated for Favorite Actor and Actress (Newcomer), respectively. At the 2000 MTV Movie Awards, American Pie was nominated for Best Movie, with Biggs receiving nominations for Best Comedic Performance and Breakthrough Male Performance. Shannon Elizabeth was nominated for Breakthrough Female Performance.

The film garnered six nominations at the 2000 Teen Choice Awards, including Choice Comedy, Choice Breakout Performance and Choice Liar for Chris Klein, Choice Sleazebag for Seann William Scott, Choice Actor for Biggs, and Choice Chemistry for Biggs' scene with the apple pie. Joseph Middleton and Michelle Morris Gertz also won the Artios Award for Best Casting for Feature Film from the Casting Society of America Awards.

== Legacy ==
=== Modern reception ===
For the film's 20th anniversary in 2019, critic Scott Tobias wrote about the film's legacy for The Guardian and opined that its success is partly due to how it captures the awkwardness of "sexual mortification", namely casting it as both "identifiable and wildly over-the-top". He also noted the film's influence on the raunchy but sensitive bromantic comedy movies to come, such as Judd Apatow movies like The 40-Year Old Virgin and Superbad. "In 1999, American Pie was at the end of one phase and the beginning of another, which is why it seems both dated and prescient – a relic from a randier era of cable-ready frathouse and gross-out comedies, and a look ahead to a sweeter brand of raunch, rooted in deep friendships and the possibility of a more mature, longer-lasting romance."

However, Tobias and other writers acknowledged some of the more toxic aspects of the film, such as its commentary on women, masculinity, and the set piece involving Nadia being filmed without her knowledge or consent. He wrote the film "gives so little thought to the opposite sex, who are either brazenly lusty or careful gatekeepers of their own chastity, waiting for an 'I love you' or some other show of sensitivity, like a password at a speakeasy. Women seem as inexplicable to the film-makers themselves as they are to the characters. That's been an unfortunate part of the continuum of teen sex comedies, too, long before American Pie and well past it." Screenwriter Adam Herz admitted to wanting to make a film that was less sexist than teen movies of the past like Porky's, but that he did not totally succeed with his script.

=== Cultural influence ===
American Pie featured the breakout roles for many of its main cast, including Biggs, Elizabeth, Hannigan, and Lyonne. Scott was considered the film's true breakout mainstream star, moving from working multiple day jobs to a full time actor, though few of the cast were able replicate their successes outside of the American Pie series.

American Pie is frequently cited in lists recognizing the most iconic teen films. On Entertainment Weekly's list of the 50 best high school movies, American Pie was ranked at #22.

The saying "MILF (Mom I'd Love to Fuck)" was used in regard to the character of Stifler's mom (Jennifer Coolidge). The film's usage of "MILF" helped popularize the term and introduce it to a mainstream audience.

A scene in the film in which Jim sticks his penis inside an apple pie became arguably the most infamous scene from the film.

American Pie was among a slew of teen movies to be spoofed in the parody films Not Another Teen Movie and Another Gay Movie. The films parody the famous pie scene, the characters of Oz and Nadia, and the teens' virginity pact.

== Sequels and spin-offs ==
The success of American Pie led to the immediate development of a sequel, American Pie 2 (2001), which surpassed the financial success of the original film. The main cast returned for the film, which follows the boys' holiday adventures at Lake Michigan after their first year of college. In a 2001 interview, Herz said that as long as audiences remained invested in the characters, there could be an untold number of sequels. The success of American Pie 2 led to a third film, American Wedding (2003), which also performed well financially, though less so than its predecessors. Depicting the impending wedding between Jim and Michelle, American Wedding omitted several main cast members, including Klein, Suvari, Reid, and Lyonne, for unspecified reasons.

The lower box office gross of American Pie 3 led to the development of four direct-to-home-video spin-off films under the American Pie Presents banner: Band Camp (2005), The Naked Mile (2006), Beta House (2007), and The Book of Love (2009). These films focus on different characters to the mainline series, but feature Levy as Jim's dad and various Stifler relatives.

A fourth main entry, American Reunion (2012), brings the original cast back together as the friends gather for their high school reunion after several years. Writers Jon Hurwitz and Hayden Schlossberg replaced Herz, aiming to provide a new take on the franchise. A fifth American Pie Presents film, Girls' Rules, was released in 2020, following a female group of friends. The four main films have grossed $990 million together which, combined with the "lucrative" American Pie Presents spin-offs, has made the American Pie series a $1 billion franchise as of 2020.
