= American Pie Presents: The Naked Mile =

2006 film by Joe Nussbaum

- DVD cover
- Directed by: Joe Nussbaum
- Written by: Eric Lindsay
- Based on: Characters by Adam Herz
- Produced by: W. K. Border
- Starring: John White; Jessy Schram; Steve Talley; Christopher McDonald; Ross Thomas; Jake Siegel; Eugene Levy
- Cinematography: Eric Haase
- Edited by: Danny Saphire
- Music by: Jeff Cardoni
- Production companies: Neo Art & Logic; Capital Arts Entertainment
- Distributed by: Universal Studios Home Entertainment; Rogue Pictures
- Release date: December 19, 2006
- Running time: 98 minutes
- Countries: United States; Canada
- Language: English
- Budget: $15 million
- Box office: $27.5 million (sales)

American Pie Presents: The Naked Mile is a 2006 sex comedy film released by Universal Studios Home Entertainment and Rogue Pictures. It is the second installment in the American Pie Presents film series, a spin-off of the American Pie franchise. John White stars as Erik Stifler, a high school senior given a hall pass from his girlfriend (Jessy Schram) after he plans to visit his cousin (Steve Talley) to run a mile naked. Christopher McDonald co-stars as Erik's father and Eugene Levy plays family friend Noah Levenstein.

The Naked Mile was released direct-to-DVD internationally on December 12, 2006, and in the United States on December 19, 2006. The film was a financial success, generating US$27.46 million in United States sales. It received generally negative reviews from film critics. It was followed by Beta House (2007).

== Plot ==
Erik Stifler, Steve and Matt Stifler's cousin, fails to live up to the family name as he is about to graduate from high school as a virgin. As the film opens, Erik feigns an illness so that he can stay home and masturbate. His parents and grandmother unexpectedly walk in and are hit with Erik's semen, causing his grandmother to die of a heart attack. Erik's girlfriend, Tracy, loves him but is not ready for sex. She suddenly decides she is now ready, inviting Erik to her house later to have sex for the first time. They are interrupted when her father comes downstairs for a nightcap. Before Tracy's father can catch him, a naked Erik flees from the dryer, in which he defecated while hiding. Erik's friends Cooze and Ryan plan a road trip to visit Erik's cousin Dwight Stifler at the University of Michigan for an event known as the Naked Mile. Tracy sees this as an opportunity to give Erik a sex pass, hoping that he can quench his lustful desires.

As Erik and his friends arrive on campus, they witness a drinking contest where Dwight is crowned champion. Later, they lose a rough game of football against a bitter rival fraternity composed almost entirely of people with dwarfism. Later at a bar, Erik meets college girl Brandi, who has a fetish for virgins, prompting Ryan and Cooze to make a bet regarding whether or not Erik will sleep with her.

The following morning, Dwight gets attacked by the rival fraternity while walking down the street, landing him in the hospital. However, he manages to make it to the Naked Mile where he joins up with Erik, Ryan, and Cooze. At first, they are reluctant to run, but when Brandi, Jill, and Alexis strip down stark naked, they are finally prompted to strip down as well. Finally, as Erik and Brandi reach the finish line, they share a kiss caught on camera for a TV news report. Watching the report about the Naked Mile at home, Tracy is upset and feels guilty that she allowed Erik a sex pass. Her friends also persuade her to lose her virginity to her ex-boyfriend, Trent, before Eric gets back.

Later that evening, Erik realizes he loves Tracy, so he confesses to Brandi that he cannot sleep with her and rushes back to see Tracy. Tracy's dad says she is at a party when he gets to her house. Erik's car runs out of gas 10 miles from town, so he rides a horse to the party, pounds on the closed bedroom door, and proclaims his love for her. However, Tracy is not in the room because she decided she could not proceed with her plans. They reconcile and have sex.

When Erik returns to the Beta house to pick up his friends the next morning, each guy shares stories of his sexual experiences from the night before. The guys then ask him if he "sealed the deal" with Brandi that night, and when Erik tells them no, Ryan pays up on the bet to Cooze. Erik tells them about his adventure back home to make up with Tracy and finally lose his virginity. The guys are proud of him for officially living up to the Stifler family name, and the three friends go home.

During the post-Naked Mile party, Dwight spots Vicky, the girlfriend of the leader of the opposing fraternity, Rock. She heads up to Dwight's room to have sex. Later, as the film closes, Dwight sends a DVD to Rock that reads, "Payback's a bitch." It reveals Dwight and Vicky having sex to Rock's dismay.

== Cast ==
- John White as Erik Stifler, a high school virgin who is given a guilt-free pass by his girlfriend, Tracy
- Steve Talley as Dwight Stifler, Erik's cousin who is a popular student at the University of Michigan
- Jessy Schram as Tracy Sterling, Erik's girlfriend
- Eugene Levy as Noah Levenstein, a college legend who presides over the Naked Mile run
- Ross Thomas as Ryan Grimm, Erik's best friend who is a womanizer
- Jake Siegel as Mike "Cooze" Coozeman, Erik's friend who is a self-proclaimed ladies' man
- Christopher McDonald as Harry Stifler, Erik's father
- Jordan Prentice as Rock
- Maria Ricossa as Mrs. Stifler
- Candace Kroslak as Brandy
- Mika Winkler as Vicky
- Dan Petronijevic as Bull
- Jaclyn A. Smith as Jill
- Angelique Lewis as Alexis
- Jordan Madley as Brooke
- Melanie Merkosky as Natalie
- Jon Cor as Trent
- Alyssa Nicole Pallett as Porn Chick
- Jessica Booker as Grandma Stifler
- Stuart Clow as Mr. Sterling
- Joe Bostwick as Mr. Williams
- Daniel Morgret as Frankie

== Production ==
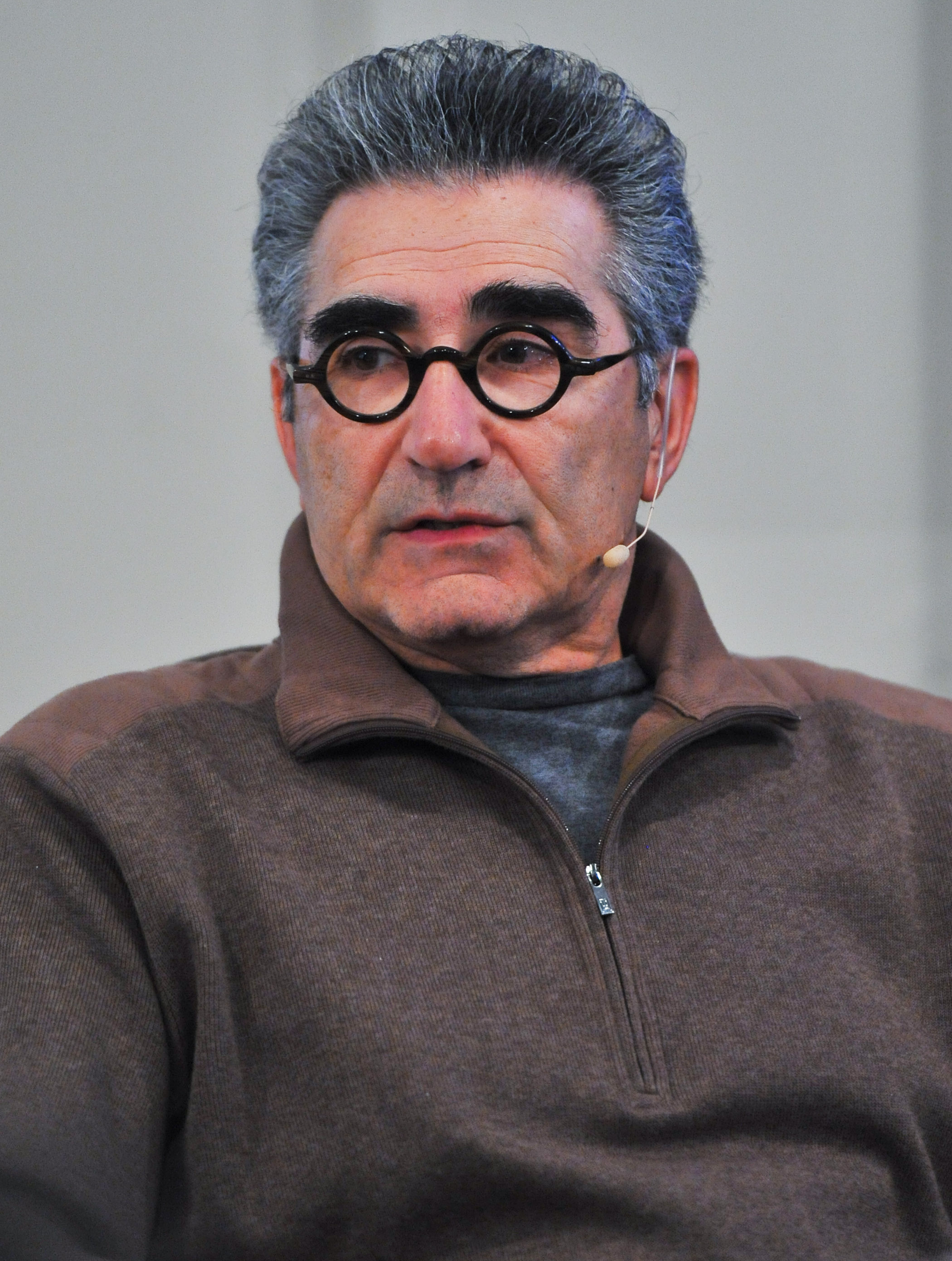
Eugene Levy reprised his role from the previous four American Pie films

"The Naked Mile" of the title refers to a real event that was carried out annually by students of the University of Michigan that ran in earnest beginning in 1985 and ending in 2000 although smaller groups ran through 2004. The participants, mostly senior students, would run or bike a pre-designed course through campus while partially or entirely naked to celebrate the last day of class. The city began the "Naked Mile" crackdown in 2000 after the university began issuing threats to students who ran and arresting some for indecent exposure. Participation in the event was also affected as a result of it attracting amateur videographers who sold videos of the event online.

=== Filming locations ===
Parts were filmed at McMaster University in Hamilton, Ontario, and at the St. George campus of the University of Toronto in Toronto, Ontario. The Naked Mile itself was filmed at Victoria College, a federated college within the University of Toronto. Other parts were filmed at Port Credit Secondary School in Mississauga, Ontario.

== Reception ==
=== Sales ===
The DVD was released on December 19, 2006, in the USA. In the opening weekend, 478,336 units were sold, generating revenue of $9,561,937. As of April 2010, over 3,000,000 have been sold translating to estimate amount of $30,000,000 in revenue. The Region 2 DVD was released in the UK on December 4, 2006, in PAL Widescreen and has been certified 15 by the BBFC with the following viewer guidance; Contains strong language, moderate sex and sex references. The movie was passed without any cuts.

The Region 1 DVD was released December 19, 2006 in Fullscreen R-Rated, Fullscreen Unrated, and Widescreen Unrated versions. All feature Dolby Digital 5.1 audio in English, French, and Spanish. Extras include deleted and extended scenes, outtakes, and a full-length feature commentary featuring the director, writer and cast members. The unrated DVD also contains two bonus features.

After the commercial success of the direct-to-DVD production American Pie Presents: Band Camp, Universal Studios Home Entertainment decided to produce another sequel to the American Pie film. American Pie Presents: The Naked Mile was released direct-to-video on December 19, 2006. The film was a financial success, generating US$27.41 million in DVD sales domestically.

=== Critical response ===
The review aggregator website Rotten Tomatoes reported a 0% approval rating based on 5 reviews, and an average rating of 3.2/10. Tanner Stransky of Entertainment Weekly graded the film with a "C" and wrote "although predictable, the opening stays on par with Jason Biggs’ original jaw-dropper. The rest is pretty deadly." Film critic Christopher Null wrote "I never thought I'd believe that the characters in American Pie were rich and nuanced, but compared to the disjointed, half-written affair here, they may as well be from Shakespeare." IGN's Chris Carle gave the film 3/10, writing that it's "a smorgasbord of gross-out humor, shallow laughs and bigotry." Steve Weintraub of Collider wrote "there is something to be said about comedic timing and pacing to even the most basic form of cinematic genres, neither of which this [film] grasps at all." Common Sense Media's Heather Boerner gave the film 2/5, writing that it's "another raunchy race toward the first time." Writing in DVD Talk, Scott Weinberg criticised the acting, directing and screenplay, declaring that "The Naked Mile is one of the lamest, laziest and most shockingly amateurish comedies I've ever seen". Sloan Freer of The Radio Times gave the film 2/5, writing that "even fans of teen sex comedies will find the verbal gags repetitive, predictable and often plain unfunny, while the visual jokes are dragged out to tedious levels." DVD Verdict's Eric Profancik, in his positive review, found the film was "filled with a firm, rowdy, and lascivious wit that made you smirk with its aggressive antics", in particular praising the opening scene as "stunning". Peter Hammond of Maxim describes The Naked Mile as "hilarious, sexy fun... goes where no American Pie has gone before," writing that it "goes the extra mile for laughs and gets them".

== Accolades ==
Year	Award	Category	Recipients	Result
2007	Cinema Audio Society Awards	Outstanding Achievement in Sound Mixing for DVD Original Programming	Mark A. Rozett, Kelly Vandever, Robert Scherer	Nominated

== See also ==
- Culture of Ann Arbor, Michigan
