= Search Party =

Search party is a general term referring to a group of people organized to look for someone or something that is lost. It may also refer to:

- Search Party (album), by ¡Mayday! (2017)
- Search Party (film), a 2014 American comedy film
- Search Party (TV series), a 2016 American dark comedy series
