= David H. Steinberg =

American screenwriter

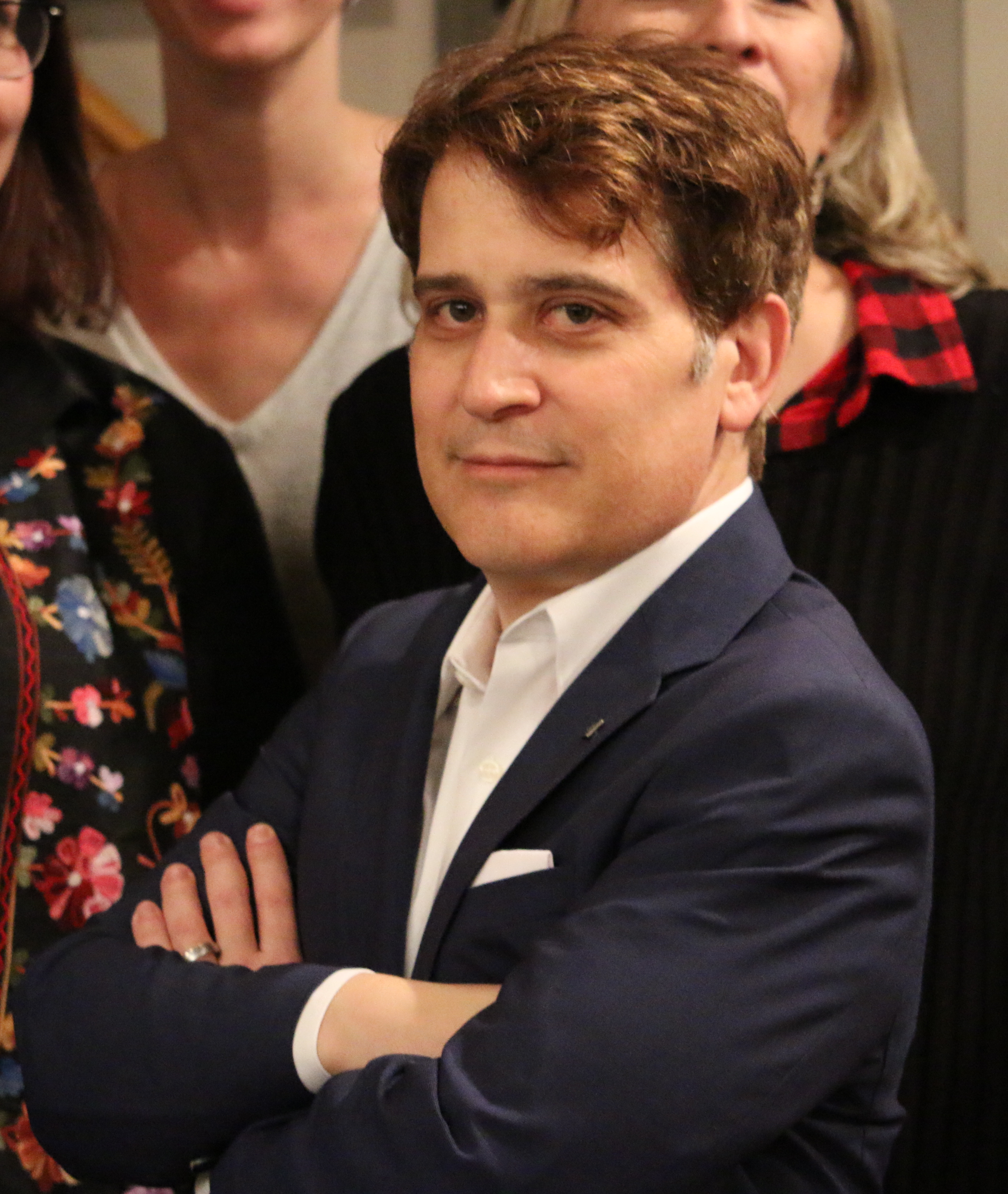
- Education: Yale University (BA); Duke University (JD); University of Southern California
- Occupations: Film director; television producer; writer

David H. Steinberg is an American writer, director, and producer for film and television. He wrote the screenplays for American Pie 2 (2001), Slackers (2002), National Lampoon's Barely Legal (2003), and American Pie Presents: The Book of Love (2009) and Girls' Rules (2020). He was also the executive producer and showrunner of the Netflix series No Good Nick (2019).

== Early life ==
Steinberg grew up in West Hartford, Connecticut, where he attended William H. Hall High School. He is Jewish.

Steinberg entered Yale University at age 16. He later earned his Juris Doctor degree from Duke University, where he served as editor-in-chief of the law review. Following his graduation from Duke Law, he clerked for Judge Jerry E. Smith of the United States Court of Appeals for the Fifth Circuit for a year. After four years of entertainment law in Atlanta and New York, he abandoned his legal career to attend USC's Peter Stark Producing Program.

== Career ==
Before graduating, Steinberg sold his first spec script called Slackers, which was made into the 2002 film. After that sale, Steinberg was immediately hired by Universal to write the first two drafts of American Pie 2.

== Filmography ==
Steinberg also wrote After School Special, a story about three high school friends who attempt to make a porn movie. The movie was eventually released under the title National Lampoon's Barely Legal. In addition, Steinberg wrote the seventh and ninth films in the American Pie series, American Pie Presents: The Book of Love in 2009 and American Pie Presents: Girls' Rules in 2020, as well as cowriting the second film, American Pie 2.

Steinberg wrote and directed the short film The Babysitter starring Academy Award winner Brie Larson, which went viral with over four million views on the now-defunct Atom Films before achieving immortal status on Funny or Die. His feature film directorial debut Miss Dial stars Robinne Lee and Sam Jaeger and premiered at the Macon Film Festival on February 16, 2013, where it received the Audience Choice Award. It was released on DVD and VOD by Phase 4 Films in 2013.

He wrote DisneyToon Studios' Tinker Bell and the Pixie Hollow Games, which premiered on the Disney Channel and the DreamWorks animated feature film Puss In Boots. He also wrote the live-action body-switching movie Furry Friday for New Line Cinemas and created and executive produced a TV pilot for ABC Family called Phys. Ed.

Steinberg has also written many other scripts for the major film studios. These include:

- Only Human, a sci-fi comedy for Sony Pictures Entertainment;
- The Fool's Errand, a family animation script he sold as a pitch to Disney;
- Other People's Wishes, a high-concept comedy for Warner Brothers;
- Love at Second Bite, the sequel to the 1979 comedy Love at First Bite;
- Sprung, a comedy for New Line Cinemas;
- Porky's, the theatrical remake of the classic 1982 comedy;
- Anubis, a family adventure movie for 20th Century Fox Animation;
- Kindergarten Cop 2;
- Bigger Fatter Liar, a sequel to the 2002 movie Big Fat Liar for Universal Studios.

In addition, his debut novel, a coming-of-age comedy, Last Stop This Town, was published in 2012.

=== The Simpsons ===
He wrote the season 25 episode "Pay Pal" for which he was nominated for a Writers Guild Award.

=== Space Racers ===
Steinberg helped create the animated pre-school series Space Racers which airs on Sprout.

=== Yo-kai Watch ===
Steinberg is the head writer on the U.S. adaptation of the hit Japanese anime series Yo-kai Watch. With his writing partner Keetgi Kogan, he wrote 77 episodes in the first three seasons which air on Disney XD.

=== No Good Nick ===
Steinberg, together with his writing partner Keetgi Kogan, created the multicam comedy No Good Nick for Netflix which stars Melissa Joan Hart and Sean Astin, released in 2019. He served as the Executive Producer and Showrunner.
