= American Pie Presents: Beta House =

2007 film by Andrew Waller

- DVD cover
- Directed by: Andrew Waller
- Written by: Erik Lindsay
- Based on: Characters by Adam Herz
- Produced by: W. K. Border
- Starring: John White; Steve Talley; Christopher McDonald; Eugene Levy
- Cinematography: Gerald Packer
- Edited by: Rod Dean; Andrew Somers
- Music by: Jeff Cardoni
- Production companies: Neo Art & Logic; Rogue Pictures
- Distributed by: Universal Studios Home Entertainment
- Release date: December 26, 2007
- Running time: 87 minutes
- Countries: United States; Canada
- Language: English
- Budget: $10 million
- Box office: $18.8 million

American Pie Presents: Beta House is a 2007 sex comedy film released by Universal Studios Home Entertainment. It is the third installment in the American Pie Presents film series, a spin-off of the American Pie franchise. John White stars as Erik Stifler, a college freshman who pledges the Beta House fraternity led by his cousin Dwight Stifler (Steve Talley). Christopher McDonald co-stars as Erik's father and Eugene Levy plays Beta House alumnus Noah Levenstein. It is a direct sequel to The Naked Mile (2006).

Universal commissioned the film after positive commercial reaction to The Naked Mile. Writer Erik Lindsay, producer W.K. Border and four of the five main cast members from the preceding film returned. Principal photography took place for seven to eight weeks from June 4, 2007, in Toronto, Ontario, Canada.

American Pie Presents: Beta House was released direct-to-DVD internationally on December 10, 2007, and in the United States on December 26, 2007. The film was a moderate financial success, generating US$18.55 million in United States sales. It received generally negative reviews from film critics.

== Plot ==
After his girlfriend Tracy dumps him for her ex-boyfriend, Trent, Erik Stifler and his friend Cooze arrive at the University of Michigan as freshmen. Erik meets a girl named Ashley and his new roommate Bobby. Erik is then welcomed by his cousin, Dwight Stifler, the leader of the Beta House fraternity; who invites Erik, Cooze and Bobby to a party.

They meet Wesley, the rush chair of Beta House, who experiences alcohol blackouts, and learn how they can become eligible to pledge for the Beta House. Dwight also informs them that the Geek House, run by wealthy nerds, has been trying to shut them down.

Erik and Ashley go on a first date at a restaurant where he accidentally spills hot soup on his lap, so she brings him to her room to clean up. As Ashley rubs lotion on Erik's thigh, he accidentally ejaculates on her belongings. Erik apologizes, explaining that, after breaking up with Tracy, he has not had an orgasm in four months, as masturbation is taboo in his house because of a previous incident.

Meanwhile, Cooze falls for Ashley's roommate Denise; however, she is nervous about having sex with him, so she gives Cooze a handjob instead. After talking with Erik, Bobby and Dwight about Denise, Cooze develops suspicions that she might have a penis.

Along with two other pledges, Erik, Cooze and Bobby complete fifty tasks to pledge the Beta House, including: getting their butts signed by a stripper, having sex with a professor, marrying a fellow pledge, and placing a live ostrich in the Geek House.

After they complete their final task (stealing something from the Geek House), Edgar, the president of their rivals, challenges the Beta House to the "Greek Olympiad", with the winners taking the loser's House. Before the competition starts, Dwight meets former enemy Rock at a hockey rink, where he learns that while attempting to rush the midget fraternity, Edgar had sex with a sheep.

Being the Olympiad's last winner, Beta House alumnus Noah Levenstein returns to campus to officiate the competition. Beta House wins the first game as Dwight and Edgar compete to remove girls' brassieres. Geek House wins the next three matches: a pugil bout turned lightsaber duel, catching a greased pig, and a two-person "69" race. Beta House wins the fifth and sixth competitions: a Russian roulette challenge between Dwight and Edgar with aged horse semen; and a beer drinking competition between all members of both Houses, ultimately won by Wesley via a keg stand.

During the final lap dance challenge, Beta House uses Edgar's sheep fetish against him with Bobby's girlfriend Margie wearing a sheep costume, which ultimately costs him and his house the tournament. Having won the Geek House mansion, the Beta House hosts a toga party.

Erik and Ashley establish their relationship and have sex. Meanwhile, Cooze and Denise finally sleep together as well, and Cooze discovers that what Denise is hiding is the fact that she ejaculates during sex, much to his excitement.

In a post-credits scene, Edgar instructs a stripper at the Silver Dollar to dance with the headpiece of the sheep costume.

== Cast ==
- John White as Erik Stifler, a freshman pledging the Beta House
- Steve Talley as Dwight Stifler, the pledgemaster and leader of the Beta House who is Erik's cousin
- Eugene Levy as Noah Levenstein, Beta House alumnus and the officiator of the Greek Olympiad
- Jake Siegel as Mike "Cooze" Coozeman, Erik's friend and a freshman pledging the Beta House alongside Erik and Bobby
- Nick Nicotera as Bobby, Erik's roommate and his friend who is a freshman pledging the Beta House with Erik and Cooze
- Meghan Heffern as Ashley Thomas, Erik's love interest
- Tyrone Savage as Edgar Willis, the leader of the Geek House and main antagonist
- Sarah Power as Denise, Cooze's love interest
- Christopher McDonald as Mr. Stifler, Erik's father
- Angela Besharah as Irene
- Jonathan Keltz as Wesley, a member and the rush chair of the Beta House
- Dan Petronijevic as Bull, a member of the Beta House
- Jordan Prentice as Rock, the former leader of a rival fraternity and Dwight's former nemesis
- Christine Barger as Margie, Bobby's girlfriend
- Bradford Anderson as Jake Parker, a member of the Geek House who uses a wheelchair
- Robbie Amell as Nick Anderson, a freshman pledging the Beta House
- Italia Ricci as Laura Johnson
- Rachel Skarsten as Sharon

== Production ==
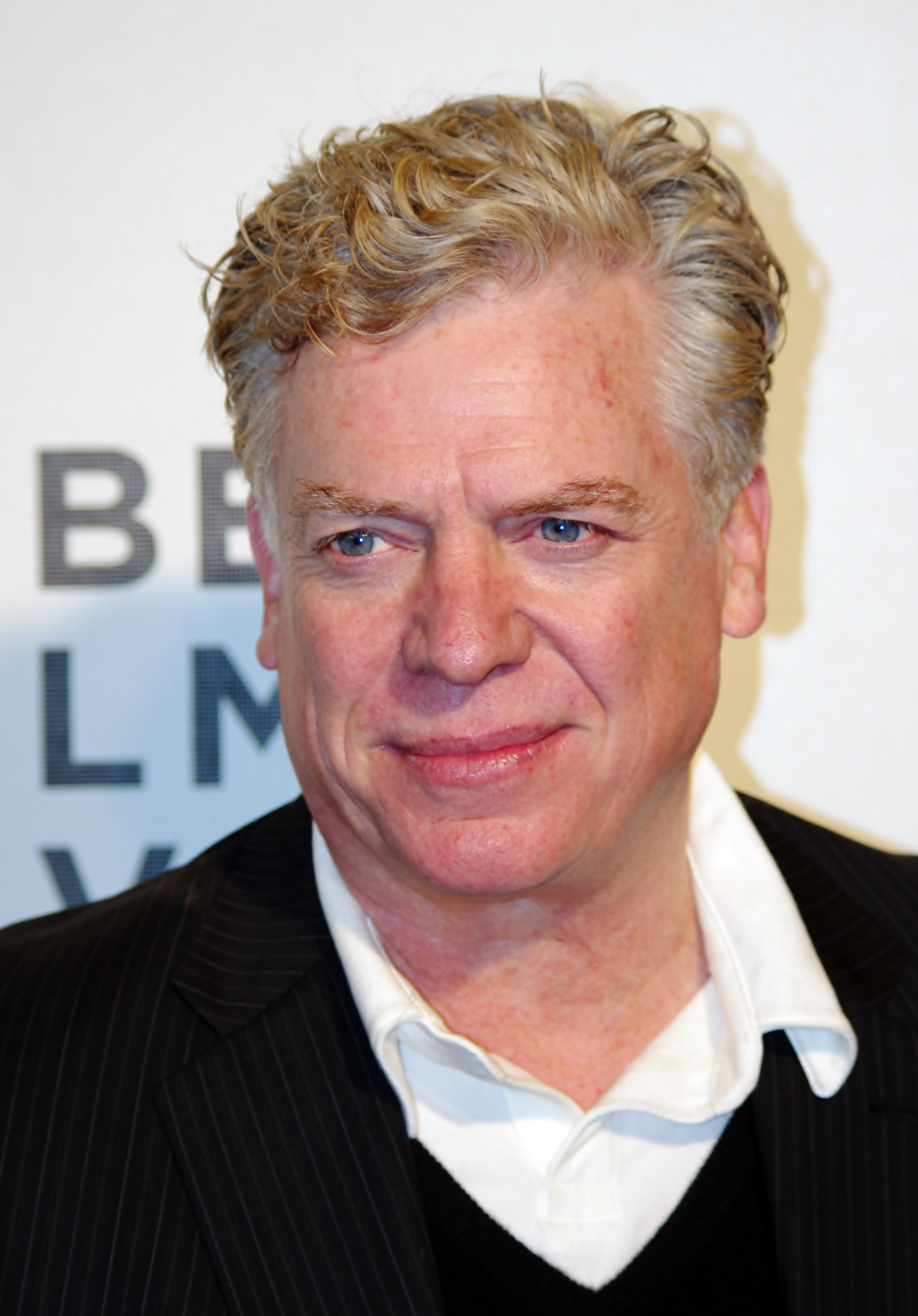
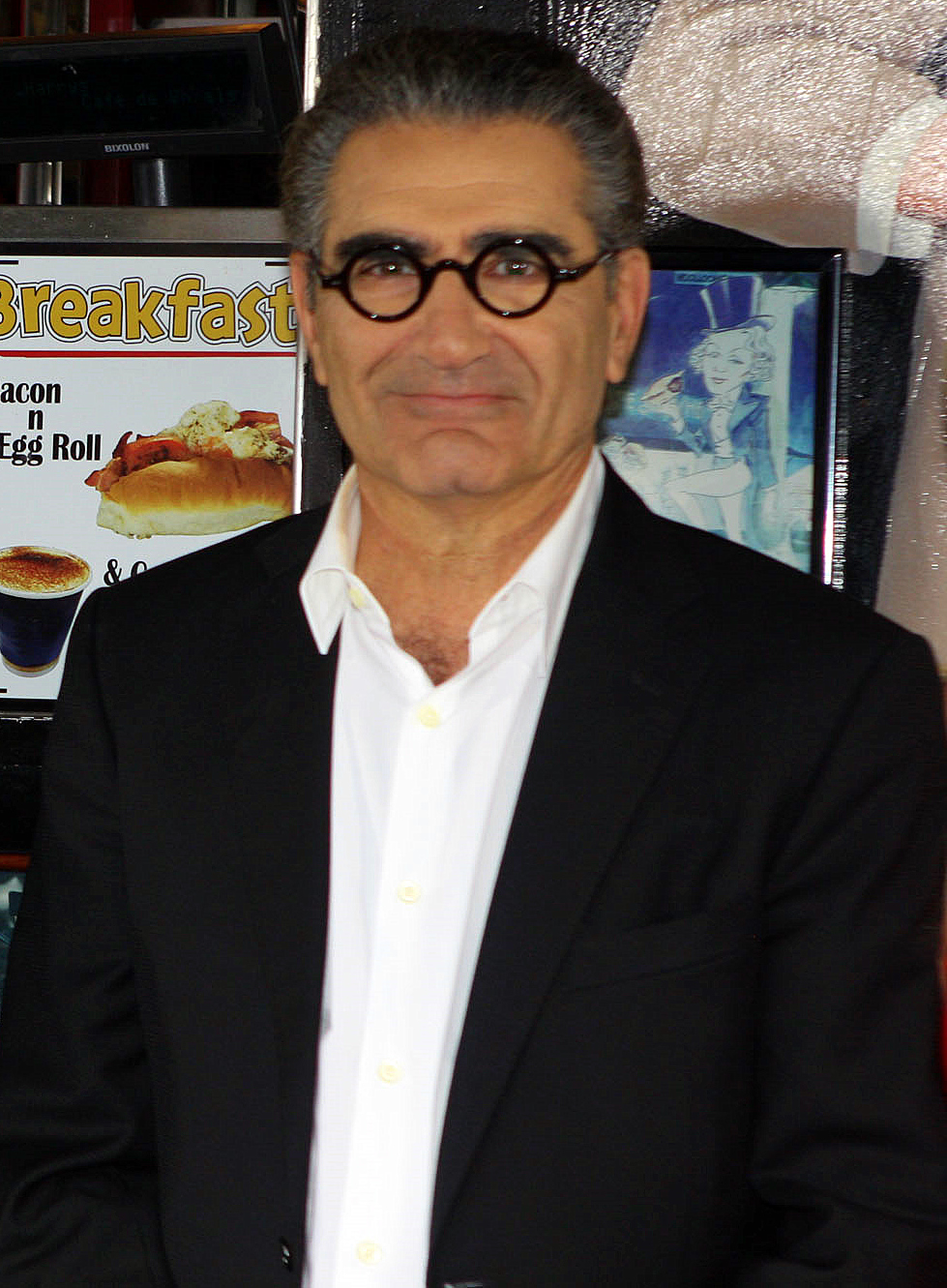
Christopher McDonald (left) and Eugene Levy reprised their roles from The Naked Mile

American Pie Presents: The Naked Mile, the second installment of the American Pie Presents film series, was a commercial success, and Universal Pictures prepared for a sequel. The Naked Mile's writer, Erik Lindsay, pitched the film by saying: "Look, we're not going to top Animal House of course, but it's been 25 years. I was in a fraternity for six years. Let's just make a straight pledging movie." Universal gave Lindsay the green light to write Beta House, and also hired Andrew Waller and The Naked Mile's producer, W. K. Border, as the film's director and producer, respectively. The film's screenplay was based on characters by Adam Herz and on aspects of Lindsay's own life. Lindsay felt that Universal being unworried about making the film similar to Animal House provided "more opportunities to keep the story organic," which he found the challenge of writing a sequel.

The film features the same principal cast as The Naked Mile are John White, Steve Talley, Christopher McDonald and Eugene Levy reprise their roles from the preceding film. Levy returned to play Noah Levenstein for his sixth time of American Pie franchise. Craig Kornblau, president of Universal Studios Home Entertainment said: "we think he [Levy] is crucial to this franchise because his character represents the heart of the movie." Jake Siegel, Jaclyn A. Smith, Dan Petronijevic and Jordan Prentice also reprise their roles from The Naked Mile.

Principal photography began on June 4, 2007, and lasted about "seven [to] eight weeks." Filming took place at the University of Toronto, Pinewood Toronto Studios and at the Brass Rail strip club in Toronto. Neo Art & Logic, Rogue Pictures and Universal Pictures produced the film on a budget of less than $10 million. The film was intended to be the center of a trilogy beginning with The Naked Mile and although talks for a concluding sequel were held, one has yet to materialise.

== Release ==
American Pie Presents: Beta House was released direct-to-DVD internationally on December 10, 2007, and in the United States on December 26, 2007. It was marketed with the tagline "the most outrageous slice of pie!" The film was released in two single-disc DVD editions. The R-rated edition included no special features, while the unrated edition included a commentary track, behind-the-scenes clips, deleted scenes and storylines, a fake service announcement, featurettes, outtakes, a mock in-character interview with Noah Levenstein, music videos by God Made Me Funky, and a 30 Rock episode. Through its first four weeks the DVD sold over 534,000 copies in the United States, generating $12.25 million in sales. Universal Pictures expected to sell more than a million units; sales have since totaled over 898,000 units in the United States, with $18.55 million in revenue.

=== Critical reception ===
The film received generally negative reviews from film critics. LaRue Cook of Entertainment Weekly graded the film with a "D" and wrote, "what was once a fresh slice of teen comedy has become a slab of stale crudeness." Scott Weinberg of Moviefone, in his negative review, found the film "slightly more amusing to sit through than the two previous entries", in particular praising the Star Trek sexual roleplay scene as "extremely effective." DVD Talk's Jeffrey Robinson writes that "if anything, it will bore you and leave you wondering why you wasted an hour and a half of your life." Writing in JoBlo.com, Adam Quigley poked fun at the film's themes, declaring that "if there's a lesson to be taken from these films, it's that women are objects, and should always be treated as such." IGN's Hock Teh gave the film 5/10, writing that it "stays very close to the American Pie formula," while criticizing the story as "devoid of anything remotely semi-compelling or even noteworthy." In a positive review, Peter Hammond of Maxim describes American Pie Presents: Beta House as "loaded with sex, laughs and raunchy fun," writing that it "may be the most outrageous slice of pie yet!"
