= Alyssa Nicole Pallett =

Canadian actress

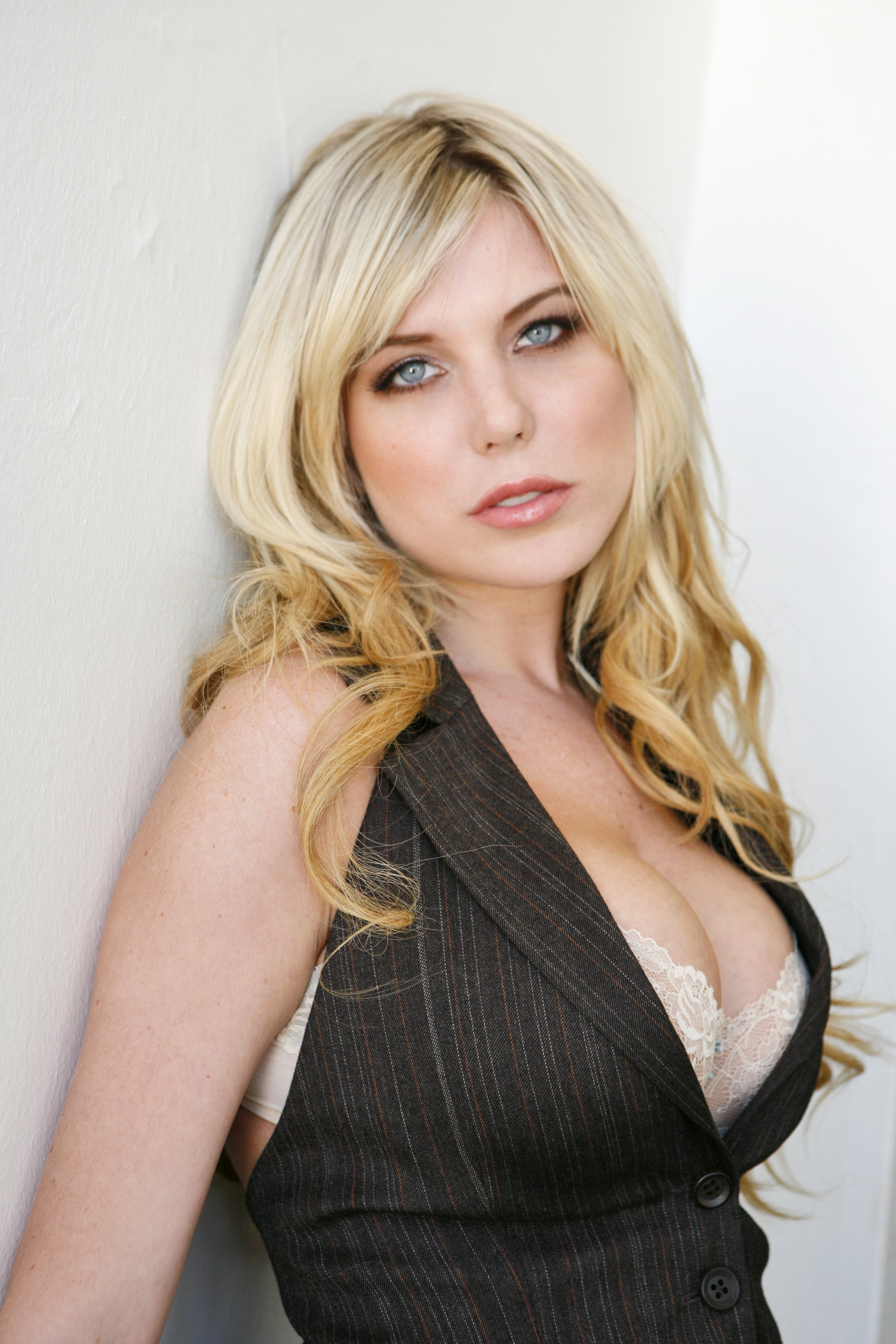
- Pallett in January 2009
- Born: Alyssa Nicole Pallett; St. John's, Newfoundland, Canada

Alyssa Nicole Pallett is a Canadian model, actress, and businesswoman. She is the former owner of "The Sweet Ones", a vintage store in New York City.

She is known for her brief career as an actress and glamour model in the United Kingdom and has been photographed by several well-known photographers, including Patrick Demarchelier and Playboy photographer Josh Ryan.

== Biography ==
Pallett was born in St. John's, Newfoundland, and grew up in Southern Ontario. She studied film-making at the New York Film Academy in London, as well as in New York City. She also studied acting in New York at the Stella Adler Conservatory.

== 'The Sweet Ones' ==
In 2009 in New York City, at the age of 24, Pallett opened 'The Sweet Ones', a vintage store in Manhattan's Lower East Side. The store drew praise from many fashion critics and was featured in magazines such as the Japanese edition of Harper's Bazaar, the Nylon Style Guide and Papermag.com. Time Out New York selected the store for its "Best Indie Shops" Issue in 2010, and it was profiled as Critics' Pick in New York magazine.

The Sweet Ones is permanently closed, having been evicted from its commercial space in 2010.

== Acting and modelling career ==
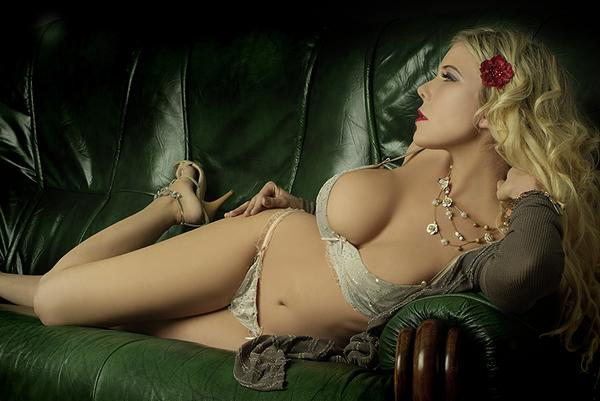

Pallett was first known for her appearance in the 2006 film American Pie Presents: The Naked Mile.

In 2008, Pallett signed with the Samantha Bond Agency in the UK, known for discovering glamour model Jordan (Katie Price) and the BBC Three television series Glamour Girls. She posed for Vogue photographer Patrick Demarchelier and, in 2009, appeared in E! Channel's The Girls Next Door after posing for Playboy's "Girls of Toronto". In January 2010, she was selected for Playboy's "Girlwatcher" interview, alongside British models such as Rosie Jones and Chanel Ryan.
