= American Pie Presents: Girls' Rules =

2020 film by Mike Elliott

- DVD cover
- Directed by: Mike Elliott
- Written by: Blayne Weaver; David H. Steinberg
- Based on: Characters by Adam Herz
- Produced by: Karen Gorodetzky; Abbey Lessanu; Joseph P. Genier; Mike Elliott
- Starring: Madison Pettis; Lizze Broadway; Piper Curda; Natasha Behnam; Darren Barnet; Zachary Gordon; Barry Bostwick; Ed Quinn; Sara Rue; Danny Trejo
- Cinematography: Damian Horan
- Edited by: Maria Friesen; Charles Norris
- Music by: Tim Jones
- Production company: Universal 1440 Entertainment
- Distributed by: Universal Pictures Home Entertainment
- Release date: October 6, 2020
- Running time: 95 minutes
- Country: United States
- Language: English

American Pie Presents: Girls' Rules is a 2020 American sex comedy film directed by Mike Elliott. It is the fifth installment of the American Pie Presents film series, a spin-off of the American Pie franchise and the ninth overall installment. It is the first film in the franchise to not feature Eugene Levy and also the first to contain no nudity. The film serves as a standalone sequel, revolving around Steve Stifler's relative Stephanie (Lizze Broadway) and her friends.

The film was released on demand and DVD on October 6, 2020, by Universal Pictures, and on Blu-ray on September 7, 2021. It received generally negative reviews from critics.

== Plot ==
Now that it is their senior year, four young friends: Annie, Kayla, Michelle and Stephanie, band together to get what they want. Annie is trying to lose her virginity to her boyfriend. Stephanie is a confident lacrosse player who is blackmailing her school's perverted principal into retiring by recording him being chained up and whipped by her. Kayla is paranoid about her boyfriend Tim cheating and constantly goes through his phone asking if she is the best girlfriend he has ever had. Michelle is a sex toy expert who prides herself on her knowledge.

The group makes a pact to get what they need this year. Along comes Grant, a handsome new guy in school. He meets Michelle first as she is rushing to class, as she is distracted by the sight of him, she runs into a door, and he helps her up.

Tim breaks up with Kayla and as Grant witnesses this, he offers help in making her ex jealous. Stephanie is playing lacrosse and meets Grant by knocking him to the ground during a play.

Michelle takes Annie to a sex shop to buy her first toy, a vibrating set of panties. Annie uses it later that day while having phone sex via laptop with her boyfriend. Grant and his mother Ellen come over to introduce themselves being new neighbors, especially Ellen to Annie's single father Kevin, who suggests Grant go upstairs to meet his daughter.

Michelle and Stephanie end up liking Grant and employ ways to win his affection. Michelle, playing the damsel in distress trips and falls into a locker in front of him. He takes her to the nurse and the nerdy principal's assistant Oliver, who has a crush on her, helps out. Stephanie goes to Grant's friend Emmett (her old friend who she had a falling out with) and asks for his help, giving him $100.

Annie runs into Grant in the library, they team up to study and slowly start falling for each other. Kayla and Tim start having sex clandestinely. As Stephanie and Emmett spend more and more time together to help her win over Grant, they start falling for each other. Things come to a head at Ellen's house party when the girls realize they all know and have crushes on Grant.

Grant says he has a crush on Annie, and they kiss. She feels guilty and goes to see her boyfriend Jason at college, where she catches him getting a blowjob. Initially angry, she feels relief because she realizes she has feelings for Grant.

Ellen helps Michelle realize that Oliver is the perfect guy for her as he also has a love of John F. Kennedy. When he does an imitation of his speech, she realizes she likes him. They all go to a party thrown by Stephanie in an attempt to get together with Grant.

Realizing that Grant likes Annie they call off the pact. A fight breaks out when Stephanie gets called a slut by a jock who when she asks him "are you telling people we hooked up" and instigates her by saying "I never said I dont kiss and tell", and Emmett defends her, which then causes Stephanie to punch the assailant and throw him out. Emmett and Stephanie kiss, realizing the whole time they had feelings for each other. Kayla and Tim get back together. Michelle and Oliver end up together.

Jason shows up and inaccurately describes the girls' pact to Grant, who leaves as he feels used. The girls all go to the pajama prom together and help Annie win back Grant. He shows up and they kiss. Their friends set up a tent on the football field so Annie can finally lose her virginity. They all end up having sex with their respective partners.

== Cast ==
- Madison Pettis as Annie
- Lizze Broadway as Stephanie Stifler
- Piper Curda as Kayla
- Natasha Behnam as Michelle
- Darren Barnet as Grant
- Zachary Gordon as Emmett
- Camaron Engels as Tim
- Zayne Emory as Jason
- Christian Valderrama as Oliver
- Sara Rue as Ellen
- Ed Quinn as Kevin
- Danny Trejo as Steve Garcia, The Janitor
- Lucas Adams as McCormick
- Patricia Elliott as MeePaw
- Barry Bostwick as PeePaw
- Rasheda Crockett as Rose
- Tatiana DeMaria as Lead Singer

== Development ==
After the success of American Pie Presents: The Book of Love, writer David H. Steinberg was hired in 2010 to write the next movie in the series entitled American Pie Presents: East Great Falls centered around four male students at East Great Falls High School who all fall in love with the same female student. However, in 2017, Universal Studios hired new writers to flip the genders of all the characters.

== Reception ==
On Rotten Tomatoes, the film has an approval rating of 33% based on reviews from 9 critics.

Robyn Bahr of The Hollywood Reporter wrote, "Dashed together by a male director, two male screenwriters, and a half-male producing team, the film appears to be the cinematic equivalent of two straight girls making out at a party for some bro's attention." Teo Bugbee of The New York Times wrote, "The original American Pie was tasteless; this version is flavorless."
