= Loni Rose =

American singer-songwriter (born 1971)

Loni Rose (born 1971) is a U.S. singer-songwriter from Seattle, Washington. Outside of the Pacific Northwest she is perhaps best known for her appearances on the soundtracks of over twenty films and television shows, including American Pie, Providence, Roswell, Jack & Jill, MTV's Road Rules, and Life Without Dick, starring Sarah Jessica Parker and Harry Connick Jr.

Her earliest commercial success was in 1993, when her track "Evergreen Christmas" landed on the annual Northwest Favorite Christmas in the Northwest CD. Evergreen Christmas has held one of the top 10 slots on Seattle's Warm 106.9 FM's Top 200 Christmas Songs Countdown. Rose continued to appear in "Christmas in the Northwest" live performances with other Christmas songs. In 1999, she won the Lilith Fair contest in Seattle with the song "I Want to Believe", appearing on that concert's village stage, where she performed alongside Sarah McLachlan and Sheryl Crow. Her popularity further increased when she won Seattle's Battle of the Girlbands in 2003, which was a contest put on by a local mainstream FM radio station, 106.1 KISS FM. Rose opened the radio station's Summer Music Festival with artists including Nelly Furtado, Vertical Horizon, and Smash Mouth.

In 1999, her song "I Never Thought You Would Come" featured in the film American Pie, and in 2005, her song "Hold On" featured in the film Love Wrecked. Her songs were also in TV series such as The 10th Kingdom, America's Next Top Model, Providence, Roswell, Jack & Jill and Road Rules. The music supervisor of Road Rules reportedly stated that Rose's song "Let Me Go Back" (played during the last scene of the 2000 finale) was the most asked about song of the series.

== Independently released albums ==
- Radio Flyer – EP (1995)
- Naked Soul (1997)
- Starlight – EP (1999, 2001, 2005)
- Shine – EP (2007)
- The Shine Sessions (2008)
- King’s Bullet, with Trey Bruce (2012)
