= Go Fish (TV series) =

American sitcom television series

- Genre: Sitcom
- Created by: Adam Herz
- Developed by: Pam Brady
- Written by: Pam Brady; Adam Herz; Phil Lord; Jeff Lowell; Christopher Miller
- Directed by: Allan Arkush; John Fortenberry; Peter Lauer; Arlene Sanford
- Starring: Kieran Culkin; Kyle Sabihy; Taylor Handley; Will Friedle; Kristin Lehman; Joe Flaherty; Molly Cheek; Andy Dick; Katherine Ellis
- Composers: Jonathan Wolff; Paul Buckley
- No. of seasons: 1
- No. of episodes: 5 (1 unaired)

Production
- Executive producers: Pam Brady; Jeff Lowell; Gene Stein; Nina Wass
- Producers: Jason Saville; Kent Zbornak
- Editors: David Rogers; Skip Collector
- Camera setup: Film; Single-camera
- Running time: 30 minutes
- Production companies: Wass/Stein Productions; Touchstone Television

Original release
- Network: NBC
- Release: June 19 – July 3, 2001

Go Fish is an American sitcom television series that aired on NBC from June 19 to July 3, 2001. The series was created by Adam Herz, developed by Pam Brady and starred Kieran Culkin in his first regular role in a television series. A total of five episodes were produced, leaving one of those five unaired.

== Plot ==
Andy Troutner (nicknamed "Fish") (Kieran Culkin) is beginning his first year of high school at Westlake High. Joining him are his two best friends Henry Krakowski (Kyle Sabihy), the so-called wise one of the group and Hazard (Taylor Handley), whose personality is defined by his name. His older brother Pete (Will Friedle) is a recent college graduate who gets a job at Fish's school. Rounding out the people in Fish's school are Ernie Hopkins (Andy Dick), their overdramatic drama teacher, Laura Eastwood (Kristin Lehman), their attractive English teacher and Jess Riley (Katherine Ellis), a beautiful girl that Fish has affections for. His home life consisted of his not so smart brain surgeon dad (Joe Flaherty) and his homemaker mother (Molly Cheek). Future stars Adam Brody and Joanna Garcia made guest appearances.

== Cast ==
- Kieran Culkin as Andy "Fish" Troutner
- Will Friedle as Pete Troutner
- Kyle Sabihy as Henry "Krak" Krakowski
- Taylor Handley as Hazard
- Kristin Lehman as Laura Eastwood
- Joe Flaherty as Dr. Frank Troutner
- Molly Cheek as Annie Troutner
- Andy Dick as Ernie Hopkins
- Katherine Ellis as Jess Riley

== Episodes ==
No.	Title	Directed by	Written by	Original release date
1	"Go Four-Point Plan"	John Fortenberry	Adam Herz & Pam Brady	June 19, 2001
2	"Go PDA"	Allan Arkush	Jeff Lowell	June 19, 2001
3	"Go Student Council"	Arlene Sanford	Jeff Lowell	June 26, 2001
4	"Go Wrestling"	Arlene Sanford	Phil Lord & Christopher Miller	July 3, 2001
5	"Go Rebel"	Peter Lauer	Adam Herz & Pam Brady	Unaired
