= Search Party (film) =

- Theatrical release poster
- Directed by: Scot Armstrong
- Screenplay by: Mike Gagerman; Andrew Waller; Scot Armstrong
- Story by: Mike Gagerman; Andrew Waller
- Produced by: Neal H. Moritz; Ori Marmur; Scot Armstrong; Ravi Nandan; Paul Brooks
- Starring: T.J. Miller; Adam Pally; Thomas Middleditch; Alison Brie; Shannon Woodward; Krysten Ritter
- Cinematography: Tim Orr
- Edited by: Sam Seig
- Music by: Craig Wedren
- Production companies: Gold Circle Entertainment; American Work; Original Film
- Distributed by: Universal Pictures (International); Focus World (United States)
- Release dates: October 30, 2014 (Netherlands); May 13, 2016 (United States)
- Running time: 93 minutes
- Country: United States
- Language: English
- Budget: $18.5 million
- Box office: $118,263

Search Party is a 2014 American comedy film directed by Scot Armstrong (in his feature directorial debut), who co-wrote the screenplay with Mike Gagerman and Andrew Waller, based on a story by Gagerman and Waller. The film stars T.J. Miller, Adam Pally, Thomas Middleditch, Alison Brie, Shannon Woodward, and Krysten Ritter.

Search Party was released in 2014 internationally, but was not released in the United States until May 13, 2016, by Focus World. The film received generally negative reviews from critics.

== Plot ==
Daniel "Nardo" Narducci (Thomas Middleditch) is having a bachelor party with his best friends, Jason (T.J. Miller) and Evan (Adam Pally). Nardo tells his friends he isn't sure he is doing the right thing while under the influence of marijuana. The next day in the middle of the wedding Jason tries to stop Nardo from getting married, which makes the bride Tracy (Shannon Woodward) storm out.

Tracy goes alone to the honeymoon vacation in Mexico. Nardo goes after her to get her back, but on his way he is carjacked and left naked. He calls Jason for help. Jason puts Evan in the car while he is asleep and heads towards Mexico. They stop in California to get a fake ID because Jason has lost his.

Nardo arrives at a town in Mexico and calls again, he is next to a wire service company and Evan offers to send him money through it. They go to a casino to meet a friend who can help them transfer the money. Evan hits on a girl in the casino, but she drugs him and takes him to a room to steal his kidney. Jason finds Evan and eventually rescues him from the criminals. While escaping, one of the criminals shoot them with burning arrows and one arrow hits the car, the car then burns and explodes.

Failing to get any money, the woman who agreed to help Nardo gets angry and he runs from her naked and jumps right into a cocaine pickup truck. When found, he is tied to a chair. At some point Nardo frees himself, jumps into the truck and drives away. He gets to see Tracy through a hotel window but before he gets to her, he gets caught by a guard and sent to jail.

After that, Nardo sends for help by making a phone call to Evan. The rescue is successful, and Nardo and Tracy get married.

== Cast ==
- T.J. Miller as Jason
- Adam Pally as Evan
- Thomas Middleditch as Daniel "Nardo" Narducci
- Lance Reddick as Cal
- Shannon Woodward as Tracy
- Alison Brie as Elisabeth
- Krysten Ritter as Christy
- Jon Glaser as Marty
- J. B. Smoove as Berk
- Jason Mantzoukas as The Amazing Hugo
- Brian Huskey as Pargo
- Rosa Salazar as Pocahontas
- Tracy Vilar as Sarah MacLachlan
- Riki Lindhome and Kate Micucci as Wedding Singer Duo

== Production ==
In March 2010, it was revealed that Sony had picked up the spec-script 'Road To Nardo' written by Andrew Waller and Mike Gagerman, with Scot Armstrong directing and producing the film. It was also announced Ravi Nandan, Neal Moritz, would produce alongside Armstrong under their Original Film banner, with Ori Mamur executive producing. In June 2011, it was revealed that T.J. Miller had been cast in the lead role of the film. In August 2011, Thomas Middleditch was cast in the film landing the title role of Nardo. In March 2013, it was revealed that Universal Pictures had acquired the film, from Sony who dropped the film. In April 2013, it was revealed that Adam Pally had joined the cast of the film. That same month, Shannon Woodward was cast in the film. In May 2013, Alison Brie joined the cast of the film.

=== Filming ===
Principal photography began on May 1, 2013, and concluded on June 27, 2013.

== Release ==
Universal Studios originally set a release date for the film for September 12, 2014, however the date was pushed back, being released in France on December 10, 2014. and in the United States on May 13, 2016.

== Reception ==
The film received poor reviews from critics. On the review aggregator website Rotten Tomatoes, 10% of 20 critics' reviews are positive, with an average rating of 3.2/10. Metacritic, which uses a weighted average, assigned the film a score of 22 out of 100, based on nine critics, indicating "generally unfavorable" reviews.
