= Dan Petronijevic =

Canadian actor (born 1981)

- Born: Daniel Petronijevic; March 28, 1981 (age 45); Scarborough, Ontario, Canada
- Occupation: Actor
- Years active: 1994–present
- Children: 4

Daniel Petronijevic (born March 28, 1981), known professionally as Dan Petronijevic, is a Canadian actor who has appeared in various feature films, including the American Pie franchise, and in TV shows such as 19-2, Playmakers, Cardinal, and Letterkenny. He also has extensive experience doing voice acting for numerous animated series. His most recent acting role was playing Detective Marv Bozwick in the film Spiral.

== Early life ==
Petronijevic was born on March 28, 1981, in Scarborough, Ontario, to Alexander Petronijevic, who is of Serbian descent. He moved with his family from Scarborough to Scugog Township as a youth. Petronijevic made his theatrical debut as a teenager in Port Perry, where he was spotted by a talent agent.

== Career ==
Petronijevic is best known for his role as the antagonistic Montreal Police Service Officer J.M. Brouillard in the English adaptation of the ensemble police drama 19-2. For that role, he was nominated "Best Performance by an Actor in a Featured Supporting Role in a Dramatic Program or Series" at the Canadian Screen Awards in 2014.

Petronijevic also won the role of Thad Guerwitcz in ESPN's 2003 sports drama Playmakers. He played a closeted professional football player who is outed by his boyfriend.

Petronijevic's other roles include Brody in Todd and the Book of Pure Evil (TV series and film) and Ronald Stiviletto in Happy Town. He also worked on the shows PSI Factor, Earth: Final Conflict, Republic of Doyle, Saving Hope, and Rookie Blue. Petronijevic played the role of Bull in the films American Pie Presents: The Naked Mile and American Pie Presents: Beta House. Along with Malin Åkerman, he co-starred in Cottage Country. Other films he has appeared in include Angel Eyes with Jennifer Lopez and The Prince and Me with Julia Stiles respectively.

Petronijevic had the recurring role of McMurray in the Canadian sitcom Letterkenny, a series which was created by his fellow 19-2 actor Jared Keeso. He also co-stars in the second season of the crime drama Cardinal as the drug enforcer Leon.

Petronijevic is also a prolific voice actor, having worked on numerous animated television series. He voiced and sang as the character Geoff in Total Drama Island, Total Drama Action, and Total Drama World Tour. He later reprised the role in the spin-off series Total Drama Presents: The Ridonculous Race. He voiced Adam Spitz in the cartoon series Braceface. He has also played several characters on the show Bakugan including those of Spectra, Julio Santana, and Jake Vallory. Other characters include Tarantula Boy on Growing Up Creepie, Corey on 6teen, GT on Turbo Dogs and most recently Trent Trotter on Corn & Peg.

Petronijevic also plays the role of Erik in Di-Gata Defenders. He is a voice actor in Beyblade: Metal Fusion, performing the roles of Blader DJ, Dynamis and Dashan Wang. He provided the voice over narration in Beyblade: Shogun Steel and BeyWarriors: BeyRaiderz.

From 2007 to 2023, he was the official announcer for the Teletoon network. He was replaced with an unknown female announcer since March 27, 2023, when the channel rebranded to Cartoon Network Canada.

== Filmography ==
=== Film ===
Year	Title	Role	Notes
2001	High Explosive	Tom Randall	
2001	Angel Eyes	Fighting Kid	
2002	The Circle	Bully #1	
2004	The Prince & Me	Rathskeller Bouncer	
2006	Snapshots for Henry	Tim	Short film
2006	American Pie Presents: The Naked Mile	Bull	
2007	American Pie Presents: Beta House	Bull	
2010	Harm's Way	Luke	
2013	Cottage Country	Salinger Chipowski	
2015	He Never Died	Steve	
2017	Todd and the Book of Pure Evil: The End of the End	Brody (voice)	Animated film
2021	Spiral	Detective Marv "Boz" Bozwick	
2026	The Snake	Davey Danger	

=== Television ===
Year	Title	Role	Notes
1994	To Save the Children	Ray Larch	TV movie
1995	Are You Afraid of the Dark?	Scott	1 episode
1995	Flash Forward	Joey Rizzo	1 episode
1996	Goosebumps	Joey Ferris	1 episode
1996	Night of the Twisters	Tough Guy	TV movie
1996	Hostile Advances: The Kerry Ellison Story	Tim	TV movie
1996	Hidden in America	Kenny	TV movie
1996	Ready or Not	Trevor	1 episode
1997	In His Father's Shoes	Dennis Beck	TV movie
1998	Blind Faith	Jack Hagan	TV movie
1998	Dream House	Michael Thornton	TV movie
1999	Animorphs	Gerald	1 episode
1999	PSI Factor: Chronicles of the Paranormal	Gerald Duvaney	1 episode
1999	Gift of Love: The Daniel Huffman Story	Mike	TV movie
2000	Power Play		1 episode
2000	Wind at My Back	Shooter	1 episode
2001	Jett Jackson: The Movie	Tank Wilson	TV movie
2001	My Horrible Year!	Eugene "Mouse" Donovan	TV movie
2001	Dangerous Child	Luke	TV movie
2002	Earth: Final Conflict	Eric Delmonico	1 episode
2002	Two Against Time	Tommy	TV movie
2002	Witchblade		1 episode
2002	The Eleventh Hour AKA Bury the Lead	Dale	1 episode
2003	Soldier's Girl	Colin Baker	TV movie
2003	Twelve Mile Road	Tony	TV movie
2003	Playmakers	Thad Guerwitcz	8 episodes
2003	Word of Honor	Young Kalahane	TV movie
2004	The Grid	Shane Billups	TV Mini Series
2005	Kojak	Denny	1 episode
2005	Our Fathers	Young Spags	TV movie
2005	Code Breakers	Corely	TV movie
2006	Absolution	Ben Lloyd	TV movie
2007	'Til Death Do Us Part AKA Love You to Death	Dennis Rafferty	1 episode
2007	The Dresden Files	D.W. Herrick	1 episode
2007	The Company	Young CIA Officer	TV Mini Series, 6 episodes
2008	Mayerthorpe	Eric Medford	TV movie
2008	M.V.P.	Tony Rizelli	1 episode
2008	For the Love of Grace	Murph	TV movie
2008	The Border	Corporal Zachariah Metski	1 episode
2009	Carny	Luke	TV movie
2009	The Line	Wayne	2 episodes
2009	Throwing Stones	Glen Boshyk	TV movie
2010	Happy Town	Ronald Stiviletto	7 episodes
2010-2012	Todd and the Book of Pure Evil	Brody	21 episodes
2011	Murdoch Mysteries	Mr. Skinner	1 episode
2011	Falling Skies	Billy	1 episode
2011	Against the Wall	Charlie Hughes	1 episode
2012	Republic of Doyle	Brodie	1 episode
2012	Saving Hope	Todd Fahey	1 episode
2012	Rookie Blue	Dale Curry	1 episode
2013	Played	Alex Lydon	1 episode
2014	Bitten	Samuel Boggs	2 episodes
2014-2017	19-2	J.M. Brouillard	35 episodes
2016-2023	Letterkenny	McMurray	37 episodes
2018	Cardinal	Leon	6 episodes
2020	Transplant	Officer Brent	1 episode: S01E09 "Under Pressure"
2021	Hudson & Rex	Coach Peters	1 episode
2024–present	The Trades	Backwoods	

=== Animated series ===
- 2000 Butt-Ugly Martians (Voice)
- 2001–2004 Braceface (Voice)
- 2002 Moville Mysteries (Voice)
- 2004 6teen (Voice)
- 2006 Growing Up Creepie (Voice)
- 2006–2007 Di-Gata Defenders (Voice)
- 2006–2008 Bigfoot Presents: Meteor and the Mighty Monster Trucks (Voice)
- 2007 Bakugan Battle Brawlers (English Voice)
- 2007 Total Drama Island (Voice)
- 2007–2010 Magi-Nation (Voice)
- 2009 The Amazing Spiez (Voice)
- 2009 Total Drama Action (Voice)
- 2010 The Adventures of Chuck and Friends (Voice)
- 2010–2011 Turbo Dogs (Voice)
- 2012 Beyblade: Shogun Steel (English Voice)
- 2011–2012 Redakai (Voice)
- 2009 Beyblade: Metal Fusion (English Voice)
- 2010 Total Drama World Tour (Voice)
- 2013 Fish 'n' Chips: The Movie (Voice)
- 2014–2017 Trucktown (Voice)
- 2015 Total Drama Presents: The Ridonculous Race (Voice)
- 2018–2023 Bakugan: Battle Planet (English Voice)
- 2019–2020 Corn & Peg (Voice)
- 2019–2021 Norman Picklestripes (Voice)
- 2021 Battle Game in 5 Seconds (English Voice)
