= Christine Barger =

American actress

Christine Barger (born 1980) is an American entertainer originally from Indiana. Barger has made appearances as a ventriloquist on television shows including Penn & Teller Fool Us, as well as gaining an internet following with her puppets on social media platforms such as TikTok, YouTube and Likee. As an actress she is best known for her roles of Margie in American Pie Presents Beta House and Dana Buckowski in iCarly.

In the niche market of Escape Rooms and Haunted Attractions, she is better known as “The Haunt Girl” also the title of her decade old blog on the subject. After establishing herself as an expert in that community, she and her partner created the 13th Basement escape room at their company Exit Game in Anaheim, California.
