= Yesterdog =

Grand Rapids hot dog restaurant

Coordinates: 42°57′20.24″N 85°37′57.35″W

- Company type: Private
- Industry: Fast food
- Founded: 1976; 50 years ago
- Founder: Bill Lewis
- Headquarters: Grand Rapids, MI, USA
- Number of locations: 1
- Area served: Grand Rapids, MI
- Key people
- Products: Hot dogs
- Owner: Bill Lewis
- Website: https://www.yesterdoggrandrapids.com/

Yesterdog is a restaurant that specializes in hot dogs located in Eastown, Grand Rapids, Michigan. The restaurant is known for being the model for the restaurant hangout of the characters in American Pie.

== History ==
Yesterdog was founded in 1976 in Eastown by Bill Lewis. By 2008, Bill Lewis, a former Mr. Fables employee, apparently owns the Mr. Fables trademark and would be allowed access to the Mr. Fables secret recipes if he wished to restart the Mr. Fables restaurant. In February 2008, the Yesterdog building's windows were blown out by a gas explosion in a building across the street. In the April 2010 issue of Esquire magazine, the restaurant was named one of "among great spots around the country 'Where Men Eat.'" The eatery cited its 8% increase in 2011 sales to the auto bailout and the June 2011 stop of Barack Obama's reelection campaign.

The fictional restaurant hangout of the characters in the 1999 film American Pie, "Dog Years", is based on Yesterdog.

== Awards ==
- 2010 Townie Award for Best Hot Dog
- 2011 Townie Awards
  - Best Hot Dog: Gold
  - Best Place to Eat Cheap: Gold
- 2011 Best of Grand Rapids Readers Poll: Coney Dog - The best
- 2012 Townie Best Hot Dog Gold Award

== See also ==
- American Pie
