= Jax Smith =

Canadian actress

- Born: Jaclyn A. Smith; Toronto, Ontario, Canada
- Occupation: Actress
- Years active: 2006–present

Jaclyn "Jax" A. Smith is a Canadian actress from Toronto, Ontario.

== Biography ==
She has worked in television, film and theater. She has appeared as a guest-star on the hit sci-fi television series Eureka and as Jill (aka "Jill the Thrill") alongside actor Eugene Levy in two American Pie direct-to-video spin-offs, The Naked Mile and Beta House. She is also featured in the latter's deleted scenes section, entitled "Lightning Bolts of Zeus."

Smith appeared as Joan of Arx on Canada's Space Channel. Other television credits include 72 Hours: True Crime. She has performed for the stage with the Soulpepper Theatre Company, Motley Theater Company, Festival of Original Theater, Not 2B Confused, Players Academy and Artists Play Showcase. Smith is also a professional dancer, having studied with the Toronto Dance Theatre, American Ballet Theatre and Kirov Academy of Ballet.

Smith organized and hosted an Earth Hour 2008 event in Vancouver. The event had over 150 attendees and was broadcast live online. She also wrote, produced, directed, and starred in an Earth Hour public service announcement/music video Flicking The Lights Off. which made its debut on the Vancouver talk show Urban Rush, was screened at the 2008 Projecting Change Vancouver Green Film Festival, the Celluloid Social Club and Vancouver's Car Free Community Fest.

== Filmography ==
=== Film ===
==== As actor ====
Year	Title	Role	Notes
2006	American Pie Presents: The Naked Mile	Jill	
2006	Tightrope	Street Walker	Short film
2007	American Pie Presents: Beta House	Jill	
2010	Glow	Tessa	Short film
2011	Gone	Mrs. Channing	Television film

==== As filmmaker ====
Year	Title	Director	Writer	Producer	Notes
2010	Glow	No	Co-writer	No	
2017	Mental	Yes	Co-writer	Executive	
2017	The Stakeout	Yes	No	No	
2018	Three Feathers	No	Editor	No	
2019	Turning the Tables	Yes	Yes	Yes	
2021	Liminal Spaces: A Digital Play Trilogy	No	Co-writer	No	

=== Television ===
Year	Title	Role	Notes
2006	72 Hours: True Crime	Candice Fonagy	Episode: "Good Doctor"
2008	Eureka	Grace	Episode: "What About Bob?"
2011	Hiccups	Store Clerk	Episode: "Hypnofish"
