= Eastown, Grand Rapids =

Neighborhood in Grand Rapids, Michigan

Coordinates: 42°57′20″N 85°37′54″W

Corner of Lake Drive and Wealthy Street

Eastown is a 70 square block neighborhood in Grand Rapids, Michigan. The population per the 2020 U.S. Census is 4,580.

Described sometimes as the Greenwich Village of Grand Rapids, it is considered a liberal oasis in a generally conservative area.

Today a walkable mixed-use neighborhood, Eastown began as a streetcar commuter suburb, midway between downtown Grand Rapids and the resort area of Reeds Lake. Eastown has an active community association, business association, and neighborhood newsletter.

Located between the affluent suburb of East Grand Rapids and the area of Grand Rapids formerly redlined for African Americans, Eastown has a majority-white, but racially mixed population.

== Places of interest ==
The city's Wilcox Park includes a playground, splash pad, basketball and tennis courts, a pavilion, hammock stands, and grass and wooded areas. Coldbrook Creek connects the park to the Aquinas College campus. Eastown is also home to Yesterdog, a popular hot dog restaurant that has been in operation since 1976.

== Location ==
McKendree Jewelers/Chez Olga's

The neighborhood is bounded on the north by Fulton Street, on the east by the city border with East Grand Rapids, on the south by Martin Luther King Street, and on the west by Fuller Avenue. The center of the neighborhood is the main business district surrounding the five-way intersection of Wealthy Street, Lake Drive, and Norwood Avenue.

== 2008 explosion ==
On February 26, 2008, a 140-year-old building in the main business district exploded due to a gas leak, injuring seven people. Residents throughout the neighborhood felt shock waves. The building collapsed into rubble, sending 20-foot flames into the air and destroying all the local businesses housed within.
