= Molly Cheek =

American actress

- Education: Connecticut College
- Occupation: Actress
- Years active: 1979–2012
- Known for: It's Garry Shandling's Show; Harry and the Hendersons

Molly Cheek is an American actress. A Connecticut College graduate, she worked in "dinner-theater productions and summer stock" before finding television and film work.

Cheek is best known for her roles in the television sitcoms as Nancy Bancroft on It's Garry Shandling's Show (1986–1990), and as Nancy Henderson on Harry and the Hendersons (1991–1993). She also had main roles in a number of short-lived television shows, and guest starred on St. Elsewhere, Diagnosis Murder, Family Ties, Murder, She Wrote, Once and Again, and Cold Case.

Cheek played the mother of main character Jim Levenstein in the 1999 film American Pie and in its sequels. She also has appeared in films Purple People Eater (1988), April's Shower (2003), A Lot like Love (2005), Good Time Max (2007), and Drag Me to Hell (2009).

== Filmography ==
=== Film ===
Year	Title	Role	Notes
1985	Deadly Intruder	Jessie	
1988	Purple People Eater	Mrs. Orfus	
1993	Stepmonster	Abby Dougherty	Video
1998	Smoke Signals	Penny Cicero	
1999	American Pie	Jim's Mom	
2001	American Pie 2	Jim's Mom	
2003	American Wedding	Jim's Mom	
2003	April's Shower	Franny	
2004	Spider-Man 2	Society Woman	
2005	A Lot like Love	Christine	
2007	Good Time Max	Carol	
2007	Cougar Club	Mrs. Holmes	
2009	Drag Me to Hell	Trudy Dalton	
2009	Where Do the Balloons Go?	Mary	Short
2009	Sick Chick	Jen	Short
2011	Low Fidelity	Lynn	
2012	American Reunion	Jim's Mom	

=== Television ===
Year	Title	Role	Notes
1979	Torn Between Two Lovers	Sherry Sanders	TV film
1979	Breaking Up Is Hard to Do	Kate	TV film
1980	The Yeagers	Carrie Yeager	"The Strong Survive", "The Neighbors"
1980	To Find My Son	Julie	TV film
1980	Mark, I Love You	Jeanne	TV film
1981	CHiPs	Pam	"11–99: Officer Needs Help"
1981	Dynasty	Doris	"Oil", "The Bordello"
1982	Chicago Story	Megan Powers	Main role; 13 episodes
1982	St. Elsewhere	Leslie Stevenson	"Tweety and Ralph"
1983	The Powers of Matthew Star	Marla Evans	"Matthew Star D.O.A."
1984	Simon & Simon	Shannon Trammel	"Harm's Way"
1984	Finder of Lost Loves	Margaret Keller	"Portraits"
1984	Hardcastle and McCormick	Cyndy Wenzek	"Never My Love"
1985	Hardcastle and McCormick	Diane Templeton	"Games People Play"
1985	T. J. Hooker	Lee Stockwell	"Serial Murders"
1985	A Summer to Remember	Trish	TV film
1985	Family Ties	Frances Wilder	"The Old College Try"
1986–1990	It's Garry Shandling's Show	Nancy Bancroft	Main role; 71 episodes
1990	Beanpole	Wanda Pinkerton	TV pilot
1990	Murder, She Wrote	Anne Stephenson	"Trials and Tribulations"
1991	Good Sports	Nina Logan	"Pros and Ex-Cons"
1991–1993	Harry and the Hendersons	Nancy Henderson	Main role; 72 episodes
1993	Family Dog	Bev Binsford	Main role; 10 episodes
1995	Ellen	Sylvia	"The Spa"
1995	Step by Step	Coach Harris	"Maid to Order"
1998	The Tony Danza Show	Laura Taylor	"Vision Quest"
1998	Beyond Belief: Fact or Fiction	Tom's Wife	"The Gun"
1999	Once and Again	Nancy	"The Scarlet Letter Jacket"
1999	Locust Valley	Mrs. Mancini	TV film
2000	Diagnosis: Murder	Anita Tashman	"Jake's Women"
2000	Sabrina, the Teenage Witch	Mrs. Cavanaugh	"Sabrina's Perfect Christmas"
2001	Go Fish	Annie Troutner	Main role; 5 episodes
2003	Happy Family	Diane Michaelson	"Dinner with Friends"
2003	Judging Amy	Cecile	"The Wrong Man"
2003	Hope & Faith	Molly	"About a Book Club"
2004	Becker	Donna	"Subway Story"
2004	Married to the Kellys	Patty Evans	"The Contractor"
2004	Cold Case	Gretchen Culliver	"The Boy in the Box"
2006	Without a Trace	Teri Lawson	"911"
2007	General Hospital: Night Shift	Marion Moore	"Paternity Ward", "Bed, Bath and Be Gone"
2012	New Girl	Marion	"Menzies"
