= Jordan Prentice =

Canadian actor

- Born: January 30, 1973 (age 53); London, Ontario, Canada
- Occupation: Actor
- Years active: 1986, 1996–present

Jordan Prentice (born January 30, 1973) is a Canadian actor. A self-described "person of short stature", he is known for his portrayal of Rock in American Pie Presents: The Naked Mile and American Pie Presents: Beta House, Jimmy in In Bruges, and for appearing in the music videos for Vengaboys' "Shalala Lala" and the Bloodhound Gang's "The Bad Touch." He was also one of the actors to play Howard the Duck. He is the lead actor in Toronto playwright Eric Woolfe's Revenger's Medicine Show which is currently in development by Eldritch Theatre.

Prentice attended École Alexandra public school. He developed an interest in acting when he was a child and was 13 when he played in Howard the Duck. He attended London Central Secondary School under the Module scolaire de langue française. Later, he attended Dalhousie University and was a member of the Young Players from the Drama Program, Department of English at the University of Western Ontario.

Prentice appeared on British television in a series of nine commercials for British radio station Absolute Radio, with DJ Christian O'Connell, as Doug, the station's new music-mad security guard with attitude.

He currently resides in Montreal, Quebec.

== Filmography ==
=== Film ===
Year	Title	Role	Notes
1986	Howard the Duck	Howard T. Duck	Additional suit performer
2001	Wolf Girl	Fingers Finnian	
2003	Love, Sex and Eating the Bones	Vendor	
2004	Harold & Kumar Go to White Castle	Giant Bag of Weed	
2005	The Life and Hard Times of Guy Terrifico	Reggie	
2006	American Pie Presents: The Naked Mile	Rock	
2007	American Pie Presents: Beta House	Rock	
2007	Weirdsville	Martin	
2008	In Bruges	Jimmy	
2011	Silent But Deadly	Sheriff Shelby	
2011	An Insignificant Harvey	Harvey Lippe	
2012	Mirror Mirror	Napoleon	
2013	The Power of Few	Brown	
2013	Empire of Dirt	Warren	
2014	The 11th Hour	Petit	
2016	At Eye Level	Tom Lambrecht	German title: Auf Augenhöhe

=== Television ===
Year	Title	Role	Notes
2000	The War Next Door	Charlie Soloman	1 episode
2005	G-Spot	Small person stand-in	1 episode
2010	Aaron Stone	Mr. Galapagos	
2010	The Night Before the Night; Before Christmas	Nigel Thumb	TV movie
2010	Lost Girl	Valentine	
2013	Sam & Cat	Hector	1 episode
