= Rogue Pictures =

American film production company

Rogue
- Company type: Subsidiary
- Industry: Motion picture
- Founded: April 2, 1998; 28 years ago
- Founder: Matt Wall; Patrick Gunn
- Successor: Universal Pictures; Focus Features
- Headquarters: Universal City, California, United States
- Key people: Ryan Kavanaugh (president)
- Parent: October Films (1998–1999); Focus Features (2004–2009); Relativity Media (2009–present)

Rogue (originally Rogue Pictures) is an American film distributor founded in 1998 by Matt Wall and Patrick Gunn. It originally started off as a genre film label of the Universal Pictures-affiliated independent film studio October Films and was based in Universal City, California.

It was owned by October Films from 1998 to 1999, after which October was sold to USA Networks and merged with Interscope Communications and Gramercy Pictures to form USA Films. In 2004, Rogue was revived by Focus Features, which retained the studio until 2009, when it was acquired by Relativity Media, which declared its second and final bankruptcy in 2018.

== History ==
=== Original October Films era (1998–1999) ===
On April 2, 1998, Rogue Pictures was formed as a division of the Universal Pictures' independent film label October Films, led by Patrick Gunn and Matt Wall, in order to release genre films to compete with Miramax's Dimension Films label. Rogue's theatrical releases, much in the same manner like Dimension did, would be handled by its parent company October Films, with video and television sales handled by October Films' parent company Universal, and all foreign sales would be handled by fellow Universal subsidiary Good Machine.

One of the first film projects/script acquisitions greenlit by Rogue was the film Cherry Falls, while the first acquisition via the Rogue label was the film Orgazmo, although PolyGram Video handled the video rights of the film. The Rogue name was dropped in 1999 after October Films was absorbed into USA Films following the merger with Interscope Communications and Gramercy Pictures.

=== Focus Features era (2004–2009) ===
In 2004, the name and branding was revived as part of the Universal-owned Focus Features, with a goal of "high-quality suspense, action, thriller and urban features with mainstream appeal and franchise potential". The revived Rogue Pictures would be led by the same team who led the Focus Features group, rather than having its own dedicated staff.

In 2005, Universal expanded the company's operations to become a stand-alone division with a new goal of releasing ten films annually. Later that year, Universal and Rogue signed a deal with newly formed Intrepid Pictures to produce, co-finance, and distribute films for five years. In 2007, distribution and marketing of Rogue Pictures films were moved to Universal in company-wide shifts to accommodate Focus Features, putting Rogue Pictures under greater control of the parent company.

=== Relativity Media era (2008–2018) ===
Rogue Pictures logo, used from 2004 to 2010

In 2008, Relativity Media approached Universal about buying the company, a move described in the entertainment media as "bold." The following year, Relativity completed acquisition of the company. This deal was part of Relativity Media reupping its agreement with Universal Pictures that would extend until 2015, and Universal would retain a distribution stake in future Rogue films. On May 7, 2009, Relativity decided to turn the Rogue branding into a consumer brand that was used by the studio.

In June 2012, Rogue and Relativity Media sold 30 of their films to Manchester Library Company, which was acquired by Vine Alternative Investments in April 2017.

== Films ==
Title	Release date	Notes
Division of October Films / Universal Pictures
Orgazmo	October 23, 1998	U.S. distribution only; produced by Kuzui Enterprises and MDP Worldwide
Thick as Thieves	January 28, 1999	distribution only; rights now owned by Samuel Goldwyn Films
Trippin'	May 12, 1999	distribution only; produced by Beacon Pictures
Boricua's Bond	June 21, 2000	distributed by USA Films
Cherry Falls	October 20, 2000	co-production with Industry Entertainment and Fresh Produce Company; distributed by USA Films
Subsidiary of Focus Features
Shaun of the Dead	September 24, 2004	North American distribution only; produced by StudioCanal, Working Title Films and Big Talk Productions; distributed internationally by Universal Pictures
Seed of Chucky	November 12, 2004	co-production with David Kirschner Productions and La Sienega Productions
Assault on Precinct 13	January 19, 2005	co-production with Why Not Productions, Liaison Films and Biscayne Pictures
Unleashed	May 13, 2005	North American distribution only; produced by EuropaCorp, Danny the Dog, Ltd., TF1 Films, Qian Yang International, Current Entertainment and Canal+
Carlito's Way: Rise to Power	September 7, 2005	direct-to-video
Cry Wolf	September 16, 2005	co-production with Hypnotic
House of Voices	October 18, 2005	North American distribution only
American Pie Presents: Band Camp	December 26, 2005	direct-to-video
Dave Chappelle's Block Party	March 3, 2006	distribution only; produced by Bob Yari Productions, Pilot Boy, Kabuki Brothers Films and Partizan Films
Waist Deep	June 23, 2006	co-production with Intrepid Pictures, Radar Pictures and RSVP Productions
Fearless	September 22, 2006	North American distribution only; produced by Hero China International
The Return	November 10, 2006	co-production with Intrepid Pictures, Raygun and Biscayne Pictures
Altered	December 19, 2006	direct-to-video
American Pie Presents: The Naked Mile	December 19, 2006	direct-to-video
The Hitcher	January 19, 2007	co-production with Intrepid Pictures and Platinum Dunes
Hot Fuzz	April 20, 2007	North American distribution only; produced by StudioCanal, Working Title Films and Big Talk Productions; distributed internationally by Universal Pictures
Balls of Fury	August 29, 2007	co-production with Intrepid Pictures and Spyglass Entertainment
American Pie Presents: Beta House	December 26, 2007	direct-to-video
White Noise 2	January 8, 2008	direct-to-video; U.S. distribution only; produced by Gold Circle Films
Doomsday	March 14, 2008	co-production with Intrepid Pictures, Crystal Sky Pictures and Scion Films
The Strangers	May 30, 2008	co-production with Intrepid Pictures, Vertigo Entertainment and Mandate Pictures
Subsidiary of Relativity Media
The Unborn	January 9, 2009	co-production with Platinum Dunes and Phantom Four Films
The Last House on the Left	March 13, 2009	co-production with Craven/Maddalena Films, Crystal Lake Entertainment, Scion Films and Midnight Entertainment
Fighting	April 24, 2009	co-production with Misher Films
A Perfect Getaway	August 7, 2009	co-production with QED International
MacGruber	May 21, 2010	co-production with Michaels/Goldwyn
Catfish	September 17, 2010	
My Soul to Take	October 8, 2010	co-production with Corvus Corax
Skyline	November 12, 2010	co-production with Hydraulx Entertainment, Transmission and Rat Entertainment
The Warrior's Way	December 3, 2010	North American distribution only; produced by Boram Entertainment
Season of the Witch	January 7, 2011	co-production with Atlas Entertainment
Take Me Home Tonight	March 4, 2011	co-production with Imagine Entertainment; distributed by Relativity Media in the United States and Universal Pictures internationally
Limitless	March 18, 2011	co-production with Virgin Produced
Cost of a Soul	May 20, 2011	
Shark Night	September 2, 2011	U.S. distribution only; produced by Incentive Filmed Entertainment, Sierra Pictures, Next Entertainment and Silverwood Films
Movie 43	January 25, 2013	co-production with Virgin Produced, GreeneStreet Films and Charles B. Wessler Entertainment
The Disappointments Room	September 9, 2016	co-production with Los Angeles Media Fund, Media Talent Group and Demarest
Independent company
The Strangers: Prey at Night	March 9, 2018	distributed by Aviron Pictures
Subsidiary of Relativity Media
Violet	October 29, 2021	
The Dutchman	January 2, 2026	
