= John White (actor) =

Canadian film, television and commercial actor

- Born: June 10, 1981 (age 44); Toronto, Ontario, Canada
- Occupation: Actor
- Years active: 1994–present

John Michael White (born June 10, 1981) is a Canadian actor. He is best known for his role as Erik Stifler in American Pie Presents: The Naked Mile (2006) and its sequel, American Pie Presents: Beta House (2007). He also had a main role on the children's television series The Adventures of Shirley Holmes (1997–2000).

== Career ==
He began acting during the mid-1990s, appearing on the television series Goosebumps, in The Cuckoo Clock of Doom and The Haunted Mask II episodes, and on The Adventures of Shirley Holmes, among others. John also began to appear in various TV movies and commercials during this time in his career, while still living in Toronto, Ontario. After moving to Los Angeles, John began to appear in higher profile projects, most notably for his role as Erik Stifler in American Pie Presents: The Naked Mile and American Pie Presents: Beta House.

== Filmography ==
=== Film ===
Feature films
Year	Title	Role	Notes
1995	Johnny and Clyde	Johnny	Television film
1995	Tails You Live, Heads You're Dead	Kevin Quint	Television film
1996	Call of the Wild	Additional voices (voice)	
1996	The Legend of Gator Face	Danny	
1996	The Adventures of Moby Dick	Additional voices (voice)	
1998	The Fixer	Johnny	Television film
2000	Manhattan Chase	Cop	
2001	Haven	Ben Billingsley	Television film
2001	After the Harvest	Charlie Gare	Television film
2003	Fast Food High	Adam	
2003	How to Deal	Michael Sherwood	
2003	Friday Night	Eric	Short film
2004	She's Too Young	Brad	Television film
2004	Prom Queen: The Marc Hall Story	Otis	Television film
2006	American Pie Presents: The Naked Mile	Erik Stifler	
2007	American Pie Presents: Beta House	Erik Stifler	
2009	Wild Cherry	Franklin Peters	
2011	Boy Toy	Jake	
2013	Hell Hath No Fury	Universal Dude	Short film
2015	88	Marvin	
2015	Farhope Tower	Jake	
2016	Below Her Mouth	Roofer Matt	
2017	Badsville	Martin	
2018	The Maestro	Jerry Goldsmith	
2018	Argos	Mr. Levi	Short film
2019	Somnium	Joseph Harper	Short film
2024	Campton Manor	Jerry	

=== Television ===
Year	Title	Role	Notes
1993	Tales from the Cryptkeeper	Teddy (voice)	Episode: "Nature" Credited as Johnny White
1994	Are You Afraid of the Dark?	Thomas Jefferson Bradshaw	Episode: "The Tale of the Carved Stone"
1994	The Mighty Jungle	Steve	Episode: "Winston on the Town"
1994	The Magic School Bus	Caller (voice)	Episode: "Plays Ball"
1994	Blauvogel	Michael Ruster / Blauvogel / 12 Year Old Bluehawk	Main role; 13 episodes
1995	Kung Fu: The Legend Continues	Ricki Nillson	2 episodes
1995	Ultraforce	Additional voices (voice)	Episode: "Prime Time"
1995–1996	Goosebumps	Steve Boswell/Michael Webster	3 episodes
1997–2000	The Adventures of Shirley Holmes	Francis Boris 'Bo' Sawchuk	Main role; 52 episodes
2000	Real Kids, Real Adventures	Kai	Episode: "Avalanche: The Kyle Hale Story"
2002	Undressed	Luke	Season 6
2003	Tarzan	Justin Rhinehart	Episode: "Rules of Engagement"
2004	1-800-Missing	Camper	Episode: "A Death in the Family"
2004–2005	6teen	Christo (voice)	2 episodes
2009	Cold Case	Tommy Flanagan '80	Episode: "Iced"
2011	The Kennedys	Young Jack Kennedy	Episode: "Joe's Revenge"
2011	Alphas	Sam Girardi	Episode: "Never Let Me Go"
2011	Combat Hospital	PFC Nick Marvers	Episode: "On the Brink"
2012	Good God	Graham Palk	Recurring role; 9 episodes
2013	Lucky 7	Det. Kilner	Episode: "Inside Job"
2017	Baskets	Mover #1	Episode: "Freaks"
2019	Designated Survivor	Hotel Front Desk Agent	Episode: "#scaredsh*tless"
