= Lizze Broadway =

American actress

- Occupation: Actress
- Years active: 2010–present

Lizze Broadway is an American actress. She is best known for her role as Emma Meyer / Little Cricket in the Prime Video series Gen V.

== Career ==
=== Early career (2010–2020) ===
Broadway started her acting career as a teenager, mainly having guest roles in various TV series. She debuted at the age of 12 in the crime drama series Southland, where she played the role of Brooks Ryerson. In 2011, she appeared in the comedy drama series Shameless as the unnamed daughter of another character. The same year she played the role of Rose in the television film Bad Mom. In 2013, Broadway appeared in the crime procedural comedy-drama series Bones as Kat Martin, a role for which she was nominated for a Young Artist Award for best guest actress. That year, she also played Steph in the variety and late-night talk show Conan. In 2014, Broadway played the role of Maya in one episode of the first season of Trophy Wife.

In 2015, Broadway starred in the television film 16 and Missing as Becca Koats, a role she reprised in the 2018 drama series Here and Now. In 2017, Broadway played JoJo McKinnon Chicago P.D.. In 2018, Broadway guest starred as Mandy in one episode of the police procedural series NCIS. In 2018, she appeared as Heather Bogart in the comedy series Henry Danger. Broadway starred in the television film Instakiller as Harper with Kelly Sullivan. Broadway appeared in the comedy series Splitting Up Together as Zoey. She also played the role of Aurora in two episodes of the crime drama series The Rookie.

=== The Boys and breakthrough (2020–present) ===
In 2020, she starred as the main protagonist Stephanie Stifler in the comedy film American Pie Presents: Girls' Rules.

Since 2023, she has played Emma Meyer / Little Cricket in the Amazon Original spin-off of The Boys titled Gen V, part of The Boys franchise. For her role, she was nominated for a Critics' Choice Super Award for best actress. In 2026, she also appeared in the fifth and final season of The Boys.

== Filmography ==
=== Film ===
Year	Title	Role	Notes
2016	A Killer Walks Amongst Us		
2017	Perception	Josi	Short film
2020	American Pie Presents: Girls' Rules	Stephanie Stifler	Direct-to-DVD
2022	The Inhabitant	Suzy Beemer	
2023	Ghosted	Mattie Turner	
2025	Kinda Pregnant	Shirley	

=== Television ===
Year	Title	Role	Notes
2010	Southland	Brooks Ryerson	Episode: "Butch & Sundance"
2011	Shameless	Daughter	Episode: "Daddyz Girl"
2011	Bad Mom	Rose	Television film
2013	Bones	Kat Martin	Episode: "The Friend in Need"
2013	Conan	Steph	Episode: "Ted Nugent & Quentin Tarantino Present: Django Wango Tango"
2014	Trophy Wife	Maya	Episode: "There's No Guy in Team"
2015	16 and Missing	Becca Koats	Television film
2017	Chicago P.D.	JoJo McKinnon	Episode: "Grasping for Salvation"
2018	NCIS	Mandy	Episode: "Family Ties"
2018	Here and Now	Becca Koats	5 episodes
2018	Henry Danger	Heather Bogart	Episode: "Diamonds Are for Heather"
2018	Instakiller	Harper	Television film
2018–2019	Splitting Up Together	Zoey	2 episodes
2019	Slay	Ashley	TV miniseries
2019–2021	The Rookie	Aurora	2 episodes
2020	The Lost Boys	Willa "Billie" Frog	Television film
2023	Based on a True Story	Dahlia Stone	Episode: "The Survivor"
2023–2025	Gen V	Emma Meyer / Little Cricket	Main role
2026	The Boys	Emma Meyer / Little Cricket	Episode: "Blood and Bone"

== Awards and nominations ==
Awards and nominations received by Gen V
Year (Note: The listed year refers to the date of the ceremony.)	Award	Category	Work	Result	Ref.
2014	Young Artist Awards	Best Performance in a TV Series - Guest Starring Young Actress 14–16	Bones	Nominated	
2024	Critics' Choice Super Awards	Best Actress in a Superhero Series	Gen V	Nominated	
