= Jake Siegel =

American actor (born 1983)

- Born: May 22, 1983 (age 42)
- Occupation: Actor
- Years active: 2003–present

Jake Siegel (born May 22, 1983) is an American actor best known for playing the role of Mike "Cooze" Coozemen in both American Pie Presents: The Naked Mile (2007) and American Pie Presents: Beta House (2009). His television credits include guest roles in Commander in Chief, the Trojan Vision series Friends Hate You, and iCarly.

== Filmography ==
=== Film ===
Year	Title	Role	Notes
2003	Stranded	Jim	
2006	The Need	Jake	Short film
2006	American Pie Presents: The Naked Mile	Mike "Cooze" Coozeman	
2007	American Pie Presents: Beta House	Mike "Cooze" Coozeman	
2009	Nice Knowing You	Scotty	Short film
2010	Hello	Ed	Short film
2013	Cavemen	Perry	

=== Television ===
Year	Title	Role	Notes
2006	Commander in Chief	Kid #2	Episode: "Wind Beneath My Wing"
2009	iCarly	Cal	Episode: "iGo Nuclear"
