= Adam Herz =

American screenwriter and producer (born 1972)

- Known for: Screenwriter; producer

Adam Herz (born September 12, 1972) is an American screenwriter and producer known for selling the script of the movie American Pie.

Herz's first screenplay, originally titled East Great Falls High, was written over a winter ski vacation in 1998. It was based on his high school years in East Grand Rapids, Michigan. It sold for a reported $650,000 in 1999 and became the film American Pie.

In July 2019, POP TV ordered an 8-episode run of his newly created high school-set comedy, Bad Intentions. The show was later cancelled right before cameras were due to start rolling due to original content cuts.

Herz is a whiskey enthusiast and has a reputation for identifying counterfeit high-end spirits.

He is Jewish.

== Filmography ==
=== Films ===
Year	Title	Writer	Producer	Notes
1999	American Pie	Yes	No	Also uncredited co-producer
2001	American Pie 2	Yes	Executive	Also cameo: Younger Business Suit
2003	American Wedding	Yes	Yes	
2008	My Best Friend's Girl	No	Yes	
2011	Mardi Gras: Spring Break	No	Yes	
2012	American Reunion	No	Yes	
2016	Flock of Dudes	No	Executive	
2020	American Pie Presents: Girls' Rules	No	Executive	

Also credited "Based on characters created by" for all other American Pie films, in which he did not participate personally.

=== Television ===
Year	Title	Writer	Executive producer	Creator	Notes
2001	Go Fish	Yes	Yes	Yes	Creator and executive producer (5 episodes); Writer (Episode: ""Go Four-Point Plan")
2019	Best Intentions	Yes	Yes	Yes	Unaired pilot for cancelled series
