= Andrew Waller =

American film director

- Occupation: Film director
- Years active: 1996–present

Andrew Waller is an American film director. He has directed the films Taking Five and American Pie Presents: Beta House, both of which were released in 2007. Prior to directing, he worked as a photographer on the short films Liquid (2001), Hairless (2004) and Miracle Mile (2004). In 2005, he directed and wrote the short film Candy Paint. He also worked as a location assistant on the 1996 film Mr. Wrong starring Ellen DeGeneres and Bill Pullman.
