= Ramona Branch =

Overview
- Status: Abandoned
- Owner: Grand Rapids, Lansing and Detroit Railroad
- Locale: Kent County, Michigan
- Termini: Oakdale Station, Grand Rapids; Reeds Lake
- Stations: 2

Service
- Services: 1
- Operator(s): Leased to Detroit, Lansing and Northern Railroad

History
- Opened: August 1888
- Closed: 1924?

Technical
- Line length: 2.53 mi (4.07 km)
- Track length: 2.53 mi (4.07 km)
- Number of tracks: 1
- Track gauge: 1,435 mm (4 ft 8 1/2 in) standard gauge
- Operating speed: 0 mph (0 km/h)

The Ramona Branch was a railroad branch line in Kent County, Michigan. First placed in service in August, 1888, it ran 2.53 miles (4.07 km) starting from its connection at its western end with the Detroit, Lansing and Northern Railroad (Currently CSX) at Oakdale Park Station in southeast Grand Rapids, Michigan near present day Eastern Avenue railroad crossing on the CSX Grand Rapids Terminal Sub. It ran in a north easterly direction to end at the popular resort Reeds Lake in East Grand Rapids, Michigan. It is a separate line from the Grand Rapids & Reeds Lake Railway line that connected to Ramona Park in the same area.

== Remnants ==
The line was abandoned. Remnants remain in a railroad spur along Ramona Street in south east Grand Rapids, Michigan, as well as in several paths and walkways. The former course of the line can be seen on city maps, as several streets are interrupted by the former course of the railbed.
