= Coldbrook Creek (Michigan) =

Coordinates: 42°57′25″N 85°37′23″W

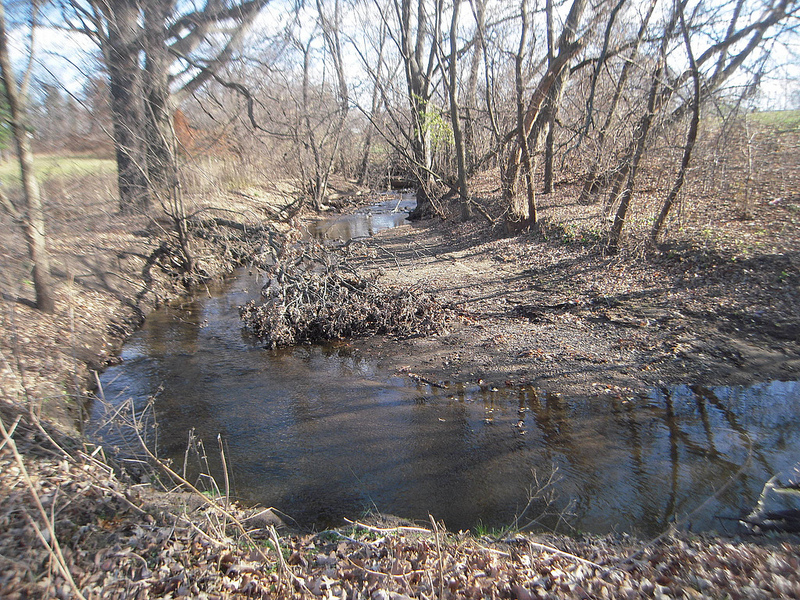
- Coldbrook Creek in Highland Park

Location
- Country: United States

Physical characteristics
- Source
  - location: Fisk Lake
  - elevation: 732 ft (223 m)
- Mouth
  - location: Grand River

Basin features
- River system: Grand River (Michigan)

Coldbrook Creek is an urban stream in Grand Rapids in Kent County, Michigan. Its origin is the outflow of Fisk Lake on the John W. Blodgett Estate, and the stream eventually drains to the Grand River. Although parts of the stream are now in underground culverts, there are significant possibilities for daylighting, and open streambeds appear in areas on the campus of Aquinas College as well as within Highland Park. Part of its course through Grand Rapids is parallel to the Grand Rapids Eastern Railroad.

== History ==
Ke-way-coosh-cum, known in English as Long Nose, and a signer of the Treaty of Washington (1836), was killed by Was-o-ge-nan at the place where the creek enters the Grand River. This may have been in revenge for his participation in the treaty. The creek has also been referred to as Blood Creek, because of this occurrence. , There was a grist mill run by the Lyman brothers on the creek, near the present day Plainfield and Leonard.

Coldbrook Creek, and its tributary Carrier Creek, were the source of the water for the first pumped water supply in Grand Rapids, Michigan. The pumphouse was located near the mouth of the creek at Coldbrook and Monroe.

== Flora and fauna ==
- Cole, Emma J. (1901). Grand Rapids flora: a catalogue of the flowering plants and ferns growing without cultivation in the vicinity of Grand Rapids, Michigan (digitized book). A. Van Dort. p. 1. "Coldbrook Creek Grand Rapids."

== Natural Status and Restoration ==
Coldbrook creek starts at Fisk Lake in the backyard of the Blodgett mansion. Except for a portion that runs through the campus of Aquinas College and within Highland Park, most of the stream has been made to run in culverts as the Coldbrook Drain.
