= John W. Blodgett Estate =

Historic house in Michigan, United States

- U.S. National Register of Historic Places
- Michigan State Historic Site
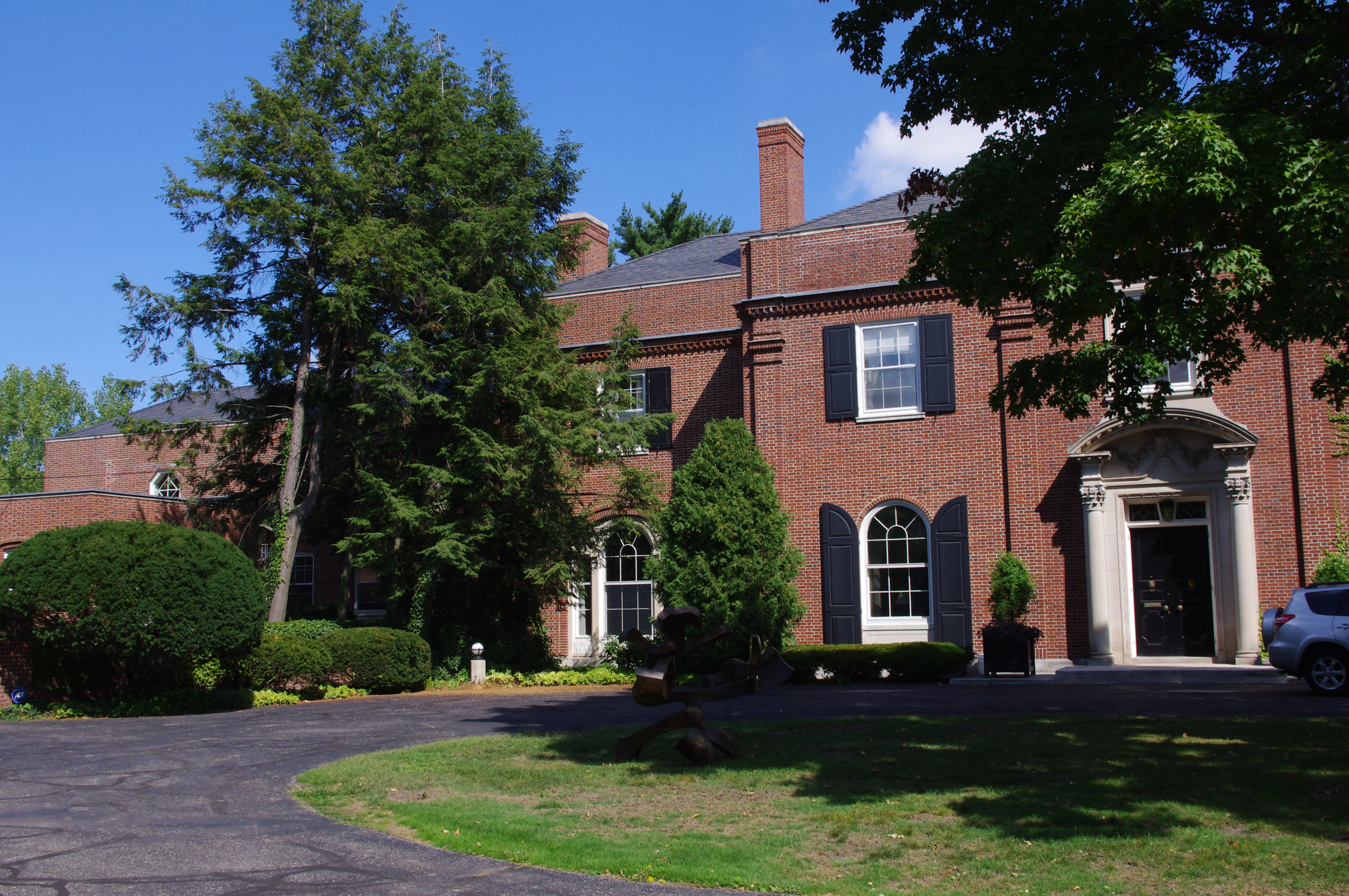

- Location within Michigan
- Interactive map
- Location: East Grand Rapids, Michigan
- Coordinates: 42°57′26″N 85°37′25″W
- Area: 8 acres (3.2 ha)
- Built: 1928
- Architect: Walker and Gillette
- Architectural style: Colonial Revival
- NRHP reference No.: 83000877
- MSHS No.: P23712

Significant dates
- Added to NRHP: July 28, 1983
- Designated MSHS: December 8, 1977

The John W. Blodgett Estate, also known as Brookby, is an historic landmark at 250 Plymouth Rd, SE, East Grand Rapids, Michigan. It was listed on the National Register of Historic Places in 1983 and designated a Michigan State Historic Site in 1977. The property was owned by Aquinas College until 2026.

== History ==
Delos A. Blodgett moved to Michigan in 1848 and became rich in the lumbering business. He came to Grand Rapids in 1881. By that time, his son, John W. Blodgett (born in 1860) had taken over part of the business. John W. Blodgett served as president of the Muskegon Boom Company from 1883 to 1893, and following his father's retirement in 1900, he took over as chairman of the Blodgett Company.

In 1895, John W. Blodgett married Minnie Cumnock of Lowell, Massachusetts. Minnie Cumnock Blodgett took a deep interest in community affairs, and was nationally known for her work in public health and welfare. In 1928, the Blodgetts constructed a new estate located on Fisk Lake. The estate consists of the Blodgett house as well as several other subsidiary buildings. The main house was designed by the A. Stewart Walker, a member of the architectural firm of Walker and Gillette. The surrounding grounds were designed by the Olmsted Brothers. John and Minnie Blodgett lived at the estate until their deaths, hers in 1931 and his in 1951. John W. Blodgett willed the estate to Blodgett Hospital, but hist son, John Jr., repurchased it the next year, and lived there until his death in 1986.

The Blodgett estate stayed in the Blodgett family after John and Minnie's death, until Edith Blodgett sold it in the early 1990s. Sam and Janene Cummings purchased the estate in 1997, and in 2011 donated it to Aquinas College. Aquinas began restoration of the estate in 2016, and owned the property until February 2026, when the property was purchased by a developer Whitmore Custom Homes. Whitmore hopes to preserve the estate while purposing four additional lots from the original property.

== Description ==
The John W. Blodgett Estate is an eight-acre parcel containing the Blodgett house and other, subsidiary buildings. The grounds are beautifully landscaped, and include formal gardens, terraces, and large, old trees. The house is a broad-fronted two-story red brick structure with Georgian Revival detailing. The main facade contains a central portion which projects forward from the main mass of the building. This section is divided into three bays by four pilasters. A dentiled brick cornice runs across the pilaster tops. The central bay contains the entrance, consisting of the two slender doors topped by a transom and flanked by Corinthian pilasters. A row of Corinthian columns supporting a pediment fronts the entrance. The first-floor windows throughout the house are set in semi-circular arched openings, and have semi-circular fanlight windows and side lights. The second-floor openings are rectangular, and most contain double-hung, six-over-six windows.
