= Martha Teichner =

American television news correspondent (born 1948)

- Born: Martha Teichner; January 12, 1948 (age 78); Traverse City, Michigan, U.S.
- Education: Wellesley College, University of Chicago
- Occupation: News correspondent

Martha Teichner (pronounced [ˈtaɪʃnɚ] TAISH-ner, born January 12, 1948) is an American television news correspondent. She has reported for CBS News since 1977, and is best known for the segments she contributes to the CBS Sunday Morning program.

== Early life and education ==
Martha Teichner was born to Jewish parents in Traverse City, Michigan, on January 12, 1948. Her father, Hans "Peppi" Teichner, was a German-born ski instructor, who fled to Spain after Adolf Hitler took power in 1933, and then emigrated to the United States after Franco's fascists crushed their opponents in the Spanish Civil War. He is credited with popularizing skiing in Northern Michigan, and was inducted into the U.S. Ski and Snowboard Hall of Fame in 1967. Martha was raised in nearby Cleveland Township, in Leelanau County, near the Sugar Loaf Ski Resort, which her father managed.

After Hans Teichner's death at age 49 in 1957, Martha and her mother, Miriam Greene Teichner, relocated briefly to Augusta, Georgia, before settling in East Grand Rapids, Michigan. Martha graduated from East Grand Rapids High School in 1965.

Teichner earned a bachelor's degree in economics from Wellesley College in 1969, and then attended the Graduate School of Business Administration at the University of Chicago.

== Career ==
Teichner filed her first report for CBS News on November 8, 1977, with Walter Cronkite at the anchor desk. She has been a correspondent for CBS Sunday Morning since December 1993.

Teichner has won 15 Emmy Awards and five James Beard Foundation Awards for her work. In 2020, she was inducted into the Michigan Women's Hall of Fame.

== Personal life ==
Teichner is single, never married, and resides in New York City.

In February 2021, Teichner published a memoir titled When Harry Met Minnie, which relates the story of her friendship with a cancer patient and fellow dog owner.
