= Steve Belkin =

American businessman (born 1947)

- Born: Steven Bruce Belkin; 1947 (age 78–79); East Grand Rapids, Michigan
- Education: Cornell University (BA); Harvard Business School (MBA)
- Occupations: entrepreneur, businessman
- Known for: co-owner of the Atlanta Thrashers and Atlanta Hawks
- Spouse: Joan Belkin
- Children: 2

Steve Belkin is an American businessman who founded Trans National Group, which provides travel and other services, especially to affinity groups. He is also a former owner of the Atlanta Thrashers and Atlanta Hawks.

== Biography ==
Belkin was born in East Grand Rapids, Michigan where he attended East Grand Rapids High School. He is of Jewish descent. He graduated from Cornell University in 1969 with a BS degree in industrial engineering, and later served on the Board of Trustees and was named Cornell Entrepreneur of the Year in 2004. He also finished Harvard Business School and earned an MBA in 1971. In 1973 launched his first business, marketing discount vacation packages to members of the American Nurses Association and essentially inventing what is now called affinity travel and affinity credit cards. Since then, he has founded 29 other companies, including Trans National Group in 1974. The companies currently affiliated with Trans National Group include Trans National Communications, TNT Vacations, TN Real Estate, TN Marketing, Charlesgate West Management and Belkin Family Lookout Farm in Natick, Massachusetts.

In 2004, he became the largest individual shareholder and principal owner of Atlanta Spirit, LLC; the group that owned the Atlanta Thrashers and Atlanta Hawks.

Belkin currently serves as a National Commissioner and Honorary Life Member of the ADL, on the Board of Overseers of the Museum of Fine Arts Boston, and a Trustee of the Sports Museum of New England. He lives with his wife Joan and two children in Weston, an affluent Boston suburb.

== Recognition ==
Throughout his career, Belkin has received several awards and recognition for his philanthropic endeavors.

- Temple Beth Elohim: Tikkun Olam Award, 2015
- Robert F. Kennedy Children’s Action Corps: Embracing the Legacy Award, 2010
- Human Relations Services: Community Service Award, 2009
- ADL: Distinguished Community Service Award, 2003.
- Reach Out and Read National Center: Literacy Champion Award, 2002
- New England Assoc. of Healthcare Philanthropy: Distinguished Service Award, 2001
- Cornell University College of Human Ecology: Alumni Award for Outstanding Volunteerism, 1998
