= Reeds Lake =

Lake in East Grand Rapids, Michigan, USA

- Location within Michigan Location within the United States
- Location: East Grand Rapids, Michigan
- Coordinates: 42.95°N 85.60°W
- Type: freshwater lake
- Primary outflows: Dredged channel to Fisk Lake
- Basin countries: United States
- Surface area: 265 acres (1.1 km^{2})
- Max. depth: 52 ft (16 m)
- Surface elevation: 732 ft (223 m)
- Settlements: East Grand Rapids, Michigan

Reeds Lake is a freshwater lake in the city of East Grand Rapids, Michigan. Formerly the site of an early-20th-century amusement park and resort popular with residents of nearby Grand Rapids, it is adjacent to the suburb's modern-day city center, and serves as a symbol for the community. It is surrounded by private residences along most of its north, east, and south shores, and by public parks municipal facilities, and a few businesses on its west and northwest shores.

The Reeds Lake Triathlon takes place in early September, and the Reeds Lake Run is typically in late June. A paved/boardwalk footpath around the lake is 4.2 miles (6.8 km) long.

== Physical characteristics ==
The lake covers 265 acres (107 ha), with a maximum depth of 52 feet (16 m). It lies at an elevation of 732 feet (223 m) above sea level. It is bounded by marl and peat. The lake is fed by drainage from the surrounding area. Its outflow is to Fisk Lake; they were originally connected by a natural stream, which was deepened and widened by a steam dredge.

The lake is a habitat for the great blue heron, as well as for several Anatidae species, such as the Canada goose, trumpeter swan, and mallard, and other waterfowl such as American coots and gulls. Bald eagles sometimes hunt at the lake.

The Michigan Department of Natural Resources stocks the lake with various fish species, including northern pike and largemouth bass. The lake is used for fishing all year, from the piers, shore, and boats during the warm season, and ice fishing in the winter.

== Facilities ==
John Collins Park, named after the city's mayor from 1933 to 1956, lies along the west shore of the lake. The park has a public boat launch which is open during daylight hours, and a private boathouse and dock for the East Grand Rapids High School rowing team. It includes wheelchair-accessible pedestrian paths, restrooms, and fishing/observation decks into the lake.

Waterfront Park, developed in the early 21st century, lies on the northwest shore of the lake. Minimally developed, it includes 11 acres of undeveloped woodland and wetland, fishing and observation piers that extend into the lake, and a mix of paved and unpaved foot paths.

Along the southwest shore of the lake are several municipal facilities, including East Grand Rapids Middle School, East Grand Rapids City Hall, the East Grand Rapids Department of Public Safety (police and fire), East Grand Rapids Public Library, and the East Grand Rapids Community Center. There is a public canoe/kayak launch behind City Hall.

Private businesses along the west end of the lake include Grand Rapids Yacht Club, Rose's restaurant, and two small private marinas.

== History ==
By the 1870s Reeds Lake had become a popular day trip stop for residents of Grand Rapids and other surrounding communities.

Ramona Park, an amusement park owned and operated by the Grand Rapids Street Railway Company, which provided regular service between the then-nearby city of Grand Rapids and Reeds Lake, was a popular destination spot for area families between 1897 and 1955. A passenger steamer by the name of Ramona was used to ferry passengers around the lake to various destinations.

The Point Paulo resort was located on Reeds Lake in the early 1900s. Several stars of Vaudeville called Reeds Lake and the Ramona Theatre (which was part of Ramona Park) their favorite stop on the theatre circuit.

== See also ==
- List of lakes in Michigan
