= Luke Glendening =

American ice hockey player (born 1989)

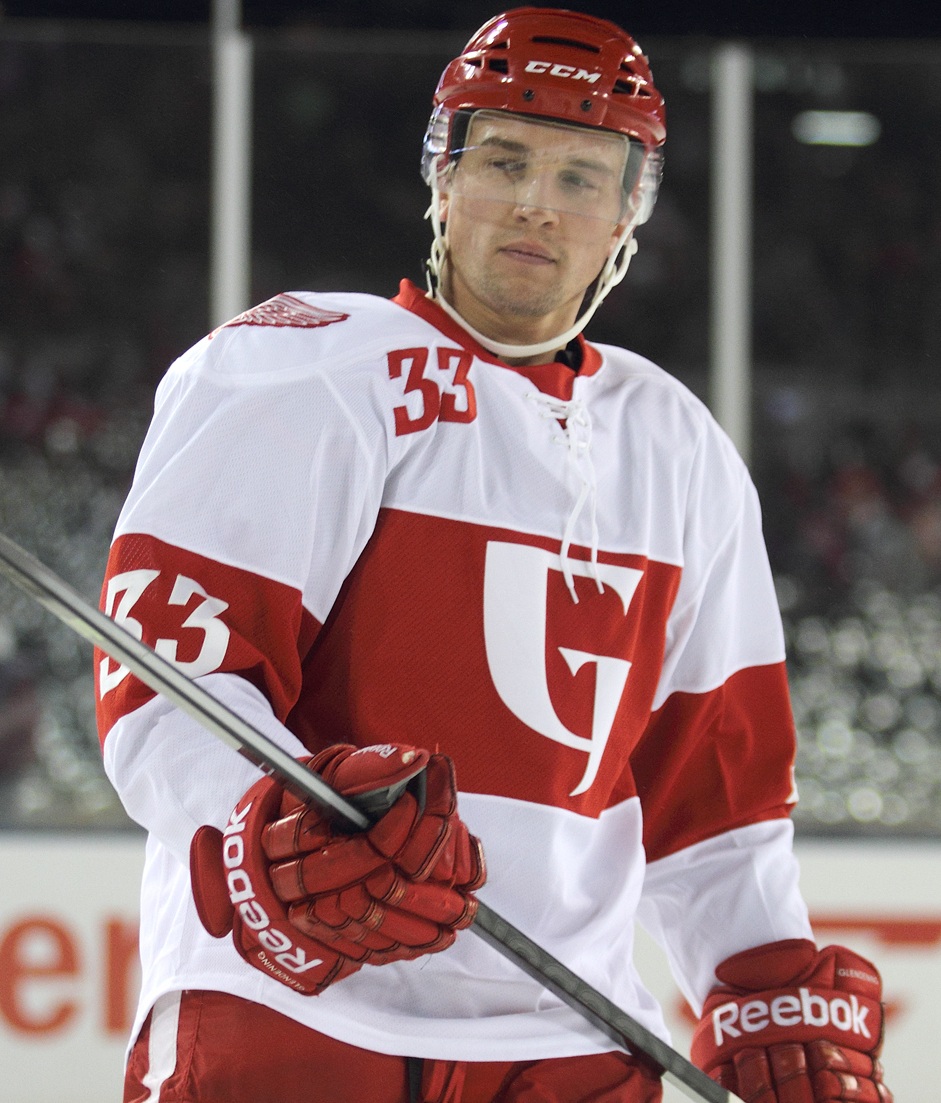
- Glendening with the Grand Rapids Griffins in 2013
- Born: April 28, 1989 (age 37) East Grand Rapids, Michigan, U.S.
- Height: 5 ft 11 in (180 cm)
- Weight: 190 lb (86 kg; 13 st 8 lb)
- Position: Forward
- Shoots: Right
- NHL team Former teams: Chicago Blackhawks; Detroit Red Wings; Dallas Stars; Tampa Bay Lightning; New Jersey Devils; Philadelphia Flyers; New York Rangers
- National team: United States
- NHL draft: Undrafted
- Playing career: 2012–present

Luke Glendening (born April 28, 1989) is an American professional ice hockey player who is a forward for the Chicago Blackhawks of the National Hockey League (NHL). He previously played in the NHL for the Detroit Red Wings, Dallas Stars, Tampa Bay Lightning, New Jersey Devils, Philadelphia Flyers, and New York Rangers.

== Playing career ==
=== Amateur ===
Glendening started out his years of playing hockey in his hometown East Grand Rapids, Michigan. He played varsity all four years he attended East Grand Rapids High School and was their leading scorer for two out of the four years. He also spent one year as a post-graduate at The Hotchkiss School. Prior to turning professional, Glendening attended the University of Michigan where he played four seasons (2008–2012) of NCAA college hockey with the Michigan Wolverines.

In his sophomore season, Glendening was an alternate captain for Michigan. In 45 games, Glendening recorded seven goals and 14 assists. The Wolverines slipped to seventh in the CCHA but won six straight games in the conference tournament to win the 2010 CCHA men's ice hockey tournament and earn an NCAA tournament bid. Michigan defeated Bemidji State in the NCAA Midwest Regional before falling to Miami, 3–2, in double overtime in the regional final.

Glendening was a captain for Michigan in his junior season, along with Carl Hagelin. He was one of six Wolverines to play in all 44 games, where he recorded eight goals and 10 assists. Michigan finished first in the CCHA and received an at-large bid to the NCAA tournament after a surprise loss to Western Michigan in the CCHA semifinals. The Wolverines swept Nebraska-Omaha and Colorado College to capture the NCAA West Regional and defeated North Dakota, 2–0, to reach the Frozen Four championship game; falling 3–2 to Minnesota-Duluth in overtime.

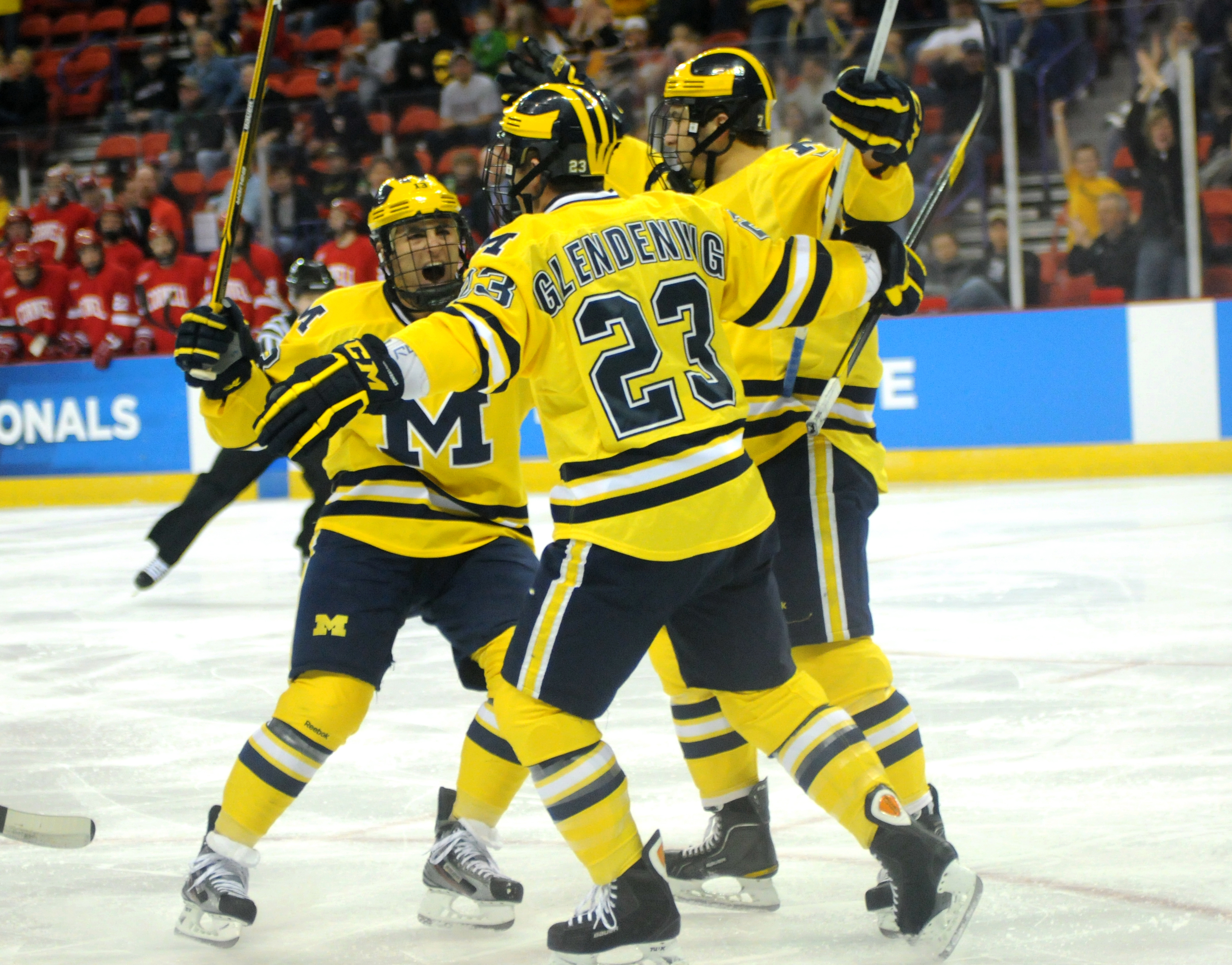
Glendening (centre foreground) with the Wolverines during his senior year at the University of Michigan, March 2012

Glendening was again a captain for Michigan in his senior season and scored a career-high 10 goals and 11 assists in 41 games. The Wolverines finished tied for second place in the CCHA with Western Michigan and received an at-large bid to the NCAA tournament after falling to the Broncos in the CCHA Championship Game. Cornell defeated Michigan, 3–2 in overtime, in the regional semifinals.

=== Professional ===
On June 19, 2012, the Grand Rapids Griffins of the American Hockey League (AHL) signed Glendening as a free agent to a one-year contract. During the 2012–13 AHL season, Glendening played 51 regular-season games in the AHL with the Griffins, and also played 27 games in the ECHL with the Toledo Walleye, where he was selected to play in the 2013 ECHL All-Star Game, but could not attend because he was recalled to the AHL. Glendening played 24 post-season games with Grand Rapids, scoring 16 points to help lead the Griffins to their first Calder Cup championship.

On July 5, 2013, the Detroit Red Wings signed Glendening to a one-year, two-way contract. On October 12, 2013, Glendening made his NHL debut in a game against the Philadelphia Flyers. On April 5, 2014, the Detroit Red Wings signed Glendening to a three-year contract extension. Glendening scored his first career NHL goal later that night against Carey Price of the Montreal Canadiens. Glendening set a franchise record among rookie forwards for the most games played without a goal, at 52 games, surpassing Cummy Burton, who played his entire 43-game Detroit career without scoring a goal.

On July 14, 2016, the Red Wings signed Glendening to a four-year contract extension. On March 10, 2020, Glendening played in his 500th career NHL game for the Red Wings, becoming the first undrafted player to do so for Detroit since the NHL went to a seven-round draft in 2005.

Following his eighth season with the Red Wings, having concluded his contract Glendening left the organization as a free agent and was signed by the Dallas Stars to a two-year, $3 million contract on July 28, 2021.

Following his two-season tenure with the Stars, Glendening signed as a free agent with his third NHL club, the Tampa Bay Lightning, on a two-year, $1.6 million contract on July 1, 2023.

Going unsigned in free agency prior to the 2025–26 NHL season, Glendening signed a professional tryout agreement with the New Jersey Devils on September 5, 2025; one month later, on October 7, Glendening signed a one-year contract with the team. Several months later, on March 5, 2026, the Devils waived Glendening; he was subsequently claimed by the Philadelphia Flyers the following day.

At the conclusion of his contract with the Flyers, Glendening remained un-signed as a free agent over the summer until he agreed to a professional tryout with former club, the Tampa Bay Lightning, on September 16, 2026. On September 25, Tampa Bay released him from training camp prior to the 2026–27 season. Glendening was then signed to a professional tryout with the New York Rangers on October 19, and later signed a one-year contract on October 22.

== International play ==
On April 19, 2019, Glendening was selected to make his international debut in representing the United States national team at the 2019 World Championship.

== Career statistics ==
=== Regular season and playoffs ===
			Regular season					Playoffs
Season	Team	League	GP	G	A	Pts	PIM	GP	G	A	Pts	PIM
2008–09	University of Michigan	CCHA	35	6	4	10	33	—	—	—	—	—
2009–10	University of Michigan	CCHA	45	7	14	21	39	—	—	—	—	—
2010–11	University of Michigan	CCHA	44	8	10	18	26	—	—	—	—	—
2011–12	University of Michigan	CCHA	41	10	11	21	24	—	—	—	—	—
2011–12	Providence Bruins	AHL	3	0	0	0	0	—	—	—	—	—
2012–13	Toledo Walleye	ECHL	27	14	7	21	27	—	—	—	—	—
2012–13	Grand Rapids Griffins	AHL	51	8	18	26	50	24	6	10	16	30
2013–14	Grand Rapids Griffins	AHL	18	5	7	12	18	—	—	—	—	—
2013–14	Detroit Red Wings	NHL	56	1	6	7	22	5	1	0	1	0
2014–15	Detroit Red Wings	NHL	82	12	6	18	34	7	2	1	3	8
2015–16	Detroit Red Wings	NHL	81	8	13	21	46	5	0	1	1	0
2016–17	Detroit Red Wings	NHL	74	3	11	14	26	—	—	—	—	—
2017–18	Detroit Red Wings	NHL	69	11	8	19	17	—	—	—	—	—
2018–19	Detroit Red Wings	NHL	78	10	13	23	15	—	—	—	—	—
2019–20	Detroit Red Wings	NHL	60	6	3	9	14	—	—	—	—	—
2020–21	Detroit Red Wings	NHL	54	6	9	15	20	—	—	—	—	—
2021–22	Dallas Stars	NHL	82	9	7	16	15	6	0	0	0	2
2022–23	Dallas Stars	NHL	70	3	3	6	50	17	2	1	3	2
2023–24	Tampa Bay Lightning	NHL	81	10	1	11	39	5	0	0	0	0
2024–25	Tampa Bay Lightning	NHL	77	4	3	7	10	5	1	1	2	0
2025–26	New Jersey Devils	NHL	52	0	4	4	4	—	—	—	—	—
2025–26	Philadelphia Flyers	NHL	18	2	3	5	4	10	1	0	1	6
NHL totals			934	85	90	175	316	60	7	4	11	18

=== International ===
Year	Team	Event	Result	GP	G	A	Pts	PIM
2019	United States	WC	7th	8	0	2	2	0
Senior totals				8	0	2	2	0

Awards and achievements
Preceded by Carl Hagelin	CCHA Best Defensive Forward; 2011–12	Succeeded by Dane Walters
