= Grand Rapids & Reeds Lake Railway =

Overview
- Dates of operation: 1875–1883
- Predecessor: none
- Successor: Street Railway Company of Grand Rapids

The Grand Rapids and Reeds Lake Railway Company was organized in 1872 as a horsecar tramway company. Initially, the streetcar was to run down Sherman Street south of Wealthy Street in Grand Rapids, Michigan. Property owners along Wealthy Street raised $17,000 in subscriptions as an inducement and donated it to the Grand Rapids and Reeds Lake Railway. This contribution paid the cost of construction of the streetcar tracks along Wealthy Street, with the railway company agreeing to operate and maintain the line. This line began downtown, running from Fulton Street to LaGrave Avenue then along Wealthy Street to Reeds Lake and Ramona Park, providing general access the entire length of the route for a ten cent fare.

On March 23, 1875, the city of Grand Rapids authorized the use of some of its streets for the tramway and service began that year. In 1877, the company replaced horses with a ten-ton steam locomotive capable of pulling three cars. In 1883, the company merged with the city's three other streetcar companies to form the Street Railway Company of Grand Rapids.
