= Fisk Lake =

Lake in the state of Michigan, United States

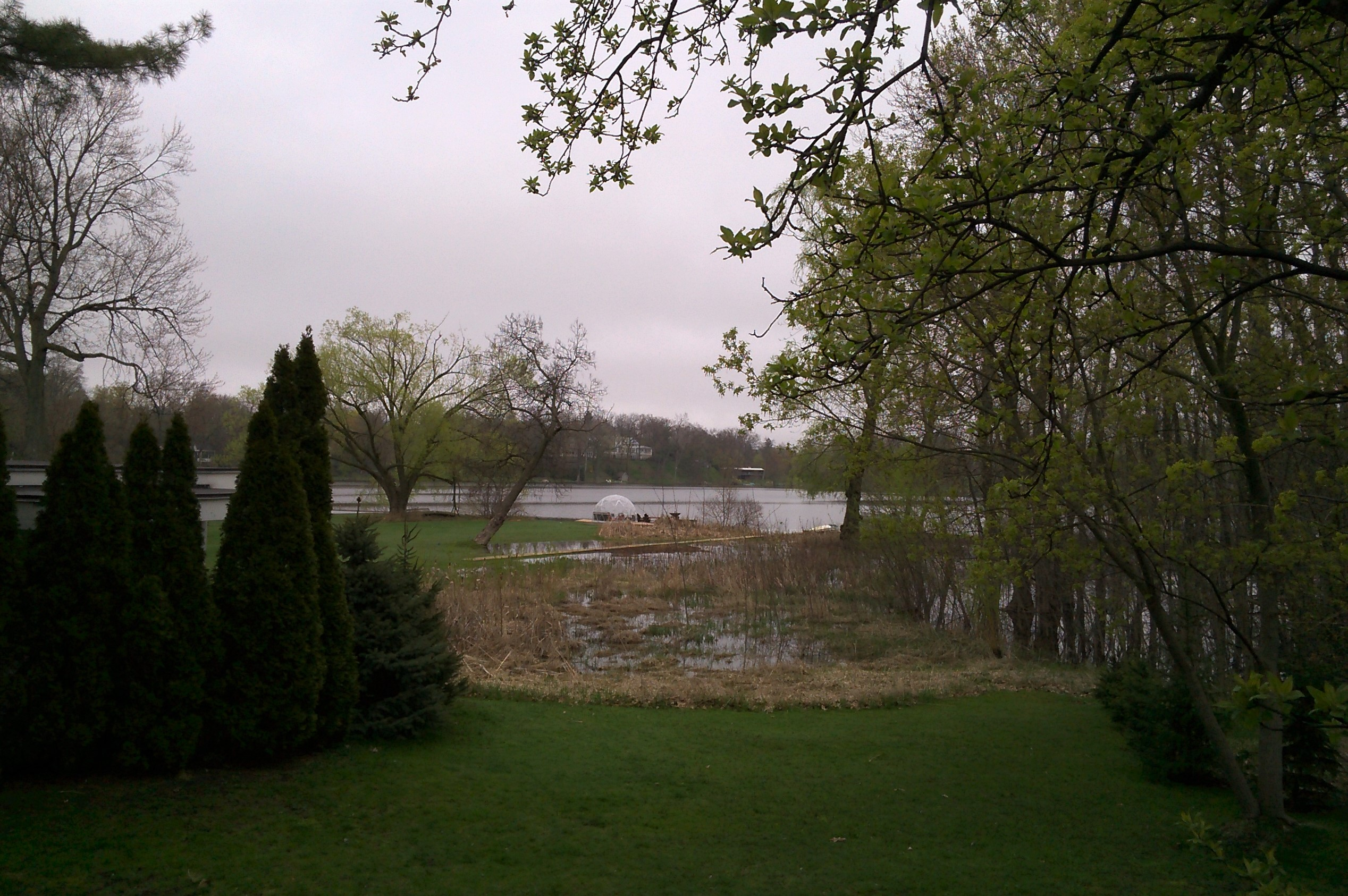

- Location within Michigan
- Location: East Grand Rapids, Michigan, United States
- Coordinates: 42°57′22″N 85°37′13″W
- Type: natural
- Primary inflows: Dredged channel from Reeds Lake
- Primary outflows: Coldbrook Creek
- Basin countries: United States
- Surface area: 26 acres (0.1 km^{2})
- Surface elevation: 732 feet (223 m)

Fisk Lake is a freshwater lake in East Grand Rapids, Michigan, United States. It was named for John Fisk. Now primarily valued for scenic purposes, it was originally used as a source of ice for Grand Rapids, Michigan and the Chicago meatpacking industries. It receives water from Reeds Lake, and drains to the Grand River by way of Coldbrook Creek.

== See also ==
- List of lakes in Michigan
