= East Grand Rapids High School =

High school in East Grand Rapids, Michigan, United States

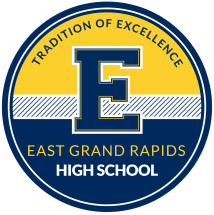

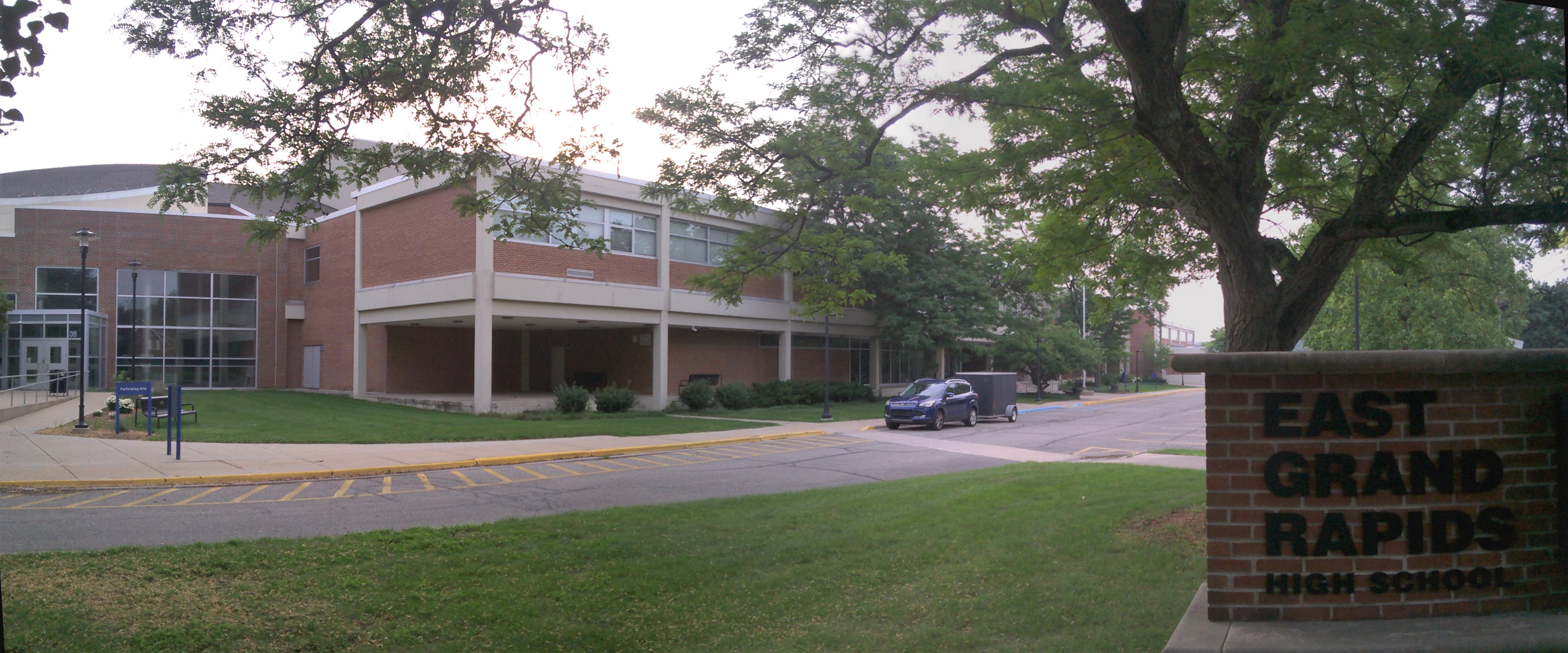

Location
- 2211 Lake Drive Southeast; East Grand Rapids, Michigan 49506; United States; 42°56′58″N 85°36′50″W

Information
- Type: Public secondary school
- Established: 1917
- Principal: Dr. Alex Schukow
- Teaching staff: 47.20 (on an FTE basis)
- Grades: 9-12
- Enrollment: 874 (2023-2024)
- Student to teacher ratio: 18.52
- Campus: Suburban
- Colors: Blue and gold
- Athletics conference: Ottawa-Kent Conference
- Mascot: Pioneer Paul
- Nickname: Pioneers
- Website: egrhs.egrps.org

Student assessments
- 2021–22 school year Change vs. prior year

M-STEP 11th grade proficiency rates (Science / Social Studies)
- Advanced %: 43.2 / 30.5
- Proficient %: 27.2 / 38.3
- PR. Proficient %: 15.6 / 25.9
- Not Proficient %: 14.0 / 5.3

Average test scores
- SAT Total: 1149.8 (▲ +8.8)

East Grand Rapids High School is a public secondary school located in East Grand Rapids, Michigan, United States. It serves grades 9–12 for the East Grand Rapids Public Schools.

== Athletics ==
The EGRHS Pioneers compete in the Ottawa-Kent Conference. School colors are blue and gold. The following Michigan High School Athletic Association (MHSAA) sanctioned sports are offered:

- Baseball (boys)
  - State champion – 2009
- Basketball (girls and boys)
  - Boys state champion – 1950
- Bowling (girls and boys)
- Cross country (girls and boys)
  - Girls state champion – 2003, 2004, 2008, 2009, 2011, 2018, 2019
- Debate
  - State Champion – 1997
- Football (boys)
  - State champion – 1976, 1983, 1993, 1995, 2002, 2003, 2006, 2007, 2008, 2009, 2010
- Golf (girls and boys)
  - Boys state champion – 1939 (tie), 1950, 1951, 2005
  - Girls state champion - 1979, 1999
- Ice hockey (boys)
- Lacrosse (girls and boys)
  - Boys state champion – 2007, 2008, 2009, 2017, 2018, 2021
  - Girls state champion – 2012, 2013, 2014, 2015, 2016, 2019, 2021
- Skiing (girls and boys)
  - Boys state champion – 1997, 1999, 2025
- Soccer (girls and boys)
  - Girls state champion – 2000, 2001, 2002
- Softball (girls)
- Swim and dive (girls and boys)
  - Boys state champion – 1948, 1949, 1950, 1951, 1952, 1953, 1954, 1955, 1956, 1957, 1958, 1959, 1960, 1961, 1962, 1976, 1977, 1978, 1979, 1980, 1981, 1982, 2008, 2010, 2013, 2021, 2022
  - Girls state champion – 1978, 1979, 1981, 1982, 1983, 1984, 1985, 1986, 1988, 1992 (tie), 1993, 1998, 1999, 2000, 2001, 2009, 2010, 2013, 2014, 2016, 2018, 2019
- Tennis (girls and boys)
  - Boys state champion – 1936, 1955, 1956, 1960, 1965, 1970, 1971 (4-way tie), 1972 (tie), 1973, 1975, 1977–1979, 2001, 2003, 2007
- Track and field (girls and boys)
  - Boys state champion – 1940, 1944, 1946, 1948, 1950, 1958
- Volleyball (girls)
  - State champion – 2013
- Wrestling (boys)

The Pioneers' boys' and girls' water polo teams compete in the Michigan Water Polo Association (MWPA), while the coed crew team is a member of the Scholastic Rowing Association of Michigan. The sailing team is a member of the Midwest Interscholastic Sailing Association (MISSA). The girls' field hockey team is a member of the Michigan High School Field Hockey Association, and girls also participate in a competitive Dance Team a member of the "Universal Dance Association" (UDA). The boys' lacrosse team won six Michigan High School Lacrosse Coaches Association (MHSLCA) titles before the sport was sponsored by the MHSAA. The school has a notable rivalry with Lowell High School.

== Performing Arts Center ==
The Performing Arts Center (PAC) is a 671-seat performance hall used for drama productions and musical performances. It features a full orchestra pit, dressing and makeup rooms, and a green room. Built in October 2002, the facility cost $21 million.

On April 20, 2007, President George W. Bush visited East Grand Rapids High School's Performing Arts Center to speak about the war on terror, an event sponsored by the World Affairs Council. On December 5, 2007, former Michigan gubernatorial candidate Dick DeVos gave a speech to students regarding leadership.

== Notable alumni ==
- Jim Boylen, former head coach of the Utah Utes men's basketball team, former head coach of the Chicago Bulls.
- Bridget A. Brink (class of 1987), diplomat
- Doris Cole (born 1938, class of 1955), architect and author
- Allie Dragoo (born 1989), USA Cycling Cervelo Bigla Pro Cycling professional cyclist
- Luke Glendening, NHL hockey player
- Adam Herz, screenwriter
- John Hockenberry, journalist
- Luke Jensen, former professional tennis player
- Laura Kasischke, poet and novelist
- John McNamara, writer
- L. William Seidman, economic advisor to Presidents Gerald Ford and Ronald Reagan, chairman of the FDIC and co-founder of Grand Valley State University.
- Chris Van Allsburg, author and illustrator of children's books
- Peter Meijer, Republican who represented Michigan's 3rd congressional district from 2021 to 2023
- Elizabeth M. Welch, Associate Justice on the Michigan Supreme Court
- Austin Beutner, Businessman, former publisher and CEO of Los Angeles Times, superintendent of Los Angeles Public School District
- Henry F. Schaefer III, one of the most highly cited chemists in the world
- Gillian Sorensen, former United Nations Assistant Secretary-General for External Relations
- Martha Teichner, television news correspondent
- John Ronan, Architect, designer and educator
- David McLaughlin, 14th President of Dartmouth College
- Ryan McInerney, President of Visa Inc.
- Natalie Fratto, Vice President at Goldman Sachs
- Dave Engbers, co-founder of Founders Brewing Company
- Jeanne Brooks-Gunn, Co-Director of the National Center for Children and Families at Teachers College, Columbia University
- Steve Belkin, founder of Trans National Group
- Steve Pestka, former member of the Michigan House of Representatives

== In popular culture ==
The working title for the film American Pie was "East Grand Rapids". Much of American Pie is based on writer Adam Herz's days at East Grand Rapids High School. In the film, the town is called "East Great Falls", and the high school bears the same school colors — blue and gold — along with a similar mascot — the Trailblazers instead of the Pioneers.
