= Emma Cole =

American botanist, botanical collector, and teacher (1845–1910)

Emma Jane Cole
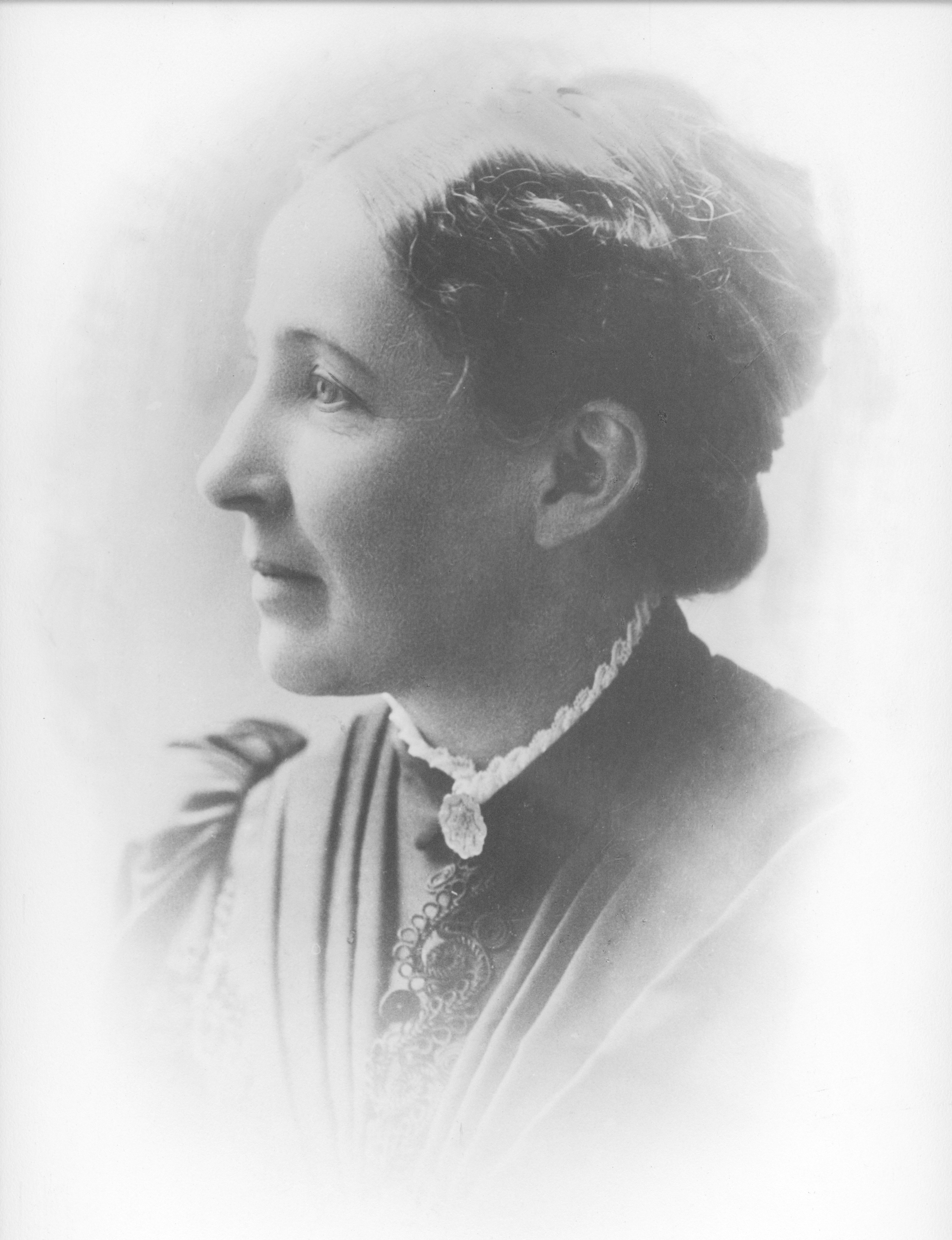
- Portrait of Cole, c. 1881
- Born: January 23, 1845; Ohio, U.S.
- Died: April 25, 1910 (aged 65); San Antonio, Texas, U.S.
- Occupations: Botanist, teacher, curator
- Notable work: Grand Rapids Flora: A Catalogue of the Flowering Plants and Ferns Growing Without Cultivation in the Vicinity of Grand Rapids, Michigan

Emma Jane Cole (January 23, 1845 – April 25, 1910) was an American teacher, botanist, and curator, and the author of Grand Rapids Flora: A Catalogue of the Flowering Plants and Ferns Growing Without Cultivation in the Vicinity of Grand Rapids, Michigan. She was inducted into the Michigan Women's Hall of Fame in 2007.

== Early life ==
Emma Jane Cole was born in Ohio on January 23, 1845. During her childhood, her family moved to Vergennes Township, near Grand Rapids, Michigan, where she attended Lowell Union School and Grand Rapids High School.

Her parents were Andrew Cole and Jerusha Cole. She had three siblings, brothers John and Hugh, and sister Mary Cole Altman.

In 1876, Cole enrolled at Cornell University in New York, which had recently begun admitting women. She attended Cornell in 1876–1877 and 1879–1880 and completed coursework in botany, but is not recorded as having received a degree.

== Career ==
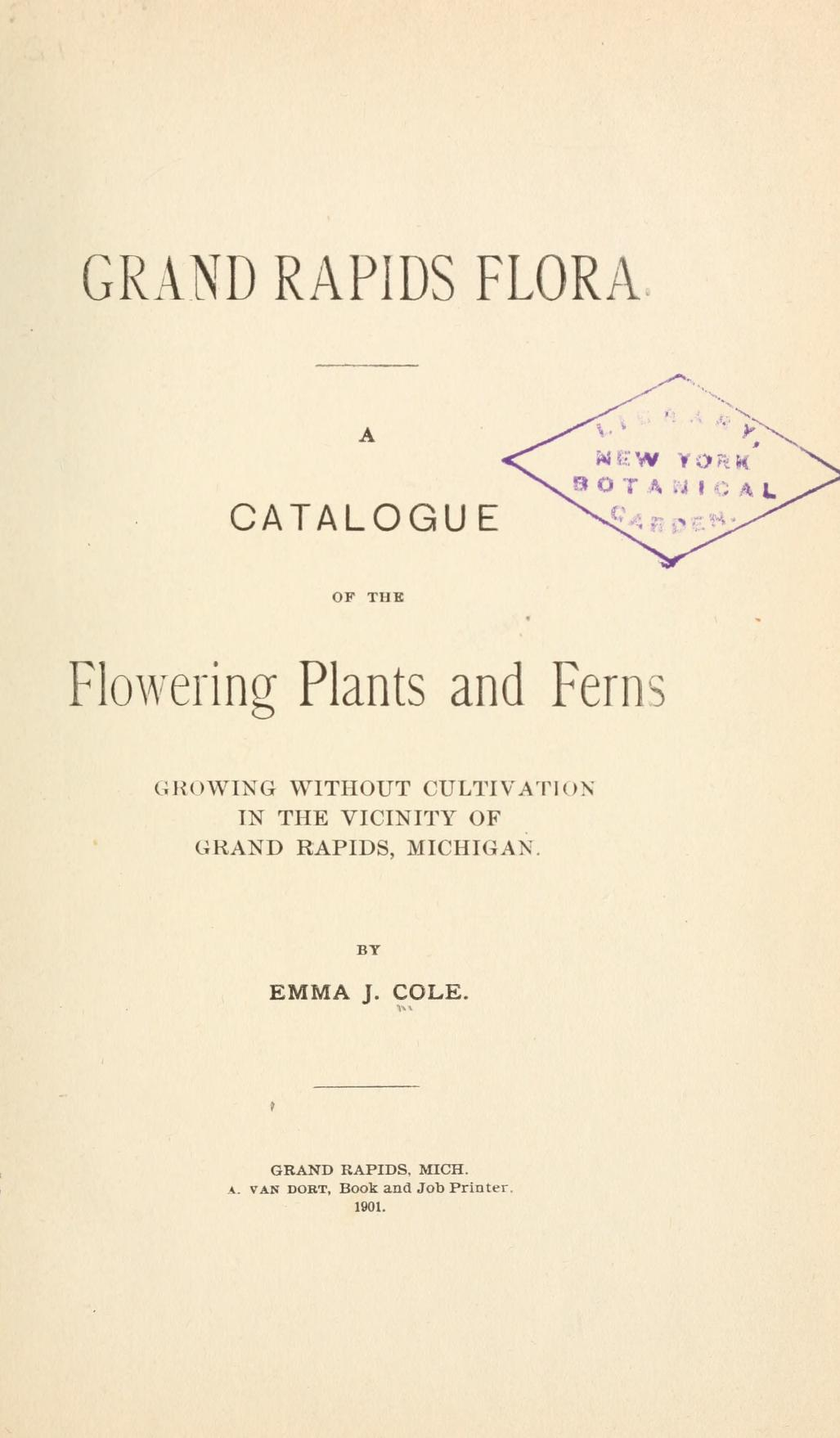
Title page of Grand Rapids Flora, from the collection of the New York Botanical Garden

Emma Cole worked as a teacher for much of her life. She was one of the first female members of the Kent Scientific Institute (predecessor of the Grand Rapids Public Museum), and served as the vice president and botanical curator.

Cole is well known for her 1901 book, Grand Rapids Flora: A Catalogue of the Flowering Plants and Ferns Growing Without Cultivation in the Vicinity of Grand Rapids, Michigan. Realizing the need for a local reference in her teaching, Cole set out to document all the vascular plants present in Grand Rapids and its surrounding townships. To create this substantial botanical reference, she collected specimens from 1892 to 1900, creating a comprehensive survey of nearly 1300 taxa found in the greater Grand Rapids area.

As a working professional botanist, Cole corresponded with many notable botanists and scientists of her time, including Benjamin Lincoln Robinson, Merritt Lyndon Fernald, and Charles Sprague Sargent (Arnold Arboretum).

== Death and legacy ==
Emma Cole died of kidney failure on April 25, 1910, in San Antonio, Texas, following a trip to Mexico. She is buried in Bailey Cemetery in Lowell, Michigan.

Cole's will funded three bequests:

- The department of Ecology and Evolutionary Biology at the University of Michigan awards the Emma J. Cole Fellowship in Botany to a graduate student.
- The Board of Education of Grand Rapids was granted a trust to buy botany equipment for Central High School.
- The Emma J. Cole Flower Fund funded biannual "flower services" at eight Grand Rapids churches. The Emma J. Cole collection (held at the Grand Rapids Public Library) documents these "flower services."

Plant specimens collected by Cole are still used for research and study at herbariums including the University of Michigan Herbarium, the Michigan State University herbarium, the Albion College herbarium and the herbarium of the Smithsonian National Museum of Natural History.

A species of hawthorn that Cole discovered, Crataegus coleae, was named for her. Charles Sprague Sargent wrote of the honor:

It is a pleasure to associate with this handsome shrub the name of its discoverer, Miss Emma J. Cole of Grand Rapids, Michigan, the author of The Grand Rapids Flora, and a careful and industrious student of the plants of central Michigan, where she has made a number of other important discoveries.

Cole was inducted into the Michigan Women's Hall of Fame in 2007.

A project at Calvin University from 2014 to 2018 attempted to revisit and assess all the locations described in Grand Rapids Flora. The Friends of Grand Rapids Parks together with Calvin University students are conducting botanical inventories for their Emma Cole Project at 12 different local parks, including Ken-O-Sha Park.
