= Ramona Park =

Former amusement park in East Grand Rapids, Michigan

Ramona Amusement Park
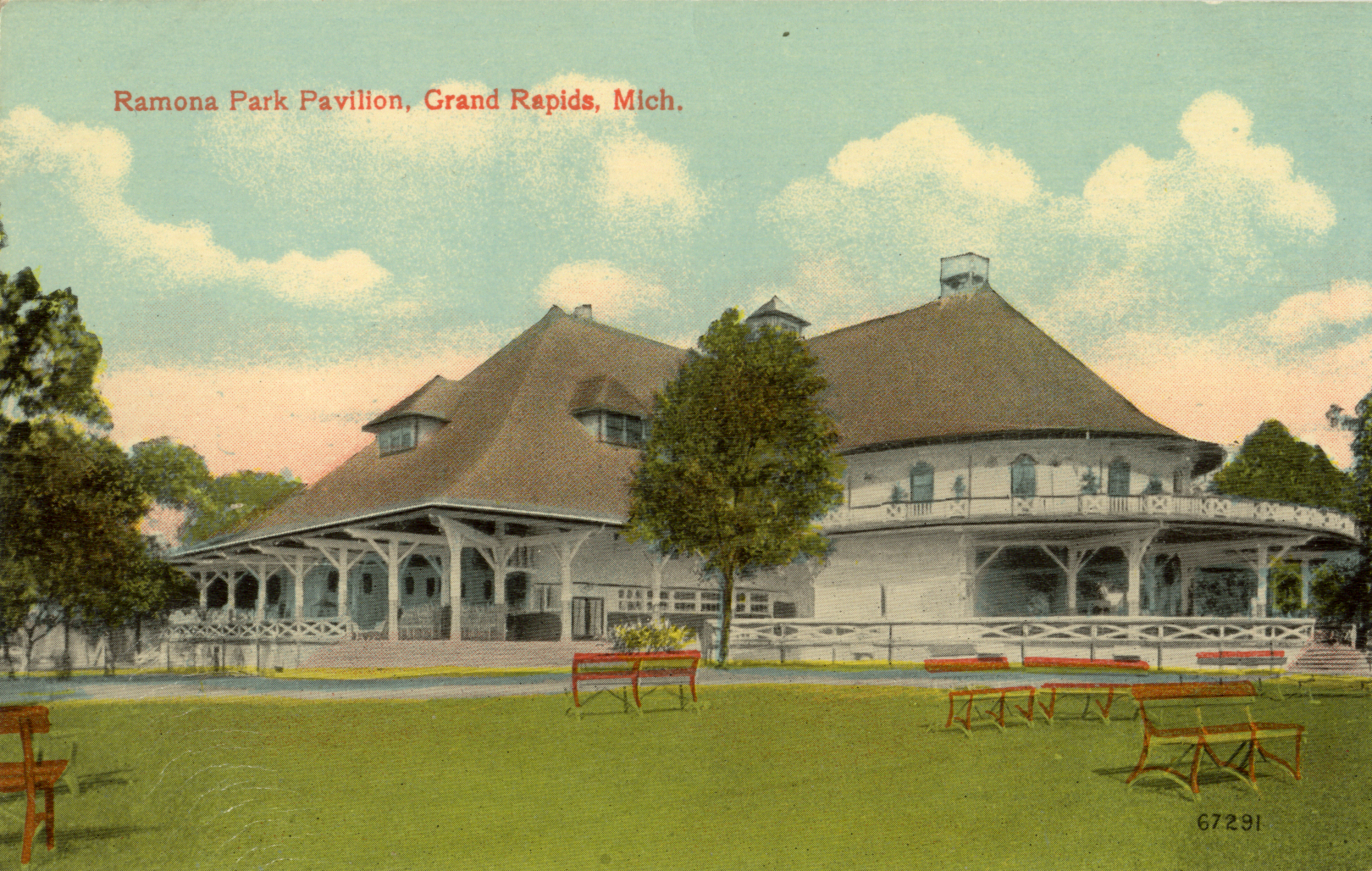
- Interactive map of Ramona Amusement Park
- Location: East Grand Rapids, Michigan, United States
- Coordinates: 42.9511°N 85.6131°W
- Status: Defunct
- Opened: 1881
- Closed: 1955

Attractions
- Roller coasters: 1

Ramona Park was an amusement park located in the city of East Grand Rapids, Michigan between 1881 and 1955. The Park included a double track wooden roller coaster, a theater pavilion, a ridable miniature railway and boat livery.

== History ==
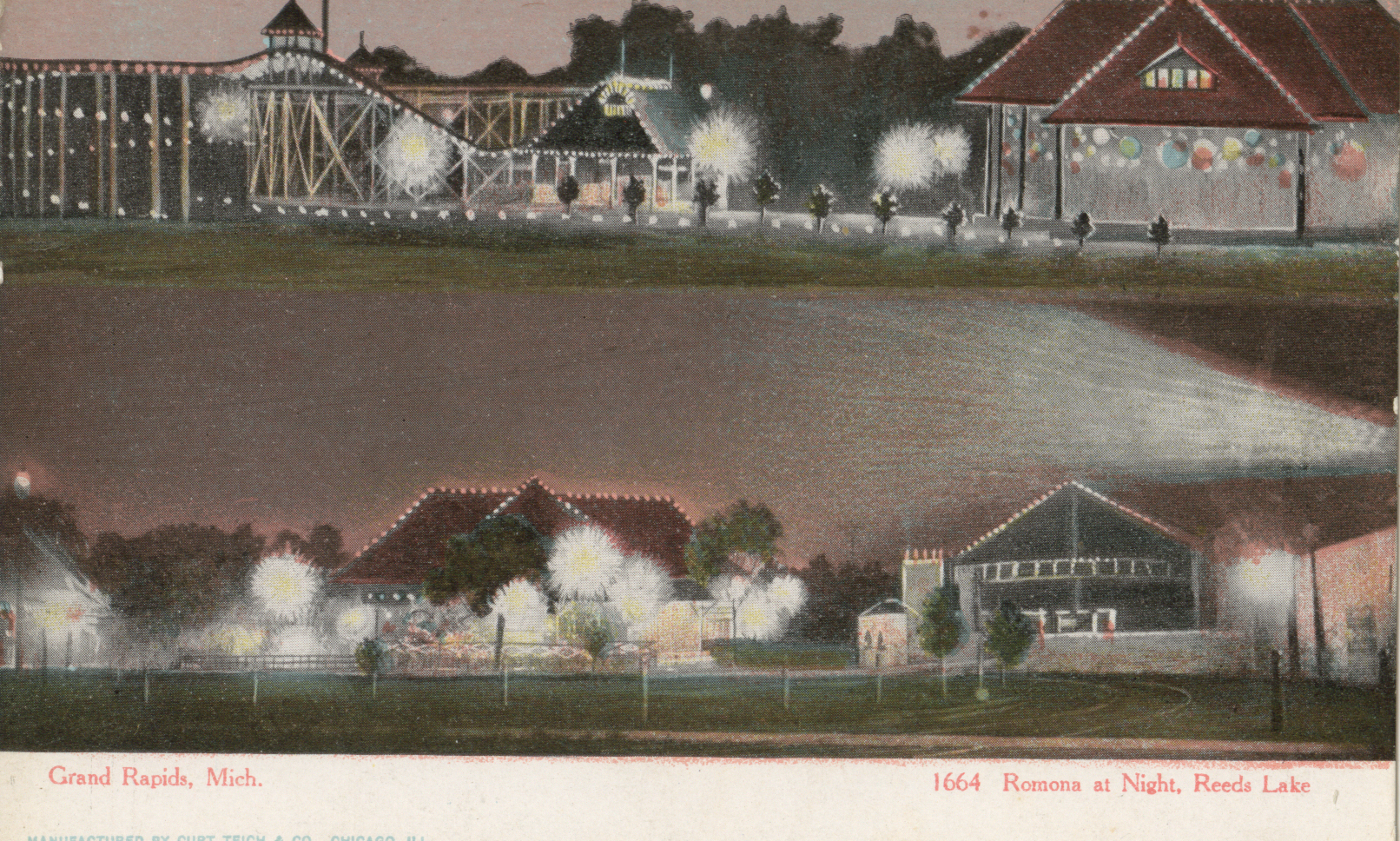
Ramona Park at Night, Reeds Lake, East Grand Rapids, MI.

Ramona Park was located on the west shore of Reeds Lake in East Grand Rapids, Michigan, and owned and operated by the Grand Rapids Street Railway Company, a trolley park. By 1921 the Ramona Amusement Corporation was formed and managed by the Railway Company. Trolley parks were common in the United States from the late 1800s into the mid twentieth century. Local transportation companies received fares for patrons riding the trolleys and also park admittance fees. A good example of a trolley park is Coney Island.

Through the years people traveled to Reeds Lake and Ramona Park from Grand Rapids and other cities in West Michigan, first using horse-drawn trams, street steam railroad, interurban, electric streetcars or trolleys and finally, by the mid-1930s, city buses. The cars and bus routes were always, and still remain today, number 6.

Reeds Lake was a summertime destination spot for years before the Park was established. The Lake was several miles from the city of Grand Rapids. There were picnic grounds, pavilions for entertainment, and boat liveries that supplied flat-bottomed skiff boats. As early as the 1850s passenger steam boats carried up to several hundred passengers. Captain John Honore Poisson was followed by his sons, Charles and Joseph, and grandsons, John and William as excursion steam boat captains.

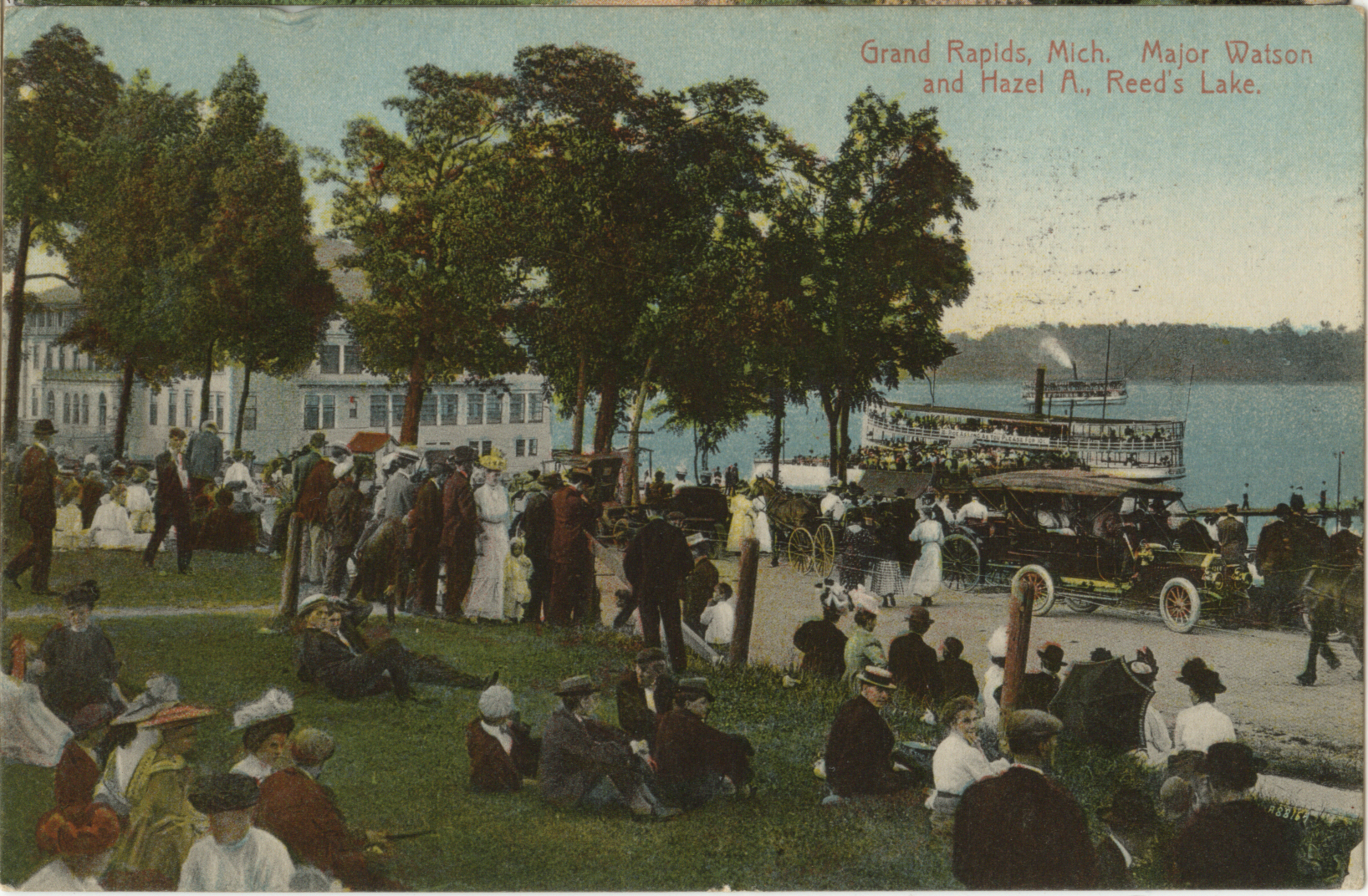
Reeds Lake, East Grand Rapids, MI., was a favorite summer-time destination.

In 1872 the Reeds Lake and Grand Rapids Railway was established and used horse powered trams. A 10-ton steam engine, powerful enough to pull three open train cars all the way to Reeds Lake, was introduced in 1877.

Future President of the United States Gerald Ford worked at Ramona Park. In 1954 the citizens of East Grand Rapids voted to close the park and raze it in favor of residential apartments and retail stores and shopping centers.

== Features ==
The original wooden roller coaster was a single track in a figure eight, which operated beginning in 1903. The Giant Coaster was built in 1913, and Ingersoll's Derby Racer in 1914. It was soon renamed the Jack Rabbit Derby Racer. Jack Rabbit was a double wooden-track roller coaster with an 80 percent drop, and it stood out as the most popular ride at the park and was one of only two double track roller coasters in the country.

The Ramona Theatre Pavilion sat majestically on the East Side of the Park on Lakeside Drive, near the boat landing and overlooking Reeds Lake. It was an extremely popular summertime venue that could seat 1,700 people. Popular plays, musicals, Vaudeville and burlesque acts, silent films, talkies and favorite local and national entertainers, such as Will Rogers, appeared at the theatre during its heyday.

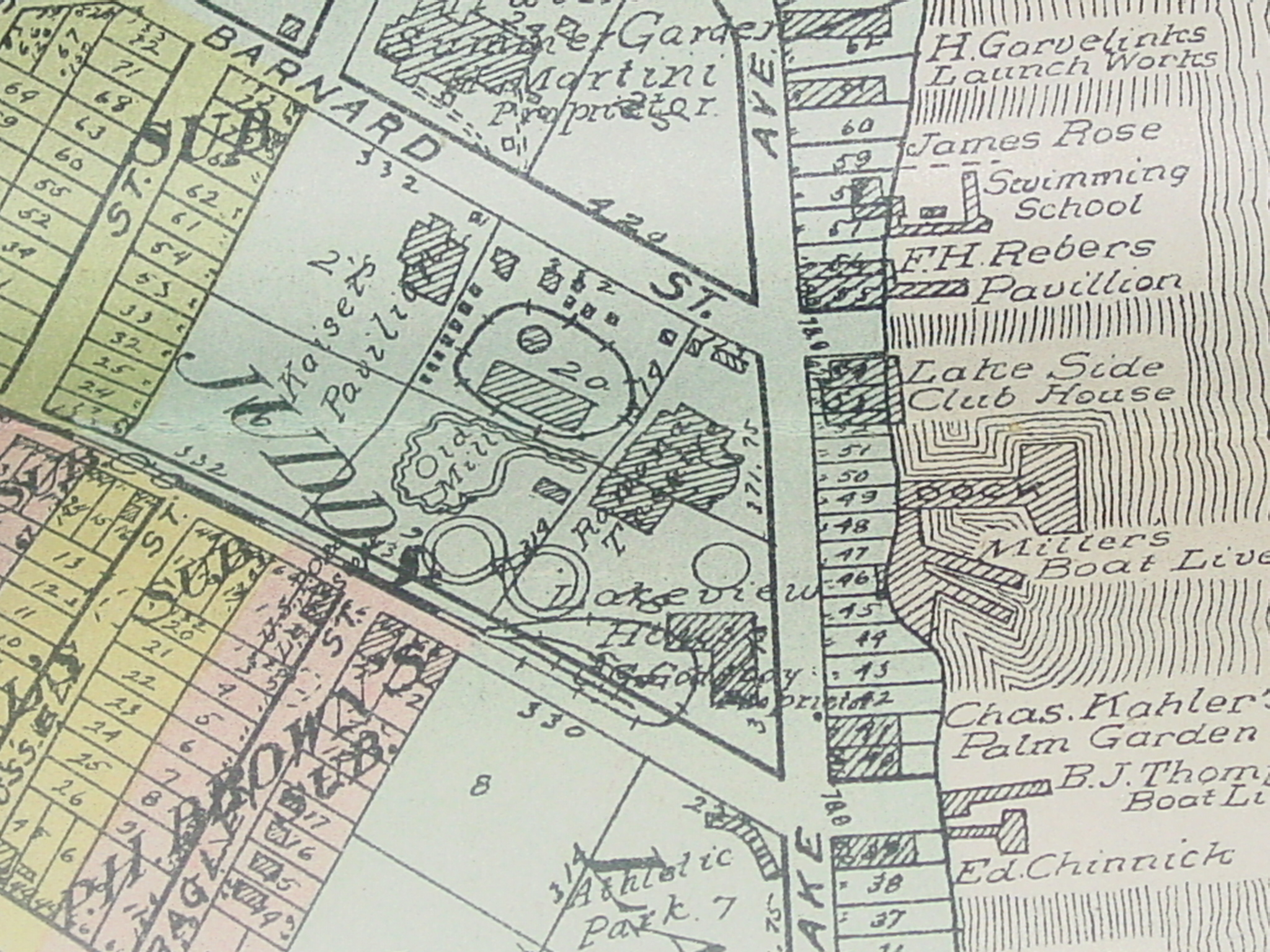
Detail of plat map of Kent County, MI showing detail of Reeds Lake amusement park.

The Point Paulo resort was also located along the shores of Reeds Lake in the early 1900s, and was created as vacation spot for touring actors. Frederick Paulo and Maurice Bellclaire developed the colony, which had over thirty cabins during the height of its popularity.

=== The Midway ===
The midway was located as an extension of where Barnard Street boat landing is now. Mid-way amusement rides included:

- Flying Scooters
- Figure 8 roller coaster
- Venetian Swings
- Ferris wheel
- Aero-swings
- Kiddie Auto
- Merry-go-round
- Mystic Chutes
- Loop-O-Plane
- Fun House
- Games of chance
- Food Concessions

=== Roller Coaster ===
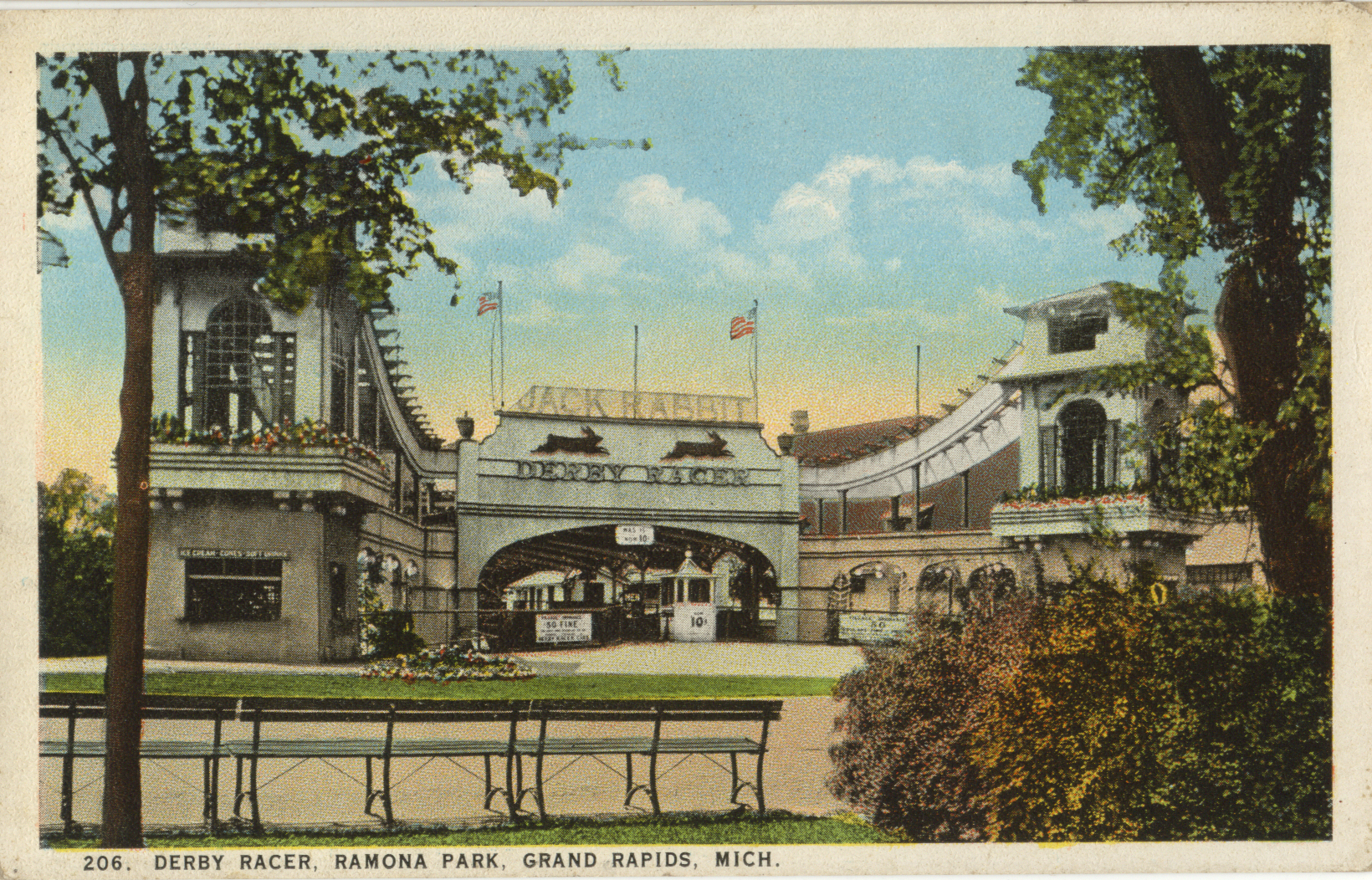
Jack Rabbit Derby Racer at Ramona Park, East Grand Rapids, MI.

John J. McElwee and his brother, James owned and operated the carousel and the figure 8 roller coaster by the early 1900s, and built the wooden double-tracked Jack Rabbit Derby Racer in Ramona Park in 1914.

=== Ramona Theater Pavilion ===
Ramona Theater, also known as the Ramona Theatre Pavilion, began as an open-air theater. It was enclosed in the early 1900s and became a popular attraction. On July 16, 1905, the Leroy Trio, made up of drag performer Gene Leroy, and two teenage singers, Johnnie Morris and Julius Marx, performed at the Ramona Theatre, which was Groucho Marx's professional debut. Many Vaudeville acts performed there during the 1920s and 1930s. Celebrities such as Edgar Bergen, the Marx Brothers, Jimmy Durante, Joan Davis, Jack Benny, Fred Allen and Will Rogers plied their talents here, along with Buster Keaton, Fanny Brice, and many others. The A.B. Marcus shows were extremely popular during the 1930s and 1940s. Troupes of beautiful girls sang and danced at stage shows that were priced at 10 to 50 cents per show. In the early days one could even see movies there.

=== Ridable Miniature Railroad ===
The Ramona Park Railway miniature locomotive was always a hit with the crowds, carrying as many as 50,000 people a year in its heyday. This made to scale steam locomotive and the open cars could carry 30 or more people on a half mile ride through and around the park. It was owned and operated by the Harry D. Glidden Family of East Grand Rapids.

=== Baseball ===
The Detroit Tigers stage a "home" Sunday game there on May 24, 1903.

On August 15, 1932, the Philadelphia Phillies defeated a team of Grand Rapids All-Stars 2 to 0 at Ramona Park.

== Founder ==
Benjamin Hanchett was the President and General Manager of the Grand Rapids Street Railway Company 4 and an important Ramona Park developer. He began management of the Company in 1904. The Park began to flourish under his direction. Hanchett was a resident of East Grand Rapids and served as its Village President from 1908 to 1911; and was a Director of Old Kent Bank, Regent of the University of Michigan and was a direct descendant of the Jenison family, Jenison, Michigan.

== Current day ==
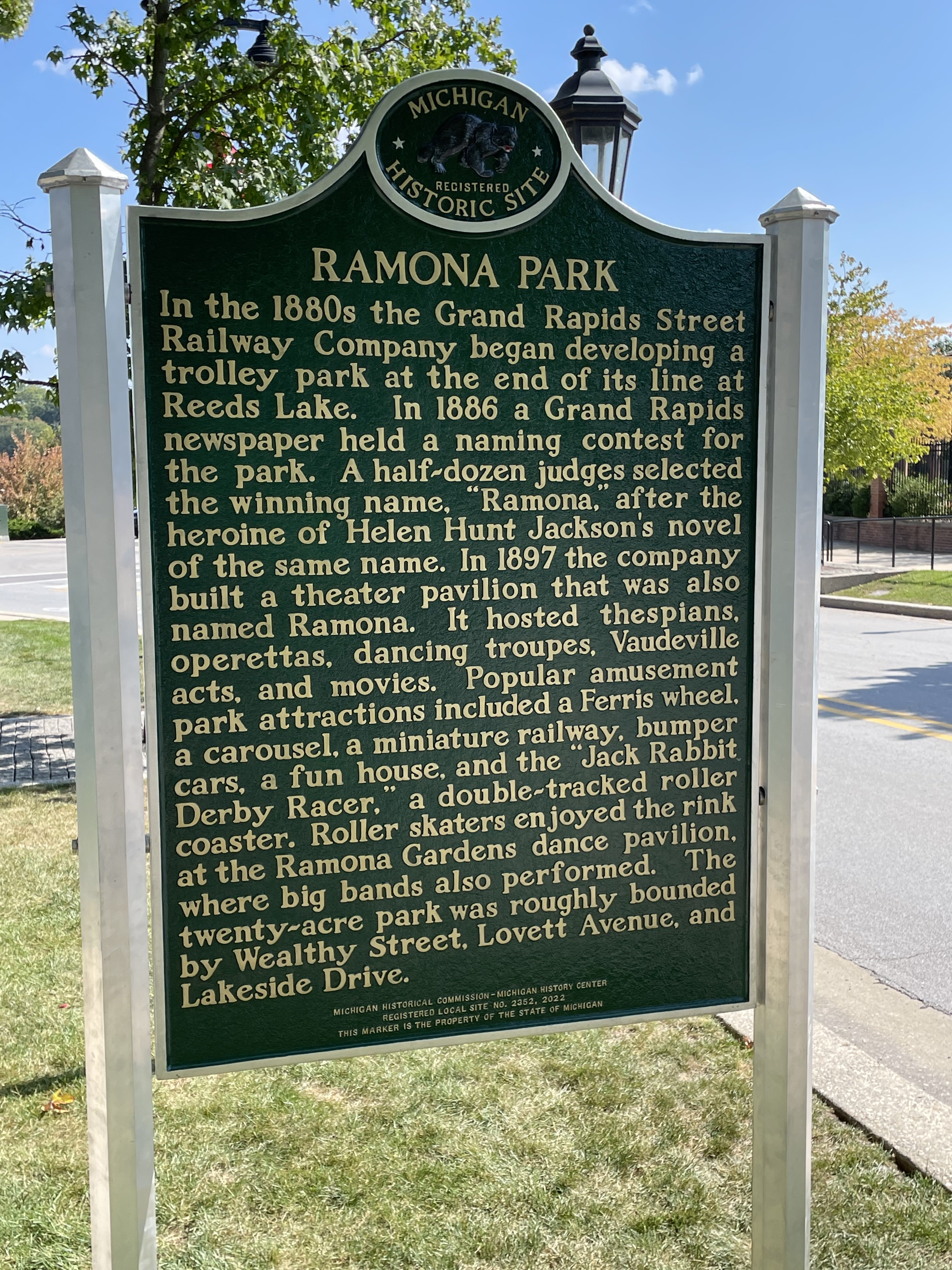
This sign marking Ramona Park as a Michigan Historic Site was dedicated in 2023.

As of 2013, Ramona Park spanned these properties: D&W grocery store, Jade Pig Ventures and Property (former Jacobson’s Department Store), Lakeshore Club Condominiums and Lakewood Apartments, and the former Ramona Medical Center property. It was bordered by Wealthy Street on the south, Lovett Avenue on the west and Lakeside Drive on the east.

Gaslight Village, strip malls, condos, apartments, and D&W Grocery store now sit where Ramona once was. The East Grand Rapids branch of the Kent District Library has a room dedicated to the amusement park with artifacts.

"Big Bertha", an amusement park organ built in Paris that operated at Ramona, is now located at Disney's Grand Floridian Resort & Spa at the Walt Disney World Resort in the restaurant 1900 Park Fare.

Ramona Park
- Interactive map of Ramona Park
- 42.9498180116563°N 85.61238423724463°W

Michigan State Historic Site
- Designated: 2022; 4 years ago
- Reference no.: S2352

== See also ==
- East Grand Rapids Public Schools
- Reeds Lake

== Gallery ==
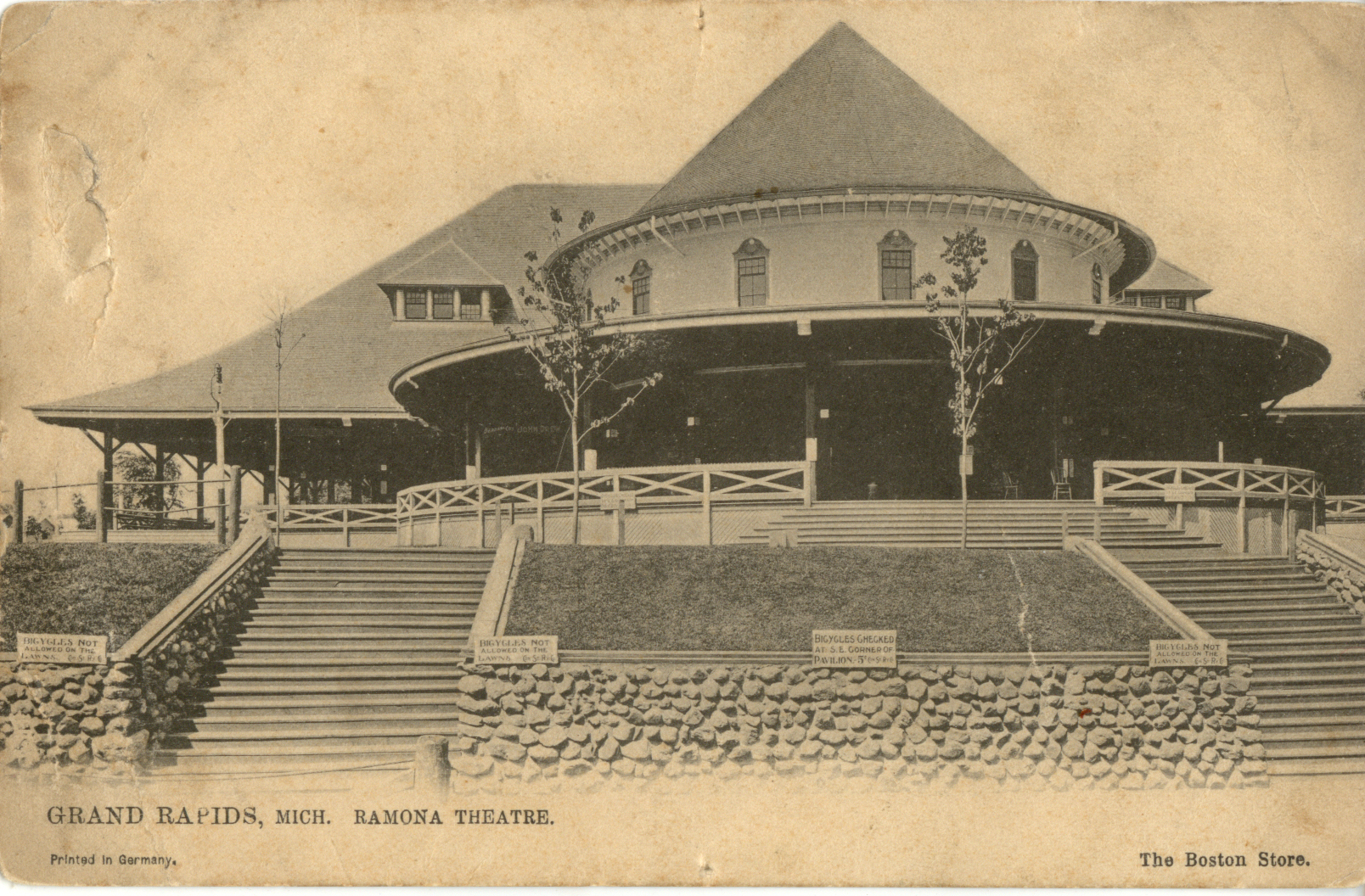

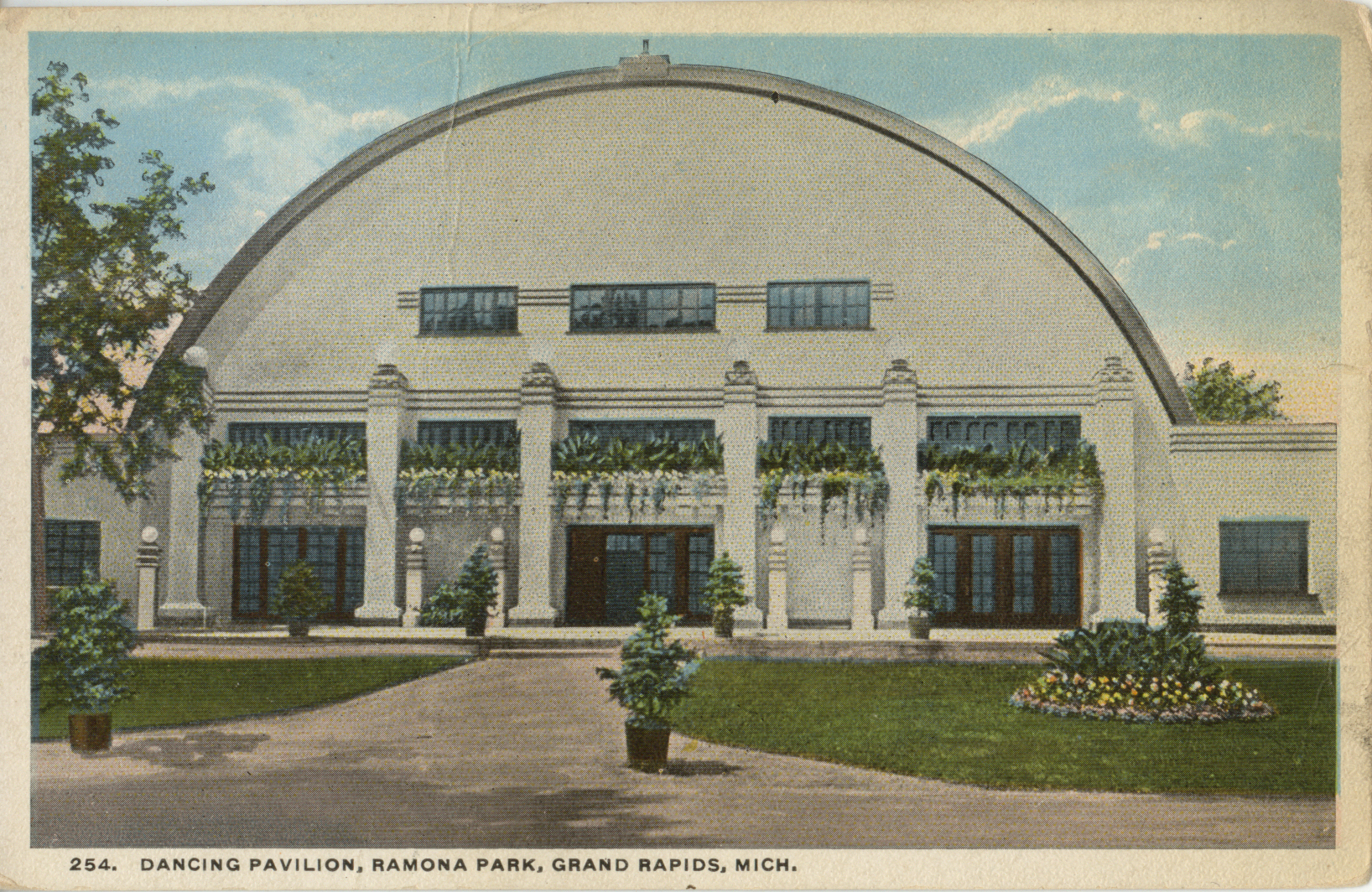

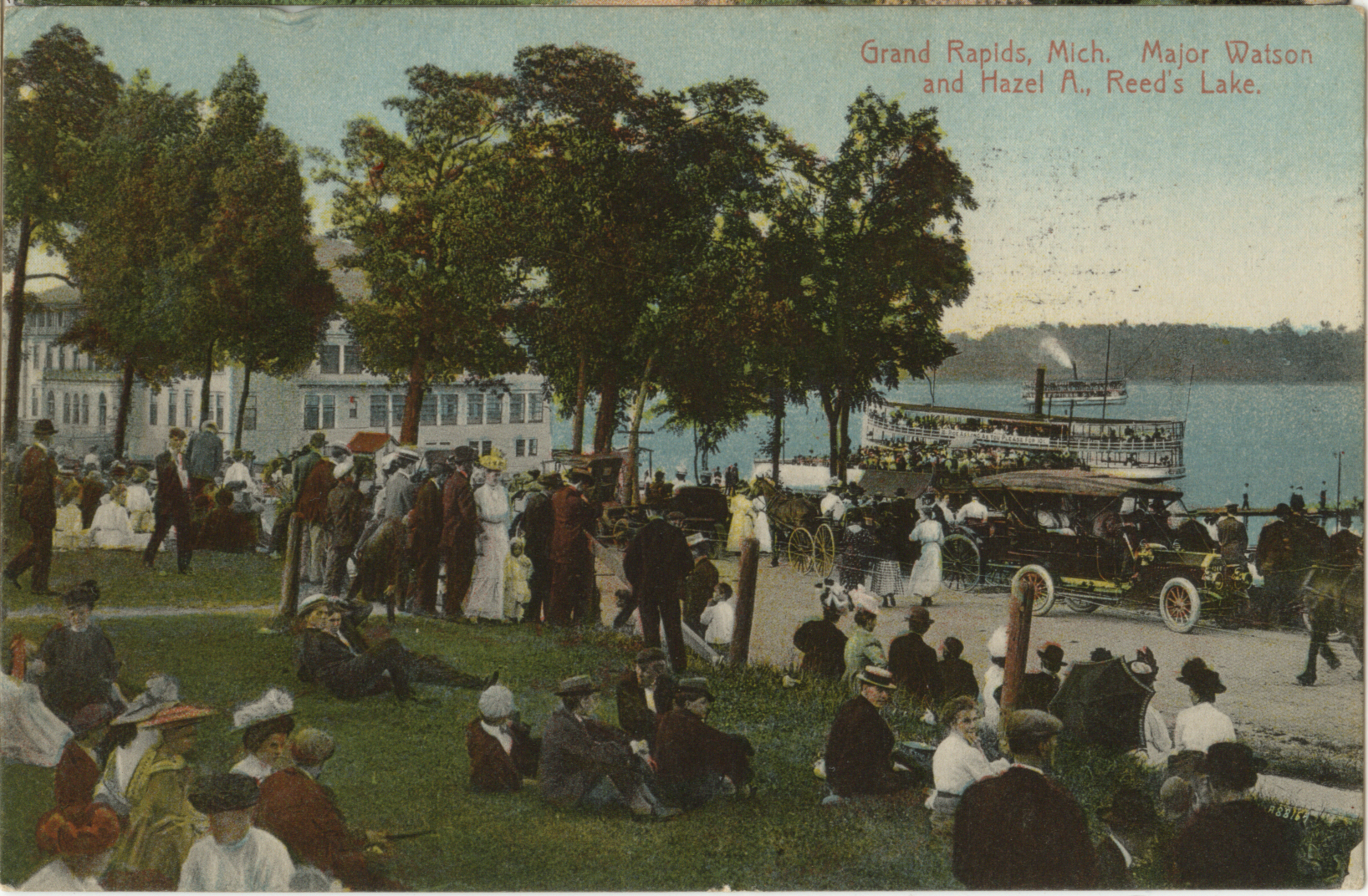

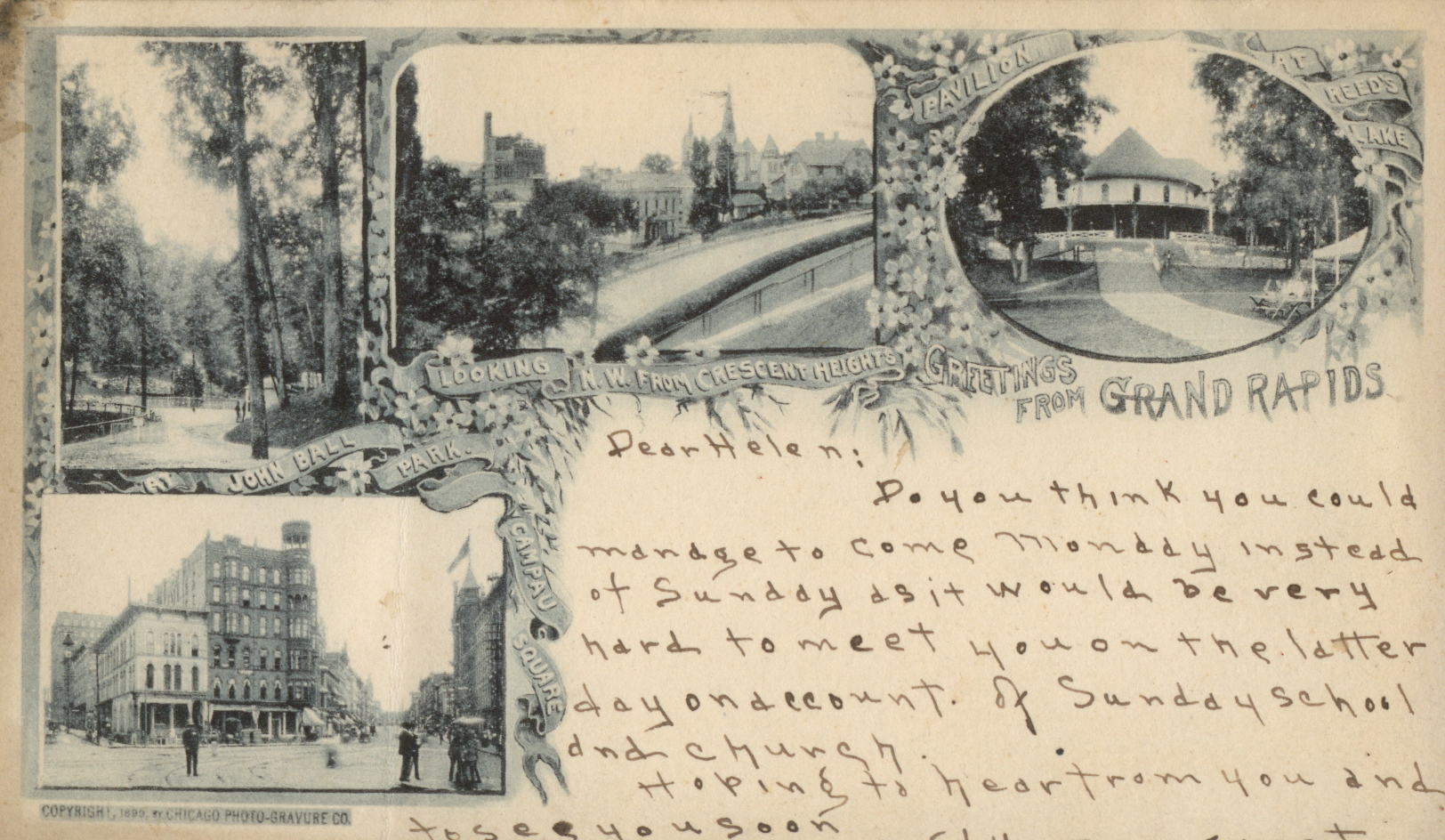
Greetings from Grand Rapids.

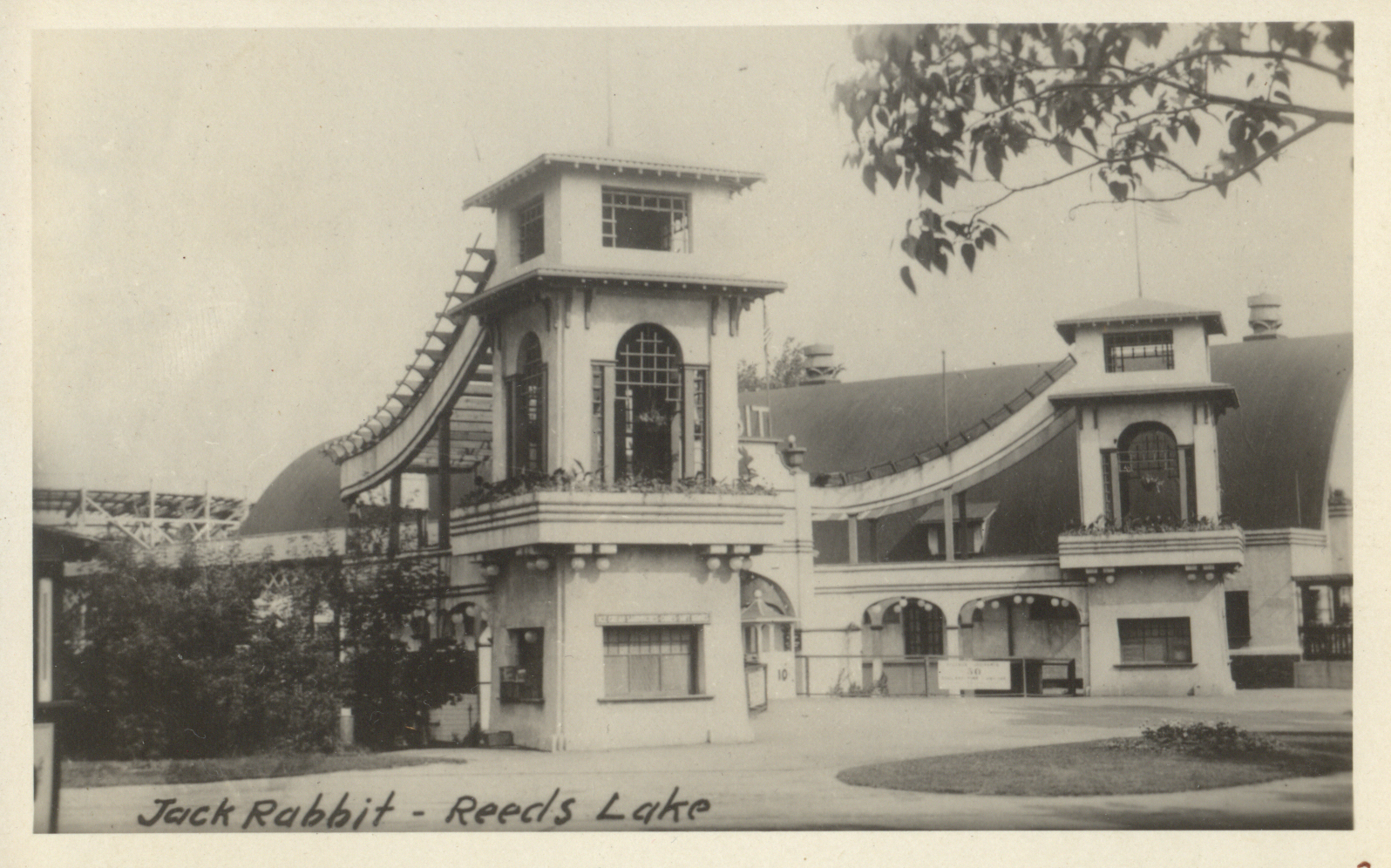

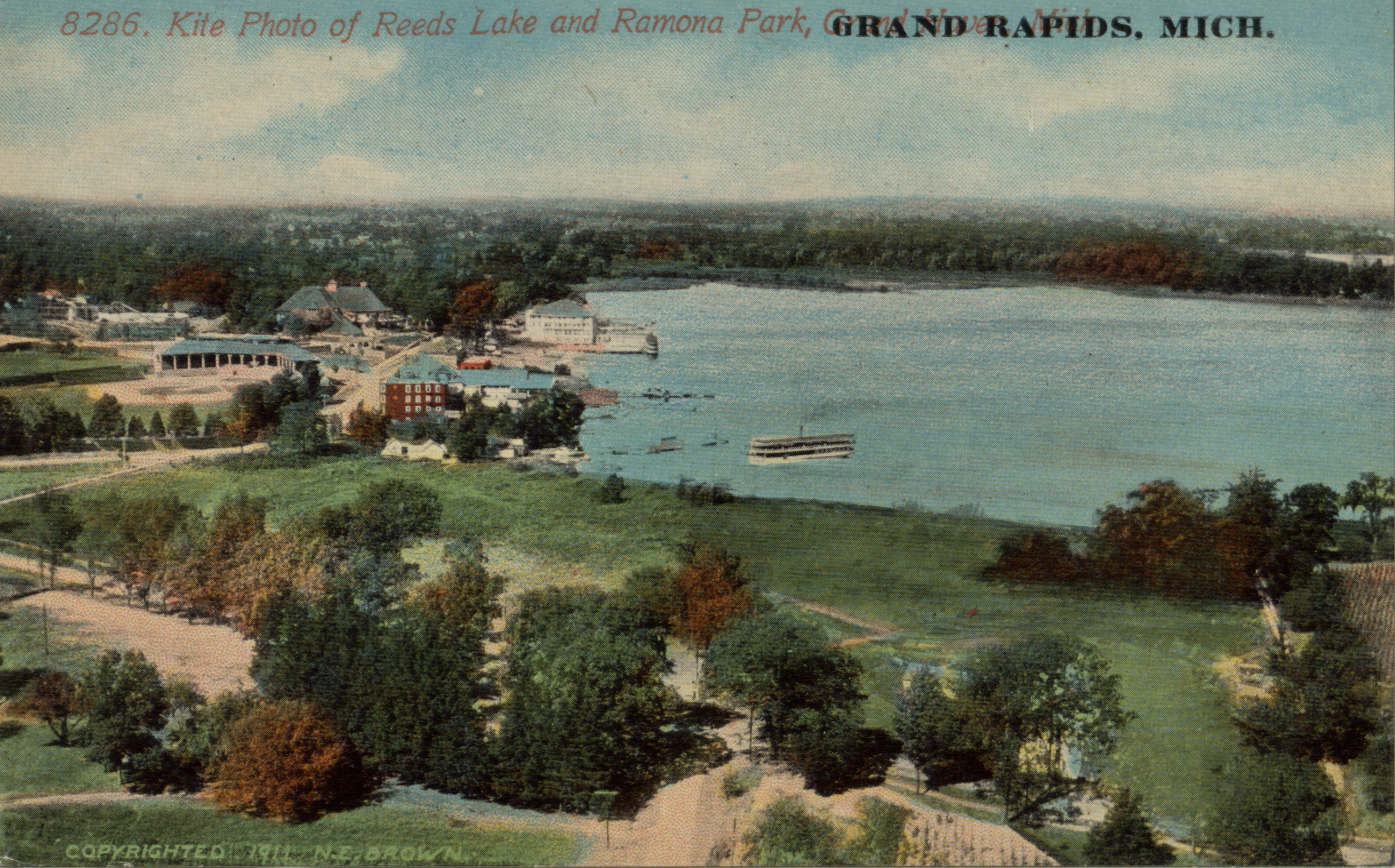

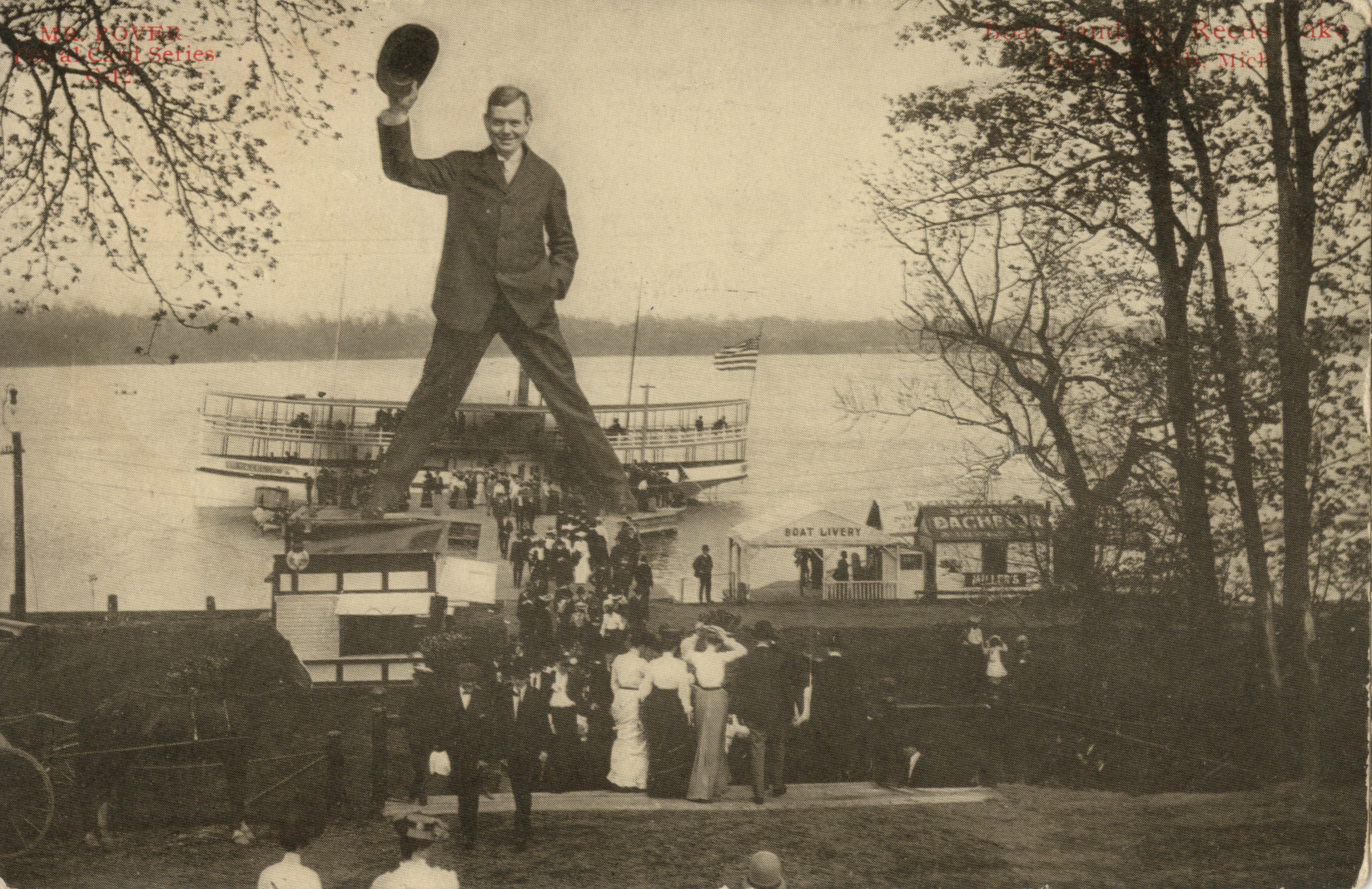

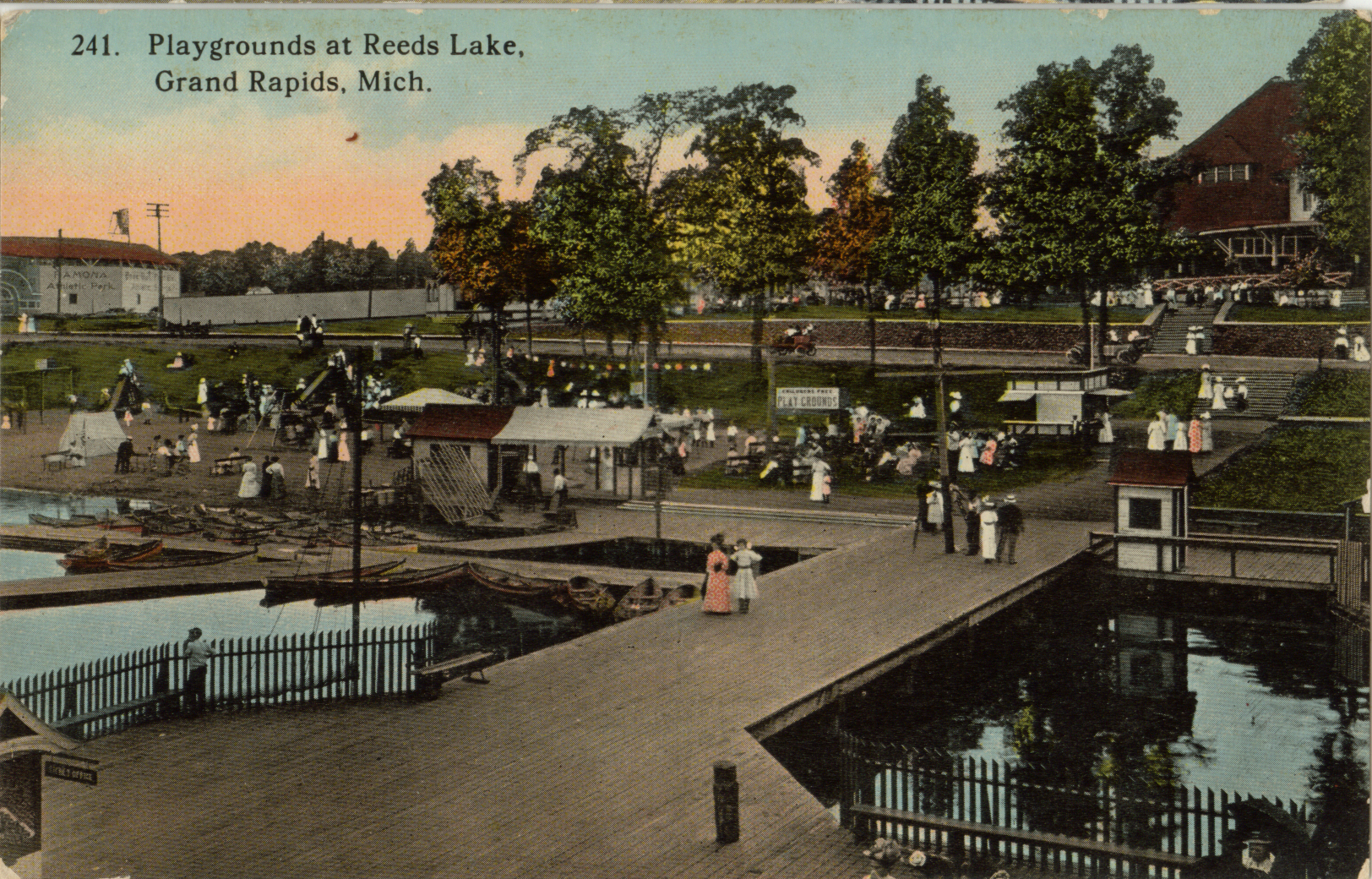

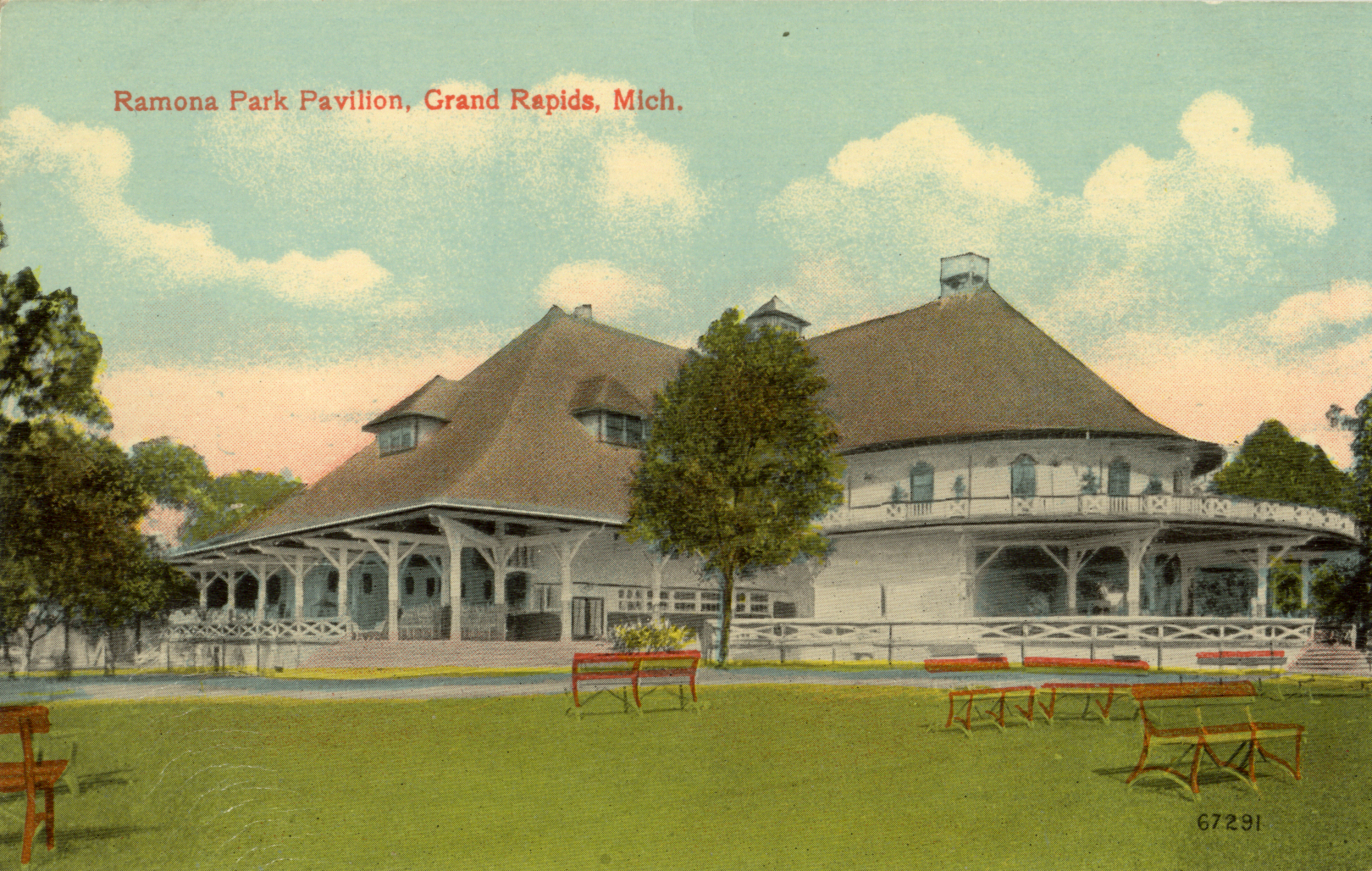

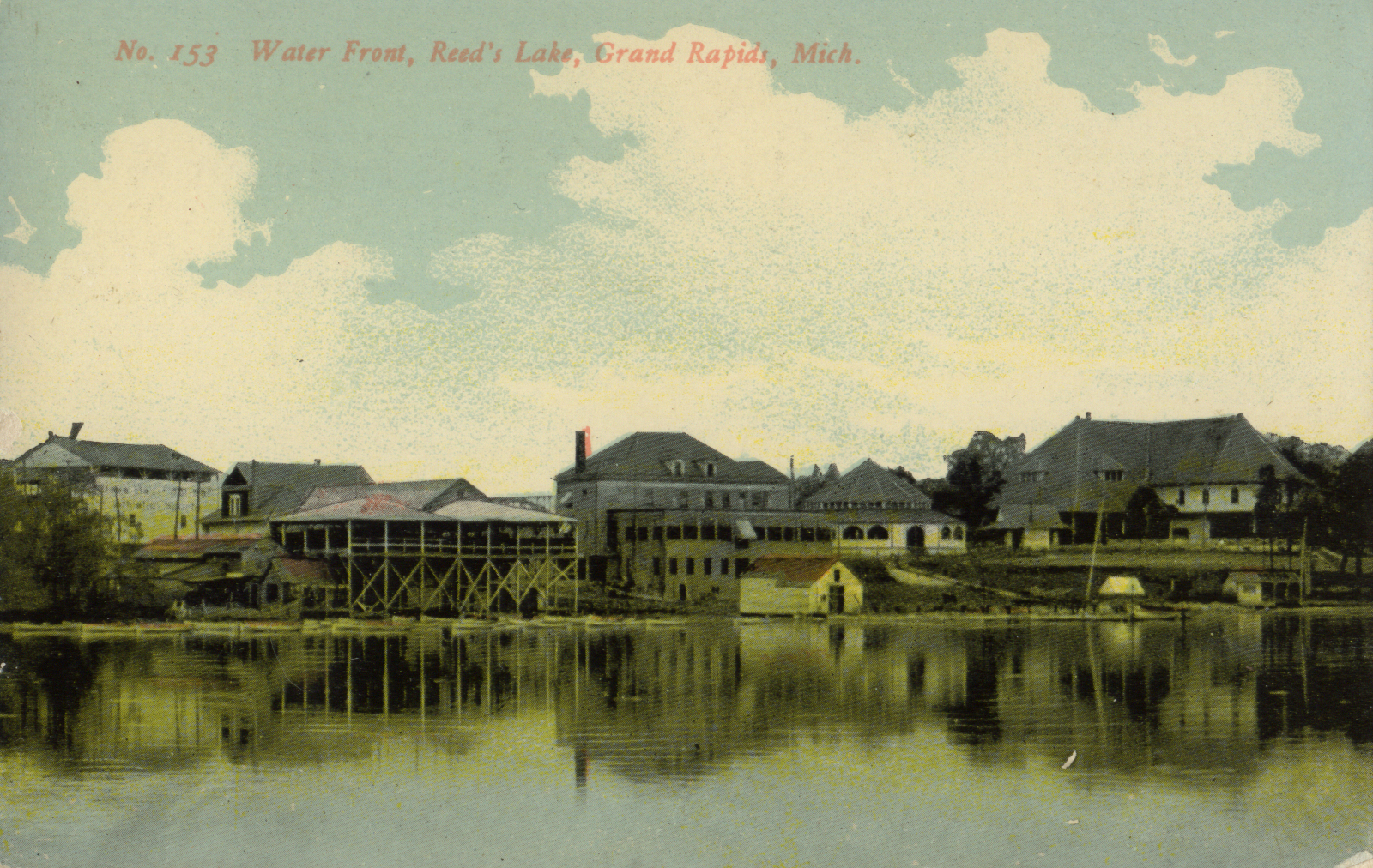
