= East Grand Rapids Public Schools =

School district in Michigan, U.S.

Address
- 2915 Hall Street SE East Grand Rapids, Michigan, 49506; United States

District information
- Grades: PreK-12
- Superintendent: Dr. Heidi S. Kattula
- Schools: 5
- Budget: US$42,161,000 (2022-23 expenditures)
- NCES District ID: 2612480

Students and staff
- Students: 2,992 (2024-25)
- Teachers: 163.63 FTE (2024-25)
- Staff: 292.89 FTE (2024-25)
- Student–teacher ratio: 18.29 (2024-2025)

Other information
- Website: www.egrps.org

East Grand Rapids Public Schools is a school district located in East Grand Rapids, Michigan. The district boundaries mirror the city limits except for a small grouping of homes north of the city in Grand Rapids.

== History ==
East Grand Rapids High School opened in fall 1963. The architect was Louis C. Kingscott and Associates. It replaced a building that had been used as the high school since 1928. That building became Wealthy Elementary with the opening of the 1963 high school. The first Wealthy Street Elementary had been built in 1917.

The current superintendent of East Grand Rapids public schools is Dr. Heidi Kattula, who began her tenure in the fall of 2018.

The high school's 671-seat auditorium opened in October 2002. As part of the bond issue passed in 2023, the high school will be substantially reconstructed. Phase one of the new facility is planned to open in fall 2028, and phase two in 2030.

== Schools ==
Schools in East Grand Rapids Public Schools district
School	Address	Notes
East Grand Rapids High School	2211 Lake Drive SE, East Grand Rapids	Grades 9–12. Built 1963.
East Grand Rapids Middle School	2425 Lake Drive SE, East Grand Rapids	Grades 6–8. Built 1956.
Breton Downs Elementary School	2500 Boston Street SE, East Grand Rapids	Grades K-5. Built 1930.
Lakeside Elementary School	2325 Hall Street SE, East Grand Rapids	Grades K-5. Built 1952.
Wealthy Elementary School	1961 Lake Drive SE, East Grand Rapids	Grades K-5. Built 1928, formerly East Grand Rapids High School.
Woodcliff Early Childhood Center	2915 Hall St. SE, Grand Rapids	Preschool. Built 1955

=== Former schools ===
Former schools include Manhattan Elementary School (razed, site now part of Manhattan Park) and Woodcliff Elementary School. It now houses the Morse Administration Center and the Early Childhood Center. The administration center is named after former superintendent Dr. James Morse.

== Athletics ==
East Grand Rapids High School has won more state championships than any public high school in Michigan. East Grand Rapids' school colors are blue and gold, and their nickname is the Pioneers. The school fight song is Onward East to the tune of On Wisconsin.
