= East Grand Rapids, Michigan =

City in Michigan, United States

- City
- City of East Grand Rapids
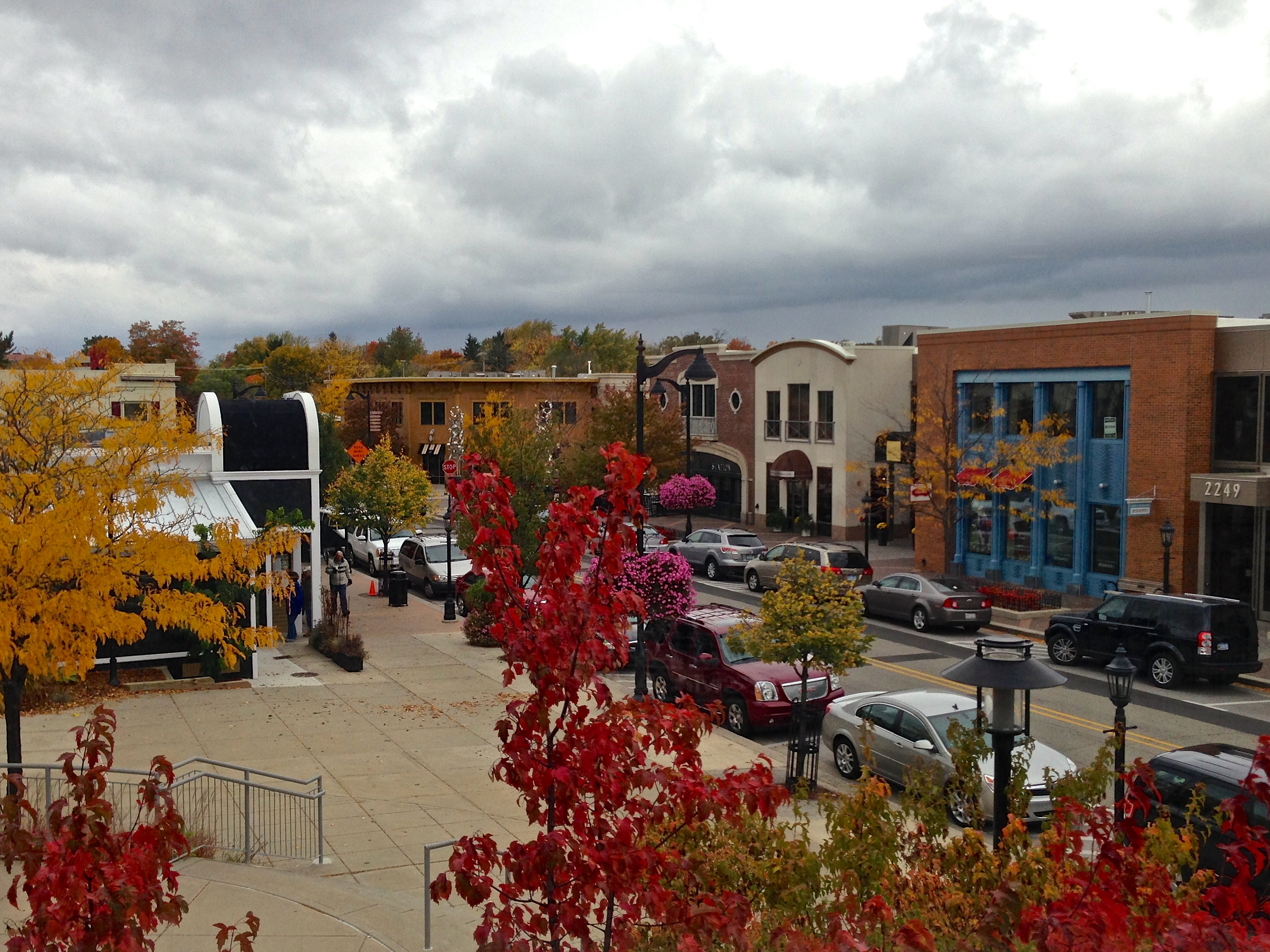
- Looking west along Wealthy Street

- Seal

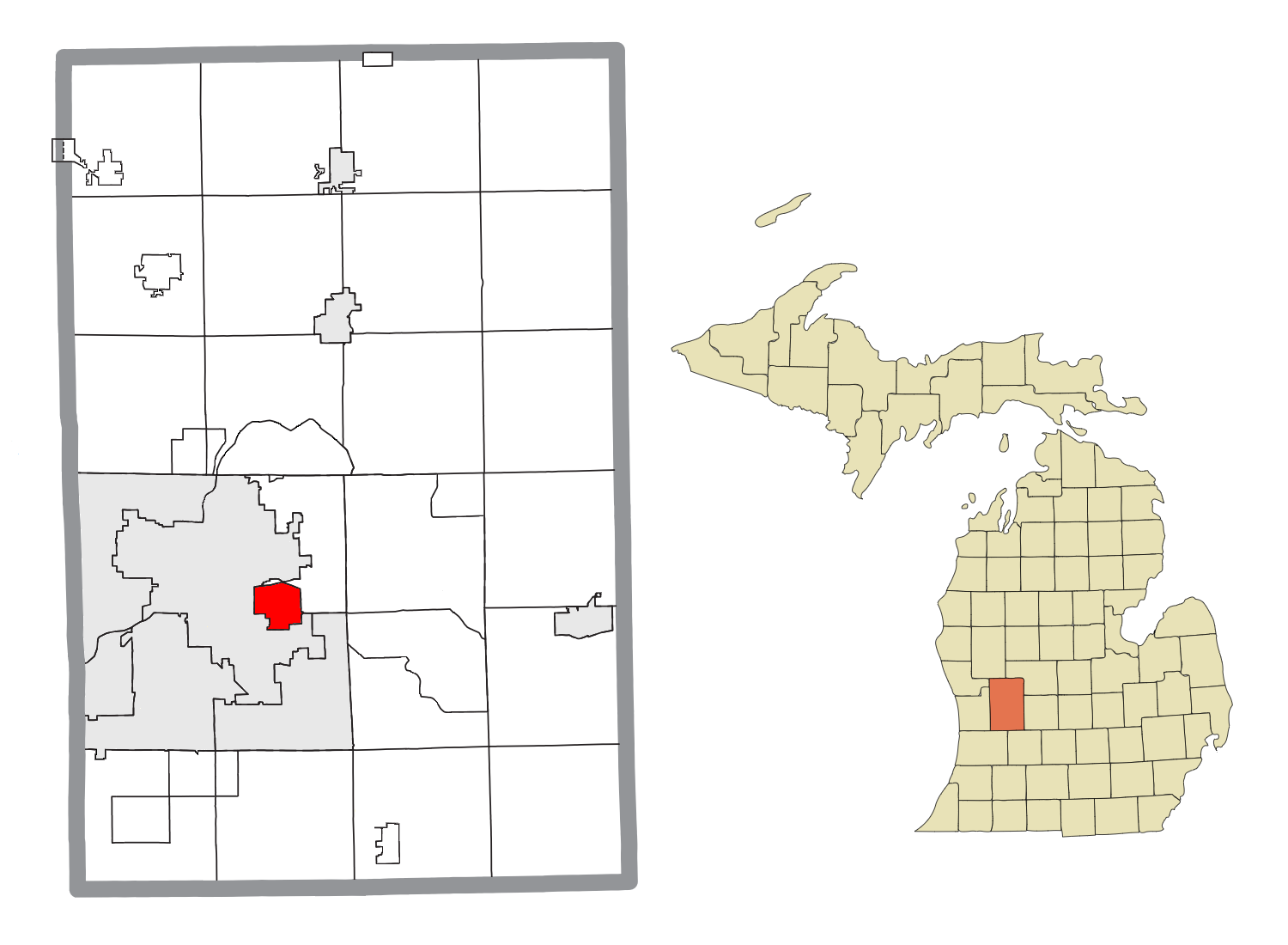
- Location within Kent County

- Location within the state of Michigan Location within the United States
- Coordinates: 42°57′03″N 85°36′56″W
- Country: United States
- State: Michigan
- County: Kent
- Incorporated: 1891 (village); 1926 (city)

Government
  - Mayor: Katie Favale
  - Clerk: Karen Brower
  - Manager: Shea Charles

Area
  - Total: 3.39 sq mi (8.78 km^{2})
  - Land: 2.93 sq mi (7.58 km^{2})
  - Water: 0.46 sq mi (1.20 km^{2})
- Elevation: 745 ft (227 m)

Population (2020)
  - Total: 11,371
  - Density: 3,883.5/sq mi (1,499.41/km^{2})
- Time zone: UTC-5 (EST)
  - Summer (DST): UTC-4 (EDT)
- ZIP code(s): 49506; 49546 (Grand Rapids)
- Area code: 616
- FIPS code: 26-23980
- GNIS feature ID: 0625189
- Website: Official website

East Grand Rapids is a city in Kent County in the U.S. state of Michigan. As of the 2020 census, the population was 11,371.

The city is part of the Grand Rapids metropolitan area, including Grand Rapids and Grand Rapids Township, but the city is administered autonomously.

== History ==
Reeds Lake

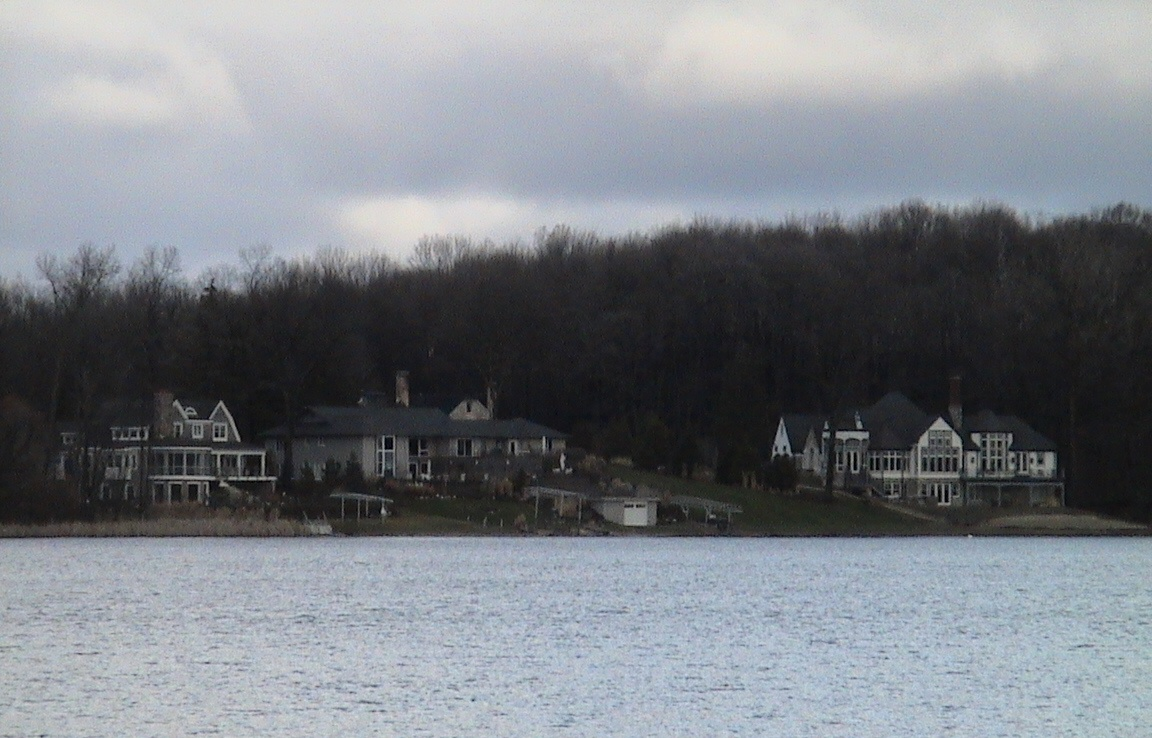
Lakefront mansions

Originally part of Paris Township, East Grand Rapids was first settled in the early 1830s by the Reed Family from New York City, New York. Miss Sophia Reed and Miss Euphemia Davis opened a school in 1834 near Reeds Lake. This involved construction of some school houses. Another schoolhouse was constructed in 1835 near Reeds Lake in the Grand River Valley, with Francis Prescott as one of its teachers. Residents voted to establish the Village of East Grand Rapids in 1891. The village was incorporated into a home rule city in 1926 when the population was approximately 1,300.

East Grand Rapids saw tourism from the Grand Rapids area for its geography and facilities. Reeds Lake attracted visitors as early as the 1870s as a destination for day trips and summertime activities. Two bathing beaches were located on Reeds Lake. Manhattan Beach on the north shore was established in 1884 and Rose's Bathing Beach on the west shore was established in 1901. They hosted boat launches, a bathhouse, restaurants, and resorts. Four steamboats owned by the Poisson family operated excursion rides on the lake starting in 1882.

Visitors to East Grand Rapids initially traveled by foot, stagecoach, or horse and buggy. In the mid-1870s, horse-drawn cars became available. Passengers would board in downtown Grand Rapids and transfer onto the Grand Rapids & Reeds Lake Railway. By 1877, a steam locomotive replaced the horse cars. Electric streetcars came into use in the early 1890s. They were replaced by buses as a mode of transportation in 1935. Interurban also brought residents from nearby cities to Reeds Lake.

The village's amusement park, Ramona Park, opened in 1897, a creation of the Grand Rapids Street Railway Company in order to increase use of their services. The park included amusement rides, games, concession stands, and two large pavilions where activities from theater to roller skating were hosted. Ramona Park closed in 1955 due to disrepair and dwindling demand. The land was eventually repurposed for apartments and a shopping center.

In 1974 East Grand Rapids came to national attention as the legal domicile of Gerald R. Ford, 38th President of the United States, however, as a serving Congressman and Vice-President, Ford had resided in the District of Columbia area for the previous twenty-five years.

=== Reconstruction ===
A local developer completed a new retail center as part of a $50 million project, which is also intended to include offices and multi-floor condominium buildings spread over a 4-acre (16,000 m^{2}) tract. In 2006, the City of East Grand Rapids performed a $3 million refurbishing of Wealthy Street with new paving, lighting, and decorative features. A new 27,700 ft^{2} (2573.41 m^{2}) library was opened in August 2006 at the site of the previous library on Reeds Lake, next to the Grand Rapids Yacht Club.

== Geography ==
According to the U.S. Census Bureau, the city has a total area of 3.39 square miles (8.78 km^{2}), of which 2.93 square miles (7.59 km^{2}) is land and 0.46 square miles (1.19 km^{2}) (13.57%) is water.

Reeds Lake and Fisk Lake comprise most of the water area.

== Education ==
East Grand Rapids Public Schools is composed of

- East Grand Rapids High School
- East Grand Rapids Middle School
- Wealthy Elementary
- Breton Downs Elementary
- Lakeside Elementary

== Government ==
East Grand Rapids has a council–manager government, with an elected commission composed of six elected Commissioners, two from each of the city's three wards, and a mayor, elected at-large. Elections occur in odd-numbered years.

In the United States House of Representatives, East Grand Rapids is located in Michigan's 3rd congressional district, represented by Democrat Hillary Scholten.

== Demographics ==
Historical population
Census	Pop.	Note	%±
1900	466		—
1910	800		71.7%
1920	1,310		63.8%
1930	4,024		207.2%
1940	4,899		21.7%
1950	6,403		30.7%
1960	10,924		70.6%
1970	12,565		15.0%
1980	10,914		−13.1%
1990	10,807		−1.0%
2000	10,764		−0.4%
2010	10,694		−0.7%
2020	11,371		6.3%
U.S. Decennial Census

=== 2020 census ===
As of the 2020 census, East Grand Rapids had a population of 11,371. The median age was 38.0 years. 30.9% of residents were under the age of 18 and 13.0% of residents were 65 years of age or older. For every 100 females there were 94.2 males, and for every 100 females age 18 and over there were 90.0 males age 18 and over.

Fully 100% of residents lived in urban areas; none lived in rural areas.

There were 3,851 households in East Grand Rapids, of which 46.5% had children under the age of 18 living in them. Of all households, 73.2% were married-couple households, 7.5% were households with a male householder and no spouse or partner present, and 16.8% were households with a female householder and no spouse or partner present. About 15.0% of all households were made up of individuals and 7.7% had someone living alone who was 65 years of age or older.

There were 3,999 housing units, of which 3.7% were vacant. The homeowner vacancy rate was 1.2% and the rental vacancy rate was 8.0%.

Racial composition as of the 2020 census
Race	Number	Percent
White	10,288	90.5%
Black or African American	114	1.0%
American Indian and Alaska Native	13	0.1%
Asian	208	1.8%
Native Hawaiian and Other Pacific Islander	2	0.0%
Some other race	69	0.6%
Two or more races	677	6.0%
Hispanic or Latino (of any race)	317	2.8%

=== 2010 census ===
As of the 2010 census, there were 10,694 people, 3,818 households, and 3,009 families residing in the city. The population density was 3,649.8 inhabitants per square mile (1,409.2/km^{2}). There were 3,977 housing units at an average density of 1,357.3 per square mile (524.1/km^{2}). The racial makeup of the city was 95.4% White, 1.1% African American, 0.1% Native American, 1.5% Asian, 0.2% from other races, and 1.6% from two or more races. Hispanic or Latino residents of any race were 1.5% of the population.

There were 3,818 households, of which 44.9% had children under the age of 18 living with them, 68.4% were married couples living together, 8.2% had a female householder with no husband present, 2.2% had a male householder with no wife present, and 21.2% were non-families. 17.9% of all households were made up of individuals, and 6.7% had someone living alone who was 65 years of age or older. The average household size was 2.80 and the average family size was 3.21.

The city had a median age of 39.8 years. Of the residents, 31.6% were under the age of 18, 5% were aged between 18 and 24, 22.5% were aged between 25 and 44, 31.4% were aged between 45 and 64, and 9.7% were 65 years of age or older. The gender makeup of the city was 48.3% male and 51.7% female.

=== 2000 census ===
As of the census of 2000, there were 10,764 people, 3,835 households, and 3,021 families residing in the city. The population density was 3,678.0 inhabitants per square mile (1,420.1/km^{2}). There were 3,940 housing units at an average density of 1,346.3 per square mile (519.8/km^{2}). The racial makeup of the city was 96.99% White, 0.98% African American, 0.13% Native American, 0.99% Asian, 0.01% Pacific Islander, 0.32% from other races, and 0.59% from two or more races. Hispanic or Latino residents of any race were 0.85% of the population.

There were 3,835 households, out of which 46.0% had children under the age of 18 living with them, 68.7% were married couples living together, 8.5% had a female householder with no husband present, and 21.2% were non-families. 18.2% of all households were made up of individuals, and 7.5% had someone living alone who was 65 years of age or older. The average household size was 2.81 and the average family size was 3.23.

In the city, 32.5% of the population was under the age of 18, 4.6% was from 18 to 24, 27.4% from 25 to 44, 25.4% from 45 to 64, and 10.1% was 65 years of age or older. The median age was 37 years. For every 100 females, there were 92.1 males. For every 100 females age 18 and over, there were 87.7 males.

The median income for a household in the city was $84,772, and the median income for a family was $98,967. Males had a median income of $66,528 versus $42,383 for females. The per-capita income for the city was $41,388. About 1.5% of families and 2.8% of the population were below the poverty line, including 2.2% of those under age 18 and 2.9% of those age 65 or over.

== Notable people ==
- Jim Boylen, former head coach of the NBA's Chicago Bulls and former head coach of the Utah Utes men's basketball team.
- Betty Ford, former First Lady of the United States.
- Gerald Ford, 38th President of the United States.
- Steven Ford, actor and son of Gerald Ford.
- William George, professor of management practice at Harvard Business School and former chairman and chief executive officer of Medtronic.
- Luke Glendening, professional hockey player.
- Adam Herz, writer for the film American Pie (the movie was based on his high school) Emmy Award- and Peabody Award-winning journalist.
- David Howitt, author of Heed Your Call and founder and CEO of The Meriwether Group.
- Luke Jensen, professional tennis athlete.
- Laura Kasischke, National Book Critics Circle Award winner, poet, novelist.
- Tom Lehman, professional golfer.
- David T. McLaughlin, former president of Dartmouth College and former president and chief executive officer of the Aspen Institute.
- Peter F. Secchia, former U.S. Ambassador to Italy.
- L. William Seidman, economist, financial commentator, and former head of the U.S. Federal Deposit Insurance Corporation.
- Gillian Sorensen, senior advisor at the United Nations Foundation and former U.N. Assistant Secretary-General for External Relations.
- Chris Van Allsburg, author of the children's book The Polar Express.
- Irving B. Weiner, past president of the American Psychological Association and the Society for Personality Assessment.
- Brian Vander Ark, singer/songwriter, former lead singer of The Verve Pipe.
