= The Curiosity of Chance =

- Release poster
- Directed by: Russell P. Marleau
- Written by: Russell P. Marleau
- Produced by: Lisa Schahet; Michael Gleissner
- Starring: Tad Hilgenbrink; Brett Chukerman
- Cinematography: Jack Messitt
- Edited by: Mark Rees
- Music by: Willie Aron; Josef Peters
- Production company: Bigfoot Entertainment
- Distributed by: TLA Releasing
- Release date: October 21, 2006 (Seattle)
- Running time: 105 minutes
- Countries: United States; Belgium
- Language: English
- Budget: €1 million (approx. USD$1.3 million)

The Curiosity of Chance is a 2006 comedy film directed by Russell P. Marleau, produced by Bigfoot Entertainment and starring Tad Hilgenbrink.

== Plot ==
In 1980s Europe, flamboyant and gay 16-year-old Chance Marquis shows up at an international high school in a top hat and tails, immediately attracting the attention of the "queer-hating" resident bully, among others. Through his involvement in the school newspaper, he meets an introverted photographer with a mysterious briefcase, and while practicing tennis, he befriends a catty fashionista, both of whom act as his wingmen in his new high school. He also meets the jock-next-door, with whom he forms a tentative friendship, despite the jock's cacophonous group of friends. The film follows Chance through a year of high school, with its attendant drama, successes, and hijinks—including sneaking into a drag bar, where Chance begins to explore his true self.

Themes underscored throughout the film include facing one's fears as one grows into adulthood, and the barriers that people put up in order to cope with life. Chance claims to be strong with his nonchalant attitude, but when photos of him in drag show up all over school, Chance must face his own preachings of staying true to oneself.

== Cast ==
- Tad Hilgenbrink as Chance Marquis
- Brett Chukerman as Levi Sparks
- Aldevina Da Silva as Twyla Tiller
- Pieter Van Nieuwenhuyze as Hank Hudson
- Chris Mulkey as Sir
- Maxim Maes as Brad Harden
- Colleen Cameron as Sienna Marquis
- Magali Uytterhaegen as Vice Principal Ophelia Smelker

== Accolades ==
- Winner "Best Narrative Feature" at The Chicago LGBT International Film Festival - Chicago, IL 2007
- Winner "Best New Director" at Seattle Lesbian & Gay Film Festival - Seattle, WA 2006
- Honorable Mention "Best Music in a Feature Film" at Nashville Film Festival - Nashville, TN 2007
- Chosen as one of the Audience's and Critic's "Best of the Fest" at the Palm Springs International Film Festival - Palm Springs, CA 2007

== See also ==
- List of lesbian, gay, bisexual, or transgender-related films by storyline
- Cross-dressing in film and television
