= List of American Pie characters =

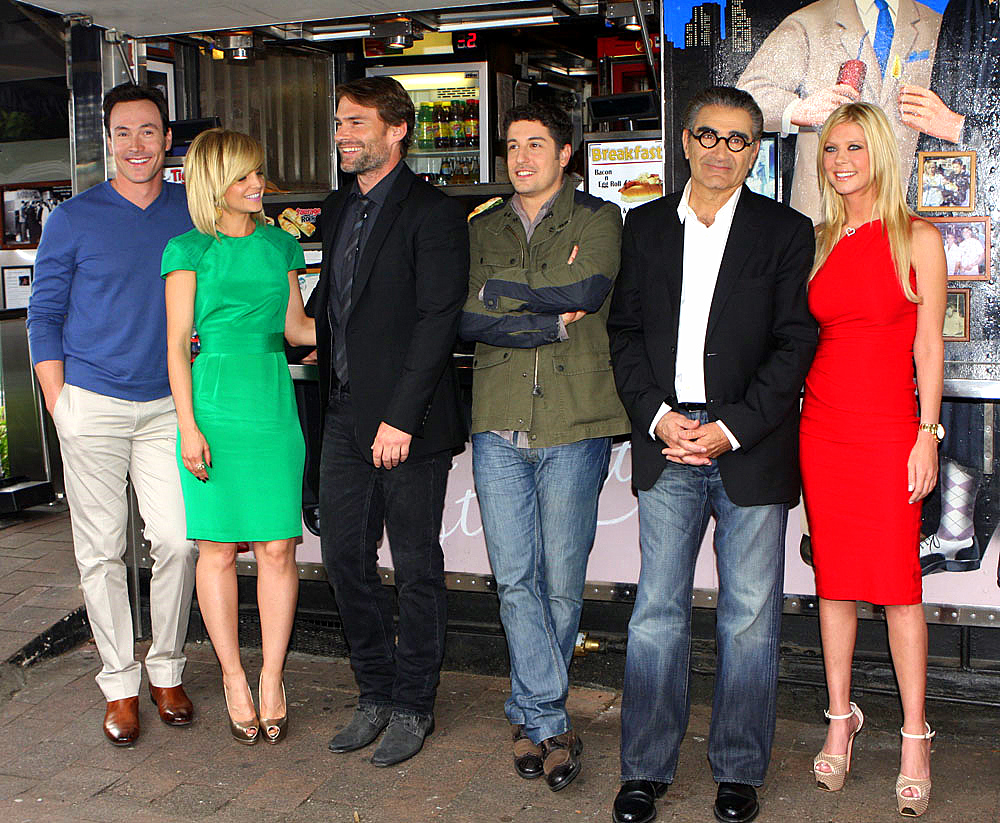
Characters from the series. From left to right: Chris "Oz" Ostreicher, Heather, Steve Stifler, James "Jim" Levenstein, Noah Levenstein and Vicky. Picture from 2012.

Characters from the series. From left to right: Vicky, Heather, Chris "Oz" Ostreicher, Michelle Flaherty, Steve Stifler, Kevin Myers, Paul Finch, Jessica, Noah Levenstein, James "Jim" Levenstein and Nadia. Picture from 2001.

This is a list of characters from the film series American Pie consisting of American Pie (1999), American Pie 2 (2001), American Wedding (2003), American Pie Presents: Band Camp (2005), American Pie Presents: The Naked Mile (2006), American Pie Presents: Beta House (2007), American Pie Presents: The Book of Love (2009), American Reunion (2012), and American Pie Presents: Girls' Rules (2020). Noah Levenstein, played by Eugene Levy, has appeared in eight of the nine released films. Biggs, Hannigan, Scott, Nicholas, Thomas, Coolidge, Cho, Isfield, Cheek, and Owen all play their characters in four films each; other characters appear in fewer films.

== Characters from American Pie ==
=== Noah Levenstein ===
Noah Levenstein
- American Pie character
- First appearance: American Pie (1999)
- Last appearance: American Reunion (2012)
- Created by: Adam Herz
- Portrayed by: Eugene Levy

In-universe information
- Family: Evan Levenstein (grandson); Michelle Flaherty (daughter-in-law)
- Significant others: Mrs. Levenstein (aka "Jim's Mom", deceased); Jeanine Stifler
- Children: Jim Levenstein

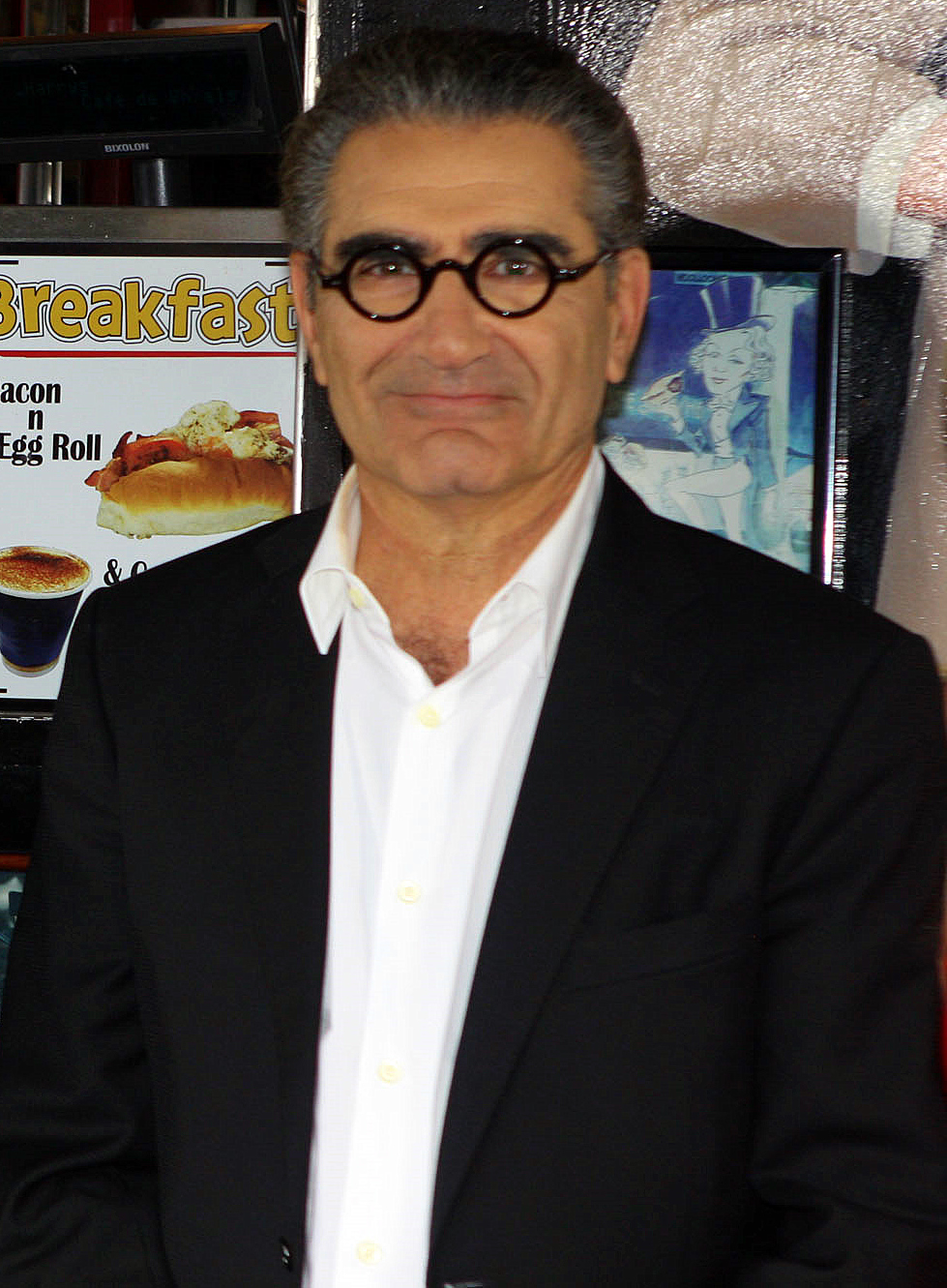
Levy has appeared in nearly all released films in the American Pie film series, with the exception of "American Pie Presents: Girl's Rules".

Noah Levenstein, also known as "Jim's Dad", has appeared in eight of the nine films to date, being absent only in American Pie Presents: Girl's Rules.

He first appears in American Pie where he attempts to offer sexual advice including purchasing and giving his son Jim pornography after finding him masturbating with a tube sock. He later finds Jim humping a pie after being previously told that third base feels like "warm apple pie". He later helps Jim cover the incident up and lies to his wife about the missing pie and where it has gone, telling her he and Jim ate it.

He reappears in the second film of the series where he takes Jim to the hospital after Jim decides to turn on a porn film that Stifler rented, but accidentally uses superglue instead of lubricant to masturbate, permanently glueing his entire hand to his penis and boxer shorts. He then supports Jim after he learns that he won't be able to have sex for at least a whole week, the same amount of time before the party he is attending with Nadia, with whom he plans on sleeping, will be held.

He appears in the third film, American Wedding (2003). In the third installment Noah arrives at the restaurant Jim is at to give him the engagement ring he was going to use to propose to girlfriend Michelle. Jim tries to hide the fact that he is being fellated. Not knowing Michelle is under the table, Jim's dad expresses his excitement at the proposal and inadvertently reveals Michelle and Jim's act.

In the first spin off film from the main series, American Pie Presents: Band Camp, he is revealed to be the camp's Morale and Conflict Resolution Officer (MACRO) as Michelle is pregnant and unable to take the role herself; he continues to act as a mentor character, recommending that Matt Stifler start trying to fit in and earn the band's trust rather than emulate his older brother.

He appears again in the fifth installment, in which he is presiding over the annual Naked Mile run.

He appears in the sixth film, in which he revealed to be Beta alumni and the last-winning team captain of the Greek Olympiad. He helps to host the competition, which includes competing to remove girls' bras the fastest, a light saber duel and catching a greased pig, with the final challenge being to hold off from ejaculation while receiving a lap dance. After the Betas win, Noah, as the officiate, hands over the golden hammer to Dwight.

In the seventh film, he plays a significantly smaller role, as he is not seen until near the end of the movie. He is revealed to have created "The Bible" (The Book of Love) while at college. After the book is destroyed, Rob, Nathan and Lube track him down to help recreate it, in which he assists them with and helps the group to recreate the manual.

American Reunion marks Noah's last appearance in the franchise and reveals that his wife (otherwise known simply as "Jim's Mom") has died three years prior to the events portrayed in the film, and that he is still grieving her loss. During his son's visit Noah enlists Jim and Michelle into helping him set up an online dating profile. In the end, however, he finds new love with Stifler's Mom after the two meet at her son's house party and hit it off.

=== James "Jim" Levenstein ===
Jim Levenstein
- American Pie character
- First appearance: American Pie (1999)
- Last appearance: American Reunion (2012)
- Created by: Adam Herz
- Portrayed by: Jason Biggs

In-universe information
- Family: Noah Levenstein (father)
- Spouse: Michelle Flaherty
- Children: Evan Levenstein (son)

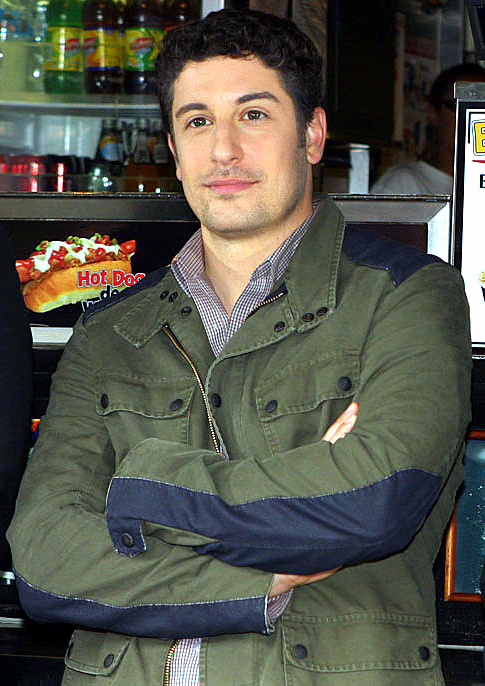
Jason Biggs, plays James "Jim" Levenstein

James Emmanuel "Jim" Levenstein is the main protagonist of the four primary films in the American Pie series. He is an awkward everyman who wants to lose his virginity. He first appears in American Pie, where he is trying to lose his virginity before the end of high school and begins to pursue Czech exchange student Nadia. Stifler persuades him to set up a webcam in his room so that they can all watch it together. The plan backfires, though, when Nadia discovers Jim's pornography collection and sits half-naked on his bed to read it. Jim is forced to return to his room, where he joins Nadia, unaware that he accidentally sent the weblink to the entire school directory. As Nadia is preparing to have sex with him, he prematurely ejaculates twice, humiliating himself live in front of the entire school. Shortly afterwards Nadia leaves school and goes back home, now leaving Jim completely dateless for prom and ruining his chances of securing a date. Out of panic, Jim asks band geek Michelle Flaherty to the senior prom as she is apparently the only girl at his school who did not see what happened. He succeeds in getting Michelle into bed where she behaves aggressively before leaving him to wake up alone. The film ends with Jim and his friends eating breakfast before toasting to the next step.

Jim reappears in American Pie 2 where he and his friends rent a house at Lake Michigan in the summer break at the end of their freshman year. After keeping in contact with Nadia, who is traveling across the US, Nadia agrees to join Jim at his beach party. When Jim decides to turn on a porn movie that Stifler rented, he accidentally uses superglue instead of lubricant to masturbate, permanently gluing his entire hand to his penis and boxer shorts. Shocked and frightened, he takes out the porn cassette but ends up bonding the cassette to his other hand. Unable to open any doors, he climbs out of a window and stumbles onto the rooftop where he is caught by police officers. He is supported at the hospital by his father Noah, where he learns the news that he won't be able to have sex for at least a whole week, the same amount of time before the party is due to occur. When Nadia turns up earlier than expected, Michelle acts as his fake girlfriend so that he won't have to have sex with Nadia until his penis has healed. At the party Jim has an epiphany and realizes that it isn't Nadia he loves but Michelle. Nadia is upset that Jim chose a geek over her, but is happy for Jim and allows him to go and find Michelle, performing at band camp. He gatecrashes the performance with a trombone, just like he did before, but with much more style and confidence, and romantically makes out with Michelle in front of the cheering crowd.

In American Wedding, Jim has somewhat less screen time in comparison to the first two films and Reunion. In the opening scene, he proposes to Michelle after a few problems in attempting. She enthusiastically agrees. Jim is worried about dancing at the wedding, but salvation comes in the form of Steve Stifler, who promises to teach Jim in return of a wedding invite. Jim reluctantly agrees much to the rest of the guests disappointment. Stifler also takes charge of the bachelor party but unfortunately collides the dates with the day Jim was supposedly setting up a dinner to impress Michelle's parents. Although it appears all is ruined, Stifler and Finch cover for Jim and thankfully get the Flaherty's blessing. Scared on the days building toward the wedding, Jim shaves his pubic hair in an attempt to impress Michelle even further. However, disaster strikes as his pubes inadvertently fall into the air conditioning covering their wedding cake. A new one is made and Jim encounters another embarrassing heart-heart with his father. On the day of the wedding, Jim announces his appreciation and love for his friends Paul Finch, Kevin Myers and Steve Stifler and then happily marries Michelle.

In Band Camp, Noah Levenstein informs Stifler's younger brother Matt of Michelle's pregnancy revealing that the character is to become a father. Jim is mentioned again as Noah attempts to comfort Matt, who was caught attempting to masturbate using an oboe, informing him that he caught his son engaging in sexual activity with a pie.

Naked Mile also alludes to Jim's paternity as Noah proudly informs Erik, Steve and Matt's younger cousin, that Michelle successfully gave birth.

Whilst absent from the film, The Book of Love shows Jim's signature in the East Great Falls Bible, referencing the events of the first film.

Jim returns in American Reunion, once again the protagonist, played by Jason Biggs. He and Michelle now have a 2-year-old son named Evan. The couple's sex life has been slowly deteriorating after the birth of their son. Throughout the film, they try to re-ignite their sexual flames. Also, Jim must avoid the advances of Kara, an 18-year-old girl he once babysat when she was young, who wants to lose her virginity to him. Seeing how her situation mirrors his own when he was her age in the original film, Jim teaches her that it is best if she waits for someone special.

=== Michelle Flaherty ===
Michelle Flaherty
- American Pie character
- First appearance: American Pie (1999)
- Last appearance: American Reunion (2012)
- Created by: Adam Herz
- Portrayed by: Alyson Hannigan

In-universe information
- Family: Noah Levenstein (father-in-law)
- Spouse: Jim Levenstein
- Children: Evan Levenstein (son)

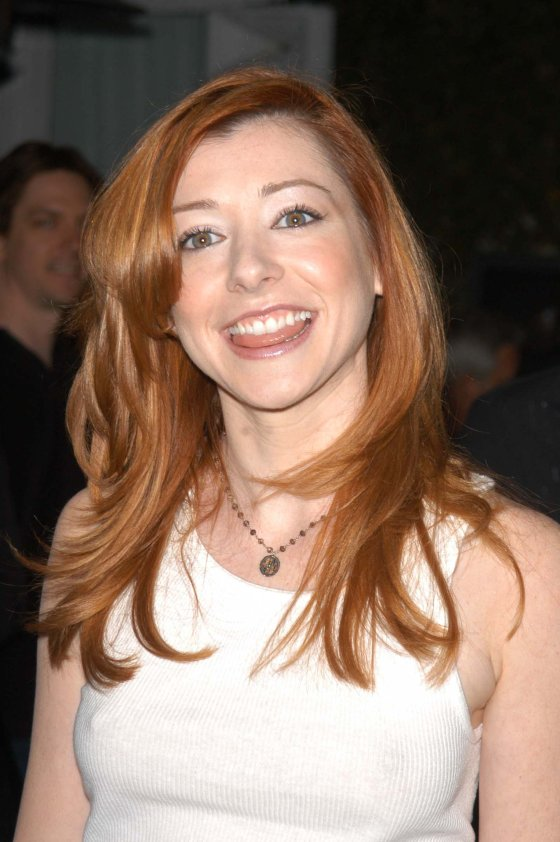
Alyson Hannigan

Michelle Annabeth Flaherty first appears in American Pie as a supporting character. Jim asks her to the prom as she pretends to be the only person in the school who has not seen the video of Jim prematurely ejaculating. After the prom, Jim loses his virginity to Michelle, who proves to be surprisingly aggressive in bed, and she later leaves him to wake up alone. He quickly gets over being upset as he is excited about being "used".

Michelle reappears in American Pie 2 in a much larger role. Here, her friendship with Jim grows over the summer and eventually she begins to fall in love with him. She explains that she didn't ditch Jim the morning after prom intentionally. It was done out of fear of rejection as she thought the date was over and was worried that Jim would have done the same to her. She later pretends to be Jim's girlfriend so he won't have to have sex with Nadia until his sore penis has healed. She stages a break up in front of Nadia who later goes to the party with Jim. However, Michelle is upset about Jim's interest in Nadia as opposed to her. Jim later realizes his love for Michelle, and decides to just be friends with Nadia. He goes to find Michelle at band camp, and gatecrashes the performance with a trombone and confidently kisses Michelle in front of a supportive crowd, therefore beginning a relationship with her.

In American Wedding, Michelle and Jim have continued dating and she accepts Jim's proposal of marriage at the beginning of the film. Michelle settles on a dress but it is only made by one particular dressmaker so Jim and his friends set out to find him for her. Michelle and Jim's plans are almost ruined when Stifler turns up to the engagement party although they had planned to not invite him. After several misadventures, including one with the flowers being killed which Stifler later fixes, Michelle and Jim marry.

Band Camp revealed that after the events of American Wedding, Michelle became an annual MACRO at Tall Oaks Band Camp. However, she could not attend in the 2005 semester as she was heavily pregnant with Jim's baby. She requested that Noah, Jim's father, take her place, a request he received with much pride. In Naked Mile, Noah informs Erik Stifler that she had in fact given birth to a baby, to which he announced was a happy occasion.

In American Reunion, it is revealed that Michelle and Jim do not have sex anymore, due to their parental responsibilities. Jim is watching porn on his computer when he is interrupted by Evan, and he accidentally throws a tube sock on him. He goes to the bathroom, where he discovers Michelle pleasuring herself in the bathtub with a shower head. The two speak about the incident on the way back to their hometown for their class reunion, and Michelle reveals she knows about Jim watching porn. They both agree to have plenty of sex over the weekend. The next morning, Jim is hungover and wakes up on the kitchen floor. Michelle and her old band camp friend, Selena, come in the kitchen to clean up the mess that Jim and his friends left the previous night, and Jim realizes he is not wearing anything below the torso. When Michelle asks Jim to hand her the paper towels, he must cover his genital area with pots and pans, but accidentally covers up with a clear pot lid, which embarrasses Michelle.

At the beach, Michelle is annoyed that Jim is obviously ogling Oz's model girlfriend, Mia. She tells Selena that she is worried that her and Jim's sex life isn't going well ever since she became a mother, but Selena convinces her to get past that obstacle. Jim tells Michelle that the guys wanted to go the falls, and Michelle volunteers to take care of Evan, promising him a night of sex when he comes home. However, Jim's escapades during the night result in him falling asleep almost immediately after he comes home, much to Michelle's dismay. Jim tells Michelle that he will make up for it by having sex with her at Stifler's house party. Sometime after they arrive, Michelle brings Jim into a spare bedroom and reveals she brought BDSM clothing for them to change into. When Michelle leaves, Jim awaits her return, but is greeted by Kara, who tries to rape him. When Jim is chased out of the house and attacked by Kara's boyfriend and his friends, Michelle walks out and whips one of them. Jim then attempts to explain the situation, angering both Kara and Michelle in the process; Michelle tells Jim she will stay at her grandmother's house. At the class reunion, Michelle shows up without telling Jim, and they both lightheartedly act like strangers before they go into the high school's band room and have sex on a desk. They are interrupted briefly by Nadia, Jim's past muse. The sex helps reconcile Jim and Michelle's relationship.

=== Steve Stifler ===
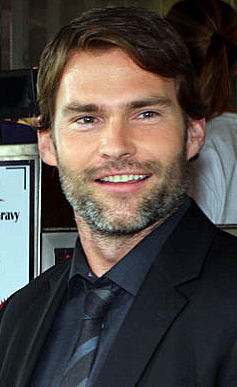
Seann William Scott

- Portrayed by Seann William Scott
- Appeared in: American Pie, American Pie 2, American Wedding, and American Reunion

Steven "Steve" Stifler, commonly referred by his last name Stifler or his nickname The Stifmeister, made his first appearance in American Pie, in which he went to East Great Falls High. He was involved with sports where he played football and lacrosse. While not part of the sex pact, Stifler plays a crucial role in the film in two ways: (1) his post-prom party served as the setting for the film's final act, and (2) he is also a close friend of the guys, especially fellow lacrosse player Chris "Oz" Ostreicher and Jim Levenstein. Despite his love-hate friendship with Paul Finch, it is apparent that they are still great friends. After Finch pays to have positive rumors about himself spread to all the girls in the school, one of these being that he won in a fist fight with Stifler, Stifler humiliates Finch in front of everyone by putting very strong laxative in Finch's habitual drink of mocha cappuccino. Finch, who is too uptight to use the school toilet until that time, then runs to the restroom, where Stifler helpfully holds the door open for him. It turns out to be the ladies' restroom, and Finch is publicly embarrassed. Stifler is also on the wrong end of the first of three particularly distasteful sight gags throughout the film's trilogy, where in this movie, he ingests beer containing semen. He then proceeds to vomit uncontrollably on a girl he was trying to seduce, and in the toilet. Stifler later catches his mother, Jeanine, and Finch having sex, and loses consciousness under the shock. This incident further ignites the frenemy relationship between Finch and Stifler.

Stifler's second appearance was in the sequel, American Pie 2 (2001), with a much larger role this time. After returning from his first year at Michigan State University with Oz, Stifler attempts a reunion party at his home, which is shut down thanks to the neighbors calling the police. He helps chip in cash to rent a beach house on Lake Michigan with the rest of the group. During the summer, Stifler becomes interested in two owners of a neighboring house that they were hired to paint: two women whom Stifler mistakenly regards as lesbians. As Stifler, Jim, and Finch sneak into their room, they respond to Stifler's attraction by offering to engage in varying degrees of lesbian sexual activities in front of Stifler, Jim and Finch, but only in exchange for the guys to engage in a corresponding degree of homoerotic acts that the girls enjoy watching. The first is Stifler grabbing Finch's buttocks, the second is Stifler and Jim french kissing, and the third one would have been for Stifler to receive a hand job from either Finch or Jim, which Stifler is the only one confident enough to do. However this freaks out Jim and Finch too much and they run off. This annoys Stifler, as the more the guys would have done, the more the girls would have done. At the main party at the beach house at the end of the film, the two girls arrive, telling Stifler they never said they were lesbians, and Stifler ends up in bed with them both.

In American Wedding, Stifler is the main antagonist. He is revealed to have become a high school football assistant coach; he also drives the team's bus. He drops in on Jim and Michelle's engagement party, much to their dismay. He is also implicated in an unusual Jim-plus-two-dogs foursome. He competes with Finch for the heart of Cadence, Michelle's younger sister. He impersonates Finch's refined and polite personality in order to win Cadence over, but Finch continues the triangle by replicating Stifler's outrageous frat boy image, which Cadence surprisingly enjoys just as much, if not more. Nevertheless, Stifler manages to bond with Cadence's family, and is eventually charged with holding Michelle's wedding ring. However, the family dog manages to ingest the ring while it is in Stifler's care, and Stifler follows it until it defecates. Stifler picks up the ring which is encapsulated within the feces using a confection paper, which Cadence's mother sees and assumes it to be one of the truffles. She insists that Stifler let her have it, but knowing he could blow his chances with Cadence for good, he suddenly devours the dog dropping into his own mouth. This carries on the tradition of rather distasteful gags where Stifler ingests various bodily substances once in each movie. Before the wedding, Stifler accidentally destroys the massive flower arrangement Michelle's family had ordered, resulting in everyone turning against him. Jim tells him to leave, and seeing how no one is on his side, Stifler complies. However, Stifler redeems himself at the end of the film: using the football team as his minions, Stifler uses his own money to buy up the entire content of a nearby flower shop and has the football team successfully set up the flowers for the wedding hours before it is to occur. By doing this, Cadence eventually falls for him and invites him to have sex in the closet. Upon following this invitation, Stifler accidentally has sex with Jim's grandmother, who was put there by John and Justin because she was "being a bitch". When Finch and Kevin go to collect her from the closet, they catch Stifler having sex with Jim's grandmother. Horrified by this, Stifler asks them to close the door and screams out. At the wedding, Finch taunts Stifler by whispering "grandmother fucker". Stifler retorts with "Well, you're a mother fucker", to which Finch agrees "Yes. yes I am." At the reception, Stifler dances with Cadence and congratulates his friend, Jim.

In Band Camp, the audience are told that Stifler has become a pornographic movie director. This movie shows that although the jocks and other popular kids pretended to like Stifler he was not liked by anyone in high school, which led Matt to reform his ways. In The Naked Mile, he is mentioned in passing by his cousin Erik as one of the legendary Stifler boys. A picture of him can be seen on Erik's noticeboard.

In American Reunion, he is portrayed in a slightly lighter fashion and can be considered somewhat of a tragic character. He now works as a temp at an investment firm, having to put up with humiliating verbal abuse from his cold-hearted employer. He yearns for the days of his youth and has trouble coping with the fact that things will never be the way they were before. Throughout the film, he attempts to re-create his teenage years (such as seeking revenge on a group of mean-spirited teens and throwing one of his trademark parties) but fails each time as his friends and everyone else have outgrown this. When Stifler learns Finch was arrested for stealing his boss' motorcycle, he finds it hilarious and believed he got his revenge on Finch because he slept with Jeanine (Stifler's mom) in the past. Meanwhile, Jim, Oz and Kevin are angered by Stifler's lack of tolerance towards their friend and rally to Finch's side. During a heated argument with the guys, Jim, Oz and Kevin reveal they don't like having Stiffer around because he always ruins their plans. Stifler is devastated and decides to skip the reunion. However, the guys soon realize how much they mean to Stifler, and how much he means to them, so they locate him at work and make amends with him. He regains his confidence and quits his job (but not before standing up to his boss). The guys proceed to attend the reunion, finally embracing Stifler as one of their own. Stifler catches up with Chuck "Sherminator" Sherman, and feeling regretful for how he treated him in high school, Stifler wholeheartedly helps Sherman find a woman to score with. In a surprise turn of events, he meets Finch's gorgeous mother and finally has his revenge by having sex with her on the lacrosse field as the MILF Guys, John and Justin, happily watch. In the end, the five friends all promise to stay in touch and meet up at least once a year from now on to catch up.

=== Kevin Meyers ===
- Portrayed by Thomas Ian Nicholas
- Appeared in: American Pie, American Pie 2, American Wedding, and American Reunion

Kevin Meyers first appears in American Pie as the suave leader of the pack, and he is the friend of Jim Levenstein, Chris "Oz" Ostreicher, Paul Finch, and Steve Stifler, and the boyfriend of Vicky. The four friends make a pact to lose their virginity before they graduate from high school. Vicky later accuses Kevin of being with her only for sex, and he must try to repair his relationship with her before the upcoming prom night, when the four plan to lose their virginity. He eventually succeeds. At the prom, everything seems hopeless for the four boys until Vicky asks the girl that Chuck Sherman claimed to have bedded about her first time. She proclaims to everyone at the prom that she and Sherman did not have sex at Stifler's party, leaving Sherman humiliated and making him wet himself. The revelation takes the pressure off of Jim, Kevin, Oz and Finch, and they head to the post-prom party with new hope. At the after-party at Stifler's house, all four boys fulfill their pledge. Kevin and Vicky have sex in an upstairs bedroom. Vicky breaks up with Kevin afterwards on the grounds that they will drift apart when they go to college, with him attending the University of Michigan and her at Cornell University. The morning after the prom Jim, Kevin, Oz, and Finch eat breakfast at their favorite restaurant where they toast to the future.

Kevin reappears in American Pie 2 where he, Jim, Oz and Finch return to their hometown in East Great Falls, Michigan, for the summer break after their first year of college. They attend a party hosted by Stifler, but not only does their new status as college students not give them any success with local girls, but the police also shut down the party. Kevin also has problems when he meets Vicky after their year away from each other; Vicky wants to be friends and Kevin is love-sick for her, but worried he will lose her completely. Desperately he calls his brother for advice, who tells him to move down to the beach and party hard. Together, they set off for a rented house by the beach in Grand Harbor, Michigan, where they intend to spend the whole summer, but Kevin is forced to invite Stifler along as well in order to successfully cover the costs. Kevin finds the boys jobs working as painters and decorators for a nearby house. The boys then plan to throw a huge summer party at the house, bigger than anything they've done before. The party begins at the beach house. Kevin sees his ex-girlfriend Vicky but is devastated when he sees her with a new boyfriend and leaves to go to the beach by himself. Oz, Finch and Jim follow him down, where he admits to them that he never got over Vicky and that with the party, he was hoping to relive his senior year prom night, in particular, sleeping with Vicky at the end of it. The others help Kevin realize that it will never happen, and the quartet return to the beach house to party hard.

In the third film, he reappears in a much smaller role with little significance to the plot, in contrast to the first two and latter films. Early on in the film, he mentions that he is attending law school, and persuades Finch to join him. As a groomsman, he aids Jim in finding the wedding dress Michelle finally settles on after long hours of searching, which is made by only one designer, Leslie Summers, working for one store. Jim, Kevin and Finch, with Stifler tagging along, set out to find the dressmaker. They go to Chicago looking for her and end up in a gay bar. Stifler has a dance-off with a man nicknamed "Bear," who knows Summers. This prompts her to offer to make Michelle's dress, and Summers also hits on Kevin. At a bachelor party in Jim's house arranged by Stifler (without Jim's knowledge), Kevin brings a giant case of beer. He is later seduced by strippers that Stifler arranged to appear at the party, where he mentions that he has a girlfriend. The strippers tie up Kevin and shove him in a closet once, unbeknownst to everyone in the house, Jim shows up with Michelle's parents. When Michelle's mother looks in the closet for Pine-Sol, she finds Kevin and freaks out. Stifler later uses the excuse that Jim arranged for Kevin to be tied up so he could "save him" and look like a hero to Michelle's parents. The day before the wedding, Jim confides in Kevin and Finch about worrying about his future, and Kevin consoles him by saying that he always finds his way out of tough situations. This helps Jim realize that he will be okay in life, and he tells this to Kevin during a groomsmen meeting. Later on, Kevin and Finch go to check on Jim's grandma, who was hidden away in a random closet. They find Stifler having intercourse with Jim's grandma, and leave horrified.

It is noted on the DVD commentary that most of Kevin's scenes were cut from the final edit, which implies he played a more relevant role than the one shown in the final cut.

In American Reunion, Kevin has lost contact with all his former friends; apart from Jim. The two have a conversation about going to the reunion, with Kevin being very excited. He is working as an architect from home, and is married to a woman named Ellie. His life now consists of watching several reality shows, such as Real Housewives and Desperate Housewives. Kevin and the others meet at a bar, where they browse through the yearbook and find Kevin's quote, "Kevin Meyers hopes to still be living it up with the beautiful Vicky Latham." The next day, they all go to the beach, and Kevin and Vicky run into each other. They're still friends, and there appears to be no romantic feelings between the two of them. They go to the falls and chat to each other, getting drunk. The next morning, Kevin wakes up beside Vicky, wearing nothing but his underwear. He worries and leaves, thinking the two of them engaged in sexual intercourse. At Stifler's party, Kevin rings his wife, but Vicky enters the room. He confronts Vicky, but she says they didn't have sex and that she took his clothes off because he fell in the lake. She is angry at Kevin that he would have such low expectations about her. He fights outside against A.J. and his friend, and puts up a decent fight. When Finch is taken by the police, Kevin passionately tries to stop them by saying Finch didn't steal the motorcycle. Kevin and Vicky reconcile at the reunion, and the two of them and Ellie dance together. He is last seen at Dog Years with the others, and they all agree to meet up at least once a year from now on.

=== Paul Finch ===
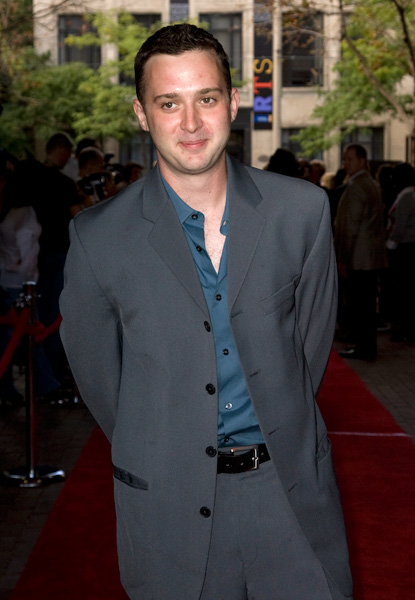
Eddie Kaye Thomas

- Portrayed by Eddie Kaye Thomas
- Appeared in: American Pie, American Pie 2, American Wedding, and American Reunion

Paul Finch, commonly referred by his surname Finch, first appears in American Pie as a mochaccino-drinking sophisticate and he is the friend of Jim Levenstein, Kevin Meyers and Chris "Oz" Ostreicher. He is a member of the nerdy four friends make a pact to lose their virginity before they graduate from high school. Finch, meanwhile, pays Vicky's friend Jessica $200 to spread rumors around the school of his sexual prowess, hoping that it will increase his chances of success. Unfortunately, he runs into trouble when Stifler, angry that a girl turned him down for the prom because she was waiting for Finch to ask her, puts a laxative into Finch's mochacchino. Finch, being paranoid about the lack of cleanliness in the school restrooms, and unable to go home to use the toilet as he usually does, is tricked by Stifler into using the girls' restroom. Afterward, he emerges before many other fellow students, humiliated and is left dateless. At the prom, everything seems hopeless for the four boys until Vicky asks the girl that Chuck Sherman claimed to have bedded about her first time. She proclaims to everyone at the prom that she and Sherman did not have sex at Stifler's party, leaving Sherman embarrassed and making him wet himself. The revelation takes the pressure off of Jim, Kevin, Oz and Finch, and they head to the post-prom party with new hope. At the after-party at Stifler's house, all four boys fulfill their pledge. Finch strays downstairs to the basement recreation room where he meets Stifler's mother, Jeanine. She is aroused by his precociousness, and they have sex on the pool table. In the morning Stifler enters the room, realizes that his mom has had sex with Finch and faints, unable to believe that his mom and "shitbreak" are together. The morning after the prom Jim, Kevin, Oz, and Finch eat breakfast at their favorite restaurant where they toast to the future.

Paul reappears in American Pie 2, where he, Jim, Kevin, Oz, and Stifler return to their hometown in East Great Falls, Michigan for the summer break after their first year of college. They attend a party hosted by Stifler, but not only does their new status as college students not give them any success with local girls, but the police also shut down the party. After arriving in Grand Harbor, Kevin finds them work as painters and decorators for a house nearby. Stifler is intrigued by the two female owners, who appear to be lesbians, and excitedly breaks into their house while they're away. Jim and Finch follow him, trying to get him out, but they are caught by the owners, who relent on calling the police. But after Stifler identifies his interest in their homosexuality, they insist on the boys performing "like for like" homosexual acts on each other in return for being able to watch the girls do the same thing. Oz and Kevin take turns watching up a ladder and listening on the walkie-talkie also in the room. The conversation is accidentally picked up and heard by many other people in the neighborhood. After this, the boys plan to throw a huge summer party at the house, bigger than anything they've done before. Finch has become involved in the sexual art of Tantra, and claims that through Tantric sex, he can "make an orgasm last for days". He is waiting patiently for Jeanine, hoping she will show up and be willing to have sex with him again. He thinks she arrives when a vehicle turns up after Stifler is talking on the phone, but it turns out to be Stifler's little brother Matt. Finally, the party begins at the beach house. Kevin sees his ex-girlfriend Vicky but is crushed when he sees her with a new boyfriend and leaves to go to the beach by himself. Oz, Finch and Jim follow him down, where he confides in them that he never got over Vicky and that with the party, he was hoping to relive his senior year prom night, in particular, sleeping with Vicky at the end of it. The others help Kevin realize that it will never happen, and the quartet return to the beach house to party hard. The morning after the party, a Mercedes coupe with darkened windows turns up at the house. Finch approaches to see Jeanine who has finally turned up. It doesn't take long before Finch gets into the car and drives off to the lakeside to have hard sex with her.

In the third film, Finch plays a larger role. He helps Jim find the wedding dress Michelle finally settles on after long hours of searching which is made by only one designer working for one store, so Jim, Kevin and Finch, with Stifler tagging along sets out to find the dressmaker for her. They go to Chicago looking for her and end up in a gay bar. Stifler has a dance-off to make up for his rudeness towards a man, Bear, who knows the dressmaker. In the meantime Stifler arranges a bachelor party for everyone at Jim's house except Jim who unknowingly has arranged a "special dinner" for Michelle's parents before the wedding. Kevin, Jim and Stifler are then introduced to Fraulein Brandi and Officer Krystal by Bear and then play submissive and dominant roles with them respectively. While this is going on, Jim enters the house and Michelle's parents are badly embarrassed. Michelle's sister Cadence attends the wedding, and Finch is quickly attracted to her. Stifler also becomes attracted to her. Upon hearing that Cadence is hoping to attract a decent guy, Stifler adopts a more meek attitude and acts like Finch, and avoids swearing and speaks of philosophy. But when Finch realizes that Cadence is beginning to tire of the intellectual Stifler, Finch acts immature, rude, and perverted: in other words, like Stifler. Stifler unintentionally kills the flowers the night before the wedding, and when arguing with Finch he is heard by Cadence, who realizes his true intentions. Later, Stifler realizes that he actually feels bad about his previous actions, prompting him to bring in the football team he coaches to set up the entire room with new flowers. Ultimately, Cadence chooses Stifler, and Finch admits that Stifler was probably better for her anyway. Due to a confusion, Stifler has sex with Jim's grandmother, who opposed the wedding but is so happily distracted by this to no longer argue. Michelle and Jim eventually get married. At the reception, Finch is sitting by himself when Stifler's mom arrives. They tell each other they are over each other but at the end of the movie it shows Stifler's mom and Finch in the tub having sex. The two MILF guys are watching in awe through the window as Finch goes under the bubbles to perform oral sex on her.

In American Reunion, Finch is an assistant manager at Staples but is often disrespected by his boss. Having had enough, he "borrows" his boss's motorcycle when he does not receive a raise that was promised to him and takes it out for a joy ride. Finch is arrested for the whole thing when the cops show up. Stifler finds the whole thing funny and believes he has gotten his revenge on him for having sex with his mother. Disgusted with his antagonistic attitude, Jim, Oz and Kevin rally to Finch's side and tell Stifler off. He meets and falls in love with Selena when he sees they have a lot in common. Finch makes amends with Selena for lying, and they have sex in the bathroom, which promises to lead to an ongoing relationship; in the process, Finch realizes that he has moved on from Stifler's mom. He decided to go see the world with Selena. Before leaving, Finch learns that Stifler had sex with his mom, Rachel, and feels a similar disgust towards his behavior (akin to the previous times he had sex with Jeanine).

=== Chris "Oz" Ostreicher ===
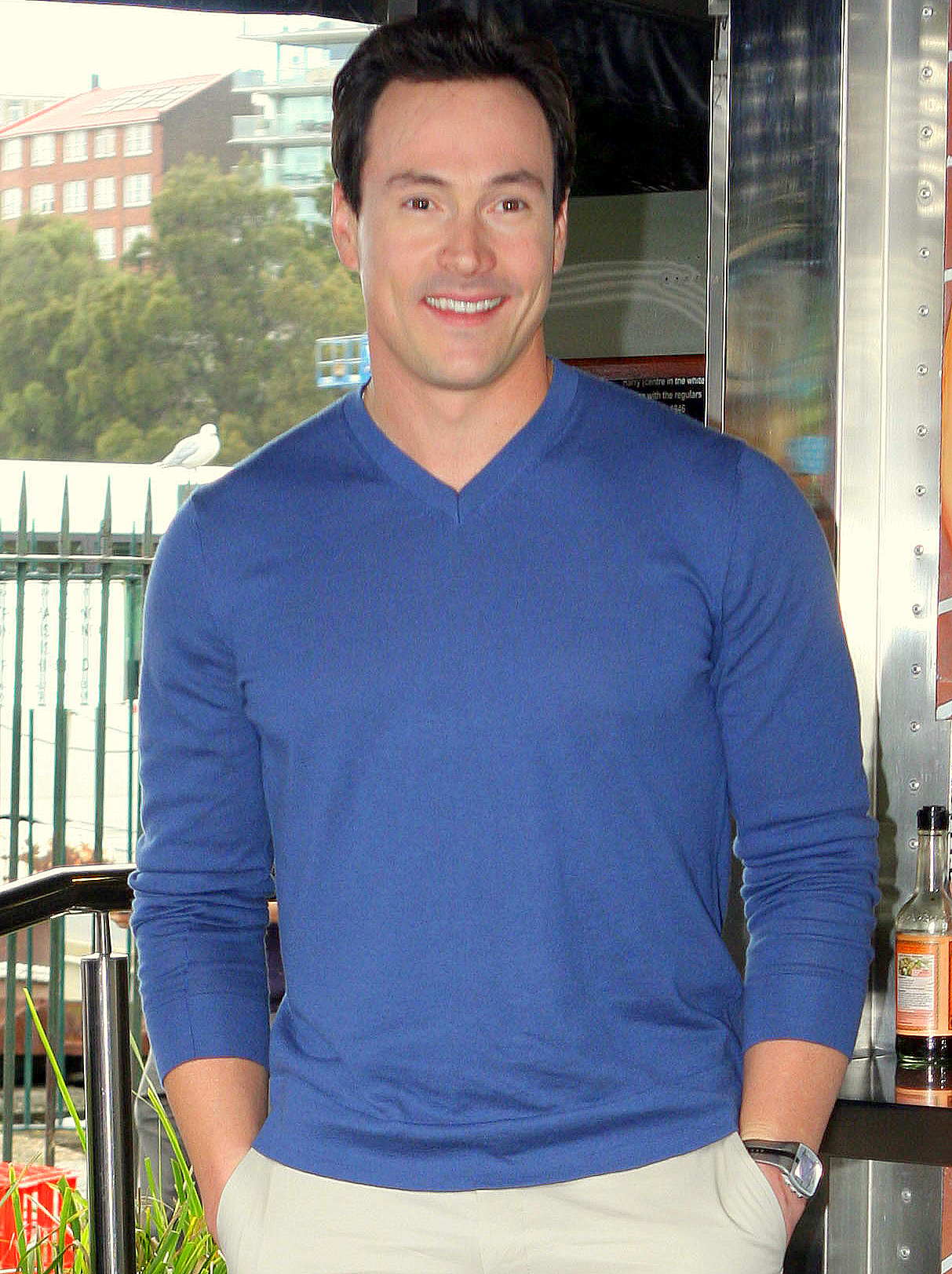
Chris Klein

- Portrayed by Chris Klein
- Appeared in: American Pie, American Pie 2, and American Reunion

Christopher Russell "Oz" Ostreicher first appears in American Pie as a member of the high school lacrosse team and as a friend of Jim Levenstein, Kevin Meyers, Steve Stifler, and Paul Finch. The nerdy and geeky four friends make a pact to lose their virginity before they graduate from high school. Oz joins the jazz choir in an effort to lose his reputation as an insensitive jock and find a girlfriend there. He soon wins the attention of Heather, a girl in the choir. However, he runs into problems when Heather comes to learn about Oz's reputation and subsequently breaks up with him, although he later manages to regain some of her trust. Heather sees the real Oz, not just some arrogant jock that people labeled as and see his real friends. Oz confesses the pact to Heather, and renounces it, saying that just by them being together makes him a winner. They reconcile and wind up making love together on the porch. Oz, honoring his newfound sensitivity, never confesses to what they did. The morning after the prom Jim, Kevin, Oz, and Finch eat breakfast at their favourite restaurant where they toast to the future.

In American Pie 2 he reappears where he and his friends rent a house at Lake Michigan in the summer break at the end of their freshman year where they plan to have a party. Oz is lonely and missing his girlfriend Heather who is away in Spain. They start having erotic phone sex to vent some of their frustration, but keep getting interrupted by various people. Stifler kept annoyingly assume she might be having sex with other guys while she is in Spain and suggests that he should get laid with other girls but he refused to be unfaithful towards Heather. However, Oz briefly showed some unfaithfulness when he and Kevin attempted to peek on the two girls performing sexual acts on each other at the house they were working as their summer jobs. Heather turns up to Oz's delight later at the party.

He does not reappear in the third film, American Wedding, although he would have been highly likely to attend Jim and Michelle's wedding, since he was one of the five original boys. His absence is not explained in the released cut of the film, but in a deleted scene, it is mentioned that he and Heather are in Spain. The natural assumption is then that Oz and Heather could not fly back in time for the wedding, since Jim decided to have it as soon as possible to accommodate Jim's grandmother.

Like the majority of the other characters (excluding Jim's Dad, Matt Stifler, and The Sherminator), Oz does not appear in any of the spin-off films, but his name can be seen on the check-out card for "The Bible" in The Book of Love.

He is re-introduced into the series in American Reunion. He is now a successful, wealthy sportscaster, but is best known for his embarrassing loss to Gilbert Gottfried on Celebrity Dance-Off. Despite his fame and fortune, he is still not truly happy, as he and Heather are no longer together, since she broke up with him before heading to medical school, and he has yet to have a family of his own. He is dating a girl named Mia, who is best described as a "LA party girl" but he does not approve of her personality. He shows up for the reunion with the gang, and upon seeing Jim again, he acknowledges he may have missed his wedding but he'd never miss the reunion (alluding to his absence in the previous film). In the meantime, he tries to rekindle his relationship with Heather, who is dating an arrogant heart surgeon name Ron (who some people call Dr. Ron or "Dron"). After Ron embarrasses him by showing the video of him losing to Gilbert Gottfried to everyone during Stifler's party, he eventually tells Heather how he still feels about her and they share a kiss. They officially got back together at their high school reunion.

=== Victoria "Vicky" Latham ===
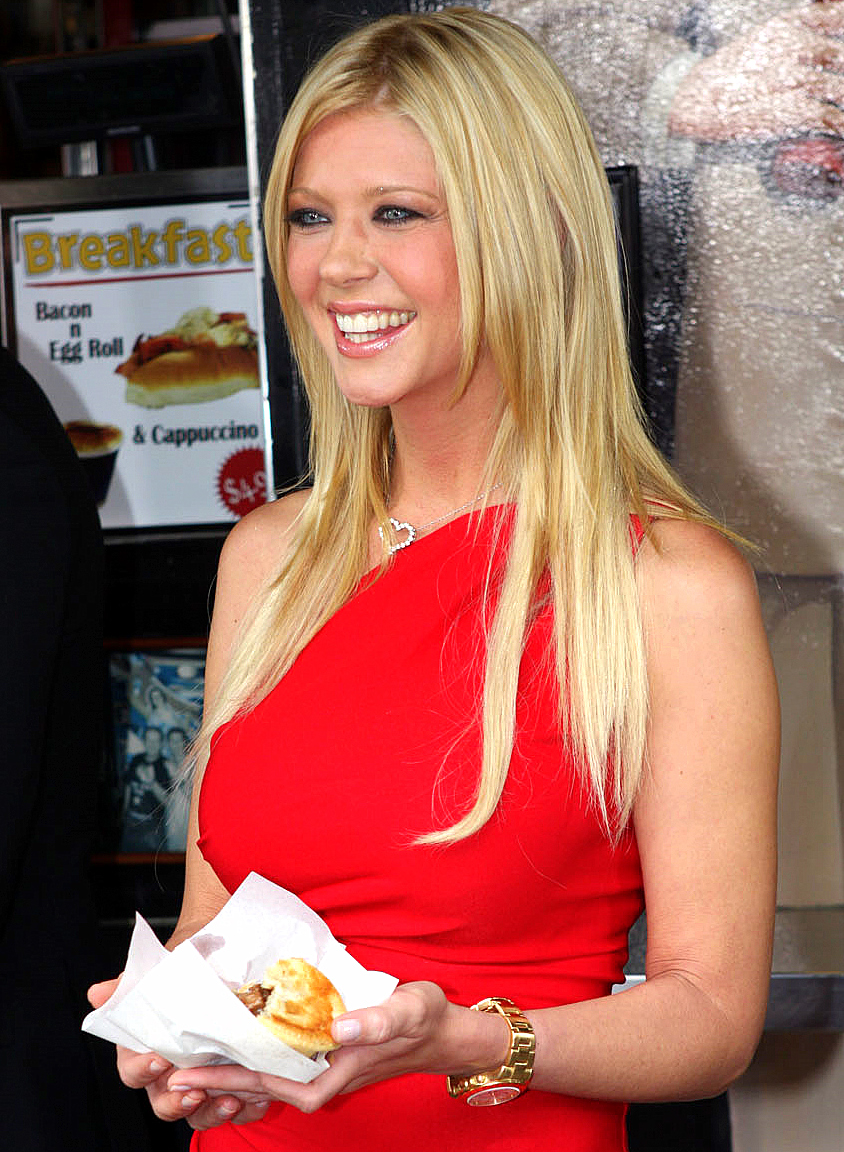
Tara Reid

- Portrayed by Tara Reid
- Appeared in: American Pie, American Pie 2, and American Reunion

Vicky first appears in American Pie, where she is Kevin Meyers's girlfriend. Despite dating since their senior homecoming, Vicky and Kevin have not yet had sex, a major looming point in their relationship. Kevin and Vicky are also going to two different colleges that are hundreds of miles apart, another obstacle. Kevin believes that he and Vicky will finally have sex at one of Stifler's parties, but she instead gives him a blowjob, and he ejaculates into a cup of beer that Stifler drinks. Vicky overhears Kevin telling Jim his dismay that he hasn't had sex yet, and she responds by leaving the party with her friend, Jessica. A few days after the party, Vicky is still mad at Kevin, having ignored flowers he sent to her house. He promises to make it up to her, and later on goes to her house and performs oral sex on her. When Kevin is over at Vicky's house, she expresses that she wants to take the next step in their relationship. Thinking that Vicky wants to have sex, Kevin is disappointed when she asks him to say "I love you." Vicky gets upset initially, but calms down. At school, Jessica convinces Vicky to finally have sex with Kevin. She tells Kevin in class that she wants to have sex at Stifler's after-prom party. At prom, she asks Chuck Sherman's date about how they had sex, which prompts Sherman's date to announce to everyone at prom that Sherman lied about having sex with her. At Stifler's after-prom party, Kevin and Vicky are briefly interrupted by Stifler's younger brother before finally having sex in a spare bedroom, where they tell each other "I love you." The morning after they have sex, Vicky breaks up with Kevin due to the distance of the colleges they are attending.

In American Pie 2, Vicky appears at Stifler's party on the first day of summer. Kevin walks over to talk to her, but they share an awkward moment after Kevin goes in for a kiss. They agree to remain friends. Vicky appears at the five boys' lake house when they host one of their many parties, where she tells Oz and Kevin, while they're playing pool, that she had sex with only one guy whilst in college. Kevin lies to Vicky and said he had sex with three girls at college. Jessica explains to Vicky that Kevin is lying about his body count, and references the "rule of three" (fake body count divided by three equals real body count). She is confused as to why Kevin would lie to her, but Jessica explains that he didn't lie, but he just followed the rule. Over the summer, Kevin and Vicky continue to hang out and re-connect. At the last lake house party of the summer, Kevin goes to talk to Vicky, but is interrupted by another guy, which angers Kevin. Vicky explains that the guy is her date, which causes Kevin to storm out of the house. After Jim, Oz, and Finch convince Kevin to return to the party, he goes over to Vicky and apologizes to her date. Vicky pulls Kevin aside and tells him that he doesn't need to apologize for anything, to which he states that he wants to still be friends with Vicky, and they dance.

Vicky is absent from the third film in the series, American Wedding.

In American Reunion, Vicky is in town for the class reunion and meets the guys at the lake. She is staying with her parents in town. When the group goes down to the falls the next night, Kevin and Vicky lightheartedly accuse each other of stalking their Facebook profiles, where Vicky reveals that she has broken up with her boyfriend, Alessandro. Kevin wakes up the next morning in a bed next to Vicky; both of their clothes are off. Thinking they had sex, Kevin panics and leaves before Vicky wakes up. At Stifler's house party, Kevin confides in his friends that he feels guilty for whatever happened with Vicky. He calls his wife in a spare bedroom, but Vicky excitedly barges in to greet Kevin. When Kevin confronts her about their alleged sexual intercourse, Vicky is extremely upset and explains that Kevin was drunk and fell in the lake, so she helped him dry off and get into bed. She storms out of the room, with Kevin trying to stop her. At the class reunion, Jessica tells Kevin to talk to Vicky, who is sitting at a table by herself. He walks over and apologizes for accusing her, and states he felt more guilty than anything because of their romantic past. Kevin says that while he loves his wife, Vicky will always be his first love, and she tells him the same. Kevin then introduces his wife to Vicky, and they all share a dance.

=== Heather ===
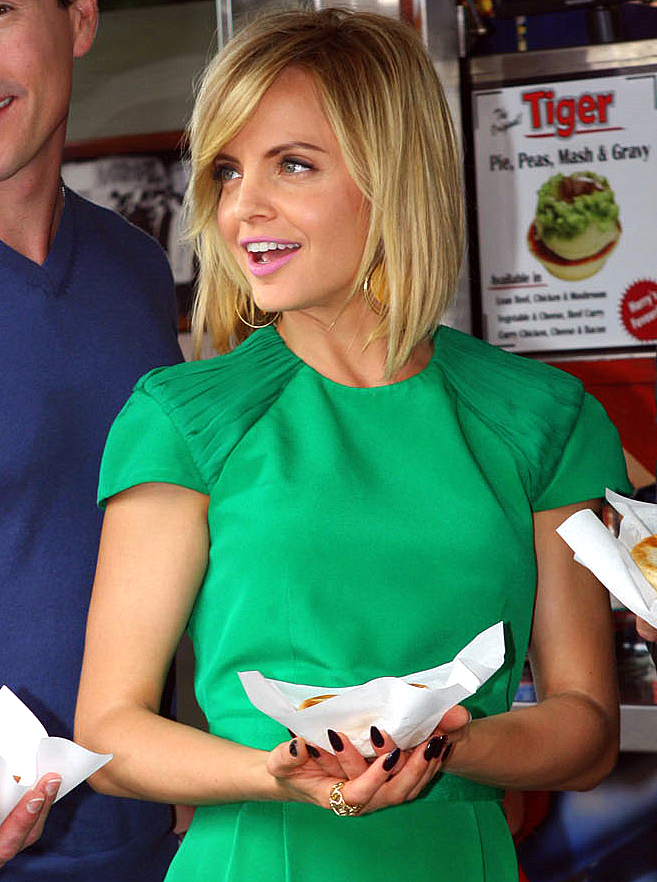
Mena Suvari

- Portrayed by Mena Suvari
- Appeared in: American Pie, American Pie 2, and American Reunion

Heather first appears in American Pie, where she is a member of the school show choir. Due to the guys' pact, Oz joins the choir in an attempt to find a girl to have sex with, and he lands his eye on Heather. When Heather's friends make fun of Oz behind his back, she defends him by stating that they don't really know him. After Oz has an awkward singing moment during a choir practice, Heather chats with Oz about people not knowing their actual personalities. Heather attends one of Oz's lacrosse games and asks him after the game if he wants to go to prom with her, to which he accepts. When she is walking away, Heather sees Oz's lacrosse teammates cheering him on and making misogynistic gestures, which makes her upset. When Heather shows up on the next school day, Oz compliments her car, but she is upset about the prom ordeal and takes back her invitation. During a choir practice, Heather's mood affects her performance, and the teacher suggests turning her solo piece into a duet. Oz promptly volunteers to be part of the duet, and Heather confronts him after practice, telling him he has to put in effort for the duet. Later on, at school, she sees Oz practicing alone in the choir room, which makes her happy. After asking Stifler where to find Oz, Heather shows up at the sub shop where Oz works, and they discuss about their future colleges being close to each other. When Oz realizes he has his season finale lacrosse game on the same day of the duet, he is dismayed and tells Heather, who tells him he should do what makes him happy. At the lacrosse game, Oz realizes he wants to be with Heather and leaves during halftime to go perform the duet with her. When he arrives, Heather is surprised but overjoyed, and they share a kiss. While walking to Stifler's after-prom party, Oz reveals the pact to Heather, but tells her he does not care about whether they have sex or not. They kiss and go to the loading dock, where they (supposedly) have sex, although Oz doesn't tell her friends the verdict.

In American Pie 2, Oz picks up Heather from college. However, she is upset that she is attending a summer program in Europe, which means she will be away from Oz for the majority of the summer. Oz drops her off at the airport and says goodbye to her. While abroad, Heather attempts to have phone sex with Oz, but they are interrupted by Stifler, and they agree to try it another time. A few weeks later, they attempt to have phone sex again, but Heather's roommates return to their shared apartment, and they deem it a lost cause. At the guys' last lake house party of the summer, Heather surprises Oz by appearing a few hours early. They dance together and later have sex.

While absent from American Wedding, she appears in American Reunion, where she has a slightly larger role. She is in town for the class reunion and meets Oz at the beach, where she introduces him to her new cardiologist boyfriend, Ron. Stifler comes over and makes a reference to Oz and Heather's previous sexual relationship, which turns the interaction awkward and cuts it short. At the falls, Heather, Ron, Oz, and his new girlfriend Mia all play the drinking game "never have I ever," where Mia reveals her sexually adventurous lifestyle. Ron later pulls Oz aside and suggests they swap girlfriends, stating it is somewhat okay because of Oz and Heather's past, before he brushes it off as a joke. The next morning, Oz and Heather catch up at a restaurant, where they flirt with each other before Oz is interrupted by fans who ask for a picture. At Stifler's house party, Ron reveals he obtained a VHS of Oz's embarrassing Celebrity Dance-Off loss and plays it for the party guests to see. Humiliated, Oz goes downstairs to grab a beer, and Heather follows him. She tries to comfort Oz, who then pulls her in for a kiss. Ron calls for Heather, and she tells Oz she will be right back. While she is gone, Mia, who earlier indulged two pills of ecstasy, finds Oz downstairs and starts to sexually assault him. When Heather comes back downstairs, Oz is surprised, which leads to Mia accusing him of cheating on her with Heather. Heather gets angry at Mia and rips out her hair extension; Heather then runs upstairs, upset. At the class reunion, Oz reconciles with Heather and tells her that he has broken up with Mia. He tells Heather that he wants to be with her, and they tell each other "I love you." Ron, who is flirting with other women by telling them a heroic story of his, spots Heather and Oz kissing and confronts Oz, threatening to sue him if Oz touches him. Stifler then sucker punches Ron, and Heather dances with Oz. The next day, Oz tells the guys that he is going to stay in town for a while with Heather.

=== Jessica ===
- Portrayed by Natasha Lyonne
- Appeared in: American Pie, American Pie 2, and American Reunion

Jessica is a friend of Vicky, Finch and Kevin, and usually gives them advice on what some high school "codes" mean such as for example, she tells Vicky that when a man says they slept with two or more girls she says it means they slept with one or none in reality, humorously Stifler says the opposite to his friends in that he says that it equals more, not less.

In American Pie, Jessica is introduced as Vicky's best friend, whom she confides in frequently. Jessica is presented as a more sexually experienced character compared to the other members of the film's main ensemble cast. When Kevin angers Vicky at Stifler's party, Jessica gives her a ride home. At school, Kevin seeks Jessica's help on how to win Vicky back, and she suggests that he perform oral sex on her. She also reveals that she was duped by a guy who told her he loved her so he could have sex with her. When Finch receives a sudden reputation on campus, Kevin asks Jessica, who explains that Finch paid her $200 so she would tell multiple girls that he was great at sex. The rumors evolved to the point of people hearing that Finch beat up Stifler and had an affair with an older woman, the latter of which Jessica calls her favorite rumor. After Finch's reputation is destroyed due to a diarrhea incident at school, he meets up with headphone-wearing Jessica during prom, who hands him a $50 alcohol flask with his first initial engraved on it. She explains that she spent the other $150 on her earrings, and when Finch attempts to pull her hair back to look, she reminds Finch that he has no chance of having sex with her, to which Finch agrees.

In American Pie 2, Jessica is seen with Vicky at Stifler's start-of-summer house party, and she comments on the tension between former lovers Kevin and Vicky. After Kevin tells Vicky he had sex with three girls during his freshman year of college, she tells this to Jessica, who tells her she forgot to apply the "rule of three" (fake body count divided by three equals real body count). Vicky is confused as to why Kevin would lie to her, but Jessica brushes it off as simply using the rule. During the end-of-summer lake house party hosted by the guys, Jessica and Stifler share a sexually tense moment after expressing awe that Sherman is about to have sex with Nadia. They both laugh it off, however, and down their drinks.

Jessica has a brief cameo at the end of American Reunion, where she greets Kevin and compliments his beard. She then reveals that she is a lesbian and introduces her girlfriend to Kevin. Stifler then comes over and tells Jessica and her girlfriend to kiss so they can prove their sexuality. Jessica's girlfriend then menacingly shakes Stifler's hand, which prompts him to act nicely to Jessica, who disregards him. Jessica tells Kevin to go over to talk to and console Vicky, who is sitting at a table by herself.

A rather lengthy deleted scene shows Jessica and Finch catching up, with Jessica also giving him some pointers on sex with Selena.

=== Nadia ===
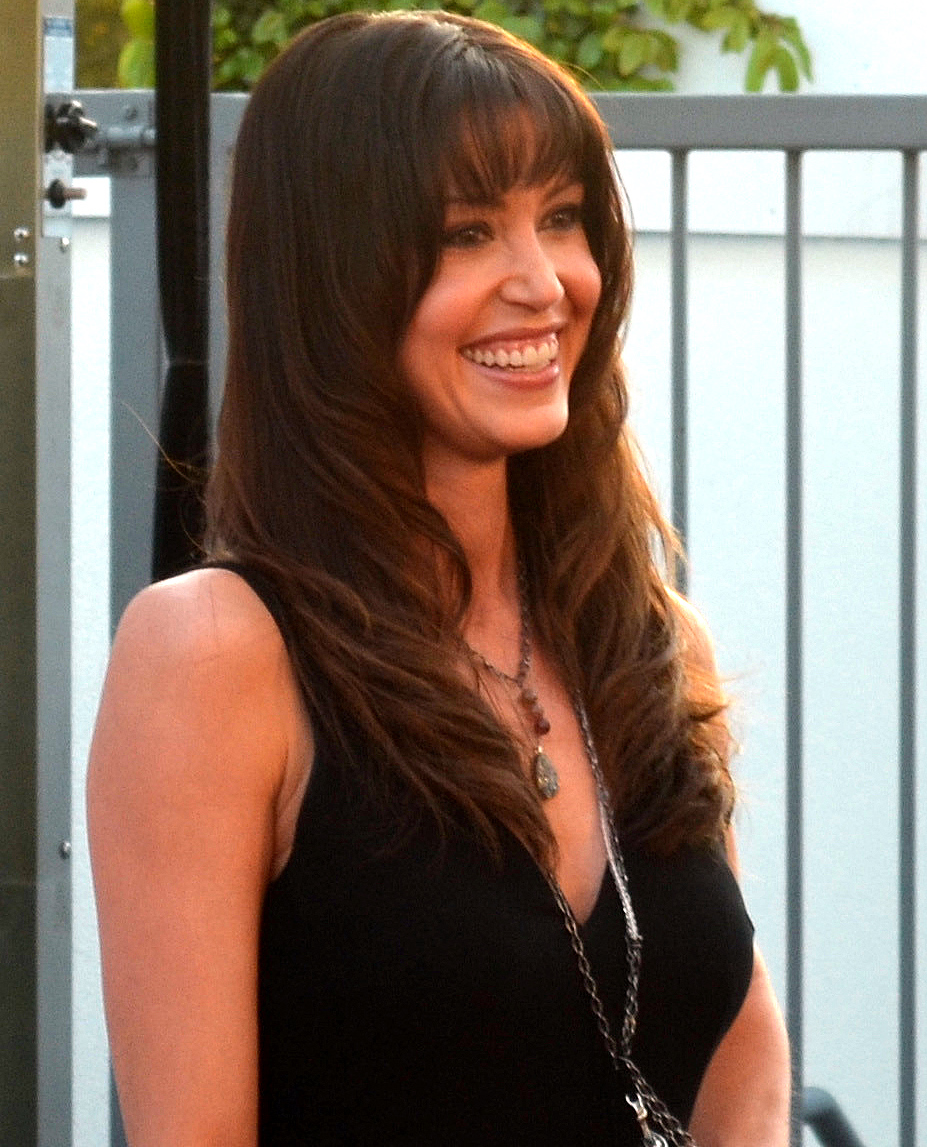
Shannon Elizabeth

- Portrayed by Shannon Elizabeth
- Appeared in: American Pie, American Pie 2, and American Reunion

Nadia is a Czech exchange student in American Pie to whom Jim attempted to lose his virginity. At one of Stifler's house parties, Jim goes over to talk to Nadia after she looks over at him from across the room, but he awkwardly laughs and walks away. At school one day, Nadia stops Jim in the hallway after history class and asks if she can come over to his house to study. She also asks if she can change, since she has ballet practice. Stifler persuades Jim to set up a webcam in his room so that they can all watch Nadia get naked. The plan at first seems to suffer a hiccup, however, when Nadia discovers Jim's pornography collection and sits half-naked on his bed to read it, but this makes her stay. Jim is persuaded to return to his room in order to seduce Nadia, where he joins Nadia, unaware that he accidentally sent the weblink to the entire school directory. Nadia (thanks to her fetish for geeks) tells Jim to strip slowly for her after he sees her naked. When he does so, this manages to turn her on, giving Jim the chance to be deflowered. As Nadia is preparing to have sex with him, he prematurely ejaculates not once but twice, humiliating himself live in front of the entire school. Shortly afterwards, Nadia is forced to leave school and go back home after her exchange family sees the video, leaving Jim completely dateless for prom. In the ending scene, Jim joins a webcam call with Nadia and starts dancing and stripping, much to Nadia's joy.

Nadia makes her second appearance in American Pie 2. Traveling across the US, Nadia tells Jim that she is coming over at the end of the summer to visit him. When Nadia turns up at the lake house earlier than expected, Michelle acts as his fake girlfriend so that he won't have to have sex with Nadia until his penis has healed. At the party, Jim realizes that it isn't Nadia he wants, but Michelle. Nadia is disappointed that Jim chose a geek over her, but is happy for Jim and allows him to go and find Michelle, performing at band camp. Meanwhile, the geeky Sherman mulls around at the party in a depressed mood, having abandoned his "Sherminator" mantra from the first film due to his abject failure with girls. By chance, he begins talking to the rejected Nadia, who is also depressed, and the two hit it off almost instantly. Nadia encourages Sherman to become the Sherminator once more, displaying a desire/fetish for geeks, and excitedly drags him into an upstairs bedroom where Sherman finally loses his virginity, to the shock of Stifler and Jessica.

Although she does not appear in American Wedding, Jim has doubts about if he made the right decision in choosing Michelle over Nadia, after Stifler says that it was the biggest mistake Jim has ever made. This prompts Jim to have a chat with his father, Noah, who apparently has a minor attraction to Nadia. Noah at first tries to brush off the idea of being with Nadia, but after Jim asks if he would sleep with her if he was her age and not married, Noah immediately answers "In a heartbeat". She is not mentioned again for the remainder of the film.

Nadia is mentioned briefly in The Book of Love, by her cousin currently attending East Great Falls High.

In American Reunion, Nadia briefly sees Jim and Michelle at the high school reunion, walking in on them having sex in the band room. She is at the reunion with her boyfriend, who bears a striking resemblance to Jim but is much shorter.

=== Chuck Sherman ===
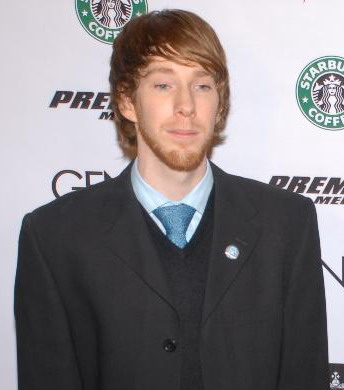
Chris Owen

- Portrayed by Chris Owen
- Appeared in: American Pie, American Pie 2, American Pie Presents Band Camp, and American Reunion

Chuck "The Sherminator" Sherman first appears in American Pie, when he claims to have lost his virginity at a party hosted by classmate Steve Stifler. At the prom, everything seems hopeless for the four boys until Vicky asks the girl that Chuck Sherman claimed to have bedded about her "first time". She proclaims to everyone at the prom that she and Sherman did not have sex at Stifler's party, leaving Sherman embarrassed and making him wet himself.

He reappears in the second film where he goes to the end-of-summer lake house party hosted by Jim and his friends. Later he mulls around at the party in a depressed mood, having abandoned his "Sherminator" mantra from the first film due to his abject failure with girls. By chance, he begins talking to the rejected Nadia, who is also depressed, and the two hit it off almost instantly. Nadia encourages Sherman to become the Sherminator once more, displaying a desire/fetish for geeks, and excitedly drags him into an upstairs bedroom where Sherman finally loses his virginity, to the shock of Stifler.

He reappears in American Pie Presents: Band Camp when Matt Stifler plays a prank on the school band. Sherman, who is now the school's guidance counselor, decides that a worthwhile punishment would be for Stifler to attend band camp.

He has appeared at the East Great Falls High reunion in American Reunion. He told Stifler he got married, had a son named Furlong and later divorced. He moves on quickly when he sees the most popular girl in high school everyone had a crush on (who has since put on considerable weight), and picks her up using his Sherminator persona.

=== Matt Stifler ===
- Portrayed by Eli Marienthal in American Pie and American Pie 2, and Tad Hilgenbrink in American Pie Presents Band Camp
- Appeared in: American Pie, American Pie 2 and American Pie Presents Band Camp

Matt Stifler is a fictional character from the American Pie series of teen comedy films. He is the younger brother of Steve Stifler and second son of Janine Stifler. His first name was not revealed until his appearance in the first spin-off Band Camp. He was featured in the first two installments in the theatrical series and then given his own straight-to-DVD spin-off, American Pie Presents: Band Camp.

Matt was first introduced to the series alongside his elder brother watching Nadia, the foreign exchange student, strip-tease in Jim Levenstein's bed room. And then lastly when Vicky opened the closet and Matt comes out. His next appearance was in American Pie 2, where he requested to stay along with his brother in their summer beach house. In this film, set a year after the first, Matt begun to show his interest in girls and even at his young age showed signs of the infamous Stifler Sex Drive. Although Steve teaches him several lessons on how to get girls, when it comes to the night of the party he simply puts Matt on watch-dog duty. Angered, Matt waits outside and begins to aimlessly work his walkie-talkie. Much to his surprise and pleasure, however, he accidentally comes across the signal of the girls across the street. After being asked who's speaking, an eager-to-impress Matt states they are in fact talking to "the Stiffmeister". He manages to impress the girls enough to meet up with him but his prize is cut short when his brother intervenes successfully wooing the girls into bed with him. Matt leaves the next day, his hands full of porn videos, bidding goodbye to Steve and his friends.

Matt's next appearance was as a starring role in Band Camp, which sees him eager to join the family business of making amateur porn films. On the day of the seniors graduation, he and his friends spray the band instruments with pepper spray. The prank, however, is cut short after Matt accidentally left the pepper spray open and leaking in his pocket evidently burning his penis. The band, unable to see due to the spray, accidentally destroy the set inadvertently revealing Matt as the culprit. As punishment, he must endure his summer at Band Camp. Now classed by his old friends as a bandee, Matt tries to prove himself by filming his fellow band members sexual activities throughout the summer. However, as the summer progresses, Matt suddenly develops a friendship with his fellow campers and romantic feelings for the drum major Elyse, whom he had recently had an off screen relationship with prior. With the help of Mr Levenstein, Matt realizes that living in his brother's shadow and following in his footsteps isn't what he should be doing. By the end of the film, Matt reforms himself much like his older brother did in American Wedding. However, he is still content on insulting his peers and still has an active sex drive but appears far less selfish, nasty and bullying.

Matt's next appearance is a simple cameo in the second spin-off Naked Mile, where he is introduced as a picture on his younger cousin, Erik's, wall as a "legendary Stifler Boy", implying that whilst he learnt his lesson in Band Camp, he still acts with Stifler traits. He is mentioned again later by Mr. Levenstein after Erik asks if he could ask for some advice.

He has another cameo in Book of Love as a name written on the rent card of "The Bible" (The School's Sex Manual), implying that he must have rented it out at some point during his school years.

Evidently, Matt looks up to his older brother as a role model, and initially hopes to be just like him. However, after the events of Band Camp, he realizes that this future isn't as good as it previously seemed. Matt is notable to be possibly the only member of the Stifler family, aside from his older brother in American Wedding, to realize that the "Stifler Legacy" isn't necessarily a good one. He is also different from other Stiflers as Mr. Levenstein notes that people actually want to like him but they find it difficult due to the way he acts.

=== John and Justin ===
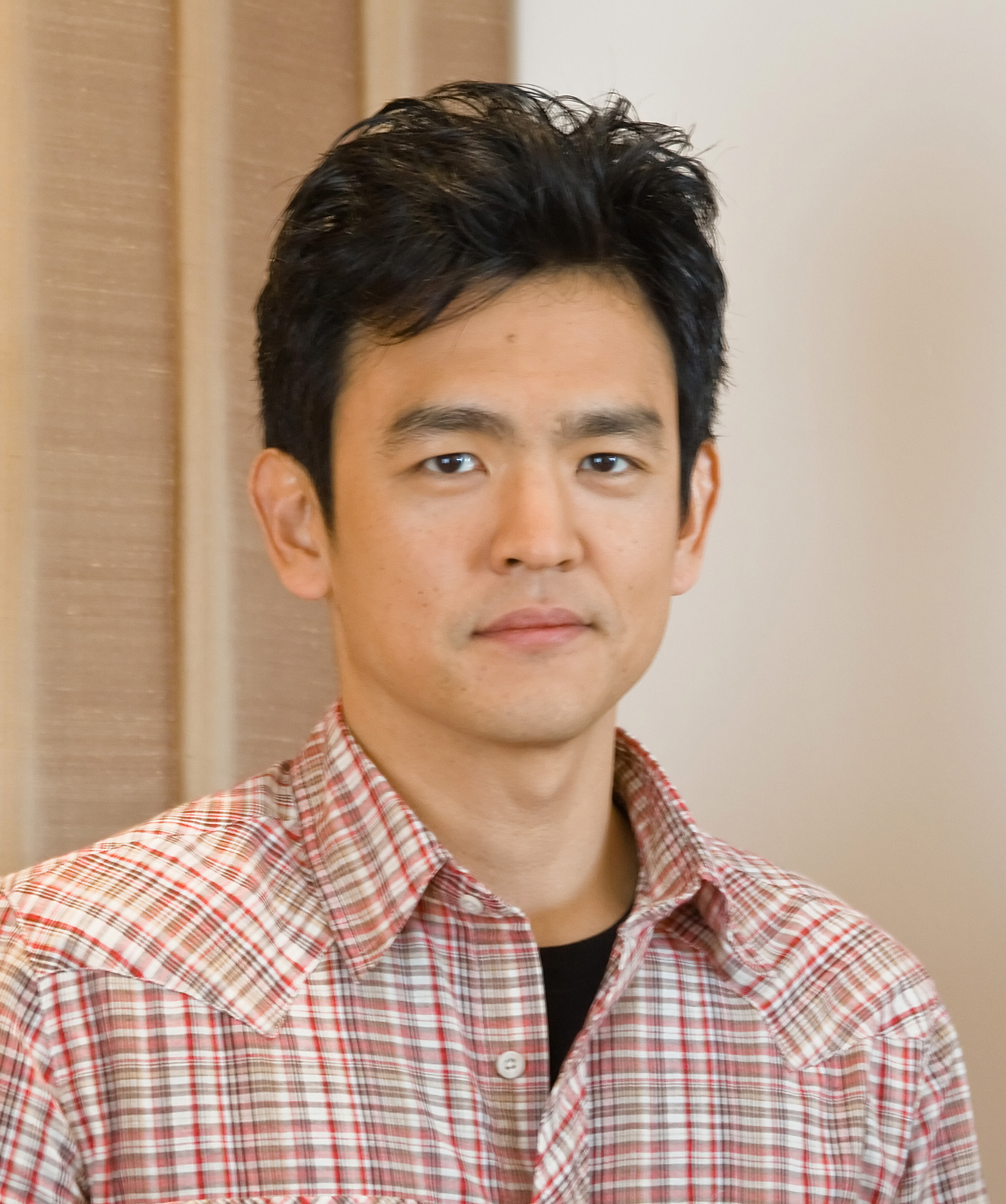
John Cho

- Portrayed by John Cho and Justin Isfield
- Appeared in: American Pie, American Pie 2, American Wedding, and American Reunion

The two are often referred to as the "MILF Guys" and are named after their portrayers, though John is the only one to have been referred to by name, which occurred in American Wedding. The two first appear in American Pie, where they are seen at Stifler's Party. Here they are seen chanting "MILF" at a picture of Stifler's Mom. John also is a choir member. Though their role was brief and minor, their appearance in the film has been significant as the term "MILF" has since become popular due to the usage in the film by John and Justin. They are also friends with the core four Kevin, Jim, Oz and Finch.

Their next appearance is in American Pie 2 in a slightly larger role. They are first seen at Stifler's party, once again. They are waiting to get into the bathroom, when they come across Paul Finch, who slept with Stifler's Mom in the first film. John and Justin admire Finch and ask him how he did it. They are next seen when John, in a memorable scene, urinates off of a balcony and onto Stifler's head, unintentionally. Justin covers his back as he does so. The two walk off and are not seen again until the climatic party scene at the beach house. They are seen getting drunk and partying with various women. The last we see of them is the two of them walking off on the beach, with John saying "Am I gonna have a hangover? 'Cause I want one."

They reappear in American Wedding, where John's name is revealed for the first time. The two serve as two ushers at Jim and Michelle's wedding. They are tasked with looking after Jim's grandma, but end up putting her inside a broom closet instead. John and Justin are last seen outside of Stifler's Mom's room window, peering in to see her taking a bath, where they see Paul Finch emerge from the water, performing cunnilingus on her. They once again chant "MILF", before the window steams up and obscures their view as Finch goes back under the water.

Their last appearance is in American Reunion. John has a much bigger role in this, and his character is expanded upon, while Justin only makes a brief cameo. John and Justin's names are never mentioned as they are credited as simply "MILF Guy #2" and "MILF Guy #1", respectively. John is first seen pulling up alongside Jim's car, as he has just crashed. He is panicking and asking if he is okay, until he realizes it is Jim. The two become reacquainted and talk to each other. John reveals he is organizing the reunion. He also mentions that he and his "MILF" buddy Justin are not on good terms right now, and would rather not speak of him. He sees Kara get out from Jim's lap, and, thinking it's Michelle, assumes she is performing fellatio on him. John laughs and gives a thumbs up to Jim before driving off. He is again seen at Stifler's party, where he almost blows Jim's cover by saying he saw Jim and Michelle last night, but then walks off before he can elaborate on it. He later watches Oz compete on the Celebrity Dance-Off video. He helps in the fight by throwing a weapon to Finch. When the cops arrive, John runs out of the house. At the reunion, John hands out name tags to all the class of '99. He is last seen in the bleachers, watching Stifler and Finch's Mom having sexual intercourse. He is drinking heavily and is depressed, due to Justin's absence. He hears "MILF" uttered to the side of him, and turns to see Justin. The two repeatedly say "MILF" softly to each other leading into their chant "MILF! MILF!" and then hug; the two continue to watch Stifler and Finch's Mom have sex as they gleefully chant.

Despite his effeminate behavior, according to the directors' commentary on American Reunion, John is a heterosexual.

=== Jeanine Stifler ===
- Portrayed by Jennifer Coolidge
- Appeared in: American Pie, American Pie 2, American Wedding, and American Reunion

Although the role of Jeanine is limited, the character becomes important mostly at the end of the movies. Her first name is revealed in the second film but more often she's referred to as Stifler's Mom by the characters.

Jeanine Stifler is the divorced mother of Steve and Matt Stifler. When Jim and his friends are at Stifler's house they see a picture of her. They are impressed and all want to have sex with her. Jeanine turns up at the end of the movie. She meets Paul Finch while he is exploring the house and enters the billiard room where she is sitting. Jeanine tries to seduce Paul (although the opposite is also true) and they have sex on the billiard table. They are caught by Steven.

In American Pie 2 there are many references to this incident. Jeanine is expected to be at the beach house where Jim, Paul, Steven and the others stay during their vacation. Paul, still in love with Jeanine, learned to control his sexual drifts via meditation and hopes to have sex with her once again. Stifler is certain this will not happen again. Just before the boys head home, a car turns up driven by Jeanine. She asks Paul if she can drive him home, to which he agrees. Stifler, who is still in the house, is told a lost tourist was asking the way and Paul decided to travel home on his own. However, Stifler is suspicious about the guys claims, demanding them to tell him who is that tourist in the car. In the next scene, Jeanine and Paul have sex in the car.

In American Wedding, Paul tells Steven he had sex twice with Jeanine, further fueling his anger. Once again, Jeanine turns up at the end of the movie. She tells Paul not to be interested in her anymore, to which he agrees. However, it is now revealed they had sex more than twice. They get excited and leave. In next scene, they have sex while taking a bath.

In American Reunion, Jeanine appears in a bigger role. She has grown tired of being looked upon as a sexual object and breaks up with a loser boyfriend. She later meets Jim's father Noah Levenstein, who is now a widower. Jeanine is smitten with Noah and they talk about their son's embarrassing moments in puberty while sharing a laugh. The two start a relationship by going to a movie, where she is touched at him for being a gentleman by treating her more like a woman.

== Characters from American Pie 2 ==
=== Amber and Danielle ===
- Portrayed by Lisa Arturo and Denise Faye
- Appeared in: American Pie 2

Amber and Danielle are fictional characters from the American Pie series of teen comedy films. They first appear when Kevin finds work for himself and his friends as painters and decorators for a house nearby. Stifler is intrigued by Amber and Danielle the owners, who appear to be lesbians, and excitedly breaks into their house while they're away. Jim and Finch follow him, trying to get him out, but they are caught by Amber and Danielle, who relent on calling the police. But after Stifler identifies his interest in their homosexuality, they insist on the boys performing "like for like" homosexual acts on each other in return for being able to watch the girls do the same thing. The boys soon leave after they request the boys to go further than they are prepared. Stifler later goes on to have a threesome with them, when they turn out to be bisexual and are found by Matt on the walkie talkies.

== Characters from American Wedding ==
=== Cadence Flaherty ===
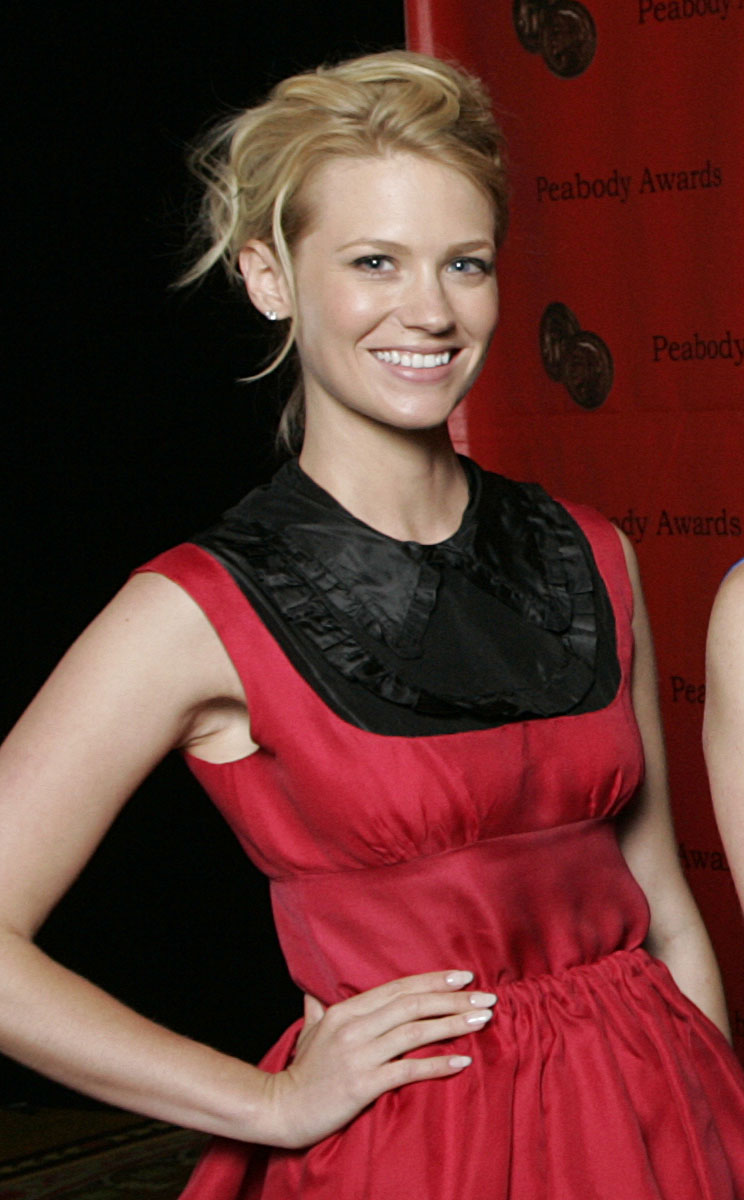
January Jones

- Portrayed by January Jones
- Appeared in: American Wedding

Cadence Flaherty is a fictional character from the American Pie series of teen comedy films. She appears in American Wedding as Michelle's sister who is attending her wedding, and Finch is quickly attracted to her. Stifler also becomes attracted to her. Upon hearing that Cadence is hoping to attract a decent guy, Stifler adopts a more meek attitude and acts like Finch, and avoids swearing and speaks of philosophy. But when Finch realizes that Cadence is beginning to tire of the intellectual Stifler, Finch acts immature, rude, and perverted: in other words, like Stifler. Cadence begins to catch on that her two suitors are acting like each other, so the question of who she will choose becomes more complicated. Stifler unintentionally kills the flowers the night before the wedding, and actually feels bad about it, prompting him to bring in the football team he coaches to set up the entire room with new flowers. Cadence chooses Stifler, and Finch admits that Stifler was probably better for her anyway. They broke at the end of American Wedding and she never lost her virginity. By the events of American Reunion, Cadence and Stifler have broken up, and she is never mentioned. Her picture appears in the flashback montage during the end credits.

=== Bear ===
- Portrayed by Eric Allan Kramer
- Appeared in: American Wedding

Bear (aka Mr. Belvedere) is a fictional character from the American Pie series of teen comedy films. He appears in American Wedding as Stifler's new buddy. He is a burly homosexual man who is a regular at a gay bar the boys unwittingly visit, to find a fashion designer named Leslie Sommers to make Michelle's wedding dress. Initially, he is offended by Stifler's rude remarks and behavior, but after the two engage in a dance-off, Stifler wins over Bear and the other patrons, and the two become instant friends. He gladly provides strippers for the bachelor party and even parties with them. However, when Jim and the Flahertys return and interrupt the party, Bear helps the boys pretend nothing is going on by posing as an English butler named "Mr. Belvedere". He later attends the wedding, and dances with his date during the reception. He does not reappear in American Reunion.

=== Grandma Levenstein ===
- Portrayed by Angela Paton
- Appeared in: American Wedding

Grandma Levenstein is a fictional character from the American Pie series of teen comedy films. She appears in American Wedding and is introduced to be Jim's grandmother and Noah's mother. In the deleted scenes it is revealed that She does not have much longer to live so the wedding is moved up so She can attend. She voices her disapproval towards Michelle for not being Jewish. Jim, Kevin and Finch recruits John and Justin to keep an eye on her. However, they put Grandma Levenstein in the closet due to her constant complaining in her disapproval against Jim and Michelle's wedding. Stifler walked inside the closet and believed her to be Cadence that he has sex with her. Only when Kevin and Finch open the closet, he is horrified that he had sex with Jim's grandmother, who tells him to focus more. After this, she acts more friendly and kind, especially to Stifler who is still horrified by the whole thing.

== Characters from American Reunion ==
Past cast members including Jason Biggs, Seann William Scott, Eugene Levy, Alyson Hannigan, Chris Klein, Mena Suvari, Thomas Ian Nicholas, Tara Reid, Natasha Lyonne, Eddie Kaye Thomas, Shannon Elizabeth, Chris Owen, Jennifer Coolidge, and John Cho all appear in the film as their respective characters.

=== Evan Levenstein ===
- Portrayed by George Christopher Bianchi
- Appeared in: American Reunion

Evan Levenstein is Jim's and Michelle's two-year-old son, and the grandson of Noah Levenstein and the late Mrs. Levenstein.

=== Kara ===
- Portrayed by Ali Cobrin
- Appeared in: American Reunion

Kara is a high school senior whom Jim used to babysit. Having just turned 18, she tries to lose her virginity to him, while she is drunk from a high school party, but ends up passing out in his car after she has taken her clothes off. Jim then has to return her to her parents' house without her parents seeing them.

=== AJ ===
- Portrayed by Chuck Hittinger
- Appeared in: American Reunion

AJ is a high school senior who is Kara's boyfriend, who's sexually frustrated and is ready to have sex with Kara, who's holding out until the "right time". He is arrogant, selfish, hostile, and extremely paranoid, thinking Jim is trying to steal Kara from him. He is similar to Steve Stifler in the American Pie series. Throughout the film, he harasses the gang (especially Jim and Stifler), which ultimately leads to a big fight between the teens (AJ and his crew), and the '99 gang (consisting of Jim, Oz, Finch, Stifler, Kevin, John, and Michelle). He serves as the main antagonist out of the three villains.

=== Dr. Ron ===
- Portrayed by Jay Harrington
- Appeared in: American Reunion

Ron is Heather's new boyfriend. He takes great joy in both embarrassing and patronizing Oz, such as providing the DVD to his appearance on Celebrity Dance-Off in order to not only humiliate him but to make him look bad in front of Heather. When he catches Oz kissing Heather, he dares him to punch him so he can sue him, but Stifler intervenes and punches him because if he sues him and not Oz, he'll get nothing because he isn't worth anything.

=== Mia ===
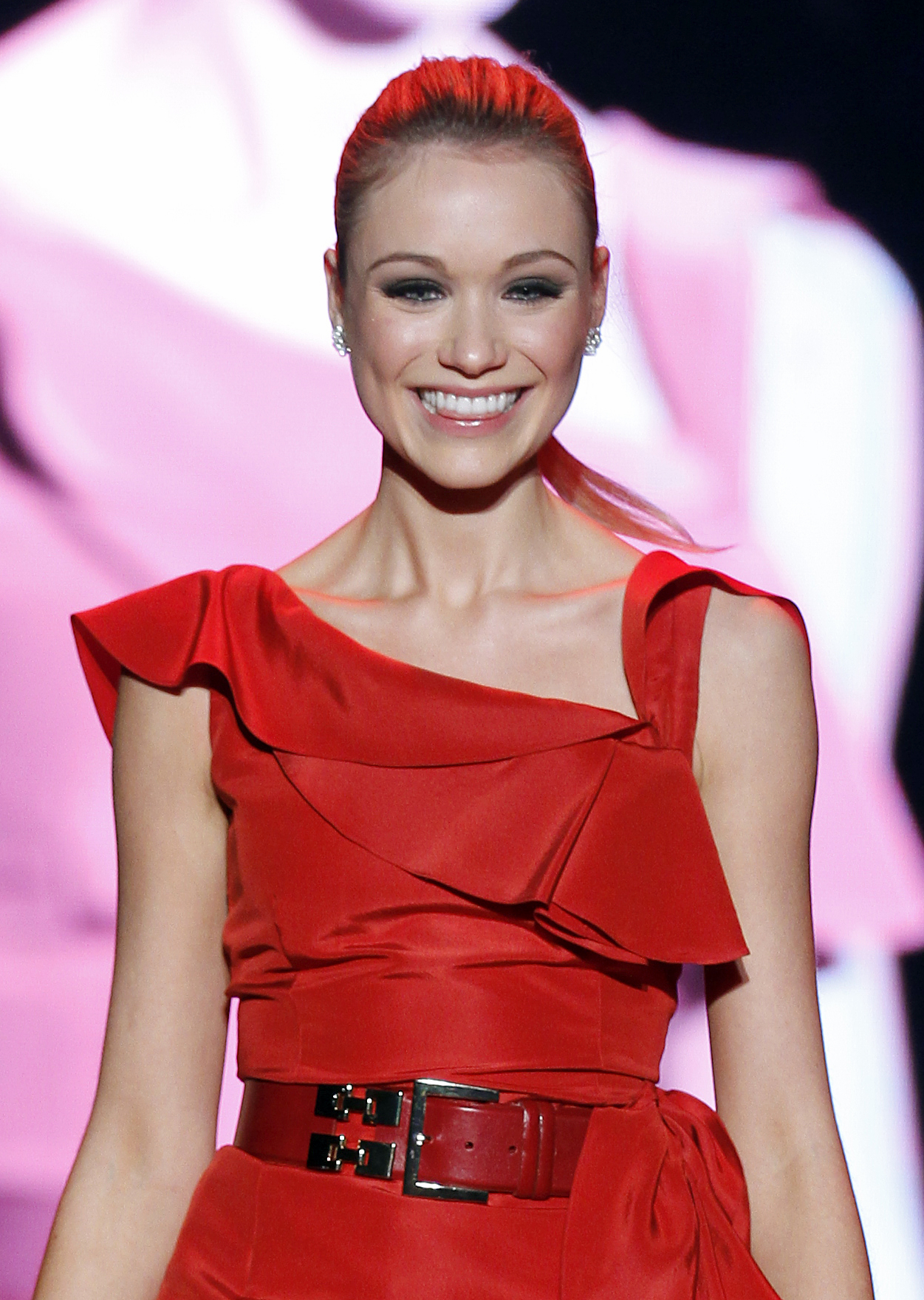
Katrina Bowden

- Portrayed by Katrina Bowden
- Appeared in: American Reunion

Mia is Oz's much younger supermodel girlfriend from Los Angeles, and one of the three antagonists of the film. She accompanies her boyfriend to his high school reunion, where Oz eventually re-connects with his ex-girlfriend Heather. Throughout the movie, she is implied to be very wild and sexually promiscuous, such as when she admits to having been in an orgy and cheating on Oz with Mario Lopez.

=== Selena Vega ===
- Portrayed by Dania Ramirez
- Appeared in: American Reunion

Selena is Finch's girlfriend and Michelle's best friend from band. As a teenager, she had pimples and was obese. As an adult, she works as a bartender at a local pub. Upon meeting her, Finch immediately recognizes her, and the two soon hit it off, and begin dating. She falls in love with Finch, not because of his "interesting" lifestyle but because he was the only person that was nice to her during their high school days. She's shown to have the same hyperactive sex drive as Michelle. In the end, Finch and Selena plan a vacation to Europe, implying that the couple will have a future together.

=== Madison and Alexa ===
- Portrayed by Jennifer Bell (Madison) and Autumn Dial (Alexa)
- Appeared in: American Reunion

Madison and Alexa are Kara's best friends. They are first seen at her party where Stifler tries to impress them by saying he likes Twilight. When Stifler takes a call on his phone the two ditch him.

== Characters from American Pie Presents: Band Camp ==
=== Elyse Houston ===
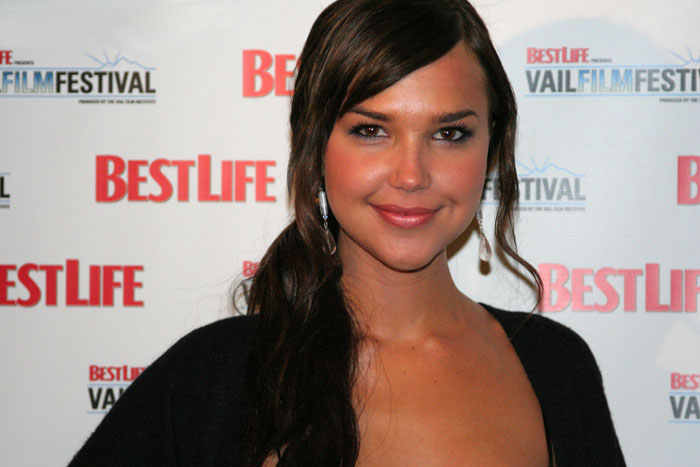
Arielle Kebbel

- Portrayed by Arielle Kebbel
- Appeared in: American Pie Presents: Band Camp

Elyse Houston is a fictional character from the American Pie series of teen comedy films. She appears in Band Camp as a love interest for Matt Stifler. When the school bands compete for points throughout camp, with East Great Falls leading on the last day until a prank by Stifler in which he was originally supposed to sabotage the other band so as to help Elyse, causes the band to lose and Elyse to lose a chance at a scholarship. Once the new term starts Matt attempts to fix his mistakes and persuades the school band to play Elyse's piece to the Conservatory head to impress the board which wins Elyse a scholarship, and Matt her affection.

Dialogue between Matt and Elyse suggest they were previously friends. This ended, however, after Elyse became tired with his frequent pranks and putdowns toward her for the appeasement of his brother. Despite this, they reconcile toward the end of the movie.

=== Brandon Vandecamp ===
- Portrayed by Matt Barr
- Appeared in: American Pie Presents: Band Camp

Brandon Vandecamp is a fictional character from the American Pie series of teen comedy films. He is the antagonist of Band camp as well as the camp's school council leader. He immediately takes a dislike to Matt and the two later have a musical duel as to which he wins. Brandon wins a scholarship when his band wins the competition for points but he is later disqualified and Elyse gets it.

=== Ernie Kaplowitz ===
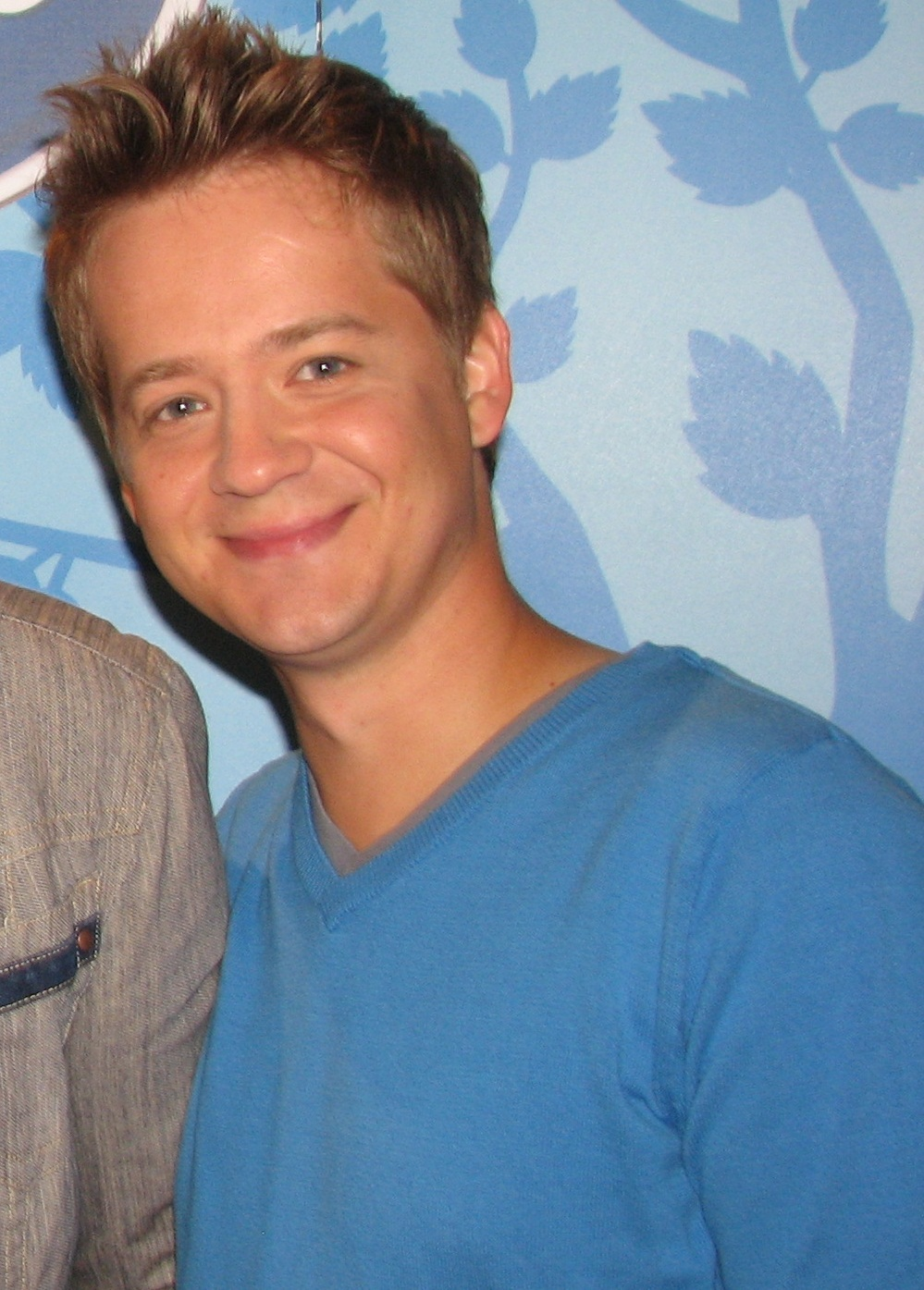
Jason Earles

- Portrayed by Jason Earles
- Appeared in: American Pie Presents: Band Camp

Ernie Kalpowitz is a fictional character from the American Pie series of teen comedy films. He is the geeky roommate and later friend of Matt. He conspires with Matt to film other band members in a Girls Gone Wild style video, using hidden cameras although he believes it is only for their viewing pleasure. He tries to impress his love interest, Chloe by bringing her a drink with his robot at which he succeeds, eventually earning her affections. He nearly blows his chances when she realizes Matt and Ernie have been filming her, along with many other girls. In the end, they resume their relationship, and during the credits, Ernie is seen playing a saxophone up Chloe's vagina, as she lies down and enjoys it.

=== James "Jimmy" Chong ===
- Portrayed by Jun Hee Lee
- Appeared in: American Pie Presents: Band Camp

James "Jimmy" Chong is a fictional character from the American Pie series of teen comedy films. He appears as a supporting character and as the comic relief of the film. He relays events of inserting his penis into an oboe which he gives Stifler the idea. When Stifler tries it out he is heading to the instrument room he finds Matt with his penis stuck inside an oboe where he reveals he was joking.

He, along with his other fellow bandees turned against Matt after it was revealed he was secretly filming their raunchy misadventures to screen in front of the school at the start of the next semester. However, after Stifler redeemed himself he can be seen hanging around him leaving the presumption that they soon became friends after.

== Characters from American Pie Presents: The Naked Mile ==
=== Erik Stifler ===
- Portrayed by John White
- Appeared in: American Pie Presents: The Naked Mile and American Pie Presents: Beta House

Erik Stifler is a fictional character from the American Pie series of teen comedy films. He is introduced in the second spin-off Naked Mile as Steve and Matt's younger cousin and son to Harry Stifler and his wife. Whilst they share the same last name, Erik is different from other Stiflers in that he does not possess the same sexual prowess, use of swearing and anti-social behavior. He does prove to be easily manipulated, often giving into peer pressure and eager to live up to the Stifler legacy. He is the nice guy of the Stifler family.

In Naked Mile, Erik is ready to graduate high school. However, he is currently about to be the only one in his family to graduate a virgin. Deciding that he is clearly ready when she is not, Erik's girlfriend permits him a "hall pass" giving him the opportunity to do anything over the weekend without consequences. Ready to lose his virginity, he organizes a road trip with his two best friends Mike and Ryan to meet up with his elder cousin Dwight in college during The Naked Mile. Whilst he is presented with several opportunities to have sex, Erik decides he only truly wants to lose it with Tracy, his girlfriend, causing him to ride a horse back to her house and inform her that he doesn't care what happens as long as he's with her. They then reconcile and make love.

Erik returns in American Pie Presents: Beta House as he readies himself for his arrival at college. Tracy dumps Erik off-screen leaving him open for a relationship. Although he performed poorly at the opening party, his last name causes him to become accepted in the Beta Fraternity due to Dwight's legacy. The rest of the film then follows him, Mike Coozeman and his newly found friends and the tasks they perform to get into the frat. Erik also meets a girl named Ashley and begins dating her.

After they complete their final task to get into the fraternity, which involves stealing something from the GEEK house, Edgar, the GEEK's president, challenges the BETAs to the Greek Olympiad. The loser will give up their charter and be evicted from their house. They win the tournament leaving Beta House a permanent fixture at the college.

=== Dwight Stifler ===
- Portrayed by Steve Talley
- Appeared in: American Pie Presents: The Naked Mile and American Pie Presents: Beta House

Dwight Stifler is a fictional character from the American Pie series of teen comedy films and the cousin of Steve, Matt, Erik and Scott. Although he shares the trademark Stifler sex drive, Dwight is shown to be a little less critical of his peers, though more so to his enemies.

He first appears in Naked Mile, introduced by his younger cousin Erik as a "legendary Stifler boy" alongside his other cousins Matt and Steve.

=== Ryan Grimm ===
- Portrayed by Ross Thomas
- Appeared in: American Pie Presents: The Naked Mile

Ryan Grimm is a fictional character from the American Pie series of teen comedy films. Ryan and his friends, Erik and Cooze, plan a road trip to visit Erik's cousin Dwight Stifler at Michigan during an event known as the Naked Mile. They later arrive on campus. Ryan does not appear in the sequel to the Naked Mile due to the character attending college in California.

=== Mike "Cooze" Coozeman ===
- Portrayed by Jake Siegel
- Appeared in: American Pie Presents: The Naked Mile and American Pie Presents: Beta House

Mike "Cooze" Coozeman is a fictional character from the American Pie series of teen comedy films. Cooze and his friends, Erik and Ryan, plan a road trip to visit Erik's cousin Dwight Stifler at Michigan during an event known as the Naked Mile. They later arrive on campus. In the sequel they arrive at college, where he learns that he and Erik will be rooming separately. After they complete their final task, which involves stealing something from the GEEK house, Edgar, the GEEK's president, challenges the BETAs to the Greek Olympiad. The loser will give up their charter and be evicted from their house and the BETAs win. The BETAs move into their new mansion, courtesy of the GEEKs, and hold a massive toga party, where Cooze, much to his relief, finally sleeps with Denise and all suspicions of her being a man are gone. She simply has the rare female ability to ejaculate.

It is repeatedly implied within the film series that Coozeman is a surviving 9/11 hijacker using an assumed identity. In American Pie Presents: The Naked Mile, Coozeman refers to having bailed from a plane in a parachute in 2001, and one of the contacts on his phone is briefly shown as Osama. In American Pie Presents: Beta House, Coozeman's dorm room can be seen to be filled with jars of ball bearings and various fertilizers and chemical components of explosives.

=== Tracy Sterling ===
- Portrayed by Jessy Schram
- Appeared in: American Pie Presents: The Naked Mile

Tracy Sterling is a fictional character from the American Pie series of teen comedy films. She appears as Erik's girlfriend of two years, and tells him she loves him, but is not ready for intercourse. Tracy decides to have sex, their first attempt goes horribly wrong, and she backs out of trying again. Erik plans a road trip to visit Erik's cousin Dwight Stifler in Michigan during an event known as the Naked Mile. Tracy sees this as an opportunity to give Erik a "guilt free weekend pass", hoping that he can quench his lust and get sex out of his system since she is not ready. Erik meets a college girl with a fetish for virgin boys and as they steal a kiss, a news crew captures the moment. Watching the news report about the Naked Mile back at home, Tracy is upset and feels guilty that she allowed Erik the free pass. Her friends convince her to also lose her virginity before he gets back. Later that evening Erik realizes that he loves Tracy and rushes back to see his girlfriend. When he gets to her house, Tracy's dad says she is at a party and Erik arrives at the party just as Tracy has headed upstairs, presumably to lose her virginity to her ex-boyfriend. Erik loudly pounds on the closed bedroom door, proclaiming his love for her. However, Tracy was not in the room because she had decided that she could not go through with her plans. Later that evening, Tracy and Erik decide that they should be each other's first. They make love that night. When Erik returns to the college to pick up his friends the next morning, each boy shares stories of his experiences from the night before. The three friends drive back to East Great Falls. She does not appear in the sequel because she is no longer with Erik, as she has left him for her ex-boyfriend Trent.

=== Rock ===
- Portrayed by Jordan Prentice
- Appeared in: American Pie Presents: The Naked Mile and American Pie Presents: Beta House

Rock is a fictional character from the American Pie series of teen comedy films. Dwight and Rock's fraternity have several clashes including an over-the-top drinking contest, a rough game of football and a brawl. This rivalry comes to a head when the midget fraternity attacks Dwight, landing him in the hospital. During the post-Naked Mile party, Dwight spots Vicky, the girlfriend of Rock, and both have sex. Later, Dwight sends a DVD to Rock that reads, "Payback's a bitch." It reveals both Dwight and Vicky having sex, as Rock yells out, "Stifler!" In the sequel Rock reveals that due to an altercation between Edgar and a sheep, Rock's entire fraternity was kicked off campus. Dwight is hesitant, but Rock states that what they had was a rivalry and that "the enemy of my enemy is my friend." This advice helps the BETAs win the GEEKs in the olympiad.

=== Harry Stifler ===
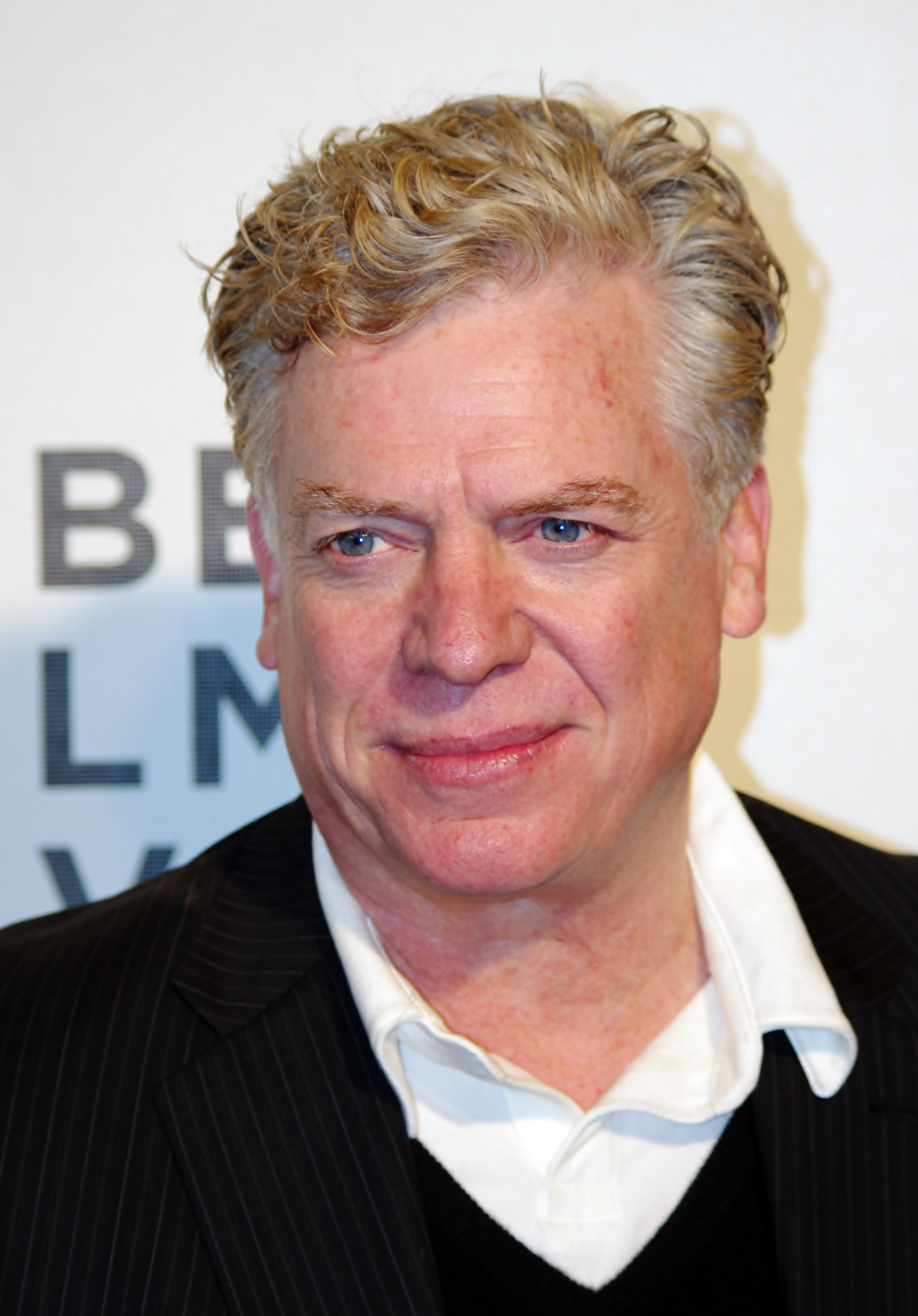
Christopher McDonald

- Portrayed by Christopher McDonald
- Appeared in: American Pie Presents: The Naked Mile and American Pie Presents: Beta House

Harry Stifler is a fictional character from the American Pie series of teen comedy films. He is Erik's father, Jeanine's ex brother-in-law and is married, but was temporarily separated from his wife while Erik was three (during those two weeks, he slept with ten women, including the mother of Erik's friend, Cooze). He frequently complains about his son not living up to the Stifler name with statements such as "Stiflers don't fake sick to pull dick, they cut class to get ass." Erik responds with "I know, that saying is on our family crest." He proves to be a hypocrite, though, when he is seen pleasuring himself with the same dumpster porn that Erik was watching.

=== Bull ===
- Portrayed by Dan Petronijevic
- Appeared in: American Pie Presents: The Naked Mile and American Pie Presents: Beta House

Bull is a fictional character from the American Pie series of teen comedy films. He is a friend of Dwight and appears in the sequel.

=== Jill ===
- Portrayed by Jaclyn A. Smith
- Appeared in: American Pie Presents: The Naked Mile and American Pie Presents: Beta House

Jill is a fictional character from the American Pie series of teen comedy films. She is part of a sorority and Cooze later falls for her. She returns to her part in the sequel.

== Characters from American Pie Presents: Beta House ==
=== Ashley Thomas ===
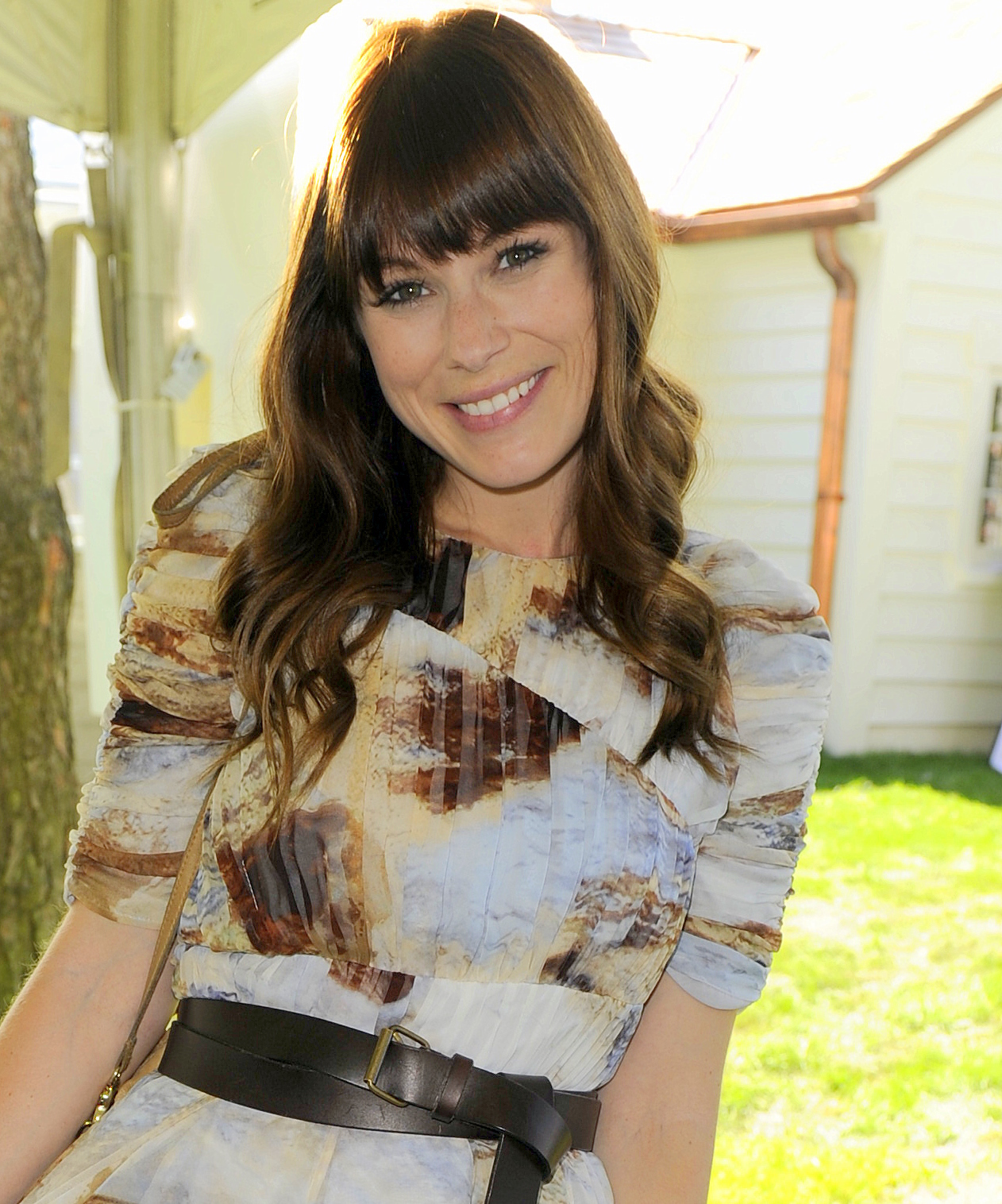
Meghan Heffern

- Portrayed by Meghan Heffern
- Appeared in: American Pie Presents: Beta House

Ashley Thomas is a fictional character from the American Pie series of teen comedy films. She is the love interest of Erik throughout Beta House after they meet in the bathroom where things go well until Erik urinates on his pants. She gets together with Erik after he splits with long-term girlfriend Tracy off screen.

=== Edgar Willis ===
- Portrayed by Tyrone Savage
- Appeared in: American Pie Presents: Beta House

Edgar Willis is a fictional character from the American Pie series of teen comedy films. Edgar is the GEEK's president and challenges the BETAs to the Greek Olympiad. The loser will give up their charter and be evicted from their house. It is revealed by Rock, Dwight's former nemesis, that due to an altercation between Edgar and a sheep, Rock's entire fraternity was kicked off campus. The first competition is won by Beta House as Dwight and Edgar compete by removing girls' bras. Beta House loses next two competitions: a light saber duel and catching a greased pig. When the BETAs and GEEKs reach the final challenge, they use Edgar's wool fetish against him, which ultimately costs him and his house the tournament. As the film ends Edgar is seen hanging out at the Silver Dollar, sniffing the headpiece of the sheep costume. He gives it to a passing stripper, instructing her to use it for her next dance.

=== Bobby ===
- Portrayed by Nick Nicotera
- Appeared in: American Pie Presents: Beta House

Bobby is a fictional character from the American Pie series of teen comedy films. He is Erik's roommate who, along with him and Cooze, pledging the Beta House and trying to complete list of tasks on the Beta House pledge board.

=== Denise ===
- Portrayed by Sarah Power
- Appeared in: American Pie Presents: Beta House

Denise is a fictional character from the American Pie series of teen comedy films. She is the love interest of Erik's best friend Cooze, and the roommate of Erik's love interest Ashley.

== Characters from American Pie Presents: The Book of Love ==
=== Rob Shearson ===
- Portrayed by Bug Hall
- Appeared in: American Pie Presents: The Book of Love

Rob Shearson is a fictional character from the American Pie series of teen comedy films. Rob is introduced as the virgin friend of Nathan and Lube who are labeled as outsiders and geeks. The story begins with Rob entering his bedroom, and attempting to masturbate with a peanut butter and jelly sandwich. While he is doing this his dog, tries to eat the sandwich, and Rob's little brother Cody takes a video of him receiving this unwanted sexual gratification. Later, Rob meets with his friends, Nathan and Marshall Lube, at school. Rob talks to Heidi, a girl he is attracted to, and Stifler. Stifler states that if Rob doesn't make a move on Heidi, he will. Rob and Heidi meet later in the school library where she discloses that she is a virgin, and wishes to just "get it [sex] over with". At the school dance, Nathan tries to get to second base with Dana, but only manages to offend her due to her abstinance pledge. Rob attempts to tell Heidi how he feels about her but is interrupted by Nathan and Lube. He eventually finds her in the library about to have sex with another student, and drops a lit candle in a bin in shock. This sets the library on fire, which sets off the water sprinklers. The next day, when Rob and Heidi are cleaning the library, Rob finds a secret compartment containing "The Bible". He shows the book to his friends Nathan and Lube and explains that it is a sex manual that has been compiled over 40 years by the students who found it. The book is regarded as legendary, but unfortunately has been damaged by the water. Later in the local mall, Rob attempts to test a tip in the book, "Simple Flattery". He approaches Ashley in a lingerie store and compliments her. Ashley leads him into a changing room, takes off her bra and top, and makes him steal a bra for her. Unfortunately Rob is caught and forced to pay for the bra with his mom's credit card. When she receives her credit card bill, Rob's mom tries to talk to him about buying underwear, prompting Rob to sarcastically say that he likes wearing women's underwear. He is again filmed by his little brother, who again posts the footage on the internet for the whole school to see. The next day, Heidi, Imogen and Dana are spectating at a school basketball game in which Rob and Stifler are playing in which they help the team win by going to the playoffs. Rob again attempts to tell Heidi how he feels, but is unable to. Lube discovers a page in The Bible which tells of a brothel in Canada and a prostitute, Monique, who is very experienced. The entry was written in 1975, but Lube misreads the date as 1995, and they decide to visit. When they meet Monique the boys are disgusted, but Nathan states that they should go for it anyway. Nathan and Lube make Rob go first, but Monique dies while performing oral sex on him. They panic and drive back to the USA. Rob and Heidi are once again in the library where Rob finally tells her he is attracted to her. Heidi says she feels the same, and they agree to meet at Stifler's party later. At the party Heidi hears Rob shout "Tonight, I'm getting laid!", and runs upstairs. Stifler again brushes off Katie when she tries to talk to him. Heidi follows him downstairs, but Rob refuses to talk to her and begins to drink heavily. He declares to Lube and Nathan that "assholes get laid!", which gets some cheers from other boys. Then he behaves crudely to a random girl, who promptly goes to bed with him. She asks him to have sex with her from behind, but he hallucinates and sees Heidi saying; "You aren't seriously going to stick your dick in that, are you?" Rob then throws up on the girl's back. The next morning his mother asks him if he drove home drunk, and shows him a film she received on her phone of Rob throwing up on the girl the night before. Rob and his friends resolve to find all of the people who originally wrote it in order to recreate it, starting with the original creator, Noah Levenstein. They eventually succeed in recreating the book. Rob and his friends then go on the school ski trip. Heidi and Rob are riding up the mountain in a gondola ski lift, but Nathan has sex with Dana in the lift control room and accidentally shut off the lifts' power. In one lift, Rob and Heidi reconcile and kiss. Heidi and Rob return to the cabin and have sex.

The story ends with Rob, Nathan and Lube returning the newly restored Bible to where Rob found it, after Rob has added his signature to it. As a finale, Rob's brother, Cody, enters his bedroom to find an online film of him putting a vacuum cleaner on his penis. To his horror it has been viewed almost 10 million times. Rob ends the film with the words "Gotchaaaaa, ha ha."

=== Scott Stifler ===
- Portrayed by John Patrick Jordan
- Appeared in: American Pie Presents: The Book of Love

Scott Stifler is a fictional character from the American Pie series of teen comedy films. His obnoxious behavior, everlasting sex drive, and frequent insults are more in common with his elder cousins Steve and Dwight than Erik and Matt. Taking the helm from Steve, Scott hosts some of the most infamous and raunchy parties the students at East Great Falls have to offer.

=== Nathan Jenkyll ===
- Portrayed by Kevin M. Horton
- Appeared in: American Pie Presents: The Book of Love

Nathan Jenkyll is a fictional character from the American Pie series of teen comedy films. Nathan reveals that his girlfriend, Dana, has pledged to abstain from sex until marriage despite the fact that she has already slept with six other people. At the school dance, Nathan tries to get to second base with Dana, but only manages to offend her due to her abstinance pledge. Nathan goes to Dana's church service to talk to her, but accidentally broadcasts the explicit and highly personal conversation to the entire congregation on the church's PA system. Dana's father then bans Dana from seeing Nathan. Nathan attempts to reconcile with Dana but offends her, making her leave once again. The next day, when Rob and Heidi are cleaning the library, Rob finds a secret compartment containing "The Bible". He shows the book to his friends Nathan and Lube and explains that it is a sex manual that has been compiled over 40 years by the students who found it. Lube discovers a page in The Bible which tells of a brothel in Canada and a prostitute, Monique, who is very experienced. The entry was written in 1975, but Lube misreads the date as 1995, and they decide to visit. When they meet Monique the boys are disgusted, but Nathan states that they should go for it anyway. Nathan and Lube make Rob go first, but Monique dies while performing oral sex on him. They panic and drive back to the USA. In an attempt to restore The Bible, Rob and his friends resolve to find all of the people who originally wrote it in order to recreate it, starting with the original creator, Noah Levenstein. They eventually succeed in recreating the book. Rob and his friends then go on the school ski trip. Nathan has sex with Dana in the lift control room and accidentally shut off the lifts' power, leaving his friends trapped.

=== Marshall "Lube" Lubetsky ===
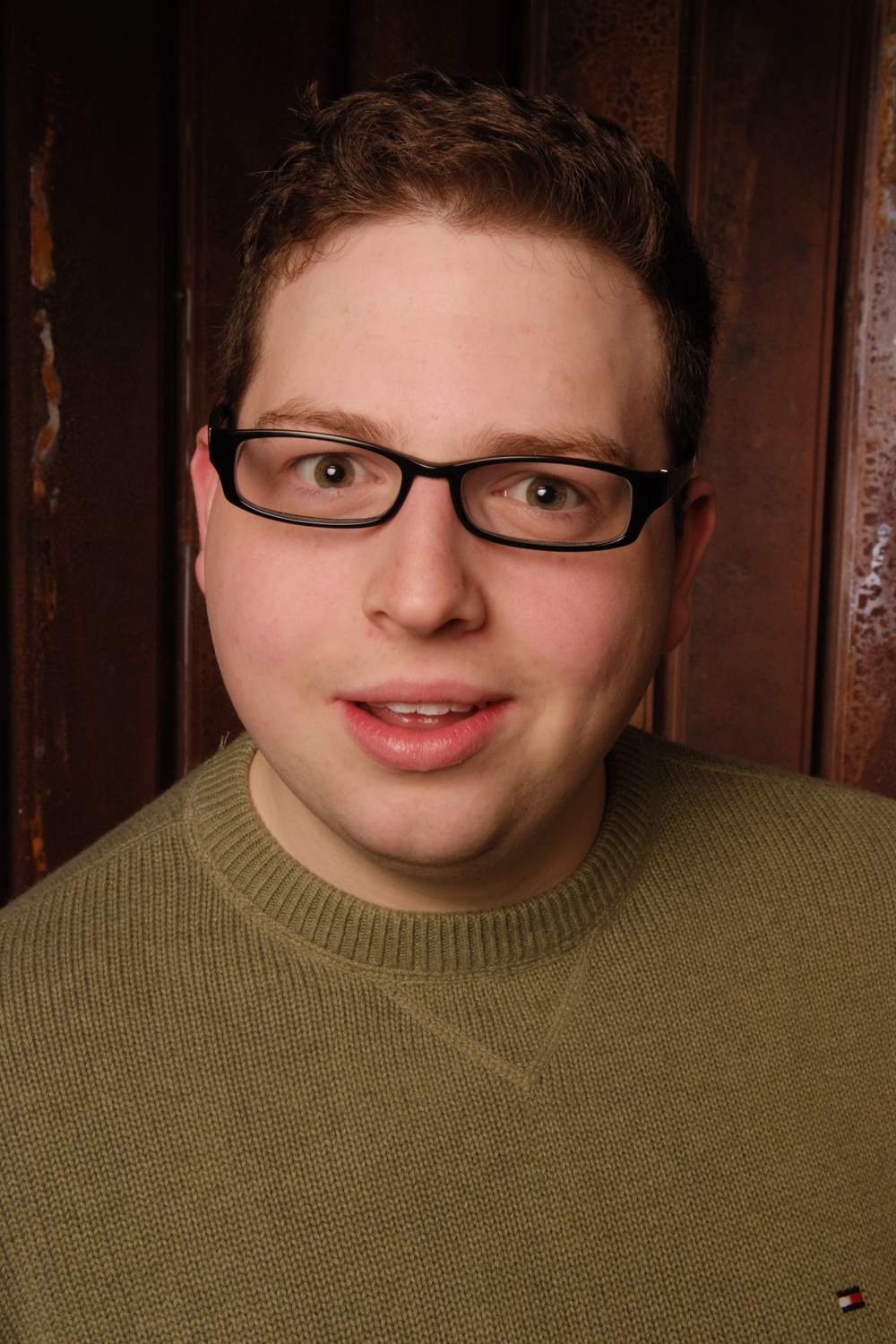
Brandon Hardesty

- Portrayed by Brandon Hardesty
- Appeared in: American Pie Presents: The Book of Love

Marshall "Lube" Lubetsky is a fictional character from the American Pie series of teen comedy films. In class, Lube has a vivid fantasy about a group of cheerleaders, particularly one named Ashley. Lube tells Ashley how he feels about her, giving a speech on how he guarantees sexual satisfaction, but she still turns him down. Ashley's friend is impressed with his promise and tells Lube to meet her upstairs, but when she finds an offensive text on his phone she storms out. Rob finds Heidi in bed with Stifler and leaves the room. The next day, when Rob and Heidi are cleaning the library, Rob finds a secret compartment containing "The Bible". He shows the book to his friends Nathan and Lube and explains that it is a sex manual that has been compiled over 40 years by the students who found it. The book is regarded as legendary, but unfortunately has been damaged by the water. Lube discovers a page in The Bible which tells of a brothel in Canada and a prostitute, Monique, who is very experienced. The entry was written in 1975, but Lube misreads the date as 1995, and they decide to visit. When they meet Monique the boys are disgusted, but Nathan states that they should go for it anyway. Nathan and Lube make Rob go first, but Monique dies while performing oral sex on him. They panic and drive back to the USA. In an attempt to restore The Bible, Rob and his friends resolve to find all of the people who originally wrote it in order to recreate it, starting with the original creator, Noah Levenstein. They eventually succeed in recreating the book. Rob and his friends then go on the school ski trip. Lube and Ashley are riding up the mountain in gondola ski lifts, but Nathan has sex with Dana in the lift control room and accidentally shut off the lifts' power. Ashley and Lube are in another lift, where Lube falls out when trying to go for help. When Ashley climbs down to him, Lube tells her how he really feels about her, moving her to tears. Lube and Ashley also go back to the cabin and have sex.

=== Heidi ===
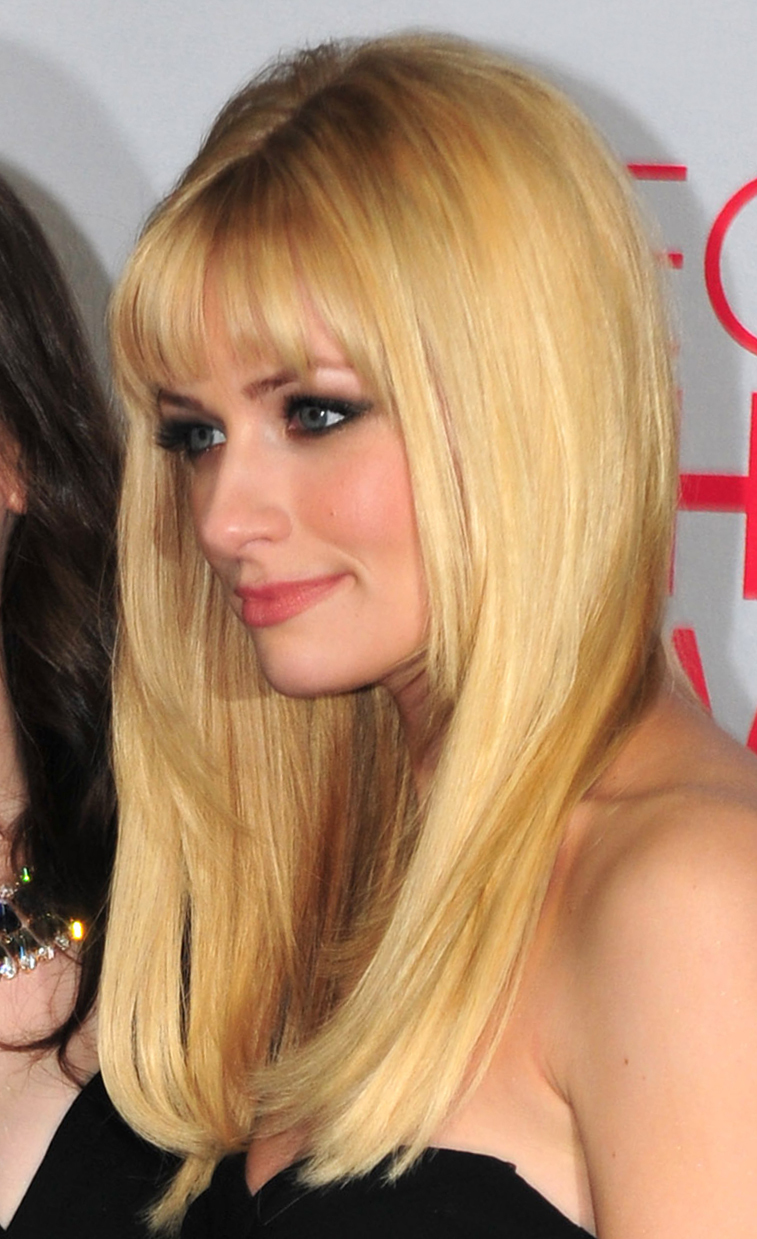
Beth Behrs

- Portrayed by Beth Behrs
- Appeared in: American Pie Presents: The Book of Love

Heidi is a fictional character from the American Pie series of teen comedy films. She is the love interest of Rob, who after he talks to her Stifler states that if Rob doesn't make a move on Heidi, he will. Rob and Heidi meet later in the school library where she discloses that she is a virgin, and wishes to just "get it [sex] over with". Rob attempts to tell Heidi how he feels about her but is interrupted by Nathan and Lube. He eventually finds her in the library about to have sex with another student, and drops a lit candle in a bin in shock. This sets the library on fire, which sets off the water sprinklers. Heidi, Imogen and Dana spectate at a school basketball game where Rob again attempts to tell her how he feels, but is unable to. Rob and Heidi are once again in the library where Rob finally tells her he is attracted to her. Heidi says she feels the same, and they agree to meet at Stifler's party later. At the party Heidi hears Rob shout "Tonight, I'm getting laid!", and runs upstairs. Heidi follows him downstairs, but Rob refuses to talk to her and begins to drink heavily. She later goes on the school ski trip and while there she and Rob are riding up the mountain in gondola ski lifts, but Nathan has sex with Dana in the lift control room and accidentally shut off the lifts' power. Rob and Heidi reconcile and kiss. Heidi and Rob return to the cabin and have sex.

=== Dana ===
- Portrayed by Melanie Papalia
- Appeared in: American Pie Presents: The Book of Love

Dana is a fictional character from the American Pie series of teen comedy films. Dana is the love interest of Nathan and pledges to abstain from sex until marriage despite the fact that she has already slept with six other people. At the school dance, Nathan tries to get to second base with Dana, but only manages to offend her due to her abstinance pledge. Nathan goes to Dana's church service to talk to her, but accidentally broadcasts the explicit and highly personal conversation to the entire congregation on the church's PA system. Dana's father then bans Dana from seeing Nathan. Nathan attempts to reconcile with Dana but offends her, making her leave once again. When on the school ski trip Nathan has sex with Dana in the lift control room.

=== Ashley Lawrence ===
- Portrayed by Jennifer Holland
- Appeared in: American Pie Presents: The Book of Love

Ashley Lawrence is a fictional character from the American Pie series of teen comedy films. She is the love interest of Lube throughout the film. Lube tells her how he feels about her, giving a speech on how he guarantees sexual satisfaction, but she still turns him down. She goes on the school ski trip and while there she is riding up the mountain in gondola ski lift with Lube, but Nathan has sex with Dana in the lift control room and accidentally shut off the lifts' power. Lube falls out when trying to go for help. When Ashley climbs down to him, Lube tells her how he really feels about her, moving her to tears. Lube and Ashley also go back to the cabin and have sex.

=== Imogen ===
- Portrayed by Louisa Lytton
- Appeared in: American Pie Presents: The Book of Love

Imogen is a fictional character from the American Pie series of teen comedy films. She is a friend of Dana and Heidi's and splits from her long-term boyfriend off screen in the film. She later helps Scott after he is raped by a moose and while comforting him he touches her breast, although he tells her it was just reflex.

== Characters from American Pie Presents: Girls' Rules ==
=== Annie Watson ===
- Portrayed by Madison Pettis
- Appeared in: American Pie Presents: Girls' Rules

=== Stephanie Stifler ===
- Portrayed by Lizze Broadway
- Appeared in: American Pie Presents: Girls' Rules

Stephanie Stifler is one of the main protagonists of American Pie Presents: Girls' Rules. Born into the infamous Stifler Family, Stephanie took up the prankster, sex-obsessed personality of her older cousins. Unlike Steve Stifler's role in the original American Pie, Stephanie does not antagonise her friends and seems well-liked and respected amongst East Great Falls. After a pact with her friends, Stephanie decides she would like a friendship rather than just sex. Whilst she begins trying to court new student Grant, she ends up falling for her old friend Emmett, played by Zachary Gordon.

Though Girls' Rules received poor reviews, Lizzie Broadway's portrayal of Stephanie Stifler was regarded as a high point of the film with Flickering Myth describing the character as 'as brash and opinionated as the OG, but with a likable feminist bite'.

=== Kayla ===
- Portrayed by Piper Curda
- Appeared in: American Pie Presents: Girls' Rules

=== Michelle ===
- Portrayed by Natasha Behnam
- Appeared in: American Pie Presents: Girls' Rules
