= Tad Hilgenbrink =

American actor (born 1981)

- Born: 9 October 1981 (age 44)
- Citizenship: Mexico, United States of America
- Education: Quincy Senior High School, Millikin University, and IES London
- Occupation: actor
- Known for: Matt Stifler in American Pie Presents: Band Camp, Chance Marquis in The Curiosity of Chance and Tyler in The Hills Run Red

Tad Hilgenbrink (born October 9, 1981) is an American actor, known for his role as Matt Stifler in American Pie Presents: Band Camp, Chance Marquis in The Curiosity of Chance and Tyler in The Hills Run Red.

== Early life and career ==
Hilgenbrink is of Mexican and American descent. Attended Quincy Senior High School, where he was actively involved in music and theater. He performed as part of the resident company for summer 2003 at Music Theatre of Wichita in Wichita, Kansas, where he performed in the musicals Footloose, Oklahoma!, Good News, Chicago, and The Scarlet Pimpernel. He has a BFA in musical theatre and a minor in dance from Millikin University and IES London. While at Millikin he spent his summers at the Little Theatre on the Square in Sullivan, Illinois, as a performing intern.

== Later career ==
He has performed in roles such as the Artful Dodger in Oliver!, Gideon in Seven Brides for Seven Brothers, and Chuck Cranston in Footloose. He polished his creative craft, studying Shakespeare intensively in London and has starred in multiple theatrical pieces including A Midsummer Night's Dream, Chicago, and Oliver!. After many successful performances in New York and London, he ventured to Los Angeles giving himself only two weeks to make it or go home. After winning his first major roles as well as the Showcase on The Price Is Right, he decided to stay.

He was chosen for Matt Stifler due to his resemblance to Seann William Scott, replacing Eli Marienthal who portrayed the character in the primary American Pie series. He also appeared in the 2006 film The Curiosity of Chance, a movie in which he stars as a gay high school student who moved to a new school and must learn to fit in.

== Filmography ==
=== Film ===
Year	Title	Role	Notes
2005	American Pie Presents: Band Camp	Matt Stifler	Credited as Tad Hilgenbrinck
2006	The Curiosity of Chance	Chance Marquis	Credited as Tad Hilgenbrinck
2007	Epic Movie	Cyclops	Credited as Tad Hilgenbrinck
2007	Grave Situations	Samuel Van Alden	
2008	Sherman's Way	Taylor	
2008	Lost Boys: The Tribe	Chris Emerson	Credited as Tad Hilgenbrinck
2008	Disaster Movie	Prince Edwin	
2008	Amusement	Rob Alerbe	Credited as Tad Hilgenbrinck
2009	The Last Low Tide	Ian	
2009	H2O Extreme	CC	
2009	The Hills Run Red	Tyler	Credited as Tad Hilgenbrinck
2010	Five Star Day	Darren	

=== Television ===
Year	Title	Role	Notes
2004	It's All Relative	Young Wayne	Episode: "Cross My Heart"
