= Curt Hahn =

American film director

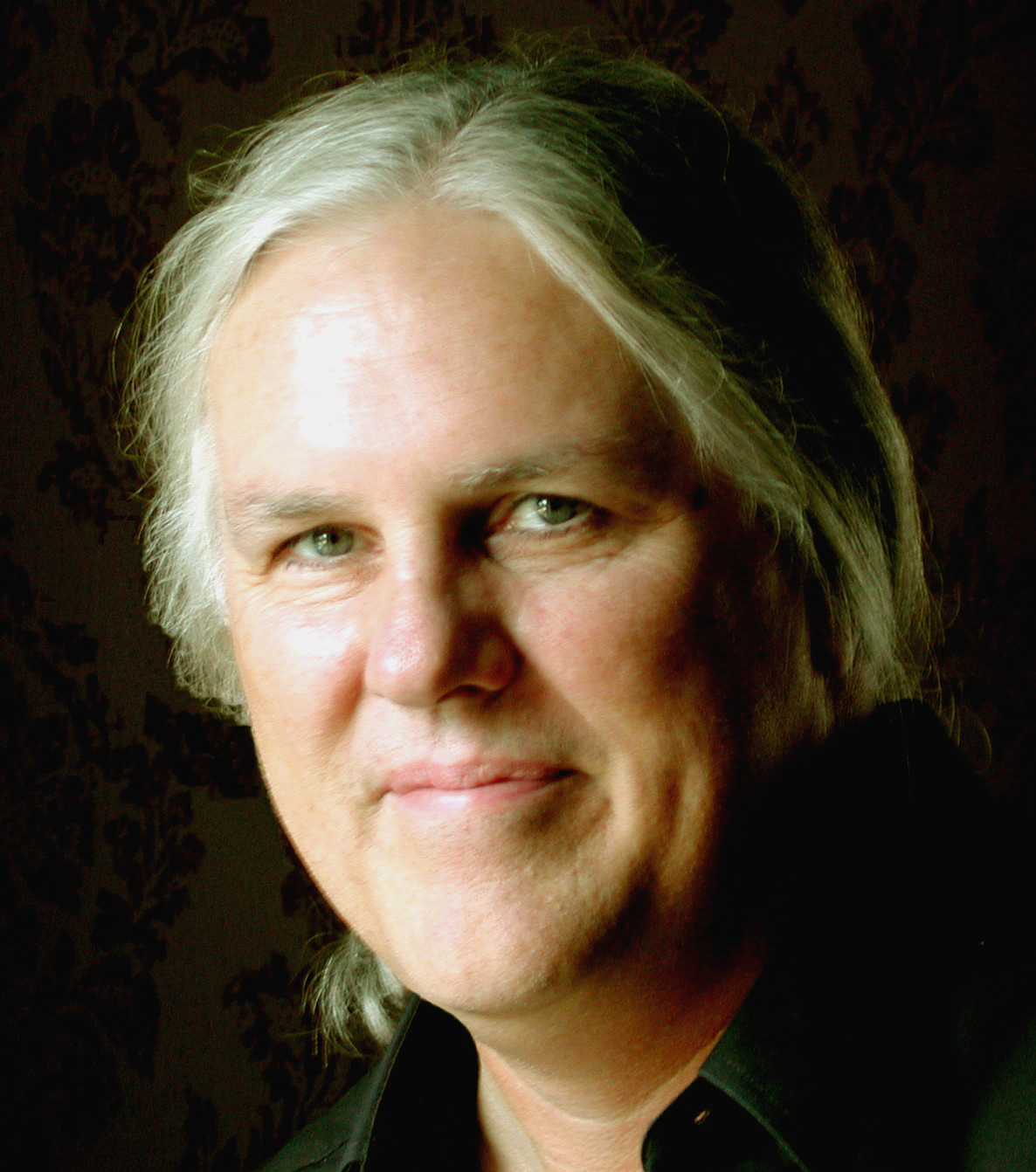
- Born: April 21, 1949 (age 77)
- Education: Phillips Exeter Academy; Washington University in St. Louis; California Institute of the Arts
- Occupations: filmmaker; entrepreneur
- Notable work: No Regrets (2004); Deadline (2012 film)
- Title: WTVI-TV (Director); Walter J. Klein Company, Ltd. (Director); Film House (Founder)

Curt Hahn (born April 21, 1949) is a filmmaker and entrepreneur best known for his feature films No Regrets (2004) and Deadline (2012). Hahn is a pioneer of intelligent independent filmmaking who works outside the Hollywood studio system.

== Transcendent ==
In 2003, Hahn founded Transcendent to produce high quality independent features. Transcendent's first project No Regrets (2004), starring Janine Turner and Kate Jackson, was written, produced and directed by Hahn and released worldwide.

In 2006, Transcendent co-produced Two Weeks starring two time Academy Award winner Sally Field, Ben Chaplin and Tom Cavanagh, with writer-director Steve Stockman. The film was shot in Nashville. Worldwide rights were acquired by Metro-Goldwyn-Mayer which released the film theatrically and on DVD.

Next, Hahn produced and directed Deadline, starring Steve Talley and Academy Award nominee Eric Roberts. Deadline is adapted from Mark Ethridge's novel Grievances. Filming took place in middle Tennessee in January and February 2011. It was released in theaters nationwide in 2012 beginning with its world premiere in Nashville on February 15. Deadline was released domestically on DVD and Video on Demand on July 17, 2012. Foreign distribution is handled by Curb Entertainment, which is releasing Deadline worldwide.
