= Deadline (2012 film) =

2012 American mystery drama film directed by Curt Hahn

- Deadline film poster
- Directed by: Curt Hahn
- Screenplay by: Mark Ethridge
- Based on: Grievances by Mark Ethridge
- Produced by: Molly M. Mayeux; Curt Hahn
- Starring: Eric Roberts; Steve Talley; Anna Felix; Lauren Jenkins; JD Souther; David Dwyer; Jeremy Childs
- Cinematography: Paul Marschall
- Edited by: Robert Gordon
- Music by: Dave Perkins
- Production company: Transcendent
- Distributed by: Freestyle Releasing (U.S.); Curb Entertainment (International)
- Release date: February 15, 2012 (Nashville, Tennessee)
- Running time: 95 minutes
- Country: United States
- Language: English

Deadline is a 2012 American mystery drama film directed by Curt Hahn. The screenplay was written by former Charlotte Observer managing editor Mark Ethridge, basing it upon his novel Grievances, which was inspired by actual events. The film stars Steve Talley and Academy Award nominee Eric Roberts.

== Synopsis ==
Deadline is the story of the murder of an African American youth in rural Alabama that has gone uninvestigated, unsolved, and unpunished for almost twenty years. That changes when Nashville Times reporter Matt Harper (Steve Talley) meets an idealistic young blueblood bent on discovering the truth. Harper undertakes the investigation despite the opposition of his publisher, violent threats from mysterious forces, a break-up with his fiancée, and his father's cancer diagnosis.

== Plot ==
Young newspaper reporter Matt Harper (Steve Talley) is dispatched from Nashville to cover the murder of the police chief of Amos, Alabama. There he meets Trey Hall (Lauren Jenkins), a 21-year-old "blue blood" who lives on her family's hunting plantation. She wants Matt to investigate the nearly 20-year-old unsolved killing of a black teenager, Wallace Sampson (Romonte Hamer). Matt believes solving the murder will jump-start his career, and he begins to investigate. Being distracted, he forgets an appointment related to his upcoming wedding, which causes his fiancée Delana Calhoun (Anna Felix) to call off their engagement.

Matt asks his editor, Walker Burns (Jeremy Childs), to let him look into the murder. While Burns notes that Matt is already on thin ice with the publisher (David Ditmore) for a lack of productivity, Burns allows Matt some time to investigate, on the condition that politically incorrect reporter Ronnie Bullock (Eric Roberts) accompany him.

Matt and Ronnie discover old police files that point to a Klansman who operated 'The Store' near where the shooting occurred. The day before Wallace's murder, someone had attempted to firebomb 'The Store' during a civil rights protest. Just as the two reporters are making headway, Matt's ex-fiancée Delana tells Matt his father, Lucas (JD Souther), has cancer. Matt and Delana visit Matt's father, but later fight because Matt hasn't told his father about the broken engagement and because Matt is critical of his ill father.

Matt and Bullock continue investigating without the publisher's knowledge. One of their sources, Wallace's mother Mary Pell Sampson (Jackie Welch), is reluctant to talk to them, and Matt begs Delana to help him in speaking to the woman. Delana reluctantly agrees, not for Matt, but because she dislikes someone getting away with murder. Mary Pell tells Delana that 'The Store' was firebombed because it was a front for prostitution.

The publisher discovers that Matt and Bullock are continuing to work on the story against his orders. After a public confrontation in which Matt challenges the publisher, Matt seeks his father's help. Using his father's advice, Matt and Bullock subvert the publisher and renew the investigation. They ask Delana to help with the interview of Wallace's girlfriend Vanessa (Maisha Dyson), and Delana again becomes part of the team. Vanessa reveals a crucial clue about someone running from the scene. Matt and Bullock discover that Judge Buchanan (Tommy Cresswell) owned the store that was firebombed.

Somebody in a car tries to run Delana off the road when she leaves Amos, but she escapes. Matt realizes how much Delana means to him and rushes to comfort her. He delivers a full and complete apology for his self-centered behavior.

Matt and Bullock track down the man running from the scene, Billy ‘Possum’ Baker (Clay Brocker). They learn he's been an anti-Klan informer and is still undercover. Baker is now dying, and he is no longer worried about the consequences of coming forward with the truth.

Just as they publish the story, Matt's father dies. Matt arrives in time to make his peace and to hear the words of approval he's always craved. When Matt has to choose between doing the right thing and doing the professional thing, he makes the right choice, and Delana falls back in love with him.

Matt and Bullock's story leads to indictments. Evidence proves the same gun that killed Wallace Sampson also killed the police chief. The reporters foil an attempt on Possum's life the night before a hearing where everything is made clear and Mary Pell reveals a final shocking truth about the killer that leaves everyone gasping.

The reporters receive a prize for investigative reporting. The town of Amos is transformed. Matt Harper has become a reporter with a conscience and someone who finally deserves Delana.

== Cast ==
- Eric Roberts as Ronnie Bullock
- Steve Talley as Matt Harper
- Anna Felix as Delana Calhoun
- Lauren Jenkins as Trey Hall
- Jackie Welch as Mary Pell Sampson
- JD Souther as Lucas Harper
- David Dwyer as Everett Hall
- Jeremy Childs as Walker Burns
- Darryl Van Leer as Reverend Young
- Maisha Dyson as Vanessa Brown
- Devante Linville as Wallace Brown
- Tommy Cresswell as Judge Rutledge Buchanan
- Clay Brocker as Billy 'Possum' Baker
- Joe T. Blankenship as Olen Perringer Jr.
- David Ditmore as Warren Baxter
- Jenny Littleton as Patty Paysinger
- Romonte Hamer as Wallace Sampson
- Tucker Perry as Young Vanessa Brown
- Larry Woods as Max McCallum
- Bryce Martin as Court Observer
- D'Army Bailey as Judge Williams
- Denice Hicks as Dr. Deborah Wright
- Amelia Hahn as Emma Jean Thornton
- Kennedi Hall as Ella Churchwell
- Genma Holmes as Possum's Wife
- Jessejames Locorriere as Earl Thornton
- Ian Quinn as Defense Attorney
- Yuri Cunza as Bailiff
- Salim Husari as mechanic 1
- Hunter Atkins (a Nashville banker and an investor in the film) as Ray

== Production ==
Deadline was shot in the Nashville, Tennessee area. Sites include the Rippavilla Plantation, in Spring Hill and at the Gannett-owned newspaper The Tennessean.

== Release ==
Deadline premiered in Nashville, hosted by The Tennessean on Wednesday, February 15. Over 1,000 turned out for the premiere at the Regal Green Hills Theater, which included a red carpet event with the cast and filmmakers.

On February 21, The Charlotte Observer hosted the next in a series of premieres. The cast and filmmakers then toured 44 more cities where newspapers such as The Miami Herald, The Atlanta Journal-Constitution, The Houston Chronicle, The Detroit Free Press and The Chicago Sun-Times hosted a premiere in their city to benefit a local non-profit. The premiere tour included Kentucky's Paramount Arts Center Theatre. The eighty-year-old historically preserved Paramount is considered a crown jewel of America's remaining original grand film houses and seats 1,400. Friday, April 13, 2012 Deadline opened in theaters nationwide.

Deadline was released domestically on DVD and Video on Demand on July 17, 2012. Foreign distribution is handled by Curb Entertainment, which is releasing Deadline worldwide.

Deadline had a private screening at the APME Conference in Denver, Colorado in September, 2011.

== Reception ==
Movie critic Roger Ebert rated the film 2 stars out of 4, describing the plot as "underwhelming."
