= Manuel Cuevas =

Mexican fashion designer (born 1933)

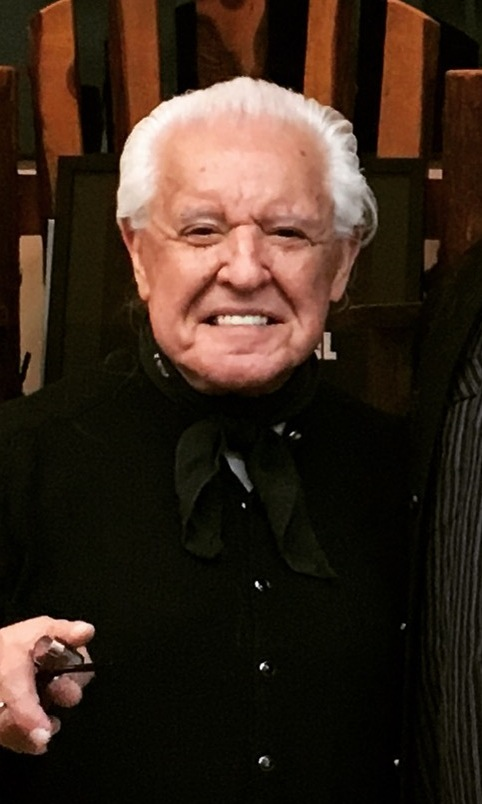
- Cuevas in January 2016
- Born: Manuel Arturo José Cuevas Martínez Sr. April 23, 1933 (age 93); Coalcomán, Michoacán, Mexico
- Education: University of Guadalajara
- Occupation: Designer
- Years active: 1951–present
- Spouse: Maria Salinas Del Carmen (2014-)
- Children: 3

Manuel Arturo José Cuevas Martínez Sr. (born April 23, 1933 in Coalcomán Michoacán) is a Mexican fashion designer best known for the garments he created for prominent rock and roll and country music acts.

== Early life ==
Manuel Arturo José Cuevas Martínez was born on April 23, 1933, in Coalcomán de Vázquez Pallares in Mexico as the fifth of 11 children of Esperanza Martínez (1911) and José Guadalupe Cuevas (1901). He attended the University of Guadalajara and majored in psychology.

Cuevas first learned how to sew in 1945 from his older brother, Adolfo, in Coalcoman. He stated, "I started making prom dresses when I was 13. You know that grandmothers and aunts made the prom dresses for all the kids, but I started making prom dresses that were pretty expensive, and all the girls said, 'Mommy I don't want you to make my prom dress. I want Manuel to make my prom dress!' I continued making prom dresses and in one year I made 77 dresses, then the next year I made 110, and from then on, I hired people to help me sew. I made a fortune."

== Los Angeles ==
After success in making prom dresses in Mexico, Cuevas moved to Los Angeles in 1951 and worked for several tailors. He was soon referred to and started working for Sy Devore, tailor to the Rat Pack. Cuevas was offered $55 a fitting, which would often only take 15 minutes. Soon, he was tailoring suits for elite members of the Los Angeles community, including Frank Sinatra, Sammy Davis Jr., Dean Martin, Bob Hope, Don Rickles, and Joey Bishop.

Not long after starting to work with Sy Devore, Cuevas attended the Pasadena Tournament of the Roses (commonly known as the Rose Parade). He was inspired by the elaborate and flamboyant clothing. Upon learning that the pieces were designed by Nathan Turk, Cuevas visited the designer to ask him who was responsible for the embroidery on his clothing. The embroidery was created by master tailor Viola Grae. While still working as the fitter at Sy Devore's, Cuevas bartered his sewing expertise with Grae, saying he would cut the shirts and pants for her in return for teaching him the craft of embroidery.

Through Grae, Cuevas met Nudie Cohn, famous for his grand, rhinestone-embellished "Nudie suits". At first, Cuevas made shirts for Cohn. Actor Audie Murphy came into Nudie's Rodeo Tailors one day about the fit of some the suits that were being made for his latest film, concerned whether they would be done in time for filming Monday. Cuevas worked all weekend tailoring the suits, and Monday morning delivered all the outfits to Murphy. Cohn then offered Cuevas a full-time job. Working alongside Cohn, Cuevas later became head tailor, head designer, and eventually partner of Nudie's Rodeo Tailors in North Hollywood.

Clients knew Cuevas as the quiet tailor in the back at Nudie's, who also did all of the fittings. Cuevas designed and created many of the suits for which Nudie's Rodeo Tailors became famous in the late '50s, '60s, and early '70s. Though Cohn encouraged Cuevas to make repeat "copies" of designs that sold well, Cuevas refused. At Nudie's Rodeo Tailors, Cuevas became known for his one-of-a-kind designs, making each piece unique.

In September 1965, Cuevas married Nudie's only daughter, Barbara L. Cohn. They had one daughter, Morelia (born in 1968). In 1975, after Manuel and Barbara were divorced, Cuevas opened his own shop, Manuel Couture, just down the street from Nudie's Rodeo Tailors in North Hollywood. Many of the friends and clients that Cuevas made while working with Nudie, including Johnny Cash, Marty Stuart, and George Jones, supported Cuevas and his new shop.

From 1975 till 1988, Manuel Couture became a go-to designer and image maker for up-and-coming musicians in Los Angeles. "His customers seem to place a near-blind faith in Manuel putting their professional images in his hands, believing that what he whips up for them will be right. 'That's partly why I have survived as a designer all these years. People put their trust in me to create something truly unique,' he says." Throughout his North Hollywood career, Cuevas worked with famed costumer Edith Head and made costumes for over 90 movies and 13 television shows, including the jeans James Dean wore in the movie Giant, and the Lone Ranger's famous mask.

== Nashville ==
After nearly 40 years in Los Angeles, Cuevas moved his business and family (second wife Susan, and three children Morelia, Manny Jr., and Jesse-Justin) to Nashville, Tennessee. "I wanted to see the kids grow healthy and safe, and LA started to get a little too tight for me, and too complicated. I am thankful for my time there, though, because that was the place where I made my career flourish."

Cuevas's new design space (located at 1922 Broadway) was as equally historical as his designs. An old Victorian house near Nashville's Music Row, it was four stories; three were designated for work space, with the main floor designated as a showroom and retail space. While in Nashville, with encouragement from the public, Cuevas became interested in designing for the everyday client. In 1989, with the popularity of the California Jacket worn by long-time friend and client Dwight Yoakam, Cuevas offered a limited-edition, similar version of the Hillbilly Deluxe jacket in his Nashville showroom.

After moving to Nashville, in the late 1990s, Cuevas began creating his 50-State Jacket Collection as his gift back to the United States. He researched details from each of the 50 states to create the one-of-a-kind collection, which debuted in 2005 at the Frist Center for the Visual Arts in Nashville. Cuevas says the goal was to eventually donate each state's jacket to that state's museum after it has toured the United States and internationally as a collection.

In 2005, in an effort to design for the "average Joe", Cuevas worked with his son, Manny Jr., to create a men's and women's luxury, ready-to-wear clothing line featured at New York Fashion Week in 2006. The limited-piece collection was manufactured in Italy and was the first and only time that Cuevas produced any clothing outside of the United States.

After 25 years at 1922 Broadway, Cuevas moved closer to downtown Nashville. Manuel American Designs opened its new 3,100-square-foot retail space located at the corner of 8th and Broadway, in September 2013.

On January 24, 2014, Cuevas and Maria Salinas Del Carmen were married at the Davidson County Courthouse. It was Cuevas's fourth marriage.

In 2019, Cuevas was honored in an exhibit called American Currents: The Music of 2018, presented at the Country Music Hall of Fame in Nashville.

== Client list ==
Cuevas's client list includes Hank Williams, Waylon Jennings, Porter Wagoner, John Wayne, Clayton Moore (the Lone Ranger), Dwight Eisenhower, Elvis Presley, Little Jimmy Dickens, John Lennon, Loretta Lynn, George Jones, Glen Campbell, Ernest Tubb, Gene Autry, the Osmonds, David Cassidy, Bobby Sherman, Dolly Parton, Linda Ronstadt, Emmylou Harris, Roy Rogers, Neil Young, Elton John, The Grateful Dead, The Rolling Stones, Bob Dylan, George H. Bush, George W. Bush, the Bee Gees, Janis Joplin, Jimi Hendrix, Catherine Bach (Daisy Duke), The Jackson Five, John Travolta (Urban Cowboy), Robert Redford (The Electric Horseman), Robert Taylor, Marlon Brando, Burt Reynolds, Raquel Welch, David Lee Roth, Clint Eastwood in Sergio Leone's Dollars Trilogy of spaghetti Westerns (A Fistful of Dollars, For a Few Dollars More, and The Good, the Bad and the Ugly), Jack Nicholson, Sylvester Stallone, Mike Mills, Shooter Jennings, Kid Rock, The Killers, Jack White, Kenny Chesney, Randy Travis, Alan Jackson, Tim McGraw, Keith Urban, Zac Brown Band, Miranda Lambert, Jon Pardi, Frankie Ballard, Ozzy Osbourne, and countless others.

== Notable clients ==
"Record companies call me to help fabricate personalities for their artists ... I do for artists what they need, not what they think they need."

=== Salvador Dalí ===
Cuevas designed a shirt for famed artist Salvador Dalí, while working with Viola Grae. Upon receiving the shirt, Dalí looked in the mirror and said, "What kind of flower is this?" Manuel said, "That is a Hispanic flower." Dalí knew Cuevas was kidding and said, "I've got to do something for you." He then scribbled a drawing of the two of them as they stood in front of the mirror, and Dalí then gave the original piece of art to Cuevas as an impromptu gift.

=== Johnny Cash ===
Cuevas is attributed as being the man who put Johnny Cash in black. It was early 1956, and Johnny Cash was just about to go on tour. He called Cuevas and said, "I would like to have nine new suits." Three months later, Cash called Cuevas and said, "I got the suits I ordered from you." "Good," Cuevas said. "Are they all right?" Cash paused. "How come they're all black?" "They're all black," Manuel said, "but they're not all the same style, you know." "Yes," Cash said. "So?" "So, OK, let's try it." Cash tried it and kept ordering from Cuevas for 40 years. "I want four of this, four of that, but you..." Cash would say. "You know what?" Cuevas responded. "Black," Cash stated.

=== Marty Stuart ===
Longtime friend and client Marty Stuart made his first pilgrimage to Hollywood and Nudie's in 1974. He said he'd saved up $250 and was intending on buying an outfit. When he tried on a jacket that he liked, Nudie calmly informed him it that it cost $2500. Then Cuevas stepped in. "He said," Stuart remembered, "'Someday, you will walk in here and buy the whole store. But today you get a free shirt."

Not only has Marty Stuart purchased countless Cuevas suits, but he has also one of the largest and most significant collections of country music memorabilia aside from the Country Music Hall of Fame and Museum in Nashville. The collection includes his personal Cuevas suits, along with the Cuevas suits, Nudie suits, and Nathan Turk suits that were worn by some of country music's most influential musicians.

=== Dwight Yoakam ===
Cuevas and Dwight Yoakam collaborated for about 15 years to come up with his signature "Hillbilly Deluxe" look, featuring low-slung, tight-fitting jeans and sparkling, arrow-stitched, embroidered jackets. "In Dwight's case, he is no dummy, he knows exactly what he wants." Cuevas says. "He said he wanted some of those short jackets from the '50s, the boleros, so I made him one of those. We got about 3,000 calls for that jacket, they have become very popular again. He has a great respect for his older peers, like Buck Owens, Hank Williams Sr., and Ernest Tubb, so this 'new style' of his is a blend of the retro and the new. "I can't say enough good things about Dwight." Likewise, Yoakam says: "Manuel always sets aside his ego and lets me be a part of the creative process. I'll talk about what I like, and he'll sketch it. He never copies; everything's an original. I still wear the hat he blocked for me 10 years ago. It has become a good luck hat."

=== Elvis Presley ===
In the late 1950s, Colonel Parker brought in $10,000 and a young man into Nudie's Rodeo Tailors, requesting that Nudie make something special for him. Elvis' signature gold lamé suit was created. On the day Elvis and Colonel Parker came to pick up the suit, Cuevas is quoted as saying, "I wasn't thinking and thought I must press the suit and since it was a gold lamé, it wrinkled like the face of a modern Keith Richards." When asked for new concert wear for Elvis Presley, Cuevas asked for a demonstration of his stage moves. After watching much hip shaking and thrusting, Cuevas confessed he thought, "Oh God, I don't know what I'm going to do. But then I had the idea to make a jumpsuit. Elvis said, "What is this? Overalls? But then he put it on..."

=== Gram Parsons ===
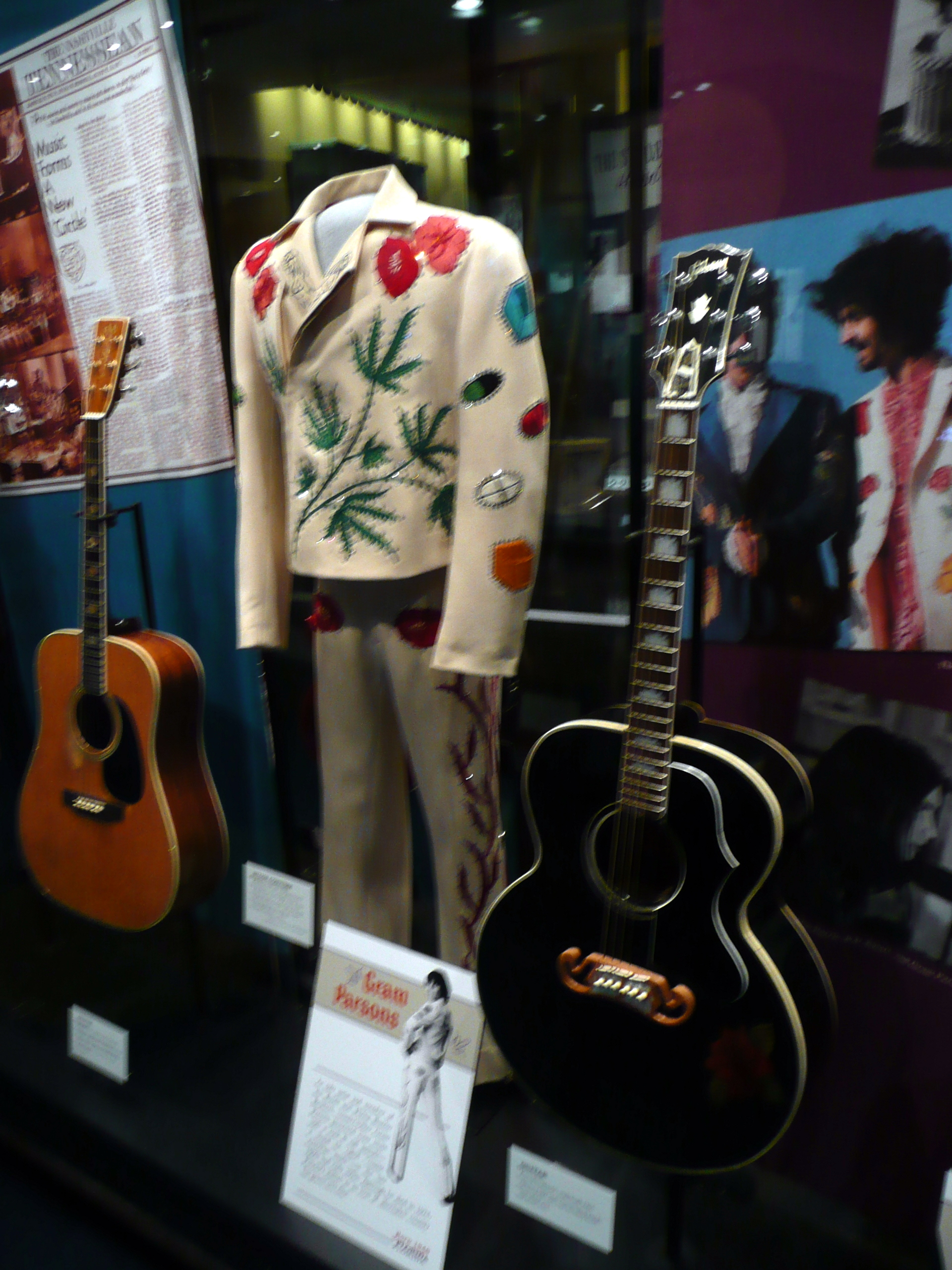
Gram Parsons's suit in the Country Music Hall of Fame.

For The Flying Burrito Brothers' 1969 The Gilded Palace of Sin album cover, Gram Parsons commissioned Nudie and Cuevas to create a suit. Visible on one lapel is the embroidered figure of a voluptuous naked woman. The green leaves featured prominently in the design on the front of the jacket are a marijuana plant, and the red-petaled flowers above them are poppies, the natural source of morphine, opium, and heroin.

The suit has been continuously linked to the manner of his death. Parsons was 26 years old at the time of his death, with official cause being an overdose of morphine and alcohol. Cuevas has been quoted as saying, "Gram and I discussed his suit in detail for several months before I committed it to fabric. It wasn't until years later looking back that I realized he wanted me to design the suit the way he would want to die. From the pills, the woman, the cross, the poppies to the flames on the pants and of course in the end his body went up in flames in Joshua Tree with our friend Phil Kaufman."

== Awards ==
- 2018 National Heritage Fellowship awarded by the National Endowment for the Arts, which is the United States government's highest honor in the folk and traditional arts.
- 2015 "NAHCC's Outstanding Leadership in Arts & Culture Award" to MANUEL, Presented by the Nashville Area Hispanic Chamber of Commerce (NAHCC) during its Annual Hispanic Heritage Month Gala at Waller.
- 2014 Father of the Year Honoree, Nashville, TN Presented by the Father's Day Council; June 2014
- 2013 Creativity Achievement Award, Morelia Michoacan, Mexico Presented by the La Voz; June 2013
- 2012 Lifetime Achievement Award, Morelia Michoacan, Mexico Presented by President Felipe Calderon Hinojosa of Mexico; September 2012
- 2011 Best in Show, Pedestal Piece, Cody, Wyoming Presented by the Cody Country Chamber of Commerce; September 2011
- 2009 "Hispanic Entrepreneur Lifetime Achievement Award" presented to Manuel Cuevas, owner and founder of Manuel American Designs of Nashville Tennessee presented by the Nashville Area Hispanic Chamber of Commerce at Nashville Public Television (NPT) studios.
- 2008 Cody High Style Award, Cody, Wyoming Presented by the Cody Country Chamber of Commerce; September 2008
- 2006 Country Music Association Recognition, Nashville, TN Presented by the Country Music Association
- 2005 Tennessee State Museum Costume and Textile Institute Inductee, Nashville, TN Presented by the Tennessee State Museum Costume and Textile Institute, 2005
- 2003 HELO Appreciation Award, Washington DC Presented by the National League of Cities Congress of Cities; December 2003
- 2003 Achievement in the Arts, Nashville, TN Presented by the Tennessee Hispanic Chamber
- 1996 "Intercoiffure" American Design Award Presented by the Intercoiffure America/Canada
- 1992 MODA Award, Washington DC Presented by the Hispanic Designers, INC

=== Notable achievements ===
- Lifetime Achievement Award, Nashville, TN Presented by the Music City Fashion Council
- Star on the Music City Walk of Fame, Nashville, TN Presented by Nashville Convention and Visitors Bureau Foundation Music City Inc. and Metro Parks, November 2011
- May 5: Manuel Day, Franklin, TN Presented by the Historic City of Franklin, Tennessee, May 5, 2011
- June 12: Manuel Day, Nashville, TN Presented by the City of Nashville, Tennessee, June 12, 2011
- Best Living Western Men's Fashion Designer: Readers' Choice, Nashville, TN Presented by True West Magazine; 2011
- Lifetime Achievement Award, Los Angeles, CA Presented by the City of Lost Angeles; December 2010
- Senate Joint Resolution NO. 998, State of Tennessee Presented by the Tennessee Senate, May 17, 2006
