= Hole in one (disambiguation) =

A hole in one is a golf shot where a player hits the ball directly from the tee into the cup with one shot.

Hole in one may also refer to:

- A Hole in One, a 2004 film with Michelle Williams and Meat Loaf, set in the 1950s with lobotomy in the plot
- Hole in One (2010 film), a 2010 comedy film with golf in the plot
- "Hole in One" (Only Fools and Horses), an episode of BBC sitcom Only Fools and Horses
- "Hole in One" (The Price Is Right), a segment game from the American TV series The Price Is Right
- "Hole in One", a song by Gotthard from the album G.
