= Agent Recon =

2024 action film by Derek Ting

- Promotional release poster
- Directed by: Derek Ting
- Written by: Derek Ting
- Produced by: Derek Ting; Joyce Yung
- Starring: Derek Ting; Marc Singer; Chuck Norris; Sylvia Kwan; Jason Scott Jenkins; Matthew Ryan Burnett; Nikki Leigh; Christopher Showerman
- Cinematography: Zach Trout
- Edited by: Chris Damadyan
- Music by: Adam Bosarge
- Production company: Random Art Workshop
- Distributed by: Quiver Distribution
- Release date: June 21, 2024
- Running time: 85 minutes
- Country: United States
- Language: English

Agent Recon is a 2024 American science fiction action film written, directed, and co-produced by Derek Ting. The film stars Ting, Marc Singer and Chuck Norris.

The film was Norris's first film role since The Expendables 2 (2012) and the last released before his death in March 2026, and was released in the United States on June 21, 2024.

== Cast ==
- Derek Ting as Jim Yung
- Marc Singer as Colonel Green
- Chuck Norris as Captain Alastair
- Sylvia Kwan as Tanya
- Jason Scott Jenkins as Miller
- Matthew Ryan Burnett as Aaron Klak
- Nikki Leigh as Captain Lila Rupert
- Christopher Showerman as Doctor Penn / Alpha

== Production ==
In October 2023, it was revealed that an action science fiction film titled Agent Recon had completed principal photography with Derek Ting directing, writing, and starring in it. Marc Singer, Chuck Norris, Sylvia Kwan, Jason Scott Jenkins, Matthew Ryan Burnett, Nikki Leigh, and Christopher Showerman rounded out the cast.

== Release ==
=== Streaming ===
Agent Recon was released in the United States by Quiver Distribution on June 21, 2024.
