= Mark Ethridge =

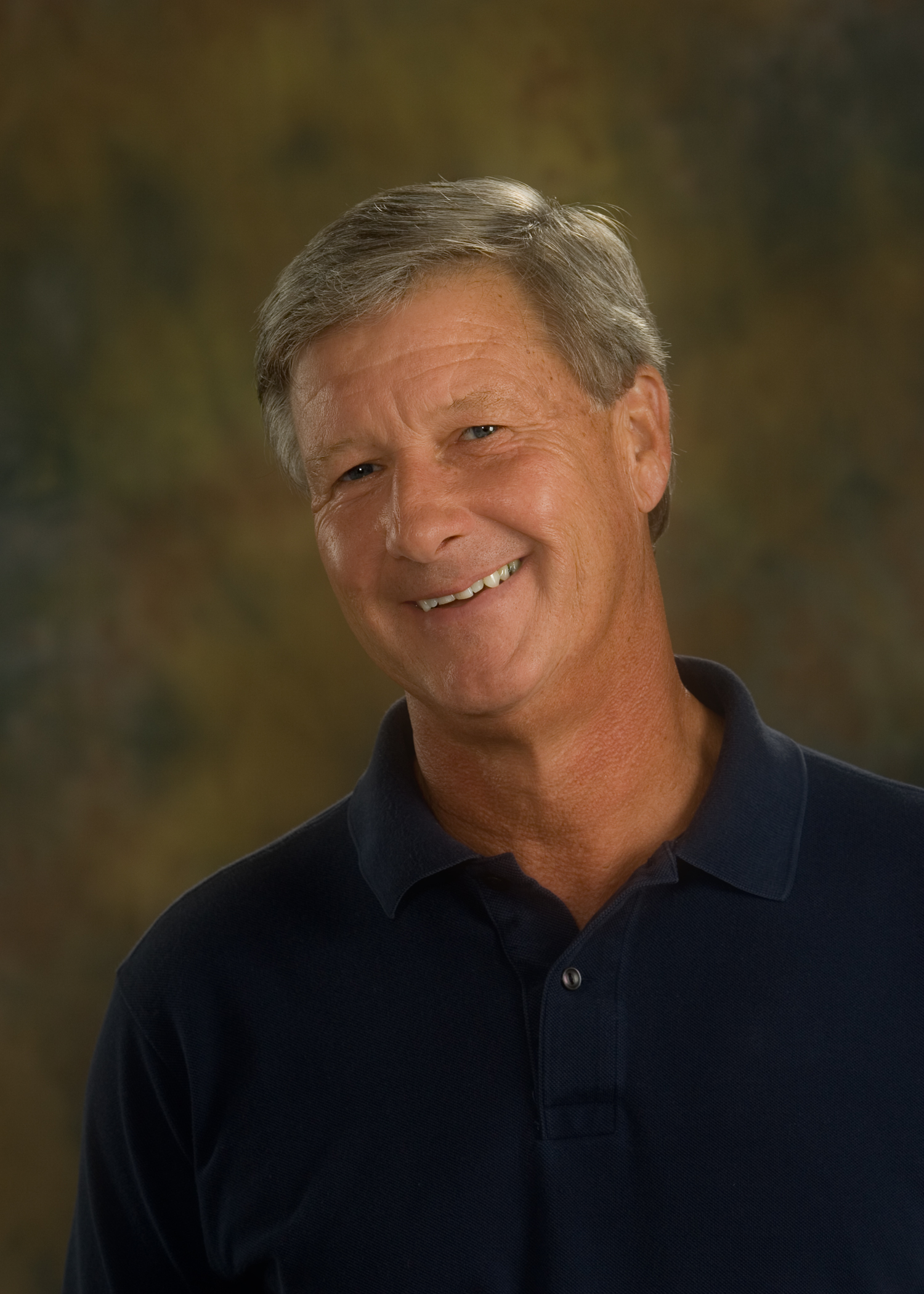
- Mark Ethridge
- Born: May 28, 1949 (age 77); Winston-Salem, NC, United States
- Occupations: Novelist, screenwriter
- Writing career
- Genres: Mystery, Thriller

Mark Ethridge (born May 28, 1949) is a novelist, screenwriter, and communications consultant. His novel Grievances was released in 2006, and adapted into the 2012 film Deadline. A native of Winston-Salem, North Carolina, he attended Phillips Exeter Academy and graduated cum laude from Princeton University in 1971 with a degree in history. In 1985–86 he was a Nieman Fellow at Harvard University. Ethridge has been married since c. 1972. He has two grown children.

== Writing career ==
Ethridge began as a reporter for the Associated Press, worked as a reporter and editor at The Charlotte Observer and was managing editor from 1979 to 1988. He played a key role in the newsroom's two Pulitzer Prizes for Public Service – for an investigation of brown lung disease and for the PTL scandal.

From 1989 to 1998, Ethridge was president and publisher of The Business Journal of Charlotte. He supervised a number of other business journals across the country and several publications devoted to NASCAR racing for Newhouse/Advance.

In 1998, Ethridge became president and part-owner of The Cotter Group, a NASCAR-based sports public relations and marketing agency based in Harrisburg, North Carolina, which became a part of Clear Channel Communications in 2000.

He was president of Carolina Parenting, Inc. which publishes Charlotte Parent magazine and the parenting magazines in Greensboro/Winston-Salem/High Point and Raleigh/Durham/Chapel Hill from 1990 to 2014.

His first novel, Grievances, was published in May 2006 by NewSouth Books. Deadline, a movie version for which he wrote the screenplay, premiered in 2012.

His second novel, Fallout, was published in February 2012 by NewSouth Books.

== Published works ==
- "Grievances" (2006)
- "Fallout" (2012)

== Film adaptations ==
- Deadline (2012)
