= Christopher Showerman =

American actor (born 1971)

- Born: Christopher Clare Showerman; June 24, 1971 (age 55); Stockbridge, Michigan, U.S.
- Occupations: Actor, producer
- Years active: 1997–present
- Spouse: Kimberly Showerman
- Children: 2 daughters
- Website: christophershowerman.com

Christopher Clare Showerman (born June 24, 1971) is an American actor, best known for his role as George in George of the Jungle 2 (2003).

== Early life ==
Showerman was born in Jackson, Michigan on June 24, 1971 and raised in Stockbridge, Michigan, attending Stockbridge High School. He is of Dutch descent.

Showerman embarked on an acting career after attending Michigan State University, where he majored in music. After small roles in several studio feature films, including Starship Troopers (1997), Showerman was cast in the lead in Dumped (2000). His big break came in 2003 when he was cast to replace Brendan Fraser as George in George of the Jungle 2 (2003).

In 2000, Showerman married Kimberly and raised two daughters.

== Career ==
Showerman has appeared in such films as Sea of Fear, Idol, Live Fast, Die Young, Complacent, and Big Game. His film credits include Hole in One, A Night at the Silent Movie Theater, Commander and Chief, and Radio America, which he also wrote, produced and directed. On television, he has appeared on Jack of All Trades, The OC, and CSI Miami.

A year after Brendan Fraser opted not to reprise his role as George in Disney's George of the Jungle 2 sequel, Disney decided to produce the film for the direct-to-video market. Showerman was asked to play the part of George.

=== Producing ===
In 2006, Showerman formed an independent film production company called Shorris Film with Clint Morris, whose first film was the supernatural western Between the Sand and the Sky. The company also produced Radio America, co-starring, directed and written by Showerman. In 2012, Shorris Film co-produced Bristled: The Howl Chronicles.

== Filmography ==
Film roles
Year	Title	Role	Notes
2000	Dumped	Strobe Reilly	Direct-to-video
2001	Frankenbabe	Eddie	Short film
2003	George of the Jungle 2	George	Direct-to-video
2005	The Gentle Barn	Jay	Short film
2006	Sea of Fear	Derek	
2008	Big Game	Luke	
2008	Dead Country	D.J. Seinfeld (voice)	
2008	Live Fast, Die Young	Big Mack	
2009	The Land That Time Forgot	Stack	Direct-to-video
2010	Hole in One	Dr. Hamilton Manning	
2012	The Temple	Derek (voice)	
2012	Commander and Chief		
2012	Complacent	Jason Haney	
2012	A Night at the Silent Movie Theater	Jon the Soundman	
2014	This Ain't a Game	King Slayer	Short film
2014	The Adventures of Captain Fantastic & Mega Mom	Captain Fantastic	Short film
2014	Obsessed	XX	Short film
2014	Between the Sand and the Sky	Lorin Sheffield	Direct-to-video
2014	A Fistful of Feathers	Mark	Short film
2015	Scooby-Doo! and the Beach Beastie	Police Officer (voice)	Direct-to-video
2015	Batman: Personal Issues	Batman	Short film
2015	Radio America	Simon Weinreib	
2015	Cyber Case	Agent Willis	
2015	Of Fortune and Gold	Marco	
2015	EP/Executive Protection	Capt. Simmons	
2016	Smoke Filled Lungs		
2016	Terror Tales	The Driver	Segment: "Wraparound"
2016	Flagged	Landlord	Short film
2017	Lady Bug	Man	
2017	Branded		
2017	The Waiting Room	The Boss / Mr. Brown	Short film
2018	Enter the Fire	Henry	
2018	Astro	Dr. Kevin Green	
2018	Encounter	Johnny Brandt	
2018	Double Blind	John Smith	
2019	Vitals	Richard Carson	
2019	Change of Plans	Jeff	Short film
2021	The Method	Desmond Gage	
2024	Agent Recon	Doctor Penn / Alpha	Post-production
TBA	Black Water		

Television roles
Year	Title	Role	Notes
2000	Jack of All Trades	Extra	Uncredited; Episode: "Return of the Dragoon"
2004	The O.C.	Impossibly Hot Fireman	Episode: "The Strip"
2006	CSI: Miami	Pete Nealy	Episode: "Driven"
2015	Just Plain Dead	Wesley Wolfram	TV Pilot
2016	Supergirl	Tor	3 episodes
2016	Scorpion	Captain	Episode: "It Isn't the Fall That Kills You"
2017	Agents of S.H.I.E.L.D.	Agent Moore	Episode: "No Regrets"
2017	Transplants	Philip	Episode: "Networking"
2017	Tales of Morrissa	Alex	2 episodes
2017	Versus		4 episodes
2018	The Young and the Restless	Officer Michael Hunter	1 episode
2019–2020	Truth Be Told	C.O. Walters	2 episodes
2020	The Dresden Files	John Marcone	Episode: "Peace Talks"

Theatre
Year	Title	Role	Notes
2019	The Little Mermaid	King Triton	
