= Adam Mayfield =

American actor (born 1976)

- Born: August 2, 1976 (age 50); Houston, Texas, U.S.
- Education: DePaul University (BFA)
- Occupation: Actor
- Years active: 1995–present
- Spouse: Virginia Novello (m. 2015)
- Website: https://adammayfield.actor/

Adam Mayfield (born August 2, 1976) is an American actor. He is best known for portraying Scott Chandler on the ABC soap opera All My Children. He has joined the cast of NBC soap opera drama series Days of Our Lives, and debuted in 2015.

== Biography ==
Mayfield was born August 2, 1976, and grew up in Houston. He has one brother, two half-brothers, and two half-sisters. He appeared in various other TV shows and movies guest-starring in minor roles. He attended the High School for the Performing and Visual Arts and earned a BFA in acting from the DePaul Theatre School.

== Filmography ==
=== Film ===
Year	Show	Role	Notes
2001	The Tempest	Key Rioter	
2006	Sea of Fear	Joel	
2007	Lost at War	Pvt. McCune	Direct-to-video
2007	Zombie Wars	David	Direct-to-video
2008	Corpse Run	Kaesler	
2012	Would You Rather	Steward 2	
2018	Christmas Harmony	Luke	
2019	Ford v Ferrari	Lloyd Ruby	
2020	Scorpion Girl: The Awakening	Hans Von Krugger	
2022	Prisoner of Love	Casey White	

=== Television ===
Year	Film	Role	Notes
1995	Walker, Texas Ranger	Cully Lansford	Episode: "Point After"
2000	Boston Public	Bobby Renfroe	Episode: "Chapter Three"
2001	Just Shoot Me!	Steve	Episode: "Mayas and Tigers and Deans, Oh My"
2001	The Hughleys	The FedEx Guy	Episode: "A Cry for Pleh"
2006	Girlfriends	Valet	Episode: "Game Over"
2009	The Storm	Brooks	Episode: "The Storm, Part 2"
2009–2010	All My Children	Scott Chandler / Damon	206 episodes
2011	Friend Zone: The Series	John	Episode: "From High School"
2011	Working Class	Blake	Episode: "Pay Back"
2012	The Preacher's Daughter	Neal Posey	Television film
2012	Matchmaker Santa	Dean Ford	Television film
2013	Status Updates	Jared	6 episodes
2013	The Client List	Ben Miller	Episode: "What Part of No?"
2014	Sweet Surrender	Tom Campbell	Television film
2014	Felix Blithedale	Edward Rockridge	5 episodes
2014	Mystery Girls	Michael	3 episodes
2014	A Christmas Kiss II	Cooper Montgomery	Television film
2015	Days of Our Lives	Ted Carpenter / Ted	5 episodes
2015	Whole Day Down	FBI Agent	Episode: "Pale Ryder"
2016	NCIS	Tall Tony	Episode: "Charade"
2016	Blend In	Dr. Colin	Television film
2017	A Neighbor's Deception	Michael Anderson	Television film
2018	The Curious Creations of Christine McConnell	Norman	4 episodes
