= Sea of Fear =

- DVD cover
- Directed by: Andrew Schuth
- Written by: Andrew Schuth
- Produced by: Andrew Schuth
- Starring: Edward Albert; Katherine Bailess; Kieren Hutchison; Burgess Jenkins; Adam Mayfield; Christopher Showerman; Caroline Walker
- Cinematography: Marco Cappetta
- Edited by: David Rawlins; Clay Rawlins
- Music by: Brandon Roberts
- Production company: Even Keel Productions
- Distributed by: Lionsgate Home Entertainment
- Release date: August 22, 2006
- Running time: 90 minutes
- Country: United States
- Language: English

Sea of Fear is a 2006 American slasher film produced, written and directed by Andrew Schuth, and starring Edward Albert, Katherine Bailess, Kieren Hutchison, Burgess Jenkins, Adam Mayfield, Christopher Showerman and Caroline Walker. The film is about a group of people on a boat who fall victim to a killing spree. It was released direct-to-DVD on August 22, 2006, by Lionsgate.

== Plot ==
Four friends take a vacation on a boat, with its skipper and three crew. By a campfire one night, the seven discuss the kind of death each fears most. One by one, each of the party is killed by the method he fears most.

== Cast ==
- Edward Albert as Captain
- Katherine Bailess as Kate
- Kieren Hutchison as Tom
- Burgess Jenkins as Lance
- Adam Mayfield as Joel
- Christopher Showerman as Derek
- Caroline Walker as Ashley
- Jeri Sprague as Dead Girl on Boat
