= Katherine Bailess =

American actress, singer, and dancer

- Born: Vicksburg, Mississippi, U.S.
- Occupations: Actress; dancer; singer-songwriter
- Years active: 2001–present
- Partner: Michael Flynn (m. 2022)
- Children: 1

Katherine Bailess is an American actress, singer, and dancer best known for playing the role of Erica Marsh on the CW's hit show One Tree Hill, Life and Death Brigade member Stephanie on Gilmore Girls, and Kyle Hart on the VH1 series Hit the Floor.

== Early life and education ==
Bailess was born in Vicksburg, Mississippi, to Natalie and Bobby Bailess. Her father is an attorney and a former linebacker for the Ole Miss Rebels football team at the University of Mississippi. She began training classically in dance at age four. She also participated in competitive gymnastics and cheerleading throughout her childhood. At age 11, Bailess performed on the televised Miss Mississippi Pageant as a dancer, and continued to perform for the pageant for seven years. She won scholarships to study dance at both the Broadway Dance Center in New York City and Ann Reinking's Broadway Theater Project in Florida. She was a debutante. After college, Bailess went on to study at the William Esper Studio's two-year intensive program.

== Career ==
Bailess starred in the 2003 film From Justin to Kelly, playing the role of Alexa, and in Universal's 2004 film Bring It On Again, playing the role of Colleen Lipman. Her TV credits include recurring roles on the popular WB shows Gilmore Girls and One Tree Hill. Kat also recurred on Fox's The Loop, Sordid Lives the Series and guest starred on NCIS. Bailess starred in the YouTube comedic series Shit Southern Women Say written and directed by Julia Fowler.

Bailess played the role of Kyle Hart in the VH1 scripted series Hit the Floor.

== Filmography ==
=== Film ===
Year	Title	Role	Notes
2001	The Bootlegger	Angie	Short
2001	Yoga/Pilates Workout System	Herself	Video
2003	From Justin to Kelly	Alexa	
2004	Bring It On Again	Colleen Lipman	Video
2006	Jackass Number Two	Dancer	Uncredited
2006	Sea of Fear	Kate	
2010	Elle: A Modern Cinderella Tale	Stephanie	Also Producer
2010	Below The Beltway	Hope P.	
2012	Stone Markers	Newscaster	
2012	Macedo: Caught	Dancer	Short
2012	Prick	Hot Blonde	Short
2013	2 Dead 2 Kill	Anna Falactic	
2017	A Very Sordid Wedding	Greta	
2019	The Naughty List	Keegan Collier	completed

=== Television ===
Year	Title	Role	Notes
2004	Gilmore Girls	Girl	1 Episode
2004	Gilmore Girls	Stephanie	1 Episode
2005	One Tree Hill	Erica Marsh	6 Episodes
2006	NCIS	Madison	1 Episode
2007	The Loop	Wende	2 Episodes
2007	The 15th Annual Movieguide Awards	Herself	Television movie
2008	New Now Next Awards	Herself	Television special
2008	Sordid Lives: The Series	Nurse Waring	3 Episodes
2012	Class with Chadwick Chubb	Sexy Female Detective	Television movie
2013–2018	Hit the Floor	Kyle Hart	Main
2013	Do Something Awards	Herself	Television special
2013	AfterBuzz TV	Herself	Panelist
2014	Anger Management	Susie	1 Episode
2015	VH1 Big in 2015 with Entertainment Weekly	Herself	Television special
2016	The Playboy Morning Show	Herself	1 Episode
2016	Noches con Platanito	Herself	1 Episode
2016	TMI Hollywood	Host-Various	1 Episode
2016	Bones	Kelsey Whitney	1 Episode
2016	Home & Family	Herself	2 Episodes
2016–2017	Another Blackout	Marcy	2 Episodes
2018	Deadly Matrimony	Sara Ross	Television movie
2020	Dashing on December	Willa	Television movie
