= Steve Talley =

American actor (born 1981)

- Born: Steven Douglas Talley; August 12, 1981 (age 45); Indianapolis, Indiana, U.S.
- Occupation: Actor
- Years active: 2002–present
- Spouse: Lyndon Smith (m. 2015; div. 2023)
- Children: 1

Steven Douglas Talley (born August 12, 1981) is an American actor who grew up in Avon, Indiana. He is best known for his portrayal of Dwight Stifler in American Pie Presents: The Naked Mile and American Pie Presents: Beta House.

== Career ==
Talley's on-screen career began in 2002, with a minor part in the daytime soap opera As the World Turns. He appeared in three episodes of the drama series Summerland between June and July 2005 as Bryce. The following year, Talley made a guest appearance in the drama film Peaceful Warrior and on the sitcom Twins.

In the same year, Talley portrayed Dwight Stifler in American Pie Presents: The Naked Mile, the fifth installment in the American Pie film series. Released directly to video, the film earned over US$27 million worldwide. Scott Weinberg of DVD Talk wrote that Talley as Stifler "makes for one of the least appealing movie characters I've ever seen." The following year, Talley again starred as Stifler in American Pie Presents: Beta House, the sixth installment in the series. Released directly to video, the film earned over US$18 million worldwide.

Talley was featured in Van Wilder: Freshman Year as the character Dirk Arnold and also starred as Eric P. Keller in the 2010 direct-to-DVD film Hole in One, which had various names prior to release. Recently Talley has moved on to less juvenile movies, landing the lead role of investigative reporter Matt Harper in Deadline, about the racially motivated murder of an African-American youth in the South. As well as film credits, Talley has also featured in a British television commercial for Pepsi Max. During Super Bowl XLIV, he drove a car in a Bridgestone commercial about a crazy bachelor party gone wrong. Talley is also featured in a 2010 Pizza Hut ad campaign. It was announced in late June 2012 that he would play Ella Montgomery's (Holly Marie Combs) love interest on Pretty Little Liars. In 2014 he landed bigger recurring roles on two critically acclaimed TV shows: VH1's 90s nostalgia dramedy Hindsight and The CW's post-apocalyptic drama The 100. Showrunner Jason Rothenberg and writer Kim Shumway liked what Talley did with the character, the engineer Kyle Wick, so much that they developed a bigger story arc for him in season 2.

== Personal life ==
In 2015, Talley married actress Lyndon Smith. They divorced in 2023.

== Filmography ==
=== Film ===
Year	Title	Role	Notes
2006	Peaceful Warrior	Young Garage Man	Feature film debut
2006	American Pie Presents: The Naked Mile	Dwight Stifler	
2007	American Pie Presents: Beta House	Dwight Stifler	
2009	Van Wilder: Freshman Year	Dirk Arnold	
2009	One Way to Valhalla	John	
2009	Canned	Topher	Television film
2010	Hole in One	Eric P. Keller	
2010	Jelly	Cool guy	
2010	First Dates	Dylan	
2010	The Accidental Death of Joey by Sue	Joey	
2010	Southern Discomfort	Ty Dobson	Television film
2011	Beyond the Blackboard	Greg Bess	Television film
2011	The List	Steve	Short film
2012	Deadline	Matt Harper	Also co-producer
2013	Adopted	Jeff	Television film
2014	Death Pact	Ted Dunbar	Television film
2014	Damaged Goods	Jason	Television film
2015	Tales from the Darkside	Ziggy	Television film
2016	Sebastian Says	Trevor	Television film
2017	Love on the Vines	Seth	Television film
2019	How It's Goin'	Steve	Short film

=== Television ===
Year	Title	Role	Notes
2002	As the World Turns	Buzzy Markman	Episode dated October 25, 2002
2005	Summerland	Bryce	3 episodes
2006	Twins	Ice	Episode: "Blonde Ambition"
2009	Castle	Kent Scoville	Episode: "Hedge Fund Homeboys"
2010	NCIS	Bill	Episode: "Moonlighting"
2010	Criminal Minds	Michael Kosina	Episode: "Middle Man"
2011	Love Bites	Dan Sullivan	3 episodes
2012	Last Man Standing	Chad Bickle	Episode: "Moon Over Kenya"
2012	I Just Want My Pants Back	Brett	3 episodes
2012–2013	Stevie TV	Various characters	4 episodes
2012–2014	Pretty Little Liars	Zack	Recurring role; 5 episodes
2012	Franklin & Bash	Brock Daniels	Episode: "650 to SLC"
2012	Friend Me	Chuck	Recurring role; 6 episodes Unaired
2012	Cassandra French's Finishing School for Boys	Owen	Episode: "Pilot"
2014	The Crazy Ones	Owen	2 episodes
2014–2015	The 100	Kyle Wick	Recurring role; 5 episodes
2015	Hindsight	Kevin	Recurring role; 5 episodes
2016	2 Broke Girls	Owen	Episode: "And the Not Regular Down There"
2016–2017	Idiotsitter	Dev	Recurring role; 8 episodes
2016	Fuller House	Darren	Episode: "The Not-So-Great Escape"
2016	The Mindy Project	Jonah	Episode: "The Greatest Date in the World"
2016	Young & Hungry	Kendrick	Episode: "Young & Sofia"
2016	The Great Indoors	Devin	Episode: "Going Deep"
2016	12 Deadly Days	Kris	Episode: "Elves Ascending"
2017	Workaholics	Carson	Episode: "Monstalibooyah"
2017–2018	Girlfriends' Guide to Divorce	Tony	Guest (season 4), recurring (season 5); 7 episodes
2018	The Guest Book	Scott	Episode: "Tonight You Become a Man"
2019–2021	American Dad!	Cowboy / Improv Actor / Francis Mallmann (voice)	4 episodes
2019	Mr. Mom		Episode: "Crickets"
2019–2020	Perfect Harmony	Karl	2 episodes
2020	Outmatched	Doug	Episode: "Dating"
2021	Country Comfort	Jimmy	Episode: "Sign, Sign, Everywhere a Sign"
