= Hole in One (2010 film) =

- Directed by: Drew Ann Rosenberg
- Written by: Mike Terrell; Mark Maine
- Produced by: Mark Maine
- Starring: Steve Talley; David Ellison; K. T. Tatara; Dean Cameron; Christopher Showerman; Dean Cain
- Distributed by: Universal Studios
- Release date: September 12, 2010 (United Kingdom)
- Country: United States
- Language: English
- Box office: £1,600,000 GBP

Hole in One (also known as ParFection: The Golf Movie) is a 2010 American sports sex comedy film starring Steve Talley, David Ellison, K. T. Tatara, Dean Cameron, Christopher Showerman and Dean Cain.

It is about an undergraduate student who gets tricked by some surgeons who operate on him, giving him a set of breasts, forcing him to earn money through golf for the reverse surgery.

The movie was released by Universal Studios via Universal Pictures and launched in the United Kingdom on September 12, 2010, with a wide release in an additional 65 territories and countries. It is awaiting a US Domestic release. While the film's tagline is 'American Pie Plays Golf,' and the film stars Steve Talley, who played Dwight Stifler in American Pie Presents: The Naked Mile and American Pie Presents: Beta House, the film is not part of the American Pie film series.

== Plot ==
Eric Keller (Steve Talley) is a college student who normally skips classes to hustle random people at a nearby golf course; while winning a round of golf against someone, Keller is secretly being spied on by two anonymous men. Later that evening, he attends a party with his friends, including Tyler Hayden (David Ellison) a dropout who is hoping to turn his golf clothing business, PAHR Fairway-Essentials, into a success, as well as Mark Zbeitnefski (K.T. Tatara) and Jason Jones (Jerad Anderson), who both focus more on pursuing college girls. Also at the party is Tyler's sister, Mandy (Sandy Modic) who almost shares an intimate moment with Keller before being chased off by Tyler, who doesn't approve of a relationship between the two because of Keller's lifestyle. After Mandy leaves the party, Keller is talked into having sex with a random student at the party; Keller is caught when Mark secretly records them together and plays the tape at Tyler's PAHR shop the next day, hurting Mandy in the process.

Keller is talked into taking on the same two anonymous men spying on him the previous day, who are revealed to be plastic surgeons Dr. Carlton (Dean Cameron) and Dr. Hamilton (Christopher Showerman) from their own company NuBoobs. Keller signs an agreement that if he wins, he'll get $50,000, but if the surgeons win, Keller becomes a test patient for any projects they have in mind. It's soon discovered that the same guy helping Keller hustle people on the course has now appeared to help these two surgeons hustle Keller instead. After Keller loses, he attempts to bail on the surgeons but gets tased unconscious. Keller wakes up the next morning in his own home only to discover he's been given breast implants overnight by the surgeons.

Along with Tyler, Keller visits the surgeons demanding the operation to be reversed, but they'll only do it for $50,000 and give Keller two weeks to get said money or else they mail his post-surgery pictures out to his family and friends. Tyler attempts to get rapper Darius "Ice Pyk" Vernon to sponsor PAHR, but he brings Mark to the meeting, whose dialogue gets both of them kicked out of Ice Pyk's building. Convinced by Tyler to do so, Keller heads back to the golf course and begins winning rounds of golf for money against various people, eventually becoming comfortable in golfing with implants. During these series of events, Keller is pursued by a repo man (Dean Cain) who is constantly trying to collect Keller's mustang that he's behind with payments on; the repo man eventually succeeds, but immediately wrecks the vehicle after the brakes were cut by Mark, who was only attempting to repair them.

Together, Keller and Tyler earn $42,000 in two weeks, just falling eight grand short of the surgeons' demands. Keller makes one more offer to the surgeons, stating that if he and Tyler can beat them, the surgeons reverse the operation free of charge, but if the surgeons win, Tyler gives up PAHR to them. During the match, Keller struggles until Mandy shows up with Keller's father. It was revealed that the surgeons went back on their word and mailed Keller's post-surgery pics to his father. Mandy forgives Keller for his actions, and his father convinces Keller to pursue a career in golf after seeing how much money he had won in two weeks. This is enough for Keller to get his groove back and win the match by one stroke over the surgeons.

The surgeons declare that they won't reverse the surgery despite losing, but are soon chased down by Ice Pyk's bodyguards, while Ice Pyk himself agrees to work with PAHR, much to Tyler's delight. The movie ends with commercials for PAHR Golf and NuBoobs.

== Cast ==
- Steve Talley as Eric Keller
- David Ellison as Tyler Hayden
- Dean Cameron as Dr. Carlton
- Christopher Showerman as Dr. Hamilton
- Sandy Modic as Mandy Hayden
- K.T. Tatara as Mark Zbeitnefski
- Jerad Anderson as Jason Jones
- Jossara Jinaro as Joslyn Whitmore
- Dean Cain as Repo Man
- Patrick Hubbard as Roman Helbron
- Thomas Aske Berg as Fergus MacGuinness
- Rico E. Anderson as Darius 'Ice Pyk' Vernon
- Jordan Engle as JoJo the Photographer
- Jillie Reil as Cheryl - Doctor's Assistant
- Steve Giannelli as Dan Daniels
- Herme Chua as Tiger Woods
- Stephanie June as News Reporter

== Reception ==
No reviews listed at Rotten Tomatoes https://www.rottentomatoes.com/m/hole_in_one/
