= Nashville Area Hispanic Chamber of Commerce =

Coordinates: 36.15611°N 86.772413°W

The Nashville Area Hispanic Chamber of Commerce is a chamber of commerce in Nashville, Tennessee, United States.

In 2008, it opposed a local English-only measure.

Established in January 2000 as a 501 (c)6 non-profit corporation in Tennessee, the Nashville Area Hispanic Chamber of Commerce, is the oldest, longest running Hispanic business membership organization, actively promoting the economic growth and development of Hispanic entrepreneurs representing the interests of small business members in the Nashville and surrounding areas. The NAHCC connects, entrepreneurs and micro-enterprises, facilitating strategic alliances, networking and sharing of business and financial best practices.

On March 29, 2016, led by its President & CEO, Yuri Cunza, the NAHCC signed and inter-chamber cooperative agreement with the Nashville Black Chamber of Commerce. A similar agreement was signed by the NAHCC in October with the Nashville LGBT Chamber of Commerce, and on March 22, 2017, with Williamson Inc chamber of commerce.

In February 2017, the Nashville Area Hispanic Chamber of Commerce was one of two Hispanic chambers from around the country to obtain the prestigious Chamber Training Institute (CTI) NAtional Certification designation presented by the University of Notre Dame through the United States Hispanic Chamber of Commerce Foundation, in collaboration with the US Black Chambers, Inc., the US Pan Asian American Chamber of Commerce, and the National Gay & Lesbian Chamber of Commerce.

On October 2, 2017, NAHCC President & CEO Yuri Cunza received on behalf of the Nashville Area Hispanic Chamber of Commerce the prestigious Chamber of The Year Award by the United States Hispanic Chamber of Commerce (USHCC) at their National Convention in Dallas, Texas. The USHCC recognizes the Chamber of the Year from among more than 200 Hispanic Chambers of Commerce throughout the nation. Award recipients are selected by an independent panel of judges and are chosen based on their contributions to their commercial ecosystems, outstanding accomplishments, quality of service, innovation of programs, leadership and commitment to the Hispanic business community.

On March 1, 2018, the NAHCC joined the United States Hispanic Chamber of Commerce in urging Congress to take immediate action to protect the DACA program. "On behalf of approximately 2,000 Hispanic-owned business in Tennessee, we strongly urge Congress to take immediate action to provide a permanent resolution for DACA recipients," said Yuri Cunza, President & CEO of the Nashville Area Hispanic Chamber of Commerce. "The lack of certainty has caused confusion and fear among DACA-eligible young adults. Congressional inaction will result in the loss of a highly educated and skilled workforce in our community."
