= Yuri Cunza =

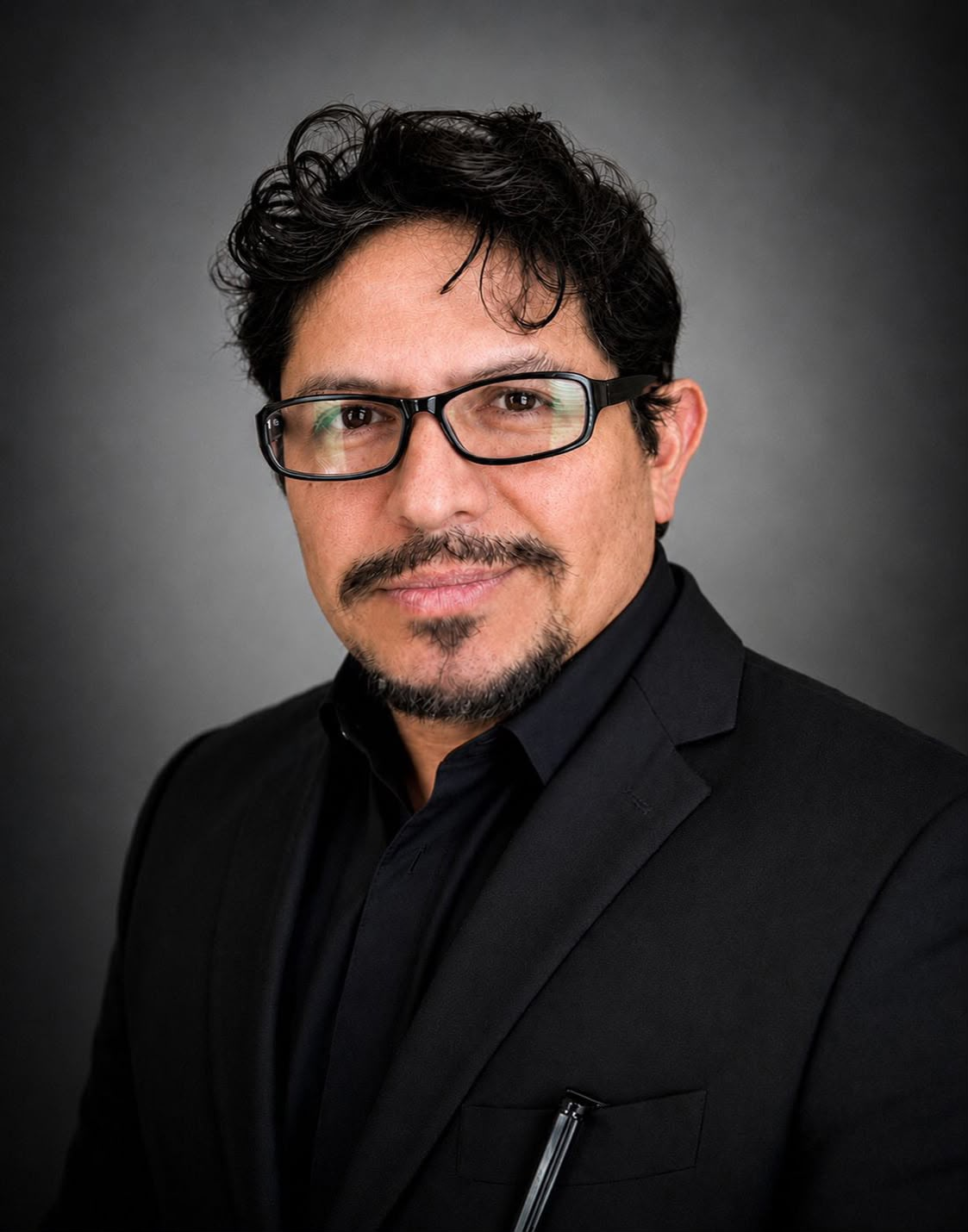
Yuri Cunza

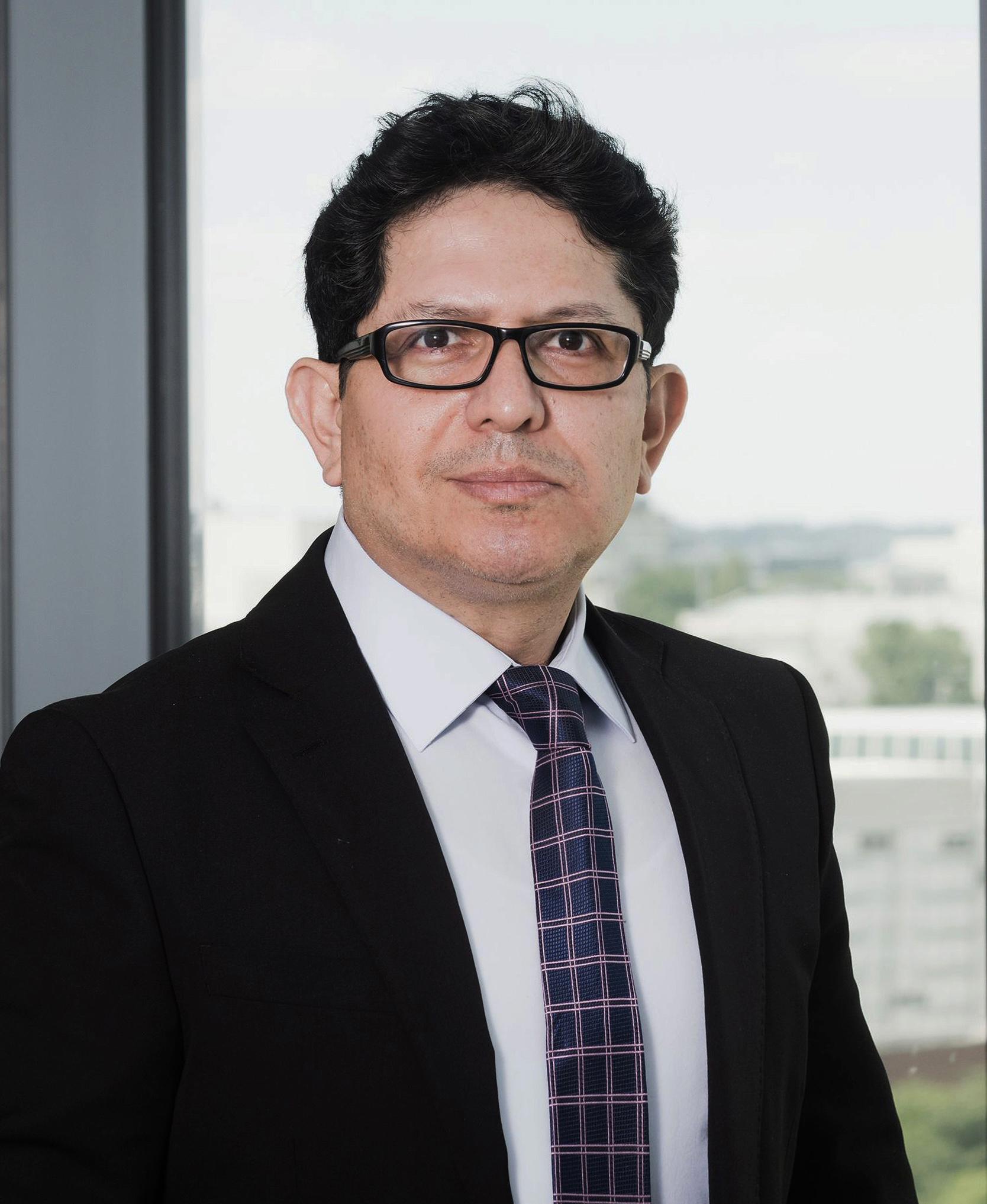
Yuri Cunza 2022

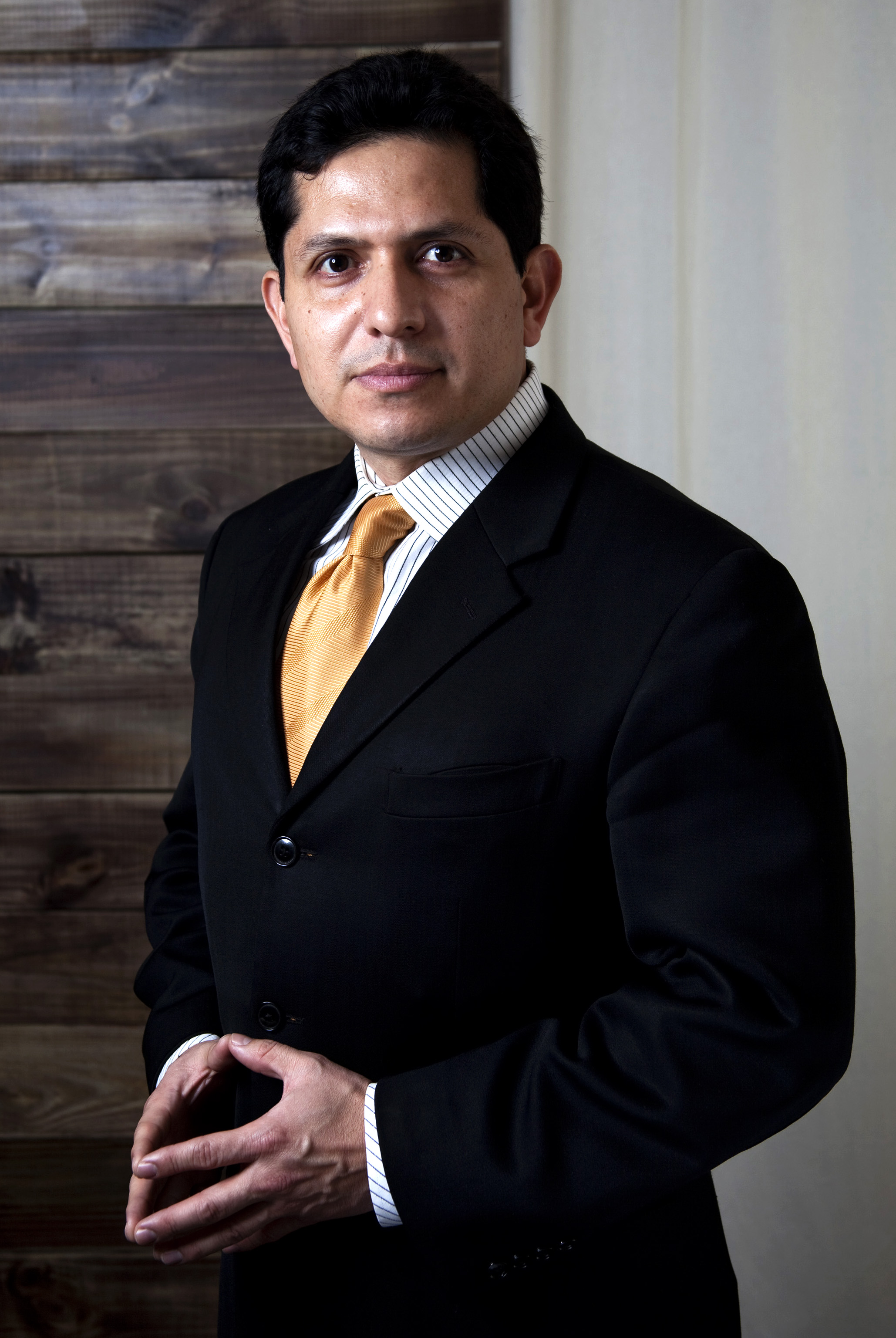
Yuri Cunza, Nashville, Tennessee

Yuri Cunza is an American social entrepreneur, media professional, journalist, visual artist, business leader, and community advocate. Cunza currently serves as President and CEO of the Nashville Area Hispanic Chamber of Commerce, and is founder and editor in chief of the Spanish language newspaper La Noticia and owner of Y&K a media support and consulting services company based in Nashville. In September 2018, Yuri Cunza was selected to serve on the United States Hispanic Chamber of Commerce Board of Directors. The USHCC is the largest Hispanic business organization in the United States. It was founded in 1979 and is headquartered in Washington, DC. The chamber promotes the economic growth and development of entrepreneurs and represents the interests of nearly 4.37 million Hispanic owned businesses in the US that contribute in excess of $700 billion to the American economy.

Yuri Cunza is co-founder of the NAHCC Foundation which was constituted in 2008 and exists to advance educational opportunities for Hispanic youth and to inspire children interest in future discoveries and technologies to combat issues that force families and individuals into economic despair. Cunza's humanitarian work includes his advocacy of finding a resolution for the socio-economic disparities of Hispanics in the U.S. He is also a member of the Tennessee Advisory Committee for the U.S. Global Leadership Coalition, The Partnership For A New American Economy, and in the Steering Committee of Main Street -TN Growth & Opportunity Coalition.

== Biography ==
Cunza trained in acting at the International Theater Institute (ITI-UNESCO) and Peruvian Theater Center (CPT) in Lima, Peru. He later earned a scholarship to continue his studies under the guidance of veteran director and educator Eduardo Navarro. He continued his involvement in theater, film and television in his native Peru and later as a Producer/Director in Argentina while attending medical school at the Universidad del Nordeste in Corrientes, Argentina. He later continued his studies in the U.S. earning a B.F.A in Film Directing from Watkins College of Art & Design in 2003.

After he graduated from Saint Norbert high-school a private Catholic school in Lima, Peru, he spent almost a year in Paraguay while awaiting a student exchange program visa to attend medical school at Universidad Nacional del Nordeste (UNNE) in the city of Corrientes, Argentina from 1989 to 1992.

Cunza moved to Nashville to reside permanently in 1996. He continued his education at Watkins College of Art & Design earning a Bachelor of Fine Arts Degree and Film Directing. His professional experience includes the series Mujeres Sin Fronteras (Women without Frontiers) for CVC- Argentina. In 2000 Cunza produced Hispanos de Hoy, a weekly bilingual television segment with him as primary host thanks to veteran television personality Teresa Hannah for the local NBC affiliate WSMV-Channel 4 Nashville.

Cunza's perspective on diversity issues has been influenced by living in different Latin-American countries appearing reflected in his work: 'rich in powerful messages of strong social content'. Under the Skin a documentary he wrote, directed and produced in 2001 takes a profound look into the dynamics of racial diversity in human relations -representing accurately America's multicultural dimension. The official selection of the Nashville Independent Film Festival in 2002 and the 2003 International Film Forum, Under the Skin was premiered on WSMV Ch-4 Nashville on July 8, 2001.

Cunza] is an active advocate of Hispanic business development and growth as well as of immigrant and civil rights causes in Middle Tennessee. His comments have been featured in several English language publications and media outlets including TN Business, The Tennessean, The City Paper, The Nashville Business Journal, American Renaissance, the SCENE, The Associated Press, Reuters, Channels, 2, 4, 5 and 17, National Public Radio (NPR), WPLN and Radio Free Nashville. In 2006-07 Cunza began production of "Pulso Mundial" (Worlds' Pulse) Nashville's first bilingual hour long radio program which aired Friday morning on 98.9 FM.

Cunza has served on the advisory board for Scarritt-Bennett Center's "Celebration of Cultures", the National Academy of Television Arts & Science's board of Governors and the board of directors for the Belcourt Theatre, The Nashville Film Festival, and the American Red Cross and more than a dozen more other organizations; ranging from business, health, non-profit, arts and culture. Cunza is a member of many national organization including the National Association of Latino Independent Producers (NALIP), the Screen Actors Guild- American Federation of Television and Radio Artists (SAG-AFTRA), the National Association of Hispanic Journalists, NAACP, National Association of Hispanic Publications. Locally he is a new member of the Downtown Nashville Rotary Club among civic groups, serves on the board of Project C.U.R.E., Tennessee World Affairs Council TNWAC, Watkins College of Art at Belmont University, and served on the boards of the HIV/AIDS research based Comprehensive Care Center and Street Works, the Metro General Hospital's "Friends in General Board". Yuri served one term as Chairman of the Board of Directors of the Nashville Area Hispanic Chamber of Commerce from 2004 to 2006.

Cunza was elected last July 2010 Council Member at Large to the Nashville branch of the Screen Actors Guild. He is returning to serve on the Board of Directors of SAG-AFTRA Nashville in September of 2025. Yuri served on the board of Historic Nashville Inc, Sister Cities of Nashville, the Community-based AIDS service organization Nashville Cares and the American Red Cross.

As a visual artist, Cunza's credits include exhibits at the Metropolitan Nashville Airport, Metropolitan Nashville Public Library, The Brownlee O. Currey, JR. Gallery at Watkins College of Art, the Madison Arts Center and most recently from August 19 to October 8 of 2011 at the Metro Arts Commission Gallery as part of a collective exhibit of Hispanic artist titled "New Life, New Work" / Nueva Vida, Nuevo Trabajo.

In 2007 Yuri Cunza served as a guest curator for Cheekwood's Music City Picks. Later in 2007 Cunza was invited to serve on the board of the prestigious Tennessee Art League (TAL).

An accomplished writer and public speaker, Cunza has appeared before thousands of corporate, institutional, educational and government audiences including the U.S Attorney's Office, U.S Hispanic Chamber of Commerce, Metro Police Academy, FBI, Nashville Fire Department, Nashville Mayor's office, Nashville Metro Public Schools (NMPS), Meeting Planners International, Walmart/SAM's Club, McNeelly Piggot and Fox, Association of Public Accountants, Jefferson Street Missionary Baptist Church, The Urban League, IMF's MLK Annual Celebration, NAACP, University of Memphis, Boy Scouts Club, Tennessee State University (TSU), Middle Tennessee State University (MTSU), Vanderbilt University, Institute for Supply Management, and more.

A Nashville resident since 1996, Cunza became a U.S citizen on September 22, 2006 at a citizenship ceremony presided by United States federal judge Robert Echols at The Hermitage, home of U.S President Andrew Jackson. In March 2010, 2011, 2012, 2013, 2014, 2015, 2016, 2017 and 2018 Cunza was named in Nashville Post's "In Charge" list of business and community leaders. Cunza holds a B.F.A in Film Directing from Watkins College of Art at Belmont University, and has attended Executive Education programs at Mendoza School of Business at University of Notre Dame through the Non Profit Executive Programs offered by the University of Notre Dame in partnership with the USHCC Foundation.

Since 2009, Cunza serves as President & CEO of the Nashville Area Hispanic Chamber of Commerce (NAHCC), Middle Tennessee's, most recognized Hispanic business association. Founded on January 27, 2000, the NAHCC represents businesses, entrepreneurs, professionals and organizations with interest in Nashville's booming Hispanic market. Under Cunza's leadership the organization signed a Growth and Unity Inter-Chamber Agreement with the East Tennessee Hispanic Chamber of Commerce, and started exploring forming chapters in Murfreesboro, Franklin and Clarksville.

In 2012, Yuri Cunza completed Harvard Kennedy School Executive Education Program on Creating Collaborative Solutions, focusing on Innovations in Governance, Principled Negotiation, Adaptive Leadership, Executive Core Qualification, and Public Sector Innovation.

In September 2013, The Tennessee Titans selected Cunza as the recipient of the annual Titans Hispanic Heritage Leadership Award. In September 15 of 2013, Yuri Cunza was presented with the SBA (U.S Small Business Administration)'Community Leadership Award' by SBA-Tennessee District Director Walter Perry during a ceremony at Belmont University to mark the beginning of Hispanic Heritage Month.

On October 15, 2014, Cunza successfully marked its 10th year producing the Hispanic Heritage Month Business & Community Awards in Nashville, now under the NAHCC Foundation which he co-founded with 2014 NFL Hispanic Heritage Leadership award recipient Loraine Segovia-Paz.

On December 10, 2014, Yuri Cunza received the Outstanding Service to Forward Human Rights Award at Tennessee's Human Rights Day ceremony held at the First Amendment Center in Nashville.

In May 2015, Cunza received the 2015 Avant-Garde MOSAIC Award for the 'Advancement of Diversity' from the American Advertising Federation - Nashville.

The article "Global food security makes Tennessee, U.S. safer", written by Cunza and Lt. Cdr. Patrick Ryan USN, Ret., founder and president of the Tennessee World Affairs Council, was published on August 2, 2016 in The Tennessean newspaper.

On March 29, 2016 Cunza signed on behalf of the Nashville Area Hispanic Chamber of Commerce he leads as President & CEO, a Strategic Inter-Chamber Partnership Agreement with the Greater Nashville Black Chamber of Commerce. Cunza signed similar agreements to establish a working relationship between organizations that will enhance the availability and delivery of business support services and simultaneously promote economic development and excellence in the greater Nashville area and Middle Tennessee, with the Nashville LGBT Chamber of Commerce on October 10, 2016 and with Williamson Inc on March 22 of 2017. Since 2017 Cunza serves in the Business Advisory Board for Fisk University, a private historically black university founded in 1866 in Nashville, Tennessee, and the first African-American institution to gain accreditation by the Southern Association of Colleges and Schools.

On October 2, 2017 Yuri Cunza received on behalf of the Nashville Area Hispanic Chamber of Commerce the Chamber of The Year Award] by the United States Hispanic Chamber of Commerce (USHCC). The USHCC recognizes the Chamber of the Year from among more than 260 Hispanic Chambers of Commerce throughout the nation. Award recipients are selected by an independent panel of judges and are chosen based on their contributions to their commercial ecosystems, outstanding accomplishments, quality of service, innovation of programs, leadership and commitment to the Hispanic business community.

On March 1 of 2018, Yuri Cunza and the NAHCC joined the United States Hispanic Chamber of Commerce in urging Congress to take immediate action to protect the DACA program. "On behalf of approximately 2,000 Hispanic-owned business in Tennessee, we strongly urge Congress to take immediate action to provide a permanent resolution for DACA recipients," said Yuri Cunza, President & CEO of the Nashville Area Hispanic Chamber of Commerce. "The lack of certainty has caused confusion and fear among DACA-eligible young adults. Congressional inaction will result in the loss of a highly educated and skilled workforce in our community."

In 2021 Cunza was selected as one of 44 participants for the upcoming Leadership Nashville class of 2021-2022.
