= Playwrights Theatre Club =

Influential 1950s Chicago theater

- Genre: Sketch comedy Improvisation
- Date of premiere: 1953
- Location: Chicago, Illinois, United States

Creative team
- Co-founder: Paul Sills
- Co-founder: David Shepherd
- Co-founder: Eugene Troobnick

The Playwright's Theatre Club was founded in Chicago, Illinois in 1953 by Paul Sills, David Shepherd and Eugene Troobnick. The theatre was noted for its original treatment and productions of classic plays as well as premiering original works, and was credited for the creation of The Compass Players and The Second City.

== History ==
=== Sills, Shepherd, and Troobnick ===
In 1953 Paul Sills, David Shepherd, and Eugene Troobnick founded the Playwrights Theatre Club in Chicago. The theatre was noted for its bohemian treatment of classic plays as well as presenting and premiering original works.

The theatre's first known production was Bertolt Brecht's "The Caucasian Chalk Circle." In only two years, the company presented close to 30 full productions. During the rehearsal period, the company members engaged in numerous improvisational theater games that were originally created by Sills' mother, Viola Spolin.

The Playwright's Theatre Club led to the creation of the Compass Players and later The Second City.

=== Compass Players ===
In 1955, the Playwrights Theatre Club was later renamed the Compass Players, concentrating on improvisational theater. Also founded by Shepherd and Sills, the Compass Players was the forerunner of The Second City. Compass launched the careers of Mike Nichols, Elaine May, Jerry Stiller, Alan Alda, Alan Arkin, Barbara Harris, and Shelley Berman (to name a few) and started a revolution in the entertainment industry.

== Famous alum ==
Other members and participants of the Playwrights Theatre Club included Elaine May, Sheldon Patinkin, Rolf Forsberg, Mike Nichols, Joyce Piven, Josephine Forsberg, Ed Asner, Barbara Harris, among others.
