= Role-playing =

Changing of one's behaviour to assume a role

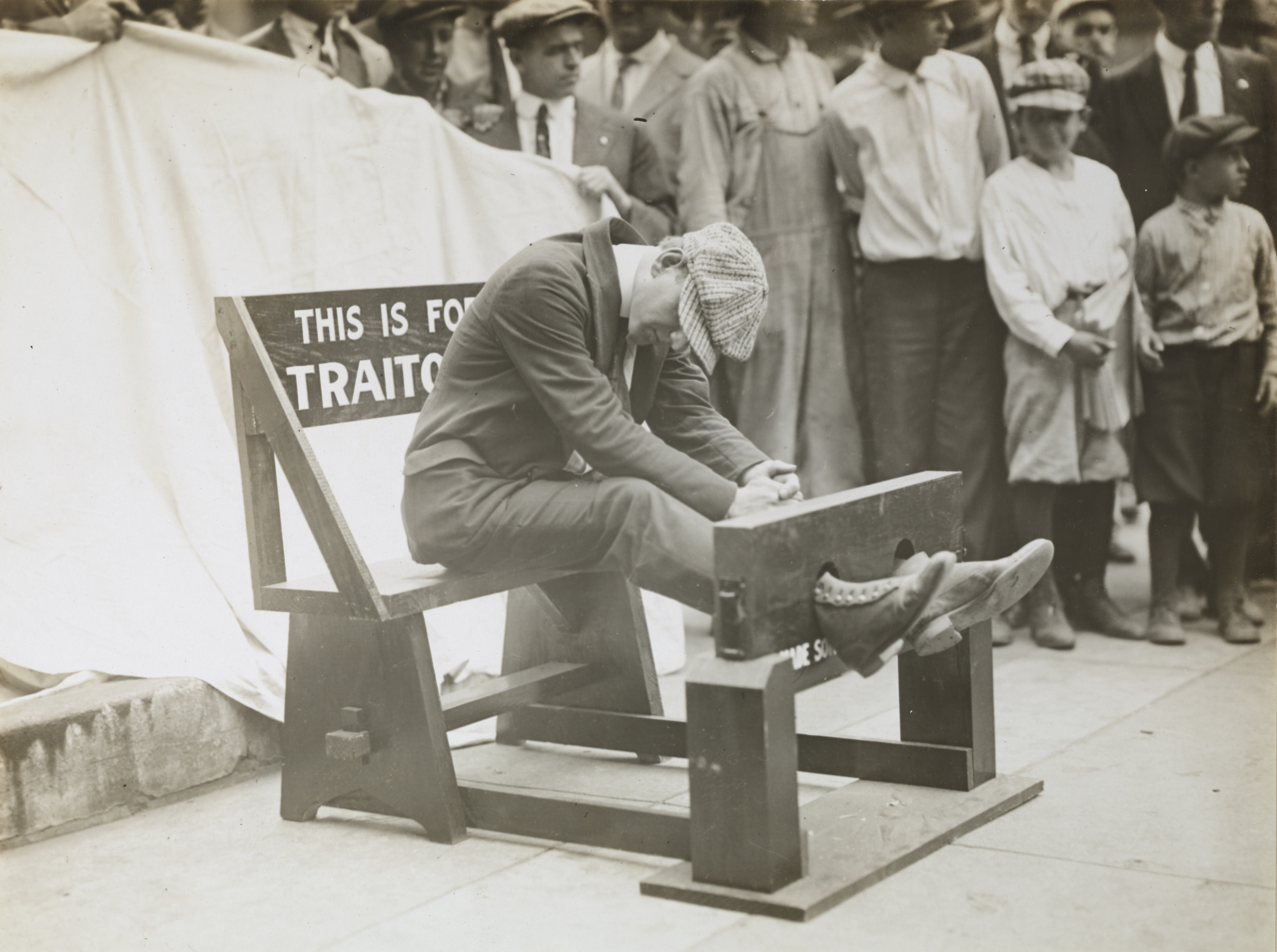
A warning to citizens of Cincinnati, Ohio as to what they may expect in case of disloyalty. The stock is on the public square and this young man merely consented to pose

Role-playing, or roleplaying, is the changing of one's behaviour to assume a different role, either unconsciously to fill a social role, or consciously to act out an adopted role. While the Oxford English Dictionary offers a definition of role-playing as "the changing of one's behaviour to fulfill a social role", in the field of psychology, the term is used more loosely in four senses:

- To refer to the playing of roles generally such as in a theatre, or educational setting;
- To refer to taking a role of a character or person and acting it out with a partner taking someone else's role, often involving different genres of practice;
- To refer to a wide range of games including role-playing video game (RPG), play-by-mail games and more;
- To refer specifically to role-playing games.

== Amusement ==
Many children participate in a form of role-playing known as make believe, wherein they adopt certain roles such as doctor and act out those roles in character. Sometimes make believe adopts an oppositional nature, resulting in games such as cops and robbers.

== Entertainment ==
Historical re-enactment has been practiced by adults for millennia. The ancient Romans, Han Chinese, and medieval Europeans all enjoyed occasionally organizing events in which everyone pretended to be from an earlier age, and entertainment appears to have been the primary purpose of these activities. Within the 20th century, historical re-enactment has often been pursued as a hobby.

Improvisational theatre dates back to the Commedia dell'Arte tradition of the 16th century. Modern improvisational theatre began in the classroom with the "theatre games" of Viola Spolin and Keith Johnstone in the 1950s. Viola Spolin, who was one of the founders the famous comedy troupe Second City, insisted that her exercises were games, and that they involved role-playing as early as 1946. She accurately judged role-playing in the theatre as rehearsal and actor training, or the playing of the role of actor versus theatre roles, but many now use her games for fun in their own right.

=== Role-playing games ===
A role-playing game is a game in which the participants assume the roles of characters and collaboratively create stories. Participants determine the actions of their characters based on their characterisation, and the actions succeed or fail according to a formal system of rules and guidelines. Within the rules, they may improvise freely; their choices shape the direction and outcome of the games.

Role-playing can also be done online in the form of group story creation, involving anywhere from two to several hundred people, utilizing public forums, private message boards, mailing lists, chatrooms, and instant-messaging chat services to build worlds and characters that may last a few hours, or several years. Often on forum-based roleplays, rules, and standards are set up, such as a minimum word count, character applications, and "plotting" boards to increase complexity and depth of story.

There are different genres of which one can choose while role-playing, including, but not limited to, fantasy, modern, medieval, steam punk, and historical. Books, movies, or games can be, and often are, used as a basis for role-plays (which in such cases may be deemed "collaborative fan-fiction"), with players either assuming the roles of established canon characters or using those the players themselves create ("Original Characters") to replace—or exist alongside—characters from the book, movie, or game, playing through well-trodden plots as alternative characters, or expanding upon the setting and story outside of its established canon.

== Psychology ==
In psychology, an individual's personality can be conceptualized as a set of expectations about oneself and others and that these add up to role-playing or role-taking. Here, the role is fiction because it is not real but it has a degree of consistency. Role-playing is also an important part of a child's psychological development. For example, the instance when a child starts to define "I" and separate him or herself from an adult is the initial condition for and the result of role play. There are also experiments that found role-playing resulted in behavioral change such as the case of smokers who reported negative attitude towards smoking after being asked to pretend to be a person diagnosed with lung cancer.

== Training ==
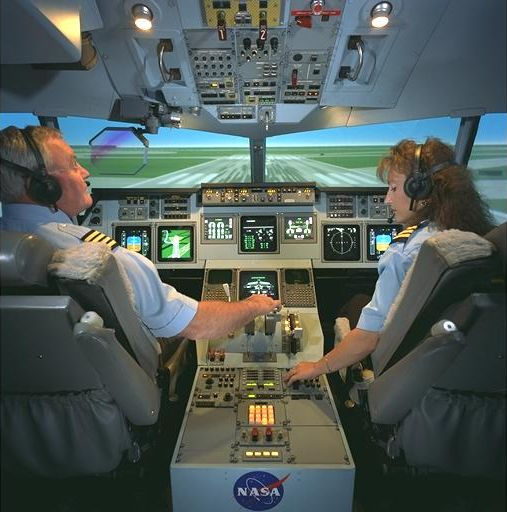
Interior cockpit of a twinjet flight simulator

Role-playing may also refer to role training where people rehearse situations, alone or with others, in preparation for a future performance and to improve their abilities within a role. Some examples are occupational training role-plays, educational role-play exercises, medical role-play, and certain military wargames.

=== Simulation ===
One of the first uses of computers was to simulate real-world conditions for participants role-playing the flying of aircraft. Flight simulators used computers to solve the equations of flight and train future pilots. The army began full-time role-playing simulations with soldiers using computers both within full scale training exercises and for training in numerous specific tasks under wartime conditions. Examples include weapon firing, vehicle simulators, and control station mock-ups.

=== Teddy bear hospital ===
The teddy bear hospital is a roleplay strategy where pediatric and nursing medical students act as a "teddy doctor" to children who act as the carer of a teddy, or another soft toy, requiring consultation. It is used both to reduce anxiety and improve patient outcomes of children, and pedagogically for medical students to better understand children. There are programs for teddy bear hospitals in dozens of universities and medical facilities worldwide.

== Research method ==
Role-playing may also refer to the technique commonly used by researchers studying interpersonal behavior by assigning research participants to particular roles and instructing the participants to act as if a specific set of conditions were true. This technique of assigning and taking roles in psychological research has a long history. It has been used in the early classic social psychological experiments by Kurt Lewin (1939/1997), Stanley Milgram (1963), and Phillip Zimbardo (1971). Herbert Kelman suggested that role-playing might be "the most promising source" of research methods alternative to methods using deception (Kelman 1965).

== See also ==
- Acting
- Costume
- Role reversal
- Sexual roleplay
