= Off-Off Campus =

Improvisational and sketch comedy group

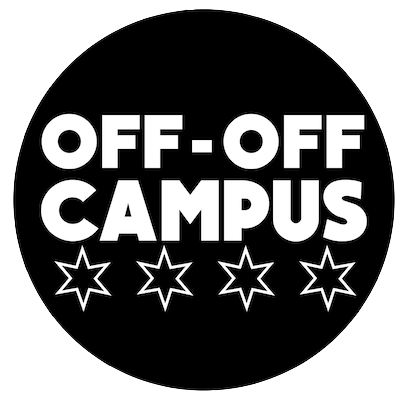
- Genre: Improvisation; Sketch Comedy
- Date of premiere: 1986
- Location: Chicago, Illinois, United States

Creative team
- Founder: Bernie Sahlins
- Artistic Director: Kelli Lynch
- Production Manager: Madison Esrey
- Official website

Off-Off Campus is the oldest improvisational and sketch comedy group at the University of Chicago. It was founded in 1986 by The Second City co-founder Bernie Sahlins, who is also an alumnus of the University of Chicago.

Off-Off Campus stems from a tradition of improv comedy at the University of Chicago. In the early 1950s, improv as it is known today was invented on the University of Chicago campus at the Woodlawn Tap. In 1959, the group, called the Compass Players, went on to form The Second City.

In 1986, Bernie Sahlins returned to the U of C in order to re-establish improv and sketch comedy on the south side of Chicago. The first generation of Off-Off Campus was trained by Sahlins, and the group continues to build on the foundation he created.

Pulitzer Prize winner David Auburn was a member of Off-Off's second generation. Sarah Koenig, host and executive producer of the acclaimed podcast Serial, was a member of the same generation as Auburn. In addition, Tony Award-winner Greg Kotis was one of Off-Off's original members.

Off-Off Campus operates in accordance with the University of Chicago's quarter system. Auditions are held during the first week of each fall quarter. New members train significantly (roughly 20 hours a week) during fall and winter quarters before becoming responsible for mainstage revues in the spring and the following fall.

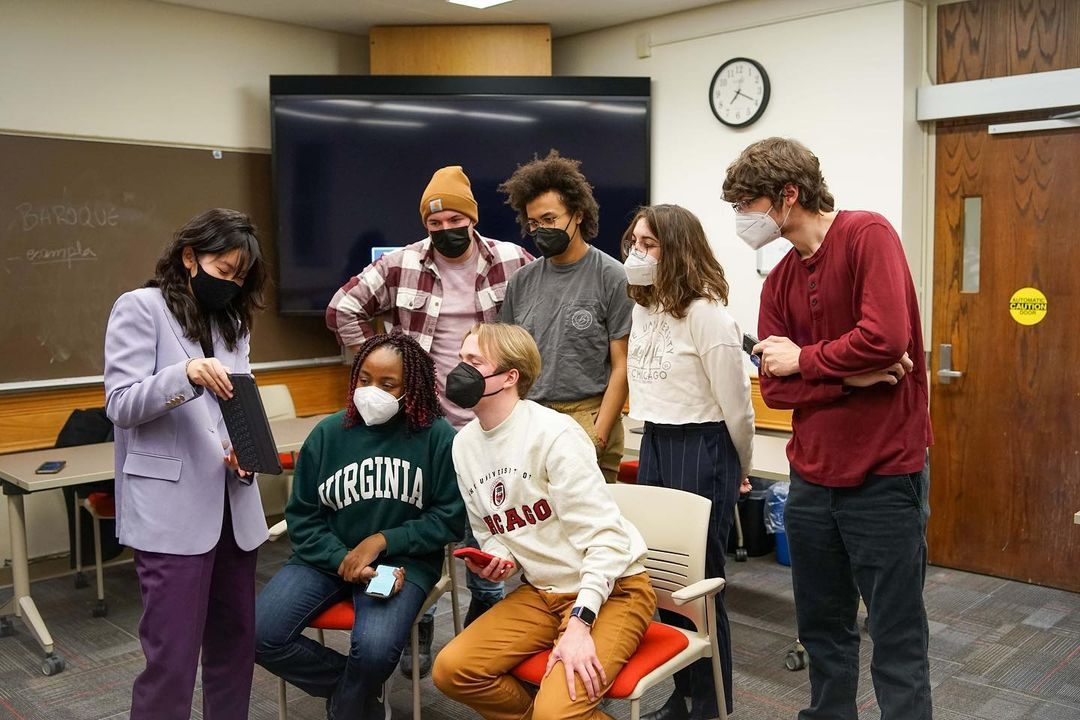
Generation Thirty-Six rehearsing for a sketch show during the Winter 2022 revue
