= Knat Scatt Private Eye =

1986 musical by Eric Forsberg and Charlie Silliman

Knat Scatt Private Eye is a two-act, 1930s-style film noir musical, which played for an extended run at The Theater Building in Chicago in 1986, featuring a young Steve Carell. It was based on a one-act musical with the same title which was originally produced earlier that year by Players Workshop for The Children's Theater of The Second City, and performed on The Second City stage in Chicago. Both versions of Knat Scatt Private Eye were written and directed by Eric Forsberg with music and lyrics by Charlie Silliman.

== Background ==
The 1930s-style musical comedy thriller, Knat Scatt Private Eye, was first produced as a musical for young audiences at The Children's Theater Of The Second City in Chicago in 1986. The original production was produced by Players Workshop, the improv school and production company that trained young performers in sketch comedy for The Second City stage. After attending a performance of Knat Scatt Private Eye at the Second City, independent producers, Robert and Marion Mortimer commissioned the writers to rework the one-act musical into a two-act Broadway-style production for adults. Composer and lyricist, Charlie Silliman, and script writer, Eric Forsberg rewrote the original children's show to be more appealing to a general audience. The new version of Knat Scatt Private Eye was remounted in its new form at The Theater Building in Chicago later that year.

The second production of Knat Scatt Private Eye starred Walter Lewis, Mary Weiss, Lori Hammel, Tim Scott Ferguson, Steve Carell, John Richmond Kenney, Collette Hawley, Marla Cahan, Carla Kendal, Don Neason, Brian-Mark Conover, Travis Lawhon, Phil Martini, and Marilyn Rudnick. Sets were designed by Martin de Maat. The cast of 14 performers play over 40 characters in 2 1/2 hours. Carell played the numb-skull henchman of Ben Behemoth, where one of his bits was burping the alphabet (a gag later used in one of his films), Tony the tough, opera-singing Mafioso and Ching, the singing and dancing Chinese tough who shakes down a neighborhood restaurant owner before Knat Scatt beats him up and saves the day. The second production opened to good reviews from the Chicago Sun-Times and the Chicago Tribune. The play ran for six months on The Theater Building's main stage.

== Members of the Knat Scatt Private Eye cast move on ==
A number of members of the production went on to much bigger things. Mary Weiss was one of the creators of The Real Live Brady Bunch at The Annoyance Theater, which led to a series of feature film remakes. Marla Cahan went on to become a big casting director in New York City and Los Angeles. Martin de Maat went on to become the head of The Second City Training Center. Eric Forsberg went on to make feature films. Steve Carell went on to become a member of The Second City comedy troupe, and later the star of blockbuster movies like 40 Year Old Virgin, Anchorman, and Little Miss Sunshine.
