= The Players Workshop =

School of improvisation in Chicago

Created in 1971 by Josephine Forsberg, The Players Workshop was Chicago's only official school of improvisation for over a decade. Although it was never officially a part of The Second City cabaret theater, The Players Workshop was often referred to as Players Workshop Of The Second City, due to the school's close affiliation with the famous sketch comedy stage. From 1971 through the mid-1990s, performers flocked to The Players Workshop to study improv with Josephine Forsberg, Linnea Forsberg, Martin de Maat, or one of the school's many other instructors, in the hopes of eventually getting onto The Second City mainstage.

Players Workshop was also one of Chicago's largest family entertainment production companies, producing original plays and musicals for The Children's Theater of The Second City for over 30 years. Its production of the one-act musical Knat Scatt Private Eye later went on to be expanded into a full Broadway-style two-act musical which was mounted at The Theater Building and featured an up-and-coming actor named Steve Carell. The production arm of Players Workshop also produced shows for The Body Politic, Candlelight Dinner Theater, Six Flags, Bristol Renaissance Faire and Taste of Chicago. In 1981 Josephine Forsberg hired David Shepherd to teach select students at The Players Workshop his new method of improv competition games. He called his new format "The Improvisational Olympiad"". This was later to grow into the Improv Olympic, better known as the I.O. The Improvisational Olympiad continued to be performed at The Players Workshop for over a year before PW alum, Charna Halpern moved it to its own space in 1983.

The Players Workshop closed its doors in the early 2000s, as Josephine Forsberg retired, and the improv classes at The Second City Training Center and the Improv Olympic grew too large to compete with.

== Notable people ==
=== Directors and instructors ===
- Martin de Maat
- Eric Forsberg
- Josephine Forsberg

=== Alumni ===
- Doug Dale
- Joe Flaherty
- Greg Glienna
- Neil Giuntoli
- Charna Halpern
- Greg Hollimon
- Tim Kazurinsky
- David Koechner
- Shelley Long
- Bill Murray
- Brian Doyle-Murray
- Bob Odenkirk
- Danny Pudi
- Harold Ramis
- Amy Sedaris
- Robert Smigel
- Betty Thomas
- Robert Townsend
- George Wendt
