= Josephine Forsberg =

American comedian, teacher and author

- Born: January 28, 1921; United States
- Died: October 3, 2011 (aged 90); Chicago, IL
- Occupation: Educator

Josephine Forsberg (January 28, 1921 – October 3, 2011) was an American comedian, teacher and author.

== Biography ==
Josephine Forsberg, ex-wife of film director Rolf Forsberg, was hired by Paul Sills and Viola Spolin to join the original Second City in 1959 as the female understudy and Spolin's teaching assistant. She became an expert in improvisational techniques for the theater, and by the mid-1960s she had taken over most of Spolin's and Sills's classes, as well as Spolin's children's theater company. From that point on most of the young performers who wanted to go onto the Second City stage studied with Forsberg for at least a year. These included Bill Murray, Harold Ramis, Betty Thomas, Shelley Long, George Wendt, David Mamet, and Robert Townsend.

In 1971, Forsberg opened up an official school of improvisation called Players Workshop, hiring her nephew Martin de Maat and her daughter Linnea Forsberg to teach alongside her. In terms of accepting students who were not necessarily Second City actors learning the art of improvisation, but also including students from all walks of life and professional disciplines Players Workshop can arguably be called the first real school of Improvisation, with a class structure, syllabus, and graduation requirement, pre-dating loosely organized workshops created in the mid-1970s by Dudley Riggs (Minneapolis, MN USA) and Keith Johnstone (Calgary, AB, Canada). It soon grew to the largest school of improv in the country, training people for the Second City stage through a six term (12 month) course. In 1980, her son Eric Forsberg joined Players Workshop as a director, where he worked with David Shepard to develop a competitive improv game which was later called The Improv Olympiad. One of Forsberg's students, Charna Halpern, joined forces with David Shepard and helped to bring the Improv Olympiad to become one of Chicago's foremost arena's for new improvisers. In the late 1980s Charna Halpern and Del Close transformed the Improv Olympiad into the IO, using Del's new improv format called The Harold, otherwise known as long form.

Forsberg retired from teaching in 1993, leaving Players Workshop to her daughter. Her nephew, Martin de Maat had become the creative director of the Second City Training Center which was growing in leaps and bounds, offering a tremendous competition to Players Workshop. In 2003 Players Workshop closed its doors. However, in 2007, she was approached by her old friend and student Bill Murray to help teach the New York Giants improv, in the hopes of giving them an edge. At 86 years old she did just that. It was the first time that she had taught anyone in years. That year they won the Super Bowl. She returned to teach the New York Giants again in 2008.

Forsberg, along with her daughter Linnea, wrote Improvisation for Speech and Theater (Kendall Hunt Publishing, 2010).

== Death ==
Forsberg died on October 3, 2011, at age 90.
