= Stephen Book =

American acting coach, teacher, director, actor, and author

Stephen Jay Book
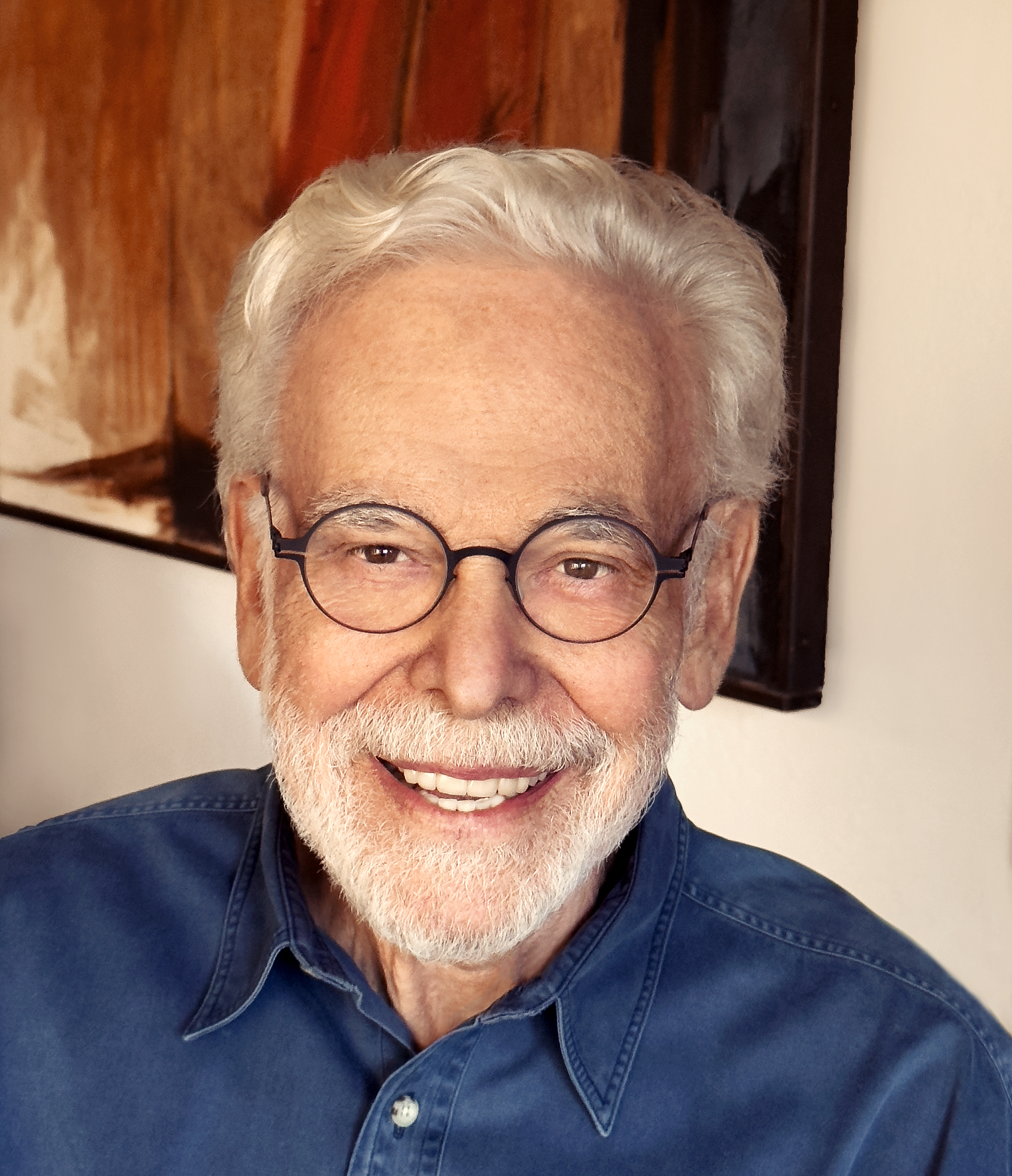
- Book in 2024
- Born: 1945
- Occupations: Acting teacher, coach, director, author
- Years active: 1970-present
- Website: stephenbook.com

Stephen Book (born 1945) is an American acting teacher, director, and author known for his work in theatrical improvisation and for developing the “Improvisation Technique” approach to scripted performance.

He taught and coached industry professionals at the Stephen Book Acting Workshop in Hollywood for nearly 40 years. His notable students include Academy Award winners William Hurt, Rita Moreno, and Robin Williams, as well as comedian George Carlin.

A protégé of Viola Spolin, he co-taught with her and served as the executive director of the Spolin Theater Game Center. Additionally, he was a longtime faculty member at both The Juilliard School and the University of Southern California. As a director, he has helmed productions both Off-Broadway and in regional theaters. Book is the author of several books, including Book on Acting: Improvisation Technique, The Actor Takes a Meeting, and Secret Magic Stuff for Actors.

In 2017, the hosts of the podcast The Actor Chats highlighted his impact on the industry, stating that Book "has taught a whole generation of our best actors."

== Early life ==
Stephen Jay Book was born in 1945 to Perle and Lenny Book and grew up in Yonkers, New York. He graduated from Yonkers' Roosevelt High School in 1963. From a young age, he was interested in the stage, performing as a magician at age 12 and acting in plays during high school. He did not think of becoming an actor professionally until he auditioned for a full-ride scholarship as a drama major at Adelphi University, and to his surprise, won.

=== Education ===
Book was educated at Adelphi, Sarah Lawrence College, and Stanford University. At Sarah Lawrence, he first studied with Viola Spolin and developed a passion for her Theater Games. Another teacher at Sarah Lawrence, Charles Carshon, encouraged Book to pursue directing as well as acting. He subsequently attended Stanford University, where he earned a Master of Fine Arts (M.F.A.) degree in directing in 1970. In the 1970s, he studied with Lee Strasberg in the Directors Unit at the Actors Studio. In 1975, an Actors Studio search committee led by Shelley Winters invited him to become the permanent substitute moderator for Lee Strasberg when Strasberg was out of town. Book decided against it due to philosophical differences with Strasberg's "Method" acting system.

== Career ==
=== As a teacher ===
==== Juilliard, Spolin Theater Game Center, and USC ====
Book's careers as a director and teacher evolved simultaneously starting in the early 1970s. While in New York City beginning his career as a director, Book also began teaching at the American Academy of Dramatic Arts and the Circle in the Square Theatre School, and then he joined the faculty of the Drama Division at Juilliard from 1973 to 1981. During that time, he also taught at Middlebury College's Bread Loaf School of English in Vermont for seven summers, and was a visiting professor at Brown University. He has also taught at Stanford, UCLA, the Esalen Institute, the Globe Shakespeare Center in London, the Russian Institute of Theatre Arts (GITIS) in Moscow and was keynote speaker and workshop leader at the international conference on Modern Methods of the Actor's Psychotechnique at the Stanislavsky Center (Moscow). Besides Spolin and Strasberg, Book has also worked with acting teachers and directors Gerald Hiken, Joseph Chaikin, John Houseman, and Alan Schneider, as well as learning Alba Emoting with neuropsychologist Susana Bloch.

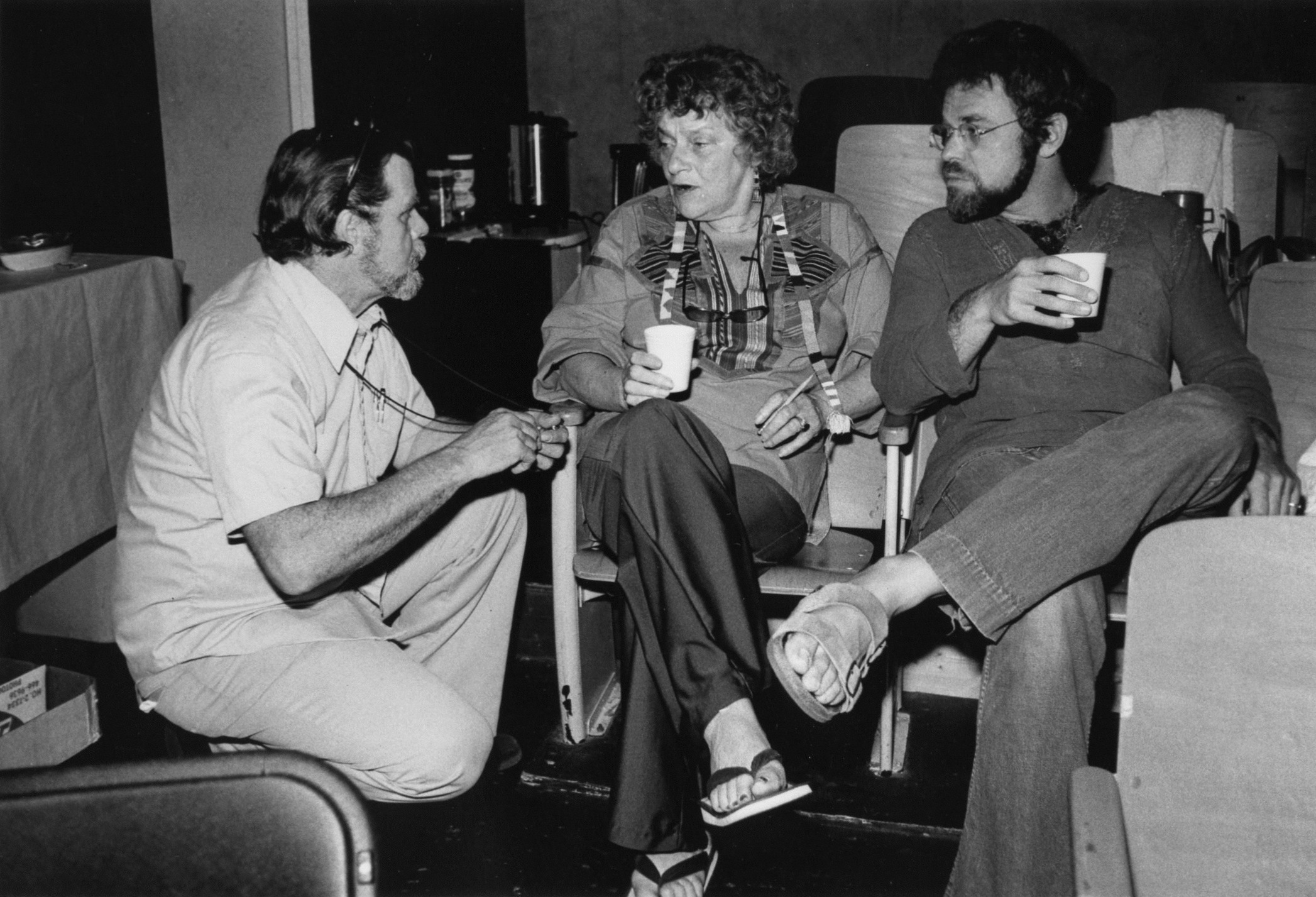
Robert Martin, Viola Spolin, and Stephen Book at the Spolin Theater Game Center in the 1970s

While working with Viola Spolin in the mid-'60s, Book became Spolin's assistant, helping her prepare, and assisting her at workshops. In 1976, the national educational laboratory CEMREL funded the Spolin Theater Game Center in Hollywood as a training site and aesthetic education learning center headed by Spolin based around her method. Spolin served as artistic director, while Book took on the roles of executive director and principal teacher. The center's mission extended beyond improvisational stage acting, using theater games to teach basic classroom curricula and enhance verbal and nonverbal communication skills. This innovative approach quickly spread from traditional classrooms into special education, therapy, senior communities, and prison rehabilitation projects. In addition to the center's programs, Book toured the country leading workshops in the Spolin Theater Games techniques. The participants included educators, artists, therapists, social workers, and other non-actors learning how to use the games in their own classrooms or work settings.

In 1977, John Houseman—former director of the Drama Division at Juilliard—joined the School of Dramatic Arts at the University of Southern California to help elevate its acting and theater training programs. His first hire was Stephen Book, who left the Spolin Center in 1979 and remained on the USC faculty until 1991.

==== Stephen Book Acting Workshop ====
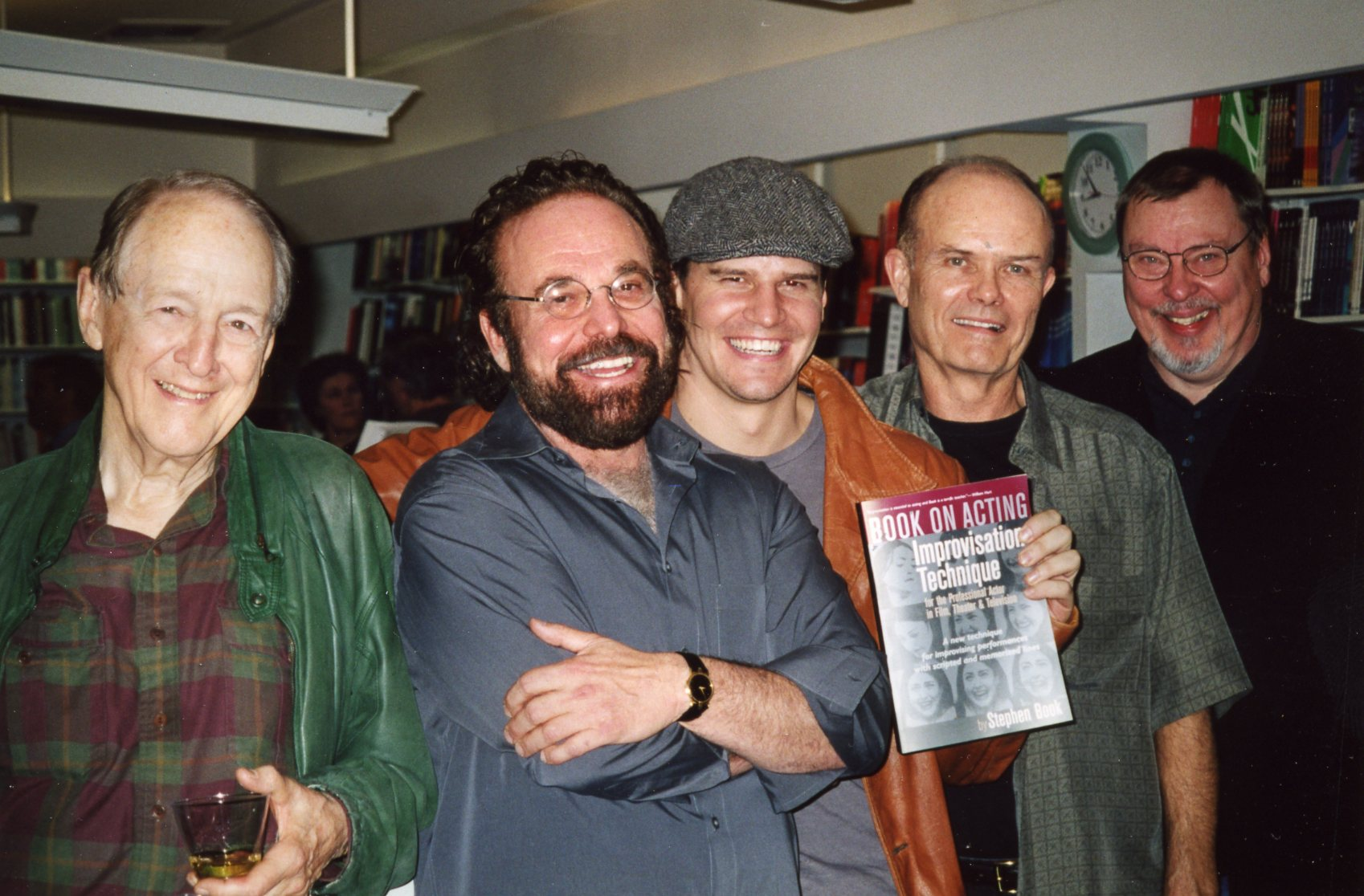
William Schallert, Stephen Book, David Boreanaz, Kurtwood Smith and Larry Drake in 2002

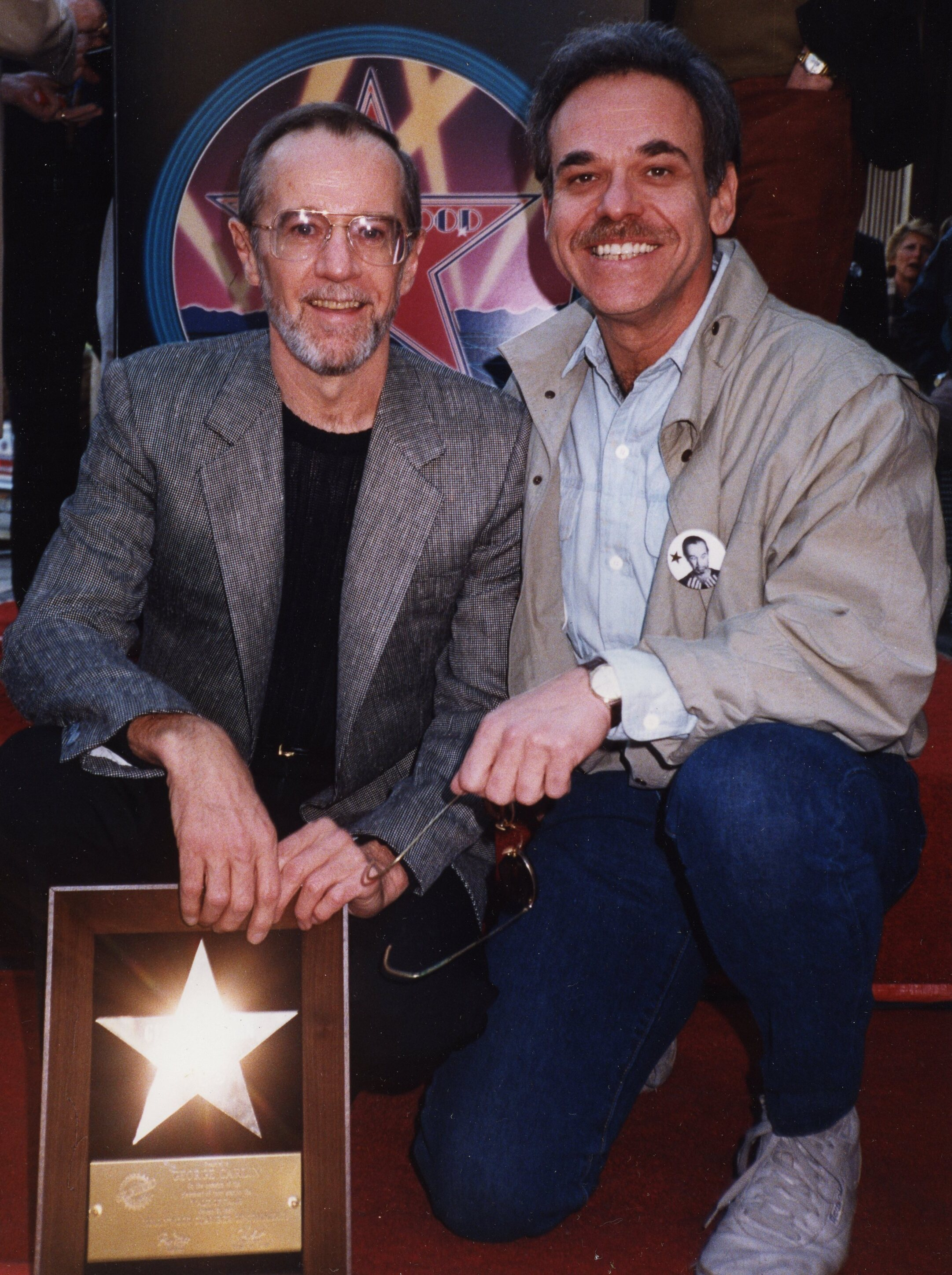
George Carlin and Stephen Book

Book opened his Hollywood studio for professional actors in 1985, teaching his approach to acting, which he calls Improvisation Technique. An expansion of Spolin's ideas, Improvisation Technique stresses the importance of authenticity and spontaneity while serving the purpose of the scene. The technique is a process for improvising a performance while still adhering to the written words of a script. It includes using physicality to create and employ emotions. Kimberley Lewis of Backstage West magazine wrote that Book's approach of working from exterior actions to draw out interior emotions in an actor "places him clearly in the 'anti-Strasberg' camp," since Method acting tries to build a performance from the interior psychology outwards. In Lewis' interview, Book said that "The more you physicalize and show an emotion, the more likely you'll actually feel it." In an interview with the podcast The Actor Chats, he described his technique as "all about spontaneity. ... It's like jazz and basketball. It needs a structure and then it needs a riff."

Book's students include some of the most prestigious performers in Hollywood, including Oscar, Emmy, and Tony-winning actors William Hurt, Rita Moreno, Robin Williams, Val Kilmer, Maura Tierney, Sanaa Lathan, Carla Gugino, Tim Matheson, Valerie Mahaffey, Malcolm-Jamal Warner, David Boreanaz, Kurtwood Smith, Veronica Cartwright, William Schallert, Tate Donovan, Jack Riley, Larry Drake, and Grant Heslov, as well as stand-up comics George Carlin, Christopher Titus, and Adam Ferrara. Williams worked with Book at the Spolin Theater Game Center in 1978 before finding fame in Mork & Mindy. Book was George Carlin's acting teacher and coach starting in the mid-1980s, and became a close friend of the actor and comedian, helping him prepare for roles in movies such as The Prince of Tides and Streets of Laredo. He has also been an acting coach for singers-turned-actors including Randy Travis, Michael Hutchence of INXS, Mindy McCready, and Ozzy Osbourne.

Other instructors at Book's workshop included his former student Larry Drake, best known for winning two Emmy Awards as the character Benny Stulwicz on the television series L.A. Law, who taught there until his death in 2016.

=== As a director, actor, and creative consultant ===
Book has directed productions in New York, regional, and university theaters throughout the United States and abroad, including Circle in the Square Theatre, Washington Theater Club, Los Angeles Actors' Theatre, Stanford Repertory Theater, Equity Library Theater, and New Dramatists, as well as Princeton, Brown, Sarah Lawrence, USC, and the Theater of Dionysus in Athens, Greece. He was also the advance director for the 1967 pre-Broadway tour of The Bashful Genius by Harold Callen, starring Stephen Boyd.

Although Book did not pursue a career as an actor, he performed in numerous stage productions. His early theater credits include a summer stock tour of Never Too Late alongside Dennis O'Keefe and Betty Field, The Fantasticks at the Westchester Playhouse, and at the Stanford Repertory Theater he played Estragon in Waiting for Godot, Ferrovius in Androcles and the Lion, and Pseudolus in the musical A Funny Thing Happened on the Way to the Forum. On the big screen, Book appeared in the 2002 comedy-thriller Poolhall Junkies, with Rod Steiger, Christopher Walken, and Chazz Palminteri.

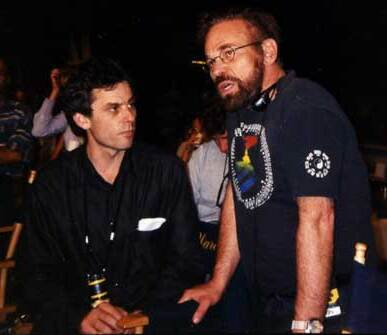
Vincent Ward and Stephen Book on the set of What Dreams May Come

Book has served as creative consultant to a number of different projects, directors, and performers, perhaps most notably to director Vincent Ward on the Oscar-winning 1998 film What Dreams May Come, starring Robin Williams.

He was creative consultant to Melissa Manchester on her 1978 album Don’t Cry Out Loud, which won a Grammy nomination for Best Pop Female Vocal Performance. He was the creative consultant on the Comedy Central series pilot Special Unit, directed by Bryan Cranston, and Chris Bowman's 2007 comedy American Fork.

=== Books ===
Book has written three books on the craft of acting and the business of being an actor, all published by Silman-James Press.

His first, Book on Acting: Improvisation Technique For The Professional Actor In Film, Theater & Television, was published in 2002. In it, Book presents the theory, training, and practice of Improvisation Technique, which stresses the importance of spontaneity within the bounds of scripted lines. The technique includes improvisation skills for enhancing character, emotions, conflict, agreement, and improving the actor's audition process. Also included is Book's process for breaking down scripted scenes into improvisation choices. Writing about Book on Acting for Backstage West, Jean Schiffman noted that Book "challenges some of the received wisdom of modern American training and offers a practical method to infuse a performance with spontaneity." In her book Acting For Young Actors, Mary Lou Belli recommended Book on Acting for its "unique approach," especially for advanced actors. Book on Acting was also translated and published in Poland as Handbook for Actors.

His second book, 2006's The Actor Takes a Meeting, covers the topic of interviews with casting directors, agents, managers, and other important figures, and offers advice on how an actor can avoid coming across as inauthentic or manipulative due to nervousness, self-consciousness, or fear. The book grew out of a series of workshops he began with his students in 1992. Reviewing the book for Backstage West, Paul Haber wrote that "Book so beautifully articulates the psychology behind the interview process that I heartily recommend his book to every actor I know." Backstage also listed The Actor Takes a Meeting as an essential book for actors. Reviewing the book for the University of Pennsylvania, J. Michael DeAngelis called it a "fascinating" and "very unique book that takes a look at a side of the acting business that is sometimes overlooked."

His most recent book is Secret Magic Stuff for Actors, published in 2025. Book offers a series of specific and alternative solutions to 44 problems commonly encountered by actors, such as transitioning from one emotion to another, quickly changing to the director's vision of the character, or improving audition self-tapes. Also included are seven useful tools that enable actors to instantly create the emotions of their choice, think spontaneously as the character instead of for the character, and discover the characters physicality, personality, and essence. In his preface, Book writes that his intention was to break away from impractical theory and offer practical "tools you can take to the set." In an interview with New York radio station WBAI, host Janet Coleman said that even though Secret Magic Stuff was written for specific needs of actors, she found the book's advice useful to her personally despite not being an actor, noting that "regular people have to act an awful lot in regular life."

== Bibliography ==
- Book on Acting: Improvisation Technique For The Professional Actor In Film, Theater & Television (Silman-James Press, 2002)
- The Actor Takes a Meeting: How To Interview Successfully With Agents, Managers, Producers, and Casting Directors (Silman-James Press, 2006)
- Secret Magic Stuff For Actors: Solutions For Almost Every Situation (Silman-James Press, 2025)
