= David Shepherd (producer) =

American producer, director and actor

- Born: October 10, 1924; New York, New York
- Died: December 17, 2018 (aged 94)
- Occupations: producer Improv coach/teacher director
- Years active: 1950–2018
- Notable work: Playwrights Theatre Club; Compass Players; Canadian Improv Games; ImprovOlympic
- Spouse: Suzanne Shepherd (m. 1957; div. 1966)

David Gwynne Shepherd (10 October 1924 – 17 December 2018) was an American producer, director, and actor noted for his innovative work in improvisational theatre. He founded and/or co-founded the Playwrights Theatre Club, The Compass Players, the Canadian Improv Games, and the ImprovOlympic.

== Early life and education ==
Born in 1924 in New York City to an old money family, Shepherd grew up with left-leaning sensibilities. He was the son of Louise Tracy (Butler) and William Edgar Shepherd, an architect. His paternal grandmother was the sister of socialite Alice Claypoole Vanderbilt.

He studied English at Harvard and received an M.A. in the History of Theater at Columbia. Disenchanted with what he perceived as a European dominated theater on the East Coast, Shepherd gravitated to the Midwest.

== Career ==
=== Playwrights Theatre Club ===
In 1953, Shepherd co-founded the company along with Paul Sills and Eugene Troobnick, of the Playwrights Theatre Club in Chicago. The theatre was noted for its original treatment of classic plays as well as original works. Other members and participants included Elaine May, Sheldon Patinkin, Rolf Forsberg, Mike Nichols, Joyce Piven, Josephine Forsberg, Ed Asner, and Barbara Harris. The Playwright's Theatre Club led to the creation of the Compass Players and later the Second City.

=== Compass Players ===
In 1955, Shepherd and Paul Sills founded The Compass Players, the forerunner of The Second City. Compass launched the careers of Mike Nichols, Elaine May, Jerry Stiller, Alan Alda, Alan Arkin, Barbara Harris, and Shelley Berman (to name a few) and started a revolution in entertainment.

In Mark Siska's documentary Compass Cabaret ’55, about the birth of modern improvisation, Shepherd stated his reasons for founding the Compass Players: “Theater in New York was very effete and based on three-act plays and based on verbiage and there was not much action. I wanted to create a theater that would drag people off the street and seat them not in rows but at tables and give them something to drink, which was unheard of in [American] theater.”

The Compass eventually opened in St. Louis, Philadelphia, New York, and Washington.

=== Community Makers ===
In 1971, Shepherd established the Community Makers in New York City. Assisted by Howard Jerome Gomberg, the organization was created to correct ailing communities by using improvisation as a people’s theatre, and was housed at the Space for Innovative Development, 344 W. 36th Street, New York.

=== Responsive Scene radio show ===
In 1972, Shepherd produced the Responsive Scene radio show which aired on WRVR-FM, a public radio station owned and operated by the Riverside Church in New York City. Responsive Scene was an hour-long improvised show with professional actors performing from call-in suggestions from their audience of over 40,000 listeners.

=== The Improvisation Olympics ===
In 1972 at the Space for Innovative Development, Shepherd and Howard Jerome Gomberg created the Improvisation Olympics, a competitive theatrical sporting event. The event placed competing teams of improvisers on stage in front of a live audience, with performances taped for future replays. The format was refined by Toronto's Homemade Theatre Company in 1974. In 1981, Shepherd returned to Chicago, producing the Improvisation Olympics and the Jonah Complex with Charna Halpern, who later went on to form i.O. with Del Close.

=== Life-Play ===
Shepherd resided near Amherst, Massachusetts. There, he developed a new improvisational format known as Life-Play, which consists of improvised games that can be played over the phone. According to Shepherd, If you called him on a specific number, he would provide a short training session and then introduce you to the phone team, often national participants.

== Legacy ==
Shepherd received lifetime achievement awards from the Chicago Improv Festival, Second City, and the Canadian Improv Games.

In 2010, the documentary David Shepherd: A Lifetime of Improvisational Theatre was completed. It is an oral history detailing Shepherd's career and contributions to improvisational theatre. It was directed by Mike Fly and written by Michael Golding. The documentary includes interviews with past and present associates such as Bernie Sahlins, Suzanne Shepherd, and Janet Coleman.

In 2014, Compass Cabaret 55, a documentary about the birth of modern theatrical improvisation directed by Mark Siska, also details the career of Shepherd and his contributions to improvisational movement. Besides Shepherd, the interviewees include Bernie Sahlins, Janet Coleman, Jeffrey Sweet, and Compass veterans such as Ed Asner, Suzanne Shepherd, and Sheldon Patinkin.

The Canadian Improv Games (CIG) is an education-based format of improvisational theatre for Canadian high schools. To participate in the games, high school students form teams of up to 8 players and are required to pay a registration fee (if their school is not able to cover the cost). The teams compete in regional tournaments, organized and coordinated by regional Canadian Improv Games volunteers. Players perform improvised scenes, fueled by suggestions provided by the audience. Each scene is judged based on a fixed rubric. The winning team from each region proceeds to the National Festival and Tournament held in Ottawa. The National Arts Centre is a major sponsor of the Canadian Improv Games. The National Arts Centre is the site of the National Festival and Ottawa Tournament. The Games were created by Jamie "Willie" Wyllie and Howard Jerome Gomberg, based on Shepherd's and Gomberg's Improvisation Olympics.

== Death ==
Shepherd died on 17 December 2018, at the age of 94.

== Bibliography ==
Shepherd, David (2005). That Movie in Your Head: Guide to improvising stories on video. Shutesbury, MA: Gere Publishing. pp. 202 pages. ISBN 0-9743995-0-7.
