= Martin de Maat =

American theater director (1949–2001)

Martin de Maat (January 12, 1949 – February 15, 2001) was a teacher and artistic director at The Second City in Chicago. He also taught at Columbia College and Players Workshop. He studied under Viola Spolin. De Maat and Del Close were the two main figures of the Chicago improvisational comedy scene in the late 80's and throughout the 1990s.

De Maat began working at The Second City as a teenager washing dishes in the kitchen and began teaching classes at The Second City for his aunt, Josephine Forsberg, when he was 18 years old. He instantly became a favorite teacher at The Second City, as well as supporting the shows by doing lights and stage managing. He studied theater at the University of Iowa and would much later receive a PhD from National University in Kanpur in communication arts. In 1974 he moved to New York City, where he became a very successful director and art director in both theater and film. During this period Martin returned to Chicago every summer to teach improv for his aunt's new school, Players Workshop, which acted as The Second City's unofficial training program. In 1984 Martin returned to Chicago semi-permanently and began to teach improv full-time at the Players Workshop, helping his aunt, Josephine Forsberg to develop the school. About that time, friend and colleague Sheldon Patinkin asked Martin to join the staff of the recently created The Second City Training Center, the theater's official improv training program. In 1985 Martin became its artistic director and led the development of the acting, writing and improvisation programs for the next 15 years, making it the biggest and most successful improv training program in the country. Martin became well known as a transformative and empowering teacher, who greeted his students with a hug and referred to The Second City as their home. He was not only an improv comedy teacher to them but also a life counselor and a father figure who helped to guide them to get in touch with their creativity and give up their restrictive ways of thinking.

Martin de Maat died on February 15, 2001, of complications from pneumonia. Always a very private person in the public eye, he never revealed his age. The Chicago Sun-Times published it in his obituary at "around 52." It also came as a shock to many that knew him that he had been living with AIDS for several years. After his death, he received many honors and memorials, especially in Chicago, New York and Los Angeles where many of his students and colleagues teach, direct and perform. At The Second City Training Center in Chicago in the early 2000s, an ongoing performance series was named in his honor, The de Maat Showcase. A plaque in his honor hangs on the wall at the training center.

In 2009, the de Maat Studio Theater was opened in his honor at The Second City in Chicago.

Some of Martin de Maat's students over the years include: Mick Napier, Chris Farley, Tim Meadows, Scott Adsit, Rachel Dratch, Sean Hayes, Tina Fey, and a young David Mamet.
