= Canadian Improv Games =

Improvisational event for high school students

The Canadian Improv Games (CIG) is a national charity dedicated to providing Canadian youth with improvisational theatre education and programming. It is one of the largest and most geographically dispersed theatre festivals in Canada with 14 regional programs and over 100,000 alumni participants. The winning team from each region proceeds to the National Festival and Tournament held in Ottawa at the National Arts Centre. The CIG also offers workshops, training, and week-long summer camps throughout the year.

== History ==
The Canadian Improv Games got its start in Ottawa in 1977. It was created by Jamie "Willie" Wyllie and Howard Jerome, based on a concept originally conceived by David Shepherd and Howard Jerome. With the efforts of Willie and Johnson Moretti, by the 1990s the games had become so popular they were given hour long live coverage on YTV.

== Events ==
Teams perform five events in the Canadian Improv Games: Life, Character, Style, Story and Theme.

Life
A sincere scene that honestly represents the reality of a situation.
Story
A scene that tells an original story with the use of narration. The story must have a beginning, middle and ending but it does not need to be in chronological order.
Character
A scene featuring an original character. Teams create an original character(s) through physicality and voice.
Theme
An exploration of a theme given by the referee.
Style
A scene that recreates a style. This is done by drawing on the distinctive features and common elements of a recognized style or genre of performance.

== Regions ==
- Alberta
- Halifax
- Kingston
- Moncton
- Montreal
- St John's
- Ottawa
- Regina
- Sudbury
- Greater Toronto
- Tri-City Area (Waterloo Municipality)
- Vancouver (Lower Mainland)
- Vancouver Island
- Winnipeg
- Online Tournament

== The Oath ==
At the beginning of every night of play, the referee leads everyone in the Oath which reminds players and audience members about the core values of the Canadian Improv Games.

We have come together
In the spirit of loving competition,
To celebrate the Canadian Improv Games.
We promise to uphold the ideals of improvisation,
To co-operate with one another,
To learn from each other,
To commit ourselves to the moment,
And above all,
To Have A Good Time!

== Notable alumni ==
Notable alumni of the Canadian Improv Games include Sandra Oh, Seth Rogen, Nathan Fielder, Alanis Morissette, Tatiana Maslany, Mark Little, Picnicface and Andrew Phung.
