= Bernard Sahlins =

American theatre director (1922 – 2013)

Bernard Sahlins (/ˈsɑːlɪnz/; August 20, 1922 – June 16, 2013) was an American writer, director and comedian best known as a founder of The Second City improvisational comedy troupe with Paul Sills and Howard Alk in 1959. Sahlins also opened the Second City Theatre in Toronto in 1973.

== Biography ==
Born in Chicago, Sahlins graduated from University of Chicago in 1943. His brother was anthropologist Marshall Sahlins.

When Sahlins received an honorary doctorate from Columbia College Chicago in 2006, theatre department professor Sheldon Patinkin wrote:

In 1953, he became a producer of Playwrights Theatre Club, the first professional theater company in Chicago in many years. It featured such budding actors and directors as Ed Asner, Mike Nichols, Elaine May, Paul Sills, and Byrne and Joyce Piven. In 1956, he took over the empty downtown Studebaker Theatre and did a year of plays which included the Chicago premiere of Waiting for Godot and then in 1959, with Paul Sills and Howard Alk, he opened The Second City where Bernie remained as producer and, eventually, one of the directors until the 1990s. Among the many talents he hired are John and James Belushi, John Candy, Dan Aykroyd, Gilda Radner, Harold Ramis and Bill Murray. Bernie was also one of the developers and producers of the acclaimed TV show SCTV.

In 1986, Sahlins co-founded both The University of Chicago's Off-Off Campus and The International Theatre Festival of Chicago. Sahlins is the recipient of The Sergel prize for playwriting, The University of Chicago Professional Achievement Award, The Chicago Drama League’s Professional Achievement Award, Joseph Jefferson Awards for directing and professional achievement, The Illinois Arts Alliance "Legend" award, and the Improv Festival Achievement Award.

On June 16, 2013, Sahlins died at his home of pancreatic cancer at age 90. Survivors include his wife of 44 years, Jane Nicholl Sahlins, and a brother, Marshall Sahlins, both of Chicago. His first marriage to Fritzi Sager ended in divorce. A daughter from his first marriage, Lee Sherry, died in 2012.

== Bibliography ==
- Bernard Sahlins, Ivan R. Dee (Editor) (2001). Days and Nights at Second City. ISBN 1-56663-375-3
- Tristan Remy and Bernard Sahlins, Ivan R. Dee (Editor) (1997). Clown Scenes. ISBN 1-56663-144-0
- Pierre Augustin Caron de Beaumarchais and Bernard Sahlins (1990) The Marriage of Figaro: In a New Translation and Adaptation. Ivan R. Dee Publisher. ISBN 978-1-56663-066-5
- Bernard Sahlins, Molière (1999). The Bourgeois Gentleman (A Play). Samuel French ASIN B000MWX09E
- Bernard Sahlins (2000). The Mysteries: Creation: A New Adaptation. Ivan R. Dee, Publisher; New Ed edition. ISBN 978-1-56663-005-4
- Bernard Sahlins (1993). The Mysteries: The Passion. Ivan R. Dee, Publisher; New Ed edition. ISBN 978-1-56663-024-5
