= Neva Boyd =

American sociologist

Neva Leona Boyd
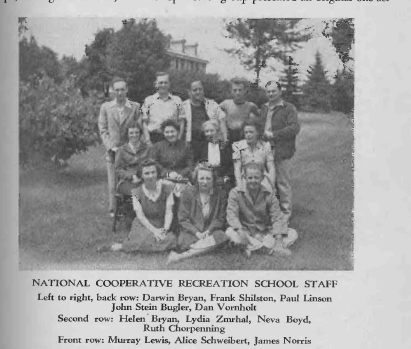
- Neva Boyd together with staff, summer 1942
- Born: February 25, 1876; Sanborn, Iowa, U.S.
- Died: November 21, 1963 (aged 87); Chicago, Illinois, U.S.
- Occupation: Sociologist

Academic background
- Education: Chicago Kindergarten Institute now National Louis University

Academic work
- Institutions: Hull House; City of Chicago Park Commission; Northwestern University; University of Chicago
- Main interests: Recreational Therapy
- Notable works: Handbook of Recreational Games
- Influenced: Viola Spolin; William C. Menninger

Neva Leona Boyd (February 25, 1876 in Sanborn, Iowa – November 21, 1963 in Chicago) was an American sociologist. She founded the Recreational Training School at the Hull House in Chicago. The school taught a one-year educational program in group games, gymnastics, dancing, dramatic arts, play theory, and social problems. She was on the faculty of Northwestern University from 1927 to 1941.

== Biography ==
Born in 1876 in Iowa, Boyd moved to Chicago after high school. She enrolled in the Chicago Kindergarten Institute (now National Louis University) and eventually arrived at Hull House, a settlement house for European immigrants. She taught kindergarten in Buffalo, New York, before returning in 1908 to attend the University of Chicago.

The Chicago Park Commission hired Boyd as a social worker, specifically to organize social clubs, direct dramatics, supervise social dances and play activities. At Hull House, Neva Boyd ran movement and recreational groups for children. She used games and improvisation to teach language skills, problem-solving, self-confidence and social skills. During the Great Depression, Boyd worked with the Recreational Project in the Works Progress Administration, (WPA). In 1927, Boyd accepted Northwestern University's invitation to move The Chicago Training School for Playground Workers from Hull House to its own Department of Sociology. Boyd became a sociology and theatre professor at the University of Chicago and is one of the founders of the Recreational Therapy and Educational Drama movements in the U.S.

Boyd also worked in military convalescent homes. The Red Cross, which established these convalescent houses, ensured that all wounded veterans engaged in playful games to prepare them for leaving the hospital. By the 1940s, Boyd's methods found their ways into every military hospital in the country.

Colonel William C. Menninger, co-founder of the Menninger Foundation, an internationally known center for treatment of behavioral disorders and Viola Spolin, originator of Theater Games improvisational theater techniques, were two of her students.

== Books published ==
- Old Square Dances of America by N. Boyd e Tressie M. Dunlavy (1932, 2007)
- Handbook of Recreational Games (1975). Dover Publications facsimile reprint of Handbook of Games (1945), see below ISBN 0-486-23204-2
- Play and game theory in group work: A collection of papers by Neva Leona Boyd por N. Boyd e Paul Simon (1971)
- Social group work: A definition with a methodological note de Neva Leona Boyd, (1971). Ed Jane Addams Graduate School of Social Work, University of Illinois at Chicago Circle
- Social group work;: A definition with a methodological note (1949)
- Handbook of games (1945)
- Home games: A collection of games Neva Leona Boyd (1942)
- Group work experiments in state institutions. In Proceedings of the National Conference on Social Work (pp. 339–345). Chicago: University of Chicago Press. (1935).
- Folk Games and Gymnastic Play for Kindergarten, Primary, and Playground Dayny, and Neva L. Boyd Pedersen (1914, 1932)
- Hospital and bedside games (1930, 1945)
- Schoolroom games (1932)
- Outline for recording on clubs and dramatic groups (1932)
- Hospital and Bedside Games (1919)
- Old English and American Games for School and Playground by Florence Warren and Boyd, Neva L. Brown (Paperback - 1915)
- Folk Games of Denmark and Sweden for School, Playground and Social Center Dagny and Boyd, Neva L. Pedersen (1915)
