= Compass Players =

1950s theatrical group

Original announcement in Chicago's Hyde Park Herald shows first performance scheduled for Friday, July 8, 1955 at The Compass tavern, formerly at 1152 E. 55th (not to be confused with Jimmy's Woodlawn Tap to the east).

The Compass Players (or Compass Theater) was an improvisational cabaret revue active from 1955 to 1958 in Chicago and St. Louis. Several members went on to form The Second City Theater in 1959.

== History ==
Founded by David Shepherd, the original idea was to produce a new play derived through improvisation from outlines (in the tradition of the Italian commedia dell'arte) or scenarios written by members of the ensemble. Shepherd turned to director Paul Sills to head this venture based on his experience working with Sills on an earlier Chicago theater effort, the Playwrights' Theatre Company. He noticed that Sills in rehearsal employed improvisational theater forms called Theater Games, structures designed to create spontaneous theatrical play between actors that had been developed and named by Sills' mother, Viola Spolin. (Spolin would later author the "bible" of Theater Games, Improvisation for the Theater, published by Northwestern Press.)

Starting July 8, 1955, and for the first several weeks, the company presented original improvised plays from outlines they had already created. This was performed in a space in the back room of The Compass, a bar near the University of Chicago campus in Hyde Park, on the present site of the Engine 60 fire station at the northeast corner of 55th Street and University Avenue. The premiere night, six performers were directed by Sills: Elaine May, David Shepherd, Robert Coughlan, Loretta Chiljian, Sid Lazard, and Roger Bowen. The first performance was Sills' "The Game of Hurt." The show was reprised by Shepherd 50 years later at the University of Chicago.

Initially, scenes were presented only once, but some of the players grew interested in polishing material into finished pieces. Mike Nichols and Elaine May created many of their signature scenes in this manner. Shelley Berman found that he could create solo routines by showing one half of telephone conversations.

The Compass moved from its Hyde Park home to two subsequent places that were more nightclubs than theaters, and the tone of the material changed to accommodate the new audiences. When the company ended, some members joined a Compass troupe at the Crystal Palace in St. Louis under the supervision of Theodore J. Flicker. It was here that company members Mike Nichols, Elaine May, Del Close and Flicker codified a further set of principles to guide improvisational players. Close spent the rest of his life developing, refining, and experimenting with these principles.

Shortly afterward, Nichols and May went to New York and swiftly became stars performing material largely derived from their Compass days. Berman, too, soon became a star with his phone calls. In Chicago, Paul Sills had a hunch that a more disciplined version of the Compass might succeed. The successor troupe, The Second City, debuted in 1959, the self-mocking name taken from the title of an article about Chicago by A. J. Liebling that had appeared in The New Yorker magazine in 1952. Several of that troupe's members were recruited from Compass alumni.

== Notable alumni ==
- Alan Alda
- Jane Alexander
- Rose Arrick
- Ed Asner
- Sandy Baron
- Shelley Berman
- Loretta Chiljian
- Del Close
- Bob Coughlan
- Severn Darden
- Bob Dishy
- Andrew Duncan
- Theodore J. Flicker
- Barbara Gordon
- Mark Gordon
- Valerie Harper
- Barbara Harris
- Linda Lavin
- Ron Leibman
- Elaine May
- Anne Meara
- Mike Nichols
- Byrne Piven
- Joyce Hiller Piven
- David Shepherd
- Yuki Shimoda
- Paul Sills
- Jerry Stiller

== See also ==
- Improvisational theatre
- List of improvisational theatre companies
