= Paul Sills =

American director and instructor

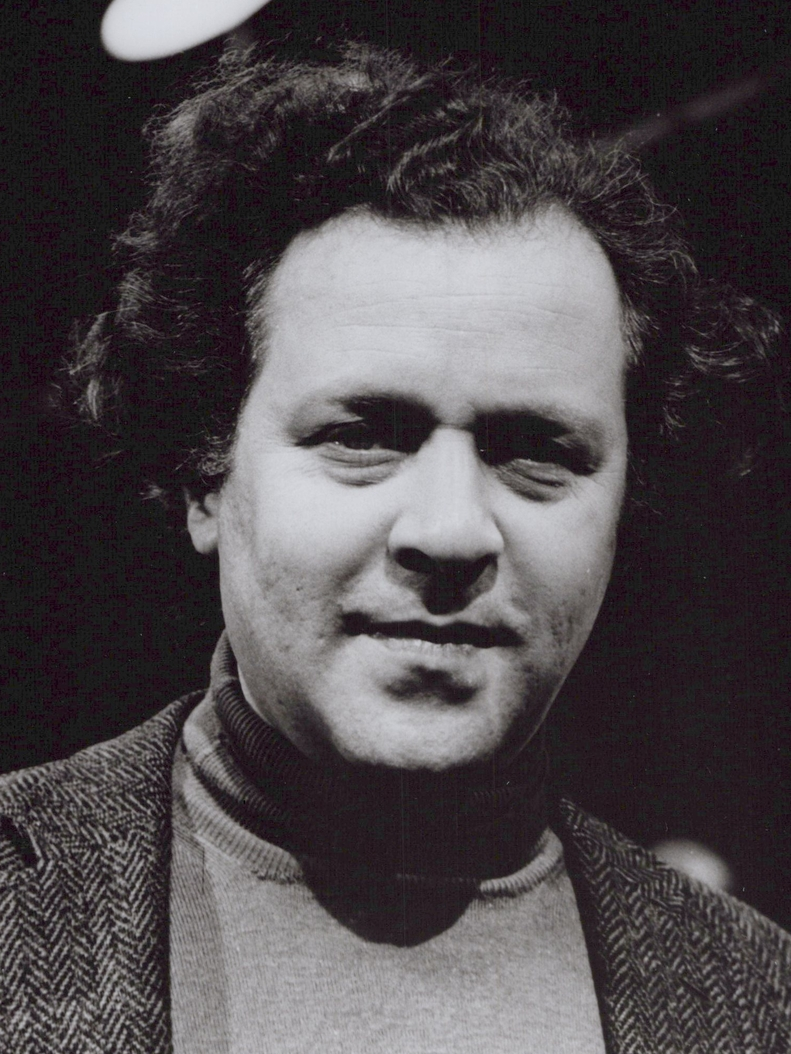
- Sills in 1969
- Born: Paul Silverberg; November 18, 1927; Chicago, Illinois, U.S.
- Died: June 2, 2008 (aged 80); Baileys Harbor, Wisconsin, U.S.
- Education: University of Chicago
- Occupations: Director, teacher
- Known for: Founding Director of The Second City; creator of Story Theater
- Board member of: The Second City, Founded or co-founded: Playwrights Theater Club, Compass Players, The Second City, Game Theater, Story Theater, Sills & Co., Paul Sills' Wisconsin Theater Game Center, The Parents School
- Spouse(s): Barbara Harris (m. 1955; div. 1958) Carol Bleackley Sills (m. 1960)
- Children: 5
- Parent(s): Viola Spolin and Wilmer Silverberg
- Awards: Theater Hall of Fame
- Website: paulsills.com

Paul Sills (born Paul Silverberg; November 18, 1927 – June 2, 2008) was an American director and improvisation teacher, and the original director of Chicago's The Second City.

== Life and career ==
Sills was born Paul Silverberg in Chicago, Illinois, to a family who believed in the teachings of modern-day Judaism. His mother was teacher and writer Viola Spolin, who authored the first book on improvisation techniques, Improvisation for the Theater. Spolin in turn was the student of play therapy theorist Neva Boyd.

In 1948, Sills enrolled in the University of Chicago, where he established himself as a director, co-founding Playwright's Theater Club. There, with fellow actors Edward Asner, Byrne Piven and Zohra Lampert, they blended Spolin's improvisational techniques with established theater training.

In 1955, Sills and David Shepherd founded the Compass Players, the first improvisational theater in the United States, where he directed Shelley Berman, Mike Nichols and Elaine May. In 1959, Sills, along with partners Howard Alk and Bernie Sahlins, opened a theatre called The Second City where revues developed improvisationally were presented under Sills's direction. With early cast members Alan Arkin, Barbara Harris, Severn Darden, Mina Kolb and Paul Sand, success led to New York (a brief run on Broadway and a long one off-Broadway), London and world recognition.

== Career ==
Sills left Second City in 1965 to form the Game Theater, where he coached improvisational techniques of his mother, Viola Spolin, in performance, and audience participation was encouraged. His mother and other community friends were partners. The Parents School was co-founded there, with wife Carol Bleackley Sills and others, with a children's curriculum based on group art forms and play. It operated for almost two decades. At the Game Theater, he also discovered a new form he called Story Theater, which debuted at 1848 N. Wells Street, during the summer of 1968. That building was the original location of the Second City, which had already moved to its new and current location at 1616 N. Wells St. After Sills finished doing Story Theater there, it was torn down. Story Theatre went on to play at the Yale Repertory Theatre, in Los Angeles and on Broadway, remaining the form Sills explored for the rest of his life. His book, Paul Sills' Story Theater: Four Shows.

In 1997, Sills taught “Spolin Games” as part of the workshop program at the Big Stinkin' International Improv & Sketch Comedy Festival in Austin, Texas.

Sills's first two wives were Dorothea Horton and Barbara Harris.

In 2011, he was posthumously inducted into the American Theater Hall of Fame.

== Death ==
Paul Sills died on June 2, 2008, at the age of 80, at his home in Baileys Harbor, Wisconsin, of complications from pneumonia.
