= The Second City Training Center =

North American improv theater educational institution

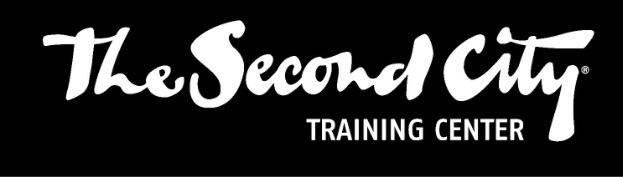

The Second City Training Center was founded in the mid-1980s to facilitate the growing demand for workshops and instruction from the Second City theatre. The Training Centers are located in Chicago and Toronto. Satellite Centers formerly existed in Metro Detroit, Las Vegas, Cleveland, New York City and Los Angeles.

== History ==
The Training Center developed from earlier Second City teaching programs, including the Players Workshop, which Second City later described as its unofficial training program before the creation of the official Second City Training Center. Martin de Maat, who had taught improvisation at the Players Workshop, joined the staff of the recently created Training Center after being asked by Sheldon Patinkin. In 1985, de Maat became artistic director and led the development of the Training Center's acting, writing, and improvisation programs for the next fifteen years. Michael J. Gellman, founding member and senior faculty member of the Training Center, later served as program head for IFA, Advanced Studies, and Specialty Classes, and as director of the New York Training Center.

Former Training Center students include Steve Carell, Tina Fey, Scott Adsit, Anders Holm, Amy Poehler, Cecily Strong, Mike Myers, Chris Farley, Tim Meadows, Bonnie Hunt, Stephen Colbert, Halle Berry, Sean Hayes, Jon Favreau, Hinton Battle, Jack McBrayer, Dave Foley, Kevin McDonald and Josh Willis.

The Chicago Training Center facility was later dedicated to de Maat and features a plaque bearing one of his best-known quotes, "You are pure potential."

The Second City Training Centers currently operate under the leadership of Kevin Frank (Artistic Director, Toronto), Nancy Hayden (Artistic Director, Chicago) and Kerry Sheehan (President, Second City Training Centers). The Artistic Director of the now closed Hollywood facility was Joshua Funk.
