= Viola Spolin =

American academic and acting theorist

- Book cover featuring Spolin
- Born: Viola Mills; November 7, 1906; Chicago, Illinois, U.S.
- Died: November 22, 1994 (aged 88); Los Angeles, California, U.S.
- Occupations: Teacher, author
- Known for: Improvisational theater
- Spouse: Wilmer Silverberg
- Children: 2, including Paul Sills

Viola Spolin (November 7, 1906 — November 22, 1994) was an American theatre academic, educator and acting coach. She is considered an important innovator in 20th century American theater for creating directorial techniques to help actors to be focused in the present moment and to find choices improvisationally, as if in real life. These acting exercises she later called Theater Games and formed the first body of work that enabled other directors and actors to create improvisational theater. Her book Improvisation for the Theater, which published these techniques, includes her philosophy and her teaching and coaching methods, and is considered the "bible of improvisational theater". Spolin's contributions were seminal to the improvisational theater movement in the U.S. She is considered to be the mother of Improvisational theater. Her work has influenced American theater, television and film by providing new tools and techniques that are now used by actors, directors and writers.

Spolin influenced the first generation of improvisational actors at the Second City in Chicago in the mid- to late 1950s, through her son, Paul Sills. He was the founding director of the Compass Players which led to the formation of the Second City. He used her techniques in the training and direction of the company, which enabled them to create satirical improvisational theater about current social & political issues. Spolin also taught workshops for Second City actors, as well as for the general public. Paul Sills and the success of the Second City were largely responsible for the popularization of improvisational theater, which became best known as a comedy form called "improv." Many actors, writers and directors grew out of that school of theater and had formative experiences performing and being trained at the Second City. Many notable theater, television and film professionals were influenced by Spolin and Sills.

Spolin developed acting exercises or "games" that unleashed creativity, adapting focused "play" to unlock the individual's capacity for creative self-expression. Viola Spolin's use of recreational games in theater came from her background with the Works Progress Administration during the Great Depression where she studied with Neva Boyd starting in 1924. Spolin also taught classes at Jane Addams' Hull House in Chicago.

She authored a number of texts on improvisation. Her first and most famous was Improvisation for the Theater, published by Northwestern University Press. This book has become a classic resource for improvisational actors, directors and teachers. It has been published in three editions in 1963, 1983 and 1999.

== Early work ==
Viola Spolin initially trained to be a settlement worker (from 1924 to 1927), studying at Neva Boyd's Group Work School in Chicago. Boyd's innovative teaching in the areas of group leadership, recreation, and social group work strongly influenced Spolin, as did the use of traditional game structures to affect social behavior in inner-city and immigrant children. While serving as drama supervisor for the Chicago branch of the Works Progress Administration's Recreational Project (1939–1941), Spolin perceived a need to create within the WPA drama program an easily grasped system of theater training that could cross the cultural and ethnic barriers of the immigrant children with whom she worked.

According to Spolin, Boyd's teachings provided "an extraordinary training in the use of games, story-telling, folk dance and dramatics as tools for stimulating creative expression in both children and adults, through self discovery and personal experiencing." Building upon the experience of Boyd's work, she responded by developing new games that focused on individual creativity, adapting and focusing the concept of play to unlock the individual's capacity for creative self-expression. These techniques were later to be formalized under the rubric "Theater Games".

Spolin acknowledged she was influenced by J.L. Moreno, originator of the therapeutic techniques known as psychodrama and sociodrama. Spolin's exercises had a therapeutic impact on players. She drew on Moreno's idea of using audience suggestions as the base of an improvisation, which became a hallmark of the Second City's brand of improv and is now universally employed in workshop and performance. She strongly emphasized the need for the individual to overcome what she called "The Approval/Disapproval Syndrome," which she described as the performer blocking their own natural creativity in an effort to please the audience, director, teacher, peers or anyone else.

== Birth of American improv ==
In 1946, Spolin founded the Young Actors Company in Hollywood. Children six years of age and older were trained, through the medium of the still developing Theater Games system, to perform in productions. This company continued until 1955. Spolin returned to Chicago in 1955 to direct for the Playwright's Theater Club and, subsequently, to conduct games workshops with the Compass Players, the country's first professional improvisational acting company. The Compass Players made theater history in America. It began in the backroom of a bar near the University of Chicago campus in the summer of 1955 and out of this group was born a new form: improvisational theater. They are said to have created a radically new kind of comedy. "They did not plan to be funny or to change the course of comedy", writes Janet Coleman. "But that is what happened."

From 1960 to 1965, still in Chicago, she worked with her son Paul Sills as workshop director for the Second City Company and continued to teach and develop Theater Games theory and practice. As an outgrowth of this work, she published Improvisation for the Theater, consisting of approximately 220 games and exercises. It has become a classic reference text for teachers of acting, as well as for educators in other fields.

In the early-1960s Viola Spolin took on an assistant and protégé, Josephine Forsberg, to help with her workshops at the Second City, as well as with her children's theatre that performed there on weekends. Viola Spolin eventually handed both the children's show and the improv classes over to Forsberg, who continued teaching Spolin's work at the Second City from the mid-1960s on, leading to the creation of Forsberg's own improv school, Players Workshop in 1971, as well as the Improv Olympic and the Second City Training Center in the 1980s, all of which were based on Spolin's work.

In 1965, with Sills and others, Spolin co-founded the Game Theater in Chicago, and around the same time organized a small cooperative kindergarten and elementary school (called Playroom School and later Parents School) for with several other families in the Old Town/Lincoln Park area. The theater and the school's classes sought to have audiences participate directly in Theater Games, thus effectively eliminating the conventional separation between improvisational actors and audiences. The theater experiment achieved limited success, and it closed after only a few months, but the school continued to use the techniques, alongside a regular elementary curriculum, well into the 1970s.

== Later years ==
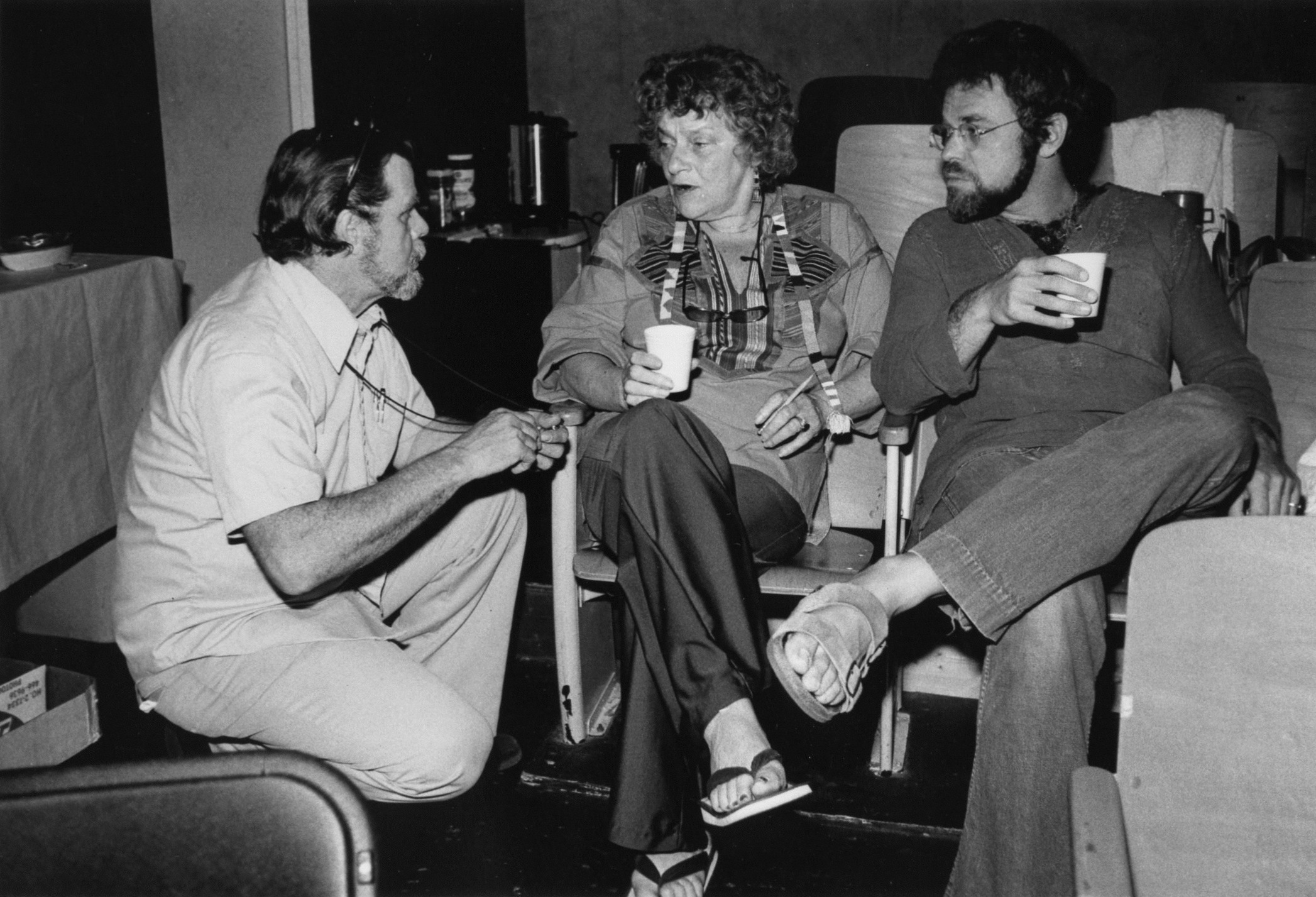
Robert Martin, Viola Spolin, and Stephen Book at the Spolin Theater Game Center in the 1970s

In 1970 and 1971 Spolin served as special consultant for productions of Sills' Story Theater in Los Angeles, New York City and on television. On the West Coast, she conducted workshops for the casts of the television shows, Rhoda and Paul Sand in Friends and Lovers, and appeared on film as an actress in Paul Mazursky's Alex in Wonderland (1970).

In November 1975, "The Theater Game File" was published. She designed it to make her unique approaches to teaching and learning more readily available to classroom teachers. In 1976, she established the Spolin Theater Game Center in Hollywood, to train professional Theater Games Coaches and served as its artistic director. In 1979 she was awarded an honorary doctorate by Eastern Michigan University, and until the 1990s she continued to teach at the Theater Game Center. In 1985, her book Theater Games for Rehearsal: A Director's Handbook was published.

== Spolin's games ==
Spolin's Theater Games transform the teaching of acting skills and techniques into exercises that are in game forms. Each Theater Game is structured to give the players a specific focus or technical problem to keep in mind during the game, like keeping your eye on the ball in a ball game. These simple, operational structures teach complicated theater conventions and techniques. By playing the game the players learn the skill, keeping their attention on the focus of the game, rather than falling into self-consciousness or trying to think up good ideas, from an intellectual source. The intention of giving the actor something on which to focus is to help them to be in the present moment, like a mantra in meditation. In this playful, active state the player gets flashes of intuitive, inspired choices that come spontaneously. The focus of the game keeps the mind busy in the moment of creating or playing, rather than being in the mind pre-planning, comparing or judging their choices in the improvisation. The exercises are, as one critic has written, "structures designed to almost fool spontaneity into being."

Spolin believed that every person can learn to act and express creatively. In the beginning of her book Improvisation for the Theater, she wrote:

Everyone can act. Everyone can improvise. Anyone who wishes to can play in the theater and learn to become 'stage-worthy.'

We learn through experience and experiencing, and no one teaches anyone anything. This is as true for the infant moving from kicking and crawling to walking as it is for the scientist with his equations.

If the environment permits it, anyone can learn whatever he chooses to learn; and if the individual permits it, the environment will teach him everything it has to teach. 'Talent' or 'lack of talent' have little to do with it.

== Spolin's work with children ==
Viola Spolin began working with children early in her career. Aside from her work with The Parent's School, Spolin used her Theatre Games as a way to help develop creative confidence in troubled kids as well as for child actors and kids who just wanted to have fun improvising. Inspired by Boyd, Spolin created these games around three core features: focus, side-coaching, and evaluation. Using these features to plan her work and activities with children created a productive safe space for children in which they were not judged based upon assumptions, but rather what they displayed in the educational environment. Spolin was associated for many years with Jane Addams Hull House as well as other locations where she and her assistant teachers taught improv workshops to children.

Spolin also directed numerous shows for children, including a production at Playwights in the mid-1950s. Soon after the Second City opened its doors in 1959, Spolin started putting up shows for children on the weekends. During Spolin children's shows the kids in the audience were invited up onto the stage to play Theatre Games with the cast. In the mid-1960s, Spolin handed the children's show (along with her improv classes) over to her protégé and assistant, Josephine Forsberg, who renamed it The Children's Theatre of the Second City and continued to produce and direct it until 1997, using Viola Spolin's audience participation improv games after every performance.

== Bibliography ==
- Improvisation for the Theater (1963, 1st ed.; 1983, 2nd ed.; 1999, 3rd ed.) (Text of Improvisation for the Theater)
- Theater Games for the Classroom: A Teacher's Handbook (1986) ( Text of Theater Games for the Classroom)
- Theater Games for the Lone Actor (2001)
- Theater Games for Rehearsal: A Director's Handbook, Viola Spolin (author), Carol Bleakley Sills (editor), Rob Reiner (foreword) (1985, 1st ed.; 2010, 2nd ed.) (Text of Theater Games for Rehearsal)
- Theater Game File (1985)
- Improvisationstechniken für Pädagogik, Therapie und Theater (2002)
