= Theatre games =

Structured play activities used to train performers

Theatre games (also spelled theater games, especially in North American sources) are structured play activities used to train performers in spontaneity, ensemble awareness, physical and verbal responsiveness, and scene-building. They are used as warm-ups before rehearsal or performance, as a method for developing improvisational theatre, as a lateral way to rehearse scripted material, and as tools in drama education, applied theatre, and drama therapy.

The modern tradition is closely associated with the American educator Viola Spolin, who adapted recreational group games she had learned from the sociologist Neva Boyd at Hull House into a system of acting exercises later called theater games. Parallel and later developments include Clive Barker's training work after Joan Littlewood's Theatre Workshop, Keith Johnstone's Impro system and Theatresports, and Augusto Boal's "gamesercises" in the Theatre of the Oppressed. Short-form performance games derived from this tradition reached a mass audience through the television series Whose Line Is It Anyway? as well as comedic troupes in live theatrical settings.

== History ==
=== Recreational and educational origins ===
Group games, folk dance, storytelling and informal dramatics were already used in early-twentieth-century settlement-house and playground work as a means of social education. At Jane Addams's Hull House in Chicago, Neva Boyd ran the Recreational Training School, teaching group games, play theory and dramatics as ways of developing language, problem-solving and social cooperation among children, including immigrant and inner-city groups. Boyd later taught at Northwestern University and published collections of recreational games. Among Boyd's students was Viola Spolin.

This recreational tradition sat alongside other early-twentieth-century uses of improvisation in actor training, including work associated with Konstantin Stanislavski and Jacques Copeau, and with progressive-education ideas about learning through doing. Theatre games as a named, transferable workshop method, however, took shape later in the century as practitioners turned children's and recreational play into systematic actor training.

=== Viola Spolin and Chicago improvisation ===
Spolin studied with Boyd in the 1920s and worked as a teacher and supervisor of creative dramatics. She began adapting Boyd's game structures to theatrical problems so that acting skills could be learned through play rather than through psychological analysis or imitation of results. After moving to California, she founded the Young Actors Company in Hollywood in the late 1940s, using games with children in workshops and in the rehearsal of plays.

Spolin's son Paul Sills carried the method into adult ensemble work in Chicago. Sills co-founded the Compass Players and, in 1959, became a founding director of The Second City, where Spolin taught workshops that helped establish improvisation as a professional training practice in the United States. Spolin published Improvisation for the Theater in 1963, a handbook of teaching and directing techniques that presented roughly two hundred games and exercises and became a standard text for improvisers, directors and teachers. Later volumes applied the same system to classrooms, rehearsals of scripted plays, and solo practice, including Theater Games for the Classroom (1986) and Theater Games for Rehearsal (first published 1985).

Spolin's games also fed the later Chicago institutions that professionalised improvisation teaching, including work continued by Josephine Forsberg and the growth of training centres associated with Second City and related companies.

== Examples ==
- Freeze: A game where players jump into scenes frozen in action, encouraging quick thinking and scene-building.
- Mirror Exercise: One partner mirrors the movements of another to build empathy and non-verbal communication.
- Alphabet Game: A scene where each consecutive line of dialogue must begin with the next letter of the alphabet, used to develop focus and narrative flexibility.
- New Choice: A game where a moderator calls for a "New choice!", requiring the performer to immediately replace their last line of dialogue with an alternative, used to explore multiple narrative paths.
- Questions Only: A high-energy game where performers must conduct a scene using only questions; any declarative statement results in a buzzer or elimination.
