= Improvisation =

Process of devising a solution to a requirement in an ad hoc fashion

Improvisation or improvization (often shortened to improv) is the activity of making or doing something not planned beforehand, using whatever can be found. The origin of the word itself is in the Latin "improvisus", which literally means un-foreseen. Improvisation in the performing arts is a very spontaneous performance without specific or scripted preparation. The skills of improvisation can apply to many different faculties across all artistic, scientific, physical, cognitive, academic, and non-academic disciplines; see Applied improvisation.

== Arts and entertainment ==
=== Performing arts ===
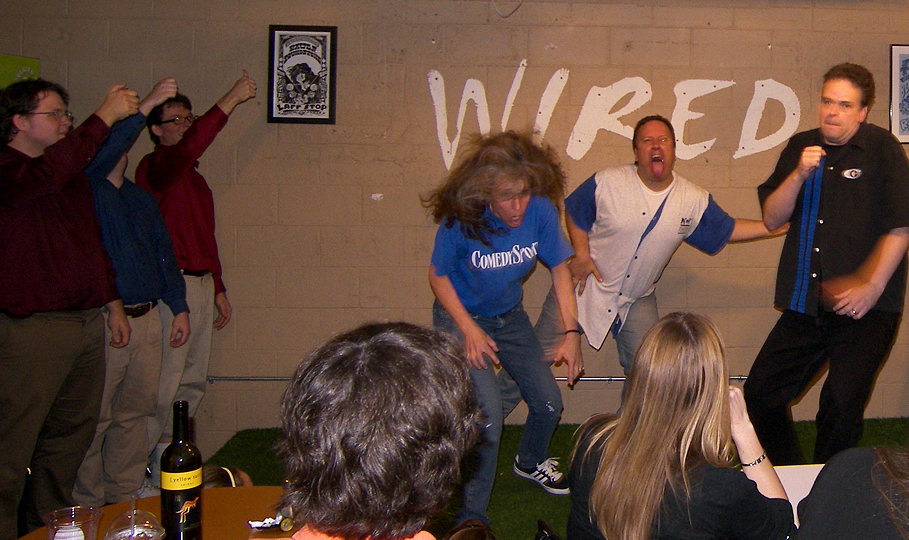
ComedySportz Austin performing a shortform game based on direction from the audience with the help of Red Dirt Improv; in this case spoofing a hard rock band performing a song made up on the stage

Improvisation can be thought of as an "on the spot" or "off the cuff" spontaneous moment of sudden inventiveness that can just come to mind, body and spirit as an inspiration. Viola Spolin created theater games as a method of training improvisational acting. Her son, Paul Sills popularized improvisational theater, or IMPROV, by using Spolin's techniques to train The Second City in Chicago, the first totally improvisational theater company in the US.

==== Music ====
Musical improvisation is usually defined as the spontaneous performance of music without previous preparation or any written notes. In other words, the art of improvisation can be understood as composing music "on the fly". There have been experiments by Charles Limb, using functional magnetic resonance imaging, that show the brain activity during musical improvisation. Limb showed increased activity in the medial prefrontal cortex, which is an area associated with an increase in self-expression. Further, there was decreased activity in the lateral prefrontal cortex, which is an area associated with self-monitoring. This change in activity is thought to reduce the inhibitions that normally prevent individuals from taking risks and improvising.

Notable improvisational musicians from the modern era include Keith Jarrett, an improvisational jazz pianist and multi-instrumentalist who has performed many improvised concerts all over the world; W. A. Mathieu a.k.a. William Allaudin Mathieu, the musical director for The Second City in Chicago, the first ongoing improvisational theatre troupe in the United States, and later musical director for another improv theatre, The Committee, an offshoot of The Second City in San Francisco; Derek Bailey, an improvisational guitarist and writer of Improvisation: Its Nature and Practice; Evan Parker; British saxophone player, the iconnical pianists Fred van Hove (Be) and Misha Mengelberg (NL) and more recently the Belgian Seppe Gebruers who improvise with two pianos tuned a quartertone apart.

Improvised freestyle rap is commonly practiced as a part of rappers' creative processes, as a "finished product" for release on recordings (when the improvisation is judged good enough), as a spiritual event, as a means of verbal combat in battle rap, and, simply, for fun. As mentioned above, studies have suggested that improvisation allows a musician to relax the control filters in their mind during this exercise. It often incorporates insults similar to those in the African-American game The Dozens, and complex rhythmic and sometimes melodic forms comparable to those heard in jazz improvisation.

==== Theatre ====
Improvisation, in theatre, is the playing of dramatic scenes without written dialogue and with minimal or no predetermined dramatic activity. The method has been used for different purposes in theatrical history.

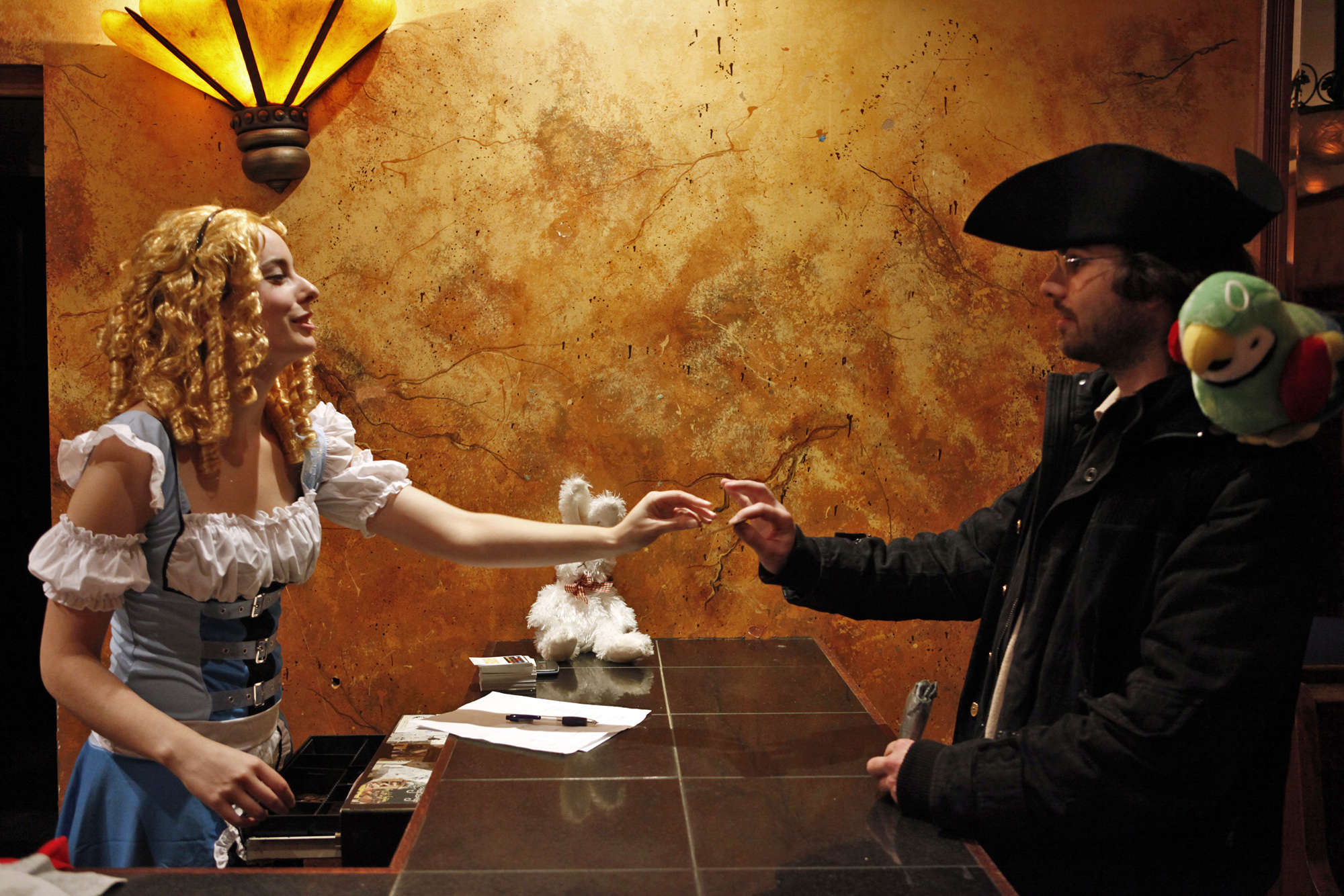
The Ligue d'improvisation montréalaise (LIM) is a league of improvisational theatre based in Montreal, Quebec, Canada

==== Dance ====
Dance improvisation as a choreographic tool: Improvisation is used as a choreographic tool in dance composition. Experimenting with the concepts of shape, space, time, and energy while moving without inhibition or cognitive thinking can create unique and innovative movement designs, spatial configuration, dynamics, and unpredictable rhythms. Improvisation without inhibition allows the choreographer to connect to their deepest creative self, which in turn clears the way for pure invention. This cognitive inhibition is similar to the inhibition described by Limb for musical improvisation, which can be found in the music section above.

Contact improvisation: a form developed in 1973, that is now practiced around the world. Contact improvisation originated from the movement studies of Steve Paxton in the 1970s and developed through the continued exploration of the Judson Dance Theater. It is a dance form based on weight sharing, partnering, playing with weight, exploring negative space and unpredictable outcomes.

=== Sculpture ===
Sculpture often relies on the enlargement of a small model or maquette to create the final work in a chosen material. Where the material is plastic such as clay, a working structure or armature often needs to be built to allow the pre-determined design to be realized. Alan Thornhill's method for working with clay abandons the maquette, seeing it as ultimately deadening to creativity. Without the restrictions of the armature, a clay matrix of elements allows that when recognizable forms start to emerge, they can be essentially disregarded by turning the work, allowing for infinite possibility and the chance for the unforeseen to emerge more powerfully at a later stage.

Moving from adding and taking away to purely reductive working, the architectural considerations of turning the work are eased considerably but continued removal of material through the rejection of forms deemed too obvious can mean one ends up with nothing. Former pupil Jon Edgar uses Thornhill's method as a creative extension to direct carving in stone and wood.

=== Film ===
The director Mike Leigh uses lengthy improvisations developed over a period of weeks to build characters and story lines for his films. He starts with some sketch ideas of how he thinks things might develop but does not reveal all his intentions with the cast who discover their fate and act out their responses as their destinies are gradually revealed, including significant aspects of their lives which will not subsequently be shown onscreen. The final filming draws on dialogue and actions that have been recorded during the improvisation period.

=== Writing ===
Improvisational writing is an exercise that imposes limitations on a writer such as a time limit, word limit, a specific topic, or rules on what can be written. This forces the writer to work within stream of consciousness and write without judgment of the work they produce. This technique is used for a variety of reasons, such as to bypass writer's block, improve creativity, strengthen one's writing instinct and enhance one's flexibility in writing.

Some improvisational writing is collaborative, focusing on an almost dadaist form of collaborative fiction. This can take a variety of forms, from as basic as passing a notebook around a circle of writers with each writing a sentence, to coded environments that focus on collaborative novel-writing, like OtherSpace.

== Science and technology ==
=== Engineering ===
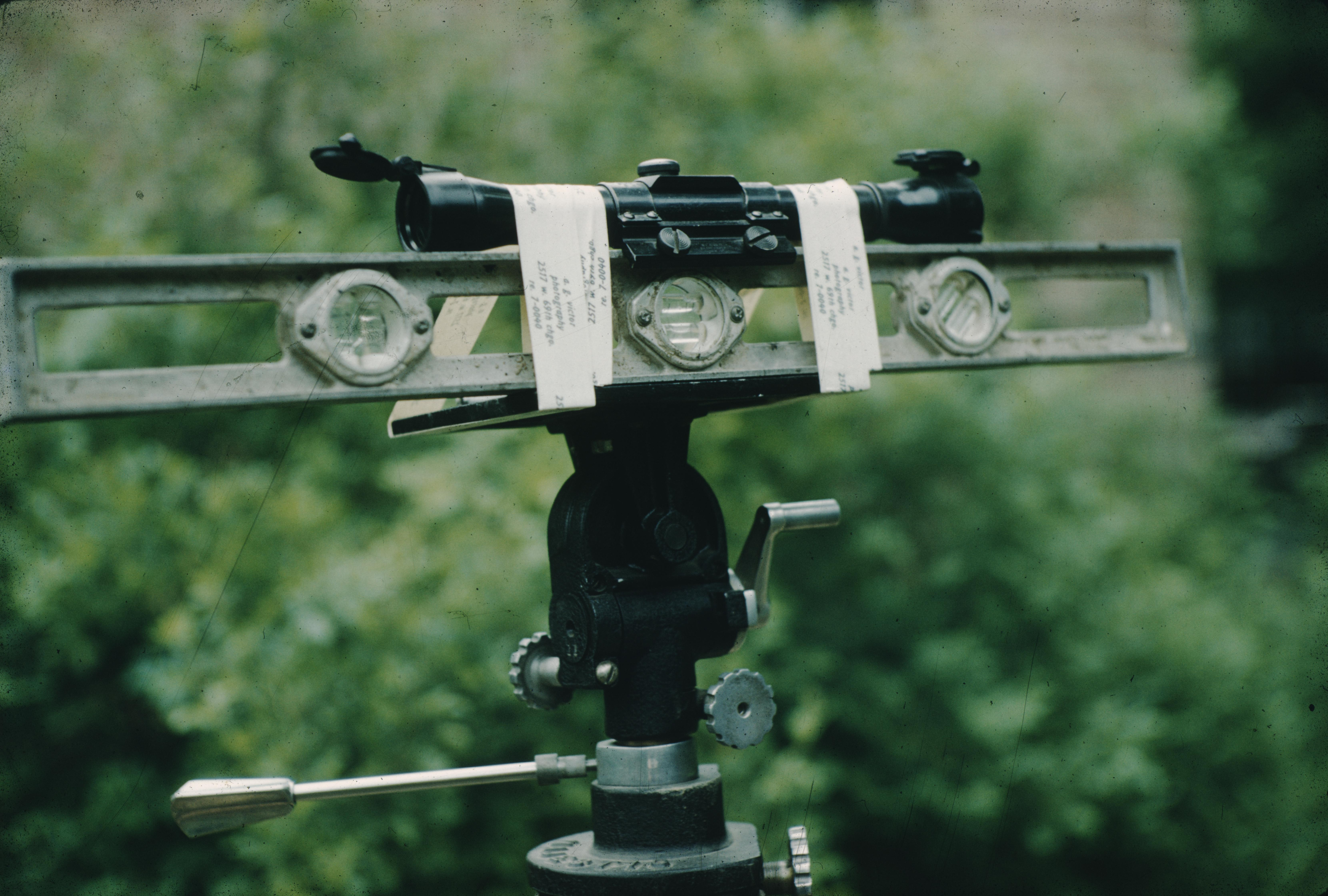
An improvised surveyors level made from a camera tripod, a torpedo level and a sniper scope.

Improvisation in engineering is to solve a problem with the tools and materials immediately at hand. Examples of such improvisation was the re-engineering of carbon dioxide scrubbers with the materials on hand during the Apollo 13 space mission, or the use of a knife in place of a screwdriver to turn a screw.

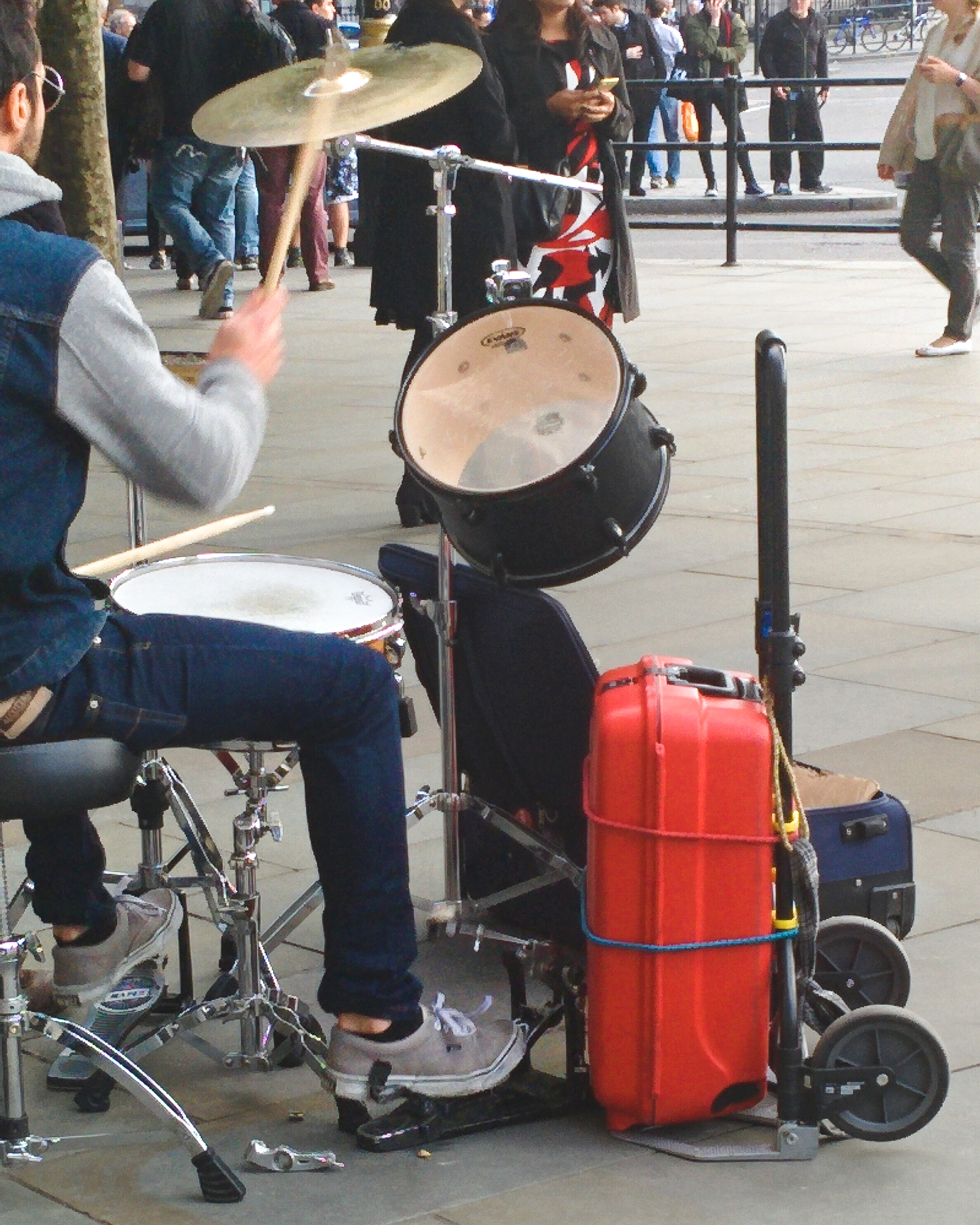
Improvised bass drum in Trafalgar Square, London.

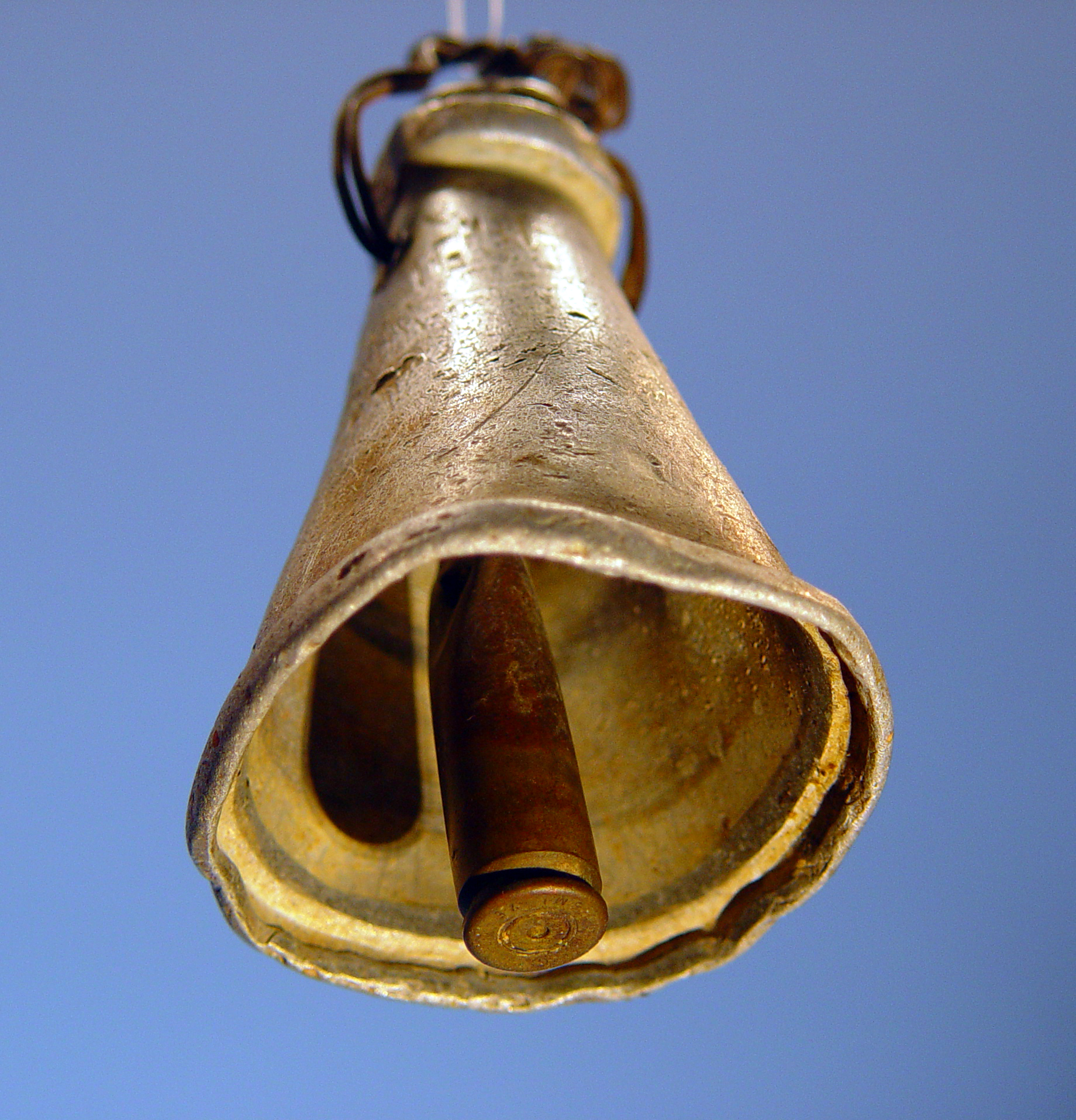
An improvised cowbell, used for sheep or goats. The bell was found in 1988 in a field near Tuqu' (Tekoa) in the West Bank. The bell's body is made of aluminum, probably a broken kitchen utensil, while the clapper is a brass cartridge case (SMI 25 NATO, probably 7.62×51mm).

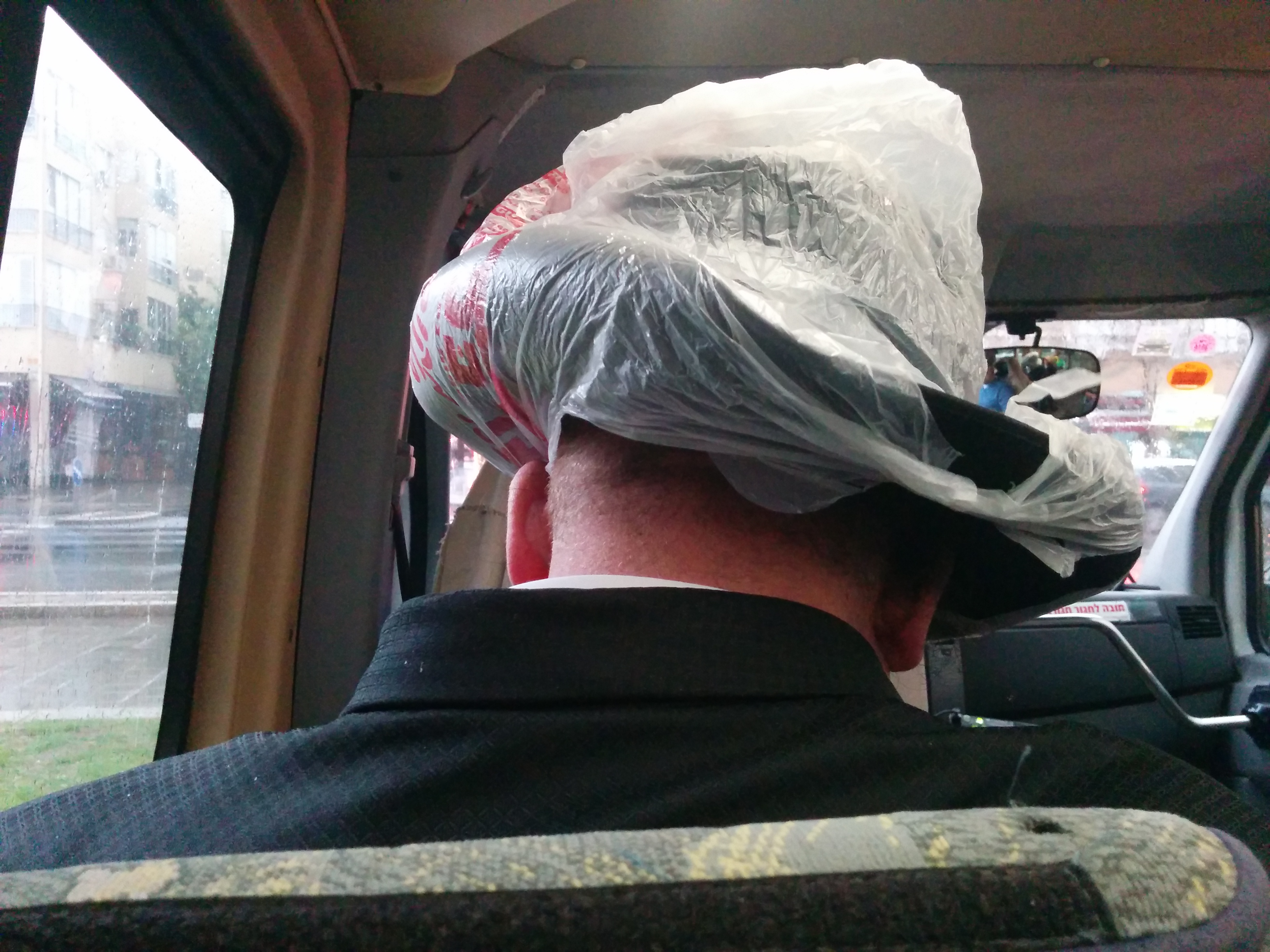
Improvised hat cover of an Orthodox Jew on a rainy day in Tel Aviv.

Engineering improvisations may be needed because of emergencies, embargo, obsolescence of a product and the loss of manufacturer support, or just a lack of funding appropriate for a better solution. Users of motor vehicles in parts of Africa develop improvised solutions where it is not feasible to obtain manufacturer-approved spare parts.

The popular television program MacGyver used as its gimmick a hero who could solve almost any problem with jury rigged devices from everyday materials, a Swiss Army knife and some duct tape.

=== Artificial intelligence ===
Machine improvisation uses computer algorithms to create improvisation on existing music materials. This is usually done by sophisticated recombination of musical phrases extracted from existing music, either live or pre-recorded. In order to achieve credible improvisation in particular style, machine improvisation uses machine learning and pattern matching algorithms to analyze existing musical examples. The resulting patterns are then used to create new variations "in the style" of the original music, developing a notion of stylistic re-injection. This is different from other improvisation methods with computers that use algorithmic composition to generate new music without performing analysis of existing music examples.

== See also ==
- Jugaad – South Asian term describing a creative hack or kludge
