= Sheldon Patinkin =

American stage director

- Born: August 27, 1935; Chicago, Illinois, U.S.
- Died: September 21, 2014 (aged 79); Chicago, Illinois, U.S.
- Occupations: Director, teacher, writer
- Known for: The Second City, Columbia College Chicago

Sheldon Arthur Patinkin (August 27, 1935 – September 21, 2014) was a chair of the Theater Department of Columbia College Chicago, artistic director of the Getz Theater of Columbia College, Artistic Consultant of The Second City and of Steppenwolf Theatre and co-director of the Steppenwolf Theatre Summer Ensemble Workshops.

He received a Jeff Award for directing his Irving Berlin revue Puttin’ on the Ritz and a special Jeff for his contribution to Chicago theater. His translation of Brecht's The Good Person of Setzuan was directed by Frank Galati at the Goodman Theatre. He was a cousin of the actor and singer Mandy Patinkin.

== Career ==
Among his directing projects outside of the college were The Glass Menagerie (Gift Theater Company), South Pacific (Metropolis Art Center), Uncle Vanya (Steppenwolf), Long Day's Journey into Night (Irish Rep and the Galway Festival in Ireland) and Krapp's Last Tape for the Buckets of Beckett Festival, both starring John Mahoney, and concert stagings of opera scenes and excerpts for the Lyric Opera Center at the Grant Park and Ravinia Festival Concerts. He had previously directed Mahoney along with John Malkovich and Terry Kinney in Death of a Salesman in 1980 for Steppenwolf.

His revue, Puttin' on the Ritz: an Irving Berlin American Songbook, won Joseph Jefferson Awards for Best Revue and Best Director. Additionally he has received a special Joseph Jefferson Award for Service to the Chicago Theater Community in 1991, and the Illinois Association's 1992 Outstanding Contribution Award.

In July 2014, Columbia College Chicago announced the Sheldon Patinkin Endowed Award, a scholarship named in his honor that will provide a theater student with a cash stipend to aid them with their career.

== Books ==
Patinkin wrote Second City: Backstage at the World's Greatest Comedy Theater, published by Sourcebooks in 2000. His textbook on the history of the American Musical No Legs, No Jokes, No Chance was published by Northwestern University Press in 2008. {https://nupress.northwestern.edu/9780810119949/no-legs-no-jokes-no-chance/}

== Death and legacy ==
On September 21, 2014, Patinkin died in Chicago after a heart attack, aged 79. He was buried two days later at Shalom Memorial Park in Arlington Heights, IL.

At the theater building at Columbia College Chicago, the New Studio Theater, which Patinkin used for many of the productions that he directed, has been named the Sheldon Patinkin Theater in his honor.
