= The Second City =

American improvisational theatre troupe

- The Second City logo by Chicago calligrapher John Weber
- Established: 1959
- Founders: Paul Sills; Bernard Sahlins; Howard Alk
- Type: Theatre group
- Purpose: Sketch comedy; Improvisation
- Location: Chicago, Illinois, United States
- Coordinates: 41.91151°N 87.63506°W
- Website: www.secondcity.com

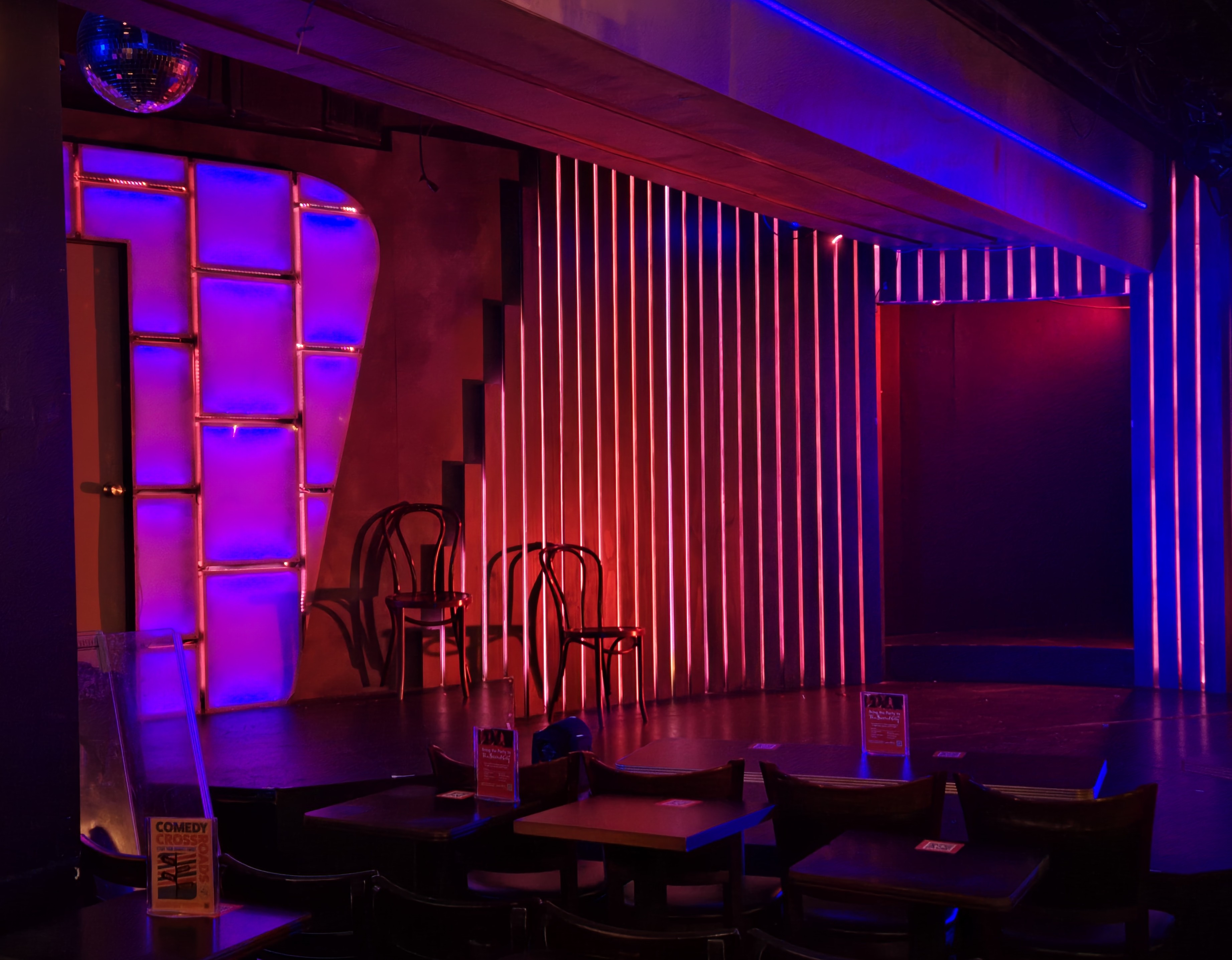
Second City e.t.c. Theatre

The Second City is an improvisational comedy enterprise. It is the oldest improvisational theater troupe to be continuously based in Chicago, with training programs and live theaters in Toronto and New York. Since its debut in 1959, it has become one of the most influential and renowned in the English-speaking world. In February 2021, ZMC, a private equity investment firm based in Manhattan, purchased the Second City.

The Second City has produced television programs in both Canada and the United States, including SCTV, Second City Presents, and Next Comedy Legend. It has been a starting point for many comedians, award-winning actors, directors, and others in show business, including Joan Rivers, Alan Alda, Harold Ramis, Bill Murray, John Candy, John Belushi, Dan Aykroyd, Eugene Levy, Catherine O'Hara, Chris Farley, Mike Myers, Steve Carell, Tina Fey, Amy Poehler, Stephen Colbert and Jason Sudeikis.

== History ==
The Second City chose its self-mocking name from the title of a series of articles about Chicago by A. J. Liebling, published in The New Yorker in 1952, also published in book form as a collection the same year. In summer 1955, at The Compass bar in Hyde Park, University of Chicago students, led by David Shepherd and Paul Sills, calling themselves Compass Players, began a "commedia dell'arte", based on professional theater games taught by Viola Spolin, who was Sills's mother. They soon began performing occasional shows on the Near North Side. On December 16, 1959, The Second City's first revue show premiered at 1842 North Wells Street, with Sills's former wife and Compass Player Barbara Harris singing "Everybody's in the Know". Admission was $1.50 (equivalent to $17 in 2025). Sahlins and Sills flipped burgers in the kitchen.

Sahlins, Sills, and Howard Alk had founded the theater, in 1959, as a place where scenes and stories were created with improvisation, using techniques that grew out of Spolin's innovative teachings, later known as Theater Games, with Sills as its director. The cabaret theater comedy style of the Second City tended towards satire and commentary on social norms, and political figures and events.

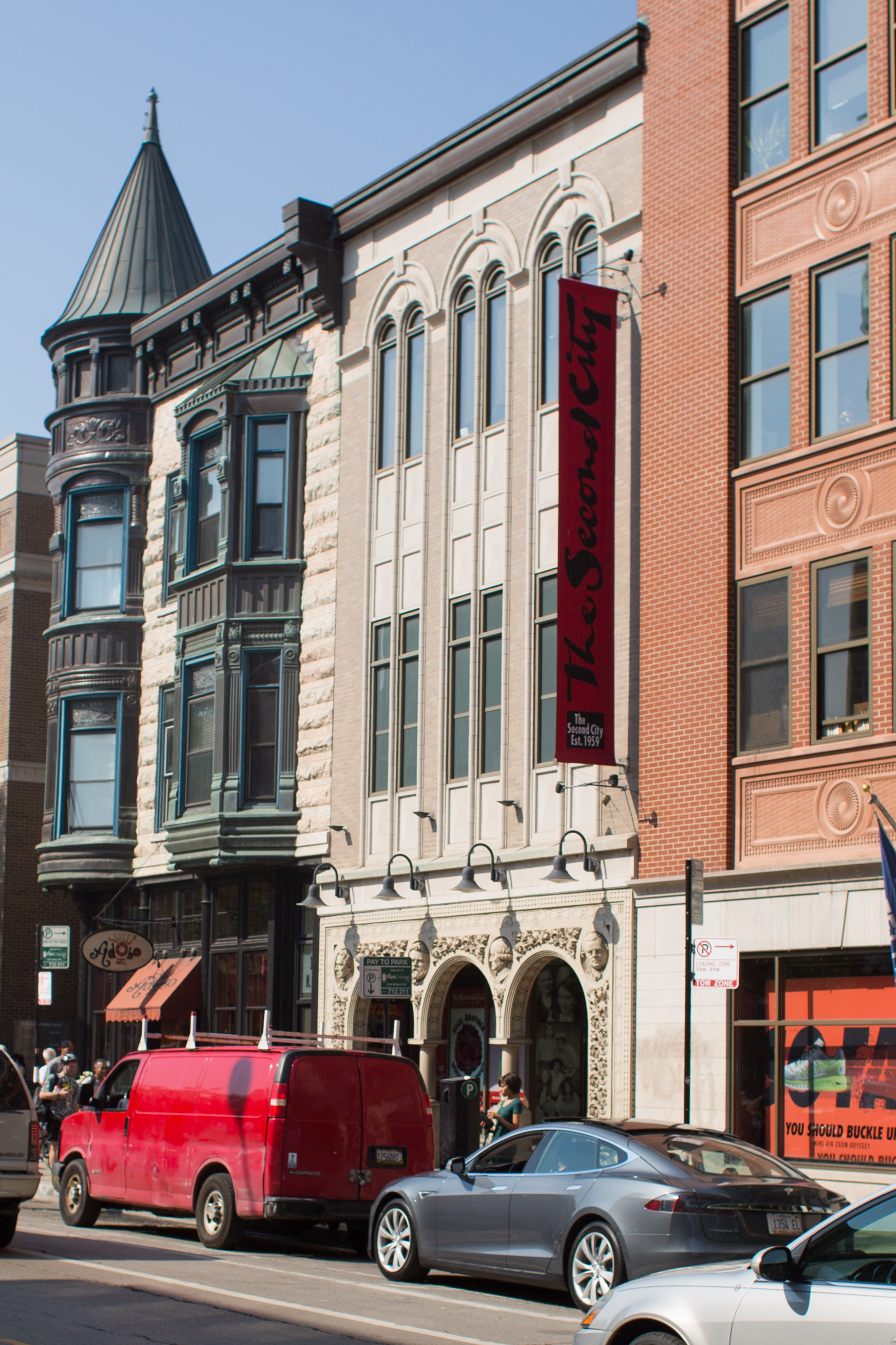
Location at 1616 North Wells Street in Chicago

In 1961, the theater sent a cast to Broadway with the musical revue, From the Second City, directed by Sills and earning Tony Award nominations for ensemble members Severn Darden and Barbara Harris. The company moved a few blocks south, to 1616 North Wells, in 1967. Eventually, the theater expanded to include three touring companies and a second resident company, and now fosters a company devoted to outreach and diversity.

In 2020, during the protests following the murder of George Floyd, The Second City faced several criticisms regarding racism. The CEO, Andrew Alexander, resigned after accusations of institutional racism from former performers and an alumnus were made. Accusations and allegations were also made on social media, triggering further leadership resignations. A notable criticism came from Second City alumnus Dewayne Perkins, who alleged that the institution initially refused to host a benefit show for Black Lives Matter unless half of the proceeds also went to the Chicago Police Department. In response to these issues, The Second City instituted changes, including the formation of a steering committee comprising representatives from BIPOC, Latinx, and LGBTQIA+ communities to foster inclusivity and diversity.

In October 2020, The Second City was put up for sale by Alexander and co-owner D'Arcy Stuart. In January 2021, The Second City and Saturday Night Live paired up to launch a new training scholarship for diverse, upcoming talent. In February 2021, ZMC, a New York City-based private equity investment firm, purchased The Second City.

In 2022, The Second City announced its expansion to New York with its new location in Williamsburg, Brooklyn. The nearly 12,000-square-foot (1,100 m^{2}) entertainment complex at 64 N. 9th Street comprises two cabaret-style live theaters, seven Training Center classrooms, and a full-service restaurant and bar. The Second City New York opened to the public on November 16, 2023, marking a significant expansion of the institution into a new geographic region.

== SCTV ==
Second City Television, or SCTV, was a Canadian television sketch comedy show offshoot from the Toronto troupe of the Second City and ran from 1976 to 1984. Broadcaster and surgeon Charles Allard formed a partnership in 1981 that acquired the fledgling series. Allard then moved the series from Toronto to Edmonton, where he owned television station CITV-TV.

The basic premise of SCTV was based on a television station (later a network) in the fictional city of Melonville. Rather than broadcast the usual TV rerun fare, the business, run by the greedy Guy Caballero (Joe Flaherty) sitting in a wheelchair only "for respect," operates a bizarre and humorously incompetent range of cheap local programming. The range included soap opera "The Days of the Week"; game shows, such as "Shoot at the Stars", in which celebrities literally are shot at in similar fashion to targets in a shooting gallery; and movie parodies, such as "Play it Again, Bob" in which Woody Allen (as played by Rick Moranis) attempts to entice Bob Hope (as played by Dave Thomas) to star in his next film. In-house media melodrama was frequently satirized, including by John Candy, as the vain, bloated variety star character, Johnny La Rue; Thomas's acerbic critic, Bill Needle; Andrea Martin's flamboyant, leopard-skin clad station manager, Mrs. Edith Prickley; Catherine O'Hara's alcoholic, narcissistic, former leading-lady, Lola Heatherton; and Flaherty's effusive talk show host, Sammy Maudlin. Martin Short also originated his dorky Ed Grimley character here, which he later brought to Saturday Night Live.

== Executive producers ==
=== Andrew Alexander ===
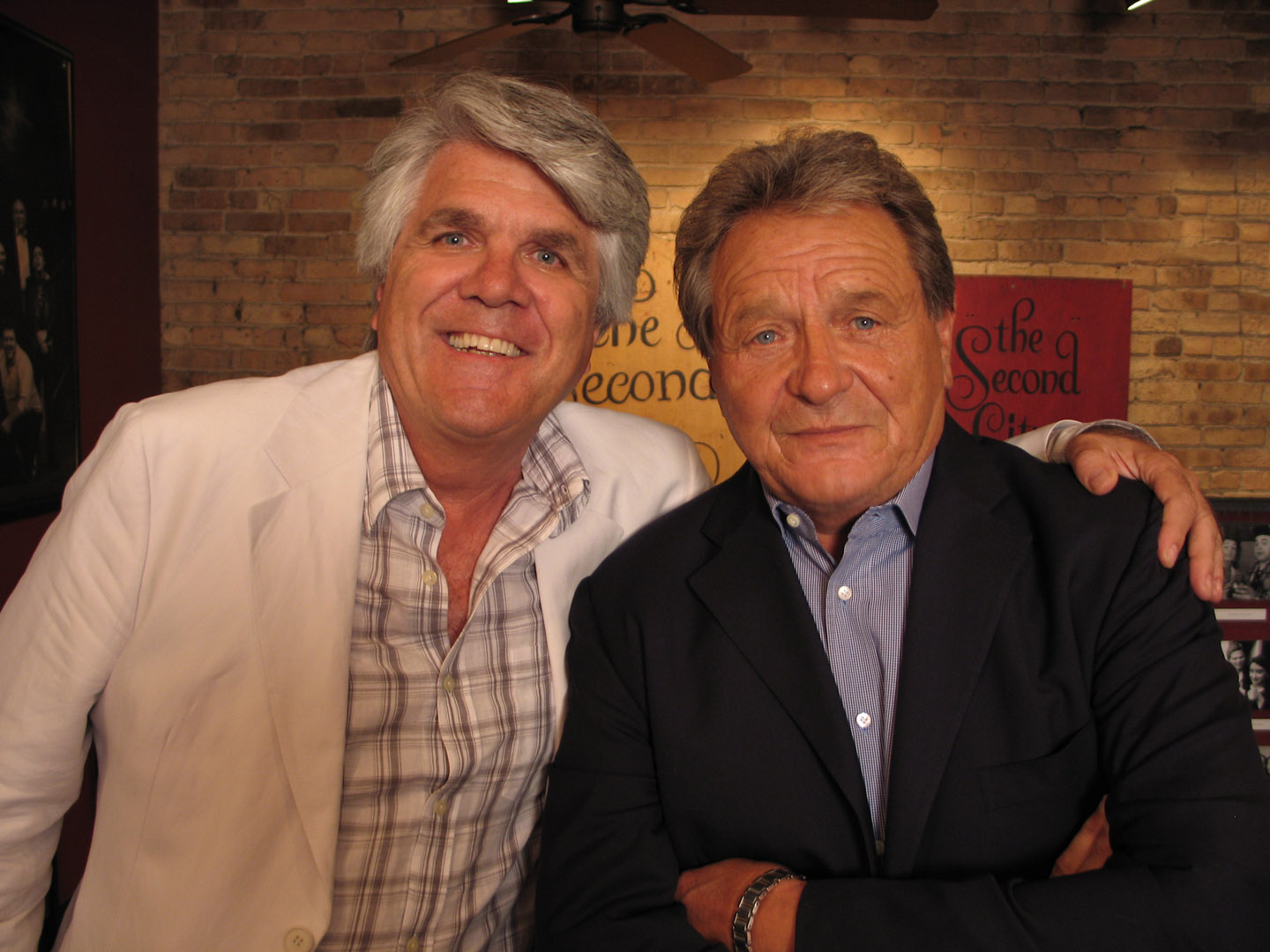
Andrew Alexander and Len Stuart

In 1974, Andrew Alexander took the reins of The Second City Toronto, which had opened in 1972, then formed a partnership with Len Stuart, in 1976, starting The Second City Entertainment Company. Its inaugural television production was SCTV that year. Alexander co-developed and executive produced over 185 half-hour shows for the series.

In 1985, Alexander and Stuart acquired Chicago's Second City. He later founded SCTV, thereby expanding The Second City TV & Film Division. He has produced or executive-produced hundreds of Second City revues in Canada and the United States.

On June 6, 2020, during the Black Lives Matter protests, various Second City comedians signed an open letter stating that "erasure, racial discrimination, manipulation, pay inequity, tokenism, monetization of Black culture, and trauma-inducing experiences of Black artists at The Second City will no longer be tolerated", prompting Alexander to apologize and resign, pledging that "The next person to fill the Executive Producer position will be a member of the BIPOC community". Interim executive producer Anthony LeBlanc was appointed to replace him.

=== Jon Carr ===
On November 25, 2020, The Second City announced that former Dad's Garage Theatre Company artistic director Jon Carr had been hired as executive producer. He stepped down in early 2022.

=== Elizabeth Howard ===
Elizabeth Howard then took the reins as Executive Producer, and later became co-president, alongside James Colquhoun. She had been with the company since 2010, developing “content” and “forging original partnerships”.

== Awards ==
As of 2014, the Second City has been awarded thirty-seven Equity Joseph Jefferson Awards, which have recognized them for Best Revue five times, the first being Paradigm Lost (1997). The revue's director, Mick Napier, is one of several directors recognized by the Jeffs, a list that includes founder Bernard Sahlins (for 1983's Exit, Pursued by a Bear) and improv guru Del Close (1981's Miro, Miro on the Wall). Sixteen alumni have received Jeff Awards for their performances in Second City revues, including David Pasquesi (The Gods Must Be Lazy, 1989), Scott Adsit (Paradigm Lost, 1997), Jackie Hoffman (Disgruntled Employee Picnic, 1993), Shelley Long (Wellsapoppin, 1977), and Nia Vardalos (Whitewater for Chocolate, 1994), with Rachel Dratch and Keegan-Michael Key each being honored twice.

In 2009, as the company was celebrating its 50th year, the Second City was awarded an honorary Jeff for the milestone, as well as three awards for the e.t.c.' s 33rd revue Studs Terkel's Not Working, recognizing director Matt Hovde and actress Amanda Blake Davis and naming it Best Revue. In 2011, the e.t.c.'s 35th revue Sky's the Limit (Weather Permitting) won the Jeff for Best New Work (Musical or Revue), as well Best Revue and Best Actor, for ensemble member Tim Baltz. The following year, the e.t.c.'s 36th revue We're All In This Room Together won for Best Revue and Best Director of a Revue - Ryan Bernier, while ensemble member Edgar Blackman took home the Jeff for Best Actor/Actress in a Revue for his work in Who Do We Think We Are? on the Second City mainstage. In 2013, the Jeff Awards awarded Best Production: Revue to a Second City show not housed at the venue on Wells Street, The Second City Guide to Opera, a collaboration with the Lyric Opera of Chicago that had been initiated by soprano and Lyric creative consultant Renée Fleming, with Best Director: Revue going to Billy Bungeroth.

Toronto's Second City mainstage troupe has won ten Canadian Comedy Awards: Best Improv Troupe (2001), Best Sketch Troupe (2001, 2006 and 2009), and Best Comedic Play winners Family Circus Maximus (2002), Psychedelicatessen (2003), Facebook of Revelations, Barack to the Future (2009), 0% Down, 100% Screwed (2010) and Something Wicked Awesome This Way Comes (2011).

== On film ==
- Goldstein (1964) – The directing debut of Philip Kaufman (The Right Stuff, The Unbearable Lightness of Being) featured several members including Severn Darden, Jack Burns, and Del Close, as well as teacher Viola Spolin. A modern-day interpretation of the story of Elijah, it won the Prix de la Nouvelle Critique at the Cannes Film Festival, and Jean Renoir called it the best American film he had seen in twenty years.
- The Monitors (1969) – A satirical alien invasion film in which earth's invaders run the planet as though they were 1950s hallway monitors, featuring members Avery Schreiber, Alan Arkin, Fred Kaz, and Peter Boyle.
- Second to None (2001) – A documentary by Matt Hoffman and Scott Silberstein about the process of writing Paradigm Lost, following the cast and director Napier from the initial rehearsal through opening night. Originally narrated by alum Jim Belushi, the film was reworked, with rehearsal footage added, ten years after its initial release.
- The Second City: First Family of Comedy (2006) – A documentary by Sharon Bartlett and alum Dave Thomas in three parts, focusing on the origins of The Second City in Chicago, the life of SCTV, and the success of notable alumni, including Tina Fey, Mike Myers, Ryan Stiles, Patrick McKenna, and Martin Short.
- I Want Someone to Eat Cheese With (2006) – An independent film starring, written, directed and produced by Jeff Garlin, himself a former Second City actor, features scenes shot within The Second City's Chicago theater, and features several of its alumni, including Mina Kolb, David Pasquesi, Amy Sedaris, Richard Kind, Dan Castellaneta, Tim Kazurinsky, and Bonnie Hunt.
- Don't Think Twice (2016) – A film written and directed by Mike Birbiglia centered around an improv troupe dealing with the effects of one member's success. It stars Second City alumni Tami Sagher, Steve Waltien and Keegan-Michael Key. The film features archival footage and photographs of Second City ensembles in the course of establishing the roots of improv comedy in Chicago.
- For Madmen Only: The Stories of Del Close (2020) – A documentary on the life and career of Second City director Del Close who mentored and trained up-and-coming comedians including John Belushi, Bill Murray, Tina Fey, Harold Ramis, Dave Thomas, George Wendt, and countless others.

== Touring Company ==
Created in 1967 as a way to increase the talent pool, the initial Touring Company, featuring Ramis, Doyle-Murray and Flaherty, was tested on the road for two years before taking the stage as The Next Generation after the mainstage ensemble was sent to perform in New York. The Touring Company continued to perform greatest hit shows on the road, and in 1982, with the assistance of producer Joyce Sloane (and without Sahlins's knowledge) they staged an original revue in what would become the theater's second stage, the Second City e.t.c.

== Fiftieth anniversary ==
In December 2009, the theater celebrated its fiftieth anniversary with a weekend of panels and performance which featured many prominent alumni, including an SCTV reunion show starring Joe Flaherty, Eugene Levy, Andrea Martin, Catherine O'Hara, Harold Ramis, Martin Short, and Dave Thomas. Other notable alumni returning to participate included Steve Carell, Stephen Colbert, Jeff Garlin, Jack McBrayer, James Belushi, Dan Castellaneta, Amy Sedaris, Ian Gomez, Richard Kind, Robert Klein, Fred Willard, David Rasche, Betty Thomas, Barbara Harris, Richard Henzel and George Wendt, as well as original cast member Mina Kolb, Compass Player Shelley Berman, and co-founder Bernard Sahlins, along with Playwrights Theater Club co-founder Sheldon Patinkin; he later served as assistant director to Paul Sills, then succeeded him as artistic director, spending over five decades as an artistic mentor of the troupe while chairman of the theater department at Columbia College Chicago for three decades.

== Training Center and The Second City Film School ==
The Second City Training Center was founded in the mid-1980s to facilitate the growing demand for workshops and instruction from the world-famous Second City theatre. Training Centers are located in Chicago, Toronto and Los Angeles. The Training Centers have grown substantially since the Second City Conservatory was established in the mid-1980s under the tutelage of longtime Chicago improv instructors and mentors Martin de Maat and Sheldon Patinkin. The Chicago Training Center has over 5,000 students in several disciplines, including improvisation and comedy writing. Former Training Center students include Steve Carell, Tina Fey, Amy Poehler, Mike Myers, Chris Farley, Tim Meadows, Bonnie Hunt, Stephen Colbert, Halle Berry, Sean Hayes, Amy Sedaris, Jon Favreau, Hinton Battle, Jack McBrayer, Dave Foley, and Kevin McDonald. Classes are taught by working professionals, many of whom are existing or former Second City performers. In 2007, the Comedy Studies program was created, as a collaboration with Chicago's Columbia College, which provides students with an immersion in "all aspects of the study of comedy and improvisation". In 2016, the Training Center expanded to include the Harold Ramis Film School, now called The Second City Film School, dedicated to comedy in filmmaking. In 2021, The Second City's educators voted to unionize as the Association of International Comedy Educators (AICE).

== The Second City Detroit ==
The Second City Detroit was a comedy theater and training center in Novi, Michigan. It was the Second City's third mainstage location in North America following the Second City Chicago and Toronto. Originally established in September 1993 in downtown Detroit, it relocated to a strip mall in Novi in 2005. The original downtown Detroit theater in the Hockeytown Cafe complex was renamed the City Theater and has since reopened as the Detroit House of Comedy; the Novi location has become the Andiamo Novi Theater.

== The Parents School ==
In the early years of the Second City and Game Theater, several parents and Lincoln Park community members—including Carol and Paul Sills and activists Mona and Dennis Cunningham—started a progressive school for their children, based on Viola Spolin's Theater Games techniques and philosophy with her son Paul Sills' refinements. Early on it was called "Playroom School," after Spolin's "Educational Playroom," a progressive school project during the 1930's on Sheridan Road which Paul Sills had attended. Theater Games were gaining recognition and are now incorporated in drama therapy, play therapy, and are used as an educational tool. Early Second City and Game Theater members, as well as some Old Town and Lincoln Park community members, were closely involved, including the Sillses and Cunninghams, Viola Spolin, Joyce and Byrne Piven, John Schultz, Mel Spiegel, Carol Dougal, and Beverly Gold. The highly progressive curriculum included daily theater games, and some students went on to careers in entertainment. Briefly at the Game Theater site at 1935 N. Sedgwick, the school moved to several locations in Lincoln Park before it closed in the mid-1970s.

== Audio recordings ==
- Comedy from The Second City (Mercury, 1961)
- From The Second City (Mercury, 1962)
- The Sound of My Own Voice and Other Noises: Severn Darden at The Second City (Mercury, 1961)
- The Second City Writhes Again! (Mercury, 1969)
- The Cosa Nostra Story (Mercury/Smash)
- The Second City Survival Kit (Spirit, 1982)
- Archival audio was released as part of Sheldon Patinkin's book, The Second City: Backstage at the World's Greatest Comedy Theater (2000)

== Other influences ==
In 1971, The Players Workshop was Chicago's only official school of Improvisation for over a decade. Although it was never officially a part of The Second City cabaret theater, The Players Workshop was often referred to as Players Workshop Of The Second City, due to the school's close affiliation with the famous sketch comedy stage.

== See also ==
- Annoyance Theater
- The Groundlings
- iO Theater
- List of museums and cultural institutions in Chicago
- Theatre in Chicago
- Under the Gun Theater
- Upright Citizens Brigade
