= Kerry Awn =

American artist

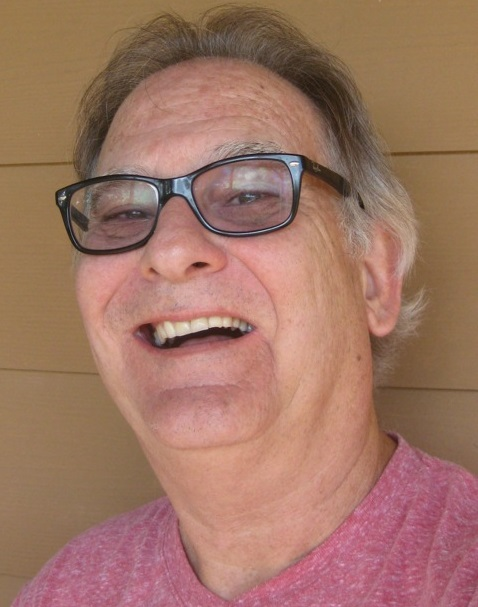
- Kerry Awn c.2014
- Born: Kerry Wallace Fitzgerald; 1949 (age 76–77); Houston, Texas

Comedy career
- Years active: 1971- Present
- Medium: Comedian, muralist, iconographer

Kerry Fitzgerald (born 1949), better known as Kerry Awn, is an American cartoonist, actor, muralist, comedian, musician, iconographer and poster artist. He is best known for his comedy and the iconic 'Austintatious' mural near the University of Texas campus, a landmark he created with two other artists. Born in Houston as Kerry Fitzgerald, Awn became prominent on the Austin countercultural scene in the 1970s as a concert poster artist and as a member of the Uranium Savages.

== Comedian: stand-up and comedy rock ==
Kerry Awn went to the Houston Comedy Workshop in 1981 and began his career as a comedian. In 1982 he joined Esther's Follies where his outlandish characters drew attention. Awn continued with Esther's Follies as a regular for thirty years until 2011. He has also been a regular at The Velveeta Room, the Austin comedy club named after one of Awn's characters, lounge lizard Ronnie Velveeta. In 1998, Awn hosted a Big Stinkin' International Improv & Sketch Comedy Festival showcase at Esther's Pool featuring 4 Out of 5 Doctors and Monteith & Rand. He is the original winner of the Funniest Person in Austin contest in 1986. Kerry Awn has performed extensively as a stand-up comic from Amarillo to Austin.

== 'Austintatious' mural ==
Created in 1974, the mural dubbed 'Austintatious' is located on the north-facing wall of the 23rd Street Renaissance Market in Austin, Texas. Considered to be an important part of Austin history, the forty year old mural was damaged by graffiti in 1994 and again in January 2014. The colorful mural shows a bustling town beneath a clear blue sky surrounding Stephen F. Austin who is holding a few armadillos. In June 2014, Kerry Awn joined the other two original artists Tom Bauman and Rick Turner, who had returned to restore the mural. They crowd-sourced to raise $30,000 for supplies and to afford five weeks away from work. The three artists also collaborated in 2003 to create the Tejas mural that covers the opposite end of the market.

The three Austintatious Artists returned for a major restoration in October 2021 in advance of the mural's 50th anniversary. The time capsule contained some finishing touches including some friends of the artists: Henry Gonzalez, Michel Priest, Earl Campbell and Ann Richards. This time the restoration was completed with funding from Austin's Dougherty Arts Center and the Phogg Foundation. The latter planned a 50th anniversary celebration April Fools' Day, 2023.

The three artists, Awn, Bauman, and Turner, came back to Austin again in April 2024 — Awn from Alpine, Turner from New York City, and Bauman from Driftwood. They repainted the central portion of the fisheye-lens mural after a tagger wrote five foot tall letters across it.

The trio has made trips home in 1982, 2002, 2014, 2022 and 2024. Each time the artists have added new buildings and historical structures to the piece, Turner said. "(Additions are) normally dictated by whatever is happening in popular culture at the moment,... It keeps the mural alive. It is a living, evolving, growing thing." Awn expected the original mural might to last five years, adding, “We didn’t know it was gonna still be up 50 years later.”

Other murals by Kerry Awn can be found on Planet K stores in the Austin area. One became the subject of a criminal charge, when the City of Bee Cave objected to it under its sign ordinance. In June 2012, after more than a year of battling over murals and building permits, Bee Cave City Council approved a settlement with the owner of Planet K.

== Cartoon and poster art ==
Kerry Awn's work appeared prominently in Austin's The Rag and Houston's Space City, early underground papers. Often Awn's art was featured on the cover of Space City. During the heyday of the Armadillo World Headquarters, he created concert posters and handbills, many of which are archived in a collection at the Austin History Center. He was part of the group of artists known as the Armadillo Art Squad. The collection includes posters that promoted shows at Austin venues such as The Roadhouse, Jovitas, The Ritz, Willies Steamboat, Armadillo World Headquarters, the Continental Club, Soap Creek Saloon, La Zona Rosa, Liberty Lunch, and the Velveeta Room.

== Painting ==
Awn's painting of a young Willie Nelson was at the entrance to the Outlaws & Armadillos exhibit at the Country Music Hall of Fame and Museum in Nashville. The exhibit opened May 2018 and ran through early 2021.

== Awards ==
Awn was inducted into the Austin Arts Hall of Fame and has been recognized by the City of Austin and the State of Texas for his contributions to the arts. He was voted Austin's funniest person ten years running by the Austin Chronicle.
