= Jeremy Sweetlamb =

American improviser, director, and comedy-festival producer

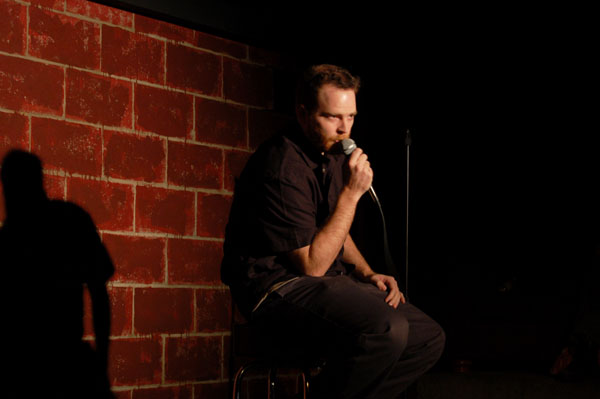
- Sweetlamb in 2007
- Other name: Jeremy Lamb
- Occupations: Improviser, director, festival producer
- Known for: Founding the Out of Bounds Comedy Festival

Jeremy Sweetlamb, known earlier as Jeremy Lamb, is an American improvisational theatre performer, director, teacher, and comedy-festival producer whose career has centered on the improv scene in Austin, Texas. He took the surname Sweetlamb after he and his wife, Caitlin Sweet, combined their surnames when they married. He is the founder of the Out of Bounds Comedy Festival. He is recognized for continuing and expanding Austin's hybrid style of improv innovation with Well Hung Jury and the Available Cupholders.

== Education and training ==
Sweetlamb earned a film degree from the University of Texas at Austin. His improv education was not an adherence to any one school of thought. He trained in Chicago with performers associated with Second City and ImprovOlympic, and the Upright Citizens Brigade Theatre in Los Angeles.

== Performing career ==
=== Early work and Well Hung Jury ===
Sweetlamb became interested in improvisation as a teenager after watching reruns of the British version of Whose Line Is It Anyway?. While in high school, he attended performances by Monks' Night Out at the Velveeta Room and successfully auditioned for Los Paranoias, a Monks' Night Out sister troupe directed by Pamela Ribon that also included member Shana Merlin. After and several friends were not selected for Monks' Night Out at a later audition, they formed Well Hung Jury. He started the troupe with fellow students while a senior at Westwood High School.

Well Hung Jury used experimental formats and atypical performance spaces. Its members helped rebuild the Hideout Theatre in exchange for performance time, giving the troupe a regular venue. They staged shows in unconventional locations through their Improv in Weird Places series, including performances on a parking-garage roof, a city bus, a river, and at the State Capitol. They also staged a 27-hour continuous improvised narrative described as an unofficial world-record performance.

Well Hung Jury performed outside of Austin, including the Chicago Improv Festival. The troupe disbanded after more than five years as several members left Austin, including Sweetlamb, who moved to Chicago.

Sweetlamb's performance at FronteraFest, Jeremy's One-Man Butt, was selected for the 2001 festival's Best of Fest.

=== Available Cupholders and later performance work ===
Well Hung Jury evolved into Available Cupholders, which Sweetlamb formed with longtime friends and collaborators. Like Well Hung Jury, the troupe performed in unconventional settings and toured colleges, fringe festivals, and theaters in other cities. A performance staged inside a standard-size van drew four audience members. The troupe also performed at more traditional venues such as Wright State University and the Columbus Fringe Festival.

Available Cupholders continued performing after members moved to different parts of the country. The group reunited for its tenth Sarasota Improv Festival after performing together for 20 years. The troupe returned to Florida Studio Theatre in 2022 for a residency combining performances and workshops.

After three years in Chicago, he returned to Austin and resumed performing with Available Cupholders while also touring as a solo act under the name Bearded Lamb. He and Mike D'Alonzo provided comedy play-by-play and color commentary during a staged Rose Bowl broadcast at the Hideout Theatre, with other improvisers contributing sideline reports and comic takes on commercials. His other Austin performance work included helping originate the Hideout Improv Marathon and reviving the improvised-wrestling production Soul Grudge Showdown with Michael Joplin. During the COVID-19 shutdown in 2020, Sweetlamb and D'Alonzo created Hardass Trivia, an online trivia-comedy show presented through Fallout Theatre's Twitch channel.

== Out of Bounds Comedy Festival ==
Sweetlamb founded the Out of Bounds Improv Festival and Miniature Golf Tournament in 2002. He had been a volunteer at the Big Stinkin' International Improv & Sketch Comedy Festival while in high school and later said its end left room for another Austin comedy festival organized on a smaller and more sustainable scale. He wanted to bring visiting performers, styles, and ideas to Austin while retaining the parts of festival culture he valued and avoiding those he did not. The festival's name reflected Sweetlamb's interest in exploring different forms of improvisation, and continued after Sweetlamb moved to Chicago.

After moving back to Austin, Sweetlamb returned to the festival's leadership. He and Shannon McCormick produced an event that emphasized relatively little hierarchy among troupes, affordable access to workshops and featured performers, and payments to participating artists.

By 2012, Out of Bounds was presenting more than 500 performers in 100 shows across six venues. Sweetlamb described community, improv, and sketch comedy as its central concerns and argued for gradual growth that avoided debt.

== Directing and teaching ==
After appearing with Available Cupholders at the Sarasota Improv Festival, Sweetlamb remained in Florida to teach master classes emphasizing narrative structure, avoiding self-editing, and accepting failure as part of the improvisational process. He also joined Florida Studio Theatre as a guest teaching artist and directed Just Desserts, a production combining short- and long-form improvisation. He was a resident artist and director of improvisation at the theater.

At the Hideout Theatre, Sweetlamb directed Process, an improvised production structured around the auditions, rehearsal, and performance of a fictional play.
