= Out of Bounds Comedy Festival =

Comedy festival in Austin, Texas

- Genre: Comedy festival
- Frequency: Annual
- Locations: Austin, Texas
- Country: United States
- Years active: 2002–present
- Founder: Jeremy Sweetlamb
- Website: oobfest.com

Out of Bounds Comedy Festival, often abbreviated OOB, is a recurring comedy festival in Austin, Texas. Founded by Jeremy Sweetlamb, the festival presents improv, sketch comedy, stand-up comedy, films, and other forms of comedy.

== History ==
=== Founding and early development ===
Out of Bounds emerged from the void left when the Big Stinkin' International Improv & Sketch Comedy Festival ended and Monks' Night Out disbanded. The Hideout and the Bad Dog Comedy theatre remained to develop local ensemble talent.

Sweetlamb had been a volunteer at Big Stinkin'. As member of Well Hung Jury, he later founded Out of Bounds after the troupe traveled to other comedy festivals. He wanted to retain the elements he enjoyed while avoiding aspects he found less appealing.

The first Out of Bounds was held over two nights at The Hideout Theatre, with Austin performers joined by visiting acts from Dallas, College Station, and Kentucky. The festival operated on a budget of $400 and broke even.

OOB began as an alternative to the larger-scale approach associated with the Big Stinkin' festival. Sweetlamb placed emphasis on camaraderie among performers and experimentation like Monks' Night Out rather, than industry attention or professional discovery. Mike D'Alonzo and Shannon McCormick were among the festival's early producers.

Growth during the festival's early years came largely through the improv community, by visiting performers spreading interest in the festival through word of mouth. By 2007, OOB was hosting 43 improv troupes, including about a dozen from outside Texas. It expanded to seven nights at four venues, with more than 75 troupes from across the United States and a group from Australia.

=== Expansion ===
As OOB grew, its programming expanded beyond improv. It presented a wider range of live performances, in order to showcase varied and original forms of comedy. Performers came from increasingly distant locations, including Europe and the Middle East, while sketch and stand-up became larger parts of the festival.

OOB grew from a single-stage event to seven nights on six stages, with more than 120 improv and sketch troupes, stand-up comics, and films. Venues included The Hideout Theatre, ColdTowne Theater, The Velveeta Room, and the State Theatre.

As the festival grew in the following years, it needed to accommodate larger audiences. When OOB expanded from six venues to eight, the change was to increase available seating. Some highly rated acts received repeat performances.

By the middle of the decade, OOB had settled into a scale of more than 500 performers and roughly 130 shows spread among multiple Austin venues. OOB is Austin's longest-running comedy festival and the largest multi-disciplinary comedy festival in the South, that brings together hundreds of improv, sketch, and stand-up performers Austin.

The festival went on hiatus following the outbreak of the COVID-19 pandemic. It returned in 2025, and continued annually.

== Format ==
OOB has presented improv, sketch comedy, stand-up, filmed comedy, and hybrid forms of performance. In addition to shows, there were workshops from visiting performers, as well as longer master classes that allowed participants more time to work with the instructors.

Miniature golf was a social component of the festival in its early years. The tournament gave visiting and local performers an informal activity in which they could socialize with other performers. The winning team was awarded the Ridiculous Jacket, which its members wore until the end of the festival, then returned it to be awarded to the following year's winner.

== See also ==
- List of improvisational theater festivals
- Improvisational theatre
- Sketch comedy
- Stand-up comedy
- The Hideout Theatre
- The Velveeta Room
