= Carlo Mazzone-Clementi =

- Mazzone-Clementi with a commedia dell'arte mask
- Born: 12 December 1920
- Died: 5 November 2000 (aged 79); San Francisco, California, United States
- Occupations: Theatre founder, actor and tutor

Carlo Alessandro Luigi Mazzone-Clementi (12 December 1920 – 5 November 2000) was an Italian-born performer and founder of two schools of commedia dell'arte, mime and physical theatre. He worked with Marcel Marceau, Jacques Lecoq, Dario Fo and Franca Rame in postwar European theatre, and from 1958 taught commedia and mask work in the United States. With his wife Jane Hill he founded Dell'Arte in California, and later founded the Commedia School in Copenhagen with Ole Brekke.

== Biography ==
Mazzone-Clementi first gained attention in Italy in 1947 alongside Marcel Marceau on the mime's first tour outside Paris. From 1948 to 1951 he assisted Jacques Lecoq, while Lecoq taught and directed the Players of Padua University. In 1953 he joined the Teatro Nazionale d'Arte Italiano, and the following year was at the Piccolo Teatro di Milano with Dario Fo and Franca Rame.

While he was performing with Piccolo Teatro and teaching in Rome, the American theatre scholar and director Eric Bentley came to Italy to direct the Padua Players in the first Italian production of a work by Bertolt Brecht. With Bentley's patronage, Mazzone-Clementi toured the United States in 1958, giving workshops in mime and commedia and introducing the leather masks of Amleto Sartori to American performers. That led to teaching assignments at the Carnegie Institute of Technology, Brandeis University, the University of California, Berkeley, the American Conservatory Theater and other institutions.

In New York in 1958 he appeared as the rooster in Sean O'Casey's Cock-A-Doodle Dandy at the Carnegie Hall Playhouse. The New Yorker noticed his performance. While warming up for the show he fell through ironwork at Carnegie Hall and injured cartilage in both knees. He finished the production, but when doctors told him that surgery could leave his knees either better or worse, he decided to concentrate more on teaching commedia.

In 1965 Mazzone-Clementi taught mime classes in the workshop program of the Repertory Theatre of Lincoln Center. He was known as Carlo Mazzone until 1965, when he began using the name Carlo Mazzone-Clementi. Clementi was the name of his mother and his grandfather, Girolamo Clementi, who was versed in the work of the Paduan playwright Angelo Beolco, known as Ruzzante.

Mazzone-Clementi and his wife Jane Hill founded Dell'Arte in Berkeley in 1971 as a school for mime and European physical theatre. In the early 1970s they moved to Northern California, where Hill joined the faculty at College of the Redwoods. The pair created the Grand Comedy Festival at Qual-a-wa-loo, a summer festival that presented Shakespeare alongside musicals adapted from his plays, with Mazzone-Clementi as artistic director for six years. Its first season in 1973, called "Shakespeare on Broadway", included Kiss Me, Kate and The Boys from Syracuse, based on The Taming of the Shrew and The Comedy of Errors.

In 1974 the couple bought the Odd Fellows Hall in Blue Lake, California, and opened the Dell'Arte School of Mime and Comedy there the following year. The school later became the Dell'Arte International School of Physical Theatre. In 1976 Mazzone-Clementi, Joan Schirle and Jon'Paul Cook founded the Dell'Arte Company, which made its first tour in 1977. His article "Commedia and the Actor" was published in The Drama Review in March 1974.

A second school followed in 1978, when Mazzone-Clementi and Ole Brekke founded the Commedia School in Copenhagen. It offered a two-year program in physical theatre based on Mazzone-Clementi's teaching, and he remained on the staff for fifteen years. Around 1980, a dispute over the direction of Dell'Arte led to a restructuring that separated the school and performing company. Mazzone-Clementi was among those who left. After ten years as Dell'Arte's master teacher he moved to Copenhagen, and later lived and taught in Denmark and Italy.

He returned to Blue Lake in 1994, more than a decade after his departure, and again gave lectures and workshops at Dell'Arte. In 1999 he taught at the fourth Big Stinkin' International Improv & Sketch Comedy Festival in Austin, where he also joined Charna Halpern, Gary Austin, Fred Kaz and Dan O'Connor on the Masters Panel. Mazzone-Clementi died on 5 November 2000 in San Francisco, following complications from heart surgery.

== Performing history ==
Besides his work with the Padua Players, Marceau and Piccolo Teatro, Mazzone-Clementi appeared in Italian films. His credits included the 1950 comedy Side Street Story, Federico Fellini's The White Sheik (1952), the 1952 anthology film In Olden Days, and Ulysses (1954).

In 1957 he created a solo show, Six Characters in Search of Commedia, playing a succession of masked characters. He later toured the show in the United States. In New York he was represented by the agent Toby Cole. At the 1980 Venice Biennale's Carnevale del Teatro, he directed and performed in Birds of a Feather with the Dell'Arte Company. In 1984 he performed at a Mime & Clown Festival.
