= Fred Kaz =

American jazz pianist and composer (1933–2014)

Background information
- Born: Frederick R. Kaz; December 28, 1933; Chicago, Illinois, U.S.
- Died: March 12, 2014 (aged 80) San Pedro, California, U.S.
- Genre: Jazz
- Occupations: Pianist, composer, musical director
- Instrument: Piano
- Label: Atlantic

Frederick R. Kaz (December 28, 1933 – March 12, 2014) was an American jazz pianist, composer and musical director. He recorded Eastern Exposure for Atlantic Records in 1960 and spent nearly 25 years at The Second City in Chicago. His film scores included The Monitors (1969) and Little Murders (1971).

== Jazz career ==
Kaz was born in Chicago. In his late teens he studied piano and composition at DePaul University while working at a paper-box factory. A machine caught his left hand there, taking one finger and part of another and badly injuring the rest. The accident ended his plan to become a classical concert pianist. He initially thought he was finished as a professional musician.

Jazz gave Kaz a way to keep playing. Instead of reproducing every chord as written, he could distribute the notes according to what his hand could manage. He created the effect of a sustained swell by repeating notes. Other techniques included clusters followed by selected held notes, slides and accented grace notes. The damage became part of how he played, and arranger Bill Mathieu drew on Kaz's music in his own work.

In 1960, Kaz recorded Eastern Exposure with bassist Victor Sproles and drummer Roger Wanderscheid. Atlantic Records issued the album as LP 1335. Its Near Eastern ideas were reflected in titles such as "Muezzin", "Fez" and "Turkish Blues"; the record also included "One White Whale".

== The Second City ==
Paul Sills first offered Kaz a piano job at The Second City in 1959. Kaz said he could not take it until 1965. A Chicago Sun-Times account dates his appointment as musical director to 1964. He remained until his retirement in 1989.

Kaz's piano stood beside the stage. Written sketches had rehearsed accompaniment, while improvised scenes required him to follow the actors as they went along. He could change the pace or mood, push a scene in another direction, or leave it without music. The audience's reaction also affected the performance. Kaz called improv a "skeletal structure" that the actors and audience filled out together.

A musical cue from Kaz could change what an improviser did next. Bill Murray was among the performers with whom he had that kind of exchange. Ann Ryerson remembered his piano as a way of communicating with the cast and keeping them "afloat". Actors valued Kaz's judgment alongside that of directors Bernard Sahlins and Del Close.

The pianist at the side of the stage became a familiar part of Second City's performances. He served longer than any performer in the company's history.

Kaz composed the music for The Second City's film The Monitors as well as appearing in it. He scored Alan Arkin's Little Murders (1971). In the 1986 Cinemax special Jim Belushi – Birthday Boy, Kaz played a jazz pianist. His scene with Belushi's traveling salesman takes place in an almost empty hotel dining room, where the two match popular songs to works of literature.

== Later years ==
Retirement from The Second City took Kaz to Southern California, but not away from improv. He became musical director of the Upfront Comedy Showcase in Santa Monica in 1990, saying that the work had renewed his enthusiasm. He also played Noah in the 1994 mock documentary ...And God Spoke.

In 1999 at the Big Stinkin' International Improv & Sketch Comedy Festival, Kaz was part of a Masters Panel along with Charna Halpern, Gary Austin, Carlo Mazzone-Clementi and Dan O'Connor. The Los Angeles Improv Comedy Festival selected him for its Del Close Advancement of Improv Award in 2005.

Kaz lived aboard a boat in San Pedro, where he died of lung cancer on March 12, 2014. He was 80. The Second City subsequently held a memorial celebration for him in Chicago.

== Discography ==
- Eastern Exposure (Atlantic, 1960)

== Film scores ==
- The Monitors (1969)
- Little Murders (1971)
