= John Henry Faulk Living Theatre =

Former theatre in Austin, Texas

- Interactive map of John Henry Faulk Living Theatre
- Address: 204 East Fourth Street
- Location: Austin, Texas, United States
- Coordinates: 30.266°N 97.7418°W
- Type: Theatre

The John Henry Faulk Living Theatre was a small theatre at 204 East Fourth Street in downtown Austin, Texas. It opened in 1996 and was named for Austin-born folklorist, broadcaster, and free-speech advocate John Henry Faulk. The space was used for plays, comedy, workshops, classes, and community meetings.

== History ==
By December 1996, the John Henry Faulk was operating as a new downtown theatre at Fourth and Brazos. It was created in tribute to Faulk's achievements and ideals and was used for performances, workshops, theatre classes, and community meetings.

The building at 204 East Fourth Street also housed the administrative offices of the American Institute for Learning, which offered educational and skills programs for teenagers and adults. By July 2000, the organization was known as American Youth Works. The theatre was still presenting events at 204 East Fourth Street that October. Brazos Hall opened at the former theatre address in 2013.

== Programming ==
Programming in 1998 included the Pro Arts Collective's adaptation of James Weldon Johnson's God's Trombones, Tongue and Groove Theatre Company's Our Own Dear Anton's Abandoned Story Cycle, bent spectacles' production of Jean-Claude van Itallie's America Hurrah, and Austin playwright Clay Nichols's O.T. MoMFest also used the theatre for two nights that November.

In 1999, the theatre was one of the venues for the fourth Big Stinkin' International Improv & Sketch Comedy Festival. Its improv and sketch comedy programming there included the Improv Bandits, Well Hung Jury, and One Hit Wonder, along with a youth workshop showcase. Later that year, Ruth Margraff's alternative opera The Cry Pitch Carrolls premiered at the theatre, with music by the Golden Arm Trio.

In 2000, the theatre presented the Disciples of Melpomene's Titus Andronicus, Fabulous and Ridiculous Theatre's adaptation of A Clockwork Orange, and Macbeth.
