= Paramount Theatre (Austin, Texas) =

Theater and movie theater in Austin, Texas

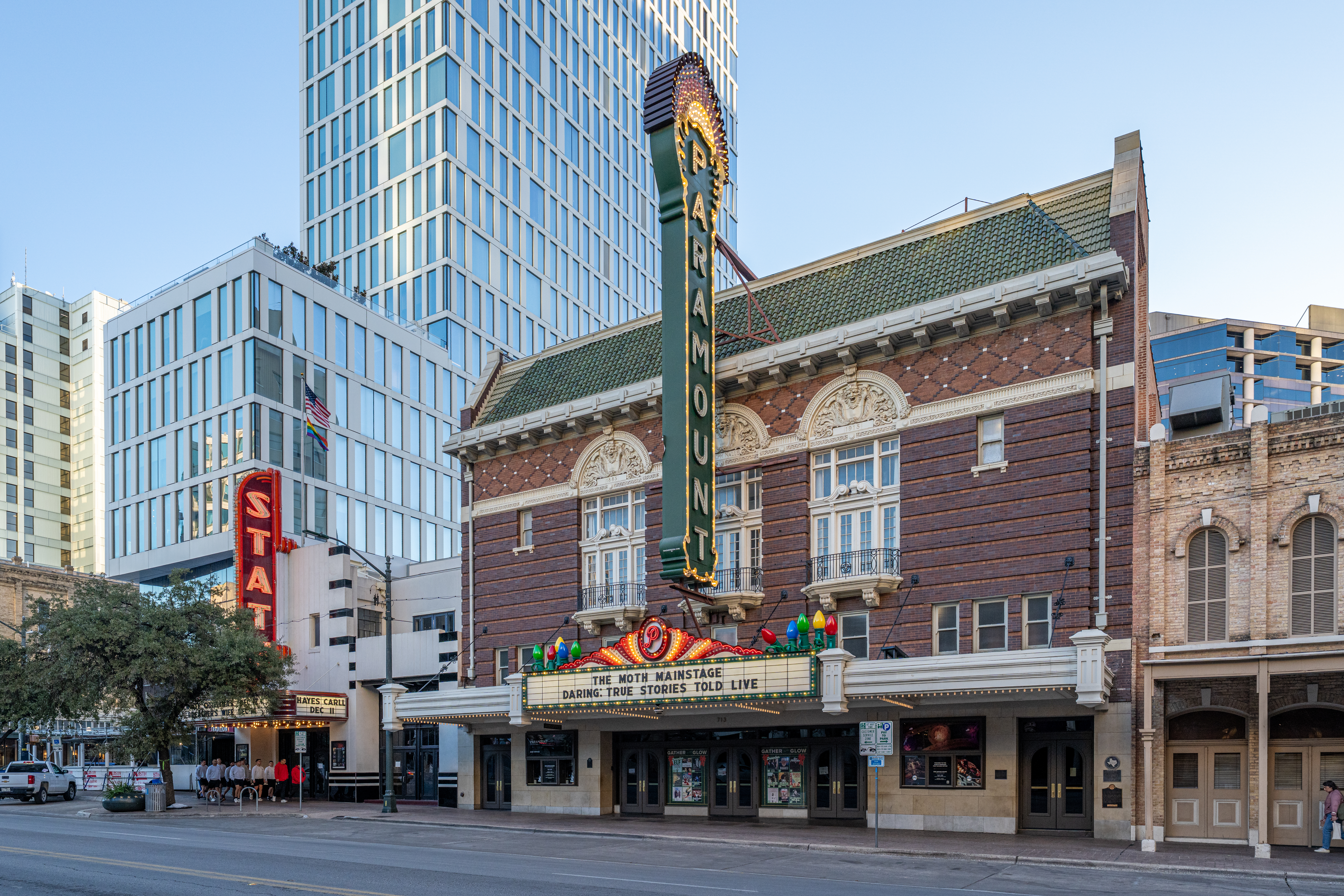
- Entrance to venue (2025)
- Interactive map of Paramount Theatre
- Former names: Gaiety Theatre (planning/construction); Majestic Theatre (1915–30); Paramount Theatre (1930–76; 2000-present); Paramount Theatre for the Performing Arts (1976–2000)
- Address: 713 Congress Avenue; Austin, Texas 78701-3216
- Location: Downtown Austin
- Coordinates: 30.2694668°N 97.7442607°W
- Owner: Paramount, Inc.
- Operator: Austin Theatre Alliance
- Capacity: 1,270

Construction
- Groundbreaking: February 1915
- Opened: October 11, 1915
- Renovated: 1930, 1957–58, 1978–80, 2000, 2015
- Cost: $150,000 ($4.77 million in 2025 dollars)
- Architect: John Eberson

Website
- Venue Website
- Paramount Theatre
- U.S. National Register of Historic Places
- U.S. National Historic Landmark
- Recorded Texas Historic Landmark
- Built: 1915
- NRHP reference No.: 76002072
- RTHL No.: 14684

Significant dates
- Added to NRHP: June 23, 1976
- Designated RTHL: 1976

The Paramount Theatre is a live theatre venue/movie theatre located in downtown Austin, Texas. The classical revival style structure was built in 1915. The building was listed in the National Register of Historic Places on June 23, 1976.

In more than a century of operation, the Paramount has hosted vaudeville, silent and sound films, live theater, musical performances, comedians, and public events. Its film history includes premieres such as the 1966 world premiere of Batman: The Movie.

== History ==
=== Early history and preservation ===
The four-story theater was conceived as the Gaiety Theatre and built by Austin businessman Ernest Nalle, who commissioned architect John Eberson to design the building in January 1915. Construction was announced in February 1915 and completed later that year. The theater opened as the Majestic Theatre on October 11, 1915, as part of the Interstate Vaudeville Circuit, and was intended to bring major touring acts to Austin. It hosted vaudeville performers including the Marx Brothers and later also presented silent films with live musical accompaniment.

In 1930, as the theater shifted more heavily toward motion pictures, it underwent an extensive remodel and reopened as the Paramount Theatre, a name connected to Paramount-Publix, the theater's new owner. The renovation added carpeting, upholstered seating, air conditioning, a sound system, and a large illuminated blade sign reading "Paramount". The theater subsequently presented Paramount studio films and premieres, often alongside live performances or stage appearances.

In 1941, the theater was purchased by the Margaret Reed Estate. In 1957 and 1958, the facade was redesigned, a marquee was installed over the canopy, and the seats and concession stand were replaced or expanded. In November 1963, the building's facade received another renovation, during which the signature blade sign was removed for refurbishment; the sign was never reinstalled, and its fate was not determined.

By the 1970s, the popularity of television and suburban movie theaters had contributed to declining attendance at the Paramount, and the building had fallen into disrepair. According to the theater's history, the building had been slated to become a Holiday Inn before preservation efforts began. In 1975, proprietors John M. Bernardoni, Charles Eckerman, and Stephen L. Scott formed a nonprofit group to restore the building. Local philanthropist Roberta Crenshaw, who owned a 50% stake in the building through her late husband's estate, donated her half of the trust to the nonprofit, while the other half of the trust offered a 99-year lease.

In 1976, the theater's listing on the National Register of Historic Places qualified the venue for federal restoration funds. Renovations began in September 1977 following a $1.85 million grant from the federal government, which was also used to spur economic development in Downtown Austin.

=== Restoration and later programming ===
The restoration also returned live performance to a stage that had been largely unused during the theater's decline. The venue marked the return of live performances with an April 22, 1976 concert by Dave Brubeck and later presented touring and professional stage productions including Equus, West Side Story, King Lear, The Zoo Story, and Antigone.

By the early 1980s, the Paramount had reestablished itself as a major Austin arts venue, presenting film premieres, touring shows, and in-house theatrical productions. Beginning with a November 1982 production of Deathtrap starring Leslie Nielsen, the theater produced a series of touring stage productions, including shows starring E. G. Marshall and Martin Landau.

The Paramount's stage programming during this period also included Greater Tuna, the Austin-created comedy by Jaston Williams, Joe Sears, and Ed Howard. The theater's history describes the 1982 Paramount staging as its biggest stage success of the era and states that the show outsold all non-sporting entertainment in Austin. In 1990, A Tuna Christmas, starring Williams and Sears, made its Texas stage debut at the Paramount and ran for five weeks.

The theater later served as a venue for the Austin-based Big Stinkin' International Improv & Sketch Comedy Festival in 1996, 1997, and 1999, with Paramount festival programming that included the Austin troupe Monks' Night Out and appearances by sketch and improv groups such as The State. The 1999 festival also used the Paramount for a King of the Hill screening and question-and-answer session with Austinite creator Mike Judge and co-creator Greg Daniels.

In 2000, the Paramount merged with the neighboring State Theatre to form the Austin Theatre Alliance, the nonprofit organization that operates both venues.

In 2008, the organization created a formal youth education department, Paramount Academy for the Arts. Its Literacy to Life / Story Wranglers program began with a third-grade classroom at Matthews Elementary School and used arts-integrated lessons to turn students' original writing into live performance.

In 2012, the Austin Theatre Alliance created and launched the annual Moontower Comedy Festival.

In 2015, the theater embarked on an effort to recreate the signature blade sign that was lost in 1963. Since there were no known architectural or engineering plans for the original sign, the designers analyzed old footage of the theatre that included the sign. On September 23, 2015, the blade sign was lit for the first time in over 50 years.

The professional production staff for the Paramount Theatre has been provided by members of Local 205 of the International Alliance of Theatrical Stage Employees since opening day.

On May 30, 2025, the Paramount hosted the first public discussion panel about the revival of the Texas-based animated television series King of the Hill.

== Gallery ==
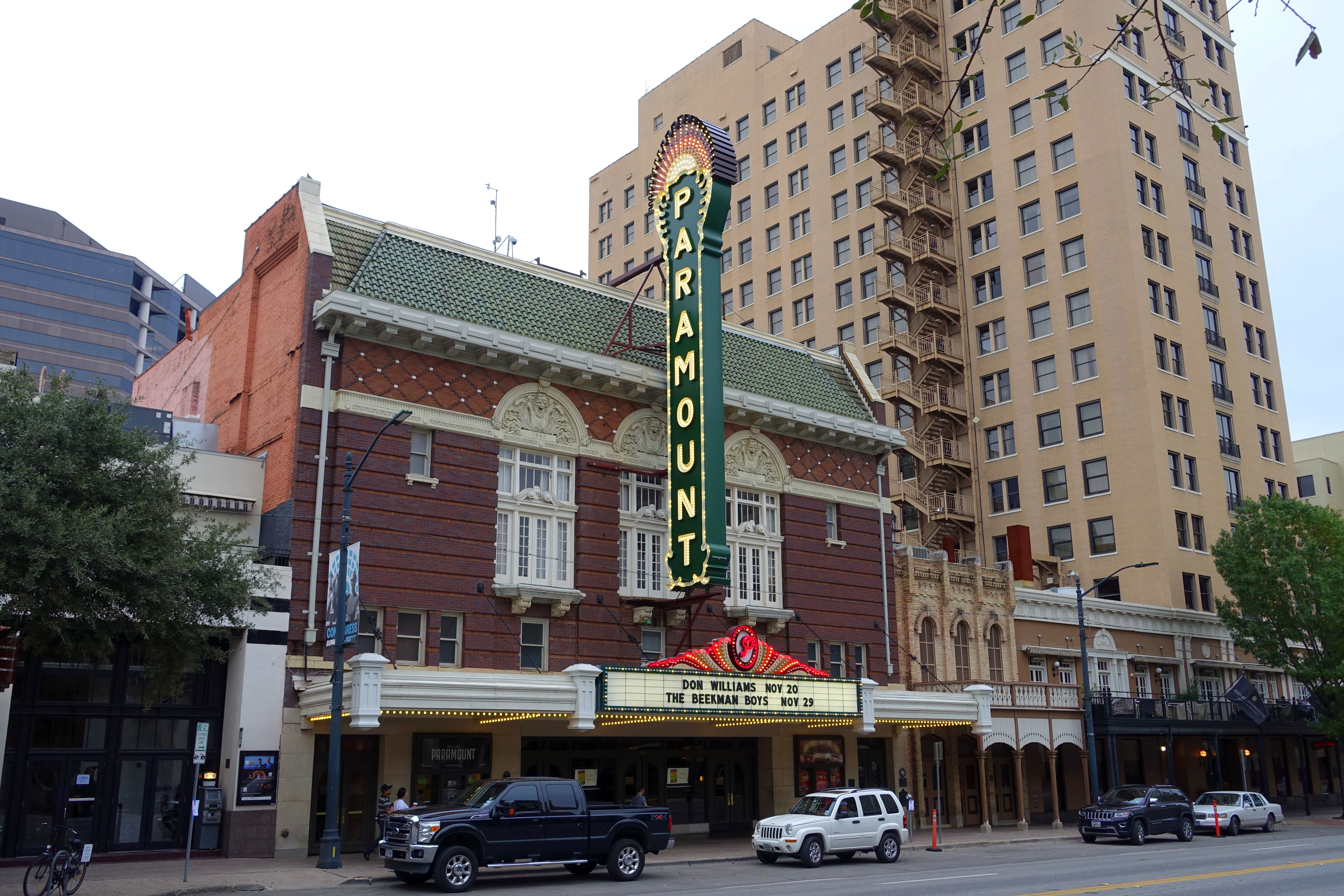
Paramount Theatre in 2015

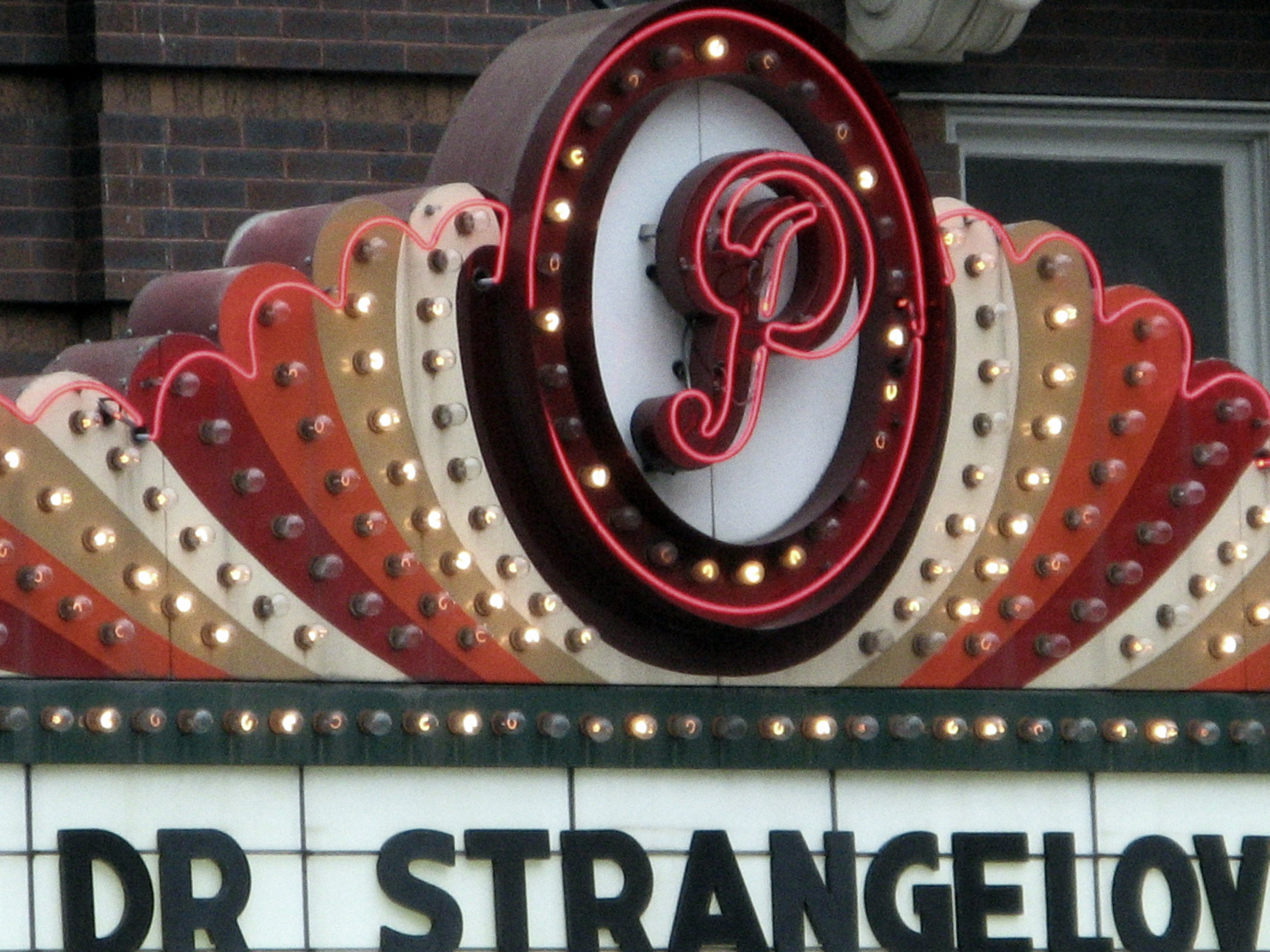
Marquee sign detail

Architectural elements

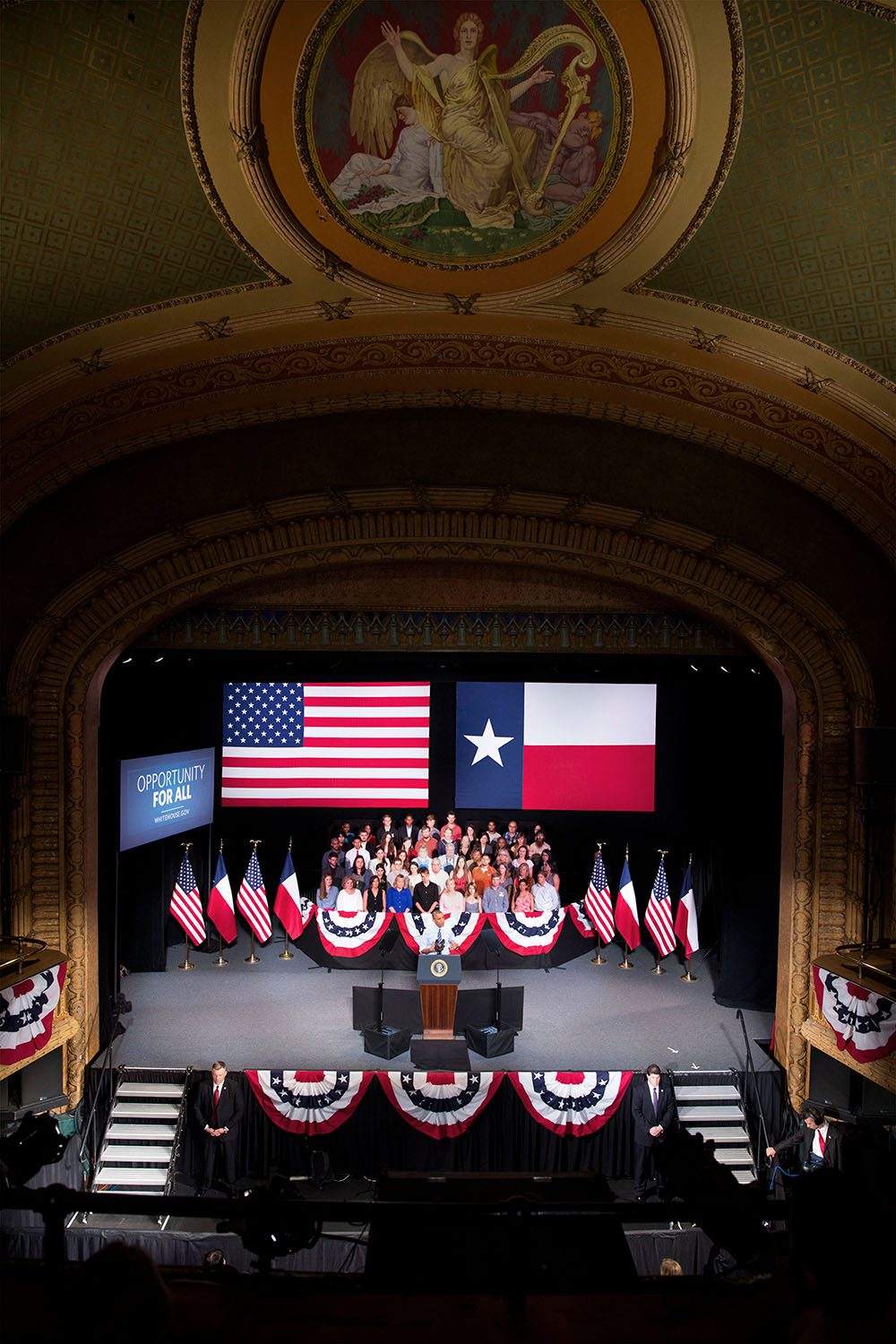
President Barack Obama delivers remarks at the theatre in 2014

== See also ==
- National Register of Historic Places listings in Travis County, Texas
