= The Monitors (film) =

1969 film by Jack Shea

- Theatrical release poster
- Directed by: Jack Shea
- Screenplay by: Myron J. Gold
- Based on: The Monitors (1966 novel) by Keith Laumer
- Produced by: Bernard Sahlins
- Starring: Guy Stockwell; Susan Oliver; Avery Schreiber; Sherry Jackson; Shepperd Strudwick; Keenan Wynn; Ed Begley; Larry Storch
- Cinematography: William Zsigmond
- Music by: Fred Kaz
- Production companies: Bell & Howell Productions; Wilding Inc.; Second City Productions
- Distributed by: Commonwealth United Entertainment
- Release date: October 8, 1969 (New York)
- Running time: 92 minutes
- Country: United States
- Language: English

The Monitors is a 1969 American satirical science fiction film directed by Jack Shea and starring Guy Stockwell, Susan Oliver, Avery Schreiber, Sherry Jackson, Shepperd Strudwick, Keenan Wynn, Ed Begley, and Larry Storch. Shot in Chicago, it was the first film production of the city's Second City comedy troupe and was coproduced and financed by the Bell and Howell film-equipment manufacturing company (then based in nearby Skokie) in an effort to establish Chicago as a film production center. It is based on the 1966 novel by Keith Laumer.

== Plot ==
Earth has been taken over by a benign group of aliens known as the Monitors, gentlemanly figures clad in black overcoats and bowler hats. They are dedicated to suppressing humanity's propensities for violence, sex, war, and trouble, enforcing their ethos with spray cans of a pacifying gas and with television ads praising the Monitors' rule—the latter featuring cameos by a variety of comedic actors, as well as bandleader Xavier Cugat and Illinois senator Everett Dirksen.

A conflict with the Monitors, inspired by the outrageous antics of a street preacher, leads to the flight of movie actress Barbara, who is a collaborator with the Monitors, along with free-lance pilot Harry and Harry's brother Max, and their spiriting away by the "preacher", who turns out to be a leader of SCRAG or "Secret Counter Retaliatorial Group", an anti-Monitor resistance group. After a series of vicissitudes, with Harry among the Monitors and Barbara and Max among the SCRAG forces, the principals are reunited. They leave Barbara and fly off to Washington, D.C., in an attempt to foil a SCRAG plot to bomb Monitor headquarters.

The Monitors, who have been aware of all these events, decide that human beings are not worthy of their leadership and depart. Humanity is freed to return to its violent and corrupt ways.

== Cast ==
- Guy Stockwell as Harry Jordan, a former U.S. Air Force flying ace. As the film begins, Harry has had a series of failed jobs and is struggling to adjust to life under the Monitors. He resents what he considers to be their illegitimate authority and interferes in the Monitors' police action to quell a public disturbance
- Susan Oliver as Barbara Cole, a famous actress who idealistically admires the efforts of the Monitors to eliminate conflicts and improve social conditions
- Avery Schreiber as Max Jordan, Harry's brother
- Sherry Jackson as Mona, an unwilling student at the Monitors' re-education "school". She becomes attracted to Harry and agrees to help him escape from the hands of his captors.
- Shepperd Strudwick as Tersh Jeterax, the Monitor leader. Jeterax is wholly dedicated to their cause of peace and social justice. He also serves as a wise counselor to Barbara, even though by the story's end he finally admits he cannot understand the subtleties of human emotions.
- Keenan Wynn as General Blackwish, the leader of SCRAG. He has a compound just outside Chicago from which he plans to destroy the local headquarters of the Monitors with the implosion bomb "and threaten the rest".
- Ed Begley as the president of the United States. After the Monitors gained control of the United States, the president has little to do but sit in the White House, completing crossword puzzles. He no longer has any power, but stays in office expecting that a grassroots uprising will overthrow the Monitors.
- Larry Storch as Colonel Stutz. Formerly a feed salesman, the colonel is now the right-hand man to Gen. Blackwish.

Cameo appearances in the film include Alan and Adam Arkin, Xavier Cugat, Everett Dirksen, Stubby Kaye, and Jackie Vernon.

== Release ==
The film was due to open November 12, 1969, but was brought forward a month due to the poor performance of another film and opened in more than 30 theaters in the New York area on October 8, 1969.

== Reception ==
In his review of The Monitors, The New York Times reviewer Howard Thompson remarked that the film "clips along with considerable verve" but that the "endless wisecracks seem none too wise or witty, or, for that matter, new". The entry on the film in The Encyclopedia of Science Fiction, on the other hand, calls it "an oddity, which flopped badly". A TV Guide review notes that it is "full of funny skits" but concludes, "As a whole, however, this is a disappointing film."

The film scholar Vivian Sobchack has noted that the "short and simple jingle dealing with the Monitors and their ability to bring happiness" used recurrently in the film serves to spoof "the incantations and sacred songs attendent [sic] to the selling of material goods and politicians".

The film grossed a disappointing $50,000 in its first week from 24 theaters in New York on a double bill with (A Session with) The Committee.

== See also ==
- List of American films of 1969
