= Blue Lake, California =

City in California, United States

- City
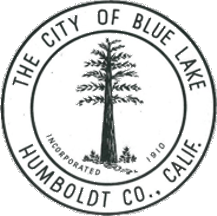
- Seal
- Interactive map of Blue Lake, California
- Coordinates: 40°52′58″N 123°59′02″W
- Country: United States
- State: California
- County: Humboldt
- Incorporated: April 23, 1910

Government
  - Type: Mayor-council government
  - Mayor: John Sawatzky
  - City Manager: Amanda Mager

Area
  - Total: 0.62 sq mi (1.61 km^{2})
  - Land: 0.59 sq mi (1.54 km^{2})
  - Water: 0.031 sq mi (0.08 km^{2}) 4.8%
- Elevation: 130 ft (40 m)

Population (2020)
  - Total: 1,208
  - Density: 2,035.1/sq mi (785.75/km^{2})
- Time zone: UTC-8 (Pacific (PST))
  - Summer (DST): UTC-7 (PDT)
- ZIP code: 95525
- Area code: 707
- FIPS code: 06-07162
- GNIS feature IDs: 1658083, 2409868
- Website: bluelake.ca.gov

Blue Lake (formerly Scottsville) is a city in Humboldt County, California, United States. Blue Lake is located on the Mad River in a deep valley, 16 miles (26 km) northeast of Eureka, at an elevation of 131 feet (40 m). Its population is 1,208 as of the 2020 census, down from 1,253 from the 2010 census.

== Geography and climate ==
According to the United States Census Bureau, the city has a total area of 0.6 square miles (1.6 km^{2}), over 95% of which is land.

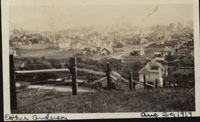
Cityscape of Blue Lake looking to Korbel

Climate data for Blue Lake, California
Month	Jan	Feb	Mar	Apr	May	Jun	Jul	Aug	Sep	Oct	Nov	Dec	Year
Record high °F (°C)	71 (22)	74 (23)	83 (28)	95 (35)	103 (39)	108 (42)	113 (45)	111 (44)	105 (41)	96 (36)	74 (23)	69 (21)	113 (45)
Mean daily maximum °F (°C)	53 (12)	56 (13)	59 (15)	63 (17)	69 (21)	74 (23)	80 (27)	80 (27)	77 (25)	69 (21)	59 (15)	52 (11)	66 (19)
Mean daily minimum °F (°C)	38 (3)	39 (4)	40 (4)	42 (6)	47 (8)	51 (11)	55 (13)	54 (12)	51 (11)	46 (8)	41 (5)	38 (3)	45 (7)
Record low °F (°C)	12 (−11)	19 (−7)	26 (−3)	28 (−2)	30 (−1)	34 (1)	40 (4)	40 (4)	36 (2)	26 (−3)	22 (−6)	7 (−14)	7 (−14)
Average precipitation inches (mm)	8.30 (211)	6.83 (173)	6.22 (158)	4.40 (112)	2.20 (56)	1.06 (27)	0.24 (6.1)	0.24 (6.1)	0.81 (21)	2.86 (73)	6.09 (155)	9.78 (248)	49.03 (1,246.2)
Average snowfall inches (cm)	0.5 (1.3)	0.1 (0.25)	0.3 (0.76)	0 (0)	0 (0)	0 (0)	0 (0)	0 (0)	0 (0)	0 (0)	0.1 (0.25)	0.8 (2.0)	1.8 (4.6)

== History ==
Present Blue Lake comprises "old" Blue Lake, Powersville, and Scottsville. In 1854, Augusta Bates settled in the Scottsville area and sold to Brice M. Stokes in 1862. In 1861, the 13-acre Blue Lake was formed from flooding of the north fork of Mad River, and it gave the town a resort atmosphere. As the river changed course in the 1920s, the lake disappeared to become what today is a small pond on private property.

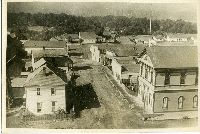
Looking South on H Street Blue Lake, date unknown

In 1866, William Scott purchased land from Brice M. Stokes and established "Scott's Farm," later becoming Scottsville. Powersville was established in 1869 by David Powers on land originally claimed by Augusta Bates, Brice M. Stokes and William Scott.

In 1876 a post office opened, named "Mad River." The post office named Blue Lake was established in 1878. The town of Blue Lake was incorporated on April 11, 1910.

=== Lumber industry ===
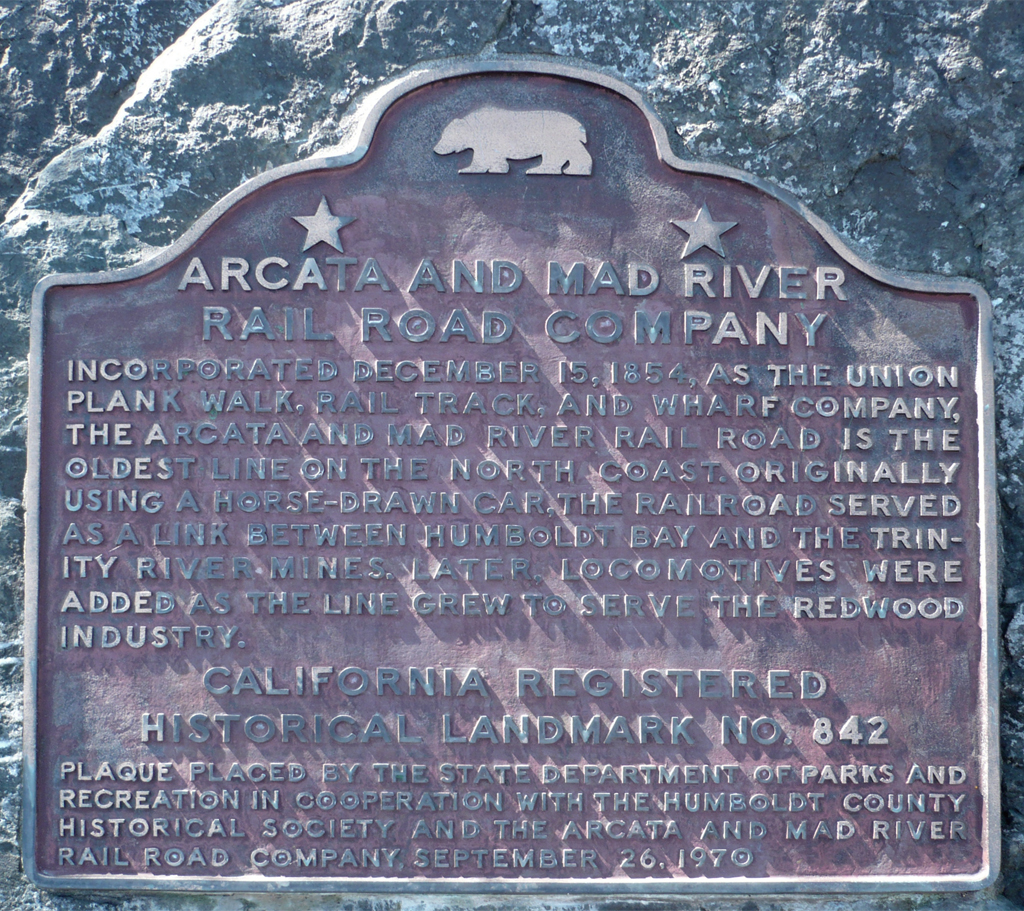
The Arcata and Mad River Railroad is California Registered Historical Landmark Number 842, located in downtown Blue Lake.

The lumber industry shipped wood down the Arcata and Mad River Railroad. During the 1950s, timber shipped from Blue Lake included from Levitt Brothers own lumberyard and nail factory from which lumber and nails were sent to the four Levittown developments in the eastern U.S.

== Demographics ==
Historical population
Census	Pop.	Note	%±
1910	507		—
1920	441		−13.0%
1930	555		25.9%
1940	503		−9.4%
1950	824		63.8%
1960	1,234		49.8%
1970	1,112		−9.9%
1980	1,201		8.0%
1990	1,235		2.8%
2000	1,135		−8.1%
2010	1,253		10.4%
2020	1,208		−3.6%
U.S. Decennial Census

=== 2020 census ===
As of the 2020 census, Blue Lake had a population of 1,208. The population density was 2,033.7 inhabitants per square mile (785.2/km^{2}), and the whole population lived in households.

The age distribution was 229 people (19.0%) under the age of 18, 62 people (5.1%) aged 18 to 24, 333 people (27.6%) aged 25 to 44, 338 people (28.0%) aged 45 to 64, and 246 people (20.4%) who were 65 years of age or older. The median age was 43.6 years. For every 100 females, there were 86.1 males, and for every 100 females age 18 and over, there were 84.4 males age 18 and over.

There were 541 households, of which 159 (29.4%) had children under the age of 18 living in them. Of all households, 200 (37.0%) were married-couple households, 63 (11.6%) were cohabiting couple households, 171 (31.6%) had a female householder with no spouse or partner present, and 107 (19.8%) had a male householder with no spouse or partner present. 161 households (29.8%) were one person, and 64 (11.8%) were one person aged 65 or older. The average household size was 2.23. There were 316 families (58.4% of all households).

0.0% of residents lived in urban areas, while 100.0% lived in rural areas.

There were 569 housing units, of which 541 (95.1%) were occupied. Of the occupied units, 314 (58.0%) were owner-occupied and 227 (42.0%) were occupied by renters. The remaining 28 units (4.9%) were vacant. The homeowner vacancy rate was 0.0% and the rental vacancy rate was 3.0%.

Racial composition as of the 2020 census
Race	Number	Percent
White	983	81.4%
Black or African American	5	0.4%
American Indian and Alaska Native	61	5.0%
Asian	11	0.9%
Native Hawaiian and Other Pacific Islander	2	0.2%
Some other race	24	2.0%
Two or more races	122	10.1%
Hispanic or Latino (of any race)	96	7.9%

=== Income and poverty ===
In 2023, the US Census Bureau estimated that the median household income was $52,813, and the per capita income was $40,169. About 7.1% of families and 25.4% of the population were below the poverty line.

== Government ==
In the state legislature, Blue Lake is in the 2nd senatorial district, represented by Democrat Mike McGuire, and the 2nd Assembly district, represented by Democrat Chris Rogers.

Federally, Blue Lake is in California's 2nd congressional district, represented by Democrat Jared Huffman.

== Notable people ==
- Carlo Mazzone-Clementi, founder of Dell'Arte International School of Physical Theatre
- Garth Iorg, American MLB baseball player
- Dane Iorg, American MLB baseball player
