= Improv Bandits =

The Improv Bandits are an improvisational theatre group based in Auckland, New Zealand. Founded by Wade Jackson, the troupe developed an approach to improvisation that emphasized storytelling rather than the competitive Theatresports format then popular in New Zealand. The group has performed internationally and appeared onstage with Wayne Brady, Colin Mochrie, and Dan Castellaneta. They have been described as "one of New Zealand's most successful comedy ventures".

== History ==
=== Formation and early performances ===
Jackson formed the Improv Bandits in 1997, when Theatresports was still the dominant form of organised improvisation in New Zealand. He wanted to focus on storytelling, rather than a competitive format. The troupe landed a venue to perform late-night Friday shows at Auckland's SiLO Theatre, which later became the Basement Theatre.

In addition to Jackson, cast members were Colin Mitchell, Geoff Simmons, James McLaughlin, Mark Scott, and Jason Webb.

=== International performances ===
Jackson, Gilbert and Webb travelled from Auckland to Austin, Texas, for the fourth annual Big Stinkin' International Improv & Sketch Comedy Festival in 1999. To finance their trip, Gilbert sold his 1982 Toyota Corona and Webb borrowed money from his parents. Austin American-Statesman writer Hank Stuever, who spent time with them during the festival, wrote a front-page feature about the group.

Jackson saw a Walt Disney World flier advertising auditions for comedic actors at the registration table. Host troupe Monks' Night Out member Lisa Pedersen warned him against it. She told him about a friend performing improv aboard a cruise ship who had left a telephone message declaring that he was having a "fan-diddly-tastic" time. She joked he must be living in "his own private Disney hell".

The troupe's motto was "No scripts, no gimmicks, no safety nets". Jackson, Gilbert and Webb performed at the John Henry Faulk Living Theatre before an audience of 49 people, most of them other comedians attending the festival. They improvised a poem about one audience member, acted out another person's day at work, and led the audience in a song.

The Bandits' second Austin performance was at Maggie Mae's. Jackson and Gilbert auditioned for the American television program Whose Line Is It Anyway?. Gilbert won an international Maestro improvisation competition.

The Bandits performed at Chicago's Annoyance Theatre during the Chicago Improv Festival. The following year the group established a presence in Wellington, where Geoff Simmons and Jackson created another Improv Bandits company. Its performances at BATS Theatre and the youth arts venue Zeal continued until 2003.

In 2002, the Improv Bandits won the World Cage Match competition at the Chicago Improv Festival. The company has performed in Montreal, Toronto, Vancouver, and New York.

=== The Covert Theatre and later work ===
After returning from overseas, Jackson opened a dedicated improvisational theatre in Auckland. The Covert Theatre opened in 2001. It was the company's home until the original venue closed in 2005.

The Bandits continued performing after the closure, appearing at comedy festivals and in other Auckland venues. The troupe marked its twentieth anniversary in 2017 with a performance featuring Colin Mochrie of Whose Line Is It Anyway?.

They returned to performing regularly at the re-established Covert Theatre in Auckland. The company continues to teach improvisation.

== See also ==
- List of improvisational theatre companies
