= Dell'Arte International School of Physical Theatre =

Coordinates: 40.8809°N 123.9887°W

The Dell'Arte International School of Physical Theatre is a private school in Blue Lake, California. It offers summer workshops, and a study abroad program in Bali. The school also has a professional company in residence, the Dell'Arte Company.

== History ==
Founded in 1971 by Carlo Mazzone-Clementi and Jane Hill to bring the European physical training tradition to the United States and to develop actor-creators through training in mime, mask, movement and ensemble creation, the original productions were in San Francisco. In 1973, Mazzone-Clementi and Hill came to Humboldt County where Hill had a teaching position at College of the Redwoods. Together they put on the Grand Comedy Festival at Qual-a-wa-loo with Mazzone-Clementi serving as the festival's artistic director for six years.

In 1974, the couple purchased the Oddfellows Hall in Blue Lake and the Dell'Arte School opened its doors in 1975. The following year, Mazzone and actors Joan Schirle and Jon'Paul Cook founded the Dell'Arte Company with the goal of establishing a company/school-school/company along the lines of Jacques Copeau's Vieux Columbier, and the hope to create a resident ensemble, the Dell'Arte Players Company. The first tour was mounted in 1977. Artists engaged for the first production, The Loon's Rage, included director and co-author Jael Weisman, designer Alain Schons, and actor Michael Fields (in 2013 the company's producing artistic director), who continued as the nucleus of the new company, with Donald Forrest joining in 1978.

Originally called the Dell'Arte School of Mime and Comedy, the school's name was changed to the Dell'Arte International School of Physical Theatre in the late 1980s as a result of the narrowing definition of "mime" and a desire to investigate a broader vision of theatre and the work of the contemporary actor. School Directors have included Carlo Mazzone-Clementi, Jon’Paul Cook, Alain Schons, Ralph Hall, Peter Buckley, Jane Hill, Daniel Stein, Joan Schirle, Ronlin Foreman, and Lauren Wilson

== Influence ==
Since 1976, the company has trained and influenced hundreds of performing artists and ensembles from around the world, including Daniel O. Smith and W. Stuart McDowell, who subsequently founded the Riverside Shakespeare Company in New York City, which incorporated a "Green Show" of commedia-like elements and utilized a performance style greatly influenced by Carlo Mazzone-Clementi in his first years at Blue Lake, 1971-1972.

Dell'Arte is a school of the actor-creator. Its physical theatre encompasses training in acting, voice, movement, devised theatre and related physical skills, with specific attention to the areas of mask, commedia dell'arte, tragedy, and clown. The Dell'Arte International School of Physical Theatre is associated with the Dell'Arte Company, an ensemble of artists who are known internationally for their unique style. Founded as the "Grand Comedy Festival of Qual-a-wa-loo" in 1971, since 1991 Dell'Arte has hosted the Mad River Festival in June and July, concurrent with their summer workshops. The festival draws participants from all over the world.

== Pedagogy ==
Dell’Arte International is the U.S. center for the exploration, development, training and performance of the actor-creator. Its mission is to employ and revitalize the traditional physical theatre forms to explore contemporary concerns.

In addition to being an international center for performance, training, and research, Dell’Arte has been active in community building, service, education, community-based productions, classes, benefits, and many service-related activities.

== Academics ==
=== Professional Training Program ===
The Professional Training Program (PTP) is a one-year program for students ready to undertake a journey into the realms of actor-created theatre. This program is open to all performers, with or without a college degree. The PTP includes training in the FM Alexander Technique, physical awareness and responsiveness, vocal and movement improvisation, as well as the study of mask, clown, melodrama, and commedia dell'arte, with ongoing research into the process of making theatre. Investigation of theatre dynamics, the actor and the space, character and relationship takes place through assignments presented weekly in Performance Lab. The PTP runs concurrently with the first year of the MFA; therefore, PTP alumni may apply for matriculation into the second year of the MFA program.

=== MFA ===
The MFA in Ensemble Based Physical Theatre is a three-year program for advanced students who wish to undertake a performance path of actor-created, physically dynamic ensemble theatre making. Students are admitted by application, video audition, and on-site callback.

=== Summer workshop ===
The DAI Summer Intensive is a three-week immersion in the actor-training methodology of the Dell’Arte International School of Physical Theatre. The training aims toward the creation of a dynamic theatre, in which the embodied actor plays with freedom, authenticity and visceral power within the vibrant and poetic space of the stage.

=== Study abroad: Bali ===
During the three and a half weeks of formal study, classes meet five days a week. Students choose a study emphasis of either mask carving or shadow puppetry. Sometimes the study takes place in a classroom setting, sometimes outdoors, and most often in its traditional setting at village and temple ceremonies.

In addition to their core area of study, all students study kecak, the rhythmic vocal chant, as well as participate in alternating yoga/Alexander Technique, ensemble voice/chant sessions, plus symposiums on the links between Balinese and western mask performance traditions.

== Community work ==
Dell’Arte is made up of a professional touring company, a full-time professional training school offering MFA and certificate programs, the annual summer Mad River Festival, study abroad programs, and community partnerships with the Blue Lake School, the Humboldt Folklife Festival, and more. As one of a handful of rural professional ensemble theatres in the United States, Dell’Arte is recognized for its contribution to American theatre via its non-urban point of view, its 40-year history of ensemble practice, and its actor-training programs.

=== Theatre of Place ===
The Dell’Arte Company's first touring production in 1977, The Loon’s Rage, pioneered ‘theatre of place,” a concept based on local themes, issues and characters. In addition to original works created for international festivals, experimental productions, and adaptations, the Company continues to generate locally based work each year. In 2010, DAI celebrated Blue Lake's centennial with an original opera, Blue Lake, The Opera, and 2011-12's Mary Jane: The Musical explored the chief economic engine of our region: marijuana.

==== Mary Jane: The Musical ====
"Behind its original songs and humor, the play about marijuana cultivation is a bittersweet, multi-generational tale that celebrates the plant while laying bare the industry's dark side." - Los Angeles Times

In 2011, Dell’Arte International staged the world premiere of Mary Jane: The Musical at its annual Mad River Festival. Partnering with twelve local songwriters, the show featured Humboldt County-centric characters facing various issues in the marijuana milieu. Mary Jane quickly gained notoriety, sold out all its performances, and became the highest-grossing show in Dell’Arte's 35-year production history. ‘MJ’ won the hearts of local followers who demanded Dell’Arte bring it back for a second year, which they did in Mary Jane the Musical II: The Diva Returns, and again in 2015 with Mary Jane: The Musical III.

In partnership with Emmy-nominated filmmaker, John Howarth, Dell’Arte transformed Mary Jane: The Musical into a film, Mary Jane: A Musical Potumentary, exploring different facets of the marijuana industry in Humboldt County. Mary Jane sought to examine at all aspects of the local pot culture, from its regional economic importance to the grim particulars of violence and environmental degradation. The film fused the staged production and its artistic perspectives with documentary footage of the marijuana-growing world, illustrating the reality behind the fiction. The film premiered in 2016 and won Best Musical Film at the 2016 Oregon Independent Film Festival. It will be available as VOD (video on demand) in Fall of 2017.

=== Grants ===
==== James Irvine Foundation ====
In 2012, DAI was awarded a 3-year, $225,000 grant from the James Irvine Foundation to support the expansion of rural arts programs and increase participation opportunities for communities throughout the northcoast region of California. The grant supported projects like students’ Rural Residency program, The Dell’Arte Company's free annual holiday show tour, and our MFA's Community Based Arts Projects. In 2015 Dell'Arte became part of the Irvine Foundation's New California Arts Fund NCAF cohort, with three years of funding specifically to research community engagement.

==== ArtPlace America ====
In 2013, DAI was awarded a $350,000 grant from ArtPlace America to support the creation of the Mad River Industrial Art Park. Through curated programs, free public events, mini-grants to Blue Lakers for community enhancement, and the expansion of its Mad River Festival, Dell’Arte connected art, industry, and cultural work to promote economic development in the city. This project was also supported by the California Arts Council, Headwaters, and local sponsors.

=== Community-based MFA project ===
Since 2007, third-year MFA students have spent seven weeks serving local non-profit organizations by developing theatre pieces in non-traditional venues with the goal of assisting the non-profit in its objectives.

=== Student community service ===
From serving breakfast at the local Mad River Grange hall, to clowning for children at an elementary school fundraiser, to planting native flora in a marsh restoration project, students fulfill required community service hours in a variety of ways.

=== Rural Residency ===
Students in the one-year Professional Training Program end their year of studies with a Rural Residency. Two isolated communities are chosen each year to host a group of about 15 Dell'Arte students for a 10-day residency. The students, in turn, create a show for the community and offer workshops to children and adults. The communities of Bridgeville, Petrolia, Forks of Salmon, Orleans, Whale Gulch (Mendocino County) Spring Valley (Lake County) and Takilma, OR have benefited from this program. In 2010, the students assisted Yurok tribal member Willard Carlson in developing an off-the-grid site for traditional healing at Ah-Pah Creek.

=== Annual Holiday Show ===
With the help of local business sponsors, Dell’Arte brings free professional touring shows around the Northcoast Region. Local food banks are the beneficiaries, as audience bring a canned food item as their admission ‘ticket.’
