= Oui Be Negroes =

Sketch comedy

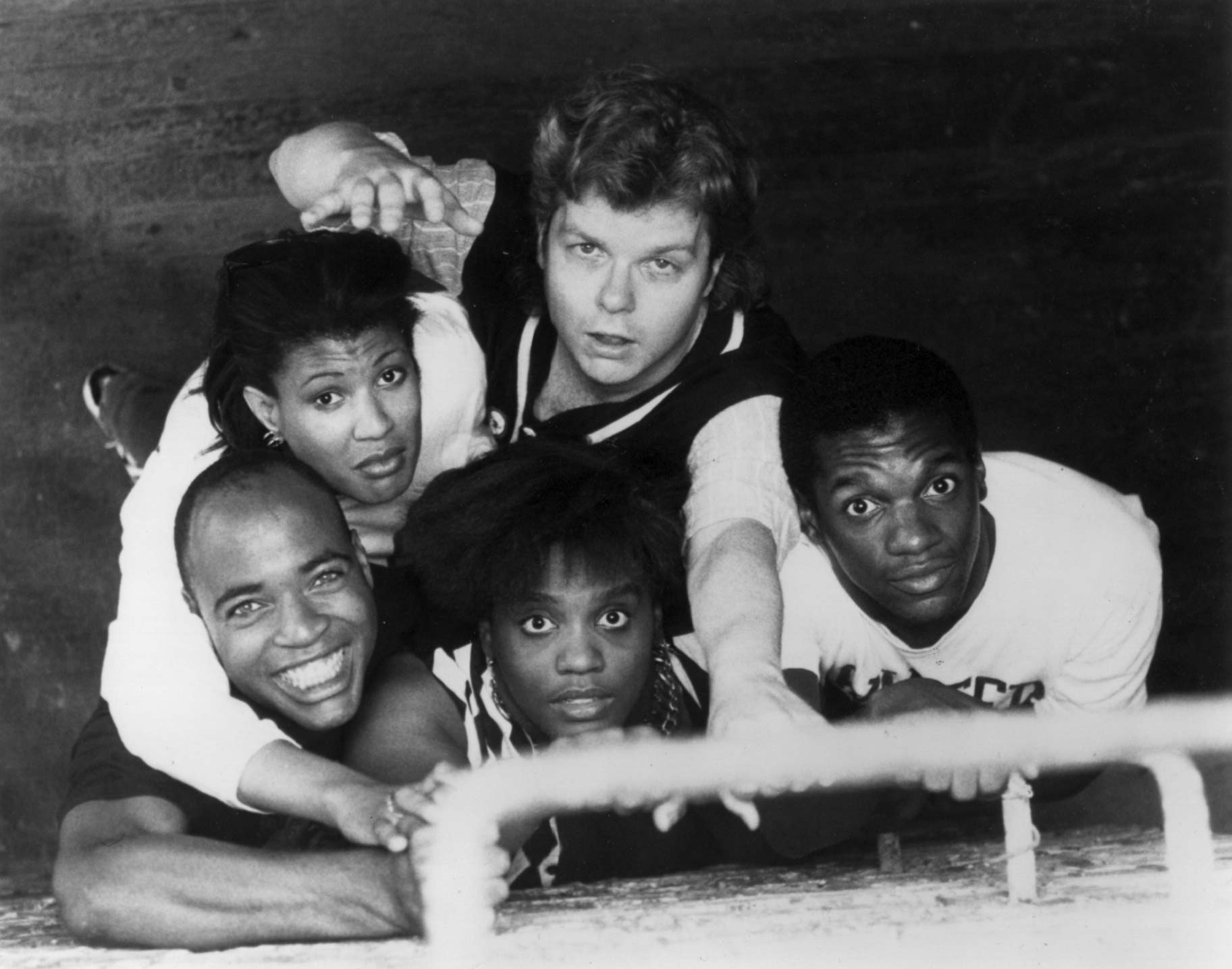
Oui Be Negroes, original Chicago cast, 1994

Oui Be Negroes is an African-American improvisational sketch comedy ensemble, founded by artistic director Shaun Landry and director Hans Summers. They had worked together for many years in Chicago with the Underground Theatre Conspiracy, and proposed the idea of an African-American sketch and improvisational comedy troupe geared specifically toward social and political humor.

== Background ==
The Underground Theatre Conspiracy (UTC) was founded by Hans Summers in 1985 with fellow performers from The Players Workshop at The Second City. The show was entitled "Fooglewoogle-The Multi-Media Comedy". After two runs, Shaun Landry was added to UTC's roster of performers in 1986, one of three African-Americans performing improv comedy in Chicago.

In 1990, Hans and Shaun decided to relocate the company to Seattle.

== History ==
In 1993, Landry and Summers assembled the original Oui Be Negroes ensemble, using actors discovered at the Second City Outreach Program, and they put on their first show at Café Voltaire in Chicago. According to Landry, the 'Oui' in the ensemble's name refers to African Americans who went to France in the 1920s and 1930s and became successful.

Oui Be Negroes presented satirical shows with titles like "Can We Dance with Yo Dates", "One Drop is All It Takes", "Once You Go Black", "All Coons Look Alike to Me" (inspired by the popular coon song of 1896). "The Artists Formerly Known as Oui Be Negroes" and "Absolute Negritude" in Chicago from 1994 to 1999 explored black culture and history. OBN performed in New York, Los Angeles, Austin, and Boston, as well as international shows in Canada and the Netherlands.

In 2000, Oui Be Negroes relocated from Chicago to San Francisco, where they continued to produce shows, such as "X", "To Pigmeat Markham Thanks for Everything, Spike Lee".

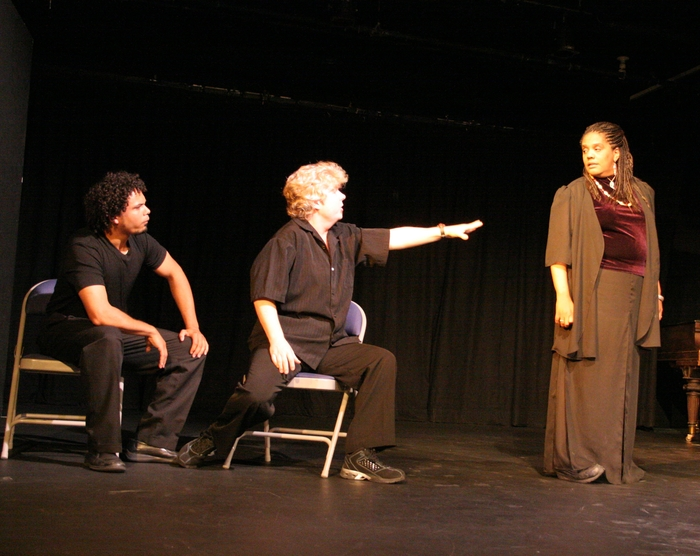
Marcus Sams, Hans Summers, and Shaun Landry at the San Francisco Improv Festival 2008

In 2009, Landry and Summers went to Los Angeles, where they produced the Oui Be Negroes show as well as duo performances as Landry & Summers at Improv Olympic West, The Second City, and the Avery Schreiber Theatre in North Hollywood. Their first extended duo show in Los Angeles was entitled "Yes, We Are F**king". Oui Be Negroes marked their 15th anniversary with a performance at the 12th Annual Chicago Improv Festival. Landry and Summers continued to perform in 2010 with "Interraciallicious" at M.I.'s Westside Comedy Theater in Santa Monica, California, and as a featured act for DuoFest 2010 in Philadelphia.
