= Esther's Follies =

Coordinates: 30°15′59″N 97°44′15″W

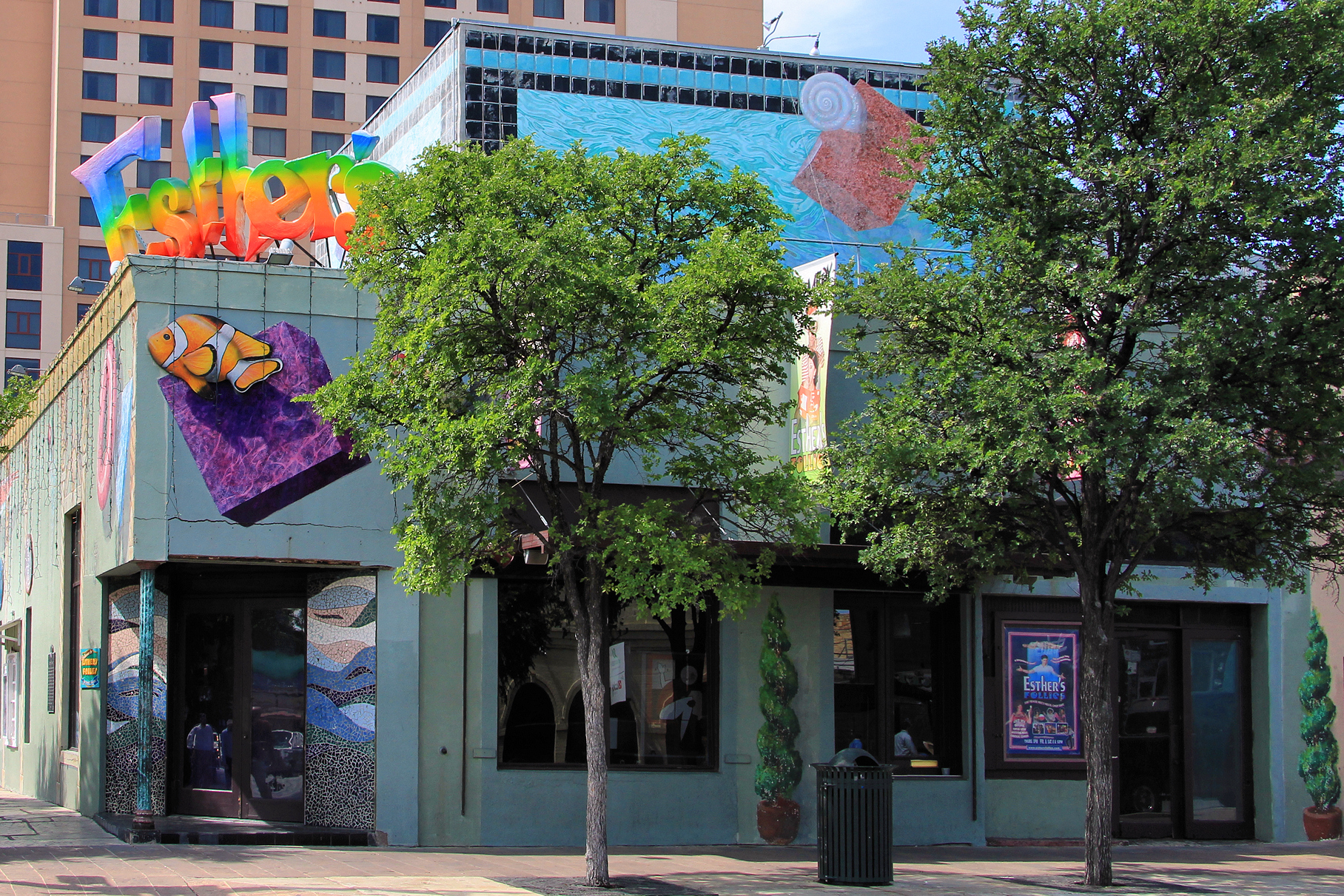
The Esther's Follies Theatre

Esther's Follies is a modern-day vaudeville theater on Sixth Street in downtown Austin, Texas. Named after actress Esther Williams, its fast-paced shows combine magic, juggling, singing, dancing, and comedy sketches about current events. Performances last about 90 minutes, including a short intermission, and run Thursday through Saturday evenings.

== History ==
Before founding Esther's Follies, Shannon Sedwick and Michael Shelton operated Liberty Lunch, a downtown Austin venue that opened on December 6, 1975. Shelton later recalled that skits and bands began there during the summer of 1976, and Sedwick described early theatrical and performance-art activity at the venue. A 1978 Austin American-Statesman account later quoted in a history of Liberty Lunch described Sedwick and Shelton as founders of "Liberty Lunch and then Esther's Follies".

Esther's Follies later moved into Esther's Pool, an old pool hall on Sixth Street named after swimmer and actress Esther Williams. Early performers with Esther's Follies included singer and comedian De Lewellen, who appeared with the troupe during its first years beginning in 1977.

The original Esther's Pool was destroyed by fire in the early 1980s. After the fire, Esther's Follies spent several lean seasons at the Ritz theater, which kept the troupe on Sixth Street but lacked the storefront window and intimate setting associated with Esther's Pool. By 1989, the Austin American-Statesman described Esther's Follies as enjoying renewed success after returning to a new storefront Pool on Sixth Street. Sedwick said the troupe had added new cast members and moved back into the new storefront Pool, where "things have been going gangbusters ever since".

Sedwick and Shelton opened The Velveeta Room in 1988 to accommodate stand-up comedy aspirations among the Esther's Follies cast. Kerry Awn, a longtime Esther's cast member whose Ronnie Velveeta character gave the club its name, later described the early Velveeta Room as "Esther's private little clubhouse". The club later moved to a location adjacent to Esther's Follies in 1994.

The troupe later moved through several Sixth Street locations, including the Ritz and the building now occupied by Coyote Ugly, before settling into its current home at 525 East Sixth Street. By its twentieth anniversary in 1997, The Austin Chronicle described Esther's Follies as a homegrown comedy troupe closely associated with the development of East Sixth Street as an entertainment district. The article characterized the troupe's early format as a changing weekly mixture of vaudeville comedy, music, dance, literary parody, topical humor, and other theatrical material. It also noted that the group had survived multiple changes of location and had played to an estimated one million people by that time.

== Esther's Pool as a venue ==
The reopened Esther's Pool functioned as a Sixth Street performance venue as well as the home of Esther's Follies. In 1989, the Austin American-Statesman contrasted the new storefront Pool with the troupe's earlier period at the Ritz, noting that the Ritz had kept Esther's Follies on Sixth Street but lacked the storefront window and intimate setting associated with Esther's Pool.

In addition to the regular Esther's Follies show, Esther's Pool was periodically used for other arts, theater, comedy, awards, and festival events. A 1982 issue of The Austin Chronicle listed the original Esther's Pool for non-Follies arts programming, including the theatrical comedy Tiny Boas and A Tribute to Black Women Artists.

In February 1996, Disney/Touchstone Features selected a mixed bill at Esther's Pool featuring Monks' Night Out and the Asylum Street Spankers for scouting while seeking improvisational comedy talent for television projects. In 1997, The Austin Chronicle listed Esther's Pool among the venues for the second Big Stinkin' International Improv & Sketch Comedy Festival, which featured more than 20 improv troupes. That August, Esther's Follies took a weekend off to make room for the Lone Star Comedy Jamboree, a regional sketch and improvisational comedy event that brought together seven ensembles from Austin, Dallas, and San Antonio. Participating Austin-based troupes included Monks' Night Out, Only 90% Effective, and KAIROS!, alongside visiting companies from elsewhere in Texas. The festival returned to Esther's Pool in 1998 and 1999, with the Chronicle's schedules listing repeated showcases at the venue during both Big Stinkin' III and Big Stinkin' IV. The room also hosted the evening showcase for the 1999 HBO Aspen Comedy Festival auditions, in which 12 finalists were selected from 108 comics.

In the 2000s, the venue continued to appear in Chronicle listings and features for theatre, guest comedy, and sketch events. The 2004 B. Iden Payne Awards ceremony was scheduled at Esther's Pool, and The Austin Chronicle later placed guest comedy and sketch events at the venue, including Queertown in 2005 and the Latino Comedy Project's ¡Loco Año Nuevo! in 2008.

== See also ==
- Music of Austin
