= The Hideout Theatre =

Improv theater and comedy venue in Austin, Texas

Coordinates: 30.3244°N 97.7259°W

The Hideout Theatre is an improvisational theatre and comedy venue in Austin, Texas. Sean Hill and Shana Merlin founded the theatre in 1999 at 617 Congress Avenue in downtown Austin. The building housed performance spaces, classrooms, and a coffeehouse until the Hideout left the location in 2026 after more than 26 years.

== History ==
=== Founding and early years, 1999–2004 ===
Before opening the Hideout, Hill performed with the alternative comedy troupe Monks' Night Out and We Could Be Heroes. Merlin performed with Los Paranoias, as well as We Could Be Heroes with Hill.

Hill and Merlin converted the largely dormant two-story building at 617 Congress Avenue into a 74-seat black box theatre, a 50-seat cabaret, a workshop room, and a coffeehouse. Early improv shows used Theatresports formats, including the competitive game Micetro.

The Hideout rented its stages to other theatre companies at comparatively low rates. Early users included the State Theater Company, Salvage Vanguard Theater, and Austin Theater Co. The Austin Film Festival, South by Southwest, and MOMFest also approached the venue about using the space.

Classes were part of the Hideout from its early years. Its opening came near the end of the late-1990s Austin improv and festival boom, followed by several years of contraction in the local scene. Andy Crouch later managed the Hideout and served as artistic director of its house troupe Heroes of Comedy, which offered improv workshops and classes.

Jeremy Sweetlamb founded the Out of Bounds Improv Festival and Miniature Golf Tournament in 2002, and its first two-night festival was held entirely at the Hideout. The Hideout was also the Monday-night home of Cinescape, an experimental-film series presented by several Austin film and arts organizations. ProArts Collective staged Suzan-Lori Parks's Topdog/Underdog there in 2004.

=== Revival and ownership change, 2005–2009 ===
Austin improv began to rebound by 2005, with the Hideout and the growing Out of Bounds festival part of the revival.

By 2009, dozens of improv groups were using the Hideout as a home base and annual improv festivals were filling its stages, but the theatre was under financial pressure. Jessica Arjet, Kareem Badr, and Roy Janik acquired the theatre and coffeehouse that year.

=== Later years ===
The Hideout's annual improv marathon ran for 45 continuous hours in 2014. Eight improvisers remained in the marathon throughout while local troupes rotated through performances. Volunteers from Austin's improv community helped produce the marathon and other Hideout programming.

The theatre closed to public audiences in March 2020 during the COVID-19 pandemic. Members of Parallelogramophonograph, the Hideout's in-house improv troupe, created a virtual show with performers appearing from separate locations. The Hideout followed with other online performances and rebroadcasts while its stages were closed.

=== Leaving Congress Avenue ===
The Hideout was known particularly for long-form improvised plays and musicals. After the owner of 617 Congress Avenue planned to convert the building into a bar, the theatre announced that it would leave its longtime downtown home and signed a lease at Art Hub ATX near Interstate 35 and Woodward Street.

The final downtown performances were on March 20 and 21, 2026. After leaving Congress Avenue, the Hideout continued presenting shows at an annex at 5555 N. Lamar Boulevard.

== Shana Merlin ==
Shana Merlin is an American improvisational theatre performer, director, teacher, and applied-improvisation practitioner based in Austin, Texas who is best known for co-founding the theatre. She later established Merlin Works, an improvisational training organization.

Merlin's interest in improvisational theatre began as a teenager in Atlanta in 1995, when an improv show was canceled during the World Series. She received free passes and began returning to shows. Subsequently after moving to Austin, she successfully auditioned for and joined Los Paranoias, a hybridized improv and sketch comedy troupe directed by Pamela Ribon that included Jeremy Sweetlamb. Following the end of the run of Los Paranoias, she became a member of the improv troupe We Could Be Heroes.

Her involvement with We Could Be Heroes led to a job with Sean Hill establishing the Hideout Theatre. They opened the venue in 1999 as a home for improvisational theatre and affordable downtown performance space. Merlin helped build out the theatre, taught classes, directed shows, worked in the production office, and booked outside companies.

She was an original co-director of the Hideout's house troupe, Heroes of Comedy. She led women-only performances and training sessions there, giving female improvisers more opportunities to initiate scenes and play a wider range of characters.

In 2000, she presented the autobiographical one-woman show Today's Special: I'm Good Enough, I'm Smart Enough, and Doggone It … as her undergraduate senior thesis at the University of Texas, staged by Austin theatre director Louis Wells. The show combined personal stories, characters, songs, and audience participation around her anxiety about carrying a solo performance. A review in The Austin Chronicle praised her timing, charm, and willingness to use that insecurity as comic material while criticizing the closing song as sentimental.

=== Performance and women-centered comedy ===
Merlin was a founding member of Girls Girls Girls, an all-female Austin improv troupe that debuted in 2002 and specialized in long-form improvised musicals. By 2016, it was Austin's longest-running all-female musical improv troupe and one of the city's longest-running improv groups. Its later Boys of Summer series, brought male improvisers into the ensemble, changing the troupe's usual dynamics and giving its members a different approach to supporting a guest performer.

Girls Girls Girls created the Ladies Are Funny Festival (LAFF) in 2007. Merlin and troupe member Julie Lucas organized the first festival at the Hideout as a weekend for women comedians and improv troupes from Austin and other cities. Three years later, it had expanded from two days to four, with 29 acts from the United States and Canada. Merlin was an executive producer. New producers took over in 2011 and the festival moved beyond its original improv focus. The Austin Chronicle named LAFF a 2011 Best of Austin critics' pick. The sixth LAFF in 2012 was the final festival.

In 2009, Merlin conceived and directed Dusk: Improvised Tween Erotica, an improvised parody inspired by Twilight. Performers used the setting and conventions of Twilight while creating new stories from audience suggestions. Merlin originally planned only to direct, then joined the cast during rehearsals. After eight weeks of rehearsal under her direction, Gnap! Theater Projects and Merlin Works presented the show at Salvage Vanguard Theatre.

Dusk went to the 2010 Chicago Improv Festival. Festival co-founder Jonathan Pitts praised the way the show parodied its source genre while embracing it at the same time. Later in 2010, Dusk went to New York for a run at The Tank. Dread Central recommended the show and noted that its Austin opening had sold out.

=== Merlin Works ===
Merlin opened the Merlin Works Institute for Improvisation in 2008. Its classes covered short-form games, long-form narrative improv and musical improv, along with training for people using improvisation in communication outside performance.

In 2012, she considered closing Merlin Works after changes in her producing partnership and the demands of being a new parent. She did not. Instead, Merlin looked for a new home and producing partner. By the end of the year, the organization was preparing to move its adult classes and monthly performances to ZACH Theatre. Merlin Works later continued there with classes and performances.

=== Applied improvisation ===
In 2019, Merlin and retired physician Rob Milman led a session at the University of Texas at Austin's Health Communication Leadership Institute. The exercises dealt with nonverbal communication, finding common ground and responding to failure. In her 2021 TEDxUTAustin talk, Why Your Doctor Should Be an Improviser, she discussed using improv exercises with students at Dell Medical School to improve physician–patient communication. A KVUE feature that year showed Merlin putting the station's news team through improv-based team-building exercises. It also covered her work with medical students and couples communication training.

Texas Medical Liability Trust later featured Merlin in programs about medical improv. A podcast covered fundamentals of medical improv and a follow-up focused on signposting. A separate three-part video series dealt with preparing for and responding to disruptive patient encounters.

Her work outside the stage included workplace communication. In 2022, she was the keynote speaker for the Brownwood Area Chamber of Commerce's fourth annual Professional Women's Summit. The University of Texas at Austin identified her in 2025 as a professor of improvisation at St. Edward's University and an associate at UT's Center for Health Communication.

Merlin serves as director of training at the nonprofit Research Theory. There, she helped develop the Scientific Odyssey, a five-part program using improvisational-theatre exercises to encourage creativity among scientists.
