= State Theatre (Austin, Texas) =

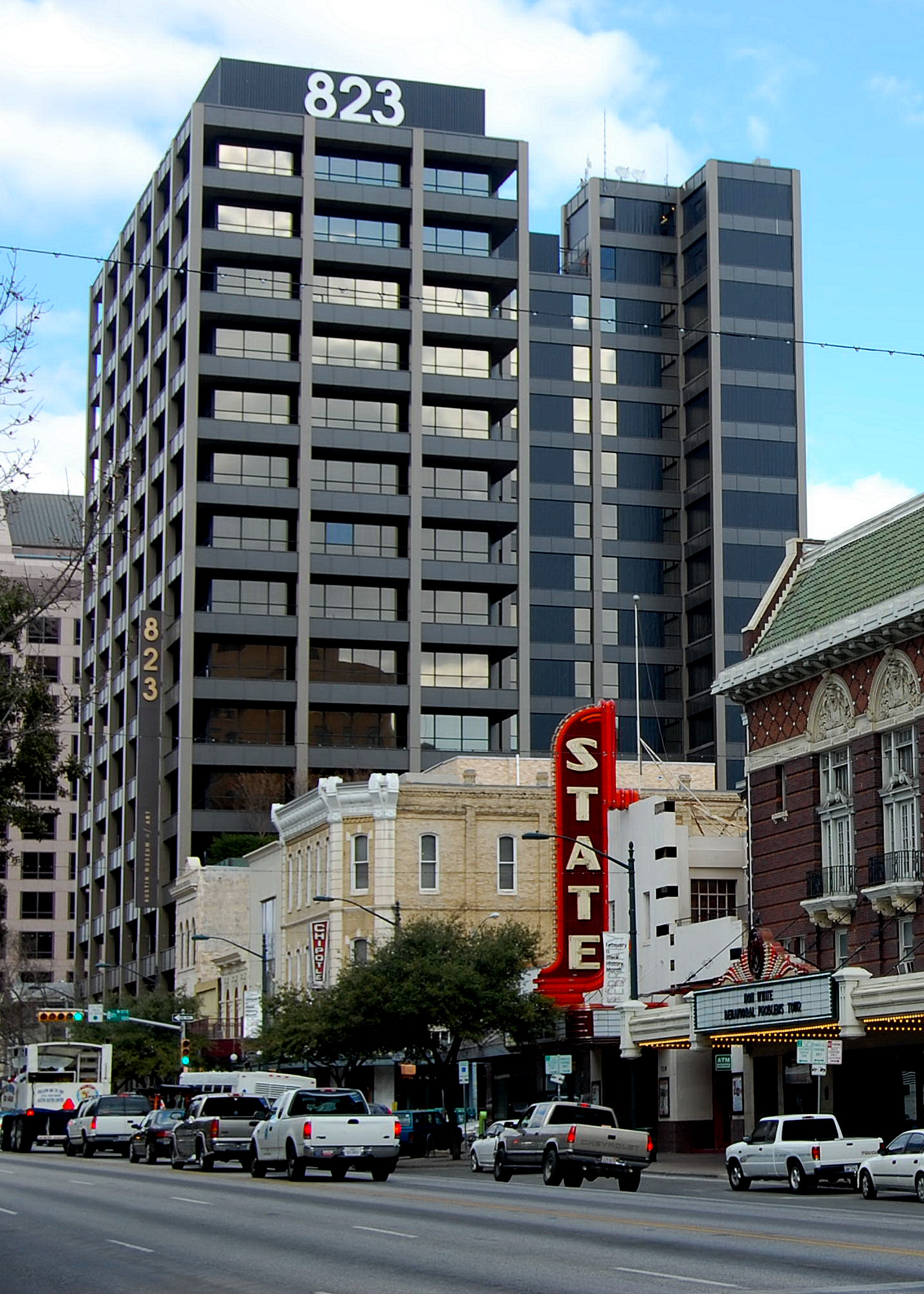
- 823 Congress and the State Theatre in 2009
- Interactive map of State Theatre
- Address: 719 Congress Avenue; Austin, Texas; United States
- Coordinates: 30.2695°N 97.7418°W
- Owner: Austin Theatre Alliance
- Operator: Austin Theatre Alliance
- Type: Theatre

Construction
- Opened: 1935

Website
- www.austintheatre.org

The State Theatre is a theatre at 719 Congress Avenue in downtown Austin, Texas, next door to the Paramount Theatre. Opened in 1935 as a movie house, it is also a venue for films, live performances, and comedy. It is owned by the Austin Theatre Alliance.

== History ==
The Interstate Theaters chain built the State in 1935, alongside the Paramount Theatre, which opened as the Majestic. Over time, both theatres deteriorated and demolition was considered by the 1970s. The State's audience increasingly diminished, despite low ticket prices.

In 2000, the Austin Theatre Alliance formed to manage the two theatres and later purchased both buildings.

== Programming and use ==
The State has hosted films, theater productions, and comedy alongside the larger Paramount. It was one of the venues for the third Big Stinkin' International Improv & Sketch Comedy Festival, with improv and sketch showcases.

The Austin Theatre Alliance presents hundreds of shows each year between the two theatres. Its work includes educational programs reaching more than 30,000 students in Central Texas, the Moontower Comedy Festival, and is a venue for the Austin Film Festival and SXSW Film & TV Festival.

When the Paramount closed for restoration, the State became one of the venues for its Summer Classic Film Series.

== Restoration and renovation ==
In 2025, the Austin Theatre Alliance launched a $65 million campaign for both theatres, $55 million allocated to design and construction, and $10 million to an endowment.

The Paramount closed for restoration in June 2026. Unlike the older theatre next door, the work on the State involves rebuilding much of its interior while keeping the historic Art Deco façade.

The new auditorium is designed to accommodate up to 500 people. The façade and marquee will receive improvements as well.
