= Avery Schreiber =

American actor and comedian (1935–2002)

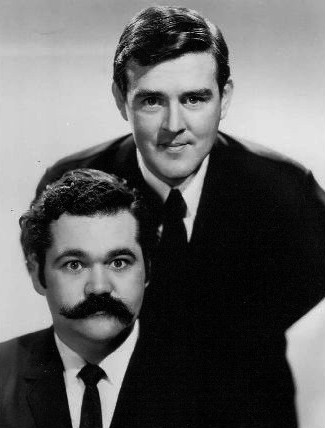
- Schreiber (left) with Jack Burns in 1966
- Born: Avery Lawrence Schreiber; April 9, 1935; Chicago, Illinois, U.S.
- Died: January 7, 2002 (aged 66); Los Angeles, California, U.S.
- Occupations: Actor, comedian
- Years active: 1964–2001
- Spouse: Rochelle Isaacs (m. 1962)
- Children: 2

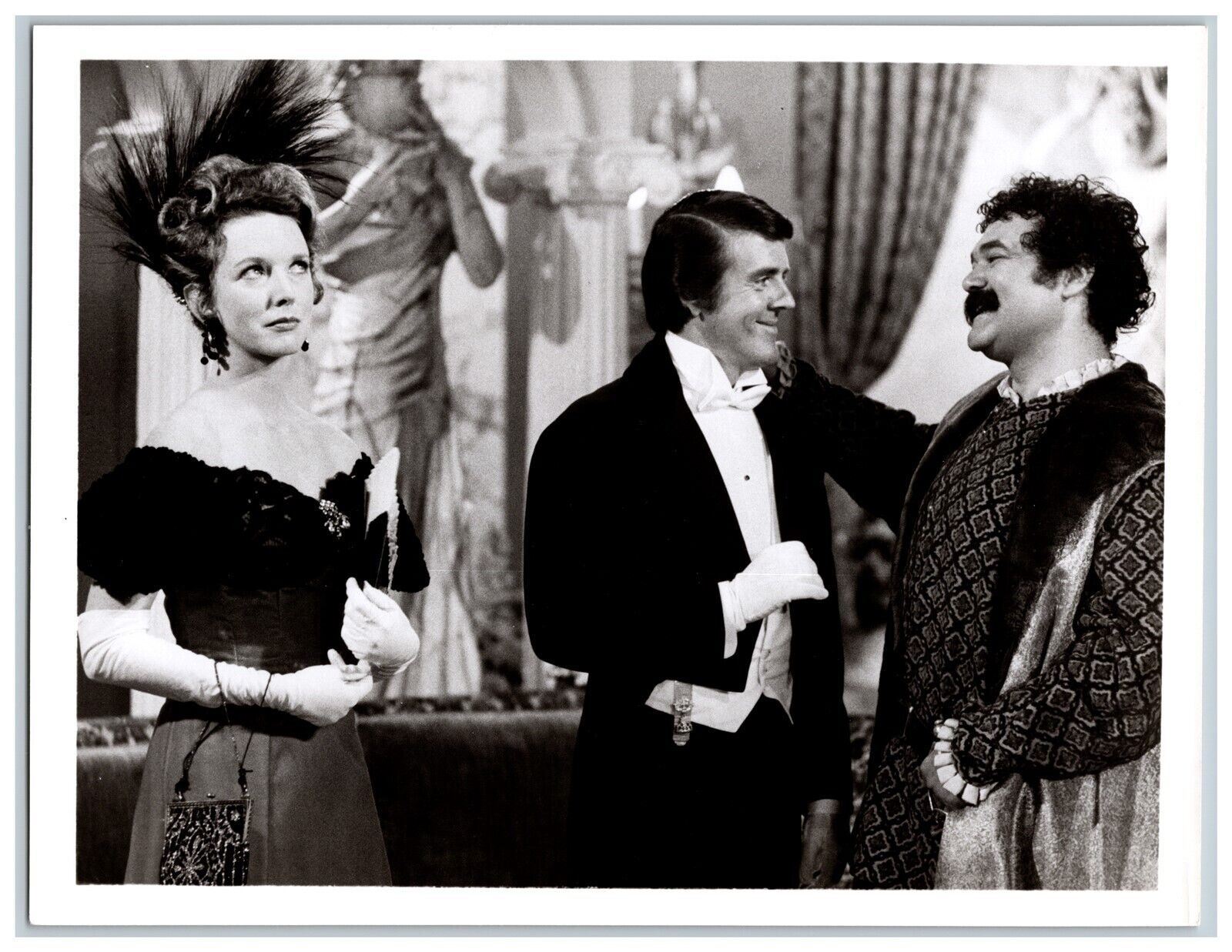
Barbara Babcock (left) with Schreiber (right) and Jack Burns in Love, American Style (1973)

Avery Lawrence Schreiber (April 9, 1935 – January 7, 2002) was an American actor and comedian. He was a veteran of stage, television, and movies who came to prominence in the 1960s in a comedy duo with Jack Burns. He acted in an array of roles mostly on television sitcoms and a series of popular advertisements for Doritos tortilla chips.

== Life and career ==
Schreiber was born in Chicago, Illinois, the son of Minnie (née Shear) and George Schreiber. He started his career in Chicago at the Goodman Theatre. He joined The Second City and later teamed with Jack Burns to form the comedy team of Burns and Schreiber. They recorded several comedy albums and appeared on numerous television shows. Schreiber was Jewish.

Schreiber is remembered for his many Doritos commercials during the 1970s and 1980s, as well as his appearances on several television series. He was known for his trademark bushy handlebar moustache, curly hair, and comedic reactions.

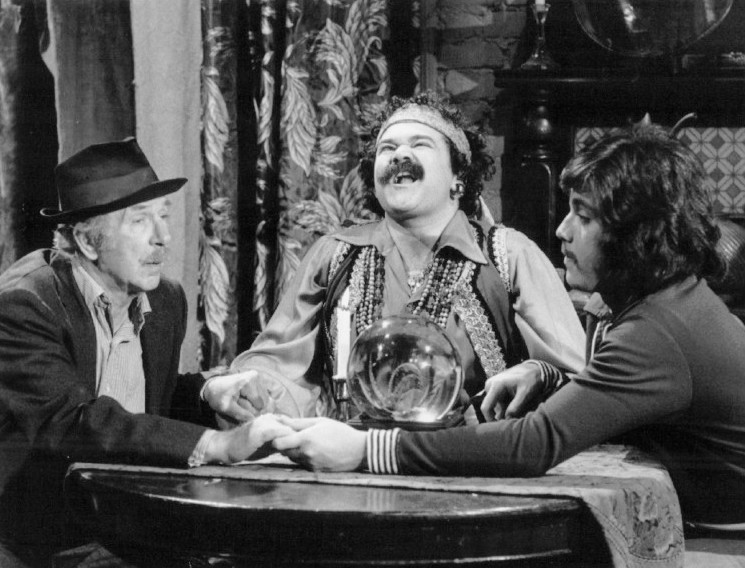
Jack Albertson, Avery Schreiber, and Freddie Prinze on Chico and the Man (1975)

In 1965, Schreiber played the role of Captain Manzini on My Mother the Car. In the summer of 1973, he co-hosted the ABC comedy The Burns and Schreiber Comedy Hour. He was a regular guest star on the situation comedy Chico and the Man, and was also a frequent guest panelist on the game show Match Game, and a guest in a first-season episode of The Muppet Show (written by former partner Jack Burns, whom he mentioned during a stand-up routine in the episode). In addition, he participated in the 1980 Tournament of Celebrities on the Jim Perry-hosted version of Card Sharks. He appeared on The Love Boat S8 E13 as Patrick Turney in a Christmas-themed vignette "Santa, Santa, Santa" which aired on December 15, 1984.

His movie appearances include The Monitors (the first film production of Chicago's Second City comedy troupe, 1969), Don't Drink the Water (1969), Deadhead Miles (1972), Swashbuckler (1976), The Last Remake of Beau Geste (1977), The Concorde... Airport '79, Silent Scream (1979), Scavenger Hunt (1979), Caveman (1981), Jimmy the Kid (1983) and Robin Hood: Men in Tights (1993).

Avery continued to work in film, television and theater, as well as teaching improvisational theater technique up until the time of his death. He taught master classes at The Second City in Chicago and Los Angeles.

He and his wife Rochelle had two children.

== Death ==
In 1994, Schreiber suffered a heart attack resulting from complications of diabetes. Although he survived triple coronary artery bypass surgery, he never fully recovered. He died of another heart attack on January 7, 2002, at Cedars-Sinai Medical Center.

== Legacy ==
In 2003, the Avery Schreiber Theatre was founded in North Hollywood, California. In 2013, the Avery Schreiber Theatre changed its name to The Avery Schreiber Playhouse with the approval of Rochelle Isaacs Schreiber (née Shelley), Avery's widow. It is located at 4934 Lankershim Boulevard in the NoHo Arts District.

== Filmography ==
=== Features ===
Year	Title	Role	Notes
1969	The Monitors	Max Jordan	
1969	Don't Drink the Water	The Sultan	
1972	Deadhead Miles	Boss Fulano	
1976	Swashbuckler	Pulaski	
1977	The Last Remake of Beau Geste	Arab Chieftain / Used Camel Salesman	
1978	Loose Shoes	Theatre Manager	
1978	Christmas at Walt Disney World	Geppetto	
1979	The Concorde... Airport '79	Russian coach Markov	
1979	Silent Scream	Sgt. Manny Ruggin	
1979	Scavenger Hunt	Zookeeper	
1980	Steve Martin: All Commercials		
1980	Galaxina	Captain Cornelius Butt	
1981	Caveman	Ock	
1983	Jimmy the Kid	Dr. Stevens	
1984	Cannonball Run II		Uncredited
1987	Hunk	Constatine Constapopolis	
1988	Saturday the 14th Strikes Back	Frank Baxter	
1993	Robin Hood: Men in Tights	Tax Assessor	
1995	Dracula: Dead and Loving It	Peasant on Coach	
1997	The Lay of the Land	Dean Bill Whittier	
1998	The Russian Room	Old Russian Man	Short
2000	Rebel Yell	Granddaddy of Punk	
2000	Pedestrian		
2001	Dying on the Edge	Saul	

=== Television ===
Year	Title	Role	Notes
1964	East Side/West Side	Truck Driver	
1964	Vacation Playhouse		
1965-1966	My Mother the Car	Captain Bernard Manzini	11 episodes
1967	Our Place		
1968	Premiere	Spivak	
1968	Get Smart	Oleg	
1969	The Mothers-in-Law	Mr.Crawford	
1969-1973	Love, American Style		Season 1, Episode 7: Love and the Advice-Givers
1969	The Ghost and Mrs. Muir	Fire Commissioner Lilly	Season 2, Episode 10: The Firehouse Five Plus Ghost
1969-1970	That Girl	Al Taylor	Season 4, Episodes 1 and 2: Mission Improbable, Part 1 and Part 2
1970	The Doris Day Show	Warren Coleman	
1971	Story Theatre		
1971	Escape	Nicholas Slye	ABC Movie of the Week
1972	McCloud	Milton	
1972	Second Chance	Roberto Gazzari	ABC Movie of the Week
1973	The Burns and Schreiber Comedy Hour	Host	Unknown episodes
1974	The Harlem Globetrotters Popcorn Machine	Mr. Evil	Saturday Morning Variety Series
1975	Ben Vereen... Comin' at Ya	Regular Performer	Unknown episodes
1975	Chico and the Man	Gypsy / Fortune Teller	2 episodes
1975	Sammy and Company	Himself	3 episodes
1976	The Muppet Show	Himself	
1976	The Rockford Files	Azie Boyajian	Episode: Rattlers' Class of '63
1976	Monster Squad	The Weatherman	Episode: The Weatherman
1977	Sha Na Na	Himself	
1977	Don't Push, I'll Charge When I'm Ready	Announcer	TV movie
1978	The Love Boat	Everett Buell	Season 2, Episode 1 & 2
1979	The Dukes of Hazzard	Wendel	Episode 1:13 - Double Sting
1979	Flatbed Annie & Sweetiepie: Lady Truckers	Munroe	TV movie
1980	Avery Schreiber Live From the Second City	Himself	TV movie
1980	More Wild Wild West	Russian Ambassador	TV movie
1982	Fantasy Island	Ed Turner	
1984	The Fall Guy	Truck Driver	(Episode 4:1 - Losers Weepers)
1984	Faerie Tale Theatre Pinocchio	Boatman	
1985	The Pound Puppies	Tubbs	Voice, TV movie
1985	Shadow Chasers	Jordan Kerner	
1985-1987	The Smurfs	Additional Voices	2 episodes
1986	Outlaws	Halifax	
1987	Top Cat and the Beverly Hills Cats	Benny the Ball	Voice, TV movie
1988	A Pup Named Scooby-Doo	Additional Voices	13 episodes
1989	Saved by the Bell	Dr. Mertz	
1990	Wake, Rattle & Roll	Dr. Lester T. Quirk	Voice, TV Series, Unknown episodes
1992	Days of Our Lives	Leopold Alamain	
1993-1995	Animaniacs	Beanie the Brain-Dead Bison	Voice, 3 episodes
1999	Becker	Man Outside Reggie's Diner	
