= Big Stinkin' International Improv & Sketch Comedy Festival =

- Status: Defunct
- Genre: Improvisational theatre, sketch comedy
- Date: 1996–1999
- Frequency: Annual
- Locations: Austin, Texas, U.S.
- Years active: 4
- Founders: Members of Monks' Night Out

Big Stinkin' International Improv Festival, later known as the Big Stinkin' International Improv & Sketch Comedy Festival, ran annually in Austin, Texas, from 1996 to 1999. Marc Pruter and Jon Wiley created the festival, which was hosted by the Austin alternative comedy troupe Monks' Night Out.

It was a large multi-venue event featuring improv and sketch troupes, national television performers, workshops, gala shows, and video screenings.

== History ==
Pruter conceived the festival after becoming discouraged by the absence of a showcase for rising improvisational talent. He brought the idea to fellow Monks' Night Out member Jon Wiley, who promoted it through Usenet and the Web. It took eight months to organize. To prepare, the troupe toured and performed at regional festivals, where they encountered performers and teachers later invited to Austin.

The festival’s founding vision treated cross-pollination among different schools of improv, with direct access to veteran teachers, as an important part of the festival equal to performances. It allowed performers with different approaches into the same event, opportunities to study with notable teachers. Most workshops were available only to festival participants.

=== 1996 ===
==== Performances and programming ====
At the inaugural festival, 20 improv and sketch troupes performed over five nights. Participating groups included Dad's Garage and Theatre Strike Force.

On the first day, troupes checked in and registered for classes at Esther's Pool before attending the opening-night at The Velveeta Room. Second City historian Jeffrey Sweet presented the early history of improvisation, including rare video of early performers. The daily festival rhythm was a day of classes followed by a night of shows, with karaoke afterward.

Talent scouts from Disney, Comedy Central, and Trimark attended the inaugural festival.

==== Workshops ====
The workshop schedule allowed performers to take classes twice a day. Teachers included Gary Austin, Mick Napier, Del Close, Phyllis Katz, Larry Moss, and George Younts. David Koechner and Adam McKay, from Saturday Night Live, taught workshops and emceed festival shows.

==== Venues ====
Festival performances and workshops were at The Velveeta Room, Esther's Pool, Paramount Theatre, and Zachary Scott Theatre.

=== 1997 ===
==== Performances and programming ====
The State headlined the festival with a full-length live show. Second City and Monteith and Rand performed alongside Mumblypeg, Screw Puppies, Fools Play, Transactors, Recess, and MISSION IMPROVable.

BS2 was co-hosted that year by Monks' Night Out and the University of Texas student improv group Only 90% Effective. Attendance grew from about 100 at the first festival to at least 275 at BS2. Representatives from HBO, MTV, CBS, NBC, Fox, VH1, and Comedy Central were expected in Austin. A MADtv casting agent saw Alex Borstein perform with Los Angeles–based ACME Comedy Theatre at Big Stinkin', leading to auditions for the show.

==== Workshops ====
Joe Bill, James Bailey, Paul Sills, Michael Gellman, Martin de Maat, John Monteith, Suzanne Rand, and Amy Poehler taught workshops.

==== Venues ====
BS2 used Borders Books & Music, the Electric Lounge, Esther's Pool, the Paramount Theatre, and The Velveeta Room for performances and workshops.

=== 1998 ===
BS3 ran from April 19 to 25. Monks' Night Out member Ed Carter bought a controlling interest in the festival and added an office staff of ten to handle work previously managed by founders Pruter and Wiley. 13 venues were used to accommodate 55 performances. That year, CNN's April 18 almanac listed the festival among upcoming events.

After the success of Alex Borstein, many performers came to Austin for a chance to be seen by casting agents and producers. The growing pool of performers drew industry representatives, audiences, and sponsors. Comedy Central, HBO, NBC, the William Morris Agency, and Carsey-Werner attended.

Fred Willard, Alex Borstein, Ana Gasteyer, Chris Kattan, and Ron Livingston emceed shows. At the Dougherty Arts Center, Willard appeared with Houseful of Honkeys in one of BS3's standout performances. The Impromptones—Jeff Davis, Joe Whyte, James Thomas Bailey, and Michael Pollock received a standing ovation from fellow performers for their musical improv. Comedy Central, Nickelodeon, and Time Warner Cable were sponsors.

Rudy Moreno hosted a show that featured five Latino comedy acts from San Antonio, Austin, and Los Angeles: Yerba Buena, Big, Bad, and Beautiful, Flojo Style, the Latino Comedy Project, and Pocho!. Yerba Buena's Big Stinkin' appearance earned the troupe its first review, praising its humor without reliance on Latino stereotypes.

Nickelodeon presented an animation showcase featuring SpongeBob SquarePants, CatDog, and Action League Now!. Lori Beth Denberg was a special guest.

==== Workshops ====
Teachers included Keith Johnstone, Carlo Mazzone-Clementi, Cynthia Szigeti, Mark Sutton, and Dan O'Connor.

==== Venues ====
Festival events took place at Esther's Pool, The Velveeta Room, the State Theatre, Palmer Auditorium, the Zachary Scott Theatre Center, the Ritz Upstairs, the Dougherty Arts Center, the Scottish Rite Theatre, Ruta Maya Coffeehouse, the Austin Community College Main Theatre, the Continental Club, the Santa Cruz Center for Culture, and the Electric Lounge.

=== 1999 ===
==== Performances and programming ====
BS4, the fourth and final festival, featured over 50 comedy troupes. They included ACME Comedy Theatre, Naked Babies, Oui Be Negroes, and the Flying Fannoli Brothers. A Whose Line Is It Anyway? show featured Wayne Brady, Ian Gomez, Brad Sherwood, and Denny Siegel.

Other gala performances included a Latino Comedy Showcase and a MADtv cast show.

Mayor Kirk Watson opened the festival with King of the Hill Day, which included a screening and Q&A with series creators Mike Judge and Greg Daniels.

==== Workshops ====
Teachers included Fred Kaz, Gary Austin, Charna Halpern, Wayne Brady, and Joel Murray. There was also a youth workshop and showcase.

==== Venues ====
Festival performances, workshops, and other events were held at Austin Music Hall, Austin Theatresports, Babe's Stage Side, Capitol City Comedy Club, Caucus Club, Dobie Theatre, Esther's Pool, John Henry Faulk Living Theatre, Hyde Park Theatre, Iron Cactus, Maggie Mae's, Miguel's La Bodega, the Paramount Theatre, Scottish Rite Theatre, Speakeasy, the Velveeta Room, and Zachary Scott Theatre.

==== Panels ====
Weekday morning panels at Esther's Pool included subjects on writing professionally, the business of comedy, bilingual comedy, approaches to improvisation, and technology. Participants included Johnny Hardwick; Jay Kogen; Liz Carpenter; Fred Kaz; and Dan O'Connor.

== Scale and programming ==
In The Comedy Bible, Judy Carter described Big Stinkin' as "the largest annual improv and sketch comedy festival of its kind". Contemporary coverage of the 1999 festival described Big Stinkin' as the continent's third-largest comedy festival, behind Aspen and Montreal.

For BS4, the festival moved to juried invitations, in order to improve quality. The international lineup included The Improv Bandits from Auckland, New Zealand and the Japanese troupe Galacta Excite. Spoo's appearance at BS4 also connected the festival to Del Close's final work; Close had been directing the group's show Underlined Passages at the time of his death. Members of Spoo also presented Galacta Excite with the Del Close "So You Think You're Funny" Award.

The festival had grown to nearly 60 separate shows, including six gala shows at the Paramount Theatre, and had secured sponsorship from Comedy Central, Jose Cuervo, RC Cola, and Time Warner Cable. Big Stinkin' at its peak showcased more than 50 comedy troupes and featured guests such as Fred Willard, Stephen Root, Wayne Brady, Chris Kattan, Ana Gasteyer, Alex Borstein, Will Sasso, Michael McDonald, Mo Collins, Phil LaMarr, and Nicole Sullivan.

== Closure and legacy ==
Plans for a fifth festival in 2000 did not materialize. Carter, who served as the sole financier, took a major financial loss on the last festival.

The Austin American-Statesman described the festival as a career opportunity for local and visiting performers, citing Derek Jeremiah Reid's Fox Family Channel hosting job after being spotted at the previous year's festival, as well as industry-related opportunities involving Monks' Night Out, Matt Bearden, and Only 90% Effective. Kinna McInroe met Groundlings founder Gary Austin at Big Stinkin', when she received a callback for Office Space. She later worked as Austin's assistant.

Later coverage has treated Big Stinkin' as an important precursor in Austin improv and sketch comedy history, particularly in the development of Austin comedy festivals. The Austin Chronicle called it the "granpappy" of later comedy festivals in Austin and called its collapse the turning point before other local festivals emerged in later years.

Chicago Improv Festival founder Jonathan Pitts said that when the Chicago festival was founded in 1998, Big Stinkin' and the Kansas City Improv Festival were the two major improv festivals active at the time, describing Big Stinkin' as "the kings of the hill."

In the book Guru: My Days with Del Close, author Jeff Griggs described Big Stinkin' as "the biggest of the bunch" among festivals that developed around visits by Chicago improv teachers, writing that it attracted hundreds of performers and teachers and became popular with casting agents and producers seeking new talent. It has also been described in later media coverage as the first major improv festival in the United States.

== See also ==
- Out of Bounds Comedy Festival
