= Dougherty Arts Center =

Arts center in Austin, Texas

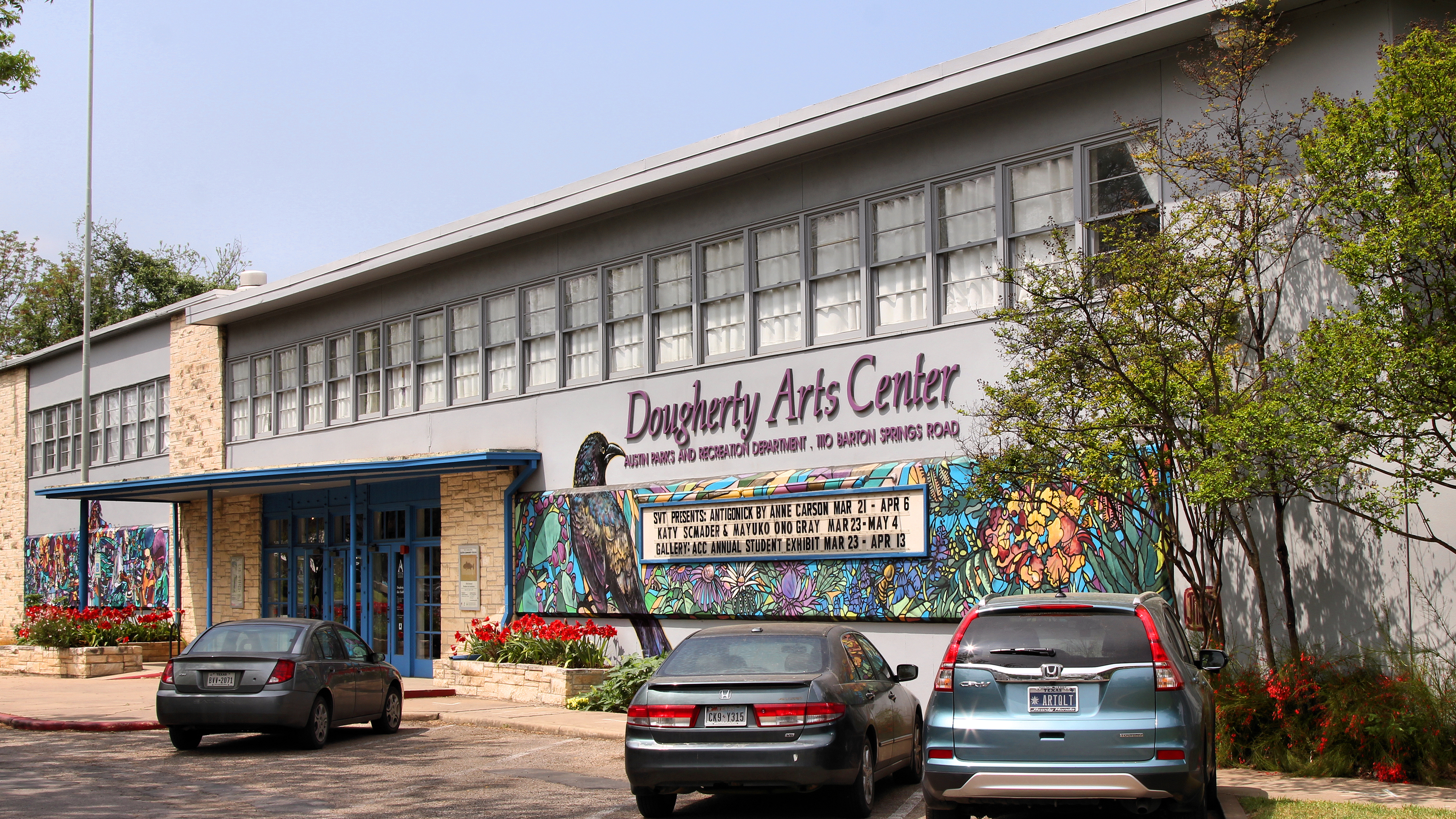
- Dougherty Arts Center in 2019
- Interactive map of Dougherty Arts Center
- Address: 1110 Barton Springs Road; Austin, Texas; United States
- Coordinates: 30°15′39″N 97°45′22″W
- Capacity: 150-seat theater
- Type: Performing and visual arts center

Construction
- Opened: 1978

Website
- www.austintexas.gov/dougherty

Dougherty Arts Center is a performing and visual arts center in Austin, Texas. Operated as part of the City of Austin's arts and parks programming, the center includes a theater, gallery, arts school, studio arts programs, artist development programs, and community event space.

== History ==
The building that houses the Dougherty Arts Center was originally constructed in the late 1940s as a U.S. Navy and Marine Corps reserve facility. According to the City of Austin, the building was built in 1947 as a Naval and Marine Reserve Center. It was given to the city in 1978 and named for arts advocate Mary Ireland Graves Dougherty. The city describes the center as Austin's oldest community arts venue, offering theater, music and dance performances, art exhibits, events, and studio arts programs for youth and adults.

The center's main components include the Dougherty Theater, the Julia C. Butridge Gallery, the Dougherty Arts School, and artist professional development programs. The Julia C. Butridge Gallery includes 2,000 square feet of main gallery space and an additional 480 square feet of renovated gallery space, and is free and open to the public.

== Facilities and programming ==
The Dougherty Arts Center has hosted local, national, and international performing artists since 1978. Its theater is a 150-seat proscenium theater with lighting and sound systems, dressing rooms, a green room, a loading dock, and flexible seating configurations. The center also offers two 450-square-foot community creative spaces for arts organizations during business hours.

The Dougherty Arts School provides arts education for children, teens, and adults, including studio classes, youth programs, and teen professional development. The center's public programming includes theater performances, gallery openings, workshops, community events, digital programming, and community arts services.

In 1998, the Dougherty Arts Center was one of the venues used by the Big Stinkin' International Improv & Sketch Comedy Festival. The Austin Chronicle reported that the third edition of the festival included a late Saturday night showcase at the center featuring Oui Be Negroes and Houseful of Honkeys as part of Fred Willard's festival appearances.

In 2017, the center had about 66,000 visitors, hosted 596 performances, gallery events, arts classes and other programs, and served 4,693 artists. Later programming has included Art-O-Rama, a free annual event featuring art installations and hands-on activities, and Julia C. Butridge Gallery exhibitions such as "Connecting Threads", a 2025–2026 Austin Modern Quilt Guild show featuring 28 quilts about memory, community, and personal storytelling.

== Redevelopment project ==
A 2010 conditions assessment found that the existing Dougherty Arts Center building was beyond repair and had originally been intended as a temporary structure.

In 2018, Austin voters approved bond funding for a replacement facility, and the city held a community engagement process for the redevelopment project. In December of that year, the Austin American-Statesman reported that rain damage to the existing building's roof had exposed parts of the facility to water damage and raised questions about the future of the Barton Springs Road site.

In May 2019, the Austin American-Statesman reported that Austin Parks and Recreation Department staff had proposed moving the center to Butler Shores Park, citing the building's condition and its location within a 25-year flood plain. The proposal called for a new 40,000-square-foot facility and a 200-space parking garage, and three city advisory boards had recommended approval. The project later followed City Council direction in 2019.

The replacement project is intended to continue the center's arts programming in a new facility at Butler Shores Park. Project goals include developing surrounding parkland, improving trail connections, adding outdoor education and performance amenities, and incorporating sustainable design.
