= Amleto Sartori =

Italian sculptor and poet

Amleto Sartori (3 November 1915 – 18 February 1962) was an Italian sculptor and poet from Padua most famous for his theater masks.

First a sculptor, after the Second World War, Sartori began to fervently study the masks of Commedia dell'Arte which led him to a technique of modeling leather masks on wooden molds. His mask making techniques became famous, and his son Donato (1939 - 2016) later continued the work.

Sartori became friends with Jacques Lecoq, who introduced him to the Piccolo Teatro in Milan, where he met Giorgio Strehler and Paolo Grassi. This was a turning point in Sartori's career, and brought him into contact with other artists such as Ferruccio Soleri and Marcello Moretti for the construction of masks for their theater productions.

In 1979 his son Donato Sartori founded the Centro maschere e strutture gestuali in Padua, while in 2004, after his death, the International Museum of the Masks of Amleto and Donato Sartori (Museo Internazionale della Maschera Amleto e Donato Sartori) was founded in Abano Terme.
