= The Velveeta Room =

Comedy club in Austin, Texas

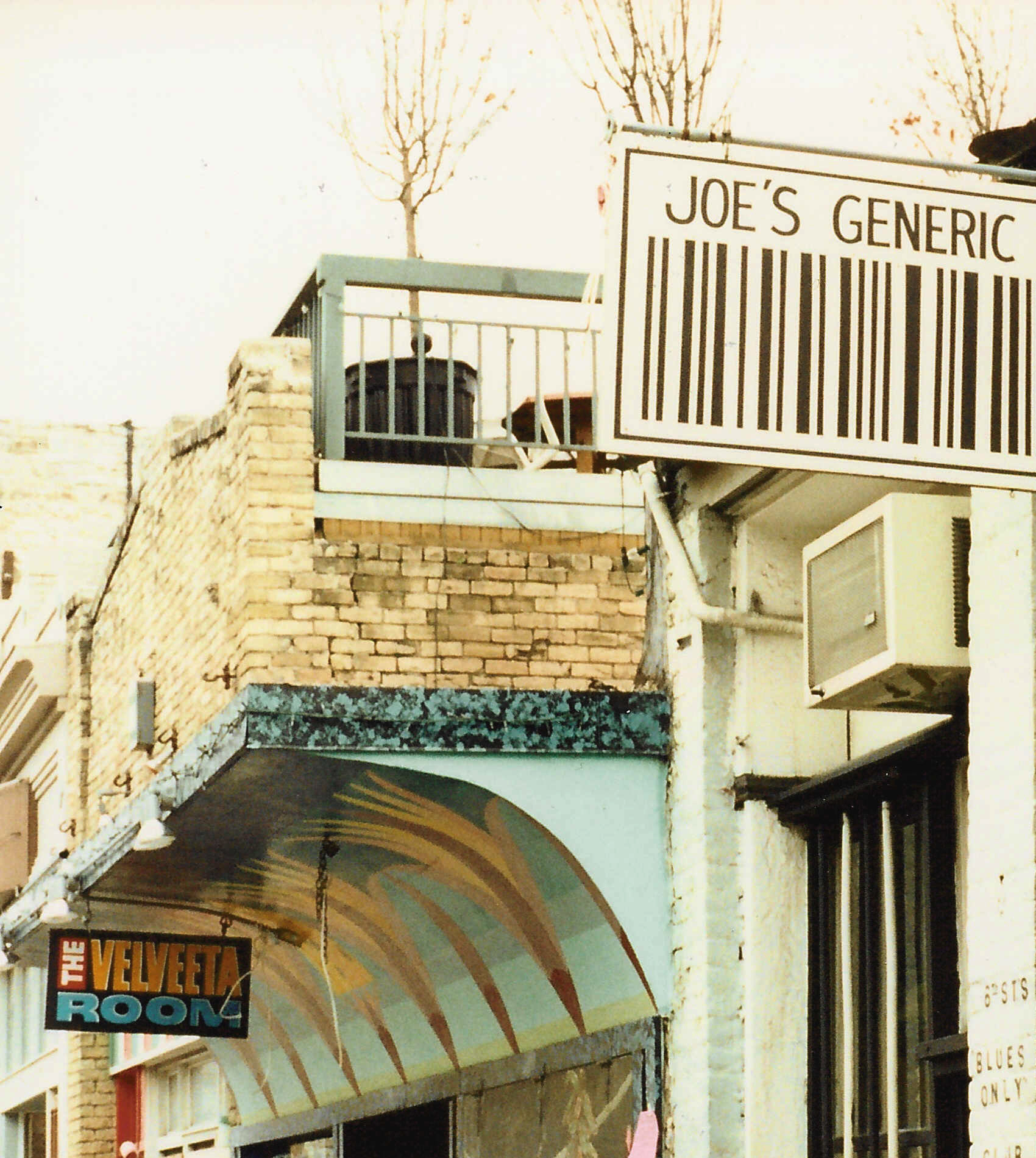
The Velveeta Room, visible at left beside Joe's Generic Bar, on Sixth Street in Austin, 1993.

The Velveeta Room is a comedy club in Austin, Texas. The venue has been described as a long-running fixture of Austin's comedy scene and a development space for local comedians.

== History ==
In 1988, Esther's Follies owners Shannon Sedwick and Michael Shelton, took over the lease of the former Embassy Room, a Sixth Street strip club.

They opened the club to give members of the Esther's cast a place to pursue stand-up comedy. The stage still retained the stripper pole. At the time, there were few stand-up comics, so the early programming included a variety of different acts, including bands, sketch comedy, musical comedy, improv, as well as stand-up. Named after Ronnie Velveeta, a lounge-lizard character created by comic and artist Kerry Awn, he described the early room as "Esther's private little clubhouse".

The Velveeta Room later moved to 521 East Sixth Street, adjacent to Esther's Follies, from the Sun Theater. After three decades of performances, the club has gone through a relocation, redesign, changes in management, while keeping its focus on newer performers. It is commonly referred to as "The Velv".

== Role in Austin comedy ==
Stand-up remains central to the room, but improv and sketch comedy were also part of its history. Open-mic nights give newer comics stage time, and the club used the tagline "Where Comedy Grows". Alternative comedy troupe Monks' Night Out performed there weekly in the 1990s. Hosting the Big Stinkin' International Improv & Sketch Comedy Festival, the club was one of its inaugural venues. Continuing its inclusion of improv and sketch comedy, the Velv was also a venue for the Out of Bounds Comedy Festival.

== See also ==
- Comedy in Austin, Texas
