= Gary Austin =

American improvisational theatre teacher, writer and director (1941–2017)

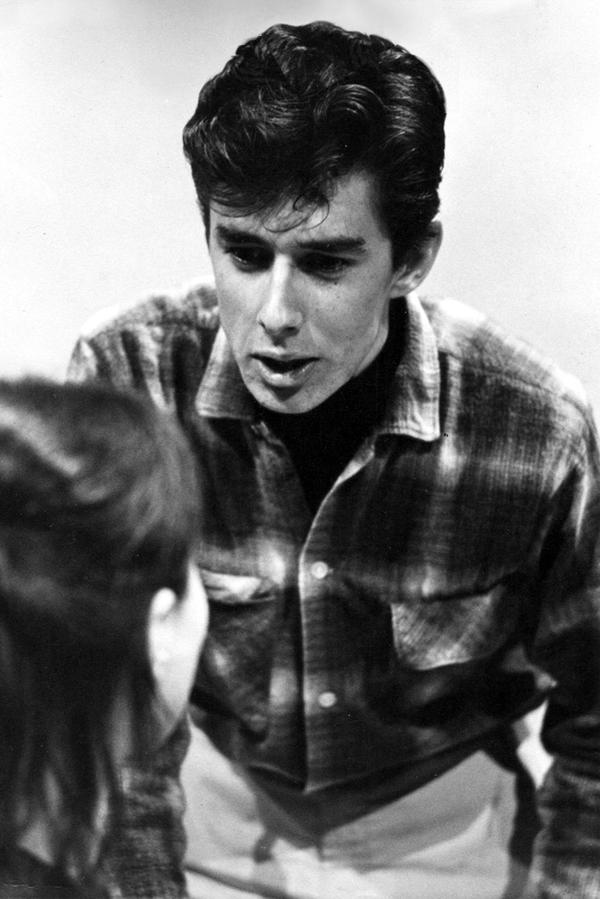
- Austin at San Francisco State University, 1963
- Born: Gary Moore; October 18, 1941; Duncan, Oklahoma, U.S.
- Died: April 1, 2017 (aged 75); Los Angeles, California, U.S.
- Education: San Francisco State University
- Occupations: Theater director, teacher, actor, writer, musician
- Children: Audrey Austin Moore
- Writing career
- Years active: 1962–2017

Gary Austin (born Gary Moore; October 18, 1941 – April 1, 2017) was an American improvisational theatre teacher, writer, and director who founded The Groundlings theatre company in 1974.

== Early life ==
Austin grew up in the Nazarene Church and in Halliburton oil camps in Oklahoma, Texas and California. He graduated from Santa Fe High School in Santa Fe Springs, California, in 1960 and earned his BA in Theatre from San Francisco State University in 1964.

== The Committee ==
After college, Austin moved to Los Angeles where he became a stage manager for the L.A. branch of San Francisco's famed improvisational comedy group, The Committee. It was here Austin worked as an improviser with Second City's Del Close and began to develop characters. When the Los Angeles company closed in 1969, Austin moved to San Francisco where he became a performing member of The Committee.

After his departure from The Committee, Austin moved back to Los Angeles and worked at the newly-opened Comedy Store where he improvised with The Comedy Store Players, worked as emcee, and did stand-up.

In 1972, Gary gathered together a group of actors and started the Gary Austin Workshops. After a year he decided it was time for the actors to perform publicly and he began directing shows in Los Angeles. As word got around about the workshop, the improvisers began to perform at various venues around Hollywood.

== The Groundlings ==
In January 1974, Austin created the non-profit improvisational theatre company, The Groundlings, composed of members of his workshops. The company moved into the Oxford Theatre in East Hollywood. Austin continued as Artistic Director.

A non-profit company requires a name to be agreed to by the charter members. After taking a poll, Gary found that most members wanted the company to be called "The Working Class." The night before the vote, Austin was reading Hamlet's speech to the players "with the intention of using Shakespeare's acting lesson as a jumping off point for the next day's workshop" and came up with the name Groundlings (a reference in the play to the lower class audience members who sat on the ground in front of the stage to watch plays at the Globe Theatre in Shakespeare's day). The next day, Austin presented the name and after much debate, "The Groundlings" won.

During the course of one year at The Oxford the Groundlings became known throughout the Hollywood industry. They performed in a thirty-seat theatre with a cast of twenty-five and the actors often outnumbered the audience. Austin was interviewed by Sylvie Drake, Los Angeles Times theatre critic, one week before the opening show. In her article in the Times the Sunday prior to the Groundling opening she concluded, "This could be the start of something big." She gave the Groundlings the first of many rave reviews.

As the buzz about the new company increased, the entertainment industry began to take notice. Comedian Lily Tomlin was a regular in the audience, as was Lorne Michaels, and several Groundlings were hired to perform on Lily, the 1975 Emmy Award-winning ABC special. Gary was hired to direct portions of the show. Later that year, Lorne Michaels, who produced the Tomlin special, asked Groundling Laraine Newman to be a cast member for his new late night comedy series Saturday Night Live. He asked Gary to move to New York City to direct the cast and Austin declined in order to continue his work with The Groundlings. Before long, membership in the company grew to 90 performers. To keep the size of the company down, auditions became required. (Phil Hartman, who was then a graphic designer and not an actor, attended that first audition. He got in, but because of the stiff competition, it would be over a year before he started performing in the shows).

As the company grew in numbers and popularity, it was time to move into a new theatre. One day while driving home from a workshop, Austin saw a For Rent sign on a building at 7307 Melrose Ave. in West Hollywood and in 1975, the company members rented the empty space and constructed The Groundling Theatre with their own hands. Due to building codes, parking restrictions and problems with contracting, it would take four years for the theatre to open to the public. In the meantime, the Groundlings continued to perform at various Hollywood locations, including The Improv, The White House (home of Kentucky Fried Theatre) and even the Plantation Dinner Theatre in St. Louis. The Groundlings performed on national television on the Merv Griffin Show, on an NBC special and on the then local Regis Philbin Show. In November 1979, Austin stepped down as Artistic Director. He returned in 1990 to direct the show for a while.

== Teaching and workshops ==
After leaving The Groundlings, Austin continued teaching through the Gary Austin Workshops. The Los Angeles Times described him as artistic director of the workshops in Los Angeles, Seattle, and Washington, D.C., and obituaries identified Paul Feig, Lisa Kudrow, Helen Hunt, Jennifer Grey, and Mindy Sterling among his students. The Groundlings' official biography also describes Austin conducting workshops and developing projects in Los Angeles, New York, Seattle, Chicago, and Washington, D.C.

Austin's workshops treated improvisation as a form of actor training as well as performance. Backstage described the Gary Austin Workshops as using improvisation to help actors develop spontaneity, performance skills, characters, and material. In 1997, The Austin Chronicle reported that Austin taught workshops at the Big Stinkin' International Improv & Sketch Comedy Festival in Austin, TX, describing his instruction as emphasizing character development, emotional commitment, radical choices, and the use of personal experience in scene work.

In New York, Austin worked with Artistic New Directions and the Peoples Improv Theater. The Groundlings' biography describes him as a frequent guest instructor at both organizations, as well as at Second City locations in Chicago and New York. AND Theatre Company says Austin came to New York to extend his workshops and later became associated with its summer improvisation retreat program; the company's history lists him among master teachers it sponsored, alongside Jeffrey Sweet, Michael Gellman, Carol Fox Prescott, and others. A University of Georgia faculty curriculum vitae also documents master classes at Artistic New Directions summer improvisation workshops in 2001 and 2002 with Austin, Sweet, Gellman, Carol Fox Prescott, and others.

== Other work ==
Austin wrote two solo shows, "Church" and "Oil," and performed them coast to coast. In 2014, he released his album The Traveler, which featured both songs and storytelling.

His final show at The Groundlings was "Gary Austin in Word and Song" in 2016.

== Death ==
Austin died of cancer in Los Angeles, California, at the age of 75. He was survived by his wife Wenndy MacKenzie and daughter Audrey Moore.

== Quotes ==
Gary Austin will forever be considered one of the greats, always interested in producing work that is funny and moving, because it's true and utterly unique. His work is always a treat to watch.

— Helen Hunt (Actor, writer, producer, director)
