= Chicago Railroad Fair =

Trade show in the United States

- The cover for the Chicago Railroad Fair's 1949 official program
- Date: July 20, 1948 – October 2, 1949
- Venue: Burnham Park
- Location: Chicago, United States
- Theme: Rail transportation in the United States
- Organised by: Chicago and North Western Railway

The Chicago Railroad Fair was an event organized to celebrate and commemorate 100 years of railroad history west of Chicago, Illinois. It was held in Chicago in 1948 and 1949 along the shore of Lake Michigan and is often referred to as "the last great railroad fair" with 39 railroad companies participating. The board of directors for the show was a veritable "Who's Who" of railroad company executives.

== History of the fair ==
The origin of the fair traces back to the Chicago and North Western Railway (CNW), which at the time was the successor of the first railroad to operate out of Chicago, the Galena and Chicago Union Railroad. CNW was seeking a way to commemorate 100 years of railroading in Chicago, especially as it was done on the CNW itself. Public Relations Manager F.V. Koval is credited with developing the idea behind the fair. The CNW advertising and public relation staff went to work to promote the show in the early months of 1948, beginning with a series of photographs made by company photographer Don Lidikay of people in 19th century costumes posing with the locomotive Pioneer, which had pulled the first train out of Chicago in 1848.

The fair was rapidly planned during the winter and spring of 1948, and originally scheduled to run between July and August of that summer. Erected on 50 acres (200,000 m^{2}) of Burnham Park in Chicago between 21st and 31st Streets, the fair opened after only six months of planning. A grand opening for the fair commenced on July 20 with a parade that featured such spectacles as a military marching band and a replica of a troop train, a contingent of cowboys and Native Americans, a replica of the Tom Thumb, the first American locomotive, and the spry, octogenarian widow of Casey Jones, who served as honorary Grand Master of the parade. One dollar was the price of admission, and, except food, all the attractions, displays, exhibits and shows were free. Besides the thirty-nine railroads who participated in the fair, there were more than twenty equipment manufacturers, including General Motors. The Santa Fe also sponsored an Indian Village where Native Americans sold handicrafts, staged dances, and explained the different types of lodging that were on display.

A popular ride for visitors was the Narrow Gauge (3-foot) excursion train which ran the length of the grounds, charged at 10 cents per ride. The train, supplied for the Fair by CB&Q, consisted of refurbished Colorado and Southern Number 9, a 2-6-0 built in 1882, and coaches, open observation cars and a railway post office car which had been built new by CB&Q in 1880's style. The train was lettered for the Deadwood Central Railroad, a defunct railroad in South Dakota. For the 1949 Fair, D&RGW provided a second train, with its own refurbished 2-8-0 number 268 and coaches, all lettered for the fictional "Colorado Springs and Tincup Railroad". The complete "Deadwood Central" train was acquired in 1956 by the Black Hills Central Railroad, but the name was not continued.

A highlight of the fair was the presence of the Freedom Train. The Freedom Train travelled the country from September 17, 1947, through Jan 22, 1949, and was at the Railroad Fair from July 5 – 9. It held many documents and artifacts from the National Archives. Available for public viewing were the original United States Constitution, Declaration of Independence and the Bill of Rights. Security of the documents was the responsibility of the Marine Corps.

The fair was open from July 20, 1948, to October 3, 1948, and June 25, 1949, to October 2, 1949. Attendance during 1948 was 2,500,813 people. In 1949 this attendance record was broken on September 25, 1949, a week before the fair closed. When the fair ended in 1949, a total of 2,732,739 people had attended that year. The highest date of attendance was Sunday, August 1, 1948, when 75,257 passed through the fair gates. It was the first Chicago fair where attendance in the second year exceeded the first year's total.

== Board of directors ==
The officers and board of directors for the fair were mostly prominent railroad executives. The fair's officers were:

- President - Lenox R. Lohr, President Museum of Science and Industry in Chicago
- Vice President - R.L. Williams, President Chicago and North Western Railway
- Treasurer - Wayne A. Johnston, President Illinois Central Railroad
- Secretary - G. M. Campbell, Vice President Baltimore and Ohio Railroad

The fair's directors included (in alphabetical order by surname):

- Arthur K. Atkinson, President Wabash Railroad
- John W. Barriger III, President Monon Railroad
- T. D. Beven, President Elgin, Joliet and Eastern Railroad
- J. J. Brinkworth, Vice President New York Central System
- John M. Budd, Vice President Great Northern Railway
- Ralph Budd, President Burlington Lines
- C. H. Buford, President Chicago, Milwaukee, St. Paul and Pacific Railroad
- G. M. Campbell, Vice President Baltimore and Ohio Railroad
- Thomas J. Deegan, Vice President Chesapeake and Ohio Railway
- William N. Deramus III, President Chicago Great Western Railway
- S. A. Dobbs, Vice President Gulf, Mobile and Ohio Railroad
- J. D. Farrington, President Rock Island Lines
- P. E. Feucht, Vice President Pennsylvania Railroad
- E. S. French, President Boston and Maine Railroad
- Charles J. Graham, President Pittsburgh and West Virginia Railway
- Fred Gurley, President Atchison, Topeka and Santa Fe Railway
- C. R. Harding, President Pullman Company
- Wayne A. Johnston, President Illinois Central Railroad
- J. D. Dodson, President Texas Mexican Railway
- Lenox R. Lohr, President Museum of Science and Industry in Chicago
- Wilson McCarthy, President Denver and Rio Grande Western Railroad
- H. E. McGee, President Green Bay and Western Railroad
- C. M. Roddewig, President Chicago and Eastern Illinois Railroad
- F. L. Schrader, President Chicago and Illinois Midland Railway
- C. A. Skog, Vice President and General Manager Grand Trunk Railway
- A. E. Stoddard, President Union Pacific Railroad
- A. Syverson, Vice President and General Manager Lake Superior and Ishpeming Railroad
- P. H. Van Hoven, President Duluth, Missabe and Iron Range Railway
- R.L. Williams, President Chicago and North Western Railway
- L. L. White, President Nickel Plate Road
- Ward Wire, Vice President Colorado and Wyoming Railway
- R. E. Woodruff, President Erie Railroad

== Participating railroads ==
38 railroads and more than 20 railroad equipment manufacturers participated in the Chicago Railroad Fair exhibiting equipment and interpretive displays around the fair's theme of 100 years of railroad history. The majority of the participating railroads maintained a direct rail connection to Chicago. The companies that participated included:

- Atchison, Topeka and Santa Fe Railway
- Baltimore and Ohio Railroad
- Boston and Maine Railroad
- Burlington Lines
- Chesapeake and Ohio Railway
- Chicago and Eastern Illinois Railroad
- Chicago Great Western Railway
- Chicago and Illinois Midland Railway
- Chicago, Indianapolis and Louisville Railway (Monon Railroad)
- Chicago, Milwaukee, St. Paul and Pacific Railroad (Milwaukee Road)
- Chicago and North Western Railway
- Colorado and Wyoming Railway
- Denver and Rio Grande Western Railroad
- Duluth, Missabe and Iron Range Railway
- Elgin, Joliet and Eastern Railway
- Erie Railroad
- Grand Trunk Railway
- Great Northern Railway
- Green Bay and Western Railroad
- Gulf, Mobile and Ohio Railroad (The Alton Route)
- Illinois Central Railroad
- Lake Superior and Ishpeming Railroad
- Maine Central Railroad
- Minneapolis and St. Louis Railway
- Monongahela Railway
- New York Central Railroad
- Nickel Plate Road
- Norfolk and Western Railway
- Northern Pacific Railway
- Pennsylvania Railroad
- Pittsburgh and West Virginia Railway
- Pullman Company
- Rock Island Lines
- Soo Line Railroad
- Spokane, Portland and Seattle Railway
- Texas Mexican Railway
- Union Pacific Railroad
- Wabash Railroad
- Western Pacific Railroad

== Rolling stock displays ==
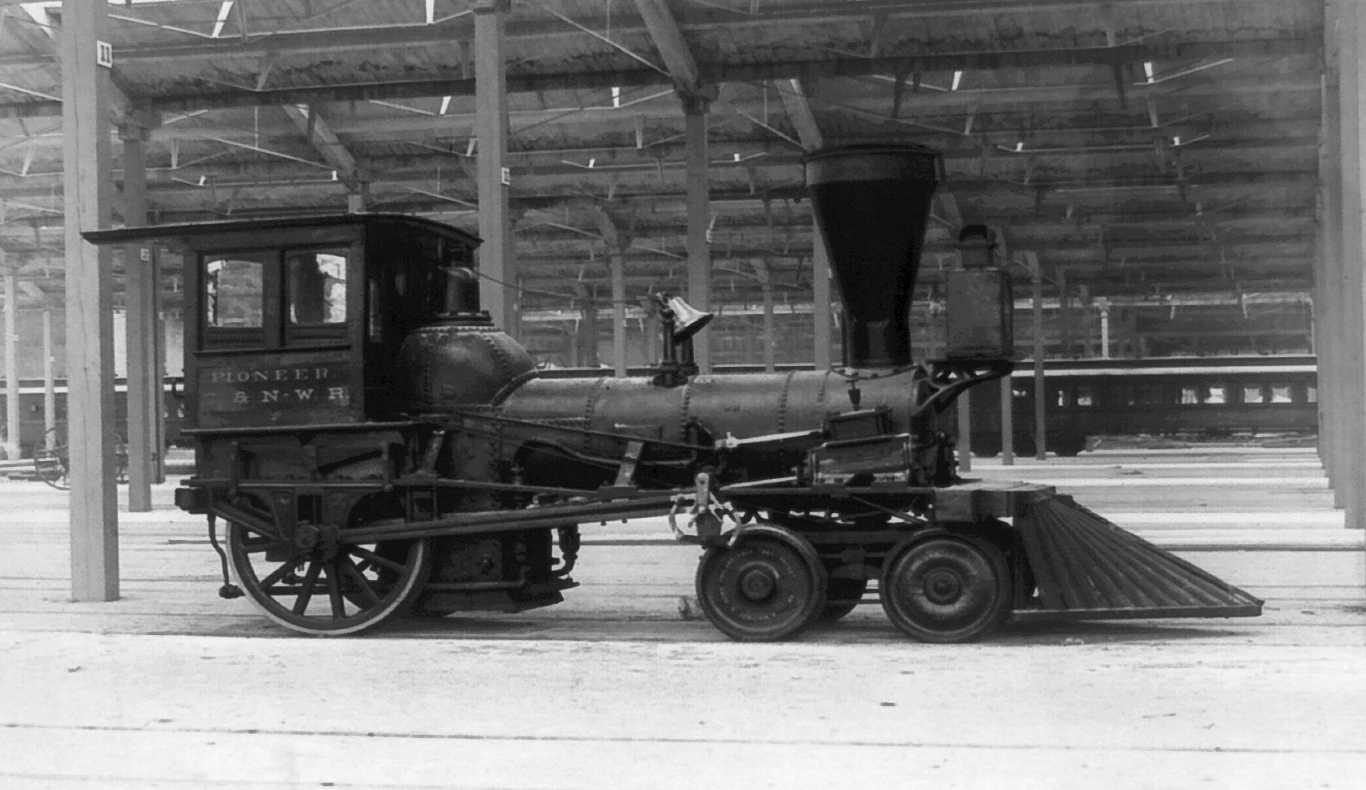
The Pioneer was used in the pageant, and is now preserved at the Chicago History Museum.

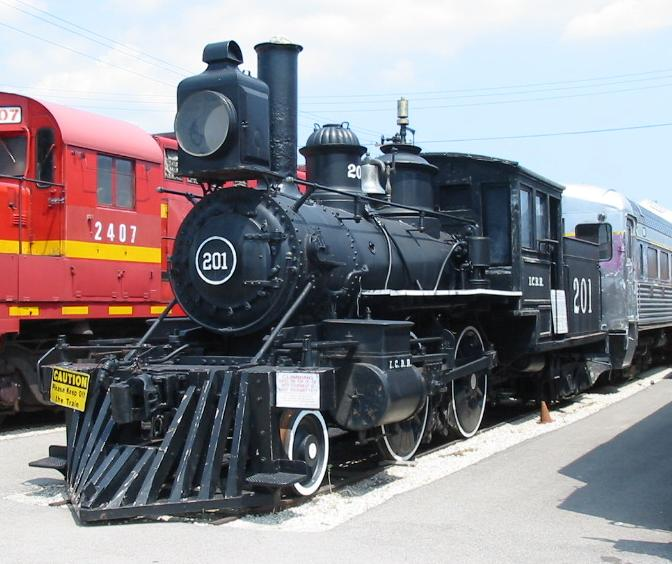
Illinois Central Railroad No. 201, built in 1880 by the Rogers Locomotive and Machine Works, was used in the pageant. This locomotive is now preserved at the Illinois Railway Museum, where this photo was taken.

The highlight of the Chicago Railroad Fair was the "Wheels A-Rolling" pageant. This was a dramatic and musical presentation, written by Edward Hungerford, intended to showcase the development of transportation and the railroads across the country beginning with trails and waterways. The pageant included a recreation of the Golden Spike ceremony at Promontory, Utah, and various historic rolling stock and replicas of equipment in operation.

Railroad equipment used in the pageant included:

=== Original equipment ===
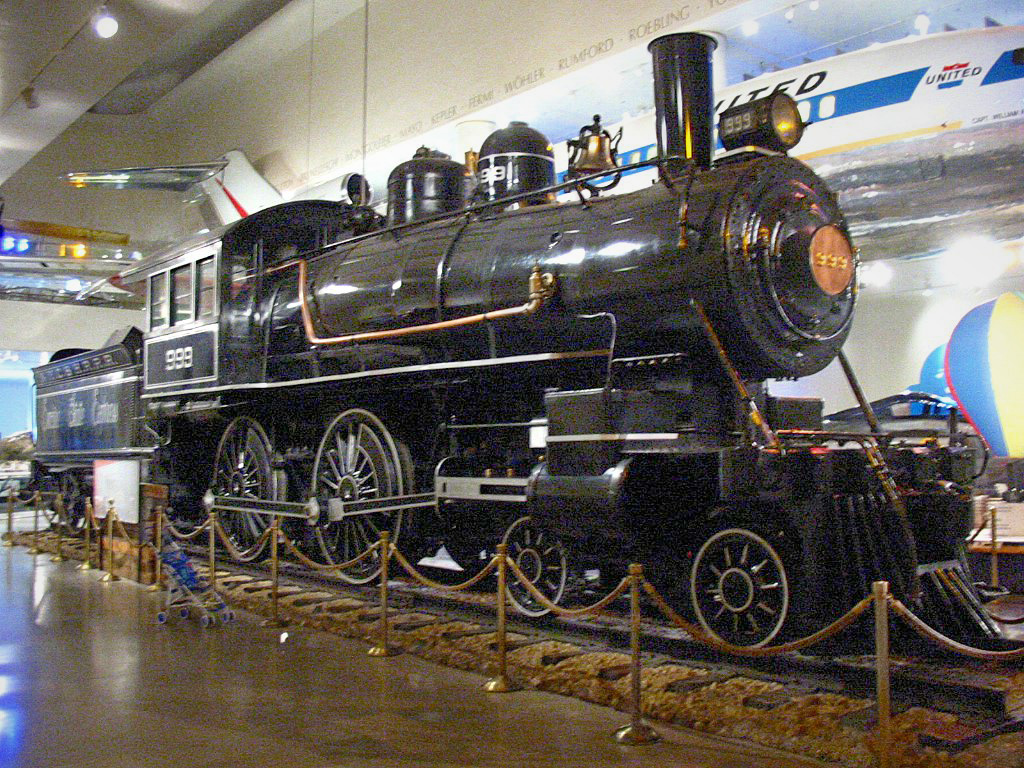
NYC&HR 999 on display at the Museum of Science and Industry in Chicago.

- No. 222 and coach
- No. 637, Zulu and combine car
- No. 10250
- Cumberland Valley Pioneer and coach
- New York Central and Hudson River Railroad No. 999
- The General (1948 only)
- John Hancock and coach
- Illinois Central 201 and coach
- Little Butter Cup and two coaches
- Minnetonka and two logging trucks
- Pioneer and coach
- Pioneer Zephyr
- Reuben Wells and coach
- "Union Pacific Big Boy"
- William Crooks and two coaches
- William Mason and baggage car number 10

=== Replicas ===
- Atlantic and two replica coaches
- Best Friend of Charleston
- Chicago horse car
- DeWitt Clinton and three coaches
- John Bull and coach
- Jupiter (portrayed by Virginia and Truckee Railroad locomotive Genoa and by V&T #22 Inyo) and combine car
- Lafayette and two barrel cars
- Pioneer horse car
- Pullman coach number 9
- State Street cable car
- Tom Thumb locomotive and director's car
- Union Pacific No. 119 (portrayed by V&T #18 Dayton and by Chicago, Burlington, and Quincy locomotive no. 35)

== Legacy ==
In addition to being the last great assembly of railroad equipment and technology by participating railroad companies, the 1948 Chicago Railroad Fair holds a lesser known honor and connection to Disneyland. In 1948 Walt Disney and animator Ward Kimball attended the fair. To their enjoyment they not only got to see all of the equipment, but they were also allowed to operate some of the steam locomotives that were at the Fair. Upon their return to Los Angeles, Disney used the Fair, the House of David Amusement Park, and Greenfield Village, as inspiration for a "Mickey Mouse Park" that eventually became Disneyland. Walt also went on to build his own backyard railroads, building the Carolwood Pacific Railroad. Kimball already had his own, named Grizzly Flats Railroad.

== Media of fair ==
=== Photos from the Fair ===
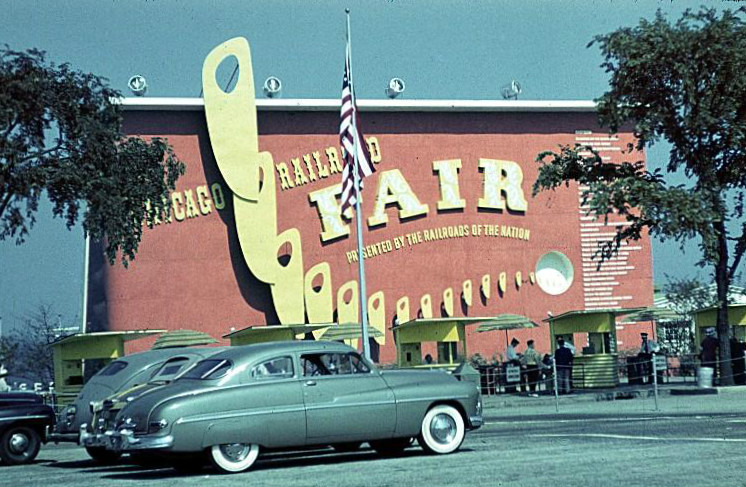
The main entrance.

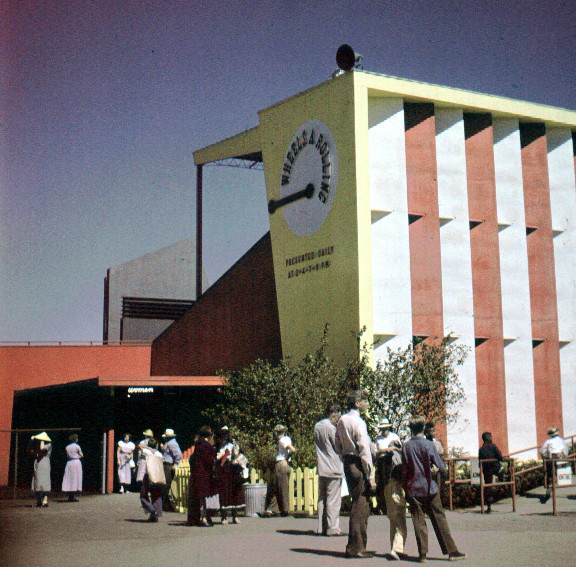
Entering the fair.

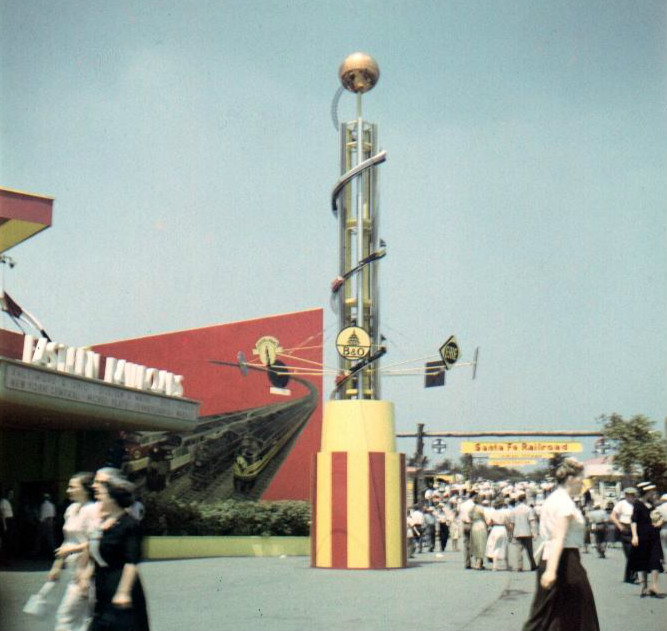
The concourse with its exhibits.

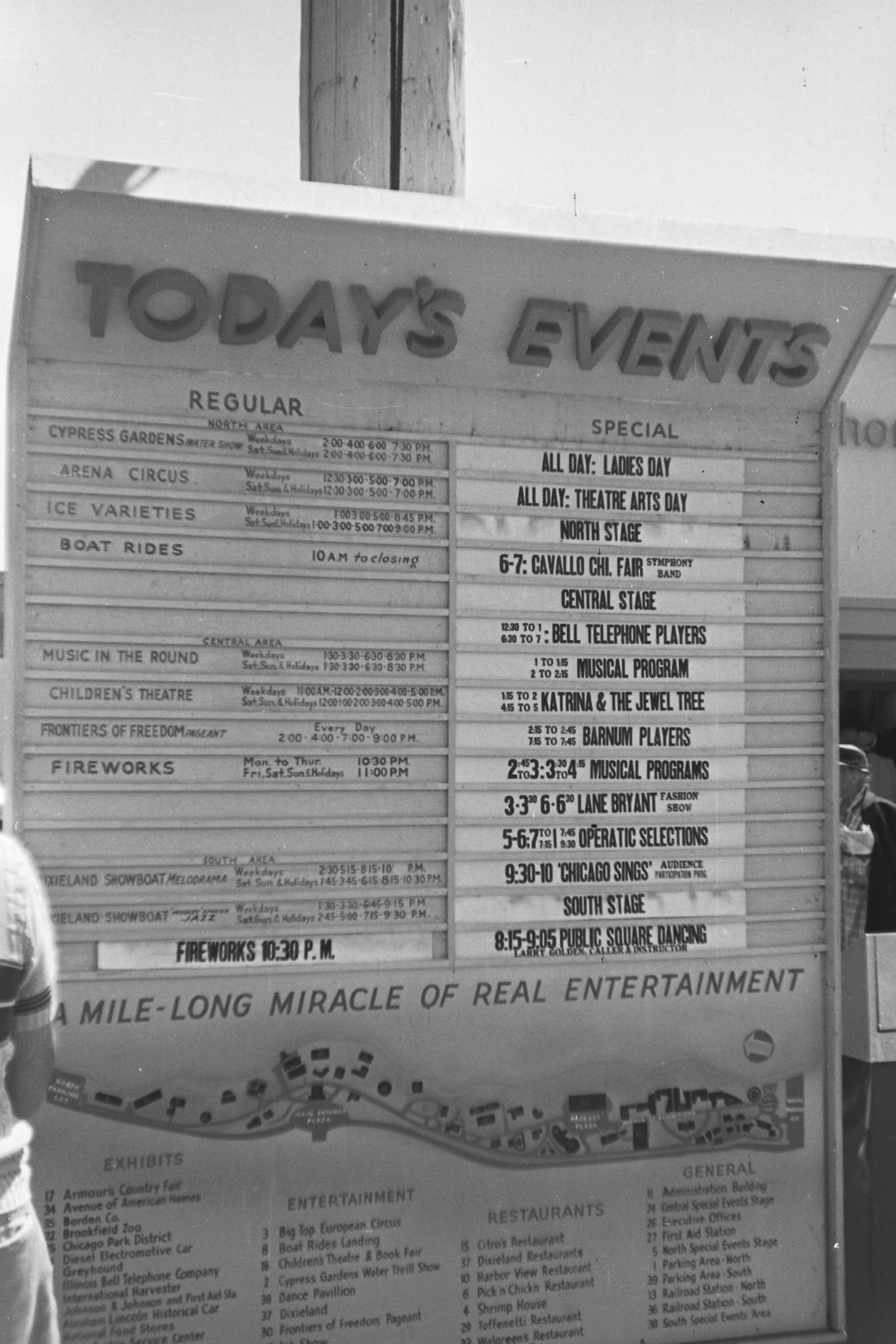
The fair's daily event board.

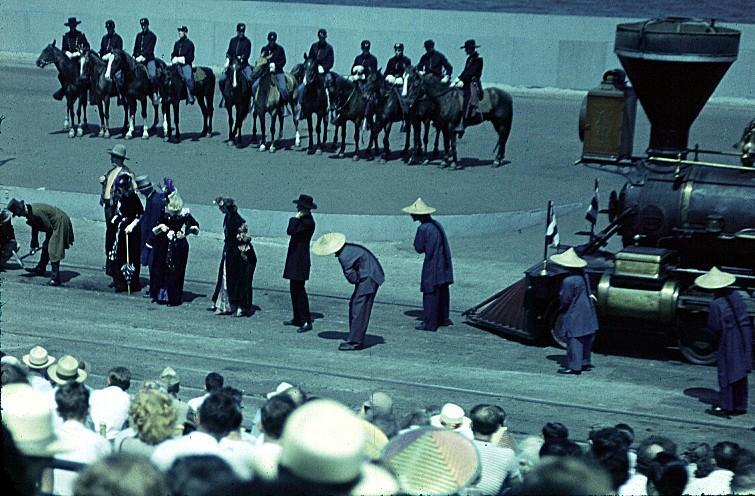
Reenactment of the Golden Spike Ceremony.

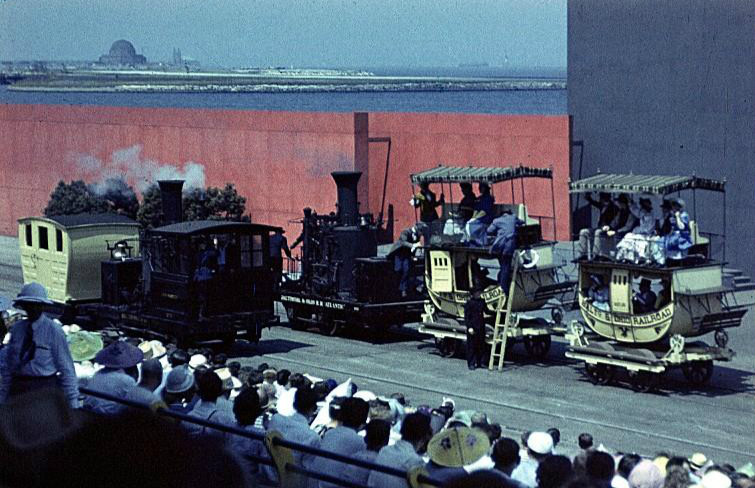
Old locomotive display.

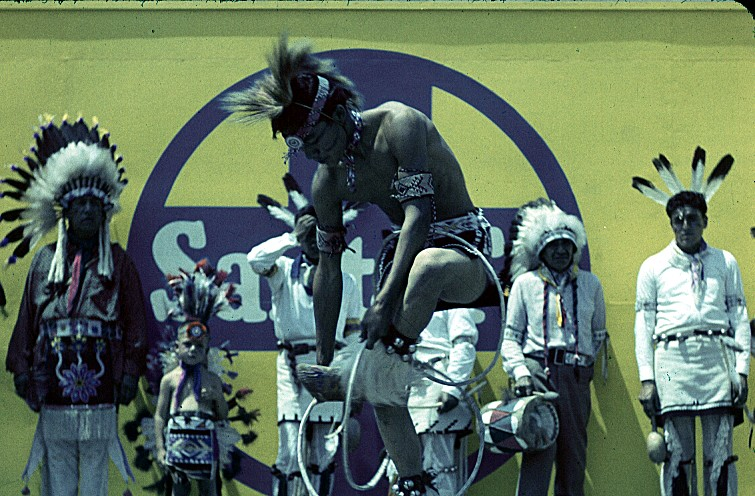
Native dancers from the Santa Fe exhibit.

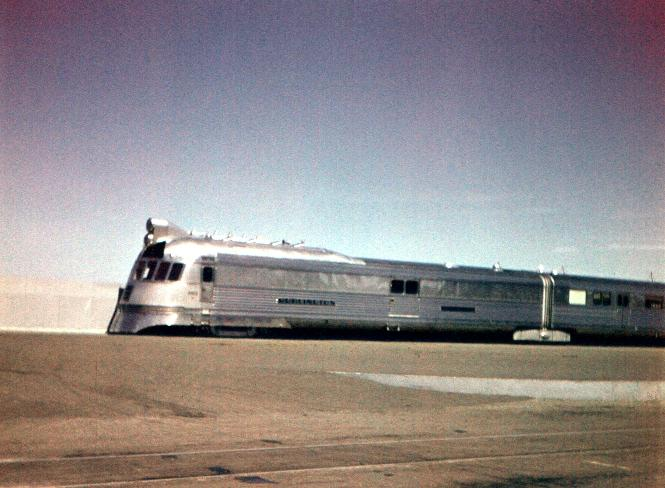
Burlington's Pioneer Zephyr.

=== Films from the Fair ===
- Chicago Railroad Fair & Pageant (Chicago Film Archives, Margaret Conneely Collection, 1950, 16mm., Color, Sound)
- 1948: Chicago Railroad Fair (Chicago Film Archives, Lake Shore Club of Chicago Collection, c 1948, 8mm, Color Silent)
