= Ronn Pitts =

American filmmaker (1933–2013)

Ronn Pitts (1933–September 2013) was an American filmmaker who gained prominence through documenting the civil rights movement in Chicago during the 1960s and 1970s. Pitts was a native of Bronzeville, Chicago. He is most notable for having broken the color barrier in Chicago's film industry, becoming the first black filmmaker to be hired by the NFL, and the first black professor hired in the film department at Columbia College.

== Career ==
=== Film Group ===
Pitts' filmmaking career began as a camera assistant for the local production company the Film Group. Film Group was an active commercial company, producing advertisements for United Airlines, Kentucky Fried Chicken, Aunt Jemima, and many others. Film Group also made social documentaries, and this provided access for Pitts to meet many influential groups and figures associated with the civil rights movement. As a part of Film Group, Pitts worked on the influential American Revolution 2, a documentary covering the riots and police brutality on display at the 1968 Democratic National Convention held in Chicago. Pitts also worked with Film Group on other such notable films as The Murder of Fred Hampton (1971) documenting the assassination of the leader of the Black Panther's Illinois chapter, and Lord Thing (1970), a film depicting the Chicago gang the Conservative Vice Lords, Inc. as a positive influence in the community.

=== NFL ===
Pitts would go on to break the color barrier in the white male dominated film industry by becoming the first black filmmaker to be hired by the NFL to document the Chicago Bears for 11 years along with his friend and fellow filmmaker Joe Stratton. While working for the Bears he captured footage of Detroit Lions wide receiver Chuck Hughes' death in the final minutes of a game against the Bears in 1971. Pitts was also filming during the assassinations of Malcolm X and Harvey Milk - experiences which all had a profound impact on him throughout his life.

=== Columbia College ===
Pitts was hired as the first black professor in the film department at Columbia College in 1971. Pitts was influential in transforming the Columbia College film program into a more diverse student body and with a sharper focus in on-location shooting. Pitts also taught industry seminars at the Community Film Workshop of Chicago, an organization committed to providing classes and resources to young filmmakers on Chicago's South Side.

=== Awards ===
Pitts was often recognized by the Chicago film community and the city of Chicago, receiving lifetime achievement awards from Columbia College and the Bronzeville Cultural Festival in 1998 and 2010 respectively, and having October 10, 1998 named "Ronn Pitts Day" by mayor of Chicago Richard M. Daley.

== Personal life ==
Ronn Pitts is survived by three children, Aaron Parker, Gayle D. Parker and Ronde-Stephens-Pitts.
