= Thomas Miller (visual artist) =

American artist (1920–2012)

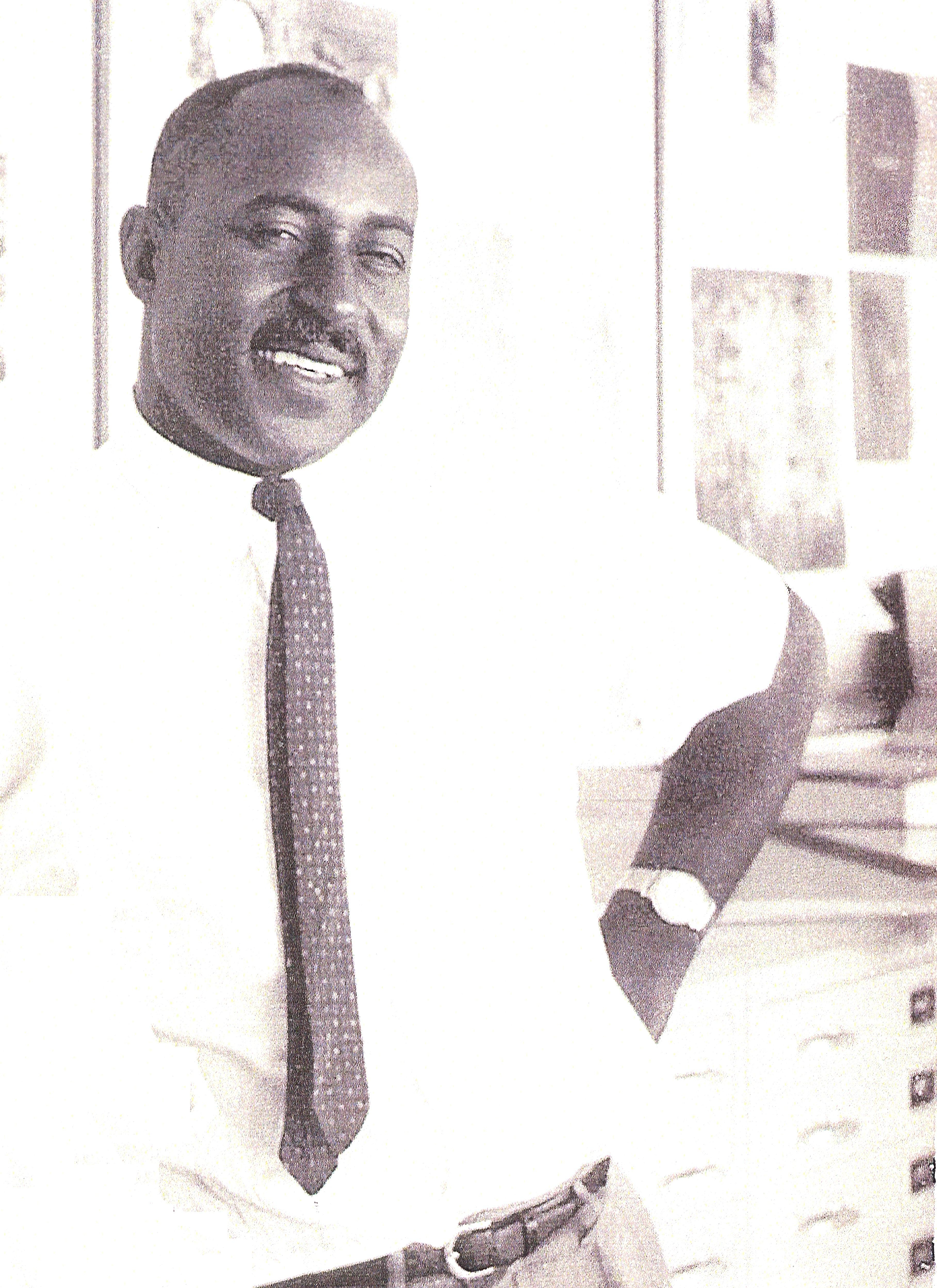
- Thomas Miller at the offices of Morton Goldsholl Associates, c.1958
- Born: December 24, 1920; Bristol, Virginia, U.S.
- Died: July 19, 2012 (aged 91); Chicago, Illinois, U.S.
- Education: Ray Vogue School of Art, (now the Ray College of Design)
- Known for: Oils; Watercolors; Acrylics; Monotype; Sculpture; Mosaics; Fome-Cor; Portraiture; Commercial Art
- Movement: Abstract Expressionism; Realism; Modernism
- Spouse: Anita Miller
- Children: Joyce Miller-Bean; Thomas Miller, Jr. Pamela Miller
- Patrons: Margaret Taylor-Burroughs; Harold Washington; Deloris Jordan

Mosaic portrait of Wilberforce Jones, one of the founders of the DuSable Museum of African American History, by Thomas Miller. It is installed in the lobby of the museum.

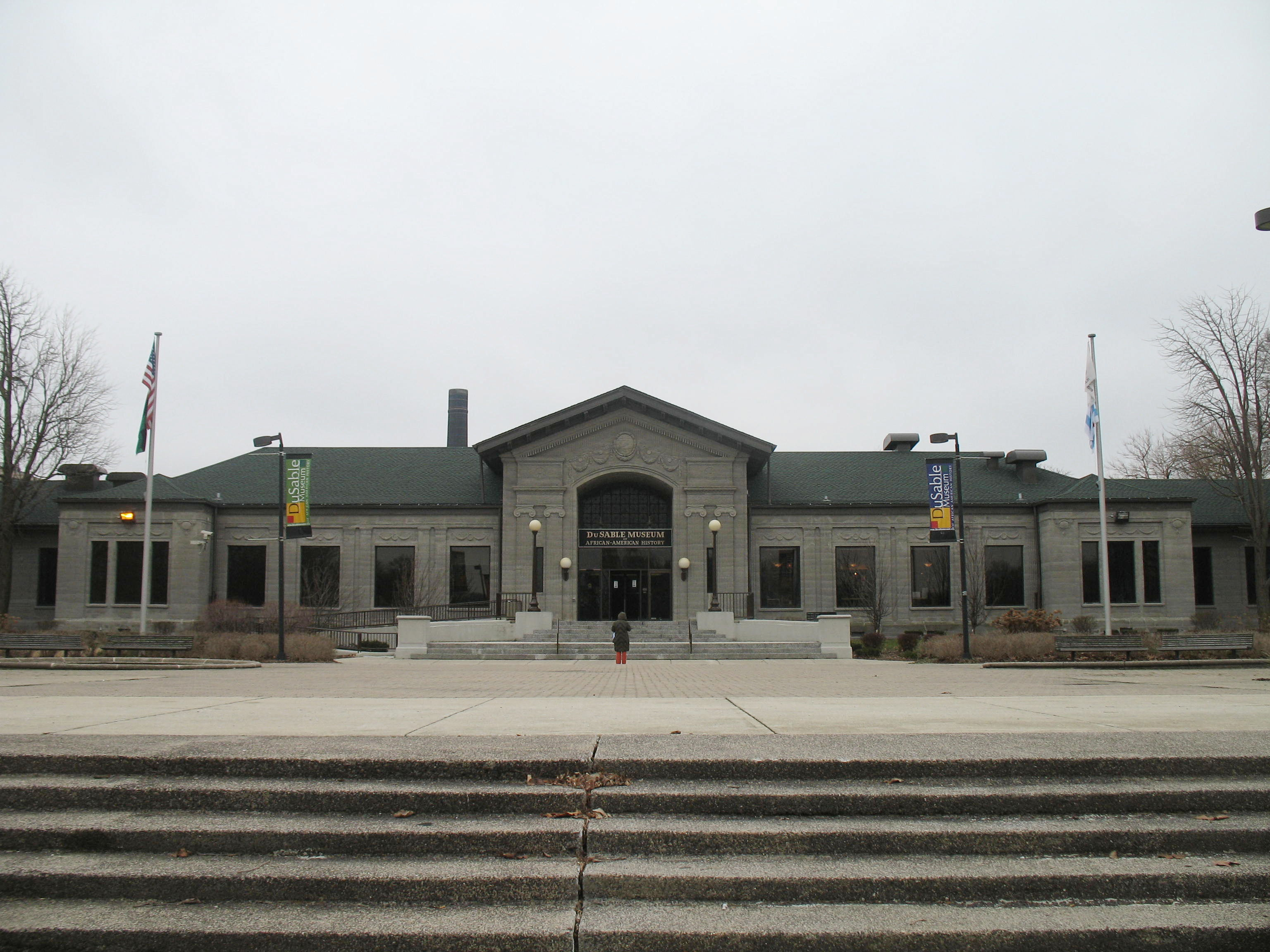
The DuSable Museum of African American History, Chicago, IL, where the Thomas Miller mural mosaics (c.1995) are installed in the lobby.

Thomas Miller (December 24, 1920 – July 19, 2012) was an American graphic designer and visual artist, whose best known publicly accessible work is the collection of mosaics of the founders of DuSable Museum of African American History in Chicago, Illinois. He designed the logos of Motorola and the Peace Corps while employed at the Chicago studio of Morton Goldsholl Associates and was the creative director of the 1975 rebrand of 7-Up.

== Biography ==
=== Early life ===
Miller was born in Bristol, Virginia, where he graduated from Douglas High School in 1937. He then attended Virginia State College (now Virginia State University) which was founded in 1882 as the country's first fully state supported four-year institution of higher learning for African-Americans.

He graduated from there in 1941 after having earned a bachelor's degree in education with a focus on art, and subsequently enlisted in the U.S. Army, where he attained the rank of first sergeant, serving in the 3437 Quartermaster Truck Company during World War II.

=== Education ===
Although a formal education in art was not available to Miller during his childhood, he pursued his interest with a tenacity that would prove to be a prominent characteristic of his personality later in life. The black libraries that were accessible to him as a child in the south were generally not provided with the art history books that he was interested in studying, but he was able to use libraries normally accessible only to white people to explore the offerings of history's major artists. It was there that Miller discovered Leonardo da Vinci, whose work was an inspiration that continued to influence him to the end of his life.

Miller didn't have the opportunity to formally study Commercial art until he came to Chicago after being discharged from the army. It was there, determined to develop his talent, that Miller applied to and was accepted as a student at the Ray Vogue School of Art. This was not easily accomplished in those days, and he and his fellow student Emmett McBain ". . .were the only African-Americans [there] besides the janitors." The school had been founded in 1916 as The Commercial Art School, and was one of the first colleges of applied art and design in the United States.

By 1946, when Miller became a student, Ray Vogue had a national reputation as a leading educator in professional art and fashion design. While at Ray Vogue, Miller studied commercial and graphic art, and completed his studies there in 1950.

=== Morton Goldsholl Associates ===
Miller began his career as a professional artist with a brief stint in the Chicago offices of Gerstel-Loeff before joining Morton Goldsholl Associates, a studio that was known at the time for its "progressive hiring policies", in that it was one of the few firms then that hired minorities and women in a professional capacity. Because it was a small office with a reputation for innovation and quality, it was a rare occasion when a chance to work for Goldsholl presented itself, and when this happened in 1950, Miller pursued the opportunity with his usual diligence.

Years later during an interview, he described an early part of the discussion he had with Goldsholl (1911–1995): "Morton Goldsholl told me, unlike the other people, that he wanted a designer. And he said that he wasn't hiring me because I was black and he felt sorry for me. He said he was hiring me because he needed a designer. That turned a corner for me."

The road to Goldsholl was not an easy one, considering that it was necessary for Miller to overcome the obstacle that was created by the color of his skin. Although armed with a degree from a respected state university and later training as a commercial artist from a prestigious school, it became necessary for Miller to leave his wife Anita and their two children in the care of her sister in Florida, where the two women taught in the public schools, while he set out to find employment where he would be hired as an equal in his field.

His first efforts were made in New York City and New Jersey, and although he received an offer of employment with the understanding that he could work behind a screen so that his presence would not be obvious to the other designers and corporate clients, he considered this circumstance to be unacceptable. After exhausting whatever possibilities might have existed in the Northeastern United States, the next stop on his itinerary was Chicago, where he landed a job first with Gerstel-Loeff, and eventually with Morton Goldsholl. Miller flourished there, staying until his retirement some thirty-five years later.

Although a relatively small firm by Chicago standards (the office was founded in the early 1940s and consisted of only about a dozen people at any given time, including Morton Goldsholl and his wife, Millie Goldsholl), it was considered to be one of the best on the city of Chicago. In 1951, the firm was hired to develop the logo and graphic identity for Good Design, a collaborative exhibition and promotional program jointly developed by the Chicago Merchandise Mart and the Museum of Modern Art in New York after the success of the 1950 season.

The Goldsholls studied under László Moholy-Nagy at the New Bauhaus (now the IIT Institute of Design at the Illinois Institute of Technology), and as the studio developed, it became internationally renowned for its creative output, which included animation and the development of branding and packaging for major international organizations like Motorola, Quaker Oats and the Peace Corps. Animation by the firm included commercials for companies the caliber of Gillette and Hallmark, whose advertising budgets would allow them to go anywhere, but who instead elected to come to Morton Goldsholl Associates, "The most successful of [Chicago] animation producers". Millie Goldsholl was an accomplished photographer and was one of the founders in 1975 of the Midwest USA Chapter of ASIFA, the International Animated Film Association (l'Association Internationale du Film d'Animation).

The innovation of Morton Goldsholl Associates wasn't expressed only in art per se - for example in 1953 the firm designed "a new line of modern [children's] furniture that was designed to 'grow'" with the child, and was awarded a patent in 1985 for the invention of an "Image processor and method for use in making photographic prints", which was capable of making unusual images using ordinary photographic film. During his career at Goldsholl, Miller contributed to many of these projects, and was the primary designer at the studio of the new packaging and identity for 7-up in the mid-1970s. "The inspiration for the design just came to me" he said once during and interview. "What better way to represent graphically the effervescence of a carbonated beverage than by using circles as the basis of the design". For this project and others he earned several awards for both himself and for his company.

He was the first African American to break into the mainstream profession of graphic artist, and during the 1950s and 60's was one of few to maintain a membership in traditional trade organizations like The Society of Typographical Arts. Connections such as these were necessary to maintain and advance one's career.

=== Freelance work ===
Miller's career as an independent artist began unwittingly during the time he was stationed in Europe during World War II. With the shortages caused by the war, Miller's media by necessity was whatever he could lay his hands on - proper paper, pencils, paint and chalk were hard to come by - but never one to pass on an opportunity to paint, draw or sketch, Miller took whatever art paraphernalia he could improvise and went out on his free time to artistically record the beauty that was still Europe. This frequently led to a spontaneous commission, where Miller would part with his current project for pocket change (or equally as often by making a gift of it) when a passer-by stopped to admire his work. After the war and while he worked at Goldsholl Associates, Miller continued as an independent artist both by private commission and by displaying his work at various venues.

==== Founders Memorial at Du Sable Museum Chicago ====
The founders' murals are Miller's magnum opus, and beautifully demonstrate the creativity that is typical of his work. Unlike traditional mosaic that is made with earthenware or glass tile, these are made from thousands of pieces of plastic that were harvested from plastic egg crate light diffusers which were then individually colored and arranged to create the images in the series. "Anybody can do an oil painting," he said during an interview, "but to take a face and do it with squares is hard. They have to be turned at an angle to catch the light".

In addition to portraits of the founders, the series includes a portrait of Jean Baptiste Point du Sable, the late Chicago mayor Harold Washington, and a collage depicting the history of Chicago.It was at a show at Hyde Park in Chicago that Miller was approached by Margaret Taylor-Burroughs, then director of the DuSable Museum, to create some kind of memorial to the museum's founders. This meeting resulted in the creation of the Thomas Miller mosaics. Miller also used his talents to copy the works of better known artists for collectors who either couldn't afford the originals or which by their very nature were unavailable. For these commissions, the "copies" were always made different in some respect, either by a change in the size or color, or by the addition of some feature which only a side-by-side comparison of the original would reveal. This was an opportunity for Miller to study the style and technique of other artists, and served as an educational experience for him.

== Archive ==
The Thomas H. E. Miller design papers (MSMill99) are held at the University of Illinois Chicago archive. The collection includes photographs, proofsheets, slides, award certificates, realia, prototypes, calendars, periodicals and samples of his branding designs ranging from 1953-1996.

== Selected list of works ==
Over the course of a career (both independent and professional) that spanned nearly three quarters of a century, Miller produced over 1000 works of art that include internationally recognized corporate branding, illustrations for books, lithographs, drawings, sculptures, and various other projects. Below is a chronological listing of some of his more important and notable work.

=== At Morton Goldsholl ===
(As chief designer)

- 1976 - Redesign of the branding for 7 Up

(As a supporting member of the design team)

- c.1961 - Motorola.
  rebranding
- c.1961 - Peace Corps logo
- c.1973 - Betty Crocker "Chicken Helper" branding

=== As an independent artist ===
- Founders Mosaics - DuSable Museum of African American History

== Later life and death ==
Miller moved into the Smith Village assisted living home in the Morgan Park community in Chicago, where he continued to paint. The dining room at Smith Village was named after him in 2008 when he was 88 years old. Thomas Miller died in his sleep at his home on July 19, 2012.

== Awards and recognition ==
In 2021, Miller was posthumously awarded the AIGA Medal for "expanding recognition".
