= My Friend Vince =

Independent Canadian documentary film

My Friend Vince is a 1975 independent Canadian documentary film about a Toronto street hustler that interrogates the relationship of the filmmaker to his subject.

== Production ==
The first-time director, David Rothberg, made the film in collaboration with Howard Alk, an accomplished filmmaker from Chicago who, at the time, was in Canada working on Janis, a documentary about the late Janis Joplin, for Crawley Films. Alk shot and edited My Friend Vince. Peter Rowe recorded sound. Daniel Lynch and Malcolm Mactavish assisted. The entire crew worked as volunteers. The film, which was shot in super 16mm black and white, was financed for less than $2,000, $1,200 of which was funded by the Canada Council for the arts.

== Synopsis ==
My Friend Vince is structured around a conversation Rothberg and Vince have in the dingy kitchen of Rothberg's apartment on Spadina Avenue. Rothberg asks Vince about his practice, and Vince tells Rothberg stories about various con jobs he's performed, while in the window behind them, day turns to night turns to day turns to night.

The conversation is intercut with short interviews Rothberg conducts with various other Toronto street hustlers about Vince; an older con artist, Vince's former partner, his current partner, and a young woman who knows Vince from the street scene around Yonge and Bloor. In these interviews, what's explored is the nature of friendship amongst people whose survival often depends upon deceit.

Three quarters of the way through the film, Rothberg invites Vince to interview him. Director and subject switch roles and, catalyzed by Alk's prompting, both discover that, all along, there was more than one con man at the table.

== Reception ==
In the late 1970s My Friend Vince screened at the Donnell Public Library in an exhibition sponsored by the Museum of Modern Art, the Knoxville Film Festival, and the former Roxy Cinema, and the former Cinema Lumiere in Toronto. Through the early 1980s it was taught as an example of "self-reflexive" cinema in the curricula of various university film studies programs. The film was not exhibited for forty years. In 2022 the Canadian Film Makers Distribution Center began distributing My Friend Vince.
