= Mike Gray =

American political writer (1935–2013)

- Born: Harold Michael Gray; October 26, 1935; Racine, Wisconsin, U.S.
- Died: April 30, 2013 (aged 77); Los Angeles, California, U.S.
- Occupations: Director, producer, screenwriter, cinematographer
- Years active: 1969-1996

Harold Michael Gray (October 26, 1935 – April 30, 2013) was an American writer, screenwriter, cinematographer, film producer and director.

== Career ==
=== Film and TV ===
In 1965, Mike Gray and Jim Dennett co-founded The Film Group, a Chicago film production company. In 1968, the pair along with editor Howard Alk, produced the award-winning documentary American Revolution 2 (1969), followed by the trio's The Murder of Fred Hampton (1971). The Film Group was also behind the seven part educational series, "Urban Crisis and the New Militants", consisting primarily of footage shot during the production of American Revolution 2 but also includes footage of Chicago Black Panthers members (including future Congressman Bobby Rush) and a 1966 Civil Rights march in Cicero, Illinois. This series can be streamed on Chicago Film Archives' website and Chicago Film Archives's channel on YouTube.

After moving to California, Gray shot The Gift (1973), a documentary about the life and art of Marc Chagall then co-wrote, with T. S. Cook and James Bridges, the screenplay for the nuclear thriller The China Syndrome (1979), which film became notable for opening 12 days before the Three Mile Island accident (nuclear reactor meltdown). He also wrote and directed Wavelength (1983), an independent science fiction film starring Robert Carradine, Cherie Currie, and Keenan Wynn, with a soundtrack by Tangerine Dream.

Gray next co-created the television series Starman (1986–87). Following Starman, he became series writer/producer for the 1988–89 season of Star Trek: The Next Generation. Gray was a second unit director on The Fugitive (1993) and acted as Swizlard in Chain Reaction (1996). Gray scripted The Zone and Forget About Yesterday in 2008, and was working with director Andy Davis and legendary filmmaker, Haskell Wexler on an as yet untitled documentary.

=== Bibliography ===
- The Warning (1982), about the accident at Three Mile Island
- Drug Crazy: How We Got Into This Mess and How We Can Get Out (1998)
- Angle of Attack (1992), a biography of Harrison Storms which also details America's race to the moon
- The Death Game: The Luck of the Draw (2003)
- Editor: Busted: Stone Cowboys, Narco-Lords and Washington's War on Drugs (2002), a book about the USA's drug war

== Activism ==
Gray was President and Co-Founder of the Common Sense for Drug Policy Foundation. The organization produced ads with facts about the drug war, and Gray produced several Public Service Announcements on the topic.

== Personal life ==
Gray grew up in Indiana and graduated from Purdue University with a degree in engineering. He later lived in Los Angeles, California with his wife, Carol Dana Hirsch, a reporter for public radio. His son, Lucas, is a storyboard artist for The Simpsons.

== Death ==
Gray died at his desk April 30, 2013.
