= Larry Janiak =

American filmmaker, animator, and designer (born 1938)

- Born: February 15, 1938 (age 88); Chicago, Illinois, United States
- Occupations: Filmmaker, animator, designer

Larry Janiak (born 15 February 1938) is an American filmmaker, animator and designer. Janiak was born in Chicago, Illinois and attended Lane Technical College Prep High School where he collaborated with Wayne Boyer and Ronald Larson to create animated cartoon shorts. These high school films were recognized by the Chicago Tribune, Hollywood and the IIT Institute of Design. Janiak then attended the Institute of Design and learned under the influence of László Moholy-Nagy's principles of the "American Bauhaus". After school, Janiak began work in advertising, where he employed these principles of design, and the experimental practices he learned at Institute of Design in his industrial filmmaking. Janiak not only made advertising films, he also created documentaries, experimental films, animations, graphic design pieces, and worked as a professor at the Institute of Design from 1968 to 1980. Much of his work was inspired by his spiritual practices with the Vivekananda Vedanta Society in Chicago, which he was a member of beginning in 1965.

== Early years ==
Larry Janiak was born on February 15, 1938, and grew up in both the southwest and northwest side of Chicago. When Larry was six, his family moved to a northwest neighborhood of Chicago, close to the Indian Boundary Forest Preserve, the Che-Che-Pin-Qua Woods and the Des Plaines River. Larry attended Lane Tech High School, where he would begin filmmaking.

At Lane Tech High School, Larry created cartoon animations with Wayne Boyer and Ronald Larson, which would catch the attention of the Chicago Tribune, and even Hollywood. The high school students found inspiration in nature, experimenting with stop motion photography in the nearby woods during their summers. They honed their camera skills, and then began the process of creating drawn animation. Their final project consisted of roughly 200,000 drawings. The students showed their animations at various theaters and galleries in the Chicago area; they were invited to Hollywood, where they met with Walt Disney; and Janiak received the Scholastic magazine tuition scholarship to attend the Institute of Design at the Illinois Institute of Technology.

At the Institute of Design, Larry was taught printmaking by Misch Kohn, a world renowned artist whose etching and prints were displayed at the Art Institute of Chicago, as well as in Paris, Stockholm and London. While at I.D., Janiak worked for Richard Kliedon Animation studio.

== Career ==
=== Commercial and studio work ===
Janiak worked for Richard Kliedon Animation from 1957–1959. He then began work for Mort and Millie Goldsholl of Morton Goldsholl Associates based out of Northfield, Illinois. At Goldsholl Associates, Janiak was at home with other I.D. graduates who also learned from the design principles of Laszlo Moholy-Nagy. Their common backgrounds contributed to a highly experimental design studio unlike many others in Chicago at the time, where the use of montage, collage, and light experimentation was encouraged. The studio created advertisements for companies such as Kimberly-Clark. Janiak collaborated on the industrial film Faces and Fortunes made for Kimberly-Clark Corporation. The film was intended to clarify the importance of a corporate identity and the importance of good marketing. It discusses the history of corporate identity and branding, drawing upon the use of family crests in the medieval period. This film incorporated many different methods, such as drawn animation, direct animation, collage, and stop-motion animation of objects. Faces and Fortunes won more awards than any other film previously produced by Morton Goldsholl Associates.

=== Army ===
In 1962 Janiak was drafted into the United States Army, and served until 1964. While in the army, he continued his work in film. He worked as the director of an educational television station of the U.S. Army Signal Corps Signal School and Communications Research Center at Fort Monmouth, New Jersey. During his serving, he also created Adames Film (1963), Glasshouse (1964), and Agamemnon in New York (1964). Glasshouse (1964) is an experimental documentary of a terrarium, made by Janiak himself with color 16mm film. Agamemnon in New York (1964) produced with black and white 16mm film captures Janiak carrying out a conversation, but acting as both people, in a humorous portrait of work at Goldsholl Design & Film Associates.

=== Teaching ===
In 1968 Janiak became a professor of design animation and experimental filmmaking at the Institute of Design, and helped to grow the school's animation department. The animation program did grow at I.D., and in 1978 there were 30 animation majors earning degrees. Peter Gorner interviewed Larry Janiak for his article "Tempo A" in the Chicago Tribune, and discusses the tedious nature, and lengthy process that animation requires. One of Janiak's students worked for four years on only a 30 minute long animation.

== Notable films ==
Disintegration Line #1 was made in 1960 using black and white 16mm film, and is a direct animation depicting lines and abstract shapes resembling the infinitesimal nuclei which move and flicker across the screen. The film is silent, but the movement of the shapes is meant to resemble Tanmatra, a moving field of aggregates of atoms and cosmic motion called the dance of Shiva.

Adams Film (1963) was a visual collage experiment that combines live action footage of a Chicago Earth Day parade and domestic scenes of the Janiak family with abstract images and textures drawn directly on 16mm film. The soundtrack consists of assorted tape loops.

Life and Film (1965) is an experimental film that functions as a "picture postcard", depicting the experience of young filmmakers walking along a path in the Michigan sand dunes.

Disintegration Line #2 (1970) was created using 16mm film that was randomly animated to create sporadic movements of shapes and colors in subtle visual sequences in discernible steps of intensity. The film is set to Gamelan, music traditional to the Vivekananda Vedanta Society.

== Awards ==
Larry Janiak received recognition for his work starting in high school, winning awards such ash Gold Key awards from the National Scholastic magazine High School Contest, and was granted the opportunity to meet Walt Disney.

== Recent exhibitions and screenings ==
2007

- Vision in Motion: Filmmaking at the Institute of Design,, 1944–70, Gene Siskel Film Center

2013

- AMIA Archival Screening Night, Byrd Theatre

2014

- City to See, Museum of Contemporary Art Chicago
- Kinosonik #2, Black Cinema House

2015

- LLife & Film: Larry Janiak, Anthology Film Archives
- Wayne Boyer and Larry Janiak: Camera and Line, Gene Siskel Film Center

2017

- Art Basel Miami Screening: The Reflection in the Puddle is Mine, Art Basel Miami

2018

- Personal Legacies: Materiality and Abstraction, Chicago Cultural Center
