= Lenox R. Lohr =

Major Lenox Riley Lohr (1891–1968) was a contributor to the development of Chicago's lake front; organizer of exhibitions including the Century of Progress and Chicago Railroad Fairs; longtime president of Chicago's Museum of Science and Industry and promoter of civic and charitable causes.

== Early years ==
Lenox Riley Lohr was born in Washington, D.C. in 1891, a cousin of John Philip Sousa. He earned a degree in mechanical engineering from Cornell University in 1916 and took a commission as a second lieutenant in the same year in the U.S. Army Corps of Engineers.

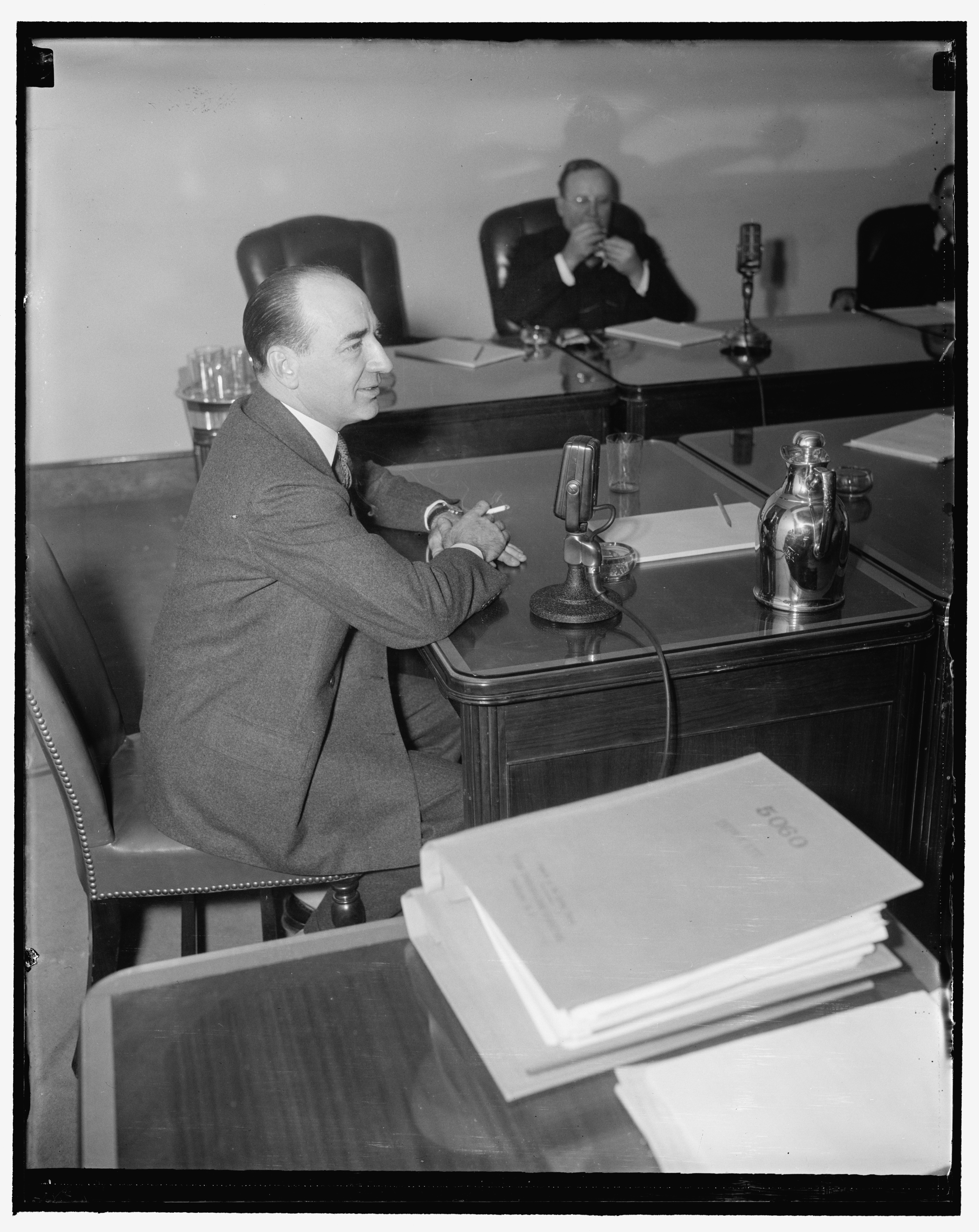

== World War I ==
Lohr served with the American Expeditionary Forces (AEF) in France where he advanced to the rank of major. He was awarded a Silver Star for gallantry in the Meuse–Argonne offensive. While taking a course in cryptography under William F. Friedman at the Riverbank Laboratory, he developed a method for the solution of certain transposition ciphers.

== The 1920s ==
From 1922 to 1929 Major Lohr worked in various capacities for the Army from 1922 to 1929 including executive secretary of the Society of American Engineers and was the editor of its journal The Military Engineer. In 1929 he resigned from the Army and was hired by Rufus C. Dawes, brother of former vice-president, Charles Dawes, as general manager of Chicago's Century of Progress world's fair. In his role he was primarily responsible for the coordination of construction, promotion and financial organization. The Century of Progress exhibition was a rare example of a world's fair that not only repaid all its investors in full, but closed with a surplus.

== The 1930s ==
After the close of the Century of Progress Major Lohr was hired as President of NBC Radio where he supervised NBC's earliest experiment with television. He also was involved in the negotiations and litigation which forced NBC to divest itself of its Blue Network.

== Museum of Science and Industry ==
In 1940 Major Lohr was named to succeed Rufus Dawes as president of Chicago's Museum of Science and Industry. At the time the museum was struggling to survive and find a place among other museums. Major Lohr changed the focus of the museum away from history and developed the concept of inviting business firms to establish state-of-the art exhibits with a commercial connection included. Under his 28-year tenure the museum became one of Chicago's most popular destinations. Under his management several iconic exhibits were established including Christmas Around the World (1942), Santa Fe model railroad (1943), Colleen Moore's Fairy Castle (1949), walk-through human heart (1952) and U-505 WWII German submarine (1954).

== Chicago Railroad Fair ==
In 1948 Major Lohr was appointed to organize the Chicago Railroad Fair. In only five months he brought together 39 American railroads, supervised the building of five miles of both standard and narrow gauge track on nearly the same grounds as the Century of Progress 25 years earlier. He coordinated the display and operation of a collection of modern and historic railroad and other transportation equipment including a pageant named "Wheels A Rolling" with several hundred participants. The fair's one-year run was extended in 1949.

== Other accomplishments ==
Lohr organized the "Centennial of Engineering" in 1952 in Chicago. and the Military and Industrial Conferences from 1955 to 1957. He was a member of the Chicago Park and Fair Corporation and its successor, the Metropolitan Fair and Exhibition Authority (1950–59). He served as chairman of the Illinois Higher Education Commission (1954–59) during which time the University of Illinois Chicago campus was established. He organized and served as chairman of the Illinois Civil Defense Agency (1950–53) and was a charter member of University of Illinois Citizens Committee. Directed the efforts to fund the restoration of the Jane Addam's Hull House. Awarded Distinguished Service Awards from both the U.S. Army and U.S. Navy, Lohr held the rank of Lt. Commander in the Naval Reserve. He received the Rosenberger Medal from the University of Chicago in 1963.
