= Cicero March =

- Still from Cicero March featuring Robert Lucas (center).
- Production company: The Film Group
- Release date: 1966
- Country: United States

Cicero March is a 1966 short documentary film made by the Chicago-based production company, The Film Group. The film details a civil rights march held on September 4, 1966, in Cicero, Illinois.

The film documents Robert Lucas and fellow members of the Congress of Racial Equality (CORE) as they lead activists through Cicero to protest the city of Chicago's restrictions in housing laws. White residents of Cicero respond with vitriolic jeers as the police struggle to prevent a riot.

Cicero March was filmed after Martin Luther King Jr., James Bevel, and other Southern Christian Leadership Conference members had come to Chicago to participate in the Chicago Freedom Movement and organize a movement calling for fair housing in Chicago. Chicago city officials, including Mayor Richard J. Daley, negotiated a Fair Housing agreement with Dr. King, Bevel, and others in August, and King and Bevel agreed to end demonstrations. Nevertheless, Robert Lucas and other members of CORE felt that the march was strategically necessary and proceeded with it anyway.

Cicero March is one of a seven part module or educational film series ("The Urban Crisis and the New Militants") produced by The Film Group that, "teach by raising questions rather than by attempting to answer them." The modules tell their story through editing rather than voice-over narration and show "real events, with real people acting spontaneously," as the Film Group explained to NewenhouseNovo, a now defunct educational film distributor.

The original 16mm film prints and elements made for Cicero March in 1966 reside at Chicago Film Archives within the Film Group Collection. In 2013 Cicero March was selected for preservation in the National Film Registry by the Library of Congress.

== See also ==
- Civil rights movement in popular culture
- List of American films of 1966
