= Chicago Film Archives =

Regional moving image archive founded in 2003

Chicago Film Archives (CFA) is a regional moving image archive located in Chicago, Illinois. CFA is a tax-exempt nonprofit organization dedicated to identifying, collecting, preserving and providing access to films that reflect Chicago and the Midwest region of the United States. Since its founding in late 2003, the archive has expanded to include over 160 film collections, which combined contain nearly 30,000 films and elements. CFA safeguards its moving image collections through stabilization, digitization, and climate-controlled-storage.

== History ==
CFA was established as a non-profit 501(c)(3) institution in late 2003 in order to preserve and catalogue over five thousand 16mm films donated by the Chicago Public Library. Director Nancy Watrous and a few devoted film archivists then conceived a plan to create a regional film archive that preserves, promotes, and exhibits moving image materials that reflect Chicago and Midwest history and culture. In May 2004, CFA moved to its permanent home at 329 West 18th Street in the Pilsen neighborhood of Chicago.

In 2020, CFA staff rediscovered a lost silent film from 1923 in the Charles E. Krosse Collection, The First Degree (film).

== The collection ==
CFA's collections consist of both professional and amateur films. The genres and forms of CFA's collections include educational films, industrial films, documentaries, advertisements, newsreels, experimental films, amateur films, and home movies. The majority of the collections consist of small gauge film formats, including 16mm, 8mm, and Super 8mm motion picture film. CFA's Collection Portal hosts CFA collection finding aids as well as over 1,500 streaming digitized films from CFA's collections.

=== Notable collections ===
- DeWitt Beall Collection: films made by Chicago filmmaker DeWitt Beall, including the 1970 documentary Lord Thing about the Conservative Vice Lords
- Margaret Conneely Collection: films and papers of Margaret Conneely, a prolific and respected Chicago amateur filmmaker
- Russ & Sylvia Davis Collection: wrestling films featuring professional bouts shot at Chicago's International Amphitheatre in the early 1950s. Many of these bouts are streaming on CFA's YouTube Channel, Chicago Film Archives presents "Wrestling from Chicago"
- JoAnn Elam Collection: films and papers of independent Chicago filmmaker JoAnn Elam
- Film Group Collection: political documentaries on the 1968 Democratic National Convention and 1960's civil rights movement, including the 1966 short film, Cicero March
- Mort and Millie Goldsholl Collection: advertising films made by Goldsholl Design & Film Associates, one of Chicago's leading graphic design studios in the 1950s through 1970s
- Julian Gromer Collection: travelogues and related papers created by filmmaker and lecturer Julian Gromer
- Larry Janiak Collection: experimental films and documentaries made by Chicago filmmaker, designer and Institute of Design IIT alum, Larry Janiak
- Don Klugman Collection: experimental and educational films made by Chicago-based filmmaker Don Klugman
- Don McIlvaine Collection: home movies and short films shot by Chicago African-American artist and muralist Don McIlvaine
- Ruth Page Collection: films and videotapes that document the dance legacy and artistic circle of dancer and choreographer, Ruth Page
- Rhodes Patterson Collection: films that document the rapidly developing city of Chicago during the mid-century and the life of Rhodes Patterson, a designer, cinematographer, photographer, and writer who worked for Container Corporation of America
- Robert Stiegler Collection: experimental films and home movies created by Chicago-based photographer and Institute of Design IIT alum, Robert Stiegler
