= Arthur K. Atkinson =

Railroad executive (1892–1964)

Arthur K. Atkinson (1892–1964) was an executive of the Wabash Railroad. After working for the Denver and Rio Grande Railroad, he joined the Wabash in 1922 and was promoted to vice president in 1929. In 1947 he became chief financial officer, and president in 1947. He was elected to be chairman of the board in 1959, and he retired from the company in 1960.

In 1949, Atkinson served as a director for the Chicago Railroad Fair.

== Legacy ==
Railroad car ferry number 6 owned by Ann Arbor Railroad was named Arthur K. Atkinson in his honor on March 14, 1959, when it returned to the Great Lakes after a rebuild.

Preceded by	President of Wabash Railroad	Succeeded by
