= Wayne Boyer =

American filmmaker (born 1937)

- Born: 1937 (age 88–89)
- Occupation: Filmmaker

Wayne Boyer (born 1937) is an American filmmaker. He is involved in the preservation of architectural history through film and has worked alongside Millie and Morton Goldsholl in creating a new genre of design-based films in advertising. Boyer studied at the Institute of Design alongside filmmaker Larry Janiak and the filmmaker and photographer Robert Stiegler. Boyer played a central role in the development of Chicago's underground film scene in the 1960s, and he was teaching filmmaking at the University of Illinois at Chicago.

== Early life ==
Boyer's first introduction to film was in high school while experimenting with his father's camera. While attending Lane Technical High School in the 1950s, Boyer and Larry Janiak attended two iterations of the International Design Conference in Aspen (IDCA). It was at one of these conferences that the two students met Morton and Millie Goldsholl who organized the 1959 conference. After high school, Boyer went on to study at the Institute of Design, along with Janiak who is a filmmaker in Chicago's underground film community and graduated in 1970.

== Early work ==
In 1955, Boyer and his high school peers, Larry Janiak and Ronald Larson, had their animated cartoon films on display at the Tribune Tower Gallery. A 1955 Chicago Tribune article states that all three boys would be "invited to Hollywood to see first-hand film cartoon techniques used in commercial production." The trio "developed a specially equipped camera and photography table, valued at more than $1,000" These accomplishments caught the attention of Disney and the group was flown out to LA to visit the Disney studios. After Morton Goldsholl Design Associates hired Boyer, he, along with Larry Janiak, became the directors of Goldsholl filmmaking department.

== Films ==
| Title | |
|---|---|
| Faces and Fortunes | Goldsholl Associates, 1959, 16mm, Color, Sound, 12 min. "Preserved by Chicago Film Archives with support from the National Film Preservation Foundation." |
| Drop City | Wayne Boyer, 1968, 16mm., Color, Sound, 5 min. Drop City is an experimental documentary about a "rural commune" of that name made from found and recycled resources. The design of this city, inspired by Buckminster Fuller and Steve Baer and filmed in Trinidad, Colorado. This film was considered an "experimental documentary." and was made "with only two 100' rolls of 16mm film". Boyer shot Drop City a year before the commune started to fall apart, its popularity being from 1965 to 1969. |
| The Building: Chicago Stock Exchange | Wayne Boyer, 1975, 16mm, color, sound, 12 min. One of Boyer's more recognized films, The Building: Chicago Stock Exchange is a documentary that follows the destruction of one of Chicago's most famous buildings, originally located at 30 North LaSalle St. While filming, the project's photographer and preservationist, Richard Nickel, fell from the building and was killed. The film is dedicated in his memory. This film went on to be included in the Chicago Architecture Foundations show "Do We Dare Squander Chicago's Great Architectural Heritage?". The goal of this show was to convey the importance in preserving Chicago's architecture using works of art that told the stories of Chicago. |
| Agamemnon in New York | Wayne Boyer & Larry Janiak, 1964, 16mm, b&w, sound., 4.5 min. |
| George & Martha Revisited | Wayne Boyer, 1967, 16mm, B&W, Sound, 8 min. |
| The Loop: Where the Skyscraper Began | The Loop: Where the Skyscraper Began is a guide to Chicago's architecture history. It runs at just over thirty minutes and combines shots of scenic images of Chicago architecture and interviews with prominent architects. The film encompasses a wide variety of Chicago's architecture including: "the Home Insurance Company Building (1885), the Rookery (1885–88), the Monadnock Building (1889–93), the Reliance Building (1894–95), the Fischer Building (1895–96), the Carson Pirie Scott store (1899, 1903–04), the Chicago Board of Trade (1930; addition 1980), Inland Steel Building (1954–58), Sears Tower (1968-74), AT&T Corporate Center (1985–89), State of Illinois Center (1979–85), and the Harold Washington Library (1989–91)". Boyer's role in this film is writer as well as cinematographer. His "technical quality, content and programming potential" is rated as "good" by The Program for Art on Film in their book Architecture on Screen. |

== Later career ==
After leaving Goldsholl and Associates in the late 1960s, Boyer went to teach cinema and animation at the University of Illinois at Chicago. He is currently Professor Emeritus. Boyer was also instrumental in the founding of the Center Cinema Coop, "an important film distribution collective operating out of Chicago from the years 1968 to 1978".

== Personal life ==
Wayne is married to Eleanor Boyer, who played an active role in some of his projects and co-authored "The Loop: Where the Skyscraper Began".
