= The Film Group =

Film production company

- Industry: Film production
- Founded: 1964
- Founders: Mike Gray; Jim Dennett
- Defunct: 1973
- Headquarters: Chicago, Illinois, United States

The Film Group was a Chicago commercial film production company that made television commercials and political documentaries in the late 1960s and early 1970s. Filmmakers associated with the Film Group include Mike Gray, William Cottle, Howard Alk, Mike Shea, and Chuck Olin. The majority of their films reside at Chicago Film Archives within The Film Group Collection and Chuck Olin Collection.

Over its approximately ten-year existence from 1964-1973 the company went through a variety of name, location, and personnel changes. Mike Gray and Lars Hedman created Hedman Gray Inc. in 1964 and were located at Hedman's photography studio on 3325 West Huron in Chicago, Illinois. In early 1966 they added photographer Mike Shea. They changed the name of the company to Hedman Gray Shea Inc. and opened an 11,000 square foot state of the art production facility at 430 West Grant Place and soon after changed their name to the Film Group. At that point Hedman was the president, Shea was the director of photography, and Gray was the writer/producer. Right after the move to Grant Place they hired James Dennett as a production manager, William Cottle as the business manager and financial backer, and Chuck Olin as salesman. Hedman left the company by the end of 1966 and Shea left in 1967. Gray then took over as cameraman. Cottle left in 1969 and the company changed its name to Mike Gray Associates and moved to 120 West Kinzie. The company was dissolved in 1973 with Gray's move to California.

From 1965 to 1972 they made TV commercials for national and local clients including Eli Lilly and Company, Montclair cigarettes, Hills Bros Coffees, Mogen David, Sara Lee, WBIB TV, Aunt Jemima, Blue Cross Blue Shield, Illinois Bell, Quaker Oats, Chicago Tribune, Kentucky Fried Chicken, and Sears. They also made longer sponsored films for clients that are closer to their documentary work including A Matter of Opportunity (1970) and 8 Flags for 99 Cents (1970).

Their documentary films include the two features- American Revolution II (1969) and The Murder of Fred Hampton (1971). The two films are closely related and document the unrest of the 1968 Democratic National Convention, follow the Chicago chapter of the Black Panthers, and refute the city of Chicago's media cover up of Fred Hampton’s death. In 1969 they released a seven part educational film series Urban Crisis and the New Militants in an attempt to update the educational film genre. This series includes the 1966 film Cicero March, which was added to the National Film Registry in 2013.
