= Pioneer (locomotive) =

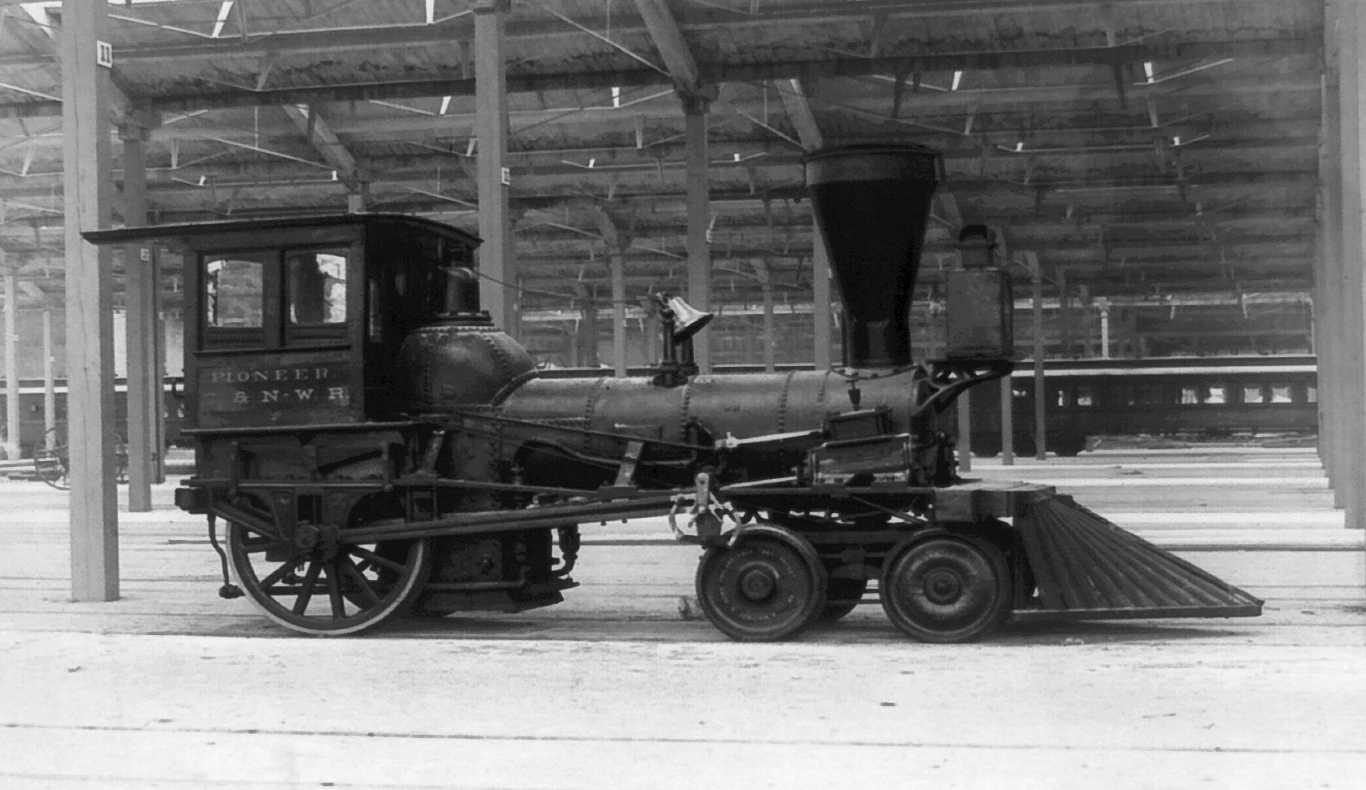
- Pioneer c. 1898
Type and origin
- Power type: Steam
- Builder: Baldwin Locomotive Works
- Build date: 1837; 189 years ago
Specifications
- Configuration
  - Whyte: 4-2-0
- Gauge: 4 ft 8 1/2 in (1,435 mm) standard gauge
- Driver dia.: 54 in (1,372 mm)
- Loco weight: 24,000 lb (11,000 kg; 11 t)
- Fuel type: Wood
- Water cap.: 1,015 US gal (3,840 L; 845 imp gal)
- Cylinders: Two, outside
- Cylinder size: 10 in × 18 in (254 mm × 457 mm)
Career
- Operators: Utica and Schenectady Railroad (U&S), Michigan Central Railroad (MC), Galena and Chicago Union Railroad (G&CU), Chicago and North Western Railroad (C&NW), Chicago, Burlington and Quincy Railroad (CB&Q)
- Official name: Alert (U&S), Pioneer (G&CU)
- Retired: 1875
- Disposition: Locomotive on static display, tender stored until 1977 when it was dismantled and subsequently destroyed

Pioneer is the first railroad locomotive to operate in Chicago, Illinois. It was built in 1837 by Baldwin Locomotive Works for the Utica and Schenectady Railroad (U&S) in New York, then purchased used by William B. Ogden for the Galena and Chicago Union Railroad (G&CU, the oldest predecessor of Chicago and North Western Railway). The locomotive arrived in Chicago by schooner on October 10, 1848, and it pulled the first train westbound out of the city on October 25 that year.

== History ==
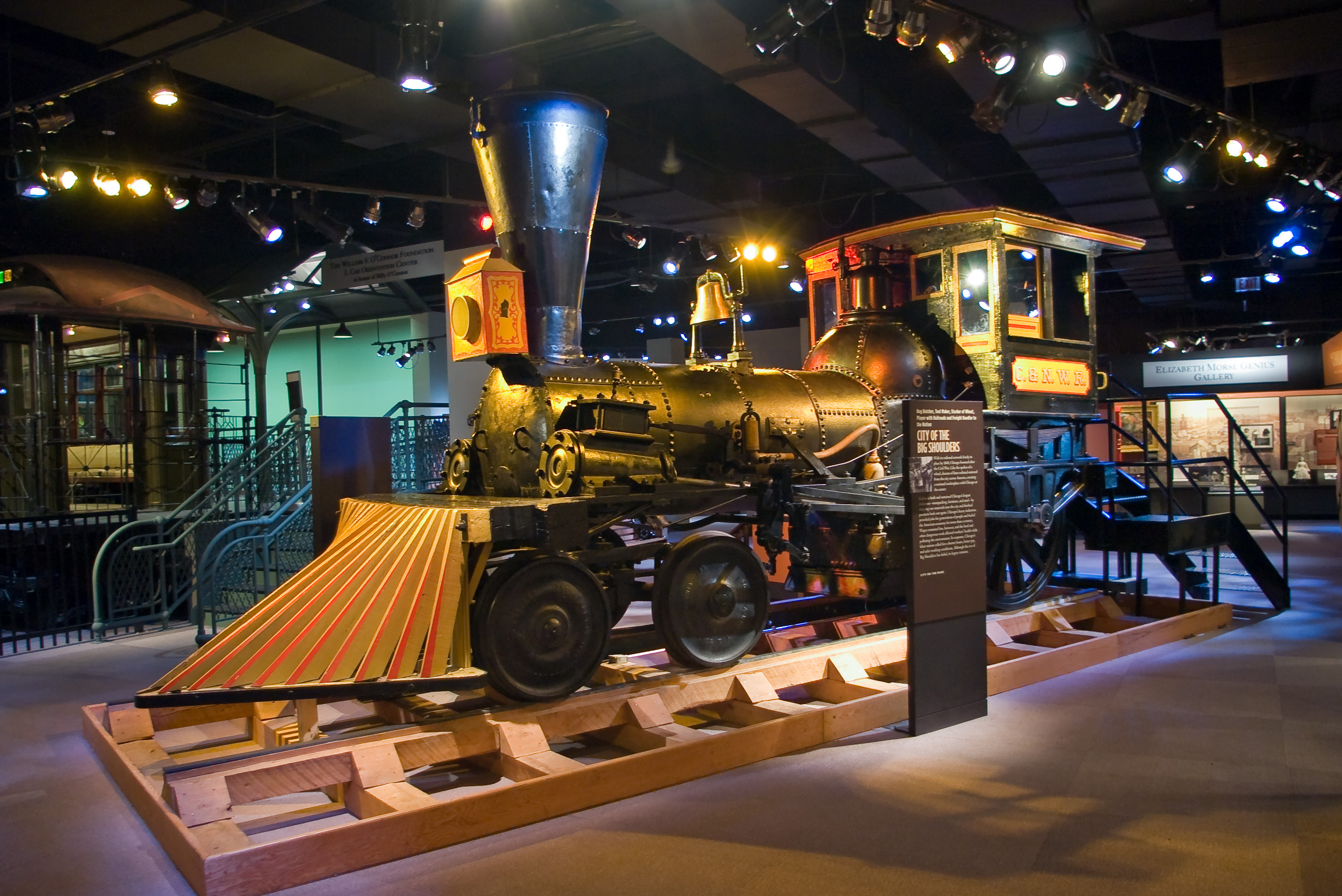
Pioneer on display at the Chicago History Museum

The locomotive was built by Baldwin in 1837 for the U&S which gave it the name Alert. It worked almost a decade before being sold in 1848 to the Galena and Chicago Union Railroad. The G&CU renamed it Pioneer and used it in the construction of the G&CU until 1850, when it was loaned to the Chicago, Burlington and Quincy Railroad for work laying the first track in Chicago that summer. Pioneer was returned and became its road work locomotive. After the G&CU was merged into the Chicago and North Western (C&NW), the locomotive remained in service until it was retired in 1875 at West Chicago, IL

The locomotive has been preserved and is on display at the Chicago History Museum.
