= Chicago History Museum =

Public museum in Chicago, Illinois, US

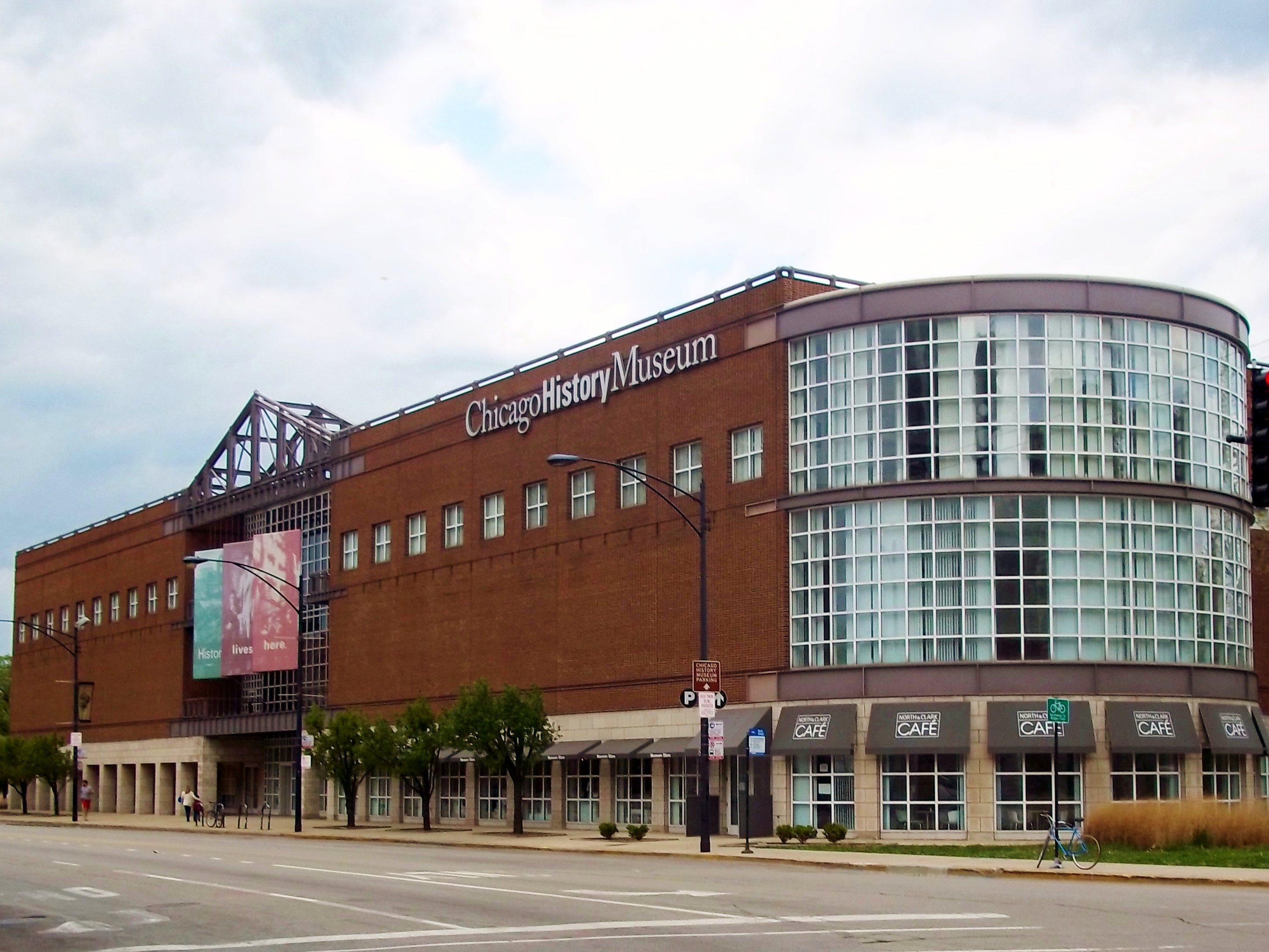
- Clark Street facade of the Chicago History Museum
- Established: April 1856; 170 years ago
- Location: 1601 North Clark Street, Chicago, Illinois 60614
- Coordinates: 41°54′43″N 87°37′53″W
- Type: History Museum
- Visitors: 240,000 (2013)
- President: Michael J. Anderson
- Owner: Chicago Historical Society
- Public transit access: Bus: 22, 36, 37, 72, 73, 151, 156 Chicago 'L': Red — Clark/Division, North/Clybourn; Brown / Purple — Sedgwick
- Website: www.chicagohistory.org

Chicago History Museum is the museum of the Chicago Historical Society (CHS). The CHS was founded in 1856 to study and interpret Chicago's history. The museum and library have been located in Lincoln Park since the 1930s at 1601 North Clark Street at the intersection of North Avenue in the Old Town Triangle neighborhood, where the museum has been expanded several times. Long known as the CHS, the society adopted the name, Chicago History Museum, in September 2006 for its public presence.

== History ==
Much of the Chicago Historical Society's first collection was destroyed in the Great Chicago Fire in 1871, but the museum rose from the ashes like the city. Among its many documents which were lost in the fire was Abraham Lincoln's final draft of the Emancipation Proclamation. (This draft had been donated by Lincoln to nurse Mary Livermore for her to auction to raise funds to build Chicago's Civil War Soldiers' Home) After the fire, the Society began collecting new materials, which were stored in a building owned by J. Young Scammon, a prominent lawyer and member of the society. However, the building and the new collection were again destroyed by fire in 1874. The Chicago Historical Society built a fireproof building on its pre-1871 building-site at 632 North Dearborn Street. The replacement building opened in 1896 and housed the society for thirty-six years. The building was later added to the National Register of Historic Places as the Old Chicago Historical Society Building.

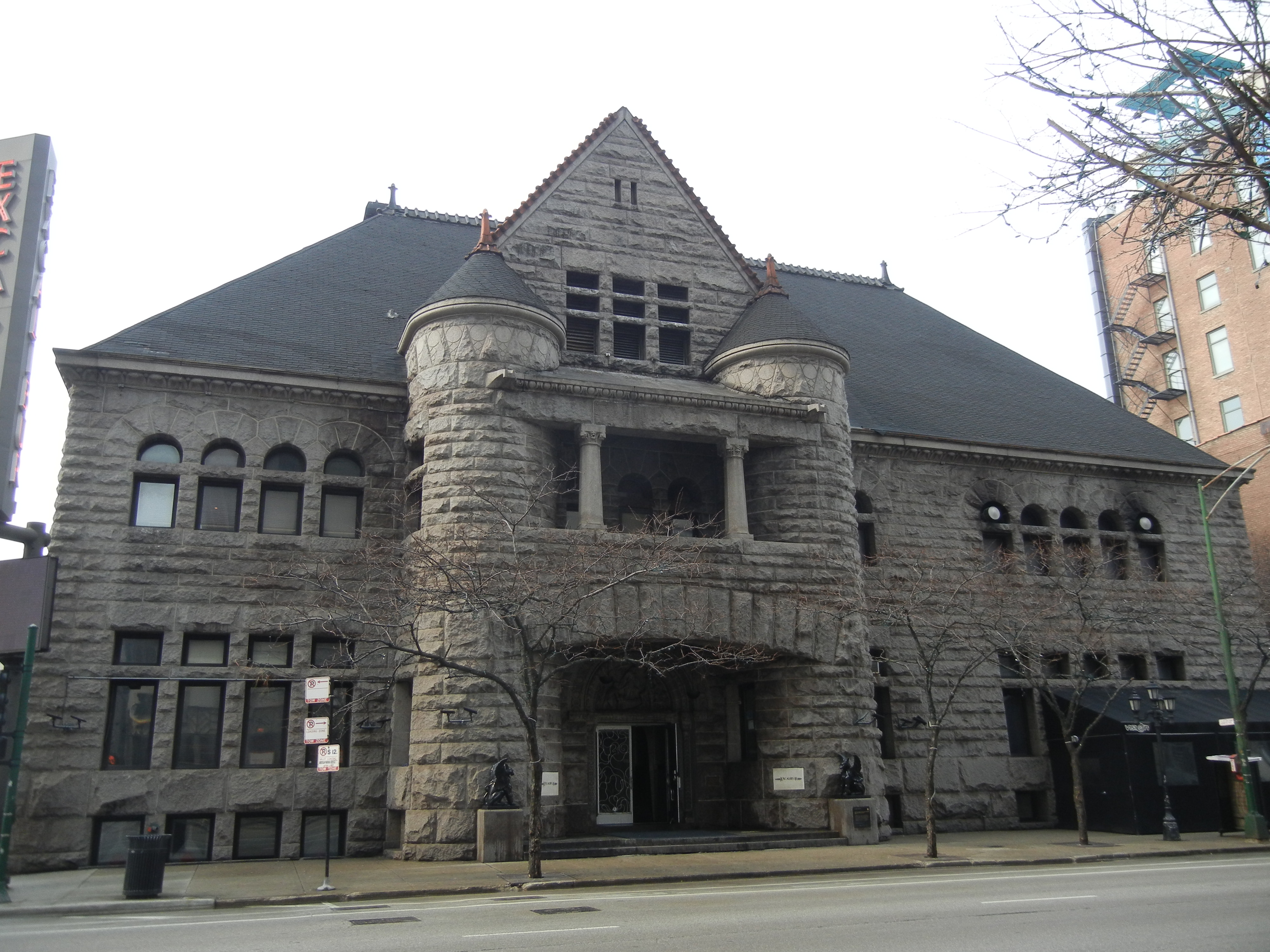
1896–1932 home of the Chicago Historical Society.

Charles F. Gunther, was a prominent Chicago collector who donated several items to the Chicago Historical Society. In 1920, the society paid $150,000 for the remainder of the large historical collection from his estate, with the intention of changing its focus from merely a research institution to a public museum. Many of the items in Gunther's collection, in addition to being related to Chicago, were related to Abraham Lincoln (Note: In 1861, the society had awarded its first honorary membership to Abraham Lincoln.) and the American Civil War. These include Lincoln's deathbed, several other pieces of furniture from the room where he died in the Petersen House, and clothing that he and his wife Mary Todd Lincoln allegedly wore the evening of his assassination.The collection also contains the table on which General Robert E. Lee signed his 1865 surrender to General Ulysses S. Grant, an official act that ended the American Civil War, at the McLean House in Appomattox, Virginia. Shortly after buying the Gunther estate, the society began building a $1 million museum to display its expanded collection. The building opened in 1932 at Clark Street and North Avenue, and is currently known as the Chicago History Museum.

In 2010, the museum was inducted into the Chicago Gay and Lesbian Hall of Fame.

== Building ==
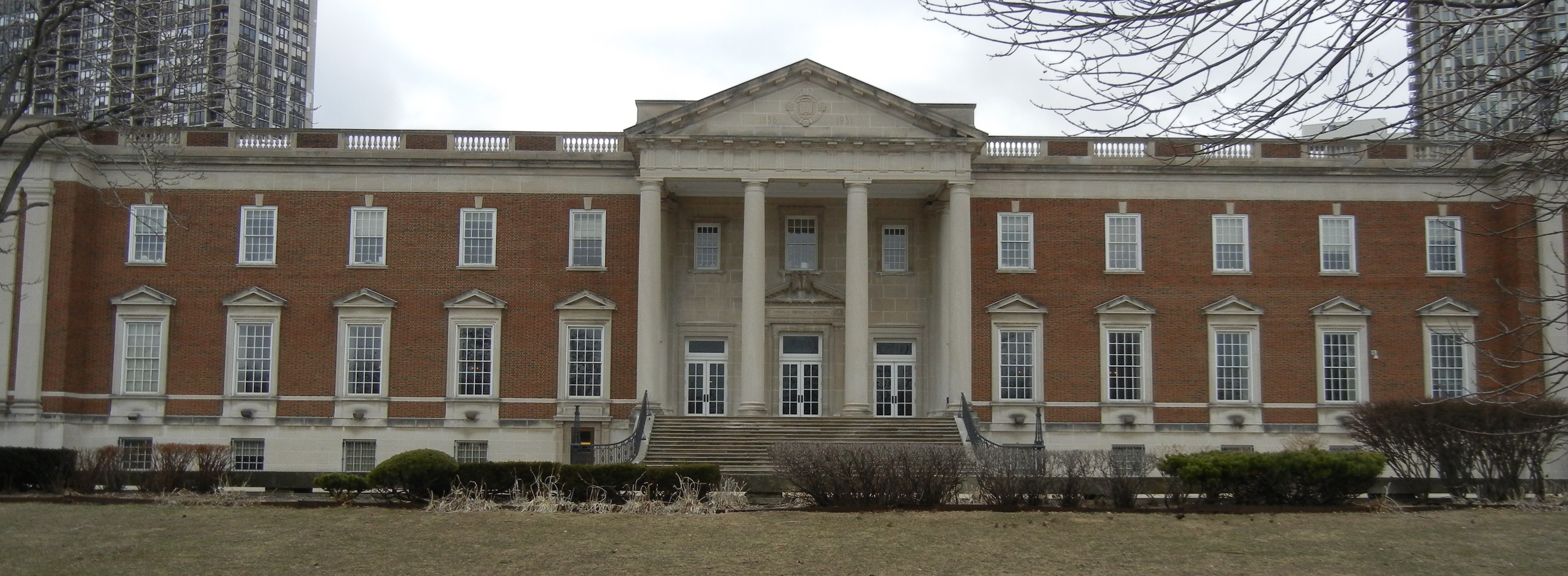
East facade of the museum (built 1932)

After 36 years in the Henry Ives Cobb structure on North Dearborn Street, the museum and library moved to the current complex in Lincoln Park. The oldest part of the museum, designed by Graham, Anderson, Probst & White, was built in 1932 by the WPA, with the aim of creating expanded public exhibition space.

The 1932 Federal-style structure has been expanded twice. The first addition, clad in limestone, opened in 1972 and was designed by Alfred Shaw and Associates. The second addition, designed by Holabird and Root, was done in 1988 and included refacing the earlier expansion in red brick to give a unified look to all three portions of the building. Both expansions occurred on the west side of the 1932 structure, leaving intact its original porticoed entrance facing Lincoln Park. The main entrance and reception hall, however, were moved to the new western addition facing Clark street. The modernist 1988 extension, in addition to expanded exhibition galleries, also contains the museum's store and public cafe.

== Activities ==
The museum explores both Chicago and American history. Exhibitions draw primarily on the museum's own collection, which numbers approximately 22 million holdings. Chicago: Crossroads of America is a 16,000-square-foot space that explores the city's development and its relationship to and influence on American history. Nearly 600 objects document the people and events of the past 200 years. Facing Freedom focuses on eight American conflicts over freedom from the 1850s to the 1970s. The Abraham Lincoln alcoves highlight the sixteenth president's election, his leadership during the Civil War, and his assassination. The adjoining Portrait Gallery features an installation on Chicago during the time of Lincoln. The Sensing Chicago exhibition invites children to use their senses to discover the past. The lobby displays various museum treasures. The newly restored dioramas are housed in the Tawani Foundation Diorama Hall. The Chicago dioramas feature Chicago's rise from a desolate frontier outpost to the bustling city that hosted the World's Columbian Exposition of 1893. The Chicago Room, which overlooks the plaza in Lincoln Park behind the museum building, displays a collection of stained glass and is available to rent for corporate events, meetings or wedding receptions.

Temporary exhibitions feature objects and artifacts from the collection, covering everything from Chicago art to the history of lesbian, gay, bisexual, and transgender Chicagoans to the city's fashion history. On October 14, 2013, the Chicago History Museum announced a project asking the public to furnish ideas for a future exhibition and reducing the most-often-submitted ideas to one assignment through a series of public votes. According to the American Alliance of Museums, this is the first crowdsourcing project allowing the public to give an exhibition assignment to an American museum.

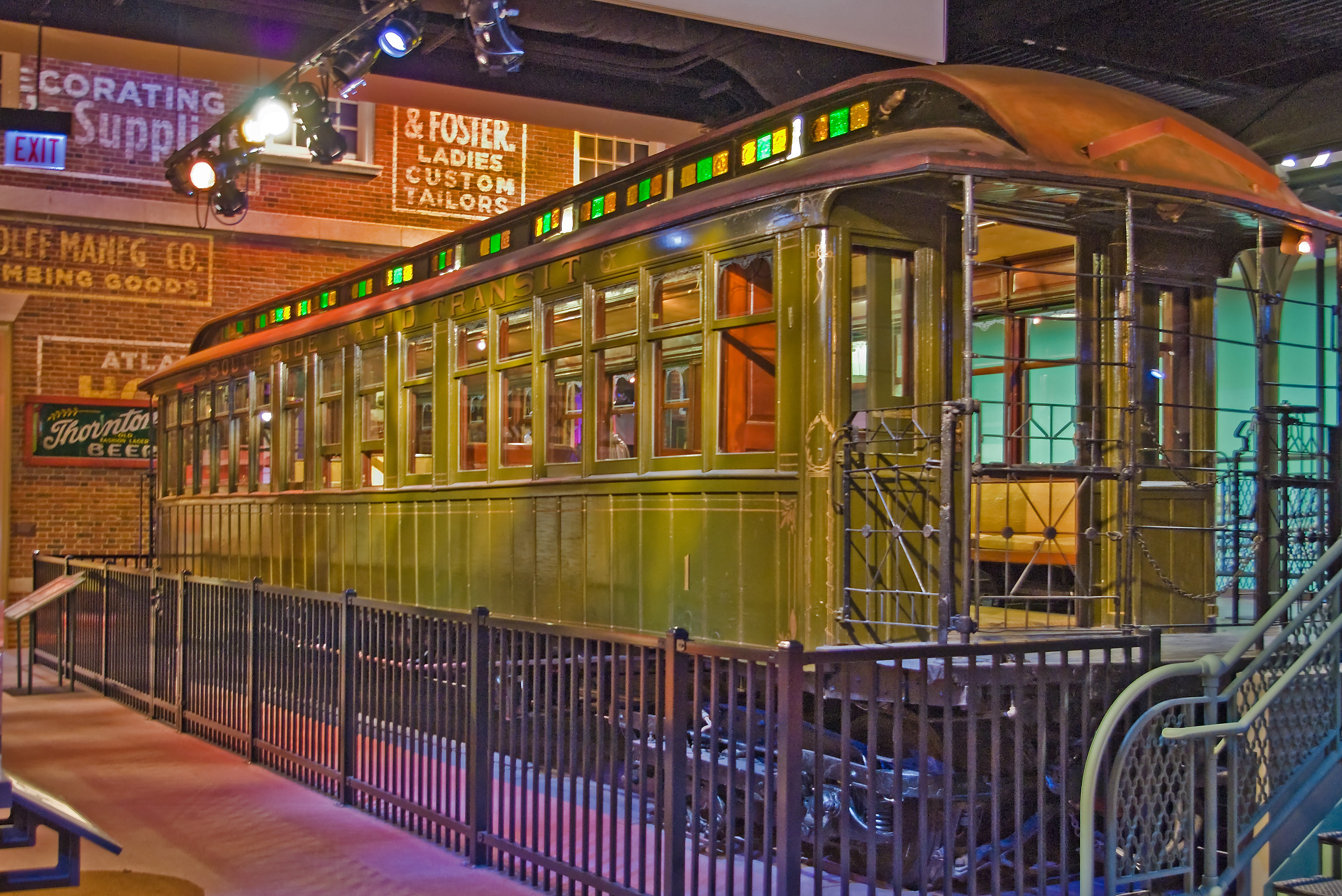
South Side Elevated Railroad car 1.

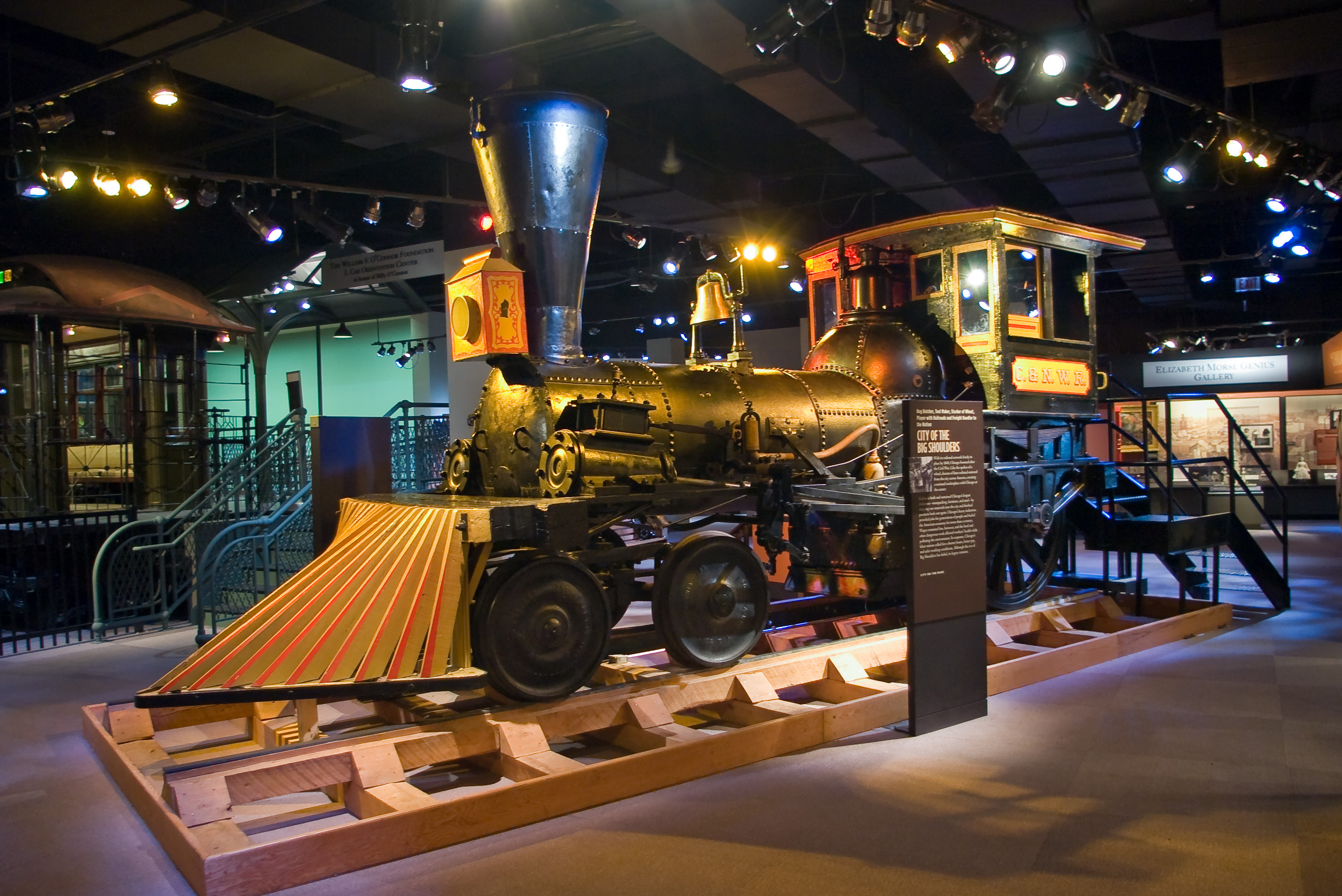
Pioneer, the first locomotive to operate in Chicago.

On January 19, 2006, the first passenger car to operate on the Chicago 'L' system in 1893 was transported to its new display location at the Chicago History Museum. Passengers could ride the 1893 'L' from the Loop to Hyde Park station for 5 cents to attend the World's Columbian Exposition upon the line's opening. The vehicle, known as L Car #1, was cosmetically restored to its 1893 appearance before being transported to the museum where it was lifted into an opening created through a wall on the museum's second floor. The car's interior features include mahogany and rattan seats and etched glass windows. The L car joined the Pioneer, the first locomotive to operate in Chicago; a redesigned exhibition space to showcase the car and locomotive opened on September 30, 2006, as part of a larger remodeling project.

The museum houses Chicago's most important collection of materials related to local history. The extensive research library includes books and other published materials, manuscripts, paintings, sculptures, and photos. It is open to the public, including students working on school projects. The costume collection numbers more than 50,000 pieces and dates from the 18th century to the present. It contains numerous couture pieces, items created by well-known Chicago manufacturers and designers, and garments worn by notable residents.

The museum offers a variety of programs, publications, and online resources related to Chicago and American history. This includes print and online editions of its collaborative effort the Encyclopedia of Chicago. The museum's Chicago Fire mobile app has content equivalent to a 400-page book with more than 350 illustrations, drawn from the museum's collection. The app also offers of 10 distinct Chicago areas and 54 fire-related landmarks. The app uses GPS guidance that helps the user view photos of nearby sites from the era of the Great Chicago Fire. The museum also publishes Chicago History magazine. Written by historians and heavily illustrated, this publication focuses on Chicago's complex past and the people who have shaped it. Additionally, more than 50,000 images from its collection have been digitized as part of Explore Chicago Collections.

Every year, the Chicago History Museum recognizes important Chicagoans and Chicago organizations with its Making History Awards.

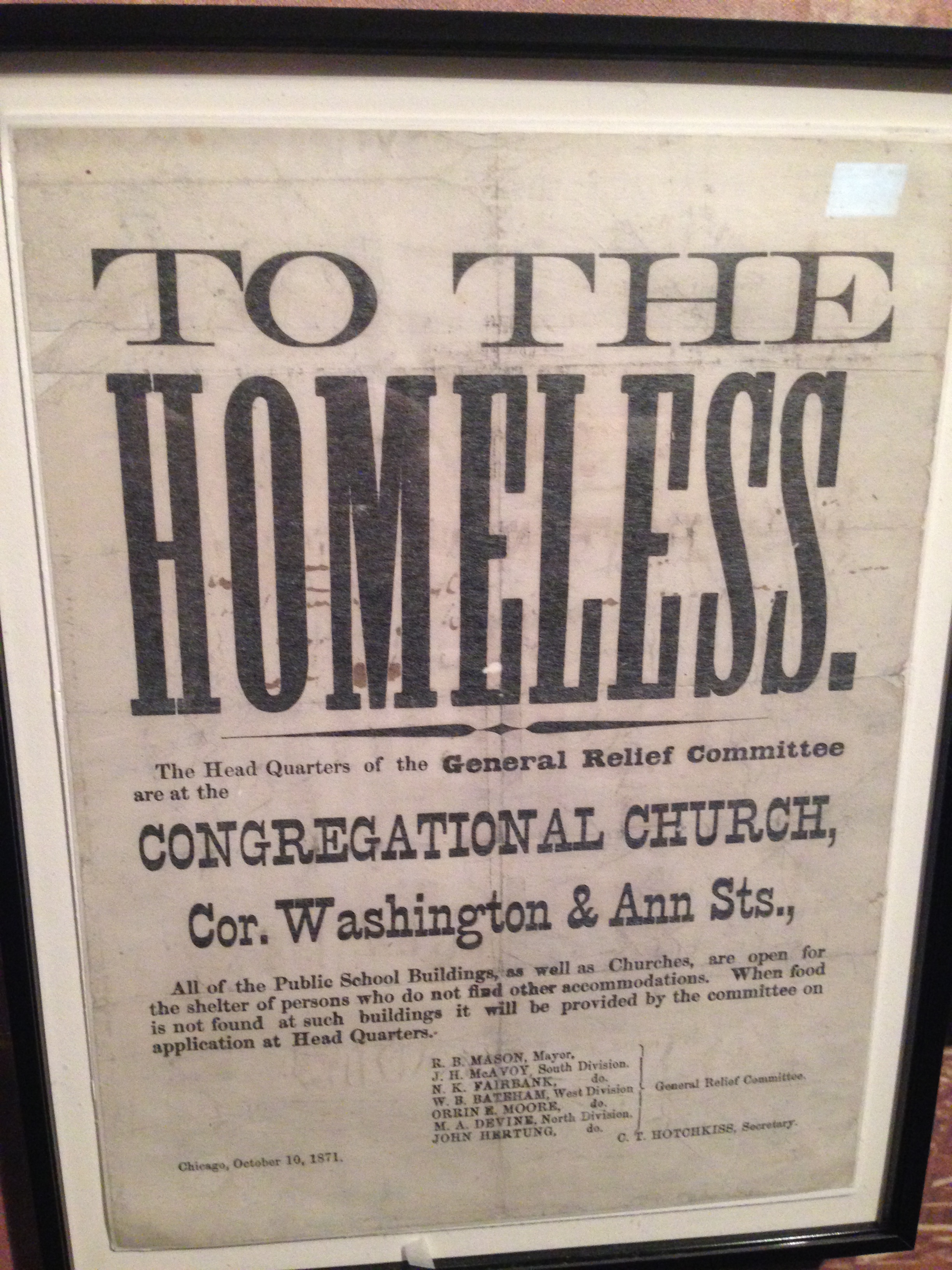
A broadside from the collection that circulated after the Great Chicago Fire.

== Publications ==
Publications are at The Online Books Page and HathiTrust including Proceedings and Chicago History, which resulted in Chicago Times magazine.

== See also ==
- List of museums and cultural institutions in Chicago
- List of historical societies in Illinois
