= JoAnn Elam =

JoAnn Elam (April 20, 1949 – June 25, 2009) was a Chicago-based experimental independent filmmaker. Her films explored socio-political topics, from feminism to working-class struggles. During the 1970s and '80's, Elam became a central figure in the experimental film scene of Chicago. She is best known for the films Rape (1975) and Lie Back and Enjoy It (1982), which can be accredited in part to their continuous distribution from Canyon Cinema. Other notable works include documentaries and short films, such as the unfinished Everyday People (1979–1990). The majority of her work was filmed on small gauge, home movie formats (8mm and Super 8mm), which she has advocated as political decision because it not only increased intimacy with subjects but was more affordable and accessible, and appropriate for small-scale viewing. In her own words, "Small gauge is not larger than life, it's part of life."

While living in San Francisco, California, and Yellow Springs, Ohio, where she attended Antioch College, Elam had completed several documentary films on what she called "everyday life". These films and her other films were produced on 16mm and 8mm films, but mainly 8mm.

Elam's films Rape and Everyday People have been subjects of great interest. Rape gave women a platform to articulate and express anger about their experiences with sexual assault, and they are portrayed without the typical diffusion through "titillation or pathos". Everyday People has been of interest to art and film communities because of its incomplete state and the insight into the postal service, where she worked as a letter carrier.

== Personal life ==
JoAnn Elam was born April 20, 1949, to James Elam (physician) and Elinor Elam. Elam was one of eight children. Elam's father was a well known physician and respiratory researcher who developed the method of rescue breathing, or CPR. Her mother Elinor was what Elam called a "practical activist." She served on the Chicago Jobs Committee, was a member of the Chicago League of Women Voters for more than 40 years and was president from 1972 to 1977, founded and was president of the Child Care Center at South Shore United Methodists Church, and has accomplished much more. Elam's first husband Bill Brand, whom she met at Antioch College, was also a filmmaker. She was also married to Joe Hendrix, whom she met through her fellow employees at the US Post Office. On June 25, 2009, Elam died due to cancer.

== Career ==
After graduating high school, Elam lived in Yellow Springs, Ohio, where she attended Antioch College for a year before deciding that she would not pursue a degree. Elam decided to stay in Yellow Springs because she found an interest in the progressive, political atmosphere of the community surrounding the university. While in Ohio, Elam met her first husband, Bill Brand, who also studied at Antioch. While Brand worked with and for film teacher Paul Sharits, Elam began working with 8mm films. During the late 1960s Elam began traveling, and in 1967 she went to spend a summer in San Francisco, California. Elam didn't have a residence in San Francisco, so she took shelter at friends' places and sometimes slept on the streets. She supported herself by selling and trading knitted clothing she made.

=== Experimental film and The Film Group ===
When Brand graduated from Antioch, he and Elam moved to Chicago so Brand could attend the School of the Art Institute of Chicago (SAIC) and receive his MFA. While being around the community at SAIC, Elam became very involved with the experimental film community that was a product of the film department. She befriended Saul Levine, Coleen Fitzgibbon, Marjorie Keller and many others while being involved at SAIC. Elam also spent much of her time attending lectures about experimental film artists.

Since 8mm film became outdated with the distribution of Super-8mm film, it also became cheaper and was easier to use for Elam who didn't have the proper settings for the use of other film types. 8mm film became popular among the experimental film community and the scene grew and formed an aesthetic characteristic with the use of this cheaper, readily accessible tool. Elam used this to her advantage and began experimenting with the medium and documenting her everyday life in Chicago. Finally, with Bill Brand and their friends Warner Wada and Dan O'Chiva, the four formed the Film Group, now Chicago Filmmakers. The Film Group focused on exhibiting experimental films made by local Chicago filmmakers. While exhibiting these films, the group was also focused on having the artist present to discuss the work after the screenings. Elam became heavily involved because she was left with the tasks of organizing the everyday activities of the organization and she handled all the financial aspects of the organizations.

== Films ==
=== Rape (1975) ===
Described by Ruby Rich as "an early classic of feminist avant-garde agitprop", Rape places three women, all rape victims, and the filmmaker, Elam, in a domestic space, one woman's living room. The 35-minute B&W 16mm film depicts the women angrily discussing the physical, emotional, and intellectual turmoil the experience has given them. The film gives the women the ability to speak out about what they have endured and it gives them the power needed to address the issue in a wider social context.

Mainly viewed in educational settings, the film has been a subject of discourse in universities and in feminist film criticism. One review by Vickie Leonard explained how the film acted as if there was a war between men and women and men use rape as a weapon against women. Leonard also states that "'Rape' looks at its subject straight on. It does not flinch or prettify." Peter Steven explained that the film pushed the boundary by encompassing the social change that was seen in the U.S. between men and women and the ideas of gender and sexuality in documentary film.

The film was meant to leave viewers with a reason to discuss rape as a larger issue. By ending the film with an intertitle that flashed and disappeared too quickly to read, it leaves viewers to discuss what should be done about rape but also leaves them to discuss the reason why it should be spoken about. The women in the film also become an item of discussion because they are also political activists that are involved with anti-rape organizations, and as stated in Issues in Feminist Film Criticism, the women in the anti-rape organizations "all saw the making of this film as an explicitly public act."

=== Lie Back and Enjoy It (1982) ===
This 8-minute B&W 16mm dialectical film explores the broader representation of women in the film industry, conjuring "male-gaze" theory. The soundtrack, which guides the moving images, consists of a dialogue between a man's voice and a woman's voice. The man, a filmmaker, wants to shoot a film on his relationship to the woman, but the woman is skeptical and the conversation evolves into a broader criticism of female representation and their lack of autonomy under patriarchy. Each voice represents a political position, giving the film a didactic tone. Where the man simply wants to express and portray himself without broader political regard, the woman argues that there is a power dynamic between the person behind the camera and the subject, and that it would be irresponsible to ignore it. The visual track portrays technologically modified videos of women with occasional conceptually relevant printed titles, revealing Elam's stance on the issue at hand.

=== Everyday People (1979-1990) ===
Everyday People is a short, experimental documentary film focusing on the lives and struggles of mail carriers in Chicago and their relations with their communities. In 1973, while Elam was co-founding The Film Group, she also started working as a mail carrier for the United States Post Office in Logan Square in Chicago. She quickly became an involved figure in the labor movement and served as a union delegate several times at the National Association of Letter Carriers biennial convention. This involvement is reflected in several of her works, which document tension and protests on behalf of the Post Office workers union.

Everyday People became a work that interested many because of its unfinished state and Elam's insight to the postal service. Writer-in-residence at Art21, Beth Capper, stated that, "the film itself exists in 250 fragments of film, video, and audio elements, and some rough edits, that Elam was consistently working on between 1979 and 1990." Elam kept the focus on the documentary aspect of filmmaking but still focusing on her everyday life in Chicago, as she began working at the US Post Office in 1973.

In making the film, Elam explored "what it meant to represent 'everyday people'" as Capper explained. Elam wanted to breakaway from the representations of the working class by "avant-garde" film. Capper goes on to state that Elam also explored the dynamics within working class structures. However, Elam stayed close to her main focus on gender issues and feminism by stating in her notes on this work that, "the narrators of the film are black, Puerto Rican, and/or women. These groups are under-represented within organized carriers, which are dominated by Irish, Italian and German men. Because of the choice of narrators, issues of racism and sexism are often brought out." Elam had a plan to construct the film from her ideologies in feminism but also present new ideas about the working class and the postal service through the film.
