= American Revolution 2 =

- Directed by: Howard Alk
- Produced by: Mike Gray
- Release date: 1969
- Country: United States
- Language: English

American Revolution 2 is a 1969 documentary on the 1968 Democratic National Convention and its aftermath. Part of the film focuses on the creation of an alliance between the Young Patriots Organization and local Black Panthers. On its release Roger Ebert gave the film four stars, while The New York Times reviewer Roger Greenspun was more critical. The film was released on DVD in 2007 (along with its follow-up The Murder of Fred Hampton) and received generally positive reviews.

The film was directed by Howard Alk and produced by Mike Gray. Ebert writes that the film was created as a collective effort by the Film Group, a local company that generally made commercials, and released without any individual credits. It has no narrator.

== See also ==
- List of American films of 1969
