= Howard Alk =

American film director (1930–1982)

Howard Alk (October 25, 1930 – January 1982) was an American filmmaker based in Chicago, Illinois, and an original co-founder of The Second City theater troupe. In the 1960s he began to work in film with the Chicago Film Group, filming and directing documentaries, completing American Revolution 2 (1969) and The Murder of Fred Hampton (1971). He also collaborated for years with singer/songwriter Bob Dylan, producing films with him through 1981.

== Early life and education ==
Born and raised in Chicago, Howard Alk attended local public schools. An advanced student, he enrolled in the University of Chicago at the age of 14; under the presidency and chancellery of Robert Maynard Hutchins, students could enroll in a Great Books-oriented interdisciplinary undergraduate program contingent on the passage of an entrance test and sophomore standing in high school, a requirement that may have been waived for Alk. Many students were placed in advanced classes on the basis of placement tests and could accelerate their studies by taking subject tests at their convenience, often completing the degree in as little as two years. He was a member of the student-run Compass Players cabaret troupe, with Elaine May and Mike Nichols.

== Career ==
After the troupe disbanded, Alk joined fellow Compass players and University of Chicago graduates Paul Sills and Bernie Sahlins as a co-founder of The Second City. They developed this theater troupe, based on improvisation, from Viola Spolin's theatre games. Alk had previously worked with Spolin's son, Sills, at the Gate of Horn.

According to Sahlins' 2001 autobiography, Days and Nights at the Second City, Alk coined the troupe's name. He is also credited with coining a definition of a Freudian slip as "meaning to say one thing and saying a mother."

Alk left The Second City in the early 1960s for other projects. He became associated with The Film Group, a Chicago film production company, where he shot and edited several of the group's films, including American Revolution 2 (1969) and The Murder of Fred Hampton (1971), both of which he directed.

Alk was a longtime friend and collaborator of singer/songwriter Bob Dylan. In 1962, Dylan had performed as the first act at Alk's club, the Bear. Alk accompanied Dylan "on tour, shooting footage, editing, taking photographs—and assisting on the classic Dont Look Back, as well as Eat the Document, Hard Rain, and Renaldo and Clara, all made and released through 1978. In the late 1970s and early 1980s, he resided at Dylan's Point Dume estate in Malibu, California. Although Hard Rain and Renaldo and Clara were released to diffident critical and commercial receptions, Dylan continued to retain Alk as a filmmaker and photographer on various projects (including several filmed concerts on the 1981 World Tour) until his death.

Alk also worked on Janis, Festival, Luxman Baul's Movie and other films.

== Death ==
Alk regularly used heroin. On January 1 or 3, 1982, (Note: Heylin states that Alk was found dead on New Year's Day 1982, but Sounes notes that he was found on January 3, 1982.) he was found dead at Rundown Studios, Dylan's studio in Santa Monica, California. Although the coroner ruled his death an accidental heroin overdose, other sources report his death as a suicide. Although Alk's first wife, Jones, and his second wife, Joan, both expressed their belief that he had intentionally killed himself, no corroborating evidence has ever been found.

Alk was survived by his parents Rozetta and Lou, his wife Joan, and their young son Jesse Alk.

== Films ==
- The Cry of Jazz (1959) -- editor
- And This is Free (1964) -- editor
- Dont Look Back (1967) -- assistant director
- Festival—editor
- You Are What You Eat (1968) -- editor
- American Revolution 2 (1969) -- director
- The Murder of Fred Hampton (1971) -- director
- Eat the Document (1972) -- cinematographer, editor
- Janis (1974) -- director
- My Friend Vince (1975) -- cinematographer, editor
- Hard Rain (1976) -- cinematographer, editor
- Renaldo and Clara (1978) -- cinematographer, editor
