= Janis (film) =

- Directed by: Howard Alk
- Written by: Howard Alk, Seaton Findlay
- Starring: Janis Joplin
- Cinematography: Michael Wadleigh, D. A. Pennebaker (additional)
- Distributed by: Universal Pictures
- Release date: October 18, 1974
- Running time: 96 minutes
- Countries: United States; Canada
- Language: English

Janis is a 1974 Canadian-American documentary film about the rock singer Janis Joplin. The film was directed by Howard Alk with much assistance from Albert Grossman, Joplin's manager. It was available on videocassette in the United States in the 1980s and 1990s, but DVD versions have been released only in France, Belgium and the Netherlands. In late 2011, it was added to Hulu's movie collection for online viewing. Part of the film soundtrack is included on the 1975 album Janis.

== Summary ==
The film consists entirely of archival footage of Joplin. It includes rehearsals, her June 25, 1970 appearance on The Dick Cavett Show, footage from her Woodstock performance in 1969 (dancing with her band's saxophone player during an instrumental break), and another television segment videotaped in black & white in April 1967 before she became famous.

Much screen time is devoted to Joplin's 1969 European tour, including an interview with Joplin during her stay in Stockholm and the ecstatic reaction of a clean-cut female fan in Frankfurt when she sees Joplin through the window of her tour bus before the concert starts. (The American fan, who reveals on camera that she is the wife of a U.S. Army officer stationed in Germany, is later seen with several German youths dancing on stage with Joplin.)

== Production ==
Laura Joplin, the star's younger sister who contributed to the hit off-Broadway play Love, Janis (which was based on Laura's book of the same name), is seen and heard talking to Janis in television news footage from the ten-year reunion of Thomas Jefferson High School's class of 1960. Janis had graduated with the 1960 class of this high school in Port Arthur, Texas. The reunion, at which she gave a long press conference that is included in the film, took place in August 1970 at the Goodhue Hotel in Port Arthur. The hotel was demolished in 1990.

Though 1974 is listed as the year of the film's release to cinemas and its copyright year, a Washington Post review indicates that DC-area moviegoers had their first chance to see it in March 1975. Post critic Tom Zito opined that the film's total lack of narration and a dearth of captions, with all the talking done during Joplin's lifetime, made it tedious. He said he felt uncomfortable that not only do viewers never see a connection between her deteriorating physical appearance and her death, but also that no one who worked on the film communicated to viewers that she is dead.

This film remains a major source of footage for basic and premium cable TV documentaries about Joplin—projects that do include narration and sound bite interviews with those who knew Joplin. When documentaries include film clips of Joplin at her 1970 high school reunion, the 1974 documentary Janis is the source. Color film of an eloquent interview with Joplin in London in 1969 (outdoors with the sounds of car engines) also originates from Janis. That interview was done very shortly before or after concerts she gave at Albert Hall. If film of any of the concerts themselves exists, it has stayed in a vault since 1969.

== Release ==
Universal Films distributed Janis in the United States, but only released it in one theatre in San Francisco for fourteen weeks. F. R. Crawley stated that Universal shelved the film in order to focus on larger films such as Jaws.

== Accolades ==
The film was nominated for a Golden Globe Award for Best Documentary Film in 1974, and was the winner of the Canadian Film Award for Best Theatrical Documentary at the 26th Canadian Film Awards in 1975.

== Works cited ==
- Pendakur, Manjunath (1990). Canadian Dreams & American Control: The Political Economy of the Canadian Film Industry. Garamond Press. ISBN 0920059937.
