= Millie Goldsholl =

American film producer (1920–2012)

- Born: May 22, 1920
- Died: May 23, 2012 (aged 92); Lincolnshire, Illinois, U.S.
- Occupation: Film producer
- Notable work: Up is Down

Millie Goldsholl (May 22, 1920 – May 23, 2012) is most well known for running the film division of the Chicago graphic design firm, Morton Goldsholl Associates (Goldsholl Design & Film Associates). She also made her own films and animations, including the award-winning Up is Down from 1969.

Millie Goldsholl grew up in Freeport, New York on the south shores of Long Island. As a child she developed a love for pastoral life and art, creating elaborate chalk drawings of her family and grandparents' farm animals outside her family's home. Millie moved from the sidewalk to the easel when she entered high school. Here, encouraging art teachers inspired Millie to make a career out of her passion for art. Millie moved to Chicago, Illinois when she was sixteen with her sister and widowed mother. They moved in with Millie's brother, who had recently acquired a factory job and needed help around the house. After failing to enroll in art classes that required too many prerequisites, Millie joined her brother in the factory.

Millie entered the design world through her husband, Morton (Mort) Goldsholl, who invited Millie to enter the world of advertising alongside him. The two met at work, a paper box manufacturer where Millie did accounting and Mort designed packaging. Mort kept his day job as a freelance designer and encouraged Millie to enter the newly formed IIT Institute of Design, the first school in Chicago to offer a design degree. Millie ultimately studied architecture, but the school's Bauhaus inspired environment encouraged her to experiment with different materials, mediums and machines. It is here where she was first introduced to filmmaking, and where she developed a lifelong connection to László Moholy-Nagy's vision of industry, art and design.

In 1955, Mort and Millie Goldsholl established Goldsholl Design & Film Associates. Mort took responsibility for the design division, while Millie took charge of building a film division. Their Northfield, Illinois studio reflected the flexibility and freedom of the Bauhaus tradition, combining traditional graphic design work alongside a filmmaking studio. Millie compared the studio to a beehive, but noted the proximity led to collaborations and experiments that wouldn't have happened any other way. “We are involved here in every step of the film process, from idea to imagery,” Millie told Rhodes Patterson shortly after moving in, “and we find this maintains the integrity of the concept. Phonics can be manipulated with the same freedom as image. The auditory is mobilized to create mood. Images may be heard, and sound seen. It is not so much in the components of the film structure that its art resides, but rather in relationships, interaction and transitions that it assumes its significance. The pulse or rhythm of a film can produce tension, excitement and release,” she continued. “In editing, the filmmaker gives wings to the parts . . . cleaving them from their place in time and space . . . releasing them into a designer's stratosphere––there to be juggled, taken, rejected, extended, clipped, superimposed and recomposed.”

In addition to her Goldsholl Design Associates firm work, Millie made a handful of films on her own, including the award-winning animation, Up is Down (1969). This short film looks at a study of an unconventional, young boy who is temporarily persuaded to accept others' viewpoints as his own. Millie, who dedicated the film to Martin Luther King, considered herself a maverick like the young boy who walks on his hands in the animated film. She once stated, "It is better to be utopic than myopic – even if you're not a designer – and especially if you are. It's not so much a matter of thinking big as thinking deep."

Millie died in May 2012, preceded by Mort in 1995. Mort and Millie are survived by their two children, Harry Goldsholl, and Gleda Dreke, as well as their grandchildren: Jesse Goldsholl, Jake Goldsholl, Rebecca Dreke, RD Dreke, and Emily Dreke.

Since 2006, Millie and Mort Goldsholl's films have been in the care of Chicago Film Archives (CFA). CFA's Mort & Millie Goldsholl Collection contains commercials and industrial films that Goldsholl Design & Film Associates made for their clients as well as experimental films and animations made by both Morton and Millie, unedited travel films shot by Morton and Millie and films that the two collected over the years.
