= The Murder of Fred Hampton =

1971 documentary film

- Home media release cover
- Directed by: Howard Alk
- Produced by: Mike Gray
- Starring: Fred Hampton; Rennie Davis; Edward Hanrahan; Bobby Rush
- Cinematography: Howard Alk; Mike Gray
- Edited by: Howard Alk; John Mason
- Distributed by: Facets Multi-Media; Chicago Film Group, MGA Inc
- Release date: May 1971
- Running time: 88 minutes
- Country: United States
- Language: English

The Murder of Fred Hampton is a 1971 American documentary film about the short life and death of Fred Hampton, a young African-American civil rights activist in Chicago and leader of the Illinois Black Panther Party. During the film's production, Hampton was fatally shot on December 4, 1969, in a pre-dawn raid at his apartment by the Chicago Police Department. The raid was revealed to have been organized in cooperation with the FBI.

When they learned of Hampton's death, filmmakers Howard Alk and Mike Gray, director and producer, respectively, went to his apartment, which was still unsecured. They took film footage of the crime scene. They later used this to challenge news reports and police testimony about the events. They also conducted investigative reporting into Hampton's death, with related material included in the film. Their conclusion is expressed in the title.

In 2021, the film was selected for preservation in the United States National Film Registry by the Library of Congress as being "culturally, historically, or aesthetically significant".

== Synopsis ==
The documentary is split into two parts: a portrait of Fred Hampton and an investigative report into his death in the police raid. Through re-enactments, evidence from the scene, and interviews, the documentary argues that Hampton was murdered, in an assassination by the Chicago police.

== Cast ==
- Fred Hampton
- Rennie Davis
- Edward Hanrahan, Cook's County State's Attorney
- Don Matuson
- Bobby Rush

== Release ==
The film was released in Chicago, Illinois in May 1971, but it failed to attract much attention. It had a successful festival run in Europe and opened in New York City in October 1971.

== Reception ==
In retrospective reviews in the early 21st century, David Walker of DVD Talk rated it 4.5/5 stars and wrote,

"As a documentary, The Murder of Fred Hampton serves as a lasting memorial to Hampton's great legacy and tragic killing. Equally important, the film is an example of the power of independent media in providing the truth, when much of the mainstream media simply chooses to recycle the information they are given without digging beneath the surface."

Roger Ebert described the film as "less compelling as investigative journalism than as an archive of political vernacular." A. H. Weiler of The New York Times called it "a disturbingly somber illustration of some of the ills that beset us and our social system." Spencer Parsons of the Austin Chronicle wrote that the film's coverage of Hampton is riveting and does not shy away from controversy. Noel Murray of The A.V. Club rated it B+ and called it an immersive experience and "more satisfying portrait of activism" than American Revolution 2 (1969), which Alk also directed.

== See also ==
- List of American films of 1971
