= Morton Goldsholl Associates =

Advertising agency

- Staff of Morton Goldsholl Associates in 1963
- Industry: Graphic design Advertising agency
- Founded: 1955; 71 years ago
- Founders: Morton Goldsholl; Millie Goldsholl
- Defunct: 1990s
- Headquarters: Chicago, Illinois, United States
- Number of employees: 30 (1963)

Morton Goldsholl Associates (Goldsholl Associates, Goldsholl Design & Film Associates) was one of Chicago’s leading graphic design studios in the 1950s through 1970s. The studio became recognized for their animated films, progressive hiring practices and developing corporate branding packages for various companies.

In 1955, Morton (Mort) and Millie Goldsholl established Goldsholl Design & Film Associates. Mort became titular head with responsibility for the design division, while Millie took charge of building a film division. By 1963, the company had grown to about 30 employees. Due to staff growth and an interest in expanding the film division, the Goldsholls built a spare office building on a frontage road in Northfield, Illinois, filling it with a stage as well as sound and editing suites for film production to take place alongside the designers.

While at Goldsholl Design & Film Associates, Mort created iconic logos and packaging for Motorola, Vienna Beef, Peace Corps, Alcoa and Brach's Candy, just to name a few. When he was asked what he liked most about his company, Mort Goldsholl said, “I enjoy my work immensely, but seldom the results. The playtime in design is the most joyful experience––the wasted moments in scribbles, dribbles and scratches that formulate vague thoughts into ideas and dreams into action. I don’t know how or why this is so. The problem is to get the final design to match the fleeting idea. The big dreams about the great work of art can too easily be dissipated in the practicalities of solutions, clients, markets, statistics, sales, function and committee decisions."

Former employees of Goldsholl Design & Film Associates include: DeWitt Beall, David Blumenthal, Wayne Boyer, Tom Freese, Larry Janiak, William Langdon, Byron Grush, Paul Jessel, James Logan, Susan Keig, Thomas Miller, Fred Ota, John Weber and John Siena.

The Goldsholls worked together for 40 years until the company closed down in the 1990s. Mort died in 1995, and Millie died on May 23, 2012.

Since 2006, the majority of the films created by Morton Goldsholl Associates have been in the care of Chicago Film Archives (CFA). CFA's Mort & Millie Goldsholl Collection contains approximately 129 films made by the firm. University of Illinois at Chicago Special Collections has 22 linear feet of archival print materials in their Morton Goldsholl Collection.
