= List of alumni of the Second City =

The following are notable writers, performers, stage managers, directors, producers, and musicians who have collaborated on revues at The Second City.

== Alumni of Current Resident Stages ==
=== Chicago Mainstage (1959-present) ===
- 1959 – Howard Alk, Roger Bowen, Severn Darden, Andrew Duncan, Barbara Harris, Mina Kolb, William Mathieu, Sheldon Patinkin, Bernard Sahlins, Paul Sills, Eugene Troobnick
- 1960 – Alan Arkin, Paul Sand, Joyce Sloane
- 1961 – Bill Alton, John Brent, Hamilton Camp, Del Close, Melinda Dillon, Anthony Holland, Zohra Lampert, Alan Myerson, Joan Rivers, Avery Schreiber
- 1962 – Mona Burr, Dennis Cunningham, Dick Schaal
- 1963 – Jack Burns, MacIntyre Dixon, Ann Elder, Judy Elder, Melissa 'Sally' Hart, Richard Libertini, Omar Shapli
- 1964 – Ian Davidson, Eugene Kadish, Fred Kaz, Harv Robbin, David Steinberg
- 1965 – Joan Bassie, Robert Benedetti, Alex Canaan, Sondra Caron, Josephine Forsberg, Judy Graubart, Robert Klein, David Paulsen, Fred Willard
- 1966 – Bob Curry, Sid Grossfeld, Sandy Holt, Jon Shank, David Walsh, Penny White
- 1967 – J.J. Barry, Peter Boyle, Martin Harvey Friedberg, Burt Heyman, Lynne Lipton, Ira Miller
- 1968 – Murphy Dunne, Michael Miller, Carol Robinson
- 1969 – David Blum, Martin de Maat, Jim Fisher, Joe Flaherty, Nate Herman, Pamela Hoffman, Roberta Maguire, Judy Morgan, Brian Doyle-Murray, Harold Ramis, Eric Ross, Cyril Simon, Paul Taylor
- 1971 – John Belushi, Eugenie Ross-Leming, Dan Ziskie
- 1972 – Dave Rasche, Ann Ryerson
- 1973 – John Candy, Stephanie Cotsirilos, Tino Insana, Bill Murray, Jim Staahl, Betty Thomas
- 1974 – Dan Aykroyd, Cassandra Danz, Don DePollo, Michael J. Gellman, Allan Guttman, Deborah Harmon, Richard Kurtzman, Eugene Levy, Raul Moncada, Rosemary Radcliffe, Gilda Radner, Mert Rich, Doug Steckler, Dave Thomas, Paul Zegler
- 1975 – Bernadette Birkett, Miriam Flynn, George Wendt
- 1976 – Will Aldis, Eric Boardman, Steven Kampmann, Shelley Long, Jim Sherman
- 1977 – Cynthia Cavalenes, Larry Coven
- 1978 – James Belushi, Tim Kazurinsky, Audrie Neenan, Lawrence J. Perkins, Maria Ricossa
- 1979 – Danny Breen, Mary Gross, Bruce Jarchow, Nancy McCabe-Kelly
- 1980 – Meagen Fay, Lance Kinsey, Rob Riley
- 1981 – Susan Bugg, John Kapelos, Rick Thomas
- 1982 – Nonie Newton-Breen, Cheryl Sloane, Craig Taylor
- 1983 – Bekka Eaton, Ed Greenberg, Michael Hagerty, Isabella Hofmann, Richard Kind
- 1985 – Andrew Alexander, Mindy Bell, Jim Fay, Mona Lyden, Len Stuart
- 1986 – Dan Castellaneta, Rick Hall, Bonnie Hunt, Maureen Kelly, Harry Murphy
- 1987 – Steve Assad, Kevin Crowley, Aaron Freeman, Ruby Streak, Barbara Wallace, Ron West
- 1988 – Joe Liss, Mike Myers
- 1989 – Chris Farley, Tim Meadows, Joel Murray, David Pasquesi, Judith Scott, Holly Wortell
- 1990 – Tom Gianas, Bob Odenkirk, Tim O'Malley, Jill Talley
- 1991 – Fran Adams, Cynthia Caponera, Steve Carell, Michael McCarthy, John Rubano
- 1992 – Paul Dinello, Kelly Leonard, Ruth Rudnick, Amy Sedaris
- 1993 – Stephen Colbert, David Razowsky
- 1994 – Scott Adsit, Scott Allman, Jackie Hoffman
- 1995 – Rachel Dratch, Jon Glaser, Jenna Jolovitz, Adam McKay
- 1996 – Kevin Dorff, Tina Fey, Mick Napier
- 1997 – Jim Zulevic
- 1998 – Rachel Hamilton, T. J. Jagodowski, Susan Messing, Jeff Richmond, Tami Sagher, Rich Talarico, Stephnie Weir
- 1999 – Rob Bogart, Ed Furman, Beth Kligerman
- 2000 – Craig Cackowski, Sue Gillan, Angela Shelton
- 2001 – Debra Downing, Nyima Funk, Martin Garcia, Michael Kennard, David Pompeii
- 2002 – Brian Boland, Josh Funk, Robin Hammond, Alison Riley, Al Samuels, Abby Sher
- 2003 – Dan Bakkedahl, Lisa Brooke, Liz Cackowski, Antoine McKay, Jean Villepique
- 2004 – Brian Gallivan, Maribeth Monroe, Claudia Michelle Wallace
- 2005 – Matt Craig, Molly Erdman
- 2006 – Joe Canale, Ithamar Enriquez, Kirk Hanley, Marc Warzecha
- 2007 – Matt Hovde, Brad Morris, Amber Ruffin
- 2008 – Lauren Ash, Jim Carlson, Shelly Gossman, Anthony LeBlanc, Michael Patrick O'Brien, Emily Wilson
- 2009 – Andy St. Clair, Diana Martinez
- 2010 – Allison Bills, Tim Mason, Julie Nichols, Sam Richardson, Tim Robinson, Monica Wilson
- 2011 – Edgar Blackmon, Billy Bungeroth, Holly Laurent, Katie Rich, Jeremy Smith, Meghan Teal
- 2012 – Tim Baltz, Mary Sohn, Steve Waltien
- 2013 – Ross Bryant, Tawny Newsome
- 2014 – Ryan Bernier, Jesse Case, Chelsea Devantez, John Hartman, Paul Jurewicz, Mike Kosinski, Jacob Shuda, Daniel Strauss, Christine Tawfik, Emily Walker
- 2015 – Rashawn Nadine Scott, Sarah Shook, Jamison Webb
- 2016 – Shantira Jackson, Kelsey Kinney, Martin Morrow, Vinnie Pillarella, Lesley Stone
- 2017 – Ryan Asher, Tyler Davis, Jen Hoyt, Jeffrey Murdoch, Tien Tran, Nate Varrone
- 2018 – Emma Pope, Kimberly Michelle Vaughn
- 2019 – Mary Catherine Curran, Sarah Dell'Amico, Jaci Entwisle, Nick Gage, Andrew Knox, Dawn Kusinski, Asia Martin, Jordan Savusa, Adam Schreck
- 2021 – Adam Archer, Jeff Bouthiette, Jon Carr, Evan Mills, Anneliese Toft
- 2022 – Andy Bolduc, E.J. Cameron, Jen Ellison, Kiley Fitzgerald, Claire McFadden, Julia Morales, Sara Stock
- 2023 — Carisa Barreca, Ryan Miera, Jordan Stafford, Leila Gorstein, Jeff Griggs, Brittani Yawn, Tim Metzler, Meghan Babbe
- 2024 — Adonis Holmes, Hannah Ingle, Laurel Krabacher, Adisa Williams, Rob Wilson
- 2025 — Leila Gorstein, Bill Letz, Devonte E. Washington
- 2026 — Cat McDonnell, Zoe McKee, Eddie Mujica, Preston Parker, Yazmin Ramos

=== Toronto (1973-present) ===
- 1973 – Dan Aykroyd, Andrew Alexander, Valri Bromfield, Jayne Eastwood, Gino Empry, Joe Flaherty, Fred Kaz, Brian Doyle-Murray, Gilda Radner, Bernard Sahlins, Gerry Salsberg, Sam Shopsowitz, Joyce Sloane
- 1974 – John Candy, Suzette Couture, Todd Jeffrey-Ellis, Piers Gilson, Allan Guttman, Eugene Levy, Catherine O'Hara, Sheldon Patinkin, Jim Patry, Mitchell Gold, Rosemary Radcliffe, Whitney S. Smith
- 1975 – Carol Cassis, Ben Gordon, Andrea Martin, John Monteith, Sharon H. Smith, Dave Thomas
- 1976 – Peter Aykroyd, Brenda Donohue
- 1977 – Del Close, Robin Duke, Steven Kampmann, Robin McCullouch, Martin Short, Dave Thompson, Peter Torokvei
- 1978 – Scott Baker, Sally Cochrane, Cathy Gallant, Len Stuart
- 1979 – Maggie Butterfield, Don DePollo, Don Dickinson, Melissa Ellis, Derek McGrath, Tony Rosato, Kim Sisson, Mary Charlotte Wilcox
- 1980 – Tom Baker, Gabe Cohen, Steve Ehrlick, John Hemphill, Kathleen Laskey, Denise Pidgeon, Wendy Slutsky
- 1981 – Ken Innes, Jerrold Karch, Deborah Kimmett, Jan Randall
- 1982 – Michael J. Gellman, Don Lake
- 1983 – Donald Adams, Bob Derkach, June Graham, Bruce Hunter, Ron James, Madelyn Keane, Debra McGrath, Lyn Okkerse, Bruce Pirrie, Jane Schoettle, Blaine Slekirk, Adrian Truss
- 1984 – Sandra Balcovske, Karen Poce
- 1985 – Dana Andersen, Bob Bainborough, Kevin Frank, Linda Kash, Dorothy Tenute
- 1986 – David Huband, Jeff Michalski, Mike Myers, Deborah Theaker, Mark Wilson
- 1987 – Tamar Malic, Ryan Stiles, Audrey Webb
- 1988 – Neil Crone, Wendy Hopkins, Lindsay Leese, Colin Mochrie, Alana Shields, Tim Sims
- 1989 – Patrick McKenna
- 1990 – Kathryn Greenwood, Karen Hines, Gary Pearson, Ed Sahely
- 1991 – Chris Earle, Nick Johne, Tara Charendoff, Jenny Parsons, Judith Scott, Peter Sherk, Brian Smith
- 1993 – Andrew Currie, Jackie Harris, Steve Morel, Paul O'Sullivan, Jonathan Wilson
- 1994 – Lori Nasso, Janet van de Graaf
- 1995 – Tamara Bick, Kerry Garnier, Albert Howell, Nancy Marino, Teresa Pavlinek
- 1996 – Jennifer Irwin, Mollie Jacques, Bob Martin, Jack Mosshammer
- 1997 – James Carroll, Marc Hickox, Melody Johnson, Arnold Pinnock, Angela V. Shelton
- 1998 – Mark Andrada, Gavin Crawford, Tracy Dawson, Andrew Dollar, Marypat Farrell, Jerry Minor, Doug Morency, Lee Smart, Gina Sorell, Jennifer Whalen
- 1999 – Paul Bates, Lisa Brooke, Kevin Dorff, K. McPherson Jones
- 2000 – Geri Hall, Carolyn Taylor, Sandy Jobin-Bevans
- 2001 – Aurora Browne, Jennifer Goodhue, Paul Constable, Nathan David Shore
- 2002 – Pat Kelly, Matt Baram
- 2003 – Jamillah Ross, Naomi Snieckus
- 2004 – Derek Flores, Rebecca Northan
- 2005 – Anand Rajaram, Lauren Ash, Steven DelBalso, Mick Napier, Klaus Peter Schuller
- 2006 – Jim Annan, Scott Montgomery, Matthew Reid
- 2007 – Marty Adams, Darryl Hinds, Karen Parker, Leslie Seiler
- 2008 – Ashley Botting, Kerry Griffin, Reid Janisse
- 2009 – Rob Baker, Dale Boyer, Adam Cawley, Caitlin Howden
- 2010 – Inessa Frantowski, Kris Siddiqi
- 2011 – Ashley Comeau, Jason DeRosse, Nigel Downer, Alastair Forbes, Carly Heffernan
- 2012 – Christina Cicko, Stacey McGunnigle
- 2013 – Craig Brown, Jan Caruana, Allison Price, Sophie Santerre, Connor Thompson, Kevin Vidal
- 2014 – Sarah Hillier, Etan Muskat, Kevin Whalen
- 2015 – Leigh Cameron, Kyle Dooley, Becky Johnson, Meg Maguire, Kirsten Rasmussen
- 2016 – Roger Bainbridge, Brandon Hackett, Lindsay Mullan, Ann Pornel
- 2017 – Georgia Priestly Brown, Nadine Djoury, Devon Hyland, Colin Munch, Paloma Nuñez, Allana Reoch
- 2018 – Jordan Armstrong, Christine Groom, Jen Hoyt, Sharjil Rasool, Chris Wilson
- 2019 – Tricia Black, Alan Shane Lewis, Natalie Metcalfe, Clare McConnell, Seann Murray, PHATT al
- 2020 – Andrew Bushell, Nkasi Ogbonnah, Gary Rideout, Hannah Spear
- 2021 – Connor Low
- 2022 – Andy Assaf, Andy Hull, David McIntosh, Jillian Welsh
- 2023 – Coko Galore, Devon Henderson, Liz Johnston, Matt Keevins, Shane O'Regan, Ron Pedersen
- 2024 — Conor Bradbury, Christian Smith, Tiyawnda, Scott Yamamura
- 2025 — Elise Wattman

=== Chicago ETC (1983-present) ===
- 1983 – Bill Applebaum, Rob Bronstein, Don DePollo, Jim Fay, Susan Gauthier, Carey Goldenberg, Jeff Michalski, Jane Morris, Bernard Sahlins, Joyce Sloane, Ruby Streak
- 1984 – Steve Assad, Dan Castellaneta, Isabella Hofmann, Maureen Kelly, Harry Murphy
- 1985 – Andrew Alexander, Len Stuart
- 1986 – Mark Belden, Mindy Bell, Kevin Crowley, Kevin Doyle, Joe Keefe, Barbara Wallace
- 1987 – Chris Barnes, Madeleine Belden, Joe Liss, Ron West
- 1988 – Laura Hall, Judith Scott, Jill Talley, Holly Wortell
- 1989 – Mark Beltzman, Dan Gillogly, Nate Herman, Michael McCarthy, Ruth Rudnick
- 1990 – Fran Adams, Steve Carell, Tom Gianas, John Rubano
- 1991 – Rose Abdoo, Megan Moore Burns, Peter Burns, Ken Hudson Campbell, David Razowsky
- 1992 – Scott Allman, Stephen Colbert, Ian Gomez, Jackie Hoffman, Jenna Jolovitz, Kelly Leonard
- 1993 – Scott Adsit, Michael Broh, Jimmy Doyle, Norm Holly, Nia Vardalos
- 1994 – John Hildreth
- 1995 – Adam McKay, Jeff Richmond, Aaron Rhodes, Dee Ryan, Brian Stack, Miriam Tolan, Jim Zulevic
- 1996 – Neil Flynn, Laura Krafft, Jerry C. Minor, Horatio Sanz, Peter Zahradnick
- 1997 – Aaron Carney, Matt Dwyer, Rachel Hamilton, Mick Napier, Rebecca Sohn, Rich Talarico
- 1998 – Craig Cackowski, Kristin Ford, Noah Gregoropoulos, Tami Sagher
- 1999 – Ali Farahnakian, Martin Garcia, Sue Gillan, Beth Kligerman, Jack McBrayer, David Pompeii, Lyn Pusztai, Klaus Peter Schuller, Angela V. Shelton, Trey Stone, Michael Thomas
- 2000 – Rob Bogart, Dexter Bullard, Andy Cobb, Debra Downing, Abby Sher
- 2001 – Sam Albert, Joshua Funk, T. J. Jagodowski, Keegan-Michael Key
- 2002 – Peter Grosz, Nyima Funk, Jean Villepique
- 2003 – Jeremy Wilcox
- 2004 – Lee Brackett, Jen Bills, Rebecca Drysdale, Ithamar Enriquez, Robin Hammond, Frank Caeti, Matt Craig, Alison Riley
- 2005 – Rebecca Sage Allen, Jim Carlson, Alex Fendrich, Robert Janas, Chad Krueger, Niki Lindgren, Nicky Margolis
- 2006 – Amanda Blake Davis, Kirk Hanley, Andy St. Clair
- 2007 – W. Shane Oman, Marc Warzecha
- 2008 – Christina Anthony, Mike Descoteaux, Tom Flanigan, Megan Grano, Laura Grey, Matt Hovde, Timothy Edward Mason, Bruce Pirrie, Joseph Ruffner
- 2009 – Beth Melewski
- 2010 – Tim Baltz, Billy Bungeroth, Jesse Case, Brendan Jennings, Mary Sohn, Monica Wilson
- 2011 – Kyle Anderson, Aidy Bryant, Jessica Joy, Michael Lehrer, Jeremy Smith
- 2012 – Ryan Bernier, Mike Kosinski, Tawny Newsome, Andĕl Sudik, Chris Witaske
- 2013 – Carisa Barreca, Brooke Breit, Alex Kliner, Punam Patel
- 2014 – Jen Ellison, Eddie Mujica, Asher Perlman, Chris Redd, Tim Ryder
- 2015 – Lisa Beasley, Anthony LeBlanc, Scott Morehead, Rashawn Nadine Scott
- 2016 – Aasia Lashay Bullock, Laura Hum, Peter Kim, Katie Klein, Julie Marchiano
- 2017 – Sayjal Joshi, Andrew Knox, Alan Linic, Jasbir Singh, Jacob Shuda, Lesley Stone, Tien Tran
- 2018 – E.R. Fightmaster, Jen Hoyt, Katie Kershaw, Anneliese Toft
- 2019 – Atra Asdou, E.J. Cameron, Mark Campbell, Laurel Krabacher, Chuck Norment
- 2020 – Terrence Carey, Dawn Kusinski, Elise Wattman
- 2021 – Abby Beggs, Alex Bellisle, Jon Carr, Cat McDonnell, Tilliski Ramey
- 2022 – Claudia Martinez, Jordan Savusa
- 2023 — Meghan Babbe, Leila Gorstein, Jeff Griggs, John Love, Tim Metzler, Brittani Yawn
- 2024 — Janelle Cheyne, Javid Iqbal
- 2025 — Spencer Hodges, Max Thomas

== Alumni of Past Resident & Satellite Companies ==
=== Edmonton, Alberta (1979-1982) ===
Andrew Alexander, Bob Bainborough, Sandra Balcovske, Lorraine Behnan, Gabe Cohen, Bob Derkach, Ron Dickinson, Robin Duke, Michael J. Gellman, Christine Henderson, Sparky Johnston, Jerrold Karch, Gail Kerbel, Keith Knight, Don Lamont, David Mann, Kat Mullaly, Jeanette Nelson, Jan Randall, Mert Rich, Carol Sinclair, Kevin Smith, Veena Sood, Doug Stratton, Len Stuart, Adrian Truss

=== London, Ontario (1983-1992) ===
Donald Adams, Andrew Alexander, Dana Andersen, Elizabeth Baird, Sandra Balcovske, Jack Banks, John Bynum, Luc Casimiri, Alan Catlin, John Costello, Catherine Creary, Kimm Culkin, Martin de Maat, Patrick Dubois, Kevin Frank, Michael J. Gellman, Mike Goran, Kathryn Greenwood, Allan Guttman, David Healey, Karen Hines, Shari Hollett, Wendy Hopkins, Bruce Hunter, Todd Jeffrey-Ellis, Linda Kash, Madelyn Keane, Joe Keefe, Peter Keleghan, Deborah Kimmett, Elvira Kurt, Lindsay Leese, Frank McAnulty, Patrick McKenna, Steve Morel, Sue Morrison, Barbara Muller, Lori Nasso, Lyn Okkerse, Jenny Parsons, Bruce Pirrie, Karen Poce, Ed Sahely, John Erskine-Kellie, Jerry Schaefer, Jane Schoettle, Devin Scott, Paul Scott, Blaine Selkirk, Tim Sims, Brian Smith, Marilyn Smith, Rob Smith, Len Stuart, David Talbot, Deborah Theaker, Adrian Truss, Nia Vardalos, Audrey Webb, Jonathan Wilson, Mark Wilson

=== Northwest (Rolling Meadows, IL) (1988–1995) ===
- 1988 – Fran Adams, Andrew Alexander, Jon Anderson, Mark Beltzman, Bill Cusack, Fred Kaz, Tim O'Malley, David Pasquesi, Ruth Rudnick, Cheryl Sloane, Joyce Sloane, Len Stuart
- 1989 – Steve Carell, Christina Dunne, Jim Jatho, Sean Masterson, John Michalski, David Razowsky, John Rubano, Claudia Smith-Special, Faith Soloway
- 1990 – Ken Campbell, Kevin Crowley, Amy Sedaris
- 1991 – Scott Allman, Stephen Colbert, Paul Dinello, Ian Gomez, Jackie Hoffman, John Holtson, Megan Moore-Burns, Mick Napier, Charlie Silliman, Nia Vardalos
- 1992 – Scott Adsit, Tom Gianas, John Hildreth, Norm Holly, Mark Levenson, Aliza Murrieta, Aaron Rhodes, Mitch Rouse, Jim Zulevic
- 1993 – Peter Burns, Deborah Goldberg, Karol Kent, Kelly Leonard, John Thies, Tracy Thorpe
- 1994 – Renee Albert, Pat Andrews, Bernadette Birkett, Martin Brady, Matt Dwyer, Jennifer Estlin, Pat Finn, Michael J. Gellman, David Koechner, Ron West
- 1995 – Michael Bloom, Anne Libera, Theresa Mulligan, Todd Stashwick, Nancy Walls

=== Santa Monica, CA (1989) ===
- 1989 – Dana Andersen, Chris Barnes, Christopher Best, Mark DeCarlo, Andy Dick, Robin Duke, Teresa Ganzel, Michael Hagerty, John Hemphill, Bonnie Hunt, Fred Kaz, Richard Kind, Don Lake, Jeff Michalski, Jane Morris, Joseph Plewa, Jan Randall, Ryan Stiles, Linda White

=== Detroit (1993–2007) ===
- 1993 – Andrew Alexander, Robin Bucci, Colin Ferguson, John Holston, Mark Levenson, Jerry C. Minor, Suzy Nakamura, Andrew Newberg, Lyn Okkerse, Tim Pryor, Jackie Purtan, Angela Shelton, Len Stuart
- 1994 – Tom Gianas, Nancy Hayden, Todd Stashwick
- 1995 – Peter Burns, John Farley, Joshua Funk, Dionna Griffin-Irons, Grant Krause, Emily Rose Merrell, Edd Smarron, Chris Smith, Rico Bruce Wade
- 1996 – Larry Campbell, Kim Greene, John Hildreth, Chad Krueger, Anne Libera, Trey Stone
- 1997 – Eric Black, Margaret Exner, Andrew Graham, Brandon Johnson, Keegan-Michael Key, Joe Latessa, Catherine Worth
- 1998 – Joshua Funk, Michael J. Gellman, Elaine Hendricks, Marc Evan Jackson, Mary Jane Pories, Ron West, Nyima Woods
- 1999 – John Edwartowski, Shatha Faraj, Joe Janes, Antoine McKay, Maribeth Monroe, Mary Vinette, Marc Warzecha
- 2000 – Dexter Bullard, Jeff Fritz, Kirk Hanley, David Razowsky, Cheri Lynne VandenHeuvel
- 2001 – Rob Chambers, Kiff VandenHeuvel
- 2002 – Scott Allman, Suzan Gouine, Lisa Maxine Melinn, Topher Owen
- 2003 – Jelly, PJ Jacokes, Shawn Handlon
- 2005 – Ken Faulk, Jenny Hagel, Quintin Hicks, Matt Hovde, Tiffany Jones, Caroline Syran Rauch
- 2006 – Jim Carlson, Amy Duffy, Nate DuFort, Brett Guennel, Shari Hollett, Tara Nida, Tim Robinson, Megan Hovde
- 2007 – Jaime Moyer

=== Las Vegas, NV (2001–2008) ===
- 2001 – Dan Bakkedahl, Frank Caeti, Kay Cannon, Joshua Diamond, Matt Dwyer, Jennifer Estlin, Mary Pat Farrell, Sarah Gee, Karen Graci, Kelly Haran, Fred Hemmiger, Joe Janes, Robin Johnson, Mike Lukas, Seamus McCarthy, Mick Napier, Phil Randall, Jason Sudeikis, Jean Villepique, Marc Warzecha, Mike Watkins
- 2002 – Scott Allman, Ed Goodman, Brooke Schoening, Holly Walker
- 2003 – Joe Kelly, Amy Rowell, Brian Shortall
- 2004 – Ithamar Enriquez, Martin Garcia, Lauren Dowden, Shatha Hicks, Bridget Kloss
- 2005 – Amanda Blake Davis, Paul Mattingly, David Novich, Craig Uhlir
- 2006 – Ryan Archibald, Jim Carlson, Shelly Gossman, Katie Neff, David Novich, Andy St. Clair
- 2007 – Rob Belushi, Michael Lehrer, Robin Lynn Norris, Bruce Pirrie, Anne Marie Saviano

=== Cleveland, OH (2002–2004) ===
- 2002 – Andrew Alexander, George Pete Caleodis, Maria Corell, Cody Dove, Colleen Doyle, Joshua Funk, Jack Hourigan, Kelly Leonard, Tommy LeRoy, Quinn Patterson, Dana Quercioli, David Schmoll, Ron West
- 2003 – Dave Buckman, Katie Caussin, Nate Cockerill, Lauren Dowden, Randall Harr, Chad Krueger, Joseph Ruffner, Kiff VandenHeuvel

=== Denver, CO (2006) ===
- 2006 – Dave Colan, Brendan Dowling, Jenny Hagel, Matt Hovde, Timothy Edward Mason, Beth Melewski, Amber Ruffin

=== New York (2024 – 2025) ===
- 2024 — Jeff Bouthiette, Jen Ellison, Kayla Freeman, Ashley Leisten, Ben Rameaka, Yazmin Ramos, Drew Reilly, Jordan Savusa, Jacklyn Uweh

== Notable Alumni of Touring and Theatrical ensembles ==
- 1980 – Julia Louis-Dreyfus
- 1989 – Jane Lynch
- 1995 – Ian Roberts, Matt Walsh
- 1996 – Amy Poehler
- 1997 – Peter Gwinn
- 2001 – John Lutz
- 2005 – Jordan Klepper, T.J. Miller
- 2007 – Abby McEnany
- 2008 – Steven Yeun
- 2009 – Vanessa Bayer, Thomas Middleditch, Amber Nash
- 2011 – Cecily Strong
- 2012 – Tara Ochs
- 2013 – Ashley Nicole Black
- 2015 – Ali Barthwell
- 2016 – Felonious Munk
