= Bucket of Blood (musical) =

- Poster by Scott Williams
- Music: Chuck Malone
- Basis: "A Bucket of Blood" by Roger Corman
- Premiere: 26 September 2009: Annoyance Theater

Bucket of Blood is a musical based on the film of similar name from legendary low budget director Roger Corman. Produced by Chicago's Annoyance Theater, the show opened September 26, 2009 and closed October 31, 2009 and was directed by Ray Mees, with music written by Chuck Malone.

== Plot ==
The plot of the show mirrors that of the film, with only a few minor adjustments. Still set in the late 1950s, with the theater set up to be a part of the "Yellow Door Cafe" with much of the action taking place at tables set in the middle of the audience.

=== Act 1 ===
The show opens with the latest poem of Maxwell H. Brock, after which the cast arrives on stage inviting the "squares" into this world, and introducing many of the lead players ("The Bucket of Blood"). After hearing the poem and taking abuse from the regulars and his boss Leonard ("Walter, You're a Busboy"), socially awkward busboy Walter Paisley returns home to attempt to create a sculpture of the face of the hostess Carla, whom he has a crush on ("I Know That I'm An Artist"). Despite his best efforts, his sculpture fails. He stops when he hears the meowing of Frankie, the cat owned by his inquisitive landlady Mrs. Surchart, who has somehow gotten himself stuck in Walter's wall. Walter attempts to get Frankie out using a knife, but accidentally kills the cat when he sticks the knife into his wall. Disgusted with himself, Walter cries himself to sleep and has a maniacal dream sequence in which he remembers the torments of the day and ends with the poetry of Brock pour through his tormented mind, giving him a radical inspiration. Instead of giving Frankie a proper burial, Walter covers the cat in clay, leaving the knife stuck in it. ("Busboy Reprise")

Next morning, Walter shows the cat to Carla and Leonard. Leonard dismisses the oddly morbid piece but Carla enthuses about the work, which is then displayed in the café. Walter gets newfound respect from the beatniks and poets who hang out in the café ("Dead Cat Rag"). An adoring fan, Naolia, gives him a vial of heroin to remember her by ("Naolia's Song"). Naively ignorant of its function, he takes it home while Lou Raby, an undercover cop, follows him. Meanwhile, Leonard discovers the secret behind Walter's "Dead Cat" piece. He decides to keep the secret when an art collector approaches him and offers $500 for "Dead Cat." Back at Walter's Apartment, Lou attempts to take Walter into custody for narcotics possession. In a blind panic, Walter smashes his frying pan into Lou's head, killing him. The fracas alerts his landlady, and Walter fast talks her out of the apartment as he tries to hide the body ("Walter, Repetition is Death").

=== Act 2 ===
Act 2 opens with the ensemble number "Walter Save Me" Next morning, both Leonard and Carla come with Walter as he unveils his latest work and are simultaneously amazed and appalled. Carla critiques it as "hideous and eloquent" and deserving of a public exhibition. Leonard, aghast at the idea, and downing a glass of scotch, realizes the potential for wealth if he plays this right. He and Carla quarrel over giving Walter a show, a prospect that delights the simpleton, especially as Leonard gives him a paltry cash advance to keep quiet.

The next night, Walter is treated like a king by pretty much everyone, except for Alice, who has been out of town. Despite being pinup gorgeous, she is obnoxious and disliked. As Brock explains that a great artist is in their midst, Alice mocks Walter until he leaves in a huff. ("And Nobody Would Care if You Died") Walter later follows her home; she slams the door in his face. Despite his anger, he persists, explaining that he wants her model and is willing to pay her price. At Walter's apartment, Alice strips nude off camera, and poses in a chair. Walter suggests she put back on her scarf and, in a pretense of adjusting it to look right, uses it to strangle her. The latest work is brought to Brock's house, where the gang is gathered for a sumptuous organic breakfast ("Beatnik Breakfast Party"). Once unveiled, the statue of Alice renders them awestruck and Carla is so pleased that she kisses Walter.Brock is so impressed, he throws a party at the Yellow Door in Walter's honor. Costumed as a carnival fool, Walter is wined and dined to excess. Leonard keeps an eye on him, worried that he will make some mistake that will blow this deal. Brock composes a poem especially for Walter that provides him more twisted inspiration. ("What Am I Gonna Do Next?")

Walter later stumbles back home, realizing he has to make good on his promise to make more work. Still drunk and with his rage unleashed, he murders an Ice Cream man by freezing his head with his own ice cream cart to create a bust. ("Ice Cream Waltz") When he shows it to Leonard, with the word of a horrible decapitation in the neighborhood fresh off the press, his boss realizes he has to stop Walter's murderous rampage. He promises Walter his show to offload these "statues," at an exhibit of Walter's works. ("Leonard's Tango"). Before the show, Walter proposes to Carla, who rejects him.("Never Knew That You Loved Me") Walter is distraught and now offers to sculpt her, and she happily agrees to after the reception. Back at the exhibit, however, she finds part of the clay on one figure has worn away, revealing a human finger. When she tells Walter that there's a body in one of the sculptures, he tells her that he "made them immortal," and that he can make her immortal too. She flees the exhibit, and he chases after her. Meanwhile, the others at the exhibit learn Walter's secret as well, and chase after them. Walter and Carla wind up at a lumber yard where Walter, haunted by the statues and voices of Lou, Alice, and the nameless ice cream man, stops chasing after Carla, and runs home. With discovery and retribution closing in on him, Walter then vows to 'hide where they'll never find me.' The art critics, Carla, Leonard and Maxwell break down Walter's apartment door only to find that Walter has hanged himself. Looking askance at the hanging corpse, Maxwell proclaims that this could be 'his greatest work'! ("Bucket of Blood Reprise")

The character of Alice appears much earlier in the story to explain her later appearance and death. Instead of sawing the head off of a wood worker, Walter now freezes the head of an ice cream man. Leonard is never without a scotch, drinking it to excess when Walter's murders begin adding to his stress.

== Cast ==
The cast consisted of several Annoyance Theater regulars, as well as a few newcomers to the Annoyance Stage. Due to the small cast, several cast members doubled on smaller roles.

James Stanton... Walter Paisley

Sam Locke... Leonard

Peter Robards... Maxwell

Jen Spyra... Carla

Colleen Breen... Naolia/Ms. Swickert/Art Dealer

Maari Suorsa... Alice

Tyler Patocka... William/Art Dealer

Peter Kremidas... Lee/Ice Cream Man

== Reception ==
The show was well received by Chicago critics, including the Chicago Reader and the Loyola Phoenix. The Annoyance billed the show as part of a Halloween double feature with the theater's classic, long running blood show Splatter Theatre.
