= Mishu Hilmy =

American comedian, writer, actor, impressionist and playwright

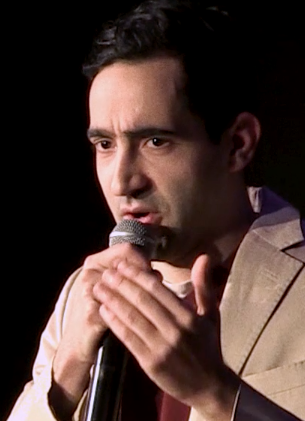

Comedy career
- Medium: Comedy
- Genres: Impressionist, sketch comedy, observational comedy, satire, pop-culture
- Subjects: American culture, everyday life, human behavior, pop culture, American politics
- Website: www.mishuhilmy.com

Mishu Hilmy is an American comedian, writer, actor, impressionist, and playwright. He most recently wrote, performed, and executive produced the Netflix-parody comedy special Trapped in the Netflix. He has contributed to and appeared on The Daily Show with Jon Stewart. In 2014, alongside Eric Simon, he co-wrote the Annoyance Theatre play Good Morning Gitmo.

The Chicago Reader has described Hilmy's humor as "something I happily cannot unsee." The Chicago theater and entertainment industry publication, Performink, stated: "Hilmy’s skill with impressions and interweaving of social commentary form a strong core to this solo sketch show with a definitive voice." His comedy-special included over 30 characters and impressions.

He was part of the Chicago ensemble based comedy theater Under the Gun. While there he performed in a sketch revue alongside Empire's Antoine McKay. Hilmy has also performed at the Upright Citizens Brigade Theater, iO Theater, Annoyance Theater and The Second City. In 2016, Hilmy founded The Comedy Fellowship.

Some of his impressions have included Jon Hamm, Martin Scorsese, Adam Driver, and Malcolm Gladwell.
