= Day-O (film) =

1992 television film directed by Michael Schultz

- Genre: Comedy; Family; Fantasy
- Written by: Bruce Franklin Singer
- Directed by: Michael Schultz
- Starring: Delta Burke; Elijah Wood; Carlin Glynn; Charles Shaughnessy; David Packer; Ashley Peldon; Fred Dalton Thompson
- Music by: Lee Holdridge
- Country of origin: United States
- Original language: English

Production
- Executive producer: Steve White
- Producers: Barbara Bernardi; Ira Shuman
- Production locations: Wilmington, North Carolina; Carolina Beach, North Carolina; Wrightsville Beach, North Carolina
- Cinematography: Isidore Mankofsky
- Editor: Christopher Holmes
- Running time: 120 minutes
- Production companies: Walt Disney Television; Steve White Productions

Original release
- Network: NBC
- Release: May 3, 1992

Day-O is a 1992 American made-for-television fantasy-comedy film about an imaginary childhood friend, "Dayo", played by Elijah Wood, of a woman played by Delta Burke. The film aired on NBC as a presentation of Disney Night at the Movies on May 3, 1992.

== Plot ==
The return of an imaginary childhood friend, Dayo, helps a woman named Grace Connors through various crises, Grace struggles against her timidity to save her grandfather's restaurant. The arrival of her imaginary childhood friend spurs her on to success.

== Cast ==
- Delta Burke as Grace Connors
  - Ashley Peldon as Grace (age 4)
- Elijah Wood as Dayo
- Carlin Glynn as Margaret DeGeorgio
- Charles Shaughnessy as Ben Connors
- David Packer as Tony DeGeorgio
- Fred Dalton Thompson as Frank DeGeorgio
- Caroline Dollar as Cory Connors
- Bekka Eaton as Judith
- Richard K. Olsen as Papa Louie
- Michael Hunter as Man at the Park

== Reception ==
Carole Kucharewicz of Variety magazine wrote: "A charming, well-done telepic revolving around a frazzled Delta Burke, "Dayo" is full of Disney "magic" and above-average performances. Telefilm is enjoyable for adults who want some escape from "60 Minutes," but it's doubtful if children will glean much from the well-written script."
