= Splatter Theatre =

Splatter Theatre was the first show for The Annoyance Theatre. The show was first performed at the Cabaret Metro, on October 31, 1987 and directed by Mick Napier. Performers involved in the original production included Joe Bill, Marguerite Hammersley, Doug Hartzell, Kim Howard Johnson, Kaluah, Richard Laible, Geoffrey Lantz, David MacNerland, Jill Meyerhoff, Brett Paisel, David Pasquesi, Lyn Pusztai, David Razowsky, Al Rose, Barry Saltzman, Tim Slagle, Faith Soloway, Ellen Stoneking, Elizabeth Trask, Eric Waddel, and Harlan Wallach.

== Plot ==
A spoof of gory slasher films, along the lines of Friday the 13th or Halloween, Splatter Theatre features thirteen characters, all clichéd horror movie characters—the high school jock, the virgin, the class jerk, the bimbo, the nerd—killed in various creatively disgusting ways.

The stage itself is freshly painted white, and the actors wear white costumes, allowing the red blood to stand out for the audience.

== Remounts ==
With the reopening of the Annoyance Theatre, the company has begun producing Splatter as a Halloween Tradition.

Mick Napier directed the remount of the show in 2006, with an entirely new cast, adding effects to the show to change some of the deaths.

In 2007, Andrew Hobgood directed a remount of the show, with several members of the 2006 cast returning. On October 31, 2007, the 20th anniversary of the Annoyance Theater, Splatter was given a special performance, which included several of the original cast members from the 1987 production. The returning cast members were Eric Waddel, Joe Bill, Ellen Stoneking, Lynn Pusztai and Margueritte Hammersley.

In 2008 and 2009, Sam Locke directed the show, with a mostly new cast each year. Ray Mees directed in 2010. Charley Carroll directed the next three productions, including the 2014 remount at the theater's newest location at 851 W. Belmont in Chicago IL. Sam Locke returned as bloodmaster.

The 2015 remount is being directed by Jo Scott.

Jonald Jude Reyes directed the 2016 and 2017 editions of Splatter, which included the 30th anniversary of the show.

In 2018 Splatter was directed by Joe McDaniel.

In 2019 Charley Carroll returned as director with Sam Locke on blood.

In 2020, during the global Covid pandemic, with theaters around the world closed, the Annoyance created a virtual splatter experience. The virtual edition was directed by Joe McDaniel

In 2021 Sam Locke directed the first live stage Splatter Theatre since 2019.

During the 2024 performance, Andy Rowell ate raw chicken and raw beef onstage while performing as the character Meat Puppets. He threw up after the performance.
