= Del Close =

American actor, writer, and teacher (1934–1999)

- Born: March 9, 1934; Manhattan, Kansas, U.S.
- Died: March 4, 1999 (aged 64); Chicago, Illinois, U.S.
- Resting place: iO Theater, Chicago, Illinois, U.S.
- Occupations: Actor, writer, teacher
- Years active: 1960–1999
- Notable work: The Delmonic Interviews iO; The Del Close Theater; Truth in Comedy: The Manual of Improvisation

Del Close (March 9, 1934 – March 4, 1999) was an American actor, writer, and teacher who coached many of the best-known comedians and comic actors of the late twentieth century. In addition to an acting career in television and film, he was one of the influences on modern improvisational theater. Close was co-founder of the ImprovOlympic (iO).

== Life and career ==
=== Early life ===
Close was born on March 9, 1934, in Manhattan, Kansas. He ran away from home at the age of 17 to work in a traveling side show, but returned to attend Kansas State University. At age 19 he performed in summer stock with the Belfry Players at Lake Geneva, Wisconsin. At age 23 he became a member of the Compass Players in St. Louis. When most of the cast—including Mike Nichols and Elaine May—moved to New York City, Close followed.

He developed a stand-up comedy act, starred as the Yogi in the Broadway musical revue The Nervous Set, and performed briefly with an improv company in Greenwich Village with fellow Compass alumni Mark and Barbara Gordon. Close also worked with John Brent to record the classic Beatnik satire album How to Speak Hip, a parody of language-learning tools that purported to teach listeners the secret language of the "hipster".

=== Chicago years ===
In 1960 Close moved to Chicago, his home base for much of the rest of his life, to perform and direct at Second City, but was fired due to substance abuse. He spent the latter half of the 1960s in San Francisco where he was the house director of improv ensemble The Committee, featuring performers such as Gary Goodrow, Carl Gottlieb, Peter Bonerz, Howard Hesseman and Larry Hankin. The Second City later described Close as having developed the long-form improvisation format he called the "Harold" while working with The Committee in San Francisco, before returning to Chicago in 1972. He toured with the Merry Pranksters, and he created light images for Grateful Dead shows.

In 1972, he returned to Chicago and to Second City. He also directed and performed for Second City's troupe in Toronto in 1977. Over the next decade he coached many popular comedians. In the early 1980s he served as "house metaphysician" at Saturday Night Live; for many years, a significant percentage of the show's cast were Close protégés. He spent the mid-to-late 1980s and 1990s teaching improv, collaborating with Charna Halpern at Yes And Productions and the ImprovOlympic Theater with Compass Players producer, David Shepherd.

In 1987, Close mounted his first scripted show, Honor Finnegan vs. the Brain of the Galaxy, created by members of Close and Halpern's Improv Olympics from a scenario by Close, at CrossCurrents in Chicago. Running concurrently at the same theater was The TV Dinner Hour, written by Richard O'Donnell of New Age Vaudeville, featuring Close's running routine as The Rev. Thing of the First Generic Church of What's-his-name.

During this period, Close also appeared in several movies; he portrayed corrupt alderman John O'Shay in The Untouchables and an English teacher in Ferris Bueller's Day Off. He co-authored the graphic horror anthology Wasteland for DC Comics with John Ostrander, and co-wrote several installments of the "Munden's Bar" backup feature for Ostrander's Grimjack. His later stage credits included Steve Martin's Picasso at the Lapin Agile at Briar Street Theatre.

=== Personal life ===
An obituary published in the Manhattan Mercury said that Close's father died in Manhattan, Kansas, on December 16, 1954, after being found unconscious in his jewelry store and that the cause of death was "self-inflicted." Close would have been 20 years old and, according to Kim "Howard" Johnson, a biographer in the documentary For Madmen Only: The Stories of Del Close, Close was in New York at the time, over a thousand miles away from where his father died.

Close had told many varied and dramatic accounts of his father's suicide, with the general story being that his father did it right in front of him when he was a child (accounts vary in age between 6–17 years old) by drinking a caustic liquid (various accounts on which type of caustic liquid).

Regardless of when or how the suicide of Close's father occurred, many of his friends believed it had a profound effect on him. Close would frequently bring it up in conversation with friends and even on stage. In the 2020 documentary For Madmen Only: The Stories of Del Close, he is filmed on stage saying to the improv actors and audience, "My father was a spectacular suicide. He drank a quart of sulphuric acid, slashed his wrists. And they kept him alive for two days longer than Jesus hung on the cross, and I used to use that death to get sympathy and to get laid with."

Then Close wanted to do an improv scene where he would play himself and another actor, Dave Thomas, would play the doctor who would tell Close that his father had just died from the suicide that Close had described. Thomas refused, saying in the documentary that he didn't think it would be a good joke and that there was an obligation to the audience to create laughs—not just to make them gasp. Close replied, "Now perhaps you're not used to this particular kind of horrifying honesty, but I expect the same thing from you and nothing less."

Close was addicted to heroin and cocaine but decided to change his lifestyle when his student John Belushi died of a drug overdose in 1982, although he continued to smoke marijuana. Close had recently read the book A Witch's Guide to Psychic Healing by Yvonne Frost, which argues that the modern Pagan religion Wicca can provide spiritual healing. He joined a Wiccan coven in Toronto and fought his drug habit together with Wiccan priests who performed a banishing ritual. He stopped using drugs and remained an active Pagan.

=== Death and legacy ===
Close died of emphysema on March 4, 1999, at the Illinois Masonic Hospital (now the Advocate Illinois Masonic Medical Center) in Chicago, aged 64. He bequeathed his skull to Chicago's Goodman Theatre to be used in its productions of Hamlet, and specified that he be duly credited in the program as portraying Yorick. Charna Halpern, Close's long-time professional partner and the executor of his will, conveyed a skull that she claimed was his in a high-profile televised ceremony on July 1, 1999. A front-page article in the Chicago Tribune in July 2006 questioned the authenticity of the skull, however, citing the presence of teeth (Close was edentulous — toothless — at the time of his death) as well as showing the presence of autopsy marks (Close was never autopsied) among other problems. The Goodman's artistic director, Robert Falls, who had directed Del Close as Polonius, held out the skull in his right hand and spoke: "Alas, poor Del! I knew him, Horatio: A fellow of infinite jest . . ." Halpern stood by her story at the time but admitted three months later, in a The New Yorker interview, that she had purchased the skull from a local medical supply company.

Bill Murray organized an early 65th birthday party and wake, shortly before Close's anticipated death as he lay on his deathbed in a Chicago hospital, memorialized in a two-part video.

Following Close's death, his former students in the Upright Citizens Brigade founded the annual Del Close Marathon, three days of continuous improvisation by hundreds of performers at various venues in New York City.

== Notable students ==
- Dan Aykroyd
- Ike Barinholtz
- Jim Belushi
- John Belushi
- Matt Besser
- Stephen Burrows
- Heather Anne Campbell
- John Candy
- Jay Chandrasekhar
- Stephen Colbert
- Andy Dick
- Brian Doyle-Murray
- Rachel Dratch
- Ali Farahnakian
- Chris Farley
- Jon Favreau
- Tina Fey
- Neil Flynn
- Aaron Freeman
- Pete Gardner
- Jon Glaser
- T. J. Jagodowski
- Tim Kazurinsky
- David Koechner
- Eugene Levy
- Shelley Long
- Adam McKay
- Tim Meadows
- Susan Messing
- Jerry Minor
- Bill Murray
- Joel Murray
- Mike Myers
- Bob Odenkirk
- Catherine O'Hara
- Tim O'Malley (actor)
- David Pasquesi
- Amy Poehler
- Gilda Radner
- Harold Ramis
- Andy Richter
- Ian Roberts
- Hugh Romney (Wavy Gravy)
- Mitch Rouse
- Horatio Sanz
- Amy Sedaris
- Jason Sudeikis
- Brian Stack
- Eric Stonestreet
- Dave Thomas
- Vince Vaughn
- Matt Walsh
- Stephnie Weir
- George Wendt

== The Delmonic Interviews ==
In 2002, Cesar Jaime and Jeff Pacocha produced and directed The Delmonic Interviews, a documentary film built from interviews with former students, friends, and collaborators of Del Close as a tribute to his influence on modern improvisation. In a 2012 article for Vulture, Elise Czajkowski described the film as a tribute to Close and wrote that it was shown occasionally at Chicago's iO Theater and screened at festivals and theaters a few times each year.

The Delmonic Interviews includes interviews with: Charna Halpern (co-founder of Chicago's iO Theater), Matt Besser (iO's The Family; Upright Citizens Brigade), Rachel Dratch (iO; Second City; Saturday Night Live), Neil Flynn (iO's The Family; NBC's Scrubs), Susan Messing (iO; Second City; Annoyance Productions), Amy Poehler (Upright Citizens Brigade, Saturday Night Live), and Miles Stroth (iO's The Family; Del's "Warchief"). The film was shown at several national improv festivals, including the 2004 Chicago Improv Festival, the 2004 Phoenix Improv Festival, the 2002 Del Close Marathon in New York City, and the 2006 LA Improv Festival.

== In print ==
Close is featured in an extensive interview in Something Wonderful Right Away, a book about the members of the Compass Players and Second City written by Jeffrey Sweet. Originally published in 1978 by Avon, it is currently available from Limelight Editions.

From 1984 to 1988, Del Close wrote comic book stories in First Comics' Grimjack. With regular writer John Ostrander, Close co-wrote Munden's Bar stories in Grimjack issues #3, 4, 8, 10, 17, 22, 25, 28, 35, and 42. (Close knew Ostrander from the Chicago theater scene.) From 1987 to 1989, also with Ostrander, Close wrote anthology-style horror stories in the DC Comics title Wasteland. Several of the stories are allegedly autobiographical; one recounts Close's experiences while filming Beware! The Blob (1972), and another recalls an encounter with writer L. Ron Hubbard, author of horror and science fiction, and founder of Scientology. Eric Spitznagel wrote about when he heard Close recount his alleged meeting with L.Ron Hubbard, in which Close claimed to have suggested to Hubbard, "Well, if you're worried about taxes, you should just turn Scientology into a religion" (an anecdote that Spitznagel claimed many others have heard Close recount also). In the 2020 documentary, For Madmen Only: The Stories of Del Close, one of the interviewees, Charna Halpern, recounts that she had heard Close say the same anecdote about himself and Hubbard. There have been a number of different individuals that have claimed for themselves, or been attributed with, giving Hubbard the suggestion of turning Scientology into a religion in order to make a lot of money.

In 2004, writer/comedian R. O'Donnell wrote "My Summer With Del" for Stop Smiling magazine #17 Comedian Issue. The feature was an account of O'Donnell's visits at Del's Chicago apartment as well as recounting highlights of their time spent at CrossCurrents, the theater that housed both their comedy groups.

In 2005, Jeff Griggs published Guru: My Days with Del Close, detailing their friendship during the last two years of Close's life. Due to Close's poor health (in part caused by long-term alcohol and drug use), Halpern suggested that Griggs run errands with Close. Guru gives a particularly detailed and complete picture of Close based on those shared hours. At the beginning of their relationship, Griggs was a student of Del's, and the book includes several chapters in which Griggs depicts Close as a teacher. Griggs also wrote that as Close's reputation grew, improv clubs around the country invited him to teach, and that some of those visits developed into weeklong festivals, including Austin's Big Stinkin' Improv Festival, which Griggs described as "the biggest of the bunch". The book has been adapted into a screenplay, and as of 2006 Harold Ramis was attached to direct the script. Ramis (who died in 2014) wanted Bill Murray to play Close.

Close co-authored the 1994 book Truth in Comedy: The Manual of Improvisation with Charna Halpern and Kim "Howard" Johnson; the book outlines techniques now common in longform improvisation and describes the overall structure of "Harold", which remains a common frame for longer improvisational scenes.

In 2007, Eric Spitznagel wrote an article in the September issue of The Believer magazine reflecting on Close's life and his propensity for storytelling.

In 2008, Kim "Howard" Johnson published The Funniest One in the Room: The Lives and Legends of Del Close, a full-length biography. Johnson himself was a student of Close; the two remained friends until Close's death.

In 2022, Bob Odenkirk wrote a memoir Comedy, Comedy, Comedy, Drama, which includes excerpts of an interview with Del Close who was influential in the startup of his career.

== Filmography ==
- Goldstein (1964)
- Beware! The Blob (1972) as Hobo Wearing Eyepatch
- Gold (1972) as Hawk
- American Graffiti (1973) as Man at Bar (Guy)
- The Last Affair (1976)
- Thief (1981) as Mechanic #1
- Ferris Bueller's Day Off (1986) as English Teacher
- One More Saturday Night (1986) as Mr. Schneider / Large Tattooed Man
- Light of Day (1987) as Dr. Natterson
- The Untouchables (1987) as Alderman
- The Big Town (1987) as Deacon Daniels
- The Blob (1988) as Reverend Meeker
- Fat Man and Little Boy (1989) as Dr. Kenneth Whiteside
- Next of Kin (1989) as Frank
- Opportunity Knocks (1990) as Williamson
- The Public Eye (1992) as H.R. Rineman
- Mommy 2: Mommy's Day (1997) as Warden
- Upright Citizens Brigade (1998) as opening Narrator (voice)
- For Madmen Only: The Stories of Del Close (2020) documentary footage
