= Tony Bernazard =

Puerto Rican baseball player (born 1956)

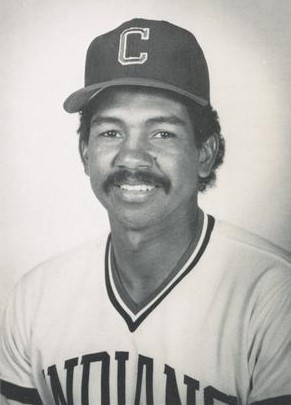
- Second baseman
- Born: August 24, 1956 (age 70); Caguas, Puerto Rico
- Batted: Switch Threw: Right

Professional debut
- MLB: July 13, 1979, for the Montreal Expos
- NPB: April 9, 1988, for the Nankai Hawks

Last appearance
- NPB: August 8, 1990, for the Fukuoka Daiei Hawks
- MLB: April 26, 1991, for the Detroit Tigers

MLB statistics
- Batting average: .262
- Home runs: 75
- Runs batted in: 391

NPB statistics
- Batting average: .289
- Home runs: 67
- Runs batted in: 193
- Stats at Baseball Reference

Teams
- Montreal Expos (1979–1980); Chicago White Sox (1981–1983); Seattle Mariners (1983); Cleveland Indians (1984–1987); Oakland Athletics (1987); Nankai / Fukuoka Daiei Hawks (1988–1990); Detroit Tigers (1991)

Antonio Bernazard Garcia (born August 24, 1956) is a Puerto Rican former Major League Baseball player and former executive in the New York Mets organization. Bernazard served as an assistant to Mets general manager Omar Minaya before being dismissed on July 27, 2009.

== Playing career ==
During his ten-year major league career, Bernazard played second base, shortstop, and designated hitter for the Montreal Expos, Chicago White Sox, Seattle Mariners, Cleveland Indians, Oakland Athletics, and Detroit Tigers. He hit 75 home runs in 3,700 at-bats with 523 runs, 177 doubles, 30 triples, 391 RBI, 113 stolen bases and 428 bases on balls. His career hitting line (BA/OBP/SLG) stands at .262/.339/.387.

Bernazard missed out on the Chicago White Sox divisional pennant run of 1983 when he was traded to the Mariners for second baseman Julio Cruz on June 15 of that year. The speedier Cruz helped spur the Sox to win the division by 20 games.

In 1984 with the Indians, he went through an 0-for-44 stretch at the plate, tying a major league hitless streak for non-pitchers in the last 50 years. He hit only .221 that year. He rebounded to have two productive seasons with the Indians, batting .274 in 1985 and a career-high .301 in 1986, while also hitting 17 home runs. Inexplicably, Topps pictured Bernazard as an American League All Star in its 1987 set (card number 607) though Bernazard was not named to the American League All Star Team in 1986 or any other season.

From 1988 to 1990, he played for the Nankai/Fukuoka Daiei Hawks (now the Fukuoka Softbank Hawks) in the Japanese Pacific League. After a brief major league comeback in 1991 with the Tigers, in which he went 2-for-12 in six games, his career was over.

== Front office career ==
Bernazard became the vice president of development for the New York Mets in December 2004 after serving as a special assistant to general manager Omar Minaya.

During the 2004 off-season, then-free agent first baseman Carlos Delgado was offended when Bernazard—a fellow Puerto Rican—attempted to gain an advantage in wooing Delgado to the Mets by utilizing what Delgado termed "street Spanish." Delgado was heavily critical in public of the Mets negotiating tactics. He reportedly referred to Bernazard as "the highest-paid translator on the planet" after meeting him and Minaya for a face-to-face negotiating session at baseball's Winter Meetings. Bernazard, who was known for his flamboyant antics around the Mets offices and Shea Stadium, downplayed the incident.

Bernazard came under scrutiny again during the 2008 season, when it was reported that he was allegedly the person who orchestrated the firing of then Mets manager Willie Randolph. Bernazard came under renewed scrutiny in late July during the 2009 season after removing his shirt and challenging several Binghamton Mets players to fights. The same week Bernazard had another tirade at Citi Field when a Diamondbacks scout occupied a seat that he wanted and one of his deputies suggested to him that he wait until the end of the half inning, prompting Bernazard to become angry. In addition, Bernazard had an angry confrontation with Mets closer Francisco Rodríguez on the team bus, while returning to the team's hotel after an 11–0 loss to the Atlanta Braves.

The Mets organization issued a statement by general manager Minaya saying, in part, "I spoke with Tony [Bernazard] this morning and informed him of my decision to terminate his employment with the Mets", confirming an earlier report. At the press conference announcing the firing, Minaya angrily challenged the accuracy of past news reports, claiming that New York Daily News reporter Adam Rubin, who initially broke the story about Bernazard challenging Binghamton Mets players to a fight, was angling for a position in the Mets organization, a claim Rubin denied. Omar Minaya fired Bernazard from the Mets on Monday July 27, 2009.

== Post-Mets career ==
In October 2009, Adam Rubin reported in his blog that Bernazard was close to joining the renowned sports agency Boras Corp., led by baseball super agent Scott Boras. In an April 27, 2010, Bernazard denied this in an interview with FOX Sports' Ken Rosenthal. In the interview, Bernazard claimed the media reports about his behavior were untrue. He also claimed the Mets organization did not support him because the team needed a scapegoat for the 2009 season. As far as his career was concerned, Bernazard was not employed by a baseball team at that time, despite the fact Bernazard claimed he "had some calls" from unspecified sources at the end of December 2009. He additionally claimed he "[hasn't] been looking for a job."

== See also ==
- List of Major League Baseball players from Puerto Rico
