= Andrew Alexander (producer) =

English producer (born 1944)

- Born: 24 March 1944 (age 82); London, England
- Education: Tri-State College; Ryerson Polytechnical Institute
- Occupation: Producer
- Known for: SCTV TV series, and former executive producer and CEO and Co-owner of The Second City

Andrew Alexander (born 24 March 1944) is an English theatre and television producer best known for his previous leadership and co-ownership of The Second City, and co-developing and producing the television show SCTV.

== Early life ==
Andrew Alexander was born in London, United Kingdom. His father, who worked in the aeronautics industry, moved the family to Canada in 1951. Brampton, Ontario—raised Alexander studied at Tri-State College in Indiana. Alexander studied at Ryerson Polytechnical Institute in Toronto, for a year and a half.

== Career ==
After studying business at the Ryerson Institute of Technology in Toronto, Alexander sold ads for a suburban weekly newspaper. In the early 1970s, he frequented the Toronto arts scene, working as an editor of Ski Magazine and for the ill-fated John Lennon Peace Festival. Alexander worked at the Global Village Theatre, co-producing late-night shows and producing the annual Spring Thaw revue. In 1972, he joined the Toronto Arts Foundation, where he marketed its subscription series at the St. Lawrence Centre. He was eventually hired by the Ivanhoe Theater in Chicago, where he met Bernie Sahlins, owner and co-founder of The Second City.

=== The Second City ===
In 1974, Alexander licensed the Canadian rights to The Second City. At the time, The Second City's Toronto location was failing; Alexander then offered to assume its debts in exchange for the rights to operate The Second City in Canada. Sahlins agreed, and in 1974, Alexander took control of The Second City Toronto. Alexander produced and developed live theatre revues and launched the careers of comedians Gilda Radner, John Candy, Dan Aykroyd, Andrea Martin, Catherine O'Hara, Eugene Levy, Martin Short, Dave Thomas, Joe Flaherty and others.

In 1976, Alexander started The Second City Entertainment Company, a TV and film production company. The company's first production was the television show SCTV.

In 1985, Alexander became co-owner of The Second City Chicago. He actively led The Second City in Canada and the US until 2020. In 1993, Alexander established Second City's Diversity & Inclusion Division, devoted to bringing new voices to the Second City stage. Over the next 28 years, this department, beginning with Frances Callier and then Dionna Griffin-Irons, was successful in bringing diverse voices to the Second City stages, with programs that included the Bob Curry Fellowship, NBCUniversal Second City Emerging Voices Scholarship Awards, and NBCUniversal Second City Breakout Festival and the Los Angeles Diversity in Comedy Festival.

Alexander has produced or executive-produced hundreds of Second City revues in Canada and the United States. Over the past 42 years, The Second City has operated resident theater and improv training facilities at one time or another in Toronto, Chicago, Detroit, Las Vegas, Los Angeles, Edmonton, London, Ontario, and Cleveland. Additionally, Alexander expanded The Second City's Training, Touring, and Corporate Services divisions from niche offerings to boutique business lines in their own right. In February 2016, Alexander announced the opening of The Harold Ramis Film School in Chicago, starting its first term in September 2016. In 2021, After almost a 50-year career with Second City, Alexander sold his interest to ZMC.

== TV and film career ==
During Alexander's career as a television producer, he co-developed and executive-produced over 185 half-hour shows and over 150 hours of television comedy for SCTV. Throughout its run, the series garnered an ACTRA Award, two Emmy Awards, and 13 Emmy Award nominations.

Alexander has developed television programming for ABC, CBS, NBC, Fox Television, Comedy Central, HBO, Showtime, A&E, and CBC. Alexander has had co-production deals with MGM Television, Imagine Entertainment, Disney Studios and United Artists. He has produced television shows with Ed Asner, Dan Aykroyd, James Belushi, Bill Murray, Chris Farley, Bonnie Hunt, Shelley Long, Andrea Martin, Steve Carell, John Candy, Mike Myers, Catherine O'Hara, Harold Ramis, Martin Short, and Dave Thomas.

Alexander executive-produced the Martin Scorsese-directed SCTV documentary for Netflix and for CTV, and was executive producer for The Second City Project, which was nominated for six 2016 Canadian Screen Awards. Alexander executive-produced I, Martin Short, Goes Home as well as Second City's Next Comedy Legend for CBC (2007). He executive-produced the 2004 Canadian feature film Intern Academy written and directed by Dave Thomas and featuring Aykroyd, Thomas, Dave Foley, and Maury Chaykin.

He was a founding shareholder of the Pay Television service Super Channel and served on the board of directors.

Alexander served on the Columbia College Chicago Board of Trustees. He was on the founding board of directors of Gilda's Club in Chicago and Toronto and has also served on the board of the League of Chicago Theatres and Canada's Walk of Fame. In 2008, Alexander facilitated a reunion of the SCTV cast in Toronto and launched The Second City Alumni Fund, which has since raised over $1,000,000 to assist actors and support staff during illness or economic hardship.

== Awards and honors ==
Alexander has received two Emmy nominations as well as The Canadian Comedy Awards' Chairman's Award, Gilda's Magic Award from Gilda's Club, Chicago Improv Festival Lifetime Achievement Award 2009, The League of Chicago Theatres' 2009 Artistic Leadership Award and named 2009 Arts Chicagoan of the Year by the Chicago Tribune, Crains Who's Who in Chicago Business 2011, Chicago Magazine's Power 100 - 2012. Since acquiring Chicago Second City in 1985, the Second City under Alexander's leadership has been nominated for 154 Jeff Awards and has won 32, and 28 Dora Nominations and 2 wins as well as receiving on behalf of Second City, the Lifetime Achievement Award from Just for Laughs, Spirit of Innovation Award 2011, The Big Shoulders Award 2012 from the Chicago Film Critics and The NAB Spirit of Broadcasting Award 2012, Phi Beta Kappa Distinguished Service Award 2014 and Chicago Fifth Star Award 2016. Governor General Performing Arts Award 2018. On November 18, 2022, Mr. Alexander was inducted into Canada's Comedy Hall of Fame.
