= Poor white trash =

Poor White Trash may refer to:

- Poor White Trash (film), a 2000 film by Michael Addis
- Poor White, an American subculture

== See also ==
- White trash, an American English pejorative term referring to individual or groups of lower social class Caucasian people that the speaker considers to lack social status
