= Kerri Randles =

American actress, writer and producer (born 1971)

- Born: Kerri Lee Randles; June 15, 1971 (age 54); Decatur, Illinois, US
- Occupation(s): Actress, writer and producer

Kerri Lee Randles (born June 15, 1971) is an American actress, writer and producer.

== Biography ==
=== Early life ===
Randles was born in Decatur, Illinois, the daughter of Virginia, a secretary, and Terry, a business owner. She attended the University of Illinois at Chicago with an art scholarship but soon switched her major to Theatre. She studied theatre at Victory Gardens with Steven Ivcich and was part of improv with Mick Napier at the Annoyance Theater. She worked on John Hughes' films, Home Alone and Curly Sue as an extra, before earning a chance to audition in Hollywood for Roseanne.

=== Career ===
Randles' first break came in 1993 when Oliver Stone gave her a bit part in Heaven & Earth, earning Kerri her Screen Actors Guild card. Her first supporting role came in 1994 when she played Missy in the Showtime Rebel Highway series, Jailbreakers, directed by William Friedkin. Subsequent roles after that included Marilyn Monroe, in Introducing Dorothy Dandridge for HBO, directed by Martha Coolidge, Poor White Trash, and Scenes of the Crime. She recently worked with Angelina Jolie on Clint Eastwood's, Changeling.

In June 2010, Randles' brought her one-woman show Can't You Hear Me Knockin? to the stage, opening the first Hollywood Fringe Festival, to rave reviews. Taking over 7 years to develop, her collaboration with renowned stage director, Tony Abatemarco, proved a success. Knockin' hits New York for a limited engagement at Off-Off gem, Manhattan Theatre Source November 2010. A memoir will follow the London production in 2011.

=== Personal life ===
Kerri is also an avid collector of art and is known to produce shows for artists. She collaborated on the Banksy, Barely Legal, Los Angeles show in 2006, and also produced The Sex Lives of Mannequins (Chicago and LA), for Charles Evans, Jr., producer of The Aviator.

== Filmography ==
=== Film ===
Year	Title	Role	Notes
2000	Poor White Trash	Suzy	
2000	Baby Doll Forever	Babydoll	
2001	Scenes of the Crime	Donna	
2001	The Theory of the Leisure Class	Billionaire's Babe 2	
2007	Rails & Ties	Rosanna	
2008	Changeling	Operator	
2010	The Chosen One	Lily	
2013	Amelia's 25th	Betty	

=== Television ===
Year	Title	Role	Notes
1994	Rebel Highway	Missy	Episode: "Jailbreakers / Rebelles"
1999	Introducing Dorothy Dandridge	Marilyn Monroe	Television film
2008	Kath & Kim	Co-Star	Episode: "Sacrifice"
