= Adam Rubin =

American writer

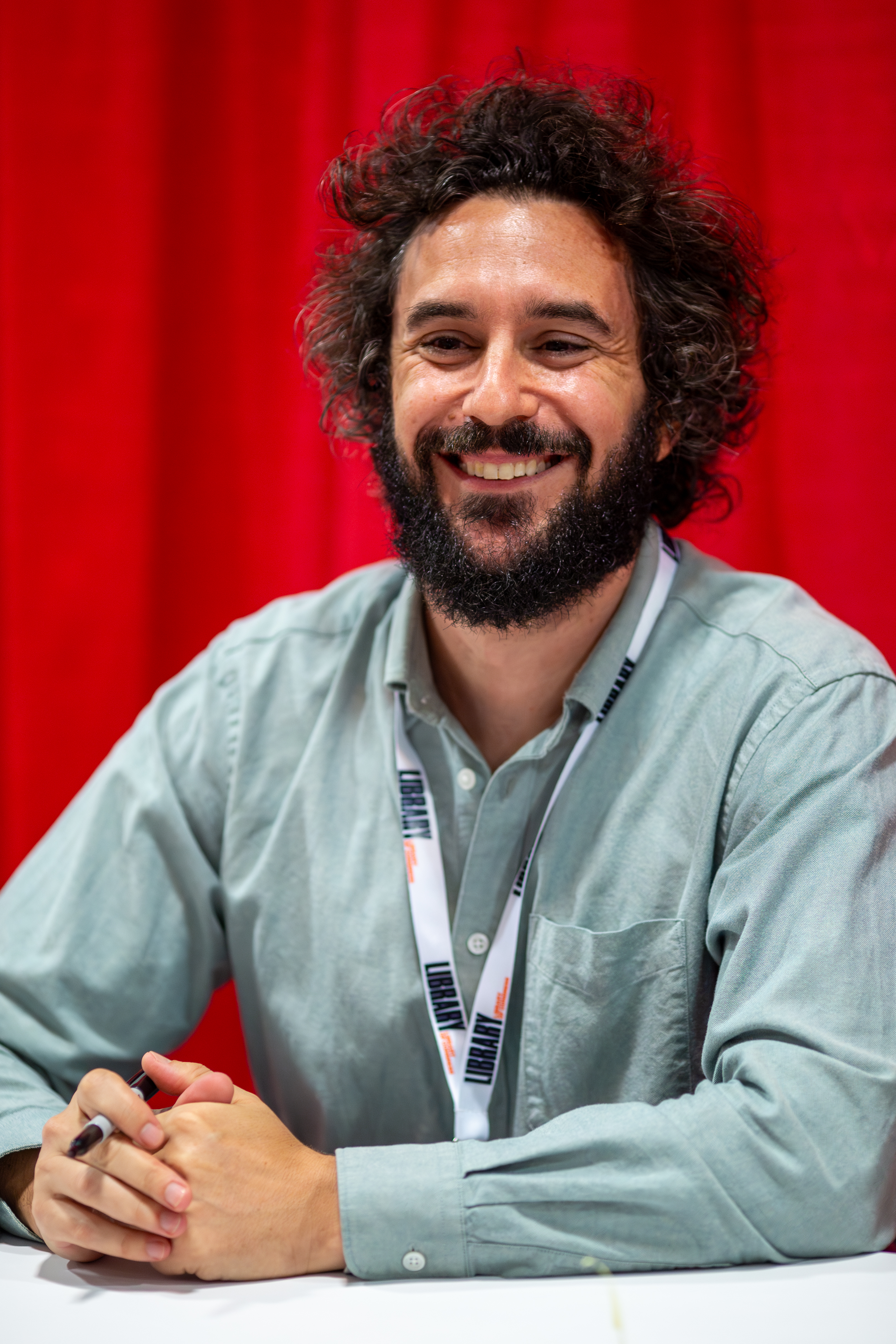
- Born: July 21, 1983
- Education: Sam Fox School of Design & Visual Arts
- Occupation: Writer

Adam Rubin is a Jewish-American author of children's books. Many of his stories feature animals or food and several contain interactive elements. His books have sold over one million copies. Rubin graduated from the Sam Fox School of Design & Visual Arts at Washington University in St. Louis where he studied visual communications and worked as an advertising creative director for ten years before leaving his day job to focus on writing books. Adam also has a background in Improv where he taught classes at iO Theater in Chicago and in New York at the Annoyance Theatre. In addition to writing and improv, he designs puzzles, optical illusions and magic tricks, and is a partner and co-owner of Art of Play, a retailer of puzzles, games and magic-related goods, where he serves as director of puzzles and games.

== Select bibliography ==
- The Human Kaboom, illustrated by Daniel Salmieri, Gracey Zhang, Rodolfo Montalvo, Daniel Gray-Barnett, Marta Altés, and Adam De Souza (Penguin, 2023) ISBN 9780593462393
- Ice Cream Machine, illustrated by Daniel Salmieri, Charles Santoso, Liniers, Emily Hughes, Nicole Miles, and Seaerra Miller (Penguin, 2022) OCLC 1251766374, ISBN 9780593325797
- High Five, illustrated by Daniel Salmieri (Penguin, 2019) ISBN 9780525428893
- El Chupacabras, illustrated by Crash McCreery (Penguin, 2018) ISBN 9780399539299
- Dragons Love Tacos 2: The Sequel, illustrated by Daniel Salmieri (Penguin, 2017) ISBN 9780525428886
- Robo-Sauce, illustrated by Daniel Salmieri (Penguin, 2015) ISBN 9780525428879
- Big Bad Bubble, illustrated by Daniel Salmieri (Houghton Mifflin, 2014) ISBN 9780544045491
- Secret Pizza Party, illustrated by Daniel Salmieri (Penguin, 2013) ISBN 9780803739475
- Dragons Love Tacos, illustrated by Daniel Salmieri (Penguin, 2012) ISBN 9780803736801
- Those Darn Squirrels Fly South, illustrated by Daniel Salmieri (Houghton Mifflin, 2012) ISBN 9780547678238
- Those Darn Squirrels and the Cat Next Door, illustrated by Daniel Salmieri (Houghton Mifflin, 2011) ISBN 9780547429229
- Those Darn Squirrels, illustrated by Daniel Salmieri (Houghton Mifflin, 2008) OCLC 181424019, ISBN 9780547007038

== Awards and honors ==
- 2020 – Texas Bluebonnet Award (winner)
- 2018 – The E.B. White Read Aloud Award (honoree)
