= Tim O'Malley =

Tim O'Malley may refer to:

- Tim O'Malley (politician) (born 1944), Irish politician
- Tim O'Malley (rugby union) (born 1994), New Zealand rugby union player
- Tim O'Malley (actor), author of Godshow
