= Rogers Park (film) =

2017 film

- Directed by: Kyle Henry
- Written by: Carlos Treviño
- Cinematography: Drew Xanthopoulos
- Edited by: John Fecile
- Music by: Curtis Heath
- Release dates: October 2017 (Chicago International Film Festival); April 27, 2018 (United States)
- Running time: 87 minutes
- Country: United States
- Language: English

Rogers Park is a 2017 American drama film written by Carlos Treviño and directed by Kyle Henry. The film, set in the Rogers Park neighborhood of Chicago, follows two couples as they navigate challenges in their personal and professional lives. The film premiered at the 2017 Chicago International Film Festival.

== Plot ==
Grace (Sara Sevigny), who runs a preschool, and her husband, Zeke (Antoine McKay), celebrate a wedding anniversary in the movie's opening; their good time is spoiled by Grace's brother, Chris (Jonny Mars), making a toast that turns into a rant. Chris, who has a chip on his shoulder (one that's too well supplemented by a man bun), is a one-time hot-shot novelist permanently stuck on his second book. His partner, Deena (Christine Horn), a local activist, is getting fed up with him fast.

== Cast ==
- Christine Horn as Deena
- Jonny Mars as Chris
- Antoine McKay as Zeke
- Sara Sevigny as Grace
- Lyric Ross as Ruby

== Reception ==
Rogers Park has received positive review for its writing, acting, and directing. As of June 2018, Rotten Tomatoes shows an approval rating of 100%, but with only 15 reviews. The New York Times described it as a Critics Pick. Matt Fagerholm of RogerEbert.com awarded the film three and a half stars.
