= Scenes of the Crime =

2001 film by Dominique Forma

- DVD cover
- Directed by: Dominique Forma
- Written by: Dominique Forma; Daniel Golka; Amit Mehta
- Produced by: Willie Baer; Marc Frydman; Deborah Lee; Rod Lurie
- Starring: Jeff Bridges; Jon Abrahams; R. Lee Ermey; Mädchen Amick; Morris Chestnut
- Cinematography: James R. Bagdonas
- Edited by: Sidney Levin
- Music by: Christopher Young
- Distributed by: Cinerenta
- Release dates: September 8, 2001 (Deauville); September 30, 2003 (United States)
- Running time: 91 minutes
- Countries: United States; Germany
- Language: English

Scenes of the Crime is a 2001 film directed by Dominique Forma and written by Daniel Golka, Amit Mehta, and Forma. It stars Jon Abrahams, Jeff Bridges, Noah Wyle, R. Lee Ermey, Peter Greene, Mädchen Amick, Morris Chestnut, Bob Gunton, and Brian Goodman.

The film had its world premiere at the Deauville American Film Festival on September 8, 2001, and was released in the United States on DVD on September 30, 2003. It was met with mixed opinions and moderate, but ultimately positive reviews.

== Plot ==
The story revolves around a young driver, Lenny (Abrahams), working for a gangster, running various errands and asking no questions. After the kidnapping of an enemy mobster, Jimmy Berg (Bridges), a bitter feud erupts between the two groups with Lenny caught in the middle. Stuck in a van alone with Berg, surrounded by Berg's men, the otherwise neutral driver is forced to choose a side, but is torn by the decision.

The film envelops the events that take place amongst various characters involved in the Mexican standoff, finally leading to a twist ending that is surprisingly upbeat.

== Cast ==
- Jeff Bridges as Jimmy Berg
- Jon Abrahams as Lenny Burroughs
- R. Lee Ermey as Mr. Parker
- Mädchen Amick as Carmen
- Morris Chestnut as Ray
- Kerri Randles as Donna
- Noah Wyle as Seth
- Henry Rollins as Greg
- Lombardo Boyar as Zeke
- Kenny Johnston as Al
- Peter Greene as Rick
- Bob Gunton as Steven
- Dominic Purcell as Mark
- Robert Wahlberg as Arnon
- Brian Goodman as Trevor
- Nicholas Gonzalez as Marty
- Justin Louis as Louis
- Mizuo Peck as Sharon
- Chase Ellison as Blake Berg
