= Good Morning Gitmo =

Good Morning Gitmo is a one-act play written by American comedians Mishu Hilmy and Eric Simon in 2014. Hilmy and Simon were hired by the Annoyance Theater to create a dark comedy and agitprop play about the United States Detention Center at Guantanamo Bay. The story takes place decades into the future in the warden’s office, where he converted it into a makeshift television studio.

== Characters ==
The characters, as they are listed in the script:

- Colonel John Bogdan III — the aging warden and host of Good Morning Gitmo
- Brian "Bear" Burroughs — the Head Guard of Camp Delta
- Stu — an emotionally broken guard, who hosts a dated pop culture segment, "The Scoop with Stu"
- Maureen Dallas — a conservative book author visiting the island to promote her book
- Cory Maltese — a pop music icon visiting the island to discuss his album
- Lilly Judd — a Hollywood starlet visiting the island to promote her movie
- Guleed Hassan Ahmed — the silent and emasculated co-host of the show
- Ramul Ahmed — a detainee in charge of the morning crafts segment, also referred to as ISN91572
- Yahyah — a well behaved detainee who performs stand-up comedy

== Plot ==
Setting: Colonel John Bogdan the Third’s personal office and a utility closet converted into a green room.

Length: 55 minutes

Summary: The play takes places several decades into the future and Guantanamo Bay is still opened. As years have gone by and the media has stopped reporting on the detention center, funding vanished. Without a budget, the staff is stranded on the island in meager conditions without rotations or leaves of absence. Due to this, Bogdan creates a morning talk show to simulate what life was like off the island. It is his attempt to keep staff and detainees in line, as well as prevent himself from going insane.

Everything occurs on the morning of 11 September 2039. It is the first time actual guests from the mainland of the United States are visiting the island. Hoping to use this opportunity to get these media figures to help spread the word about Guantanamo Bay, after each interview the warden pleads for the celebrity guests help. When he does not get the reaction he wants he dejectedly moves onto a new segment. Throughout the play, detainees perform segments such as morning crafts and stand up comedy which display the reprehensible conditions of the prison. The show is punctuated by soliloquies revealing each characters own personal inner prison.

== Performance history ==
Good Morning Gitmo was first performed at the Annoyance Theater in Chicago, Illinois in 2014. Opening previews for the show began on Patriot Day (September 11). The world premiere was on September 25. The original production was directed by Kyle Dolan and its cast consisted of Neal Dandade, James Freetly, Mike Geraghty, Mishu Hilmy, April Hutter, Anna Irving, Adam Levin, Eric Simon, and JP Thomas.

The play was developed and devised by the ensemble using improvisation. Mike Geraghty crafted all of Yahyah's stand-up comedy material. After 55 days, Mishu Hilmy and Eric Simon completed writing the script. Currently, The Annoyance Theater owns the rights to Good Morning Gitmo.

In remembrance of 9/11, Playbill listed the work as one of 13 shows inspired by the tragedies of the September 11 terrorist attacks, their aftermath, and the rebuilding of America.

== Reception ==
The show received mixed and negative reviews. Justin Hayford of the Chicago Reader stated, "The few pointed moments in Eric Simon and Mishu Hilmy's diluted social satire show how great things might have been." Hayford, however, complimented parts of the show as being, "harrowing, hilarious stuff." David Menke, a Fox Nation commentator, called the show a "disgusting so called comedy about GTMO." He went on to write, "We have these comedians attacking our detention center. Good Morning Gitmo, well maybe they should wake up and see what they're doing is wrong."
