= Kim "Howard" Johnson =

American author and actor (born 1955)

- Born: August 6, 1955 (age 71); Ottawa, Illinois, U.S.
- Occupation: Author

Kim "Howard" Johnson (born August 6, 1955) is an American author and actor.

== Career ==
Johnson started his writing career as co-editor of a student magazine titled The Blue Goldfish at Ottawa Township High School. He is now the author of several books related to Monty Python as well as other nonfiction volumes. Johnson was the publisher of a Monty Python fanzine when he first met the members of the troupe in 1978. During the 1980s, Johnson studied improv under Del Close during the founding days of Improv Olympic (now iO) and would go on to publish two books on Close - Truth in Comedy: The Manual of Improvisation (1994) and The Funniest One in the Room: The Lives and Legends of Del Close (2008).

In addition to his writing, Johnson has taught comedy at the iO theater in Chicago and has pursued acting for both stage and screen. He has appeared in several theater productions with Walt Willey in and around their mutual hometown of Ottawa, Illinois. Johnson has also appeared in two films by director Marc Wilkinson: the 2012 short drama The October Crisis and a 2016 horror-comedy satirizing the teen drama programs of the 1990s titled Autumn Bluffs. Currently, he teaches comedy online at The Comedy Lab.

== Notable works ==
- The First 20 Years of Monty Python (1989)
- And Now for Something Completely Trivial: The Monty Python Trivia and Quiz Book (1991)
- Life (Before and) After Monty Python: The Solo Flights of the Flying Circus (1993)
- Truth in Comedy: The Manual of Improvisation (1994) as editor
- The First 28 Years of Monty Python (1999)
- Monty Python's Tunisian Holiday: My Life with Brian (2008)
- The Funniest One in the Room: The Lives and Legends of Del Close (2008)
