= Michael Addis =

American comedian

- Occupations: Television and film director
- Children: James Addis, Charlie Addis
- Website: www.michaeladdis.com

Michael Addis is a comedic television and film director who has made his mark in hidden camera comedy and reality-style comedy.

Addis' debut feature, Poor White Trash (starring Jaime Pressly and Sean Young) was an underground hit in 2000 that ended up making three times its budget.

His feature documentary Heckler premiered at the 2007 Tribeca Film Festival (garnering a two-page NY Times spread) and had its West Coast premiere at the AFI Film Festival in November 2007.

Michael was also the showrunner of the TV hit "Impractical Jokers." He was the Executive Producer of the BET hit comedy series, Hell Date. He has produced and directed on The Showbiz Show with David Spade, as well as Extreme Makeover: Home Edition, The Swan, Minding the Store and The New Tom Green Show. Addis has also written for The Man Show and The Skateboard Show. He produced and directed the stand-up special Jamie Kennedy: Unwashed, which he sold to Comedy Central. He also worked as a director on "Lewis Black's Root of All Evil.

Michael is a member of the DGA and is represented by Puraj Puri at Paradigm Talent Agency.
