= How to Speak Hip =

Studio album by Del Close and John Brent
- Released: 1961
- Genre: Comedy
- Length: 36:37

How to Speak Hip is a comedy album by Del Close and John Brent, released by Mercury Records in 1961.

== Description ==
The album is designed as a satire of language-learning records, where the secret language of the 'hipster' is treated as a foreign language. Part of the joke, however, is that it actually does a good job of describing the Beat Generation/Beatnik sub-culture: Basic concepts such as "cool" and "uncool" are taught, as well as vocabulary building ("dig", "dig it", "dig yourself, baby", "dig the chick", "dig the cat", "What a drag!").

Many of the phrases and expressions survived to become elements of the counterculture vocabulary.

Social notes are presented as for many language courses, and later in the album, the teacher (Close) is taken on field trips into the secret life of the hipster (Brent). However, the hipster rebels against participating in the teaching tool, leading to a humorously compromised teaching style.

Side one
No.	Title	Length
1.	"Introduction"	1'14"
2.	"Basic Hip"	1'13"
3.	"Vocabulary Building"	4'15"
4.	"The Loose Wig"	2'48"
5.	"The Riff"	6'19"
6.	"The Hang Up"	3'17"

Side two
No.	Title	Length
7.	"Put On, Put Down, Come On, Come Down, Bring Down"	6'42"
8.	"Cool"	3'53"
9.	"Uncool"	1'02"
10.	"Field Trip No1"	1'37"
11.	"Field Trip No2"	1'19"
12.	"Field Trip No3"	1'22"
13.	"Summary"	1'26"

Track 12 contains an excerpt of 'We Free Kings' by Rahsaan Roland Kirk. The album came with a booklet expanding on the concepts discussed in the album, providing a supplementary reading list, and so on.

The album was illustrated in a style of line drawing popular throughout the 50s (similar to the early commercial work of Andy Warhol). The woodcuts used as illustrations on the LP were stolen from Close's Chicago apartment in the 1980s.

== Context ==
An interest with hipster slang had been present in the mainstream culture since the late-30s/1940s when jazz music became a popular form. Cab Calloway released a recording of a song called the "Hepsters Dictionary" in 1938 (along with a published booklet). In the film Song of the Thin Man from 1947 the "straight" Nick and Nora have trouble following the jargon of the jazz musicians in the story.

During the 1950s, as people became conscious of the Beat Generation phenomena, amid fears of juvenile delinquency, there was an increased urgency to understand the language spoken by the new youth culture.

== Influences ==
Brian Wilson can be heard fondly mentioning this album in the box set The Pet Sounds Sessions during the highlights of the recording sessions of the song "Hang On to Your Ego". The full working title for the album track "Let's Go Away for Awhile" was "Let's Go Away for Awhile (And Then We'll Have World Peace)," the parenthetical being an allusion to the album.

Dimitri from Paris sampled the opening of the album on the first track of his album Sacrebleu.

Loop Guru sampled from the album in its 2006 release Elderberry Shiftglass, as did Hans Dulfer on his 1994 album Big Boy.

Deadmau5 used excerpts from 'Uncool' on his track, "Sometimes I Fail", from the album Get Scraped. It was used again on his track "GH-XSW" (or "GH", as named on At Play Vol. 4).

The albums Kaleidoscope by DJ Food and U.S.S.R. Life from the Other Side by DJ Vadim extensively sample 'The Riff' and 'Dig Yourself Baby!' respectively; coincidentally, both albums were released on the Ninja Tune label.

Hip-hop composer 2 Mello samples the album extensively in "Diggin' It Baby", from his 2018 album Memories of Tokyo-To, using catchphrases like 'Dig Yourself Baby!' as refrains, as well as featuring extended clips of dialogue between Close and Brent at the start and bridge of the song.

The album was also sampled by the electronic group KLO.
