= Antoine McKay =

American actor, director and educator (born 1970)

Antoine McKay (born August 10, 1970) is an American actor, director, and educator who is best known for his roles as Bunkie in Empire and Uncle Spike in South Side.

== Early life ==
McKay was born in Inkster, Michigan to Ivory and Jelena McKay. McKay, who was the second of four children, attended St. Aloysius Elementary and graduated from Wayne Memorial High School. McKay later attended Eastern Michigan University, where he studied theater.

== Career ==
McKay developed an interest in performing early in life, but it wasn’t until he saw his older brother perform in a high school version of Oklahoma that he was finally inspired to pursue acting. McKay performed on Second City’s Main Stages in Detroit and later relocated to Chicago where he performed alongside actors like Keegan-Michael Key, Nyima Funk, Josh Funk and Marc Evan. McKay has also been a frequent performer and contributor to Chicago's Under the Gun Theater, performing alongside Mishu Hilmy.

== Personal life ==
McKay is a longtime resident of Chicago. He is a father of six children (Noah, Bailey, Zachary, Sadie, Hannah, and Elijah).

== Filmography ==
- God's Country (movie) (2026)
- South Side (TV series) (2019, 2021-2022)
- Rogers Park (movie) (2018)
- Keeping Up with the Joneses (movie) (2016)
- He Sends Rain (movie) (2015)
- Sense8 (TV Series) (2015)
- 24/7 (movie) (2015)
- The Don't We Boys: Sketch Corp. (TV movie) (2015)
- Resurrecting McGinn(s) (2015)
- Empire (2015 TV series) (2015)
- The Drunk (2014)
- Review (TV series) (2014)
- Mind Games (TV series) (2014)
- Cauliflower Man (2014)
- Boss (TV Series) (2012)
- Detroit 1-8-7 (TV Series) (2010)
- Osso Bucco (2008)
- Sports Action Team (TV Series) (2006, 2007)
- Prison Break (TV Series) (2005, 2006)
- I Want Someone to Eat Cheese With (2006)
- The Weather Man—Passing Pedestrian (2005)
- Secrets of Fenville (2003)
- Standing in the Shadows of Motown (documentary) (2002)
