= I Want Someone to Eat Cheese With =

- Theatrical release poster
- Directed by: Jeff Garlin
- Written by: Jeff Garlin
- Produced by: Jeff Garlin; Erin O'Malley; Steve Pink
- Starring: Jeff Garlin; Sarah Silverman; Bonnie Hunt; David Pasquesi; Mina Kolb
- Cinematography: Peter Biagi
- Edited by: Steven Rasch
- Music by: Rob Kolson
- Production company: The Weinstein Company
- Distributed by: IFC Films
- Release dates: April 28, 2006 (Tribeca); September 5, 2007 (United States)
- Running time: 80 minutes
- Country: United States
- Language: English
- Budget: $1.5 million
- Box office: $194,568

I Want Someone to Eat Cheese With is a 2006 American independent romantic comedy film written, produced, directed by, and starring Jeff Garlin, also featuring Sarah Silverman and Bonnie Hunt. Many improv veterans of Chicago's Second City and even its 1950s predecessor Compass Players appear, as well as Chicago radio personality Steve Dahl in a cameo.

== Plot ==
Overweight, depressed improv actor James is a Second City cast member in Chicago. He lives with his mother and cheats on his diet. He quits his acting job on a sleazy television prank show after they fool someone into believing he has a daughter.

James' girlfriend Andrea breaks up with him, and his agent Herb dumps him. When he visits his friend's daughter's elementary school for Career Day, he rambles about his problems, boring the kids, and embarrassing himself in front of the teacher, Stella.

James relaxes in the evenings by lying on the hood of his car parked "in a great spot" beside Wrigley Field, and during the days by walking around the North Side of Chicago with his friend Luca, appreciating the buildings.

While wearing a pirate costume for a hot dog stand, James hears about a Chicago-based remake of Paddy Chayefsky's 1955 Marty, his favorite film, and one that mirrors his adult life. He knows the director but cannot get an audition. After walking out on his Compulsive Eaters Anonymous meeting, James goes to an ice cream parlor, where he meets "big-time hottie" Beth, who recognizes him from Second City and offers him free ice cream. She asks him an obscurely lewd question, which she then cheerfully explains.

James, smitten, returns to the shop, where Beth takes him on adventures, including a shopping trip for her to try on underwear. They meet later after one of his comedy performances. One thing leads to another, and Beth volunteers to return to James's (and his mother's) apartment, where they have sex.

A day later, Beth succinctly dispatches James when he shows up at her apartment. Beth explains that she had just never been with a fat guy. Meanwhile, his role in Marty is given to a clueless young actor, real-life teen idol Aaron Carter.

As the story ends, James moves to his own apartment. He reconnects with Stella, the elementary school teacher, and continues acting.

== Cast ==
- Jeff Garlin as James Aaron
- Sarah Silverman as Beth
- Bonnie Hunt as Stella Lewis
- Amy Sedaris as Ms. Clark
- David Pasquesi as Luca
- Mina Kolb as Mrs. Aaron
- Wallace Langham as Claude Clochet
- Joey Slotnick as Larry
- Richard Kind as Herb Hope
- Rebecca Sage Allen as Andrea Hope
- Roger Bart as Burl Canasta
- Dan Castellaneta as Dick
- Elle Fanning as Penelope
- Tim Kazurinsky as Bill Bjango
- Paul Mazursky as Charlie Perlman
- Steve Dahl (cameo) as Father
- Aaron Carter as himself as Marty
- Gina Gershon as herself as Marty's mother
- Alumni of the Second City
- Compass Players

== Production and distribution ==
"Garlin struggled to find financing, which twice fell through. He shot it in 18 days, but those days were spread out over two years," reported the Associated Press. IFC Films released the film on a non-traditional schedule, called "IFC First Take", part of IFC in Theaters. It appeared on pay-per-view cable television simultaneously with a limited theatrical release, in September 2007. The DVD followed about seven months later, April 15, 2008. In the meantime, IFC made a deal with Blockbuster, giving the video chain 60 days of exclusive rental and video on demand rights on each film. During interviews on Late Night with Conan O'Brien and Wait Wait… Don't Tell Me!, Garlin said that the title bothers Larry David because it ends in a preposition.

== Critical reception ==
On the review aggregator website Rotten Tomatoes, 73% of 49 critics' reviews are positive, with an average rating of 6.5/10. The website's consensus reads: "This quirky romantic comedy's realistic depiction of a lonely guy looking for love is sure to please fans of Curb Your Enthusiasm's Jeff Garlin." Metacritic, which uses a weighted average, assigned the film a score of 60 out of 100, based on 18 critics, indicating "mixed or average" reviews.

The New York Times called the "rambling" film "laid back and affectionate". In an appreciative review, Chicago-based Roger Ebert called it "a minor movie, but a big-time minor movie... If there is such a thing as a must-see three-star movie, here it is." However, John Maynard in The Washington Post scorned the movie, writing, "A better awkward title would be 'Random Events of a Failed Actor Plodding the Streets of Chicago.'"
