= The Second City's Next Comedy Legend =

- Genre: Reality television Game show Comedy
- Presented by: Trish Stratus
- Judges: Mick Napier; Elvira Kurt; Joe Flaherty; Dave Thomas
- Country of origin: Canada
- Original language: English
- No. of seasons: 1
- No. of episodes: 8

Production
- Executive producers: Morgan Elliott; Andrew Alexander

Original release
- Network: CBC Television
- Release: July 10 – August 28, 2007

Related
- SCTV

The Second City's Next Comedy Legend is a reality show that aired on Canada's CBC Television in 2007. Contestants improvise and create characters for their chance to win a spot on the Second City Canadian Touring Company.

Judges are Joe Flaherty, Mick Napier, Dave Thomas and Elvira Kurt and the show is hosted by Trish Stratus. Current Second City Toronto performers Matt Baram, Paul Bates, Anand Rajaram and Naomi Snieckus act as mentors. The show is co-executive produced by Second City CEO Andrew Alexander and producer Morgan Elliot.

Auditions for the 2007 show took place March 20 in Vancouver, March 24 in Calgary, March 27 in Halifax and April 4 in Toronto.

The show premiered on July 10, 2007.

== See also ==
- The Second City
- Second City Television
