= Deborah Kimmett =

Canadian writer and comedian

- Occupations: writer, comedian
- Writing career
- Period: 1980s-present
- Notable work: Miracle Mother

Deborah Kimmett is a Canadian writer and comedian.

== Biography ==
Originally from Napanee, Ontario, she was a member of The Second City's Toronto cast in the 1980s, and appeared as a stage actress in productions of Norm Foster's Windfall, Lawrence Jeffery's Precipice and Don Ferguson's Skin Deep. She later wrote several plays, including Broken Record, Last Respects and Miracle Mother, and one-woman shows including Dorothy Lawton: Unplugged, Overboard and North of Normal.

Miracle Mother was a shortlisted nominee for the Governor General's Award for English-language drama at the 1995 Governor General's Awards.

Kimmett has also published the humor books Reality Is Overrated and That Which Doesn't Kill You Makes You Funnier and the novel Outrunning Crazy, and is an online author of the Seven Minute Writer Tool Kit. She holds on line writing workshops for creative writers. She has made 26 guest appearances on the CBC Radio comedy series The Debaters, is a regular at the Winnipeg Comedy Festival and on CBC Radio One's Definitely Not the Opera. and works as a motivational speaker teaching organizations how to deal with change. She and Lee Anne McAlear host a regular podcast called Improv: The Heart of Innovation.
