= John Brent (comedian) =

American improv comedian, actor and beat poet

John Brent (14 March 1938, in Madison, Connecticut – 16 August 1985, in Los Angeles) was an American comedian, actor and beat poet.

He was part of the Second City comedy club, and then later The Committee. He is mainly known for being half the duo behind the 1959 How To Speak Hip comedy album with Del Close. Otherwise he recorded and published little, since he died at a relatively young age. He also appeared as an actor in such films as Bob & Carol & Ted & Alice, Catch-22, Steelyard Blues, and American Graffiti.

Brent's son, Jeremy Paz, resides in San Francisco. He owns and operates Question Mark Tavern, which has a barroom called The Hip Pocket dedicated to his father and the How to Speak Hip album.

== Filmography ==
=== Film ===
Year	Title	Role	Notes
1963	Greenwich Village Story	Poet	
1969	Bob & Carol & Ted & Alice	Dave	
1970	Catch-22	Cathcart's Receptionist	
1972	The Candidate		
1973	Steelyard Blues	Tattoo Parlor Man	
1973	American Graffiti	Car Salesman	
1979	More American Graffiti	Ralph	
1980	Porklips Now	Head Butcher	Short Film
1980	First Family	U.N. Official #2	

=== Television ===
Year	Title	Role	Notes
1981	WKRP in Cincinnati	Buzzy	Episode: "Straight from the Heart"
1983	Laverne & Shirley	Shasta	Episode: "Defective Ballet"
1985	The History of White People in America		TV movie; final role
