= Performink =

PerformInk
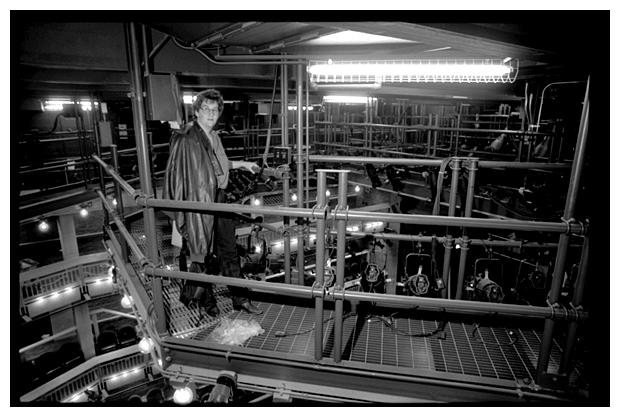
- Carrie Kaufman in the rafters at The Chicago Shakespeare Theater
- Owner: Lotus Theatricals LLC
- Founder: Carrie Kaufman
- Publisher: Jason Epperson
- Managing editor: Abigail Trabue
- Founded: 1992
- Ceased publication: 2009
- Relaunched: 2016
- Website: www.perform.ink

PerformInk is a Chicago theater and entertainment industry website, which began in 1989 as a bi-weekly newspaper. It included show openings and reviews, audition listings, and industry and union news for Chicago actors, directors, dancers, designers, and other entertainment professionals.

== History ==
PerformInk started a bi-weekly trade paper for the theatre and film industries as a quarterly newsletter in 1987 in the back of Act I Bookstore. Sometime in 1989, the owner of the bookstore, Rick Levine, started printing on a bi-weekly basis and on newsprint. Carrie Kaufman was hired in June 1990 as a typist for 10 hours a week. By the end of 1990, Levine presented Carrie with the ultimatum of either making the paper profitable by the end of 1991 or closing the presses on it. It didn't make a profit that year, but it did almost triple its revenues and by the end of 1991, they were negotiating a purchase. In February 1992, PerformInk, Inc., headed by Kaufman, was created. On June 19, 2009, PerformInk published its final print edition as it switched to an all-online format. By November 2011, PerformInk published its last web update. On March 23, 2016, the website re-launched under the new ownership of Lotus Theatricals LLC, headed by Chicago theater professionals Jason Epperson and Abigail Trabue when Kaufman transferred the publications rights to them.

== Contents of newspaper ==
Performink provided a wide range of news and information for professionals in the Chicago theatre industry. Theatre news, theatre business and Chicago industry personalities were just a few of the areas covered and discussed in each issue. Subjects affecting the careers of not only Chicago performers, but also directors, producers, designers, filmmakers and dancers were always PerformInk's focus.

There were regular columns discussing specific facets of business for theater professionals. These columns include "Money and Taxes", which looked at tax and financial matters unique to the business of performing, by Greg Mermel, CPA; "Comedy Bites," which looked at the improv industry in Chicago; and "Out Takes," a behind the scenes look at independent film in Chicago. PerformInk was one of the primary sources for actors to get information regarding auditions. The print edition of PerformInk had a readership of over 12,000, about half of which were subscribers.

PerformInk also printed "The Book: An Actor's Guide to Chicago." The Book contained information about the business of living as an actor in Chicago, in addition to acting as a directory of services and products for industry professionals.
