= Art of Play =

Home goods store in Brooklyn, New York

Coordinates: 40°41′29″N 73°59′53″W

Art of Play is a Brooklyn-based home goods store.

== Mascot ==
Art of Play has a mascot named Molly, an yellow bird autonoma modelled after an American goldfinch.

== Reception ==
The New York Times referred to Art of Play as a "cabinet of curiosities".

=== Kelly Clarkson feud ===
American Idol winner and celebrity Kelly Clarkson entered the store on October 10, 2026. During an exchange with a clerk, she requested to buy Molly, which the clerk informed her was not for sale. Clarkson then made a social media post accusing Art of Play of disrespect, and later posted that there had been a price tag on the model listing it for $15 thousand, but that the store clarified that was for a similar model by the same artist and later raised the price to $15 million. Following the post, store owners told the Brooklyn Eagle that they began receiving threats.
