= IO Theater =

Improv theater and training center in Chicago, Illinois

Coordinates: 41.9085°N 87.6517°W

- Interactive map of IO Theater
- Address: Chicago, Los Angeles; United States
- Type: Improv theater
- Event: Comedy

Construction
- Opened: 1981

iO, or iO Chicago, (formerly known as ImprovOlympic) is an improv theater and training center in central Chicago. The theater teaches and hosts performances of improvisational comedy. It was founded in 1981 by Del Close and Charna Halpern. The theater has many notable alumni, including Amy Poehler and Stephen Colbert.

The iO Theater formerly had a branch in Los Angeles called iO West (1997–2018), and in Raleigh, North Carolina called iO South. The Chicago center closed briefly in 2020, but reopened on November 3, 2022.

== History ==
=== Early years ===
The ImprovOlympic was created in 1981 as the brainchild of David Shepherd who originally created the format in 1972 in New York with Howard Jerome. David Shepherd used the Theater Games, created earlier by Viola Spolin, as a way for teams of improvisational comic actors to compete. The first ImprovOlympic classes and shows took place at The Players Workshop in Chicago, where Charna Halpern was an improv student. Charna Halpern became David Shepherd's assistant, and eventually the producer of the competitions. There were also competitions at a network of local bars and clubs.

In 1982, the ImprovOlympic moved from The Players Workshop to its own space at Thomas Goodman's CrossCurrents theatre, 3207 N. Wilton Street. Teams began to form out of every major improv troupe in Chicago. Shows began shifting to a long-form approach by 1983.

In 1995, the ImprovOlympic moved to its location on Clark St. in Chicago.

=== iO West ===
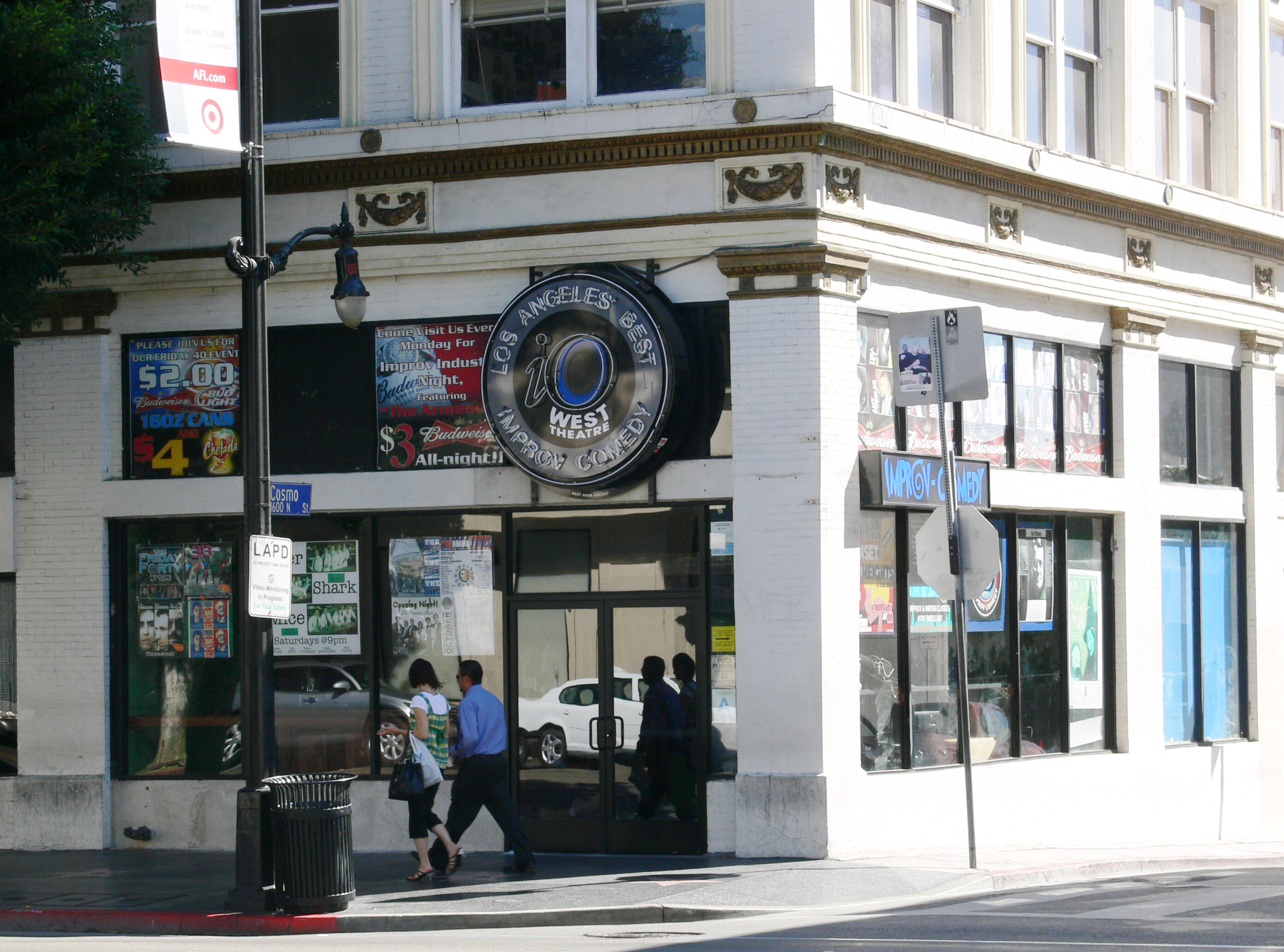
iO West Theatre on Hollywood Boulevard

An additional theater, iO West, was opened by Paul Vaillancourt in Los Angeles, California in 1997. The theater originally took up residence at The Stella Adler Theater (6773 Hollywood Boulevard), then The Complex Theater (6470 Santa Monica Boulevard), before finally moving into a new purpose-built space in the Palmer Building (6366 Hollywood Blvd) in 2000. The theater was home to the Los Angeles Improv Comedy Festival. It was managed by Colleen Doyle and Zach Huddleston, before closing on February 24, 2018.

=== Name change ===
In 2001, the International Olympic Committee legally threatened the theater over its use of the name "ImprovOlympic" and the name was subsequently changed to "iO". On September 2, 2005, iO held its 25th anniversary show at the Chicago Theatre in downtown Chicago. The wireless microphones went dead shortly into the show, so the improvisers played using wired mics for the rest of the performance. Celebrity veterans of the iO program who returned to play included Mike Myers, Tim Meadows, Amy Poehler, and Ike Barinholtz. The opening to the Harold piece performed was conducted by the most veteran iO house team, The Reckoning. A DVD of The Reckoning is included in the book Art By Committee a sequel to Truth in Comedy.

In August 2014, after almost 20 years in Chicago's Wrigleyville neighborhood, Charna Halpern bought a building in the Lincoln Park neighborhood and moved the iO Theater to its new home at 1501 N. Kingsbury St.

=== Closure and reopening ===
On June 18, 2020, it was announced that iO would be closing permanently. Controversy ensued regarding whether the closure was due to financial difficulties or allegations of racism that had emerged in the form of an online petition that began circulating only a few days before. Halpern stressed that the reasons were strictly financial, highlighting the property taxes bills of nearly $100,000 that "would have had to come out of her personal savings" as the theater was not making any income as a result of the COVID-19 pandemic and acknowledging that, if not for the pandemic, she would not be closing. "I'm 68 years old," she said. "It's scary for me. We're in a pandemic right now and there's no end in sight. Even if we were able to open at half capacity it was not going to work."

In July 2021 the theater was bought by Scott Gendell and Larry Weiner of Chicago. The duo stated their intention to resume shows and classes at the theater, which was due to reopen on November 3, 2022.

In October 2026 a new sketch comedy team called Dumball Machine joined the iO Theater. Other comedy teams, such as Improvised Shakespeare Chicago also appear regularly.

== Notable alumni ==
This includes people who have performed or taught at either iO West or iO Chicago:

- Stephen Colbert
- Chris Farley
- Tina Fey
- Kate Flannery
- Bill Hader
- Seth Meyers
- Mike Myers
- Amy Poehler
- Jason Sudeikis
- Vince Vaughn
- Bob Odenkirk
- Scott Adsit
- Vanessa Bayer
- Matt Besser
- Maria Blasucci
- Paul Brittain
- Kipleigh Brown
- Aidy Bryant
- Kay Cannon
- Wyatt Cenac
- Andy Dick
- Kevin Dorff
- Rachel Dratch
- Jon Favreau
- Neil Flynn
- Rich Fulcher
- Peter Gwinn
- TJ Jagodowski
- Angela Kinsey
- David Koechner
- Steve Little
- John Lutz
- Jack McBrayer
- Adam McKay
- Tim Meadows
- Susan Messing
- Jerry Minor
- Joel Murray
- Mick Napier
- Masi Oka
- David Pasquesi
- Danny Pudi
- Andy Richter
- Rick Roman
- Mitch Rouse
- Eric Stonestreet
- Cecily Strong
- Stephnie Weir
- Susie Youssef

== See also ==
- Annoyance Theatre
- The Groundlings
- The Second City
- Under the Gun Theater
- Upright Citizens Brigade
