= Co-Ed Prison Sluts =

Musical revue

- Music: Faith Soloway
- Lyrics: Faith Soloway
- Premiere: April 1989: Annoyance Theatre, Chicago, Illinois
- Productions: 1989 Chicago; 1998 Toronto; 2008 Chicago

Co-Ed Prison Sluts is a musical revue that originally opened at the Annoyance Theatre in April 1989, closed in June 2000, and reopened in 2008, making it the longest-running musical in Chicago, Illinois, a title that still holds to this day.

The show was directed by Mick Napier with original music by Faith Soloway. The show is known for having been an important part of the Chicago fringe theater.

== Plot ==
Co-Ed Prison Sluts follows the prison's newest inmate, Alice, as she learns the ropes from the other inane inmates including Hamster Man, The Dame, Skeeter, Slick, Henry, and Dr. Bellows and his dog Fluffy. And she learns the number one rule — to fear the dreaded Clown.

Thanks to songs such as "Hey We're in Prison" and "The Dog is Eating my Hamster Now", Co-ed Prison Sluts is known for its risqué themes, and has helped forged The Annoyance's tradition of raunchy, edgy comedy.

== Return ==
In 2008, the flagship show for The Annoyance returned to its new stage, on 4830 N. Broadway, as the final event in the celebration of its 20th anniversary. Due to sell out crowds, and positive reviews, the show has now been officially given an open run, continuing its tradition of the longest-running musical in Chicago.

== Cast ==
The current cast includes:

- Brittany Handler as Alice
- Jimmy Pennington as Henry
- Jennifer Estlin as Dame Toulouse
- Jason Earl Folks as Slick
- Charley Carroll as Skeeter
- Kellen Terrett as Hamster Man
- Chris Kervick as Dr. Bellows
- Lee Russell as Clown
- Ken Manthey as Warden

- Directed by Mick Napier
- Original music by Faith Soloway
- Musical Director: Lisa McQueen

The Original Cast Included:

- Susan Messing as Alice
- Bob Fisher as Henry
- Ellen Stoneking as Dame Toulouse
- Ed Furman as Slick
- Mark Sutton as Skeeter
- Kellen Terrett as Hamster Man
- Tom Booker as Dr. Bellows
- John Harrizal as Clown
- Frank Kentra as Warden
