= Charna Halpern =

American comedian (born 1952)

- Born: June 1, 1952 (age 74); Chicago, Illinois, U.S.
- Occupations: Improvisation teacher, writer
- Years active: 1980–present

Charna Halpern (born June 1, 1952) is an American comedian who cofounded iO theater with Del Close.

== Early life ==
Halpern graduated from Southern Illinois University in 1974 with a major in English and Speech. Following graduation, she worked for a juvenile delinquency school.

== Career ==
Halpern moved home to Dixon, Illinois after college, where she worked for a McDonalds owned by her father and interviewed locals to promote the franchise, leading to a job on a radio show.

Halpern met Del Close in 1981, and they later held competitive improv tournaments under the iO brand and adapted a long-form improvisational style that Close had been creating over the years called the Harold. In 1995, Close and Halpern decided to acquire a more permanent location in 1995 by Wrigley field. iO West opened in 1997 in Los Angeles. Following Close's death, the theater lost one of its largest assets. By the COVID-19 pandemic, iO was drowning in debt, including a $100,000 property tax.

Halpern and iO also came under criticism after a student in California reported harassment by a director. Others who had interacted with the theater, historically, had claimed instances of racism by the theater as an institution and individual racism by Halpern. In 2020, Halpern listed the theater's building for sale.
