= Poor White Trash =

- DVD cover
- Directed by: Michael Addis
- Written by: Michael Addis; Tony Urban
- Produced by: Lorena David
- Starring: Sean Young; Jason London; Jaime Pressly; William Devane
- Music by: Tree Adams
- Distributed by: Hollywood Independents; Xenon Entertainment Group
- Release date: June 16, 2000
- Running time: 89 minutes
- Country: United States
- Language: English

Poor White Trash is a crime-comedy film directed by Michael Addis. The film was released on June 16, 2000, and was distributed jointly by Hollywood Independents and the Xenon Group. The film stars an ensemble cast of actors, including Jaime Pressly and others, most of them before they became famous. The film was filmed in Benton and Du Quoin, Illinois; many extras in the film were local residents of the towns.

== Plot ==
Mike Bronco believes a degree from Southern Illinois University Carbondale is a ticket out of life in a trailer park. He is determined to rise above his humble southern Illinois roots and broken home to become a clinical family therapist. His best friend, Lynard "Lennie" Lake, has a simpler vision for the future. He is a firecracker enthusiast whose notion of the American dream is trucking school.

One day, fun-loving Lennie convinces the serious-minded Mike to shoplift "Near Beer" and enjoy a carefree afternoon of kicking back. The seemingly harmless exploit snowballs into an exploding Vega (an ill-conceived distraction), injuring store owner Ken Kenworthy and enraging his aggressive son Rickey. The two offenders land in Jackson County Court and Mike's dreams of an exodus to the middle class and Lenny's trucking career are threatened. As this transpires, Mike's mother, Linda Bronco, finds she has plenty to contemplate beyond paying rent. She still grapples with how her youthful indiscretions cost her a career in nursing; her would-be Pro-Wrestler husband, Jim, abruptly leaves and she loses her job at a local nursing home. Although her life's burdens hit Linda hard, Hell will freeze over before she allows the worst to befall Mike and Lenny. Even with no money at their disposal, the Broncos and Lennie believe at first that it will take a competent, sober lawyer to keep Mike's record clean and college-ready.

Next, the boys devise an ironic solution: a few trailer burglaries to raise the money to hire lawyer Ron Lake, Lennie's oily, turquoise-laden, ex-con grandfather, to take their case. When Linda catches the boys in the middle of a burglary, she steadfastly resolves to help them out, provided their spoils will finance Mike's college tuition. As the situation grows more desperate, the boys' worst fears are realized when Linda's 20-something boyfriend comes along for the ride. The boyfriend, Brian Ross, is the town sheriff's son and a former high school football star and bully. As if it were not bad enough that Brian resumed tormenting and menacing Mike and Lenny, his ceaseless passion for ex-flame Sandy Lake complicates their already-complex plan. Sandy, who just happens to be Ron's post-adolescent trophy wife (and Lennie's step-grandmother to boot), has bad intentions in mind for the boys. She sees their predicament as an easy opportunity to launch her own manipulative agenda.

During their bizarre journey to redemption and the promise of a better life, the boys throw all caution and common sense to the wind. With Mike's mom in tow, they execute a series of outrageously plotted trailer park burglaries. With bigger threats and growing confidence, the boys move on to bigger hits at the nursing home and a fast food restaurant. Then things really spin out of control with several repeat visits to court, massive explosions, guns, fire, and to top it all off, a spectacular car/trailer chase with $250,000 in loot at stake. Not surprisingly, they are also hurled into the paths of the most colorful characters in Sunrise, Illinois, including: Suzi and Suzy, a pair of damaged-but-lovable townies; the crusty and outspoken Judge Pike; Carlton Rasmeth, an inept alcoholic defense counselor; Machado, an ambitious right wing prosecutor; not to mention a host of good ole boys and girls who have various plans for Mike and Lenny that have nothing to do with higher education.

Despite the insanity, Mike and Lennie learn significant growing-up lessons in the most hilarious ways. While they tear through the highways, cornfields, and courthouses of America's heartland, their bonds of friendship and trust grow stronger. Through zany trials and instances of mistaken identity, they endure many indignities, life-threatening situations, temptations, and embarrassments. But they survive, determined to emerge with dignity, self-respect, and an unyielding sense of humor.

== Cast ==
- Tony Denman as Mike Bronco
- Sean Young as Linda Bronco, Mike's mother
- Bob Koherr as Jim Bronco, Mike's father
- Jacob Tierney as Lynard "Lennie" Lake, Mike's best friend
- William Devane as Ron Lake, Lennie's grandfather
- Jaime Pressly as Sandy Lake, Ron's wife
- M. Emmet Walsh as Judge Pike
- Tim Kazurinsky as Carlton Rasmeth, an inept defense attorney
- Richard Livingston as Prosecutor Machado
- Charles Solomon Jr. as Bailiff
- Doug MacHugh as Sheriff Ross
- Todd Babcock as Deputy Haggard
- Fred Belford as Officer Landaur
- Michael Addis as Officer White
- Jason London as Brian Ross, the sheriff's son
- Craig Patton as Ken Kenworthy
- Patrick Renna as Rickey Kenworthy, Ken's son
- Danielle Harris as Suzi
- Kerri Randles as Suzy

== Production ==
=== Development ===
The idea for the movie was conceived by Tony Urban who pitched it to eventual director Michael Addis via email. Although Urban lived in Pennsylvania and Addis in California, the duo teamed up to write the script, and didn't meet in person until the day before filming commenced.

=== Controversies ===
The film was shot in the cities of Benton and Du Quoin, Illinois; many local residents, who appeared as extras, were told the film was a coming-of-age story about two rural teenagers with the title Goodbye Summer. After the announcement that the film was to be released under the title Poor White Trash, the mayors of both cities sent letters to the filmmakers objecting to it and requesting that it be titled differently.

== Reception ==
On Rotten Tomatoes, the film has an approval rating of 60% based on reviews from 10 critics. The sites consensus is: Poor White Trash was "silly and over-the-top, but not very funny." On Metacritic, the film has a score of 23% based on reviews from 4 critics, indicating "generally unfavorable reviews".

The most positive review (40% or 4 out of 10) on the site is from Luke Y. Thompson of New Times LA, who wrote that "Hilarity should ensue, but doesn't." The worst review (6% or 6 out of 100) comes from Kevin Maynard of Mr. Showbiz, who wrote that he'd "rather go on an all crisco diet than sit through PWT again".

On the film review site AllMovie, there is no written review but it has been scored by the site, receiving two stars out of five.
