= League of Chicago Theatres =

American alliance of theaters

The League of Chicago Theatres (LCT) is an alliance of theaters in Chicago. It was founded in 1979.

The League of Chicago Theatres worked with Collaboraction, NAMI Chicago, and Season of Concern in 2020 to create a mental wellness PSA campaign for theatre workers.

Due to the advocacy work of On Our Team, the League of Chicago Theatres added a pay transparency rule to their job site in March 2020.
