= Mina Kolb =

American actress

- Born: Mina E. Kolb; June 7, 1926 (age 100); Wilmette, Illinois, U.S.
- Education: New Trier High School; Mundelein College; Loyola University Chicago
- Occupation: Actress
- Years active: 1952–2006
- Spouse(s): William McMurray Jr. (m. 1957)
- Awards: Lifetime Achievement Award from Chicago Improv Festival

Mina E. Kolb (born June 7, 1926) is an American actress, known for her work on television, film and improvisational theater. She was a founding member of The Second City Comedy troupe and has appeared in numerous television series and films over several decades.

== Early life and career ==
Born in Wilmette, Illinois to Joseph Kolb and Evelyn McCarthy, Kolb was raised in a large Catholic family with six siblings. She attended New Trier High School, Mundelein College, and Loyola University.

Kolb began her entertainment career co-hosting the local Chicago television show Rayner Shine, where she and co-host Ray Rayner lip-synced to records while teenagers danced.

In 1959, she joined the original ensemble of The Second City in Chicago alongside performers such as Howard Alk, Roger Bowen, Severn Darden, Andrew Duncan, Barbara Harris and Eugene Troobnick. In 1961, Kolb moved to Los Angeles to appear on the CBS sitcom Pete and Gladys, portraying the character Peggy Briggs. Throughout her career, Kolb appeared in various television series including Three's Company as Mrs. Alden, Curb Your Enthusiasm as Jeff Greene's mother, Santa Barbara as Mrs. Batterfield, Generations as Aunt Mary and Ellen when she played the role of a nurse. Her films credits includes: The Hollywood Knights (2008), A Mighty Wind (2003) and I Want Someone to Eat Cheese With (2006).

She also performed on stage, notably in the Broadway productions of From The Second City (1968) and in Something Different. In recognition of her contributions to improvisational theater, Kolb received a Lifetime Achievement Award from the Chicago Improv Festival in 2004.

== Personal life ==
Kolb married advertising executive William McMurray Jr in 1957.

== Filmography ==
Movies and TV Shows
Year	Title	Role	Note
2006	I Want Someone to Eat Cheese With	Mrs. Aaron	
2005	Hopeless Pictures	Hope	voice
2003	A Mighty Wind	Dr. Mildred Wickes	
2000–2002	Curb Your Enthusiasm	Jeff Greene's mother	5 episodes
1999	Two Guys, a Girl and a Pizza Place	Flower Seller	1 episode
1997–1998	George & Leo	Frieda	3 episodes
1997	The Jeff Foxworthy Show	Clara Kopell	1 episode
1996	High Incident		1 episode
1996	The Secret World of Alex Mack	Abigail Hoffman	1 episode
1996	Sisters	Betty Pryor	1 episode
1996	Ellen	Nurse	1 episode
1995	Not Like Us	Mrs. Anderson	TV Movie
1995	Bye Bye Love	Dorothy	
1993	Love & War	Marion	1 episode
1991	P.S.I. Luv U	Mrs. DiPaggio	1 episode
1991	Dangerous Woman	Lil	11 episodes
1991	Life Goes On	Dotty	1 episode
1991	David Rules	Mrs. Higgins	1 episode
1989–1991	Generations	Mary Gardner	46 episodes
1990	1st & Ten	Housewife	1 episode
1990	Parker Lewis Can't Lose	Aunt Celia	1 episode
1990	Thirtysomething	Florence	1 episode
1989	Wedding Band	Neighborhood Lady	
1989	She's Out of Control	Mrs. Pearson	
1989	Knots Landing	Neighborhood	1 episode
1988	Santa Barbara	Mrs. Batterfield	1 episode
1988	It's Garry Shandling's Show	Rose Wachs	1 episode
1983–1987	Scarecrow and Mrs. King	Emma Stadish	2 episodes
1986	The Twilight Zone	Mrs. Taylor	1 episode
1986	Tall Tales & Legends	Widow Bleacher	1 episode
1985	Benson	Suzie	1 episode
1984	Young Lust	Beatrice Hoving	
1984	Back Together	Mrs. Burke	TV Movie
1981–1983	Three's Company	Mrs. Alden	3 episodes
1983	The Jeffersons	Mrs. Colby	1 episode
1983	Mama's Family	The Clerk	1 episode
1980	HealtH	Iris Bell	
1980	The Hollywood Knights	Dudley's mother	
1972	Every Little Crook and Nanny	Ida	
1970	Loving	Diane	
1968	What's So Bad About Feeling Good?	Woman in Pad	Uncredited
1961–1962	Pete and Gladys	Peggy Briggs	6 episodes
1952	Skirts Ahoy!	Wave C.P.O.	Uncredited
