= Kelly Leonard =

American author, public speaker and theater producer (born 1966)

Kelly Leonard (born 1966) is an author, public speaker and theater producer. He is the son of radio personality Roy Leonard.

== The Second City ==
In 1988, Leonard started working in the kitchen of The Second City, a Chicago comedy theater. He later became the executive vice president and president of theatricals and oversaw and led the expansion of the comedy troupe in the 1990s and 2000s. Leonard was also responsible for hiring Tina Fey, Stephen Colbert, Amy Poehler, and Steve Carell to perform there.

In 2015, he stepped down from the day-to-day management of The Second City.

In 2017, Leonard became the "executive director of insights and applied improvisation", overseeing a partnership with the Booth School of Business (University of Chicago) to study behavioral science through the lens of improvisation.

== Writing and other endeavors ==
In 2015, Leonard's first book "Yes And", co-written with Tom Yorton, was published by Harper Collins.

He also hosts the podcast, "Getting to Yes, And" for Second City Works, The Second City's business-to-business subsidiary, and WGN Radio.

He is a noted authority in the creative application of improvisation and comedy to business and has spoken at The Aspen Ideas Festival, TEDxBroadway and Chicago Ideas Week as well as for companies like Microsoft, Coca-Cola and DDB Worldwide.
