= Susan Messing =

American actress (born 1963)

- Born: December 26, 1963 (age 61); Perth Amboy, New Jersey
- Occupations: Actress, Director, Comedian, Author, Teacher
- Years active: 1980–present
- Known for: Annoyance Theater; The Second City iO Theater
- Notable work: Co-Ed Prison Sluts; Messing with a Friend

Susan Messing (born December 26, 1963) is an American improvisational theatre performer, teacher and author associated with the Annoyance Theater and iO Theater in Chicago.

== Career ==
A New Jersey native, Susan Messing graduated from Northwestern University with a degree in theater. Following graduation, she began performing improvisation at iO Theater, where she appeared on the Harold team Blue Velveeta. In 1998, she was hired as a performer on The Second City mainstage.

Messing is an ensemble member of Annoyance Theater where she performed in "Co-ed Prison Sluts," "The Miss Vagina Pageant," "The Real Live Brady Bunch" as well as directing What Every Girl Should Know... An Ode to Judy Blume (based on the work of Judy Blume).

She has performed on NBC's Late Friday and Comedy Central's Premium Blend along with her puppet Jolly after showcasing at the HBO/US Comedy Arts Festival in Aspen. She also voiced the character "Eos" in the 2001 video game Red Faction.

== The Annoyance Theater ==
Susan is a founding member of The Annoyance Theater (1989) where she has created roles in over thirty original productions including Co-Ed Prison Sluts (the longest-running musical in Chicago), That Darn Anti-Christ, The Real Live Brady Bunch and the famed Judy Blume adaptation, What Every Girl Should Know. Other shows include The Miss Vagina Pageant and Your Butt, among others. She is regarded as one of Chicago's finest improvisers—male or female by Tribune reporter Kevin Pang.

Messing was cited as “Best Improviser” in the Chicago Reader's 2008 Best Of Chicago issue, and is currently running a show at The Annoyance Theater called Messing with a Friend. The evening includes guests improvisers from the iO Theater, Second City, and The Annoyance Theater. In a favorable review, Ryan Hubbard of the Chicago Reader wrote that her skill improvising with others, "…is a testament to her congeniality, experience, and broad intelligence." She can also be seen improvising in the shows Molly alongside Second City director Norm Holly at iO every Tuesday night and The Boys alongside Rachael Mason at The Second City on every Friday night.

== Teaching ==
Susan teaches and performs at the Annoyance Theater and the iO Theater. She also teaches improvisational comedy for DePaul University, The University of Chicago and Loyola University.

As a writer, her essays have been published in The Second City Almanac of Improvisation and in Charna Halpern's book, Art By Committee and endorsed Jon Jon Lannen's book The Giraffe That Taught Me How To Laugh.

Susan married former Saturday Night Live and Sesame Street writer Michael Clayton McCarthy on September 30, 2012. McCarthy died on April 8, 2020.
