= Annoyance Theatre =

Chicago theatre group

Coordinates: 41.9398°N 87.6513°W

The Annoyance Theatre, or Annoyance Productions, is a theatre and associated ensemble based in Chicago, Illinois, that deals mainly in absurd and outrageous humor. Many people who have performed with the ensemble have gone on to become successful stage and screen actors. Popular productions have included Co-Ed Prison Sluts and That Darned Antichrist. Annoyance Productions currently runs classes in improvisation, writing, musical improvisation, acting, and solo work.

== History ==
The Annoyance Theatre was founded by Mick Napier as "Metraform" in 1987 and changed its name to the Annoyance after moving into a new building in 1989. The Annoyance moved again in 1994 to a theater on the 3700 block of North Clark Street, where it would remain for six years. In 2000 the Annoyance was forced to move out so the building could be demolished to make room for a temporary parking lot for nearby Wrigley Field, which was later the site of a mixed commercial/residential building containing a Blockbuster Video. At the time of its closing in 2000, Co-Ed Prison Sluts, a musical comedy with a frequently rotating cast, was the longest-running musical comedy in Chicago, having played for 11 years. The Annoyance took up residence in a new building in 2002, and signed a lease for an Uptown location in 2004.

In 2013 the theatre announced that they would be moving from their Uptown Chicago location to their current home at 851 W. Belmont in the Lakeview district of Chicago.

== Past productions ==
In 1992 the Annoyance opened a show called The Real Live Brady Bunch, in which a troupe of performers, with an eye toward irony, acted out entire episodes of the 1960s and '70s family sitcom The Brady Bunch. The show was hugely successful, riding the wave of 1970s nostalgia that came in part to define the 1990s and continues to this day. What Every Girl Should Know... An Ode to Judy Blume was another popular show and even gained the respect and approval of author Judy Blume. Throughout the late 1990s iconic film director John Waters and comedian Charlie Callas made appearances at the Annoyance.

The Annoyance opened a new theatre and bar in July 2006 in the Uptown area of Chicago. That location opened with a production of President Bush is a Great Man, directed by Mick Napier.

In October 2006, the theatre revived their very first show, Splatter Theatre, first performed in 1987. This has become a Halloween tradition at the theater.

In July 2008, the theater revived their flagship show, Co-Ed Prison Sluts, first performed in April 1988. September 2014, the Annoyance Theater produced Good Morning Gitmo, a one act comedy by Mishu Hilmy and Eric Simon about Guantanamo Bay Detention Center.

The last performance at the Uptown theatre location was on August 24, 2013. The first performance at the Belmont space was Napier's Invisible World on Saturday May 24, 2014 and the company continues to produce original material created by their own ensemble.

In February 2015, the theatre produced the Gobbler’s Knob: Groundhog Day Spectacular, an annual variety show celebrating Groundhog's Day. The show was created by Tom Troup and Christopher Kervick and starred Tim Heurlin as the mayor of Punxsutawney, PA.

== Notable alumni ==
- Ike Barinholtz, MADtv cast member
- Vanessa Bayer, Saturday Night Live cast member
- Aidy Bryant, Saturday Night Live cast member
- Beth Cahill, Saturday Night Live cast member
- Stephen Colbert, television host
- Dick Costolo, Twitter's former CEO
- Martin de Maat, teacher
- Paul Dinello, Strangers with Candy actor and director
- Jon Favreau, actor, writer, and director
- Kate Flannery, The Office actor
- Jeff Garlin, Curb Your Enthusiasm actor and producer
- Melanie Hutsell, Saturday Night Live cast member
- Lisa Lewis, actress/voiceover artist
- Jane Lynch, actress and comedian
- Susan Messing, Late Friday comedian
- Mick Napier, Exit 57 director
- Conner O'Malley, writer, performer
- David Pasquesi, actor
- Ray Quinn, musician
- Kerri Randles, actress
- Andy Richter, Late Night with Conan O'Brien co-host and actor
- Adam Rubin, author
- Amy Sedaris, Strangers with Candy actor
- Faith Soloway, musician
- Joey Soloway, Six Feet Under writer and producer
- Jason Sudeikis, Saturday Night Live cast member
- Matt Walsh, Upright Citizen's Brigade actor
- Chris Witaske, actor
- James Asmus, writer Marvel Comics

== See also ==
- Improvisational theatre
- List of improvisational theatre companies
