= Bekka Eaton =

Comedian

Bekka Eaton, the current Director of Theater at Miami University Hamilton in Hamilton, Ohio, got her start as part of the improvisational comedy troupe The Second City in Chicago. She went on to be cast as the Female disc jockey in Sixteen Candles and a larger role as Delta Burke's sister in the TV movie Day-O. She is also the founder of the Greater Cincinnati teen improvisational group Dot. Comedy.

== Early life and education ==
Eaten attended Fairfield High School. She received her undergraduate degree from Northwestern University and her master's degree from Indiana University Bloomington. Bekka led the Philadelphia area band, The Daves, which released one album on the Pyramid label in 1988. The Daves were composed of Bekka Eaton: vocals and trombone, Mike Mennies: keyboards and vocals, Jim Ericson: guitar and vocals, Jerry Getz bass and vocals (replaced by Garry Lee in 1988), and Ronny Crawford: drums. While they were one of the premier local Philadelphia club bands, they distinguished themselves with their touring schedule which took them from Chicago to South Carolina. Their multi-week-long stints at the Windjammer (Isle of Palms, South Carolina) were legendary for their overflow audiences. Their motto was "Music Is Fun", and some of their stage props were made by noted painter Ron Crawford.
