= Godshow =

Play by Tim O'Malley

External audio
- Interview on WGN radio

Poster for Godshow

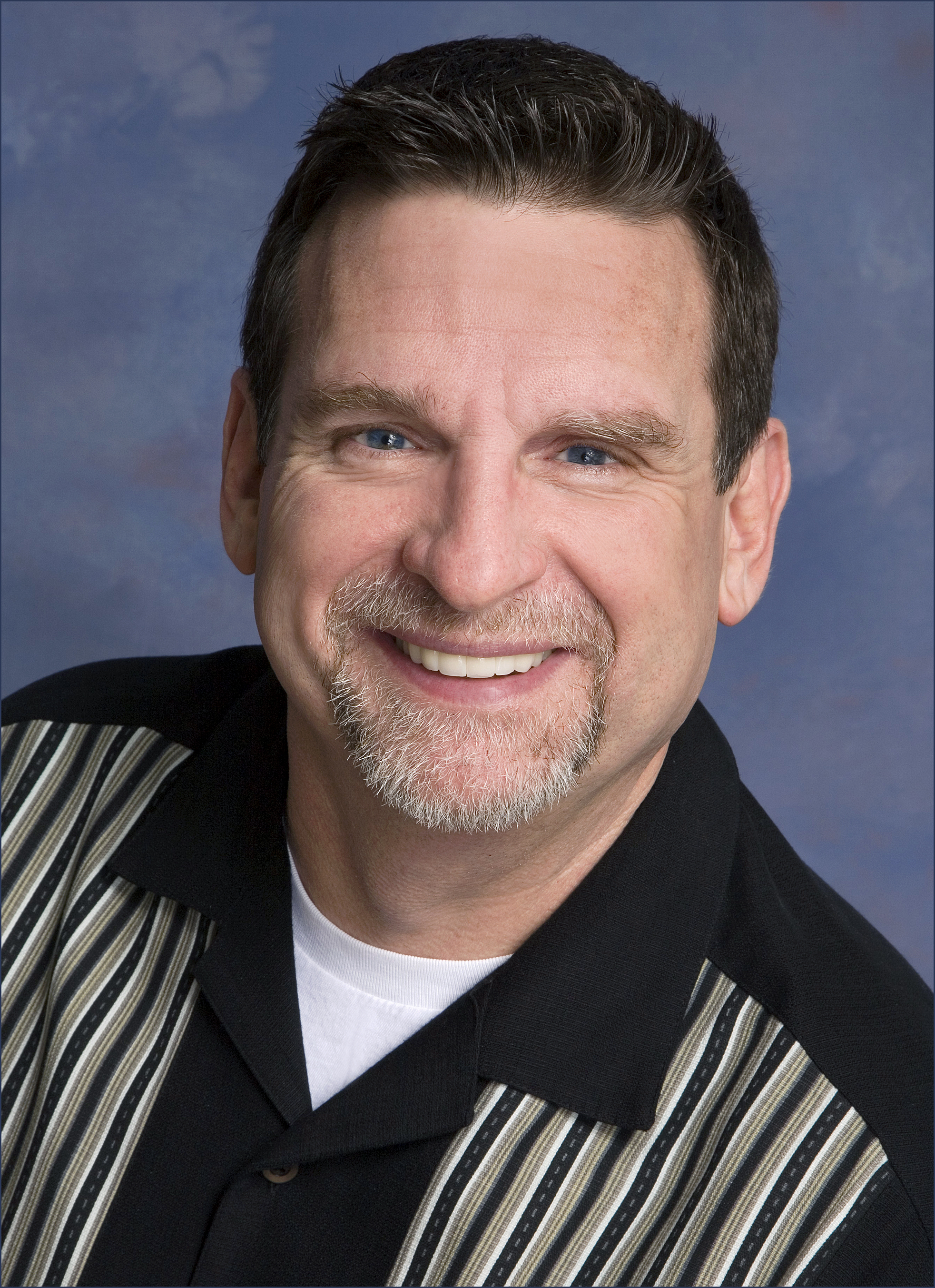
Tim O'Malley in 2007

Godshow is an autobiographical play written and starred by Tim O'Malley.

Godshow is the story of actor Tim O'Malley's life at Chicago's The Second City Theater in the 90's. The show covers O'Malley's battle with bitterness, alcoholism, and cocaine addiction, back to his life through recovery and his stage, feature film and television success.

Between 2003 and 2006, Godshow had sold-out runs at Second City Chicago and the Improv Olympics, as well as sold-out performances at the Beverley Arts Center in 2003 and 2004. It was featured on WTTW's Artbeat Chicago, was a Chicago Reader "Theatre Critic's Choice" in 2004, and was number two in the Chicago Sun Times "Top Ten Cool Things to Do" in January 2004.
