= Mick Napier =

American director and actor

- Born: December 12, 1962 (age 63); Hazard, Kentucky, U.S.
- Occupation: actor/director/teacher/author
- Known for: Annoyance Theater; The Second City
- Notable work: Co-Ed Prison Sluts; Exit 57; Fatty Drives the Bus
- Awards: Jeff Award

Mick Napier (born December 12, 1962) is an American director and improvisational theater teacher. He is the founder and artistic director of the Annoyance Theatre and a director at The Second City. He has directed Stephen Colbert, Tina Fey, Rachel Dratch, Horatio Sanz, Nia Vardalos, Andy Richter, Jeff Garlin, and David Sedaris.

== Career ==
Napier directed the Comedy Central Cable Ace nominated show Exit 57 and the Troma film Fatty Drives the Bus which also featured notable Chicago improvisers and actors still living and working there today, including Susan Messing, Joe Bill and Mark Sutton. In 2008, Fatty Drives the Bus landed on several cult top ten lists such as Liberal Dead which wrote, "...a weird cross of 70’s era exploitation and comedy rolled up in a nice little blasphemy laced package."

He founded The Annoyance with the philosophy that training improvisers to be individually powerful is the best way to support those with whom one improvises, an answer to the Yes, And philosophy, which he found led to weak, polite improvisation more often than powerful, good improvisation, a subject that he elaborates on in his book, Improvise: Scene from the Inside Out.

In August, 1999, Napier contributed to R. O’Donnell’s TV show R. Rated, which aired midnights on Fox, Chicago. It included several of his animated shorts and other video works from the Annoyance Theater featuring himself, Rachel Dratch (Saturday Night Live), and Stephnie Weir (MADtv).

Napier's wrote his handbook guide for students of improvisation, Improvise:Scene from the Inside Out in 2002. In it, he challenges 'The Rules' of improv that many students first learn. Napier argues that these 'Rules' are not only not helpful, but actually destructive to the process of creating good improv. Adhering to 'The Rules' can leave improvisers powerless to play, and as such, does not necessarily mean that it will lead to a good scene. In this book, Napier suggests that a different approach is essential to creating good improv. Napier argues, rather, that improvisers should 1) Do something, 2) Check out what you did, and 3)Hold onto what you did.

In 2008, he directed a revival of the classic Annoyance show Co-Ed Prison Sluts: The Musical, the longest running musical in Chicago. Chicago Tribune theater critic Chris Jones expressed the cultural impact of the show stating, "A lot of people, the very same people who now dominate comedy, television and even how many Americans get their politics, took comfort in how “Co-Ed Prison Sluts” attracted nightly lines that stretched for a full Chicago block. For 11 consecutive years (take that, “Wicked”). And so they stuck around here, and built a scene."

Napier is an Artistic Consultant to The Second City and recently directed their 50th anniversary mainstage show. He has directed several other revues, notably including "Red Scare" and "Paradigm Lost" for which he received a Jeff Award. He also teaches Advanced Improvisation at The Annoyance, the final level of the improv comedy training program.

Napier performs weekly in the partially nude improv show entitled Skinprov at The Annoyance. Skinprov, which he also directed, is a weekly show whereby a bunch of men strip to their undies and stay in a state of undress for the entire show, and, according to Timeout Chicago's blog, "...Horny bachelorettes love this". He also makes numerous guest appearances at improv shows staged throughout the city.

He also served as a judge on The Second City's Next Comedy Legend on the CBC.

Napier attended Indiana University Bloomington.

== Stage director ==
Although Napier has directed numerous shows at The Annoyance theater, he has also directed many other productions not affiliated with the theater including David Sedaris' off-Broadway Obie award-winning One-Woman Shoe, more than 15 The Second City revues including the award-winning Paradigm Lost, Martin Short & Friends, and Jeff Garlin's one-man show I Want Someone to Eat Cheese With.

In the fall of 2009, Napier directed the 50th Anniversary show for The Second City.
