= List of improvisational theater festivals =

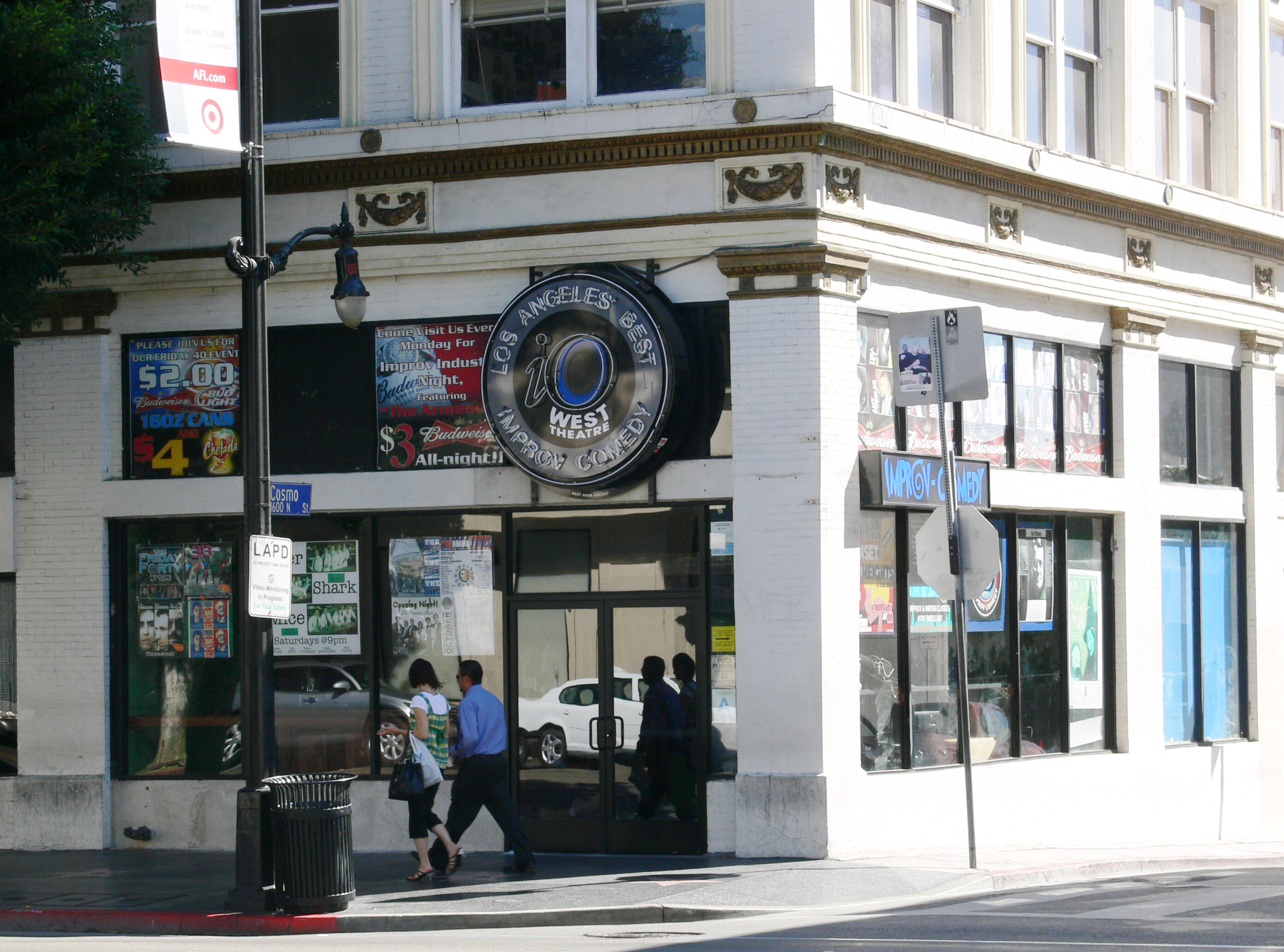
The I.O. West theater, the site of the Los Angeles Improv Comedy Festival.

Improvisational-theater festivals, also known as improv-comedy festivals or improv festivals, are venues where multiple improvisational-theater groups perform.

They are usually not limited by improvisational style, though they may limit entrants to professional-only or collegiate-only.

Most improvisational-theater festivals are hosted by a single troupe, but others are hosted by conglomerations of troupes or a company set up solely for that given festival.

== Festivals ==
Name	Host	Location	Date Established	Reference
The Del Close Marathon	Upright Citizens Brigade Theatre	New York City, New York	1999	
Out of Bounds Comedy Festival	Out of Bounds Comedy Festival	Austin, Texas, United States	2002	
Baltimore Improv Festival	Baltimore Improv Group	Baltimore, Maryland	2006	
New Zealand Improv Festival	New Zealand Improv Trust	Wellington, New Zealand	2008	
Manila Improv Festival	SPIT & Third World Improv	Manila, Philippines	2012	
Oslo Impro Festival	Impro Neuf	Oslo, Norway	2017	
Hoopla Improv Marathon	Hoopla Impro	London, United Kingdom	2017	
Hoopla UK & Ireland Improv Festival	Hoopla Impro	London, United Kingdom	2019	

== College Improv Festivals ==
Name	Host	Location	Date Established	Reference
The Laugh Riot Festival	Harvard University	Cambridge, Massachusetts	1986	
The National College Comedy Festival	Skidmore College	Saratoga Springs, New York	1990	
ImprovFest	Georgetown Improv Association	Washington, D.C.	1997	
Fracas! Improv Festival	Second Nature Improv	Los Angeles, California	2004	
College Improv Tournament (CIT)	Chicago Improv Productions	Chicago	2007	
Bellwether Improv Comedy Festival	Ohio State University	Columbus, Ohio	2010	
Coup de Comedy Festival	UC, Irvine	Irvine California	2013	
Universities Near Illinois College Improv Festival (UNICIF)	University of Illinois-Urbana	Urbana, Illinois	2020/2021	
Utah Collegiate Improv Festival	Utah Valley University	Orem, Utah	2022	
Happy Valley XL Fest	State College, PA	Centre County, Pennsylvania	2022	
Laughin' in the Sip	University of Mississippi	Oxford, MS	2024	
Promedy at iO Theater	The iO Theater	Chicago, Illinois	2024	
Improv LSU College Improv Festival	Louisiana State University	Baton Rouge, Louisiana	2026	

== See also ==
- List of festivals
- List of improvisational theatre companies
