= Matt Gourley =

American actor, comedian, and podcaster (born 1973)

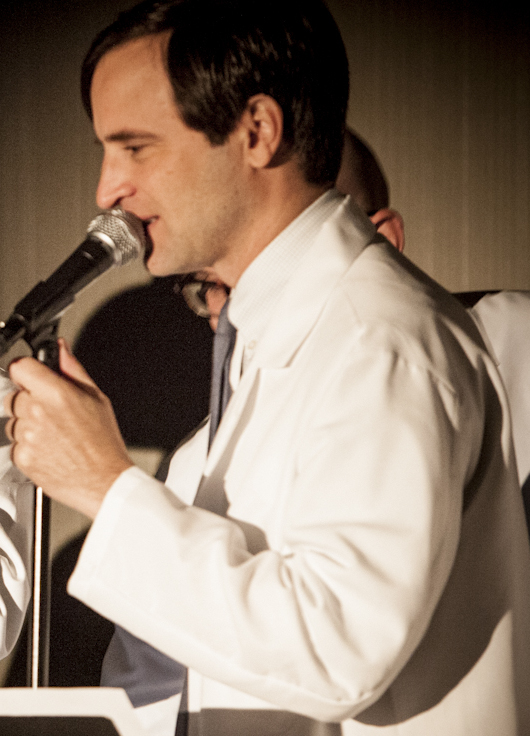
- Gourley during a live performance of Superego at the LA Podcast Festival in 2012
- Born: Matthew James Gourley; May 23, 1973 (age 53); Whittier, California, U.S.
- Education: California State University, Long Beach (MFA)
- Occupations: Actor; comedian; podcaster; teacher
- Years active: 1995–present
- Spouse: Amanda Lund (m. 2017)
- Children: 2

Matthew James Gourley (born May 23, 1973) is an American actor, comedian, and podcaster best known for his work on the Superego, Conan O'Brien Needs a Friend podcasts, and Drunk History, as well as a stint as a spokesperson in US Volkswagen commercials. On Conan O'Brien Needs a Friend he is known for his banter (often poking fun at Conan O'Brien) with CONAF co-host Sona Movsesian and his comedic riffs and bits with host Conan O'Brien, which often include references to Presidents, retired game show hosts, film, and 20th-century-era TV shows.

== Early life ==
Matthew James Gourley was born and raised in Whittier, California, by his mother Welford. His father is Jim Gourley. He was named after Marshal Matt Dillon, a character from the radio and television show Gunsmoke.

== Career ==
=== Theater and improv ===
Gourley graduated from California State University, Long Beach, with a bachelor's degree in technical theater and an MFA in performance.

Gourley has acted in, directed, and worked on the technical side of productions in the Los Angeles area since the early 1990s, including as Curly in Of Mice and Men, Antipholus in The Comedy of Errors, Dogberry's henchman in Much Ado About Nothing, Orville in The Doctor In Spite of Himself, Hal in Loot, Brindsley in Black Comedy, the director of Tooth and Nail at the Little Fish Theatre, and as a set/lighting designer on The Complete Works of William Shakespeare (abridged). Gourley did video work and set design for multiple productions of Fellowship!.

Gourley began performing with ComedySportz in Los Angeles during elementary school. He met Jeremy Carter at a ComedySportz tournament in San Jose in the mid-90s. He spent years as an actor and improviser at various Disney theme parks along with Carter and Mark McConville, among others. Gourley has also performed at Second City, ImprovOlympic, and the Upright Citizens Brigade Theatre.

==== Teaching ====
Gourley has taught theater and improvisation at Riverside City College, Long Beach City College, and College of the Canyons. He has also led workshops on Shakespearean improv at the Fracas! Improv Festival.

=== Television ===
Gourley and Carter were founding contributors to Channel 101, producing and starring in the "retro futuristic action spectacular" Ultraforce. Ultraforce lasted three episodes and also featured Derek Mears, Jeff B. Davis, and Chris Tallman.

Gourley appeared in the late 90s on Kwik Witz, an Improvisational comedy program on NBC. At this time, he was one of the "mileage mules" employed by Steve Belkin, one of Kwik Witz' producers who later became a travel entrepreneur.

In 2013, Gourley sold a pilot titled Wunderland that he wrote with his then-girlfriend and now-wife, Amanda Lund, to Fox. The series was a workplace comedy loosely based upon the time Gourley and Lund spent working as actors at Disney theme parks, though it did not end up getting produced. This pilot can be heard recorded on the Dead Pilot's Society Podcast's 3rd episode. Gourley has appeared on Community, HarmonQuest, Ghost Ghirls, and Drunk History, as well as doing voice work for Adventure Time.

==== Commercials ====
Gourley's best known commercial work is his position as a spokesperson for Volkswagen in 2014 and 2015. He has also appeared in ads for McDonald's, Carlton Draught, Lowe's, Hewlett-Packard, Hyundai, Xbox, Late Night with Conan O'Brien, and Budweiser.

=== Podcasts ===
In 2006, Gourley and Carter launched Superego, an improvisational podcast they conceived of on Christmas Eve 2005 based on the conceit of clinical case studies. Superego has since added Mark McConville, Jeff Crocker, and Paul F. Tompkins as regular cast members.

In September 2013, Gourley started hosting a podcast along with Matt Mira titled James Bonding on the Nerdist network, later acquired by the Earwolf podcast network. The podcast discusses the James Bond films one by one with guests. In November 2014, Gourley helped launch the new Wolfpop podcast network, a sister to Earwolf, along with Paul Scheer and Adam Sachs. As part of this launch, Gourley himself began a new podcast, titled I Was There Too, which focuses on the actors and stories behind the most classic scenes from film and television. Gourley also co-hosted The Andy Daly Podcast Pilot Project on Earwolf with Andy Daly.

Gourley co-hosted Pistol Shrimps Radio with his Superego colleague Mark McConville. The podcast consisted of unedited commentary of the games of The Pistol Shrimps, a women's rec league basketball team in Los Angeles.

In addition to hosting his own shows, Gourley has guested on numerous podcasts over the years, including Never Not Funny, Comedy Bang! Bang!, Thrilling Adventure Hour, and Spontaneanation. In addition to editing Superego, Gourley has also edited Judge John Hodgman and The Sound of Young America.

In 2018, he started hosting In Voorhees We Trust With Gourley and Rust with Paul Rust, a podcast series reviewing every Friday The 13th film in the franchise. The self-proclaimed "easy-listening cozy-cast," now simply titled With Gourley and Rust, has had several seasons analyzing and discussing horror films.

Gourley has served as a producer and co-host on Conan O'Brien's podcast Conan O'Brien Needs a Friend since it debuted in November 2018.

In January 2023, Gourley debuted the first episode of Mallwalkin' with co-host Mark McConville. Each episode the co-hosts walk a local mall and comment on retail offerings while recording impromptu interviews with business owners and avoiding audio recording policy violations.

Gourley is a singer, guitarist, and songwriter. He composed the theme for I Was There Too with James Bladon. He has released a solo album titled Garanimal Farm, recorded tracks with his band named Townland, and released an album with The Journeymen titled Mount Us More.

== Personal life ==
In 1997, Gourley won a contest to see who could best imitate the sound of a flushing toilet.

Gourley lives in Pasadena with his wife, Amanda Lund, with whom he has two daughters.

== Filmography ==
=== Television ===
Year	Title	Episode(s)	Role
1996	Kwik Witz		Himself
2003	Ultraforce	All	Kel
2003	Buckle Up!	TV Short	Mustang
2003	The Fastest Samurai in the West	TV series short	Bad Ass Cowboy
2003	Time Belt	"Oh. Shit. Zombies." "Can I Tell You a Story?" "Hitler!" "Got Any Micro-Transistors?"	Jesus Christ
2004	Time Belt	"Finally"	Soldier
2004	World Cup Comedy	1x10	Himself
2004–2005	Laser Fart	1x3, 1x6	Robot Dick
2006	Lingo	5x57	Himself
2012	Attack of the Show!	August 11, 2012	Himself
2012	Margot Rourke and the Boys Club	Short	Narrator
2012	The Incendiary Adventures of a Scientist Gone Mad!	Short	Replacement
2013–2015	Drunk History	1x01, 1x08, 3x04, 3x13	Narrator/Ian Fleming
2013	TakePart Live	1x70	Himself
2013	Ghost Ghirls	"School Spirit"	Ghost Dad
2013	Boardwalk Empire's Richard Harrow: Murderer for Hire	Video short	
2013	The Funtime Gang	TV movie	Det. Jeff Seabury
2014	Nerdterns	"Key of Awesome in the Lipton Book of World Records"	Julian P. Harumph
2015	Community	"Wedding Videography"	Briggs Hatton
2015	Comedy Bang! Bang!	"Randall Park Wears Brown Dress Shoes With Blue Socks"	Professor Ellis
2015	Comedy Bang! Bang!	"Robert Kirkman Wears a Tan Blazer and Red Suit Pants"	Martin Thomas Newton
2015, 2020	Talking Tom and Friends	2 episodes	Gilbert (voice)
2015	Adventure Time	"Orgalorg"	Ma Elder (voice)
2016	Another Period	"Harvard"	Albert Einstein
2016	HarmonQuest	"Earthscar Village"	Chadge
2017	Blindspot	"Borrow or Rob"	Thad Munson
2017	Better Things	"Blackout"	BBC News Announcer
2019	Bajillion Dollar Propertie$	"Royale Pains"	Chavdar
2019	HarmonQuest	"Goblopolis Lost"	Chadge
2020	Kidding	3 episodes	Bobby Belongo
2020	The George Lucas Talk Show	"Season VII: The Arli$$ Awaken$"	Himself
2021	Close Enough	"Men Rock!/Secret Horse"	Additional voices
2022	Birdgirl	"Fli on Your Own Supply"	Office worker (voice)
2026	Big City Greens	"The Farmies"	Male Mass Produce Rep (voice)

=== Film ===
Year	Title	Role
2018	You Are The Captain	Dante Elmers

=== Podcasts ===
Podcast	Episode	Date	Role
Superego	All	2006–present	Dr. Matt Gourley, PyT/Various
Comedy Bang! Bang!	#38	2010/01/29	Grandma Jonesy
Comedy Bang! Bang!	#289	2014/05/26	H.R. Giger
Comedy Bang! Bang!	#308	2014/09/01	Himself/H.R. Giger
Comedy Bang! Bang!	#326	2014/12/15	Ian Fleming
Comedy Bang! Bang!	#348	2015/04/27	Jim Chambers/Professor Stillwater
Comedy Bang! Bang!	#370	2015/08/17	Himself/Danielle Steel
Comedy Bang! Bang!	#382	2015/10/19	H.R. Giger
Comedy Bang! Bang!	#405	2016/03/03	Irvin Kershner
Comedy Bang! Bang!	#412	2016/04/04	Professor Stillwater
Comedy Bang! Bang!	#555	2018/07/16	Cal Buckley/Professor Stillwater
Comedy Bang! Bang!	#623	2019/10/14	Himself/Ted Kemper/Jed Kemper
Comedy Bang! Bang!	#663	2020/07/05	P.A.I.G.E.
Comedy Bang! Bang!	#702	2021/4/18	H.R. Giger
Comedy Bang! Bang!	#746	2022/2/27	P.A.I.G.E.
Comedy Bang! Bang!	#787	2022/12/4	Teen Giger
The Wolf Den	#15	2011/05/15	Himself
The Wolf Den	#66	2014/11/05	Himself
Pop My Culture	#52	2011/09/01	Himself (with Superego)
The Apple Sisters	#17–18	2011/09/26–10/03	
This American Wife	Extrasode 1	2012/08/20	Advice columnist
Thrilling Adventure Hour	Various	2012–2015	Various
The Dead Authors Podcast	Chapter 5	2012/01/17	Carl Sagan
The Dead Authors Podcast	Chapter 19	2012/12/24	Authors of the Gospel (John)
The Dead Authors Podcast	Chapter 13	2012/12/31	Brothers Grimm
The Dead Authors Podcast	Chapter 38	2014/10/09	Ian Fleming
The Dead Authors Podcast	Chapter 47	2015/06/23	Carl Sagan
The Dead Authors Podcast	Addendum ii	2015/07/17	Christopher Marlowe
The Dead Authors Podcast	Addendum iii	2014/07/24	Aleister Crowley
Walking the Room	#125	2012/10/16	Himself (with Superego)
The Andy Daly Podcast Pilot Project	All	2013–2018	Co-host/various
James Bonding	All	2013–present	Co-host
Quit It	Star Charting	2013/03/13	Himself
Earwolf Presents	#25	2013/12/16	Himself
I Was There Too	All	2014–2018	Host
Hollywood Handbook	#38	2014/06/24	Himself
The Nerdist Podcast	#548	2014/07/18	Himself
Never Not Funny	15J	2014/10/12	Himself
Never Not Funny	16I	2014/04/12	Himself
Who Charted?	#210	2014/12/10	Himself
How Did This Get Made?	#99	2014/12/12	Himself (crossover with James Bonding)
How Did This Get Made?	#126	2015/12/25	Himself
The Canon	#19	2015/03/23	Himself
Spontaneanation	#1, #10, #15, #16, #22, #27, #28, #34, #37, #58, #60, #62, #68, #86, #99.5 #107, #125, #137, #145, #146, #155, #165.5, #171, #175, #183	2015–2018	Improviser
Black List Table Reads	#301–304	2015/06/11–2015/07/02	
Get Up On This	#200	2015/07/14	Himself
Welcome to Vinci		2015/07/26	Himself
Pistol Shrimps Radio	All	2015–2020	Co-host
Superego: Forgotten Classics	All	2015	Cast member
Hello from the Magic Tavern	100C	2017	Chamblin Bunnycuddle
With Special Guest Lauren Lapkus	#88	2016/07/22	Dennis Palp
With Special Guest Lauren Lapkus	#121	2017/06/30	Mother
With Gourley and Rust	All	2018–present	Co-host
Conan O'Brien Needs a Friend	All	2018–present	Producer and Co-host
Bonanas for Bonanza	All	2020–present	Mutt Taylor
Keys to the Kingdom	All	2023	Co-host and Co-creator

Other appearances:

- Star Wars Minute
- Comedy Film Nerds
- Earwolf Challenge
- Accept the Mystery
- Cracked
- Podcast: The Ride
- Jordan Jesse Go
- Feral Audio
- Before You Were Funny
- Succotash
- Feliz Navipod
- The Biggest Mistake
- Film Junk
- Doug Loves Movies
- The Big Ones
- Newcomers
- How Did This Get Made?
- Harmontown
