= Fracas! Improv Festival =

The FRACAS! Improv Festival (commonly known as FRACAS!) is a multi-day annual improvisational theatre festival held at The University of Southern California in Los Angeles, California. The festival is hosted by Second Nature Improv, USC’s premiere long-form improv troupe. In addition to performances, the festival hosts celebrity guests, panels, and Q&As with professional improvisers currently working in television, film, and/or theatre, as well as improv workshops led by improv professionals. While the performances and panels are open to the public, workshops are available only to registered festival participants.

FRACAS! was not held in 2020–21 due to the COVID-19 pandemic.

== History – The first 5 years ==
FRACAS! I (2004)

The first Fracas! Improv Festival was held on April 16 and 17, 2004, about a year and a half after Second Nature was formed. Noting the lack of attention given to college-aged improvisers at larger national festivals, founder and director of Second Nature, Nick Dazé, started Fracas! as a way to connect with other collegiate improv troupes.

Eight troupes attended the inaugural festival. Each troupe was given a forty-minute performance slot, with four troupes performing each night. At the end of each performance, the audience voted on a favorite member of each troupe and those performers played in an “All Star Show” which closed the festival on Saturday night. The festival was held adjacent to USC’s campus at the Village Gate Theatre, which only sat 75 people at maximum capacity.

FRACAS! II (2005)

The second annual festival took place April 15 and 16, 2005, also at the Village Gate Theatre. Ten troupes performed at the festival including Occam’s Razor from The University of Chicago. Of the remaining nine troupes, four were from the University of Southern California. Unlike the previous year’s festival, troupes at Fracas! II were given only 30 minute performance slots in order to accommodate the larger number of participating groups. Five troupes performed each evening, culminating in the “All Star Show” which ended the festival on Saturday night.

FRACAS! III (2006)

The third annual Fracas! occurred on April 21 and 22, 2006, and was attended by six troupes. Because so few troupes participated, each was given a 45-minute time slot. As in past years, the favorite performers from each team played together in an “All Star Show” which ended the festival. New to the festival this year was the addition of workshops run by improvisers including James Thomas Bailey and Andrew Daly.

FRACAS! IV (2007)

The festival’s fourth annual Fracas! in 2007 was larger than before. 15 college troupes participated from nearly a dozen colleges nationwide. Additionally, with the Village Gate Theatre now too small a venue, Fracas! was moved to USC’s Ground Zero Performance Cafe, which could fit double the audience of the Village Gate. The festival was expanded to three nights, and took place on April 12–14, 2007. The 2007 festival was attended by more than 1000 people, and had more than 150 registered participants. Fracas! IV consisted of 5 performances each evening, with each troupe performing for 40 minutes. In place of the “All Star Show” an open improv jam was held at the end of each night of performances. Any audience members, including members from all troupes, were permitted to perform. For the first time in the festival’s history, no admission was charged to audience members, with the bulk of the festival’s cost being covered by donations.

Nearly a dozen workshops were held over the course of the three-day festival, allowing participants to study with performers from The Upright Citizen’s Brigade Theatre, iO West, The Groundlings, and ComedySportz. Additionally, Fracas! IV saw the addition of discussion panels held with improvisers who were currently working in television, film, and/or theatre. Panel members included Angela Kinsey and Melora Hardin from The Office, Frank Caeti and Keegan-Michael Key of MADtv and The Second City, and Michael Bunin of My Boys.

The Onion was the headlining sponsor of the 2007 Fracas! Improv Festival, with additional support from campus radio station KSCR as well as USC’s Undergraduate Student Government.

FRACAS! V (2008)

The fifth annual Fracas! Improv Festival hosted 18 troupes, expanding to include three more schools. Additionally, Fracas! became an international festival for the first time, hosting a troupe from the United Kingdom. The opening night of the festival was moved from the Village Gate Theatre to USC’s McCarthy Quad, another first. Fracas! V took place on April 17–19, 2008. Each night offered 6 hours of free improv, showcasing 6 troupes per night and concluding with an improv jam open to the public.

The amount of participating troupes led to more professional workshops, offering students 14 different workshops with a dozen professional improvisers from The Upright Citizen’s Brigade Theatre, iO West, The Groundlings, and ComedySportz. The festival also added a fourth discussion panel. The discussion panels offered an hour of conversation with panelists including Ed Helms from The Office, Stephnie Weir from MADtv, Saturday Night Live’s Jerry Minor and Todd Stashwick of The Riches.

In 2007, FRACAS! incorporated discussion panels as a new way for professional improvisers to share their knowledge of and appreciation for the art of improvisation with the newest generation of improvisers. While the discussion panels were aimed at college improvisers, they were open to the general public at no charge. The festival planners intended for the panels to provide a starting point for the young improvisers that attended Fracas! to begin considering how the art of improv can continue after college.

Though it was the first time discussion panels were held, a number of high-profile improvisers volunteered their time to be panel members, including cast members from The Office, MADtv, and each of the major improv training centers in Los Angeles. A member of Second Nature Improv moderated each panel.

=== 2008 Discussion Panels ===
The following discussion panels took place at the 5th Annual Fracas! Improv Festival.

==== Women in Improv ====
The Women in Improv discussion panel featured a discussion on the experience of being a female improviser in a predominantly male environment. The following panelists appeared:

- Heather Anne Campbell (Boom Chicago, ImprovOlympic, The Upright Citizens Brigade Theatre)
- Natasha Leggero (Reno 911!, Joe Schmo 2)
- Jessica Makinson (Halfway Home, Trigger Happy TV, ImprovOlympic)
- Danielle Schneider (Best Week Ever, The Upright Citizens Brigade Theatre)
- Stephnie Weir “(MADtv, ImprovOlympic, The Second City)”

==== Forming and Sustaining a Cohesive Group ====
The Forming and Sustaining a Cohesive Group discussion panel featured a discussion with members of the legendary improv troupe The Swarm as well as members of the up-and-coming troupe Convoy. The following panelists appeared:

- Alex Berg “(Convoy, The Upright Citizens Brigade Theatre)”
- Todd Fasen “(Convoy, The Upright Citizens Brigade Theatre)”
- Alex Fernie “(Convoy, The Upright Citizens Brigade Theatre)”
- Sean Conroy “(The Swarm, ASSSSCAT, Crossballs, The Upright Citizens Brigade Theatre)”
- Billy Merritt “(The Swarm, Uncorked with Billy Merritt, The Upright Citizens Brigade Theatre)”

==== Improv in the Entertainment Industry ====
The Improv in the Entertainment Industry panel involved a discussion of how improvisation is used within the entertainment industry, including improvisation in non-comedic acting, and whether or not improv comedy can work on television. The following panelists appeared:

- Tim Bagley “(Monk, Will and Grace)”
- Brian Huskey “(VH1’s Free Radio, Late Night with Conan O’Brien, Superbad)”
- Jerry Minor “(Saturday Night Live, Mr. Show, Carpoolers)”
- Todd Stashwick “(The Riches, Burn Manhattan, Hothouse Improv)”
- Nicole Randall Johnson “(MADtv, The 40-Year-Old Virgin)”

==== Creating an Original Improvised Show ====
The Creating an Original Improvised Show panel will discuss the process of creating an original show that relies heavily upon improvisation. The following panelists are scheduled to appear:

- Chad Carter “(The UCB’s MySpace Show, Creature Comforts, Human Giant)”
- Ed Helms “(The UCB’s Seth and Ed’s Puppet Talk Show, The Daily Show, The Office)”
- Seth Morris “(The UCB’s Seth and Ed’s Puppet Talk Show, Curb Your Enthusiasm, The Marijuanalogues)”

=== 2007 Discussion Panels ===
==== Improv and Sketch Comedy ====
The Improv and Sketch Comedy discussion panel featured a discussion of both Improv and Sketch Comedy, as well as how the two forms of comedy influence each other. Panelists were:

- Frank Caeti (MADtv, The Second City)
- Heather Anne Campbell (Boom Chicago, The Groundlings)
- Sean Conroy (Late Night with Conan O’Brien, The Upright Citizens Brigade Theatre)
- Megan Kellie (The Great Sketch Experiment, Karla)
- Keegan-Michael Key (MADtv, The Second City).

==== Improv in the Entertainment Industry ====
The Improv in the Entertainment Industry panel involved a discussion of how improvisation is used within the entertainment industry, including improvisation in non-comedic acting, and whether or not improv comedy can work on television. Panelists were:

- Jordan Black (The Groundlings, Halfway Home, For Your Consideration)
- Michael Bunin (My Boys, ImprovOlympic)
- Andrew Friedman (The Groundlings, It's Always Sunny in Philadelphia)
- Melora Hardin (The Office)
- Angela Kinsey (The Office, ImprovOlympic).

==== Short Form and Long Form ====
The Short Form and Long Form panel compared the two main types of improvisational theatre. The panelists discussed the supposed rivalry between the two forms, and the benefits to each. Panelists were:

- James Thomas Bailey (artistic director of ComedySportz)
- Eric Hunicutt (training director, iO West)
- Seth Morris (artistic director of The Upright Citizens Brigade Theatre, Los Angeles)
- Brian Palermo (The Groundlings).

== Recent years ==
In 2024, FRACAS! XX was graced by the Crazy Uncle Joe Show, one of The Groundlings main stage shows, for the first time. Among the cast of this performance were David Magidoff, Tru Valentino, and Stephanie Courtney, known best for her character Flo from Progressive. Additionally, Taran Killam attended as the festival’s celebrity spotlight, interviewed by troupe member Liam Stephenson.

In 2025, FRACAS! XXI had the honor of hosting the Crazy Uncle Joe Show once again. This cast included Roy Jenkins, Derek Jeremiah Reid, and Lee Newton. In addition, Wayne Brady attended as the celebrity spotlight guest, interviewed by troupe member Alannah Fredericks. Following the interview, Brady opened it up to audience questions, wherein he elaborated on his experience both as an actor/broadway performer and as an improv legend.

== Participating troupes/colleges ==
=== Fracas! XXI (2025) ===
- Barren Mind Improv, Arizona State University
- Charles Darwin Experience, University of Arizona
- Comedy Joust, University of California, Santa Cruz
- Comedy Wars, University of Missouri
- Commedus Interuptus, University of Southern California
- FOOSH, University of California, San Diego
- Humor Force Five, University of California, Santa Cruz
- Jericho!, University of California, Berkeley
- Ludus Remedium, University of Southern California
- Merry Men, University of Southern California
- NAUghty Bits, Northern Arizona University
- Slippery When Wet, University of California, San Diego
- Spoiler Alert, University of Southern California

== Sponsors ==
The 2007 Fracas! IV Improv Festival was sponsored by The Onion. Additional local sponsors were USC’s Undergraduate Student Government, KSCR Radio. The 2008 Fracas! Improv Festival retained sponsorship by The Onion, and KSCR, and added additional sponsorship from Glacéau, the makers of Smart Water and Vitamin Water.

In recent years, FRACAS! has been largely a self-funded endeavor, with the troupe participating in fundraising techniques (like year-long dare bingo) in order to raise their funds. In 2025, FRACAS! XXI was fortunate enough to be sponsored once again by The Onion.

== See also ==
- List of improvisational theater festivals
