= M.I.'s Westside Comedy Theater =

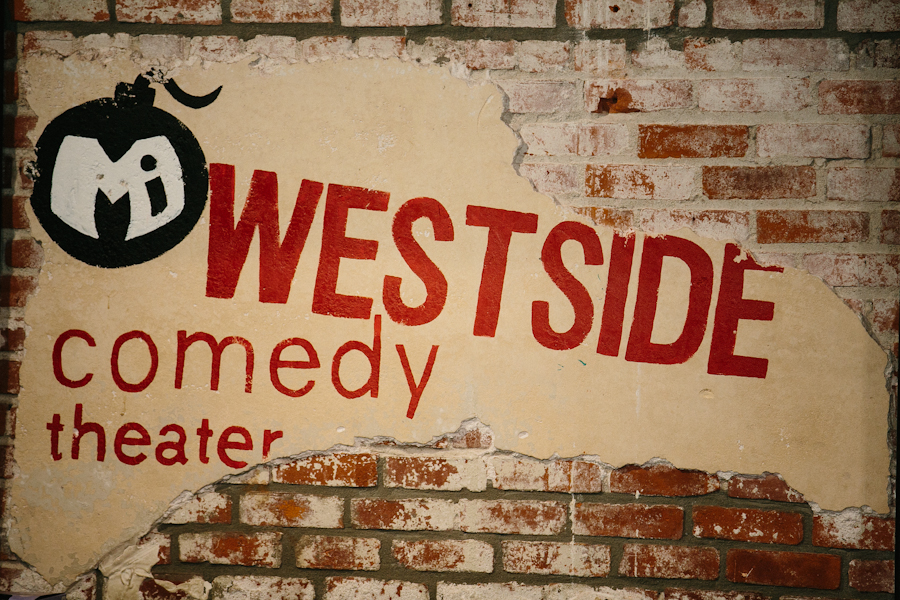
- Address: 1323-A 3rd St, Santa Monica, California; United States
- Type: Comedy club, bar
- Events: Sketch comedy, improvisation, stand-up comedy

Construction
- Opened: 2009

Website
- westsidecomedy.com

M.I.'s Westside Comedy Theater (Formerly Westside Eclectic) is a comedy club, theater, bar, and comedy training center located in Santa Monica, California.

== Company history ==
In 1998, six improvisers from the improv group Mission IMPROVable at UMASS Amherst moved to Chicago, Illinois to train and perform.

By the year 2000, the group began touring their short form comedy show and in 2001 they performed at NACA (National Association for Campus Activities). They began performing shows at colleges all across the country. Soon thereafter, the group grew, hiring more improvisers so that they could perform more widely, travelling in their van nicknamed "Vanarky".

In 2002 the first handful of M.I. performers came out to Los Angeles, California to develop a sketch pilot for MTV, but were not picked up in favor of Human Giant. However, they continued to be permanent fixtures on many of LA's most popular comedy stages.

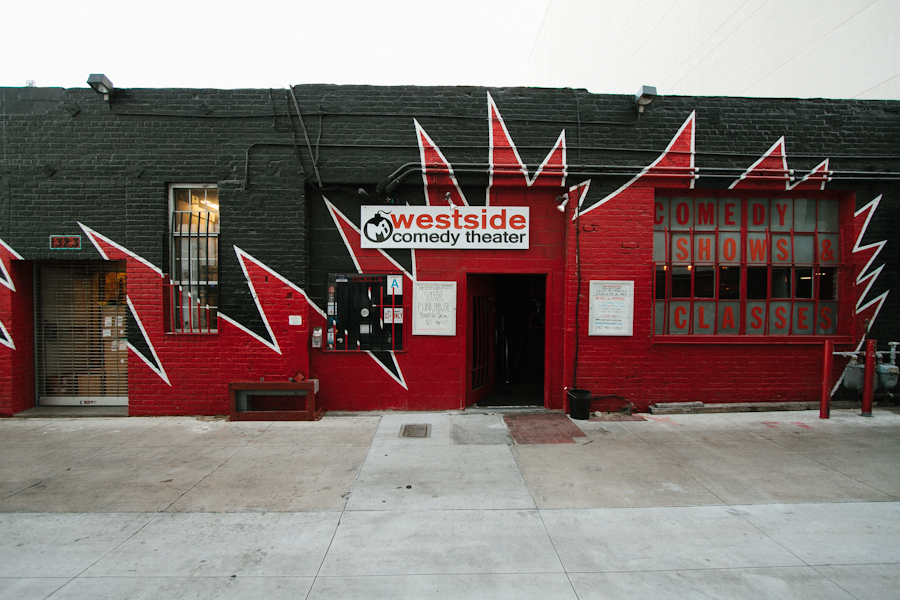
M.I.'s Westside Theater Entrance in Santa Monica, California

The theater was opened on April 1, 2009, by former members of Mission IMPROVable, including Lloyd Ahlquist, co-creator of the YouTube series Epic Rap Battles of History At the time of the theater's founding, Ahlquist served as general manager and artistic director. Co-founder Sean Casey (owner The Glendale Room & The Lyric Hyperion Theater & Cafe) took over for Ahlquist in 2011, where he managed the theater's expansion and renovation, expanding programming to 7 nights a week. The current General Manager is Chris Gorbos.

== Notable past and present performers ==
Many comedians have performed at the theater, including; Cole Stratton, Alonzo Bodden, David Alan Grier, Tig Notaro, Kevin Pollak, Neal Brennan, Demetri Martin, Aziz Ansari, Bill Burr, Zach Galifianakis, Russell Peters and Dave Chappelle.

Currently, Mission IMPROVable has over 50 members and performs over 350 shows a year from Hawaii to Singapore. M.I. Productions is also involved in projects for film, TV and created an alcohol awareness show A Shot of Reality for colleges and military bases across the country.

The founders appear together onstage at the theatre weekly in The Grind, a longform improv show for 10 years before retiring the show in 2019.

== Theater information ==
The training center runs seven levels of courses in improvisational theatre and two levels of courses in stand-up comedy.
