= CSZ =

CSZ may refer to:

- An abbreviation for "city, state, and ZIP code" in the United States.
- ComedySportz, an improvisational comedy show
- CSZ is the ICAO airline designator for Shenzhen Airlines
- Cascadia subduction zone
