= Jeremy Carter =

American actor

- Born: February 22, 1972 (age 53); Kansas City, Missouri
- Occupation(s): Actor, comedian
- Years active: 2006–present

Jeremy Carter (born February 22, 1972) is an American actor and comedian best known for his work on the Superego podcast.

== Career ==
Carter began in the Kansas City improv scene, starting with ComedySportz in 1992. Carter is a founding member of Der Monkenpickel, which is an improv group out of Lawrence, Kansas that also featured Jason Sudeikis. Carter has also performed with iO West and D.U.H.

Carter met Matt Gourley at a ComedySportz tournament in San Jose in the mid-90s. He spent time as an actor and improviser at various Disney theme parks. Gourley and Carter were founding contributors to Channel 101, producing and starring in the "retro futuristic action spectacular" Ultraforce. Ultraforce lasted three episodes and also featured Derek Mears, Jeff B. Davis, and Chris Tallman.

=== Music ===
The Journeymen, made up of Carter, Gourley, Mark McConville, and James Bladon, released an album titled Mount Us More in 2013. Carter released a follow-up EP titled "Bad Honky" as his Superego persona Shunt McGuppin on June 16, 2015. Bad Honky, on which Paul F. Tompkins and Erinn Hayes also appear, was produced by Dan Franklin.

=== Podcasts ===
In 2006, Gourley and Carter launched Superego, an improvisational podcast they conceived of on Christmas Eve 2005 based on the conceit of clinical case studies. Superego has since added Mark McConville, Paul F. Tompkins, & James Bladen as regular cast members.

Carter has appeared on numerous other podcasts, including the Thrilling Adventure Hour and The Dead Authors Podcast.

== Personal life ==
Carter is from Kansas City.

Prior to starting Superego, Gourley and Jeremy Carter had a job flying between Los Angeles and San Francisco to accrue frequent flyer points. Carter lives in Long Beach, California.

== Filmography ==
=== Television ===
| Year | Title | Episode(s) | Role |
|---|---|---|---|
| 2003 | Ultraforce | All | Trask |
| 2003 | Buckle Up! | TV Short | Earl Bucket |
| 2003 | The Fastest Samurai in the West | TV series short | The Master |
| 2003 | Time Belt | "Hitler!" | Adolf Hitler |
| 2003 | Second Time Around | All | Principal Withers |
| 2003 | Computerman | Computerman Auditions | Himself |
| 2004 | The Harper Teen Mystery Files | All | Sheriff Carlton Harper |
| 2004-2005 | Who's Teaching Whom? | S01E02; S01E04 | Kip Williams |
| 2007 | Videogame Theater | Various | Various |
| 2013 | The Funtime Gang | TV movie | Det. Ace Johansen |
| 2013 | TakePart Live | 1x70 | Himself |

=== Podcasts ===
| Podcast | Episode | Date | Role |
|---|---|---|---|
| Superego | All | 2006–present | Dr. Jeremy Carter, PhD/Various |
| Comedy Bang! Bang! | #38 | 2010/01/29 | |
| Comedy Bang! Bang! | #308 | 2014/09/01 | Himself |
| The Apple Sisters | #17-18 | 2011/09/26-10/03 | |
| Pop My Culture | #52 | 2011/09/01 | Himself (with Superego) |
| This American Wife | Extrasode 1 | 2012/08/20 | Advice columnist |
| Thrilling Adventure Hour | Various | 2012-2015 | Various |
| The Dead Authors Podcast | Chapter 13 | 2012/12/31 | Brothers Grimm |
| The Dead Authors Podcast | Chapter 21 | 2013/10/15 | Joseph Campbell |
| The Nerdist Podcast | #548 | 2014/07/18 | Himself |
| The Andy Daly Podcast Pilot Project | #1 | 2014/02/06 | |
| The Andy Daly Podcast Pilot Project | #3 | 2014/02/20 | |
| The Andy Daly Podcast Pilot Project | #8 | 2014/03/27 | |
| The Andy Daly Podcast Pilot Project | #9 | 2018/03/07 | |
| The Andy Daly Podcast Pilot Project | #13 | 2018/04/03 | |
| The Andy Daly Podcast Pilot Project | #15 | 2018/04/18 | |
| The Andy Daly Podcast Pilot Project | #16 | 2018/04/25 | |
| Superego: Forgotten Classics | All | 2015 | Cast member |
| Spontaneanation with Paul F. Tompkins | #30 | 2015/10/19 | Himself (improviser) |
| Spontaneanation with Paul F. Tompkins | #34 | 2015/11/16 | Himself (improviser) |
| Spontaneanation with Paul F. Tompkins | #89 | 2016/12/05 | Himself (improviser) |
| Spontaneanation with Paul F. Tompkins | #97 | 2017/01/30 | Himself (improviser) |
| Spontaneanation with Paul F. Tompkins | #107 | 2017/04/10 | Himself (improviser) |
| Spontaneanation with Paul F. Tompkins | #126 | 2017/08/21 | Himself (improviser) |
