= Pop My Culture =

Comedy podcast

Pop My Culture was a podcast hosted by comedic actors and improvisers Cole Stratton and Vanessa Ragland. Broadcast approximately weekly, it is an informal, conversational show about movies, television, music, gossip, etc. with the two hosts and their celebrity guests. The show was named the #2 Best Comedy Podcast of the Moment by Rolling Stone, one of the Top 20 Comedy Podcasts of 2013 by Paste Magazine, and one of 10 Favorite Comedy Podcasts by IFC.com. and Mashable.com. The show launched March 2, 2010 with inaugural guest Samm Levine, and joined the Nerdist Network of shows in December 2011. They have done live recordings at SF Sketchfest, The Rooftop Comedy Festival in Aspen, Co., the LA Podfest, the 2015 Wondercon in Anaheim, CA, and the 2016 Wondercon in Los Angeles, CA.

The Podcast concluded in January 2017, with their 213th and final episode, recorded live at SF Sketchfest with guests Paul F. Tompkins, Samm Levine and Rhett Miller.

Cole Stratton and Vanessa Ragland, Pop My Culture Podcast

== Episode list ==
=== 2010 ===
| Episode | Guest/Episode Title | Release date |
|---|---|---|
| 1 | Samm Levine | March 2, 2010 |
| 2 | Janet Varney | March 16, 2010 |
| 3 | Deanna Russo | March 26, 2010 |
| 4 | Bobby Campo | April 7, 2010 |
| 5 | Chris Hardwick | April 21, 2010 |
| 6 | Mather Zickel | April 30, 2010 |
| 7 | Keith Coogan | May 13, 2010 |
| 8 | Paul F. Tompkins | May 20, 2010 |
| 9 | Linda Cardellini | May 31, 2010 |
| 10 | Mo Collins | June 10, 2010 |
| 11 | Oscar Nunez and Danny Pudi (Live from the Rooftop Comedy Festival in Aspen, Colorado) | June 15, 2010 |
| 12 | Cristine Rose | June 22, 2010 |
| 13 | Matthew Lillard | July 1, 2010 |
| 14 | Simon Helberg | July 8, 2010 |
| 15 | Michael J. Nelson, Kevin Murphy and Bill Corbett | July 16, 2010 |
| 16 | Michael Hitchcock | July 21, 2010 |
| 17 | Rob Delaney | July 30, 2010 |
| 18 | Laraine Newman | August 5, 2010 |
| 19 | Frank Conniff | August 21, 2010 |
| 20 | Joe Lo Truglio | August 27, 2010 |
| 21 | Tony Hale | September 9, 2010 |
| 22 | Doug Jones | September 16, 2010 |
| 23 | Graham Elwood | September 23, 2010 |
| 24 | The Sklar Brothers | October 5, 2010 |
| 25 | Savage Steve Holland and Curtis Armstrong | October 13, 2010 |
| 26 | Andy Kindler | October 26, 2010 |
| 27 | Alan Ruck | November 4, 2010 |
| 28 | Joshua Malina | November 14, 2010 |
| 29 | Paul Scheer | November 28, 2010 |
| 30 | Jimmy Pardo | December 15, 2010 |

=== 2011 ===
| Episode | Guest/Episode Title | Release date |
|---|---|---|
| 31 | Pop My Cork: The Year in Review with Simon Helberg, Samm Levine, Danny Pudi, Deanna Russo, and Janet Varney | January 9, 2011 |
| 32 | Bob Odenkirk (Live at SF Sketchfest) | January 22, 2011 |
| 33 | Bobcat Goldthwait | February 9, 2011 |
| 34 | Steve Agee | February 25, 2011 |
| 35 | Eddie Deezen | March 6, 2011 |
| 36 | The Long Shot Podcast (Eddie Pepitone, Sean Conroy, Jamie Flam and Amber Kenny) | March 14, 2011 |
| 37 | The Thrilling Adventure Hour (Ben Acker, Ben Blacker, Marc Evan Jackson, Colin Hanks and James Urbaniak) | March 22, 2011 |
| 38 | Freaks and Geeks (Samm Levine, Sarah Hagan, Natasha Melnick and Steve Bannos) (Live at the Improv Comedy Lab in Hollywood) | April 1, 2011 |
| 39 | Casey Wilson | April 10, 2011 |
| 40 | Brice Beckham | April 22, 2011 |
| 41 | Thomas Lennon | April 29, 2011 |
| 42 | Garfunkel and Oates | May 10, 2011 |
| 43 | Paul F. Tompkins | May 23, 2011 |
| 44 | J. Elvis Weinstein | May 30, 2011 |
| 45 | Mindy Sterling | June 14, 2011 |
| 46 | Kevin Pollak | June 22, 2011 |
| 47 | Rob Paulsen | July 7, 2011 |
| 48 | William Zabka | July 14, 2011 |
| 49 | Dave Coulier | July 26, 2011 |
| 50 | Emma Caulfield | August 9, 2011 |
| 51 | Rider Strong | August 17, 2011 |
| 52 | Superego (Matt Gourley, Jeremy Carter and Mark McConville) | September 1, 2011 |
| 53 | Nigel Dick | September 9, 2011 |
| 54 | Julia Duffy | September 20, 2011 |
| 55 | Matt Berry and Rich Fulcher | October 3, 2011 |
| 56 | Jonathan Silverman | October 11, 2011 |
| 57 | Tom Lenk and Adam Busch | October 20, 2011 |
| 58 | Fred Dekker | October 31, 2011 |
| 59 | Meredith Salenger | November 10, 2011 |
| 60 | Dave Anthony and Greg Behrendt | November 20, 2011 |
| 61 | Ethan Suplee | November 30, 2011 |
| 62 | Phil LaMarr | December 9, 2011 |

=== 2012 ===
| Episode | Guest/Episode Title | Release date |
|---|---|---|
| 63 | Jim Rash | January 3, 2012 |
| 64 | Pop My Cork Part 1: The Best of 2011 with Tony Hale, Rob Paulsen, Meredith Salenger, Paul F. Tompkins and James Urbaniak | January 11, 2012 |
| 65 | Pop My Cork Part 2: The Worst of 2011 with Tony Hale, Rob Paulsen, Meredith Salenger, Paul F. Tompkins and James Urbaniak | January 18, 2012 |
| 66 | John Lehr | January 26, 2012 |
| 67 | Drew Carey (Live at SF Sketchfest) | February 3, 2012 |
| 68 | Dave Holmes | February 13, 2012 |
| 69 | Pop My Oscars! with Myq Kaplan and Samm Levine | February 22, 2012 |
| 70 | Timothy Omundson | February 29, 2012 |
| 71 | Fred Stoller | March 9, 2012 |
| 72 | Judy Greer | March 16, 2012 |
| 73 | John Hodgman, Aimee Mann, and John Roderick | March 26, 2012 |
| 74 | Amber Tamblyn | March 30, 2012 |
| 75 | Felicia Day | April 5, 2012 |
| 76 | Jane Espenson | April 13, 2012 |
| 77 | Daniel O'Brien and Soren Bowie | April 20, 2012 |
| 78 | Damien Fahey | May 1, 2012 |
| 79 | Jenny Mollen | May 11, 2012 |
| 80 | Ken Marino | May 20, 2012 |
| 81 | Mary Lynn Rajskub | June 1, 2012 |
| 82 | Joe Dante | June 11, 2012 |
| 83 | Elizabeth Laime | June 19, 2012 |
| 84 | Jake Fogelnest | July 1, 2012 |
| 85 | Kathleen Rose Perkins | July 10, 2012 |
| 86 | Doug Jones | July 25, 2012 |
| 87 | Barry Bostwick and Diani & Devine | August 3, 2012 |
| 88 | Ian Edwards | August 12, 2012 |
| 89 | Lake Bell | August 21, 2012 |
| 90 | Jesse Thorn | August 30, 2012 |
| 91 | Iain Morris | September 6, 2012 |
| 92 | Arden Myrin, April Richardson and Guy Branum | September 19, 2012 |
| 93 | Legends of Voice Acting with Rob Paulsen, Maurice LaMarche, Tara Strong, Cree Summer and Phil LaMarr (Live at RIOTLA Comedy Festival) | September 28, 2012 |
| 94 | Brooklyn Brothers (Ryan O'Nan and Michael Weston) | October 7, 2012 |
| 95 | Jim O'Heir | October 15, 2012 |
| 96 | Layla Kayleigh | October 24, 2012 |
| 97 | Matt Walsh | November 1, 2012 |
| 98 | Retta and Meredith Salenger | November 9, 2012 |
| 99 | Deborah Ann Woll and E.J. Scott | November 19, 2012 |
| 100 | "Weird Al" Yankovic | November 26, 2012 |
| 101 | Dan Harmon and Erin McGathy | December 6, 2012 |
| 102 | Jane Espenson and Brad Bell | December 19, 2012 |

=== 2013 ===
| Episode | Guest/Episode Title | Release date |
|---|---|---|
| 103 | Pop My Cork Part 1: The Best of 2012 with Dave Holmes, Laraine Newman, Timothy Omundson, Fred Stoller and Rider Strong | January 7, 2013 |
| 104 | Pop My Cork Part 2: The Worst of 2012 with Dave Holmes, Laraine Newman, Timothy Omundson, Fred Stoller and Rider Strong | January 11, 2013 |
| 105 | Stephen Tobolowsky | January 21, 2013 |
| 106 | Rachel Dratch (Live From SF Sketchfest) | February 11, 2013 |
| 107 | Erinn Hayes | March 5, 2013 |
| 108 | David Wain | March 14, 2013 |
| 109 | Carla Gallo | March 21, 2013 |
| 110 | Lamorne Morris | April 1, 2013 |
| 111 | Ari Shaffir | April 12, 2013 |
| 112 | Brent Weinbach | April 25, 2013 |
| 113 | Ian Brennan | May 8, 2013 |
| 114 | Jodie Sweetin | May 16, 2013 |
| 115 | Arye Gross | May 28, 2013 |
| 116 | Dana Gould | June 3, 2013 |
| 117 | Will McRobb and Chris Viscardi | June 11, 2013 |
| 118 | Missi Pyle | June 26, 2013 |
| 119 | Mike Lawrence | July 4, 2013 |
| 120 | Timm Sharp | July 16, 2013 |
| 121 | Mel Harris | July 26, 2013 |
| 122 | Paul F. Tompkins | August 5, 2013 |
| 123 | Melissa Claire Egan | August 16, 2013 |
| 124 | Luke Edwards | August 23, 2013 |
| 125 | Jason Antoon and Tricia O'Kelley | September 3, 2013 |
| 126 | Robyn Lively | September 16, 2013 |
| 127 | Molly Quinn | September 25, 2013 |
| 128 | Chris Gore | October 3, 2013 |
| 129 | Stars of TGIF with Reginald VelJohnson, Jodie Sweetin, Stuart Pankin and Brice Beckham (Live at LAPodfest) | October 14, 2013 |
| 130 | Armin Shimerman | October 22, 2013 |
| 131 | Doug Benson | November 4, 2013 |
| 132 | Paul and Storm | November 12, 2013 |
| 133 | Danny Tamberelli | November 20, 2013 |
| 134 | Kevin Heffernan | December 6, 2013 |
| 135 | David Nadelberg | December 18, 2013 |

=== 2014 ===
| Episode | Guest/Episode Title | Release date |
|---|---|---|
| 136 | Pop My Cork Part 1: The Best of 2013 with Dana Gould, Jim O'Heir, Kevin Pollak and Jodie Sweetin | January 12, 2014 |
| 137 | Pop My Cork Part 2: The Worst of 2013 with Dana Gould, Jim O'Heir, Kevin Pollak and Jodie Sweetin | January 16, 2014 |
| 138 | Josh Gondelman | January 28, 2014 |
| 139 | Christine Lakin | February 7, 2014 |
| 140 | Omar J. Dorsey | February 18, 2014 |
| 141 | Dana Snyder | February 28, 2014 |
| 142 | Julie Brown | March 10, 2014 |
| 143 | Sarah Burns | March 24, 2014 |
| 144 | Andy Daly | April 3, 2014 |
| 145 | Haley Joel Osment | April 14, 2014 |
| 146 | Stephen Root | April 24, 2014 |
| 147 | John Michael Higgins | May 10, 2014 |
| 148 | Mackenzie Astin | May 19, 2014 |
| 149 | Bruce McCulloch | May 25, 2014 |
| 150 | Patton Oswalt | June 2, 2014 |
| 151 | John DiMaggio | June 13, 2014 |
| 152 | Erin Gibson and Bryan Safi | June 26, 2014 |
| 153 | Katie Findlay | July 16, 2014 |
| 154 | Lauren Lapkus and Chris Alvarado | July 30, 2014 |
| 155 | Skeet Ulrich and Amelia Jackson-Gray | August 12, 2014 |
| 156 | Sam Richardson | August 20, 2014 |
| 157 | Romy Rosemont and Mary Birdsong | September 1, 2014 |
| 158 | Jay Chandrasekhar | September 10, 2014 |
| 159 | Cary Elwes | September 18, 2014 |
| 160 | Michael Showalter | September 29, 2014 |
| 161 | Legends of Voice Acting with Dee Bradley Baker, Richard Horvitz, Maurice LaMarche, Laraine Newman and Janet Varney (Live at LAPodfest) | October 8, 2014 |
| 162 | Patrick Fischler | October 16, 2014 |
| 163 | Pamela Adlon | October 27, 2014 |
| 164 | Mindy Cohn | November 5, 2014 |
| 165 | Michael Ironside | November 18, 2014 |
| 166 | Ed Crasnick | December 2, 2014 |

=== 2015 ===
| Episode | Guest/Episode Title | Release date |
|---|---|---|
| 167 | Pop My Cork Part 1: The Best of 2014 with Sarah Burns, Michael Hitchcock, Missi Pyle and Stephen Tobolowsky | January 11, 2015 |
| 168 | Pop My Cork Part 2: The Worst of 2014 with Sarah Burns, Michael Hitchcock, Missi Pyle and Stephen Tobolowsky | January 16, 2015 |
| 169 | James Adomian, Ron Funches and Ryan Lambert (Live from SF Sketchfest) | January 29, 2015 |
| 170 | Leonard Maltin and Baron Vaughn | February 19, 2015 |
| 171 | Scott Adsit | March 3, 2015 |
| 172 | Todd Glass | March 12, 2015 |
| 173 | Daniel Franzese | March 19, 2015 |
| 174 | Phil Hendrie | March 29, 2015 |
| 175 | Jessica Chobot and Whitney Moore (Live from Wondercon) | April 8, 2015 |
| 176 | Brian Palermo | April 23, 2015 |
| 177 | Agnes Bruckner | May 3, 2015 |
| 178 | Paul Adelstein | May 14, 2015 |
| 179 | Laura Dreyfuss | May 25, 2015 |
| 180 | Harland Williams | June 4, 2015 |
| 181 | Ilene Graff | June 14, 2015 |
| 182 | Josh McDermitt | June 24, 2015 |
| 183 | Diane Franklin and Amanda Wyss | July 6, 2015 |
| 184 | Dan Van Kirk and "Mark Wahlberg" | July 16, 2015 |
| 185 | Ginger Gonzaga | July 29, 2015 |
| 186 | Jess Harnell | August 9, 2015 |
| 187 | Wayne Federman and Jaime Fox | August 24, 2015 |
| 188 | Paul Brittain | September 11, 2015 |
| 189 | Matt Kirshen | September 24, 2015 |
| 190 | Dee Wallace | October 7, 2015 |
| 191 | Lori Alan | October 15, 2015 |
| 192 | Scott Aukerman | October 28, 2015 |
| 193 | Matt Mira | November 17, 2015 |
| 194 | Rob Huebel | November 29, 2015 |
| 195 | Sarah Baker | December 16, 2015 |

=== 2016 ===
| Episode | Guest/Episode Title | Release date |
|---|---|---|
| 196 | Pop My Cork Part 1: The Best of 2015 with Pamela Adlon, Guy Branum, Wayne Federman and Janet Varney | January 7, 2016 |
| 197 | Pop My Cork Part 2: The Worst of 2015 with Pamela Adlon, Guy Branum, Wayne Federman and Janet Varney | January 10, 2016 |
| 198 | Fred Willard (Live from SF Sketchfest) | January 24, 2016 |
| 199 | Matt Braunger | February 13, 2016 |
| 200 | Maria Bamford | February 28, 2016 |
| 201 | Craig Cackowski | March 20, 2016 |
| 202 | Maurice LaMarche and Rob Paulsen (Live from Wondercon) | March 30, 2016 |
| 203 | Grey Griffin | April 17, 2016 |
| 204 | Rick Overton | May 12, 2016 |
| 205 | Quincy Jones | May 31, 2016 |
| 206 | Lyric Lewis | July 6, 2016 |
| 207 | Epic Lloyd (Lloyd Ahlquist) and Mary Doodles (Mary Gutfleisch) | August 3, 2016 |
| 208 | Andre Gower and Ryan Lambert | August 17, 2016 |
| 209 | Illeana Douglas | September 29, 2016 |
| 210 | Toby Huss | October 12, 2016 |
| 211 | Brian Huskey | November 6, 2016 |
| 212 | Kirsten Vangsness | December 7, 2016 |

=== 2017 ===
| Episode | Guest/Episode Title | Release date |
|---|---|---|
| 213 | The Final Episode with Paul F. Tompkins, Samm Levine and Rhett Miller (Live from SF Sketchfest) | January 18, 2017 |
