= The Speakeasy (San Francisco) =

- Original language: English
- Written by: Bennett Fisher & Nick A. Olivero
- Music by: Nick Perez, Max Schroeder, and Joseph Wilcockson
- Genre: Immersive theater, Environmental theater, Interactive theater, Promenade theater

Premiere
- Date: January 10, 2014
- Place: The Boxcar Theatre Studios, 125A Hyde Street, San Francisco
- Directed by: Michael French, Leah Gardner, Erin Gilley, and Nick A. Olivero
- https://thespeakeasysf.com/

The Speakeasy was an immersive theater production set in 1920s during prohibition in the United States.

The show took place inside a San Francisco speakeasy and followed the stories of the staff, performers, and guests. The audience was free to move about the environment (in what is often called promenade theater) and craft their own experience, which some critics referred to as “choose-your-own-adventure.” The script was up to 1,500 pages long.

The Speakeasy closed its run of regular shows on August 4^{th} 2019, citing financial difficulties due to having a staff of 120 people. At the time of closing, tickets cost between ticket cost $75 and $145.

The Palace Theater venue is still available to rent for private functions.

== History ==
The Speakeasy was originally conceived by Nick A. Olivero and was developed by Barry Eitel, Geoffrey Libby, and Olivero in 2013. It opened on January 10, 2014 in San Francisco's Tenderloin District at the Boxcar Theatre Studios. The Speakeasy ran for seventy-five performances over five months to sold out houses, directed by Peter Ruocco, Leah Gardner, and Nick A. Olivero. David Gluck was the General Manager. The production closed on June 16, 2014.

The play was remounted on December 10, 2016 in San Francisco's North Beach District. It was written by Bennett Fisher and Nick A. Olivero and directed by Michael French, Leah Gardner, Erin Gilley, and Olivero. The new production cost over $2 million and introduced a new funding model.

In January 2019, the Boxcar Theatre hosted the "SF Sketchfest at The Speakeasy", where they co-produced six immersive comedy shows.

It was also named among the "Best Places to Play 2017" by San Francisco magazine The Speakeasy was nominated for Theatre Bay Area awards in 2019. and "Best of the Bay" by 7x7 magazine.

== Characteristics ==
The show The Speakeasy: Age of Scofflaws was set in 1927. Up to 250 patrons were admitted and they were encouraged to dress in period-appropriate clothing. At the entrance, guests received an “electronic telegram” in the form of a text which included instructions to meet a “contact” at one of three locations. Once inside, guests received a set of “House Rules” which helped guide them throughout the night.

The Speakeasy had six main rooms to explore: The Bar, which served Prohibition-inspired cocktails; a Casino, where guests were allowed to play blackjack, craps, and roulette (for entertainment purposes only); a Cabaret, which had Vaudeville entertainment; Sal's Office, which had candlestick telephones and peepholes to observe through; a dressing room, which guests could watch the drama behind a one-way mirror; and a Parlor for more intimate theatrical scenes and improvised moments.

== Reception ==
The show has been subject to reviews from specialists in local and national media.

The Speakeasy: Age of Scofflaws was given a positive review by Dennis Harvey of 48 Hills, calling it "the kind of involving, employing, history-acknowledging and imagination-stirring event San Francisco needs, now more than ever." Harvey regarded the show's closing as "a real pity."
