= NBC Tower =

Office skyscraper in Chicago, Illinois

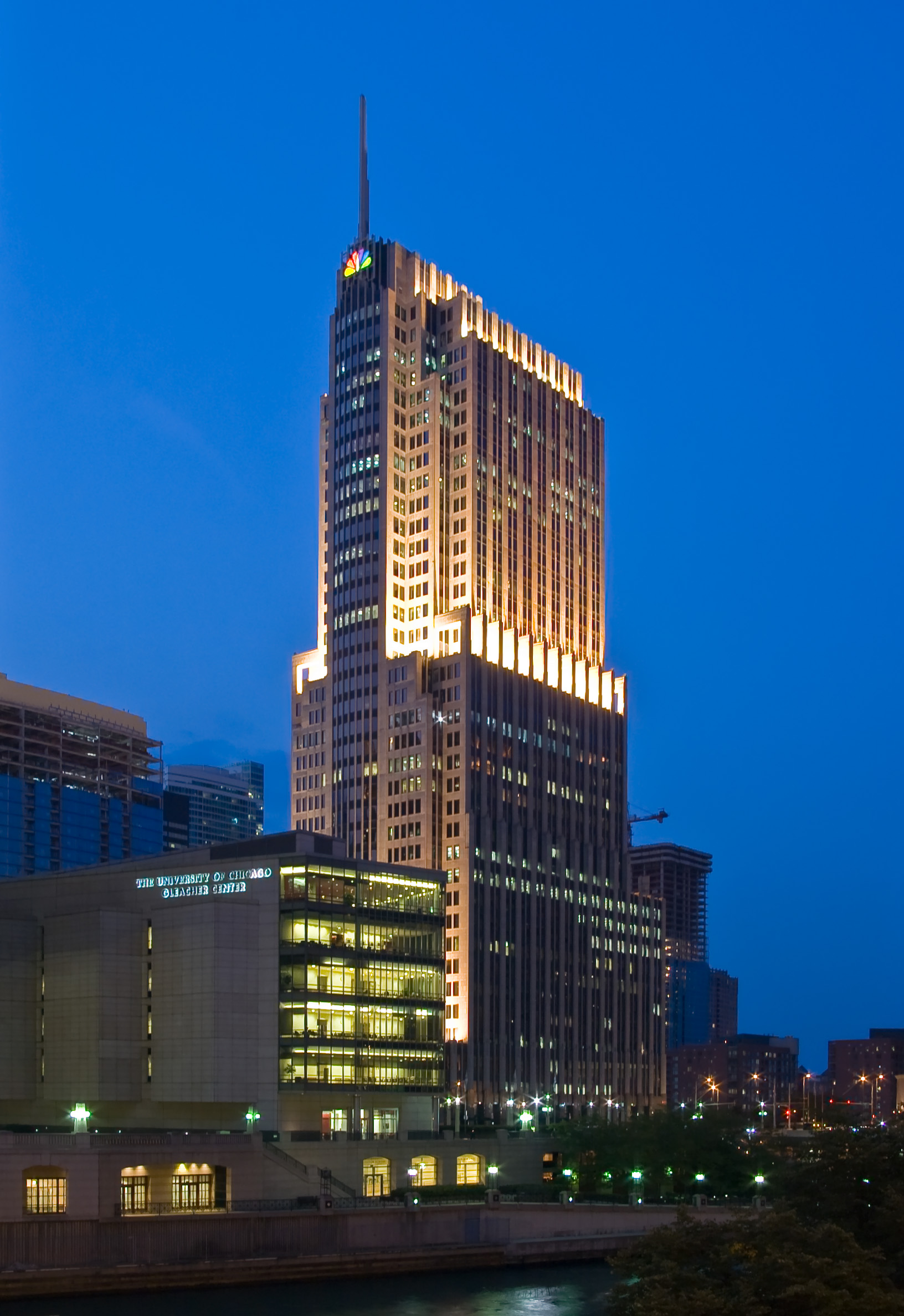
- NBC Tower with peacock logo

General information
- Type: Office
- Architectural style: Art Deco
- Location: Chicago, Illinois, U.S.
- Coordinates: 41.8899°N 87.6211°W
- Completed: 1989
- Owner: Metropolis Investment Holdings Inc.

Height
- Antenna spire: 627 ft (191 m)
- Roof: 497 ft (151 m)
- Top floor: 459 ft (140 m)

Technical details
- Floor count: 37

Design and construction
- Architect: Skidmore, Owings & Merrill

The NBC Tower is an office tower on the Near North Side of Chicago, Illinois located at 454 North Columbus Drive (455 North Cityfront Plaza is also used as a vanity address) in downtown Chicago's Magnificent Mile area. Completed in 1989, the 37-story building reaches a height of 627 feet (191 m). NBC's Chicago offices, studios, and owned-and-operated station WMAQ-TV are based in the building. At 10 o'clock on the evening of October 1, 1989, WMAQ-TV broadcast its first newscast from the new home, with the then-weeknight news team of Ron Magers, Carol Marin, John Coleman, and Mark Giangreco. Telemundo O&O WSNS-TV has also occupied the building since its purchase by NBC in 2001, and NBC's former radio properties, WKQX, and WLUP-FM, continue to maintain studios in the tower.

The design, by Adrian D. Smith of Skidmore, Owings & Merrill, is in the Art Deco style and bears a marked similarity to 30 Rockefeller Plaza in New York City, which is NBC's global headquarters. The tower is further enhanced by the use of limestone piers and recessed tinted glass with granite spandrels. The building takes additional cues from the nearby landmark Tribune Tower with the use of flying buttresses. A 130-foot (40 m) broadcast tower and spire tops the skyscraper. WMAQ and WSNS have STL and satellite facilities on the roof; the STLs link to WMAQ and WSNS's transmitter facilities atop the Willis Tower. WMAQ-AM (now WSCR) and STL were located in the building until 2006, when they relocated to Two Prudential Plaza.

Located in the Cityfront Plaza area, the building contains 850,000 sq ft (79,000 m^{2}) of space and three floors of underground parking with 261 spaces. Connected to the main tower is a four-story radio and television broadcasting facility where WSNS's newscasts and WMAQ's newscasts are currently taped, and was the former recording facility for Jerry Springer and The Steve Wilkos Show before their tax credit-influenced move to Stamford, Connecticut in 2009. It was also home to the 1990s syndicated improv/sketch show Kwik Witz, The Jenny Jones Show until its cancellation in 2003, Steve Harvey until its move to Los Angeles in 2017, and Judge Mathis until its cancellation in 2023.

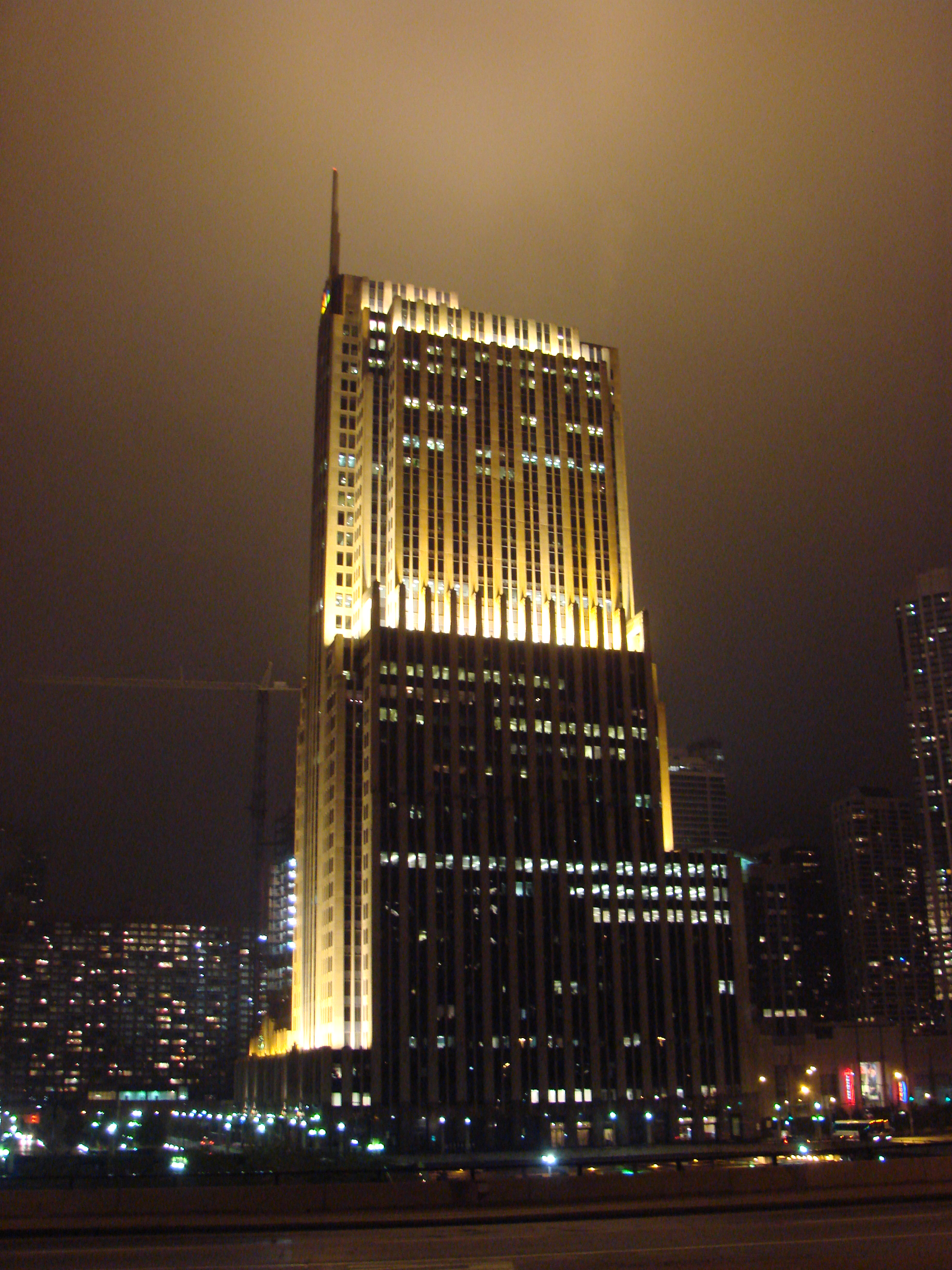
Looking north at night

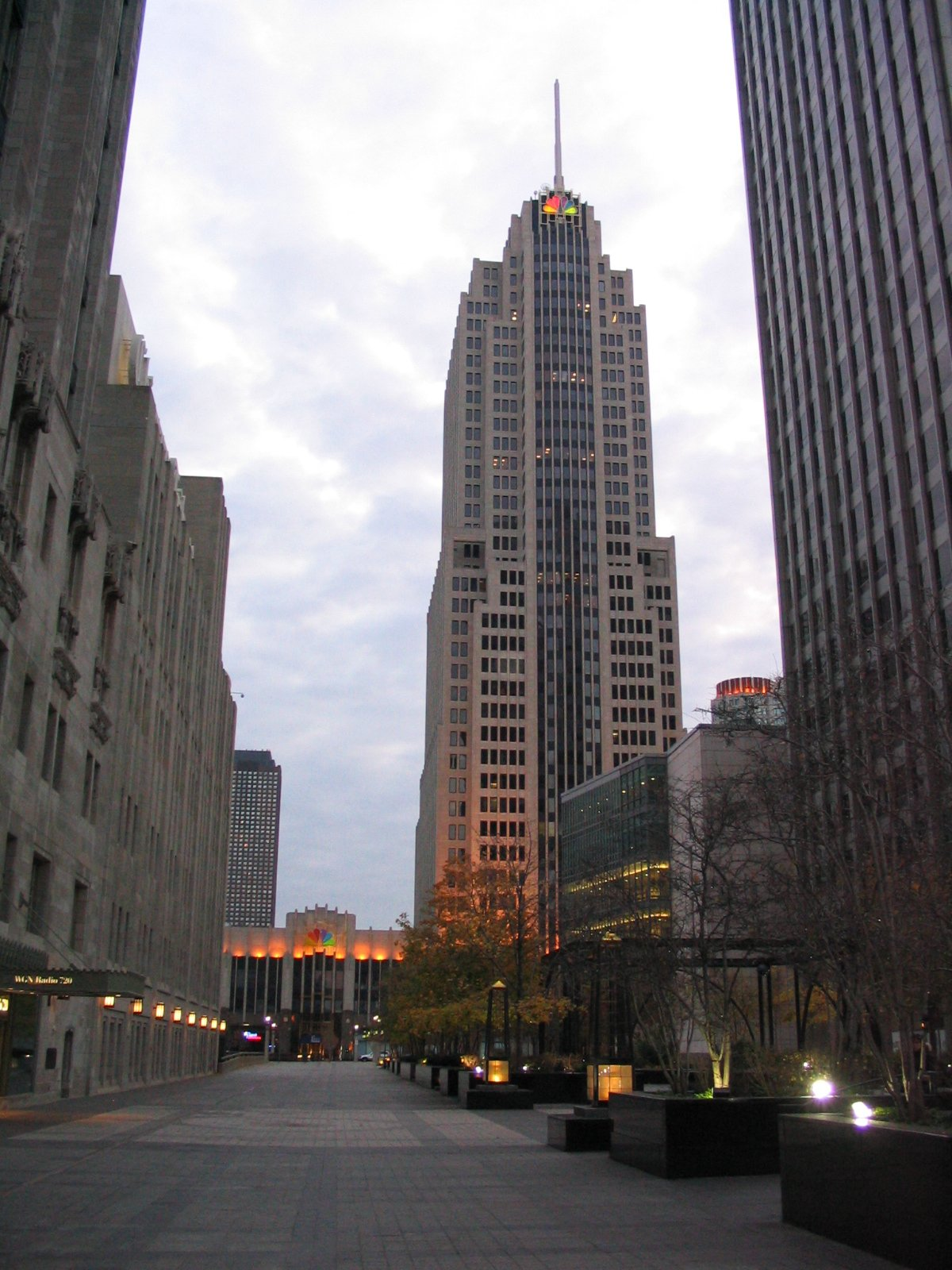
Looking east

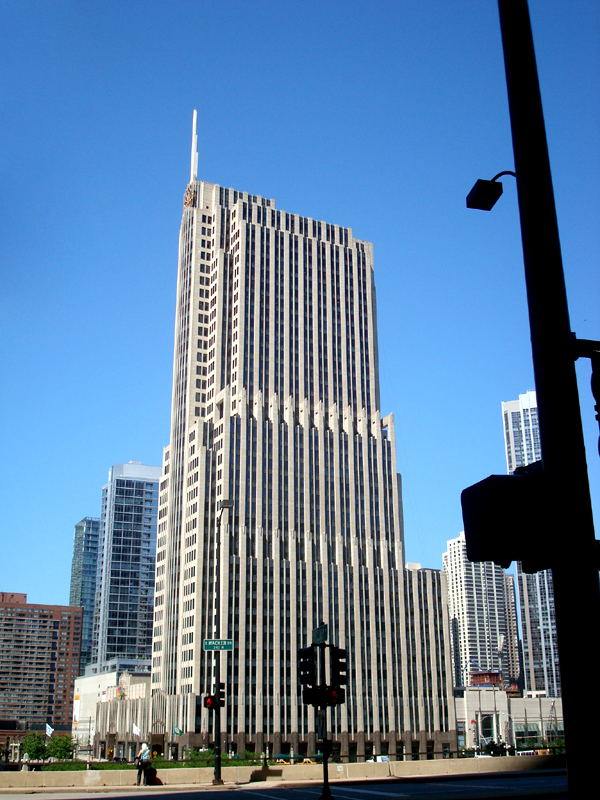
Looking north

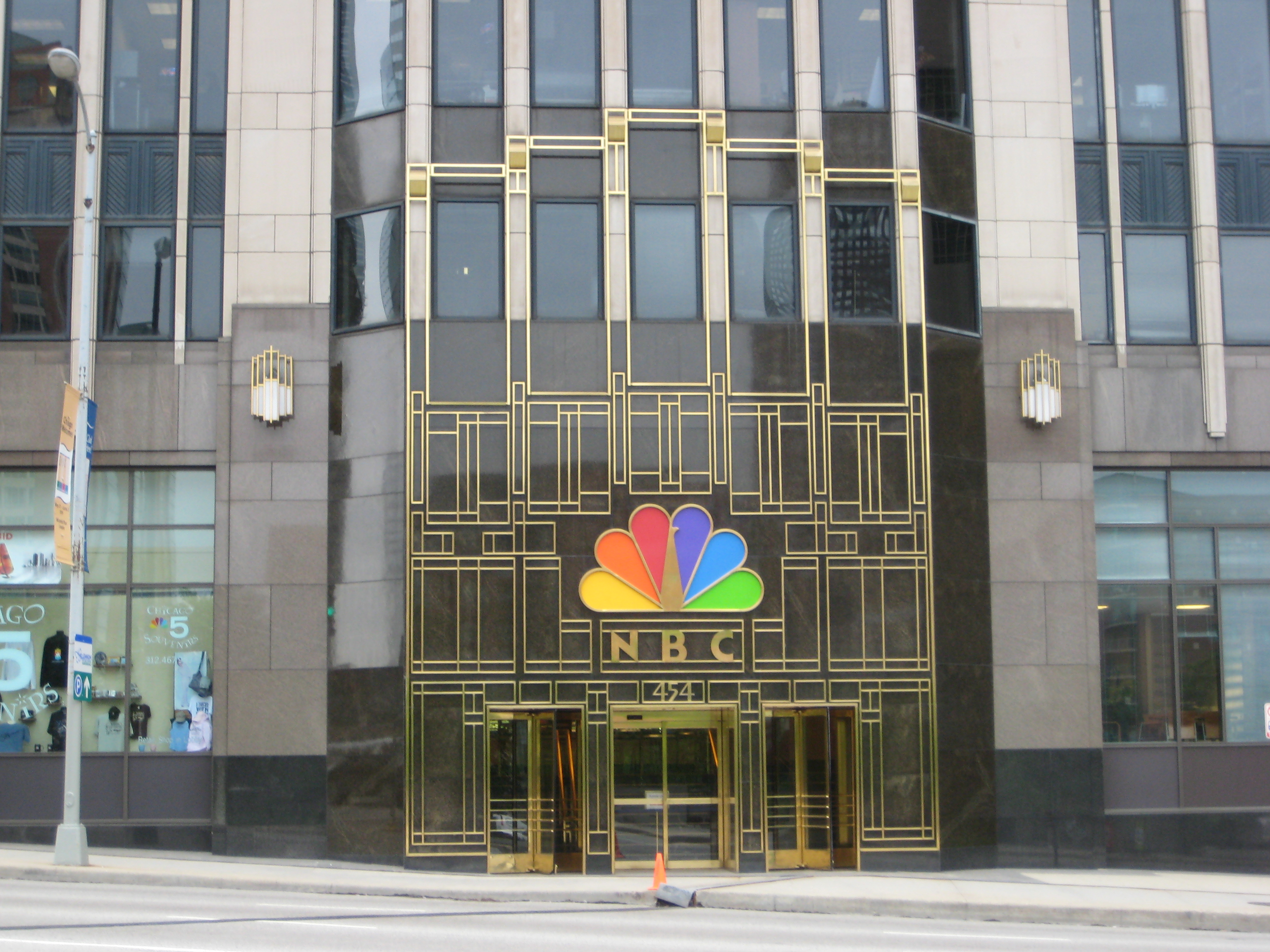
Columbus Drive entrance

== Tenants ==
=== TV and radio stations ===
The following TV and radio stations are located in the building:

- WMAQ-TV newscasts (1989–present)
- WSNS-TV (2002–present)
- WKQX (2016–present)
- WCKL (formerly WLUP-FM) (2016–present)
- WLS (2016–present)
- WLS-FM (2016–present)

In February 2016, alternative station WKQX and sister classic rock station WLUP-FM announced that they would be moving from their longtime home in the Merchandise Mart to a new studio in the tower. WKQX and WLUP-FM operated temporarily from the former WLS studios at 190 N. State St. On August 4, 2016, the move of WKQX and WLUP-FM to the tower was finalized.

=== Diplomatic missions ===
- The Consulate-General of India in Chicago is located in Suite 850.
- The Consulate-General of the Republic of Korea in Chicago is located in Suite 2700.
- The Consulate-General of Lithuania in Chicago is located in Suite 800.
- The Consulate-General of Turkey in Chicago is located in Suite 2900.

=== Other tenants ===
CBS Media Ventures' Chicago branch is located in Suite 2910.

The University of Chicago has classrooms, study spaces and a student lounge on the 28th floor of the NBC Tower for some of its graduate programs.

=== Former tenants ===
From the tower's opening to 2006, WMAQ/WSCR radio studios were also located in the building. The stations relocated.

The tower was also the world headquarters of Navistar International until 2000, when the company announced plans to relocate to west suburban Lisle, Illinois.

== Shows recorded ==
In addition to housing these entities, the studios have been home to the following shows:

- iVillage Live (2007)
- The Jenny Jones Show (1991–2003)
- Jerry Springer (1991–2009; originated and recorded here from 1992 to 2009)
- Judge Jeanine Pirro (2008–2011)
- Johnny B... On the Loose (1991)
- Judge Mathis (1999–2023)
- Kwik Witz (1996–1999)
- Merv Griffin's Crosswords (2007–2008, pilot shows only)
- Sports Action Team (2006–2007)
- The Steve Wilkos Show (2007–2009, moved to Connecticut in 2009)
- Steve Harvey (2012–2017)

== See also ==
- NBC Studios (New York City)
- List of skyscrapers
- List of tallest buildings in the United States
- List of tallest buildings in Chicago
- World's tallest structures
