= Superego (podcast) =

Improvised sketch comedy podcast

- Profiles In Self-Obsession
- Genre: Comedy, Improv
- Language: English

Cast and voices
- Hosted by: Jeremy Carter; Matt Gourley; Mark McConville; Paul F. Tompkins

Music
- Opening theme: "The Man with the Golden Gun" by John Barry

Production
- Production: Matt Gourley
- Length: 30-60 minutes

Technical specifications
- Audio format: Podcast (via streaming or downloadable M4A or MP3)

Publication
- No. of episodes: 79 episodes (as of March 4, 2016)
- Original release: March 1, 2006
- Updates: Monthly

Related
- Website: gosuperego.com

Superego is an improvised sketch comedy podcast by American comedians Jeremy Carter, Matt Gourley, Mark McConville, and Paul F. Tompkins.

== Concept ==
Superego is an improvised absurdist sketch comedy podcast presented as a collection of case studies prefaced by "doctors" as a primary example of a particular disorder. Nearly all the sketches are improvised in each recording session, typically with one or two characters at the center and the rest of the cast reacting to that set-up. The segments generally run 5–10 minutes unedited and Gourley edits them down to a 3-5 minute show length.

The podcast is presented in an enhanced format that allows listeners to pick a chapter and provides additional visual content.

== History ==
Superego was developed by Jeremy Carter and Matt Gourley, who met at a ComedySportz tournament in the mid-1990s and were founding contributors to Channel 101 where their show, Ultraforce, was a number one series. After finding the video production process to be a burden, they hit upon the idea of audio sketches as a less production-intensive medium. At a bar on the day after Christmas in 2005, Carter and Gourley came up with the idea of a "Godcast"; the idea then transformed into a clinic for personality disorders in order to grant more improvisational freedom.

The podcast debuted in 2006. Mark McConville joined the podcast in season 2 after having guested during the show's first season. Jeff Crocker joined and brought his skills as a video producer. Most of the podcast's music is produced by James Bladon.

On July 17, 2014 Superego announced the addition of Paul F. Tompkins as a member and the departure of Crocker.

Originally developed as an audio podcast, Superego has also occasionally released video 'Supershorts' that are animated and produced by Crocker. Superego's first live show, Superego Live!, was performed in Long Beach, California on December 10, 2008 and then again in Hollywood, California on March 11, 2009. The early live shows were in the style of a rehearsed sketch comedy revue. The group performed a live version of the show regularly at venues like San Francisco Sketchfest, the Kansas City Improv Festival, the Bell House, Theatre 99, and the Solid Sound Festival. The live performances now generally take the form of the group and its guests wearing lab coats and improvising with the aid of sound effects and music.

Season 4 began on September 1, 2014 after a 15-month hiatus.

On August 17, 2015 it was announced that Superego would be doing a show titled Superego: Forgotten Classics that would be part of the premium subscription to the new Earwolf Howl app. On March 2, 2016, Howl.fm posted the first three Superego seasons and extra material including commentary and live performances, with copyrighted music edited out and replaced by new tracks composed by James Bladon. The website stated that the enhanced episodes would be posted later.

Superego formally ended on March 4, 2016 with episode 4:6, though according to the group special episodes will continue to be released in the future. The group held a 10th Anniversary show on March 5, 2016 at Largo at the Coronet to celebrate the show's history and ending.

In July 2018, it was announced that Superego would return for a season 5.

In 2018 and 2019, two short, 4 episode seasons were released.

In 2026, for the podcast's 20th anniversary, a three episode seventh season and a live show have been produced.

=== The Journeymen ===
The Journeymen, made up of Carter, Gourley, McConville, and James Bladon released an album in July 2013 titled Mount Us More. The album consists primarily of country western/rock performed by the group's alter egos named Shunt McGuppin, Mutt Taylor, Cubby Lauderbourne, and Jimmy Blades. Carter and Gourley split the writing for the tracks.

Shunt McGuppin released a follow-up solo EP titled Bad Honky in June 2015. The album features guests including Erinn Hayes and Tompkins.

== Cast ==
=== Current members ===
- Dr. Jeremy Carter, PhD
- Dr. Matt Gourley, PyT
- Dr. Mark McConville, PhD
- Dr. Paul F. Tompkins, PhD

=== Former members ===
- Jeff Crocker, Resident Specialist Emeritus

=== Recurring guests ===
- James Bladon
- Chris Tallman

== Other podcast appearances ==
- In Season 3 Superego did a multi episode collaboration with the popular Thrilling Adventure Hour podcast titled "The War of Two Worlds."
- Comedy Bang! Bang!, episode #308
- The Nerdist Podcast, episode #548
- Walking the Room, episode #125
- The Discussion with Kevin Grigg
- Search for Treasure, episode #132
- Beginnings, episode 128
- Pop My Culture, episode #52
- This American Wife, episode #24

== Awards ==
- 1st Place - Viral Video Night, Improv Olympic West, November 2008
- The first double 5 star rating on Edgy Podcast Reviews
- Best First-Wave Podcast That's Better Than Ever, Splitsider, 2011
