= Kwik Witz =

- Genre: Improvisational comedy
- Written by: Jeff Rosenthal
- Directed by: Gary Shimokawa; Jim Stimpson
- Presented by: Andi Matheny (1995 pilot, 1996–97); Jillian Hamilton (1997–98); Robin Nance (1998–99)
- Country of origin: United States
- Original language: English
- No. of seasons: 3

Production
- Production locations: NBC Tower; Chicago, Illinois
- Production companies: Beau & Arrow Productions

Original release
- Network: Syndicated
- Release: 20 September 1996 – 1 September 1999

Kwik Witz is an American syndicated comedy program which aired in syndication, mainly on numerous NBC affiliate stations—usually in the time-slot following Saturday Night Live. The show originated from the NBC Tower studios of WMAQ-TV in Chicago, Illinois and was produced by Beau & Arrow Productions. The show shared studio space with The Jenny Jones Show, which was located immediately across from The Jerry Springer Show studio.

== Format ==
An improvisational comedy, it featured two teams of two performers competing against each other. The show had a live audience which voted to select the winner at the end of the sketch (usually four in a given program), with teams earning points based on the percentage of votes they got in each sketch. The winning team was given a prize brought by the losing team – a token gift usually of more comedic value than monetary.

Performers were scouted from various improvisational comedy and sketch comedy troupes. Comedians Wayne Brady—frequently teamed with Frank Maciel—and Ron West made appearances on Whose Line is it Anyway (West was an occasional performer on the British version; Brady later became a regular performer on the American version and appeared in a few episodes of the British show). Steve Carell appeared as a contestant on at least one episode with his partner Richard Laible, that being in March, 1997, along with Robert Covarrubias, Dan O'Connor, and John Rubano. One episode in April 1997 featured Judith Scott, Dave Razowsky, Jackie Hoffman, and Joe Liss. The May 3rd, 1997 show featured Wayne Brady, Dave Razowsky, Theresa Mulligan, and Clare Sera. During this time frame, the emcee was Andi Matheny. Matt Gourley was also on the show at least once, as he discussed on an episode of Conan O'Brien Needs a Friend. Second City improviser Richard Laible was a contestant several times and was also the audience warm-up emcee.

Although the games played on the show were familiar to fans of improvisational comedy, and the show's title and opening suggested that it was improvised, the performers in fact had advance knowledge of the challenges and had already rehearsed the sketches weeks in advance. (As the show's hosts explained at the beginning of each episode while laying out the rules, "we allow [the contestants] to cheat," although how much time the contestants were given to rehearse was never specified on air.)

The show launched with a limited-run pilot season in 1995, which was distributed by Hearst-Argyle Television (via their Milwaukee station, WISN-TV, which helped to coordinate the pilot tapings) and Beau & Arrow to stations throughout the Midwest during the test run. Nationally, the show debuted on September 20, 1996, and was canceled in the midst of its third season in 1999 (during which time the spelling of its title was altered to Quick Witz).
