= Second Nature Improv =

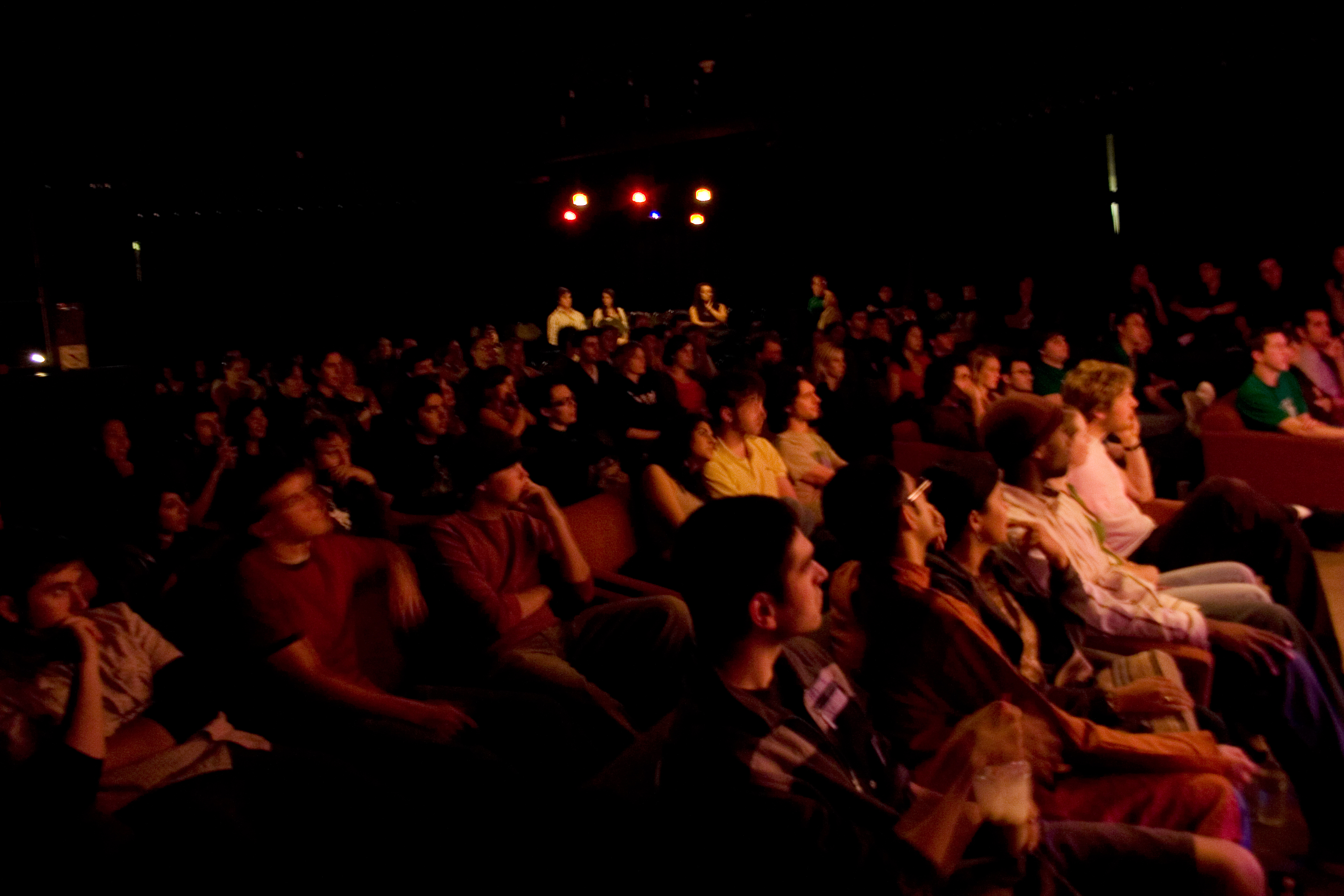
An audience at the Ground Zero Café, the former home for 2N’s performances.

Second Nature (also referred to as “2N”) is a long-form improvisational theatre troupe based in Los Angeles at the University of Southern California.

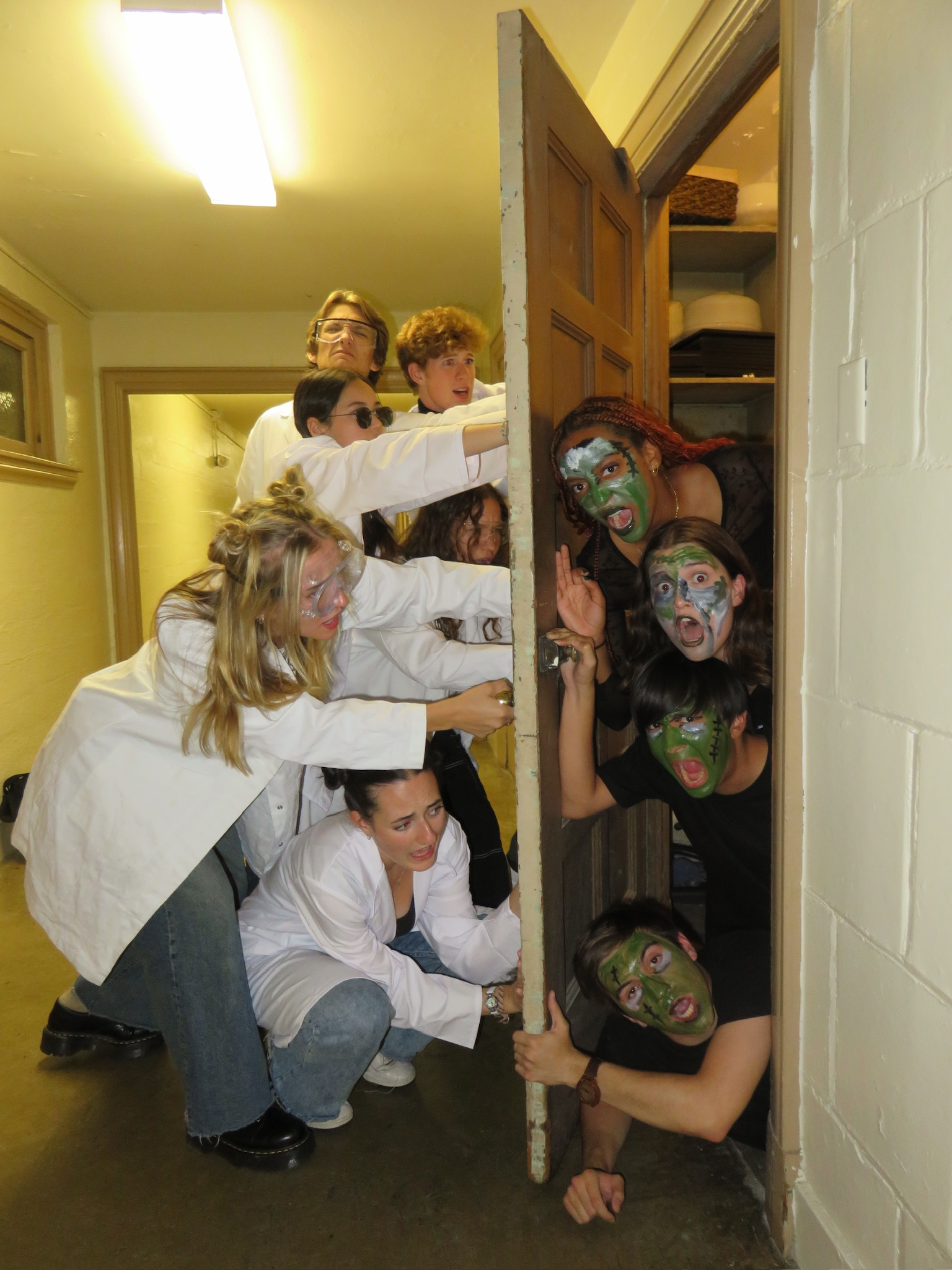
Second Nature in a newbs promo photoshoot, 2024.

Second Nature was founded on November 19, 2002. The troupe performs every Thursday night in USC’s PED Building, providing free, comedic, one-hour shows. The group regularly performs with other improv troupes from all over Los Angeles, including participation in UCB’s LA College Comedy Night. The collegiate troupe is known for the Fracas! Improv Festival, one of the largest intercollegiate improv comedy festivals in the world.

Second Nature began in pioneering The Facebook Show, an improvised comedy show based entirely on the Facebook profiles of audience volunteers in the 2000s. Today, they specialize in the Harold structure.

Second Nature has become a regular part of the college comedy sphere and of campus life at USC. The group has begun the careers of several comedians, actors, and directors.

== History ==
Second Nature was founded in 2002 by a group of USC students interested in performing improvised comedy. The troupe is an independent student-run organization within the University of Southern California. 2N chose their name based on the idea that performing spontaneous theatre should become “second nature” to the cast.

The style of Second Nature’s comedy has changed with time, as the students have become more passionate and knowledgeable about improvisational theatre. Originally, Second Nature performed ComedySportz style shows, with the troupe split into two competing factions. After being influenced by The Upright Citizens Brigade Theatre and The Groundlings with whom the troupe had taken workshops, Second Nature adopted a more free flowing scenic style of improvisation.

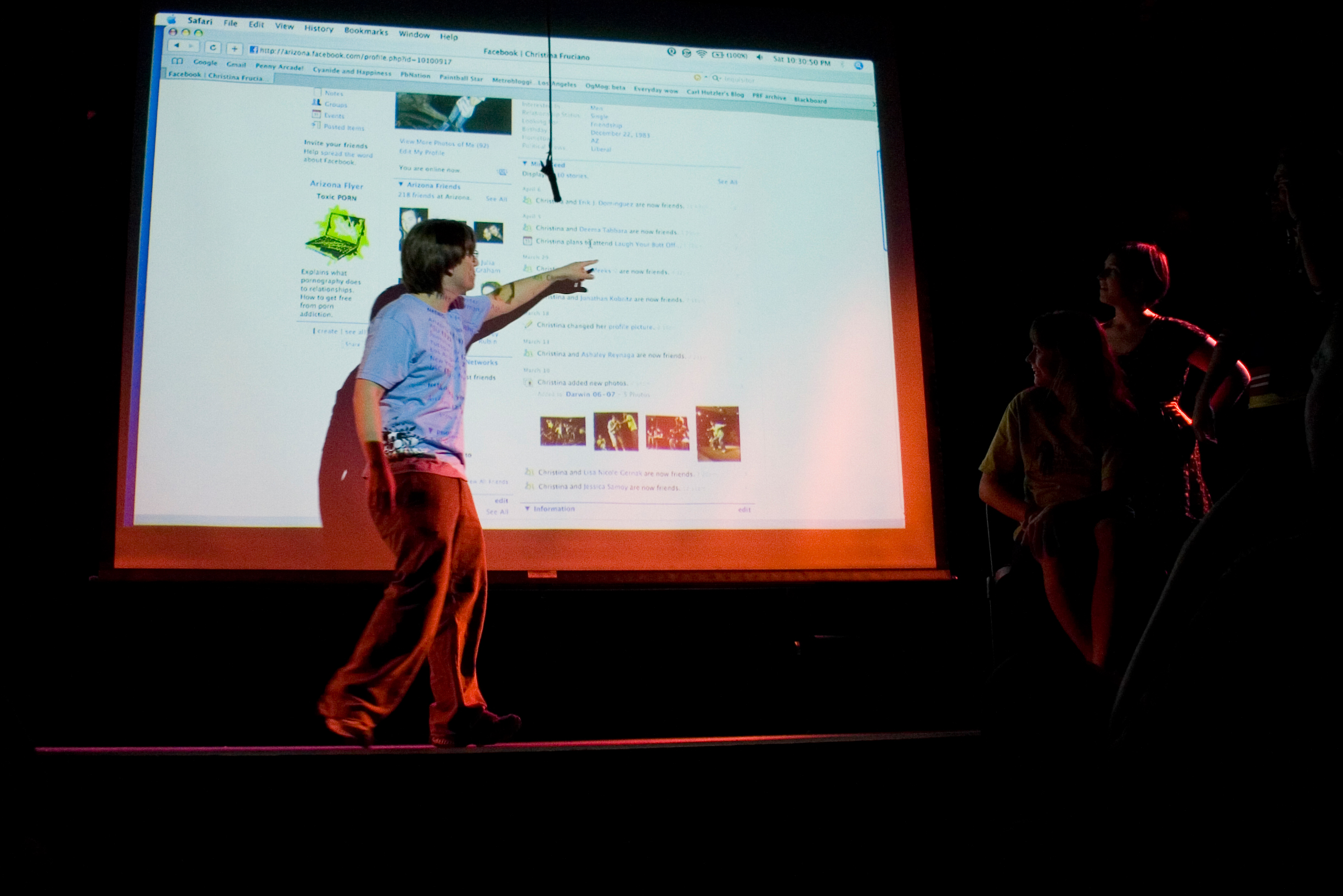
The Facebook Show, where Second Nature projected the Facebook profile of an audience volunteer.

Around its inception, Second Nature performed Special Format Shows which contained either a special show format, or a special guest. As many special format shows are experimental, few receive a strong enough audience reaction to be performed multiple times. A notable exception is The Facebook Show.

The Facebook Show consisted of three segments, roughly twenty minutes each. Each segment began with an audience member volunteering to be interviewed by Second Nature. During the interview, the audience member logged on to their Facebook profile, which was projected on a screen, and explored in front of the live audience. Finally, Second Nature used material from the volunteer’s Facebook profile as the basis for their improvisation.

2N’s first Facebook Show was performed in 2005, when Facebook was open only to college students. However, once the social networking website was opened up to the public, the show has become popular with a larger audience.

Part of the Armando – developed at ImprovOlympic – format that they once performed involves a guest monologist (frequently a celebrity) who uses a suggestion from the audience to inspire a truthful, personal monologue. The improvisers then use the monologue as inspiration for a series of scenes, which in turn inspire a response from the monologist.

Second Nature has performed The Armando with the following guest monologists:

- Dan Oster — MADtv
- Kate Flannery — The Office
- Paul Wolff — screenwriter, Family Ties, Little House on the Prairie, Home Improvement; executive story-editor, Remington Steele
- Tom Lennon — Reno 911!, The State
- Will Sasso — MADtv
- Midori — human sexuality writer, speaker, and sex educator
- Daniel Handler — aka Lemony Snicket, author of A Series of Unfortunate Events

At present, the troupe performs predominantly long-form improvisation, focusing on the Harold and Montage, while occasionally performing other forms, like The Bat. Once in 2024, 2N debuted an original form called “Speak No Evil”, wherein the audience voted on individual members of the cast to have a given obstacle, limiting their speech, hearing, or sight — emphasizing both their improvisational skills and appreciation for thinking outside of the box.

== The FRACAS! Improv Festival ==
The FRACAS! Improv Festival, or FRACAS!, is an improvisational theatre festival created and hosted by Second Nature, and held annually at the University of Southern California in Los Angeles since 2004.

In its first few years, FRACAS! grew into a national festival with more than a dozen participating universities, as well as workshops and panels with professionals from The Upright Citizens Brigade, The Groundlings, The Office, Mad TV, and ImprovOlympic.

FRACAS! had a dozen troupes at the festival in 2025. With celebrity interview appearances by Taran Killam and Wayne Brady as well as annual performances by the Crazy Uncle Joe Show (a Groundlings main stage show), 2N has cemented the event as a fixture of the USC comedic scene.

== Current cast ==
- Jordyn Abercrombie
- Dani Brown (President)
- Eli Buettner
- Brady Gluba
- Ayanna Ordonez
- Olive Petty
- DJ Placente
- Pablo Rodriguez
- Ashland Mullenix

== Notable alumni ==
- Shelby Fero — Emmy award-winning stand-up comedian and staff writer for Robot Chicken, @midnight, Idiotsitter
- Devin Field — UCB performer and staff writer for Jimmy Kimmel Live!, Workaholics, and Billy on the Street
- Dan Lippert — UCB performer and actor, Comedy Bang! Bang! regular
- Philip Labes — UCB performer, actor on Netflix’s GLOW and Funny or Die’s Tween Fest
- Angie Stroud — Frequent standup performer in The Belly Room at The Comedy Store in Los Angeles, and Netflix radio host, Named one of LA's Top 15 Comedians You Need To Know Right Now... by the LA Times
- Liam Stephenson — LA Comedian and Screenwriter, Instagram and Tiktok username @thirtycrabs

== See also ==
- Improvisational theatre
- List of improvisational theatre companies
- Upright Citizens Brigade Theatre
- The Groundlings
