= Cole Stratton =

American actor, comedian, producer (b. 1976)

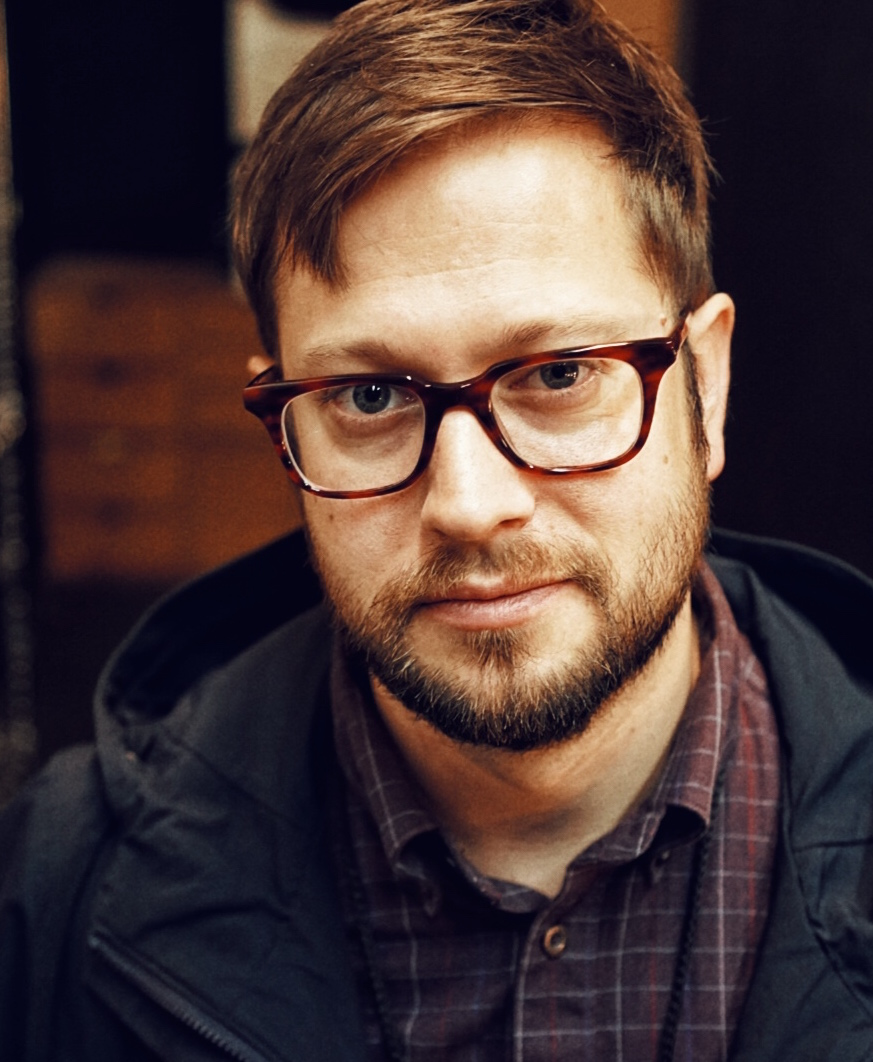
- Stratton in 2020
- Born: September 21, 1976 (age 50); Lansing, Michigan, U.S.
- Occupations: Actor, comedian, podcaster, writer, producer
- Years active: 2002–present
- Website: colestratton.com

Cole Stratton (born September 21, 1976) is an American actor, comedian, podcaster, writer and producer, best known as one of the Co-Founders of SF Sketchfest, the San Francisco Comedy Festival and the co-host of the Pop My Culture Podcast.

== Early life ==
Stratton was born in Lansing, Michigan and moved to Davis, California when he was 9 years old, where he attended Davis Senior High School. He graduated with a degree in Cinema from San Francisco State University. He moved to Los Angeles in 2003, where he currently resides.

== Career ==
=== SF Sketchfest ===
Stratton co-founded SF Sketchfest, the San Francisco Comedy Festival with David Owen and Janet Varney in 2002. One of the most prestigious festivals in the country, it showcases sketch, stand-up, improv, tributes, movies, cast reunions, musical and alternative comedy. Past performers include Carol Burnett, Conan O'Brien, The State, Gene Wilder, Garry Shandling, The Kids in the Hall, Mr. Show, Paul Reubens, Upright Citizens Brigade, Neil Patrick Harris and many more.

=== Pop My Culture Podcast ===
Stratton co-hosted the Pop My Culture Podcast alongside Vanessa Ragland. The podcast ranked second on Rolling Stone's Best Comedy Podcast of the Moment, one of the top 20 Comedy Podcasts of 2013 by Paste Magazine and one of 10 Favorite Comedy Podcasts by IFC and Mashable.com. After 6 years, the podcast wrapped up in January 2017 with their 213th and final episode with guests Paul F. Tompkins, Rhett Miller and Samm Levine. The episodes are available on iTunes, Nerdist and the podcast's website.

He's a frequent guest host and improviser on Kevin Pollak's podcast, Alchemy This, appearing on over 40 episodes. He also is a recurring guest on Chuck Bryant's Movie Crush Podcast, with episodes focused on Searching for Bobby Fischer, The Manchurian Candidate, Still Crazy and a special episode discussing his "100 Lesser-Known Movies to Watch at Home" list.

Other podcast guest appearances include Voyage to the Stars, Dumb People Town, Never Not Funny with Jimmy Pardo, Alison Rosen is Your New Best Friend, Comedy Film Nerds, Hello from the Magic Tavern, Jordan, Jesse, Go!, James Bonding, The JV Club, Totally Laime with Elizabeth Laime, Competitive Erotic Fan Fiction, The Wahlberg Solution, The Mutant Season, Talkin Walkin and Probably Science.

=== RiffTrax ===
Stratton has written and performed several comedic audio commentaries for films along with Janet Varney. These appear on the RiffTrax website under the "RiffTrax Presents" branding, as being officially sanctioned by RiffTrax founder and Mystery Science Theater 3000 alum, Michael J. Nelson.

RiffTrax commentaries featuring Stratton & Varney include Dirty Dancing, Ghost, Footloose, Poltergeist, The Lost Boys, Jaws 3-D, Flatliners and Dreamscape.

=== Television and film ===
Television appearances include: American Horror Story, Good Girls, 9-1-1, Nash Bridges, America's Most Wanted (featuring The Zodiac Killer), the Animal Planet original film The Retrievers, MTV's Yo Momma, and he was a cast member on NBC's competitive comedy pilot Comedy Colosseum. Film projects include: Diani & Devine Meet The Apocalypse, Callback opposite Kevin Farley, Around the Fire, Dead Man on Campus and The Selling.

=== Improv and sketch comedy ===
Stratton has studied improvisation at The Upright Citizens Brigade Theatre and M.I.'s Westside Comedy Theater, where he performs frequently with the groups Pretty, Pretty Pony and The Cobranauts. He tours with the improv group Theme Park (featuring Rachel Dratch, Oscar Nunez, Simon Helberg, Danny Pudi, John Michael Higgins, Michael Hitchcock, Ian Brennan, Janet Varney and Jessica Makinson). Theme Park has performed at SF Sketchfest, the Bridgetown Comedy Festival, Bentzen Ball, the Moontower Comedy Festival and the Rooftop Comedy Festival. He co-founded the Bay Area sketch collective Totally False People (who performed at the 2004 HBO U.S. Comedy Arts Festival in Aspen, Colorado). He's also performed with Greg Proops, Patton Oswalt, Jack McBrayer, Bob Odenkirk, Scott Adsit, Rick Overton, Matt Walsh, and Jeff Garlin.
