= Company of Angels =

American theatre company

Coordinates: 34.0603°N 118.2035°W

Company of Angels, now known simply as CoA, is an American theatre company, based in Los Angeles and founded in 1959.

The original company, incorporated by entertainment attorney Bertram Fields, included actors Richard Chamberlain, Leonard Nimoy, Vic Morrow and Vic Tayback. Company of Angels is the oldest not-for-profit repertory theater in Los Angeles. The company has received several Los Angeles theatrical awards, including the L.A. Drama Critics Circle Award, the Drama-Logue Award, the LA Weekly Theater Award, and the Ovation Award. The company has been sustained solely by its membership.

== Location ==
The first theatre of the Company of Angels was located on Vine Street and Waring Avenue in Hollywood (Los Angeles, California). On April 27, 1988, fire destroyed that building and in 1989, the company relocated to the Silver Lake area of Los Angeles, at 2106 Hyperion Avenue, today's Lyric Hyperion Theatre & Cafe. Seventeen years later, the Company left Silver Lake for the re-developing downtown Los Angeles area. After a brief stint at The Grand Avenue Club, Company of Angels is now based in the Hotel Alexandria at 501 S. Spring Street in Downtown Los Angeles above the Palm Court.
