= The Lyric Hyperion Theatre & Cafe =

Venue in Silverlake, Los Angeles

Coordinates: 34.098861°N 118.273666°W

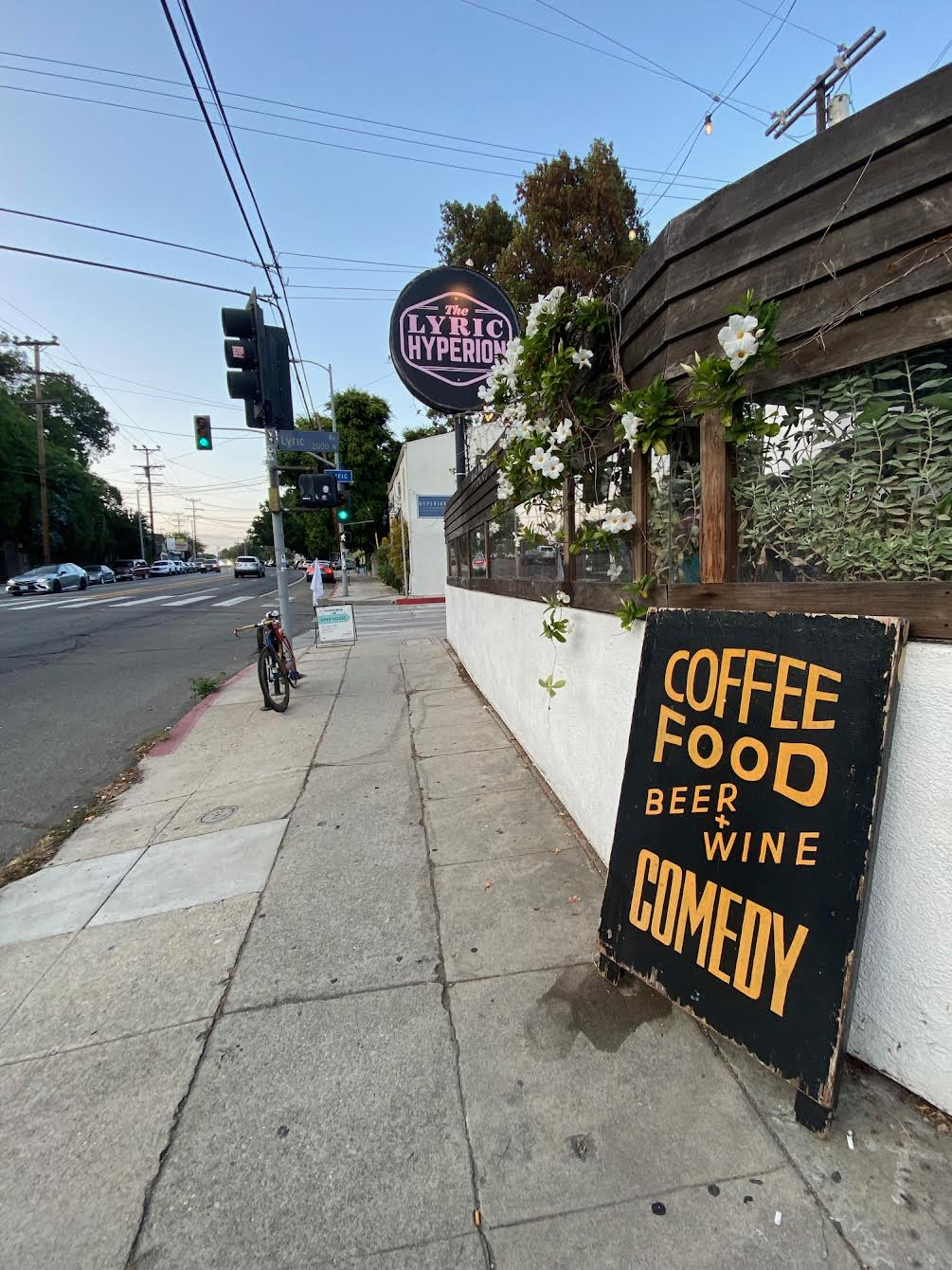
- The front of the Lyric Hyperion.
- Interactive map of The Lyric Hyperion Theatre & Cafe
- Address: 2106 Hyperion Avenue; Silver Lake, Los Angeles; United States

Website
- lyrichyperion.com

The Lyric Hyperion Theatre & Cafe is a longstanding mixed-use business in Silverlake, Los Angeles. It is a cafe by day and a theatre by night.

== History ==
The Lyric Hyperion began as the Bob White-owned Frog Pond gay restaurant and cabaret in the 1970s and '80s. In the late '80s, Leonard Nimoy and Richard Chamberlain's theatre troupe, Company of Angels, took over the business. Around 2000, it became the Lyric Hyperion under Alan Becker, named after Lyric Avenue and Hyperion Avenue at whose intersection it's situated. Mark Sherman took over the space in 2016. In late 2022 the theatre was brought under operation by Sean Casey, owner of The Glendale Room and past owner of M.I.'s Westside Comedy Theater in Santa Monica. The theatre is an 85-seat black box and is used for shows ranging from puppetry, drag, and cabaret, to stand-up comedy, plays, and open mics.
