= The Dead Authors Podcast =

Comedy podcast

- Genre: Comedy
- Language: English

Cast and voices
- Hosted by: Paul F. Tompkins (as H.G. Wells)

Music
- Theme music composed by: Eban Schletter

Production
- Production: Paul F. Tompkins & Ben Zelevansky
- Length: 60 minutes

Technical specifications
- Audio format: MP3

Publication
- No. of episodes: 66
- Original release: September 20, 2011 – December 31, 2015
- Updates: Monthly

Related
- Website: thedeadauthorspodcast.libsyn.com

The Dead Authors Podcast is an improvised comedy and faux-historical podcast hosted by Paul F. Tompkins in character as H.G. Wells, with special written material provided by Ben Zelevansky. The show ran from 2011 until 2015. In each episode, Wells collects a deceased author via his "time machine" to discuss their life and work. The podcast was created in support of 826LA, and all proceeds from the show are donated to the organization.

== History ==
The podcast was recorded live on a monthly basis at the UCB Theater in Los Angeles.

When Chapter 39 was released in 2014, Tompkins announced that the podcast would be ending with Chapter 50 the following year. Tompkins commented on the show's ending in an interview with Vulture:

Yes, for a while I was able to feel like I had the energy to do several projects at once. Ultimately, some of these things I did not get paid for, they did not further my career, they were done just for fun. I suddenly remembered my career was supposed to be fun by itself. It would probably be better if I focused on my main sources of income and made those as good as I could possibly make them. It felt as if all of my projects were suffering in that I couldn't give them the time and attention that I wanted. I had to make some tough decisions and really pare it down, which would also leave room to participate in other people's things and not be having to beg off because I've over-committed myself to projects that I have created.

== Episode list ==
No.	Title	Special guest	Original release date
1	"Chapter 1: Emily Dickinson"	Andy Richter	September 20, 2011
2	"Chapter 3: Dorothy Parker"	Jen Kirkman	November 8, 2011
3	"Chapter 4: Benjamin Franklin"	Scott Aukerman	December 6, 2011
4	"Appendix A: Charles Dickens and O.Henry"	Hal Lublin / Marc Evan Jackson	December 20, 2011
5	"Chapter 5: Carl Sagan"	Matt Gourley	January 17, 2012
6	"Chapter 6: Gertrude Stein"	John Ross Bowie	February 14, 2012
7	"Chapter 7: P.G. Wodehouse"	Brian Stack	March 20, 2012
8	"Appendix B: Friedrich Nietzsche and H.P. Lovecraft"	James Adomian / Paul Scheer	May 1, 2012
9	"Chapter 8: Aesop"	Mark McConville	May 29, 2012
10	"Chapter 9: Jorge Luis Borges"	Nick Kroll	July 24, 2012
11	"Chapter 10: Arthur Conan Doyle"	Chris Tallman	October 12, 2012
12	"Chapter 11: J.R.R. Tolkien"	Matt Walsh	October 23, 2012
13	"Chapter 12: Mary Shelley"	Laraine Newman	October 31, 2012
14	"Chapter 19: The Authors of the Gospels"	Craig Cackowski / Mark Gagliardi; Hal Lublin / Matt Gourley	December 24, 2012
15	"Chapter 13: The Brothers Grimm"	Jeremy Carter / Matt Gourley	December 31, 2012
16	"Chapter 14: Abbie Hoffman"	Jen Kirkman	January 22, 2013
17	"Chapter 15: The Marquis de Sade"	Andy Daly	March 25, 2013
18	"Chapter 16: Gore Vidal"	Marc Evan Jackson	April 2, 2013
19	"Chapter 17: Agatha Christie"	Jessica Chaffin	April 16, 2013
20	"Chapter 18: Brendan Behan"	Brian Stack	May 1, 2013
21	"Chapter 2: Robert Louis Stevenson"	Andy Daly	May 13, 2013
22	"Chapter 20: Ayn Rand"	John Hodgman	June 20, 2013
23	"Chapter 21: Joseph Campbell"	Jeremy Carter	October 15, 2013
24	"Chapter 22: Edgar Rice Burroughs"	Chris Tallman	October 22, 2013
25	"Chapter 23: Charlotte Brontë"	Jessica St. Clair	October 29, 2013
26	"Chapter 24: Plato"	Jason Mantzoukas	November 5, 2013
27	"Chapter 25: Shel Silverstein"	Mark McConville	November 12, 2013
28	"Chapter 26: William S. Burroughs"	Kurt Braunohler	November 19, 2013
29	"Chapter 27: Tennessee Williams"	Kristen Schaal	November 26, 2013
30	"Chapter 28: Walt Whitman"	James Adomian	December 3, 2013
31	"Chapter 29: Clement Clarke Moore and Irving Berlin"	Scott Aukerman / Neil Campbell	December 17, 2013
32	"Chapter 31: Anne Frank"	Jamie Denbo	February 18, 2014
33	"Chapter 32: E. Gary Gygax"	Chris Tallman	March 19, 2014
34	"Chapter 33: Rod Serling"	John Ross Bowie	April 15, 2014
35	"Chapter 30: William Faulkner"	Thomas Lennon	May 13, 2014
36	"Chapter 34: Roald Dahl"	Ben Schwartz	May 29, 2014
37	"Chapter 35: Oscar Wilde"	Jon Daly	June 17, 2014
38	"Chapter 36: Ralph Ellison"	DeMorge Brown	July 29, 2014
39	"Appendix C: Edgar Allan Poe and J.D. Salinger"	Craig Cackowski / Marc Evan Jackson	August 5, 2014
40	"Chapter 37: Truman Capote"	Jessica Chaffin	August 14, 2014
41	"Appendix D: Kurt Vonnegut, Jr. and Erma Bombeck"	Seth Morris / Brian Huskey	September 25, 2014
42	"Appendix E: Lord Byron and Norman Mailer"	Dana Gould / Frank Conniff	October 3, 2014
43	"Chapter 38: Ian Fleming"	Matt Gourley	October 9, 2014
44	"Chapter 39: Flannery O'Connor"	Lennon Parham	October 21, 2014
45	"Appendix F: Ernest Hemingway and Sun Tzu"	Josh Fadem / Fred Armisen	November 7, 2014
46	"Chapter 40: Virginia Woolf"	Mary Holland	November 20, 2014
47	"Appendix G: F. Scott Fitzgerald and James Joyce"	Andy Daly, Sean Conroy	December 5, 2014
48	"Chapter 41: Dr. Seuss"	Hal Lublin	December 24, 2014
49	"Appendix H: Hunter S. Thompson and Philip K. Dick"	James Adomian / Matt Besser	January 16, 2015
50	"Chapter 42: Miguel de Cervantes"	Horatio Sanz	January 27, 2015
51	"Chapter 43: Iceberg Slim"	Ron Funches	February 26, 2015
52	"Chapter 44: Confucius"	Eugene Cordero	March 16, 2015
53	"Chapter 45 [Part 1]: L. Ron Hubbard"	Andy Daly	April 14, 2015
54	"Chapter 46: Hans Christian Andersen"	Joe Wengert	May 19, 2015
55	"Chapter 47: Mark Twain*"	Matt Gourley	June 23, 2015
56	"Chapter 45 [Part 2]: L. Ron Hubbard"	Andy Daly	June 30, 2015
57	"Addendum i: Lewis Carroll"	Rory Scovel	July 10, 2015
58	"Chapter 48: Maya Angelou"	Tymberlee Hill	July 14, 2015
59	"Addendum ii: Christopher Marlowe"	Matt Gourley	July 17, 2015
60	"Addendum iii: Aleister Crowley"	Matt Gourley	July 24, 2015
61	"Addendum iv: Lucy Maud Montgomery"	Ryan Beil	July 31, 2015
62	"Addendum v: William Butler Yeats"	David Rees	August 7, 2015
63	"Addendum vi: Beatrix Potter"	Lauren Lapkus	August 14, 2015
64	"Chapter 49: Albert Camus"	Steve Agee	August 18, 2015
65	"Preface: Henry Miller and Sylvia Plath"	Eddie Pepitone / Jen Kirkman	December 28, 2015
66	"Chapter 50: L. Frank Baum"	Chris Tallman	December 31, 2015

*Episode 55 marks the only episode where Paul F. Tompkins does not appear as H.G. Wells, appearing instead as the guest Mark Twain while Matt Gourley hosts the show as Carl Sagan.

=== Recurring guests ===
Several comedians made numerous appearances on the podcast, playing multiple characters.

- Matt Gourley (7 episodes)
- Andy Daly (5 episodes)
- Chris Tallman (4 episodes)
- Hal Lublin (3 episodes)
- Jen Kirkman (3 episodes)
- Marc Evan Jackson (3 episodes)
- Brian Stack (2 episodes)
- Craig Cackowski (2 episodes)
- James Adomian (3 episodes)
- Jessica Chaffin (2 episodes)
- John Ross Bowie (2 episodes)
- Mark McConville (2 episodes)
- Scott Aukerman (2 episodes)
