= Hoopla Impro =

Improvised comedy and drama company

- Founded: 2006
- Founder: Steve Roe and Edgar Fernando
- Purpose: Improvised drama and comedy
- Location: The Miller, London Bridge
- Website: www.hooplaimpro.com

Hoopla Impro is an improvised comedy and drama company that was founded in January 2006 by Steve Roe and Edgar Fernando. Originally based in Balham southwest London, its shows moved to The Miller in London Bridge in 2010 and is the first and longest running improv theatre in the UK.

During that time it has grown to become the UK's biggest improvisation training school, teaching thousands of people every year at venues around London. It has collaborated with Google, Facebook, Apple, ITV and Imperial College, and the company has been recommended by Time Out, The Evening Standard and The Daily Telegraph.

In 2017 the company refurbished the Hoopla Improv Theatre, becoming a permanent venue above The Miller. The venue launched in October with a 50-hour improvathon, featuring over 200 improvisers from across the UK.

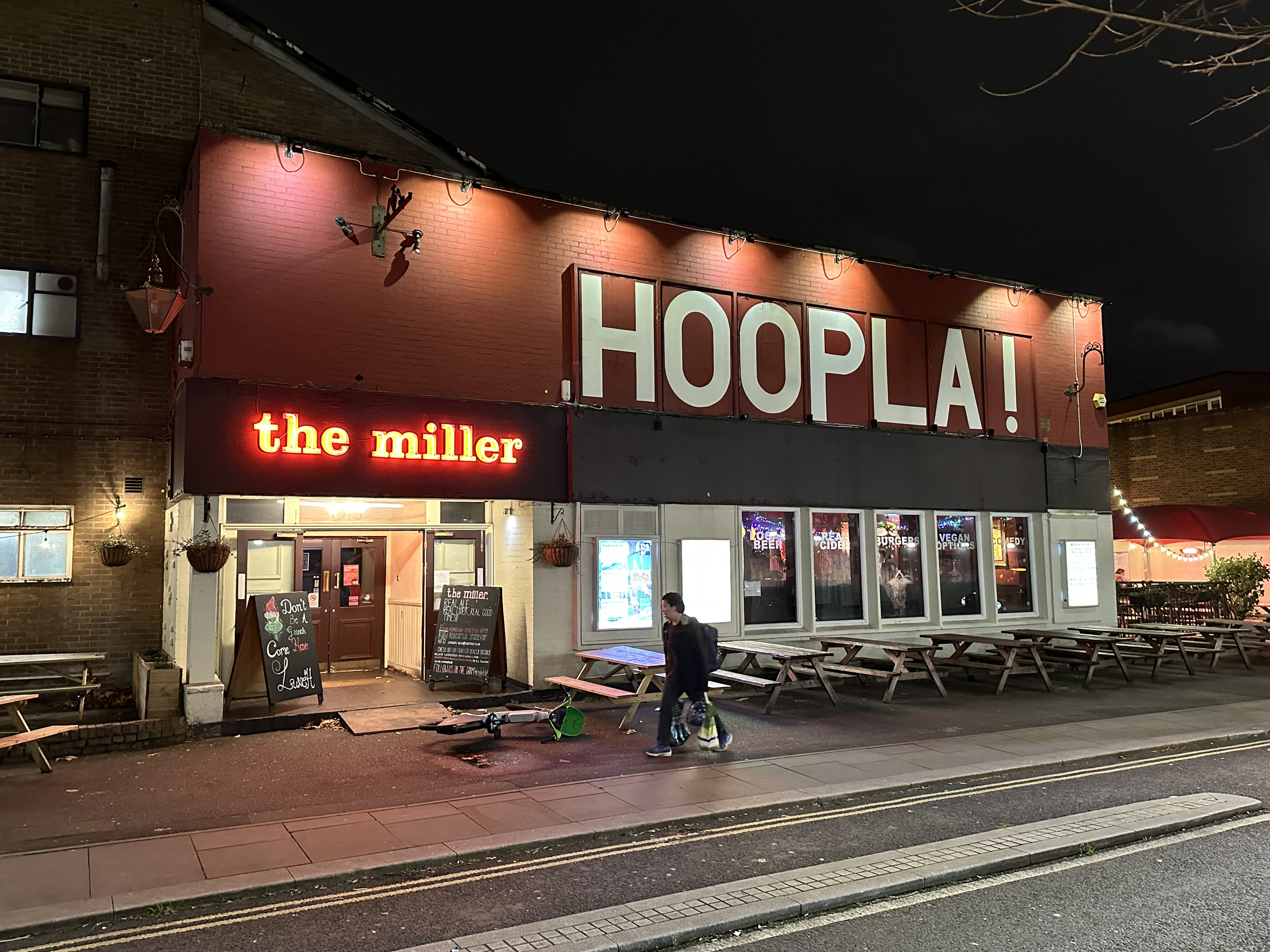
The Miller pub in London Bridge, Hoopla's main venue for shows.

== Annual Hoopla Improv Marathon ==
Hoopla runs an annual non-stop show for 29 hours every September, starting from 7pm on the Friday through to midnight on Saturday. It includes over 200 performers - many of whom are present throughout - and over 50 shows.

== Hoopla's UK & Ireland Improv Festival ==
In 2019 Hoopla launched an Improv Festival in London, bringing together improvised comedy acts from around the United Kingdom and Ireland. Among the performances were The Actor's Nightmare, Music Box and The Committee.

== Hoopla's 20th Anniversary Festival ==
Hoopla celebrated its 20th anniversary in the Spring of 2026 with a massive festival featuring groups showcasing the past, present, and future of Hoopla. The festival featured groups that performed early on at Hoopla and went on to perform on The West End, TV & Radio. This includes: Showstopper! The Improvised Musical, Austentatious, Abandoman and Mischief Theatre (who later went on to do The Play That Goes Wrong) plus members of the Comedy Store Players.

== Regular Performers ==
The listed teams are Hoopla-produced house teams, and regular weekend show performers.

Name	Improv Type	Date Established	Members	Reference
Comediasians	Short-form and Long-form	2019	Tulasi Das, Jillian Ellis, Simon Gomes, Mohini Kotecha, Stephen Lee, Aaron Punnen, Yuyu Rau, Gurinder Sandhu, Anasuya Sharma, Anupam Sharma, James Taverner, Holly Thompson, Sheila Ung, Stephen Wan, Duncan Wrigley, Kelsey Yuhara	
The Descendants	Narrative long-form House Team	2018	Carly Brazier, Carsten Jung, Jess Williamson, Leo Maxwell, Lisa Ronaghan, Matt Cosgrove, Matt Sparkes, Matt Stainsby, Sarah McKinless, Sarah Wiliams, Will Sebastian, Chloe Wittet	
Do Not Adjust Your Stage	Long-form	2010	Rhys Collier, Tim Grewcock, Shaun Lowthian, Helen O'Donnell, Nick Oram, Freya Parker, Clare Plested, Freya Slipper, Matt Stevens	
Do The Right Scene (originally named Nu Z Land)	Multiple	2017	Tai Campbell, Monica Gaga, Athena Kugblenu, Kemah Bob, Adam Courting, Joel Semakula, Mary Parker, Rosie Bergonzi, Joshua Jackson, Folusho Falegan	
Dreamweaver Quartet	Musical Long-form	2017	James Witt, Greg Birks, Francesca Reid, James Irving, Rhiannon Vivian, Fraser Parry	
GÄMEZ	Short-form House Team	2018	Alastair Thomas, Alice Hudson, Charlotte Gaughan, Chloé Dall’Olio, Dave Heron, Ella Bamforth, Euan Brown, Harriet Hughes, Harry Turnbull, Jack Turner, Jessie Rutland, Miriam Hall, Nadine Bailey, Nell Guy, Rachael Fernandes, Ryan J Murphy, Stephen Wan, Tom Bridge, Unai Garcia	
Grand Theft Impro	Improvised Sketch	2003	Dylan Emery, Phil Whelans, Charlotte Gittins, Alan Marriott	
The Maydays	Long-form	2003	Heather Urquhart, Jen Rowe, Rebecca MacMillan, Liz Peters, Jules Munns, Rhiannon Vivian, Joe Samuel, Juwel Haque, Jenny Haufek	
Michelle	Long-form House Team	2019	Chris Rosser, Folusho Falegan, Jon Nguyen, Kate Heward, Lilla Hodossy, Isabelle Glinn, Tom Jacob-Ewles, Mandeep Singh, Melissa Parker, Michael Kunze, Will Dixon, Paul Creasy, Reanne Farley, Sabrina Luisi, Teresa Senyah	
Music Box	Musical Long-form	2009	Andrew Gentilli, Greg Birks, Rachel Lyons, Rory Vierya, Lewis Harrison-Barker, Ben Tailor-Hamblin, Tom Hodge	
Track 96	Hip Hop	2019	Alicia Mungford, Amelia Mehra, Carsten Jung, Hugh Edwards, Katy Schutte, Michael Kunze, Miriam Hall, Russ Morgan, Sanj Surati, Tulasi Das	
The Playground	Multiple	2015	Breaking & Entering: Maria Peters, Lauren Shearing. Regular guests: Rachel Parris, Suki Webster, Amy Cooke-Hodgson, Charlotte Gittins, Pippa Evans, Ruth Bratt, Briony Redman	
The RH Experience	Long-form	2008	Conor Jatter, Luke Spillane, Tom Webster, Will Dixon, Dan Attfield, Ben Murphie, Ella Jean, Tom Bacon	
Whoop Ass!	Short-form	2025	Melissa Parker, Greg Birks, Phoebe Kozinets, Mandeep Singh, Isabelle Glinn, Pip Palmer, Hannah Warman, Sam Bartley, Bec Bartley, Liam Brennan, Victor Arctutus Estrella, Andrew Gentilli, Boo Miller, Monica Gaga, Chris Rosser	

== Diversity ==
Hoopla aims to promote diversity in improv and comedy. Hoopla hosts a monthly night for BAME players, run by Do The Right Scene. After a 'Crash Landing' workshop, it presents a performance called 'Special Delivery'. Zeal and runs an LGBT 'Loud and Queer' night at Hoopla. The Playground is an all-female monthly night run by Lauren Shearing and Maria Peters's two-person improv show Breaking & Entering. In 2016 it was named by Time Out as one of "Six all-female comedy gigs not to miss this spring".

Hoopla offers a number of diversity scholarships to people who are unemployed or on low-income, students, key workers, over 60s, under 23, homeless or in sheltered accommodation or BAME.

== Media coverage ==
Hoopla Impro's work has featured in several leading publications in the United Kingdom. In April 2014, the Evening Standard of London reported on the rise of tech workers in the city attending improvisation classes at Hoopla. In 2017, the British Comedy Guide reported how The Miller was becoming Hoopla Improv's dedicated venue, starting with a 50-hour improvisation marathon.

In June 2019, author Jessica Pan wrote an article for the Guardian on her experiences from a visit to Hoopla.

== Saturday Night Live UK Connections ==
Several of the current SNL UK cast members and writers have performed at Hoopla. SNL writer Lorna Rose Treen joined a Hoopla house team in 2021 and regularly performed at Hoopla until 2023 doing both improv and sketch. Cast member Al Nash performed sketch comedy regularly at Hoopla in the early stages of his career. Writer Omodara Olatunji has performed both improv and stand-up at Hoopla with Do The Right Scene.
