= SF Sketchfest =

Annual comedy festival

SF Sketchfest, the San Francisco Comedy Festival
- Genre: Sketch comedy, Improvisation, Stand-up comedy, Movies, Television, Podcasts, Music
- Date of premiere: 2002
- Location: San Francisco, CA, U.S.
- Official website

SF Sketchfest, or The San Francisco Comedy Festival, is an American comedy festival founded in 2002 by Bay Area actor-comedians David Owen, Janet Varney and Cole Stratton. It takes place every January and February in a variety of Bay Area venues and features a mix of sketch comedy, stand-up comedy, improv comedy, music, tributes, live podcasts, and other special events.

In January 2019, Boxcar Theatre hosted the "SF Sketchfest at The Speakeasy", where they co-produced six immersive comedy shows.

SF Sketchfest was canceled in 2021 and 2022, due to the COVID-19 pandemic. It returned in 2023 at the Civic Center's Sydney Goldstein Theatre, during which the Upright Citizens Brigade performed ASSSSCAT. The festival issued mask requirements for most shows. Reportedly, the protocols were only sometimes enforced.

SF Sketchfest 2026, its 23rd edition, took place on January 15 through February 1. It showcased more than 200 shows and featured over 500 performers from multiple nations. The Kids in the Hall appeared for the 30th anniversary of the film Brain Candy. The Jim Henson Company performed its show Puppet Up! Uncensored.
