= James Thomas Bailey =

American comedian

James Thomas Bailey is artistic director of CSz Los Angeles and founder and director of ComedySportz Los Angeles.

Bailey has produced more than 50 shows in Los Angeles, including Kitty Carlisle Hart in her one-woman show, My Life on the Wicked Stage and the west coast premiere of Robert Fulghum's All I Really Need to Know I Learned in Kindergarten. He has appeared on The Drew Carey Show and Tuesdays with Morrie, a film based on the best-selling novel. He was also a regular on the nationally syndicated television show Quick Witz and currently appears on World Cup Comedy on the PAX network. Bailey has served as a creative consultant and trainer for Universal Studios, Walt Disney Feature Animation, ABC and Coca-Cola, and others. Bailey also serves as a cultural specialist for the U.S. Department of State, and has consulted in Cyprus in conjunction with the American Embassy and State Theatre of Cyprus (THOC).

Bailey has served on the boards of the Los Angeles Stage Alliance (Theatre LA), the California Educational Theatre Association (CETA), the West Coast Ensemble Theatre and the advocacy committee of the California Alliance for Arts Education (CAAE). He also received the Professional Artist Award from the California Educational Theatre Association and the CETA Medallion for distinguished service to the organization. He was inducted into the California Thespians Hall of Fame. Bailey is currently the director of theatre for Justin-Siena High School in Napa and his high school league program is the largest teen improvisational program in the United States. Bailey also served as a guest artist for the Donna Reed Foundation for many years.
