= ComedySportz =

Improvisational comedy organization

Official logo of ComedySportz

ComedySportz (CSz) is an improvisational comedy organization started in 1984 in Milwaukee, Wisconsin, by a group of local comedians including Dick Chudnow, Karen Kolberg, Bob Orvis, Brian Green, and others.

== Match format ==
The traditional format of a ComedySportz match features two teams of improvisational performers ("Players"), competing in various rounds, using improv games and performing scenes. Audience members judge the results and award points as directed by the Referee. In every match, a ComedySportz referee monitors the action, awarding points, and administering Fouls as necessary. The flavor is somewhat like the television show Whose Line Is It Anyway?, though the ComedySportz organization precedes that show's debut by 4 years. The CSz format is a more competitive and For Everyone (content-wise) version of the Theatresports format, which preceded ComedySportz by 7 years.

ComedySportz penalties (put in place for the audience's benefit) include:

- Out of Bounds Foul: called when a player uses explicit language or refers to something crass or off-color. If the Out of Bounds Foul is called, the offending player or audience member must spend the remainder of the game outside the theater space. They may or may not be welcomed back in. (Originally called the "Brown Bag Foul", the player would have a brown paper bag placed on their head for the rest of the round but replaced by the "Out of Bounds Foul" due to COVID-19 in 2022.)
- Groaner Foul: whereby any player who speaks a pun bad enough to make the audience groan causing their team to lose one point (or awarding the other team with a point), unless their apology to the audience is heartfelt enough and accepted.

Example: Why does the Norwegian navy put barcodes on ships? So they can Scandenavian

- Any spontaneously generated Foul the referee feels is needed to move the match forward.

Although the image of competition is maintained, the teams are often dynamic, with rosters depending on which player (many of whom have other occupations ) are available for a match at any given time, and match outcomes are not pre-determined as audience voting/selected judges decide the winner.

== Organization ==
Official logo for CSz Worldwide

CSz Worldwide and ComedySportz are licensed by the World Comedy League Incorporated. There are over 28 cities with licensed ComedySportz organizations, most in the United States. In recent years, ComedySportz has been licensed in Manchester, England (although this team originated in Chorley, Lancashire).

Most ComedySportz cities operate their own "arenas," some with theatre type settings, others as nightclubs. Few (including ComedySportz Milwaukee) have their very own bar and restaurant. Sometimes the members of the comedic improv team also work sound and lights. The clean content and audience focused nature of the ComedySportz match allows CSz groups to perform thousands of road shows for corporate, college, church, school, and association clients each year; most CSz groups also lead corporate team-building workshops. In addition, players from some cities coach ComedySportz high school and middle school leagues, in which students perform in shows similar to those seen at the "professional" level.

== World Championship ==
Teams meet annually at the ComedySportz World Championship for a competitive tournament, training, and exchange of artistic, marketing, and organizational ideas. The location of the tournament rotates among the member cities. The first world championship that Milwaukee won was in 1988. The banner hangs in the Milwaukee stadium. The first World Championship in Milwaukee's new arena was August 4–7, 2004, also served as the Grand Opening for Milwaukee's all-new ComedySportz Arena at 420 South 1st Street in Milwaukee. In 2009, the World Championship returned to Milwaukee for the 25th anniversary celebration, and returned again in 2014 to celebrate both its 30th anniversary and rebranding of the logo.

Prior to 2004, this mostly annual event was billed as the "ComedySportz National Tournament."

In 2020 and 2021 due to the COVID-19 pandemic, World Championship was held online. Championship was not held in 2023, but resumed in Milwaukee for the 40th anniversary of ComedySportz in 2024.

The current titleholder is ComedySportz Jersey Shore who won the 37th World Championship on June 27, 2026.

=== Championship history ===
Year	Host city	World Champion
2027	Las Vegas	TBD
2026	Jersey Shore	Jersey Shore
2025	Quad Cities	Quad Cities
2024	Milwaukee	Milwaukee
2023	N/A	N/A
2022	Seattle, Washington	Seattle
2021	Online	Portland
2020	Online	Houston
2019	Philadelphia, Pennsylvania	Philadelphia
2018	Los Angeles, California	Los Angeles
2017	San Jose, California	San Jose
2016	Indianapolis	Indianapolis
2015	Quad Cities	Quad Cities
2014	Milwaukee	Milwaukee
2013	Buffalo, New York	Buffalo
2012	Chicago	Chicago
2011	Indianapolis	Indianapolis
2010	Philadelphia	Philadelphia
2009	Milwaukee	DRAW - Milwaukee & Twin Cities
2008	Portland, Oregon	Portland
2007	Quad Cities	Quad Cities
2006	San Jose, California	San Jose
2005	Los Angeles	Los Angeles
2004	Milwaukee	Twin Cities
2003	Washington DC	Washington DC
2002	Quad Cities	Quad Cities
2001	Chicago	Chicago
2000	Austin	Austin
1999	Portland	Portland
1998	Milwaukee	Milwaukee
1997	Quad Cities	Quad Cities
1996	Kansas City	Kansas City
1995	Milwaukee	Milwaukee
1994	Milwaukee	Milwaukee
1993	Milwaukee	New York City
1992	Milwaukee	New York City
1991	N/A	N/A
1990	Milwaukee	Milwaukee
1989	Milwaukee	Madison
1988	Milwaukee	Milwaukee

== Notable players and alumni ==
- Steve Agee (The Sarah Silverman Program)
- James Thomas Bailey (The Drew Carey Show)
- Joe Bereta (YouTube personality, Barats and Bereta)
- Wayne Brady (Whose Line Is It Anyway?, Let's Make A Deal)
- Liz Cackowski (writer, Saturday Night Live, Last Man On Earth)
- Frank Caeti (MADtv)
- Kay Cannon (producer/writer, 30 Rock, New Girl, Pitch Perfect, Pitch Perfect 2, Pitch Perfect 3)
- Jeremy Carter (Superego)
- Bill Chott (actor, Wizards of Waverly Place, Galaxy Quest, The Dana Carvey Show)
- Jeff Davis (Whose Line Is It Anyway?, Harmontown)
- Jack DeSena (actor, All That, Avatar: The Last Airbender)
- Matt Gourley (Superego, Drunk History, The Pistol Shrimps Radio, Conan O'Brien Needs a Friend)
- Dan Harmon (Community, Rick and Morty, Harmontown)
- Dustin Hodge (producer/writer, Little Britches Rodeo (TV series))
- Derek Mears (actor, Friday the 13th)
- Kevin Miller (voice actor) (Sly Cooper)
- Eric Christian Olsen (actor, NCIS: Los Angeles, Community, Beerfest)
- Jack Packard (RedLetterMedia contributor on Best Of The Worst)
- Eric Price (MADtv)
- Lauren Pritchard (MADtv)
- Rob Schrab (Scud: The Disposable Assassin, The Sarah Silverman Program)
- Iliza Shlesinger (stand-up comedian, winner of NBC's Last Comic Standing; numerous Netflix specials)
- Matt Sloan (director, voice actor, playwright, and comedian)
- Ari Stidham (actor, musician, Scorpion)
- Jason Sudeikis (cast, Ted Lasso, Saturday Night Live, Horrible Bosses)
- Nick Swardson (stand-up comedian, writer & producer, Reno 911!: Miami, Grown Ups 2)
- Chris Tallman (Thank God You're Here, The Thundermans)
- Victor Varnado (actor, comic book writer, End of Days)
- Jessica Williams (correspondent on The Daily Show , actor in The Incredible Jessica James)
- Colton Dunn (actor, writer, comic)
- Sasheer Zamata (comedian, actress and writer)
- Brendan Hunt (Ted Lasso)
- Lou Wilson (actor, comedian, Dropout TV, Dimension 20, Worlds Beyond Number)
- Jacob Wysocki (actor, comedian, Dropout TV, Dimension 20)

== See also ==
- Improvisational theatre
- Whose Line Is It Anyway?
- The Second City
- Saturday Night Live
- Theatresports
- List of improvisational theatre companies
