= Theatre for development =

Theatre for development (TfD) is a type of community-based or interactive theatre practice that aims to promote civic dialogue and engagement.

Theatre for development can be a kind of participatory theatre that encourages improvisation and allows audience members to take roles in the performance, or it can be fully scripted and staged, with the audience simply observing. Many productions are a blend of the two. The Theatre of the Oppressed, an influential collection of theatrical forms developed by Augusto Boal in the 1970s, aims to create dialogue and interaction between audience and performer as a means of promoting social and political change.

Hundreds, if not thousands, of organizations and initiatives have used theatre as a development tool: for education or propaganda, as therapy, as a participatory tool, or as an exploratory tool in development.

== Definitions and aims ==
Theatre for development can be seen as a progression from less interactive theatre forms to a more dialogical process, where theatre is practiced with the people or by the people as a way of empowering communities, listening to their concerns, and then encouraging them to voice and solve their own problems.

For Kabaso Sydney (2013), as reflected in Theatre for Development in Zambia, the term describes "modes of theatre whose objective is to disseminate messages, or to conscientize communities about their objective social political situation" (1993:48). Penina Mlama, referring to the enterprise as "popular theatre", summarizes its aims as follows: "…it aims to make the people not only aware of but also active participants in the development process by expressing their viewpoints and acting to better their conditions. Popular theatre is intended to empower the common man with a critical consciousness crucial to the struggle against the forces responsible for his poverty." (1991:67)

Theatre for development may encompass any of the following live performance types:

- spoken-word drama or comedy;
- music, singing and/or dance;
- movement without sound (mime);
- participatory or improvisational techniques; and/or
- the Living Newspaper.

== Subject matter ==
Theatre for development typically endeavors to build awareness about critical topics within a political or developmental context, often using an agitprop style. Especially in oppressive regimes, it may not be safe or possible to perform overtly political plays. Apart from political issues, common topics are non-formal education, hygiene, disposal of sewage, environment, women's rights, child abuse, prostitution, street children, health education, HIV/AIDS, literacy, etc.

== Techniques ==
Developmental theatre can utilize one or more of the following techniques or forms.

=== Forum theatre ===
Forum theatre, one of the interactive theatrical forms developed by Augusto Boal as part of his Theatre of the Oppressed, begins with the performance of a short scene.Often times, it is a scene in which a character is being oppressed in some way (for example, a typically chauvinist man mistreating a woman or a factory owner mistreating an employee). Audience members are now encouraged to not only imagine changing the situation of oppression but to actually practice that change, by coming on stage as "spect-actors" to replace the protagonist and act out an intervention to "break the oppression". Through this process, the participant is also able to realize and experience the challenges of achieving the improvements they suggested. The actors who welcome the spectator volunteering onto the stage play against the spectator's attempts to intervene and change the story, offering a strong resistance so that the difficulties in making any change are also acknowledged. By becoming part of the scene, participants dive into the situation performed, which makes the whole topic feel more real for the person who came in to change the situation. The technique provides an alternative process of problem solving, where creativity is asked for and different approaches are tried. Forum theatre functions as "a rehearsal for reality", as Augusto Boal called it.

=== Street theatre ===
Theatrical forms such as invisible theatre or image theatre can be performed in public spaces to be witnessed by passersby. Invisible theatre is intended to be indistinguishable from real-life, unstaged situations, so as to provoke thought or raise awareness among observing members of the public. Invisible theatre in the streets has the advantage of potentially reaching audiences who would never attend a workshop or watch a play.

=== Collaboration with community members ===
It is important for actors and organisers of the performance or TfD-project (Theatre for Development Project) to get to know the community and the problems its people face. Therefore, the play that is going to be performed and worked with has to be developed with local people who know the cultural behaviors and social problems of the community. Moreover, it is helpful to have local authority persons and opinion leaders in the team of a TfD-project, whom the community listens to and trusts. In this way, it is possible to take advantage of the knowledge that locals have about dates for performances or even to advertise for the ongoing TfD-performance.

=== Documentary theatre ===
Documentary Theatre uses accounts from documentary material such as articles, interviews, and public transcripts in order to create a performance that reflects upon specific events or movements in history. This type of theatre can be used to educate the audience on the subject matter and it is often used to prompt conversation about potentially sensitive topics or topics that do not receive extensive media coverage or coverage in popular culture.

==== Examples of Documentary theatre ====
The Laramie Project: Playwrights conducted interviews on the people of the town of Laramie, took news clippings, and also journal entries of the townspeople in order to implement them in the script.

Gloria a Life: The producers of the play recreated archival interviews and TV appearances of Gloria Steinem and brought them to life on stage through the actor playing Steinem.

One-Third of a Nation: This play incorporates accounts from the crisis surrounding The New York Housing Department using the technique of the Living Newspaper.

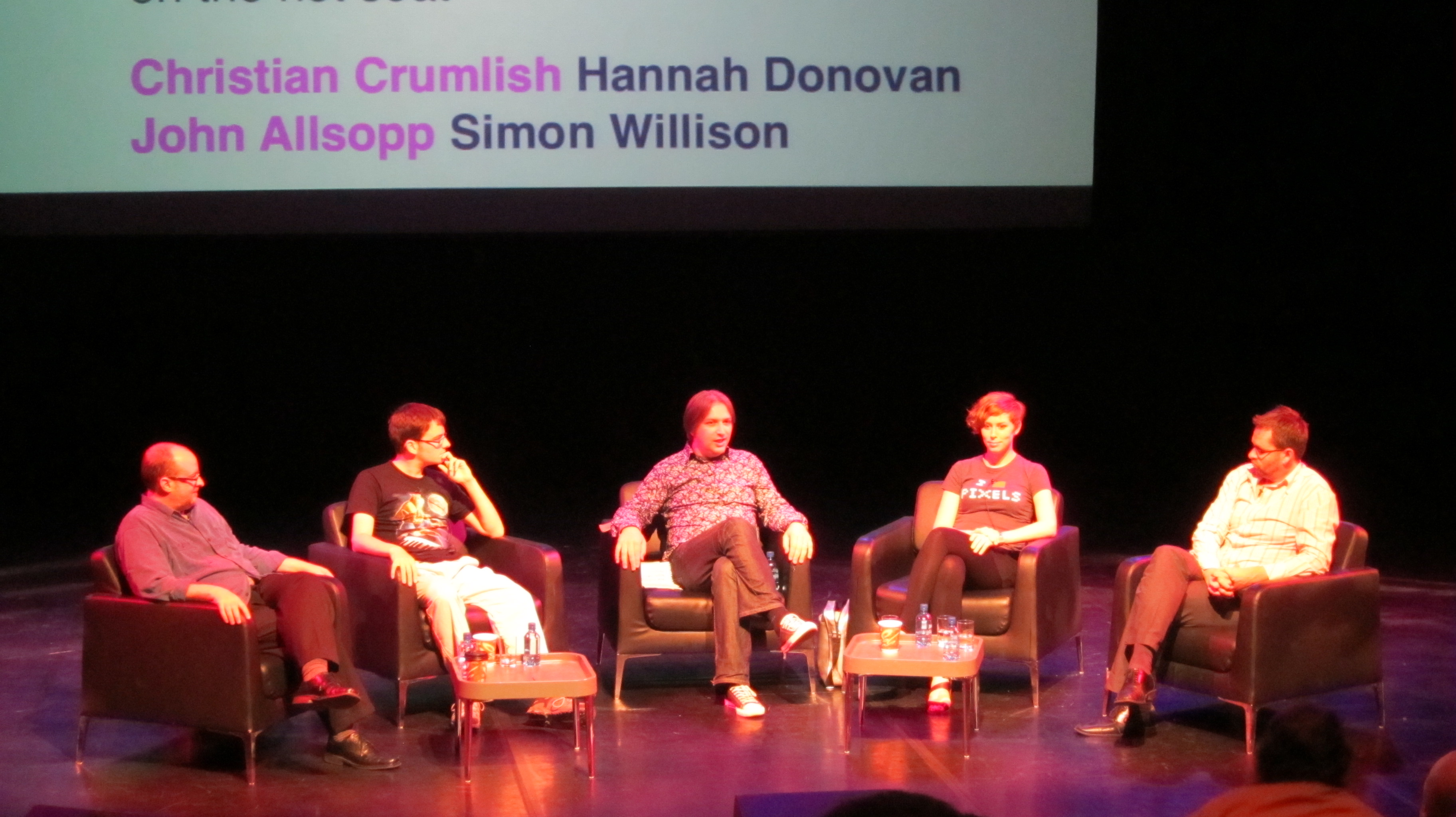
Artists giving a talkback after a show

=== Talkbacks ===
In a talkback, members of the cast, crew, and/or the creative team of a production remain after a production to host conversation. Talkbacks are most often utilized in conjunction with any of the other techniques listed above. They exist so not only the audience can ask questions and engage with the art and artists, but also so that the audience can share their perspective on the work that was performed.

== Theatre for young audiences ==
Efforts are also made to create impactful social and developmental theatre for younger audiences. Plays, musicals, and other performances can be created to specifically show to younger age demographics in order to teach them about topics they do not usually learn about or that may not be prevalent in their lives. The Yellow Boat, produced by Childsplay, comes with a learning guide for educators to open up conversations about HIV/AIDS and hemophilia.

Talkbacks are also utilized in order to get younger audiences to engage and come up with their own questions about any performance or the themes and issues that were mentioned in the show. They allow the audience to analyze the topics themselves and explore the real world topics that are being taught. This invites the younger demographic to become part of the solution and development in their community.

== Sources ==
- "Theatre and Development", a list of various TfD initiatives, compiled by KIT (Royal Tropical Institute), Amsterdam
- Sloman, Annie (2011): "Using Participatory Theatre in International Community Development", Community Development Journal.
- Amnesty International AI (2005): "Ben ni walen: Mobilising for human rights using participatory theatre".
- Epskamp, Kees (2006): Theatre for Development: An Introduction to Context, Applications & Training. London: Zed Books.
- Enacting Participatory Development: Theatre-based Techniques, by McCarthy, J., Cambridge University Press. 2004. The bibliography cites 22 books devoted specifically to art and theater as tools for development, and an additional 16 books on specific techniques.
- Theatre and Empowerment: Community Drama on the World Stage, by Boon, R. and Plastow, J. University of Leeds. 2004. Case studies from around the world of TfD.
- Theater as a Means of Moral Education and Socialization in the Development of Nauvoo, Illinois, 1839-1845, thesis by Hurd, L., California State University, Dominguez Hills. 2004.
- Online Discussion Group - Art4Development
- Mda, Zakes (1993): When People Play People. Development Communication Through Theatre. Johannesburg: Witwatersrand University Press.
- ActNow Theatre for Social Change Australia
- Collective Encounters: Theatre for Social Change UK
- Communication for Development Network UK
- Creative Social Change UK
- CTO - Center of Theatre of the Oppressed Brazil
- International Theatre of the Oppressed Organisation
- KURINGA - a space for Theatre of the Oppressed in Berlin Germany
- Jana Sanskriti - Center for Theatre of the Oppressed India
- CCDC - Centre for Community Dialogue and Change, Bengaluru, India - Promoting Theatre of the Oppressed
- Act Out - Theatre for Transformation Perth, Australia
- "The problem with Theatre for Development in contemporary Malawi" by Zindaba Chisiza, Leeds African Studies Bulletin, 78 (2016–17).
