= Interactive theatre =

Theatre that breaks the fourth wall

Interactive theatre is a presentational or theatrical form or work that breaks the "fourth wall" that traditionally separates the performer from the audience both physically and verbally.

In traditional theatre, performance is limited to a designated stage area and the action of the play unfolds without audience members, who function as passive observers. Conversely, in interactive theatre, the performance engages directly with audience members, making them active participants in the piece. Interactive theatre often goes hand in hand with immersive theatre, which brings the audience into the same playing space as the performers. They may be asked to hold props, supply performance suggestions (as in improvisational theatre), share the action's real-world (non-theatrical) setting (as in site-specific theatre and immersive theatre), or become characters in the performance. They may also be asked to participate in altering the course of the play by collectively voting to steer the plot in a new direction, as with Augusto Boal's forum theatre. In therapeutic and educational settings, they may even be invited to discuss pertinent issues with the performers.

Interactive theatre is not made for only entertainment, but is often produced to illustrate real-life political and moral debates. It allows the audience to become immersed as participants and to become the primary reason for the production. They may even become the show's main characters. Interactives productions are designed to create a sense of reality, where the location and setting sets the tone of the production. Space is an important factor: Interactive set designers "want rooms with character, with personality, so that we can work with [an audience member] as we would an actor."

Theatre companies and shows that regularly utilize audiences interactively include The Second City, pH, Supernatural Chicago, Dungeonmaster, Mystery on the Lake Productions, and Walkabout Theatre.

== Precursors ==
There have been several stage shows where audience members can actively alter the plot. Examples include:

- The Mystery of Edwin Drood - This musical adaptation of Charles Dickens' unfinished novel is considered a solve-it-yourself mystery. During a break in the show, the audience votes on an ending, with 7 possible outcomes.
- Night of January 16th – In this 1934 courtroom drama by Ayn Rand, the audience takes on the role of the jury. They decide if the defendant is "guilty" or "not guilty", leading to one of two possible outcomes.
- American Standard - American Standard by R.B. Ripley and Ryan Dixon, focused on three characters who conned, stole and murdered their way through the narrative in the hopes of hiding a deadly secret that had the power to change the course of American politics. While the story on stage had a linear narrative, each audience member was provided with a headset and small switch device dubbed a 'thought box' that allowed them to enter the inner thoughts of the characters onstage during the play. During the performance, audience members were able to choose which character's thoughts to listen to, switch back and forth between them or simply take the headset off and watch the 'play' transpire on stage. The original production of American Standard premiered at the 2005 Los Angeles Edgefest. It was directed by Ryan Dixon and co-starred Katy Mixon.
- The Boomerang Kid, by Chris Econn, introduced a new interactive theatrical element by allowing the audience to choose on behalf of the main character throughout the narrative, in real time, leading to over 50 possible story variations. The audience made their decisions with hand held wireless technology that was given to them before the beginning of the show. The original 2007 production, directed by Ryan Dixon, ran in Los Angeles and co-starred Josh Andrew Koenig as the "M.C.".
- Interactive theatre in Soviet Russia developed from the Russian Civil War (1917-1922). This Interactive theatre was used primarily to spread ideology, which was done by having the audience participate in reenactments of the worker's victories over the Tsar and his army. The use of interactive theatre helped spread information as two out of ten people could not read, and theatre began to replace the role of the newspaper. These performances were seen in plays such as Mystery-Bouffe, Great Revolution, and The Glorification of Revolution, which incorporated the audience to perform with actors on large makeshift platforms outdoors. Each of these plays would have the audience be a part of either the Tsar's military or the workers revolting. Another form of interactive theatre in Soviet Russia during 1920 was improvised dialogue and stories called Agit-trials. This allowed the audience to connect to the current socio-political climate and allowed the audience to freely speak by having the audience play the part as the judge or other roles in these plays. However, this freedom in theatre was revoked during 1930 when Joseph Stalin and the Communist Party controlled the use of theatre, limiting the audience to the point of not being able to improvise with stricter scripts. With the death of Stalin in 1953, Nikita Khrushchev began to reopen theatres that were closed by authorities under Stalin's rule with less restrictions. However, this did not last and the implementation of the "Ministry of Culture" oversaw and revised plays that were deemed dangerous or anti-soviet and adjusted plays that seemed too pessimistic or critical. This prompted playwrights to embed suggestions within their plays to the audience where they could create different narratives compared to what the ministry was officially viewing. During the late 1980s restrictions on plays became less stringent allowing for the resurgence of interactive theatre. During the 1990s the resurgence of interactive theatre became more personalized towards the audience, converting spectator interactivity from large groups to singular audience members to come to the stage. This form of interactive theatre is utilized in Nina Belenitskaya's play Anonymous Artists. Within this play interactivity allows audience members to imagine they are successful actors, writers or creators, conducting interviews with artists and giving awards to them as well. This ability to exert personal experiences and act anonymously provided an ability to its audience to speak openly.

== Contemporary Examples ==
- Sleep No More - a mash-up of Shakespeare's Macbeth and 1930s film noir that combines elements of theatre, dance, and haunted fun house in a five-story warehouse space retrofitted as the fictitious McKittrick Hotel
- 66 Minutes in Damascus: A hard-hitting multi-sensory performance that premiered at the London International Festival of theatre (2012) and is considered one of the most extreme kinds of interactive theatre put on stage, where the audience play the part of kidnapped tourists in today's Syria in a hyperreal sensory environment
- There are several forms Interactive theatre can take. In a production piece You Me Bum Bum Train, audience members are encouraged to play roles either assigned or chosen. In this specific production the characters play a variety of roles that range from a football coach to a famous rock star. Interactive theatre is not entirely based on dialogue. In plays such as Tony and Tina's Wedding, the audience becomes silent guests that slowly immerse themselves into the production. Audience members are all immersed into the play yet no two people experience the same thing. In fact, even several visits to the same production can cause an audience member to come out with a completely different approach. "The real-life citizen is both a performer and an audience in a play that he or she has had a hand in creating."

== Video Games and Theatre ==
Recent experiments in blending video games and theatre on stage include various works by Berlin theatre company Rimini Protokoll, such as their 2010 work, Best Before. As outlined in the book, PLAY: Dramaturgies of Participation (Playwrights Canada Press, 2024) by Jenn Stephenson and Mariah Horner, a particularly exploration of incorporating video games into theatre has emerged in Canada since the late 2010s, including works such as Foxconn Frequency No.3 by Hong Kong Exile, The Archive of Missing Things by Zuppa, Alone Together by Secret Theatre, asses.masses by Canadian artists Patrick Blenkarn and Milton Lim, and 2021 by Guilty by Association.

Combining interactive theatre and video games allows modern day playwrights and authors to create immersive plotlines. Interactive theatre and video games previously were two separate entities, but are now being combined. theatre provides the audience with lessons the viewer can interpret through plot, meanwhile video games provide the gamer with a storyline that they can alter. There are possible drawbacks to blurring lines between video games and interactive theatre: the author may be discredited by intertwining the two. Video games and interactive theatre can break the classic appearance of a story. Connecting the two visual mediums of entertainment deters the player from drawing conclusions that are explicitly shown through the plotline. Realism can be difficult to achieve when the lines are blurred regarding plot, scenery, and conversation due to the fact that structure is not followed and imagination can change reality. The audience may draw a different conclusion than if they became a player, because participation changes the outcome. Video games limit the player to a linear pre-written game script organized by the game developers. Although video games present some control over the development of the story, players are not the playwrights of the game. Video games are vital to the formation of emotional connections between a gamer and player.

== Interactive theatre as a teaching tool ==
Many medical students, as of 2012 are receiving training assistance from theatre and drama instructors in interactive theatre and role play to help prepare them for real world situations in which they will be delivering a medical diagnosis to patients who test positive for cancer, "teaching breaking bad news to medical students." Medical students attend interactive theatre classes where hired actors role play with the medical student. The medical student is put in different health care setting scenarios where she or he delivers a terminal diagnosis to the actor patient and the actor acts out a variety of different emotional responses. This enables the medical student to experience what she may encounter in the future when working with real patients. The purpose of this activity is to enable the future doctor to prepare herself for a variety of emotional outcomes where she will be able to deliver difficult news with the best bedside manner possible.

By knowing what to expect the medical student can train themselves to react calmly and professionally. Studies done to determine the effectiveness of this sensitivity training program show that the program is successful. When surveyed the majority of participating medical school students reported they were more prepared for real life situations as a result of having participated in interactive theatre. Out of 451 students who volunteered in a survey regarding the effectiveness of the program 89-94% agreed that using interactive role play theatre as an adjunct to their medical training helped them become better at communicating difficult news to an ill patient.

== Virtual Reality ==
Virtual Reality immersive narrative allows different points of view: in first-person the audience experiences the main characters story; in first-person peripheral, the audience acts as a supporting character following the main character's story; in second-person, it is in the perspective of "you;" in third-person limited, the audience only knows what the character knows; in third-person multiple, few characters thoughts are known; and, in third-person omniscient, the viewer knows everyone in the story.

== Youth movement ==
Contemporary theatres must address audiences who try to interact with the stage. Millennial audiences are not following traditional theatre rules and etiquette. In 2012, at the Vivian Beaumont theatre, two teenage youth touched a stage prop horse. Their actions were left unnoticed. This type of behavior has been on the rise in the past decade, with more and more young audience members opposing traditional theatre rules and norms. A possible reason for this is how millennials are being brought up today. Following World War II, the audience's dominance over theatre judgement was up for discussion. As a result, a new social contract was created where audience members took a more casual viewing approach to plays.

== Interactive theatre in interpersonal relationships ==
Researchers from the School of Nursing at University of Texas, Austin use CBPR (community-based participatory research) to teach youths the dynamics of a healthy relationship since they are at a formative age. 114 seventh grade Latino students in a Texas health class participated in interactive play. Study subjects were chosen for their age since the researchers believed that they would be able to grasp and apply these teachings easier as they are in a formative period of their lives. Interactive theatre is seen as an efficient and unconventional way to educate students about complex information that can be easier to grasp in a setting and situation that appeals to their attention compared to traditional classroom settings that tend to be less engaging. It was imperative for this study to be engaging to its subjects since the topics of harassment, abuse, and impending relationship dynamics are often difficult to talk about. Youth engagement allows for a fun and interactive way for them to understand such crucial issues. In order to determine the specific topics and situations in which to focus, researchers compiled a list of issues they believed would be beneficial and relevant to young adult lives. Topics include: healthy compared to unhealthy relationships, anti-bullying/anti-sexual harassment education and changing in-school environments. Since this study was conducted over the course of multiple days, the first day consisted of three actors in which they acted out scenes that depicted unhealthy tendencies in relationships. After a demonstration by these actors, the students observed the study more closely and broke up the scenes to analyze each unhealthy habit. The students were encouraged to come up with various ways they could re-address the problems, then the students analyzed the issues again in addition to acting out their own solutions to exercise the knowledge they obtained from the previous days. They were asked to connect the play to their own lives and help conceive the top ten rules to stop such dangerous behaviors as well as reflect on the effectiveness of this unconventional learning strategy. The researchers concluded that interactive theatre was an effective medium to allow students to feel comfortable about the serious topics.

== Types of interactive theatre ==
- Design Theatre
- Script Writing
- Forum theatre
- Community theatre
- Invisible theatre
- Theatre for Early Years
- Immersive Theatre
- Playback Theatre

== See also ==
- Theatre of the Oppressed
- Interactive installations
- Participatory theatre
- Odyssey Works
