= Theatre Versus Oppression =

British charity

Theatre Versus Oppression (TVO) is a UK registered charity which specialises in using Applied Theatre techniques to bring about positive change and development in communities and individuals. TVO works with people who have experienced oppression using applied theatre techniques and counselling methods to allow them to explore and speak out about their experiences.

The charity has worked with people who have experienced many different forms of oppression including refugee situations, human trafficking, torture, domestic abuse, and gang related issues. In the course of its work TVO has, "brought [members] into contact with the most varied groups in countries around the globe. Some [groups] were involved with theatre, but many were not ... [TVO] has worked in schools, colleges and universities, prisons, hospitals, refugee camps, community support venues and theatres". The charity was founded and is directed by Jennifer S Hartley.

== Principles and techniques ==
Theatre Versus Oppression employs techniques of applied theatre and techniques adapted from the Theatre of the Oppressed developed by Augusto Boal.

== History ==
Theatre Versus Oppression was founded in 2000 by Jennifer S. Hartley and gained charitable status in the UK in 2007. Initially the group began as "an informal grouping of like-minded people who wanted to use forms of theatre in issue-based situations in their free time". TVO has been undertaken projects in many areas of the world including Latin America, North America, Africa, and Europe. TVO has worked with people on a variety of issues including domestic abuse, culminating in the play 'Til Death Do Us Part' which was performed in UK prisons, and human trafficking, which led to the creation of the play 'Sold' which was performed for an international human trafficking conference. TVO also engages in long-term projects such as the one with the Kyangwali Refugee Camp in Uganda. This has led to the setting up of a sister organisation the New Hope Theatre Group.

== Plays ==
Many of the projects undertaken by Theatre Versus Oppression result in a play, often written by Jennifer S. Hartley and in collaboration with the groups she is working with. A selection of these plays can be found below.

== Published works ==
- Cabezas Dislocadas. Amazon: Kindle edition, 2004.
- The Art of Silence. Arandurã Editorial & Amazon: Kindle edition, 2005.
- The Sin Eater. Arandurã Editorial & Amazon: Kindle edition, 2006.
- 'Til Death do us Part. Amazon: Kindle edition, 2010.
- Sold. Amazon: Kindle edition, 2012.
