= Wan Smolbag Theatre =

- Founded: 1989
- Type: Community Theatre and Development Organisation
- Purpose: Awareness, engagement and education in issues of health, governance, gender and politics
- Location: Port Vila, Vanuatu
- Region served: South Pacific
- Employees: approx. 150
- Volunteers: approx. 400
- Website: www.wansmolbag.org

Wan Smolbag Theatre (Bislama for "one small bag") is a non-government organisation based in Vanuatu, and operating all over the South Pacific. It is primarily a development theatre group aiming to create awareness and engagement with issues surrounding education, health, governance, the environment, youth and gender.

Wan Smolbag has expanded from a voluntary theatre group to include a reproductive health clinic, a youth centre, a conservation network and a sports centre. It is core funded by Oxfam, Australian Aid and the New Zealand Agency for International Development. It produces materials such as a television show, DVDs, booklets and posters for education and training in communities, NGOs, schools and government departments throughout the South Pacific and the world.

Wan Smolbag has over 140 full-time and part-time staff: actors, director, scriptwriter, finance and administrative staff, graphic artists, nurses, peer educators, youth workers, film and radio technicians, and managers. It is based at converted warehouses in Tagabe, Port Vila, and also has a youth centre on the island of Pentecost, and a reproductive health clinic and youth centre in Luganville, Santo. it has two associate theatre groups on the outer islands: Haulua Theatre based on Pentecost and Wuhuran Theatre based on Ambrym. It also has a network of over 400 volunteer turtle conservation monitors (Vanua-tai monitors) based on islands throughout Vanuatu.

== History ==
Wan Smolbag Theatre was established in Port Vila, Vanuatu in 1989. It began as an amateur theatre group with 15 voluntary actors. Since that time WSB has established a national and regional reputation as a development theatre organisation that produces and delivers locally produced, high-quality film, radio and theatre productions that are complemented by a range of workshop and printed materials. Coupled with structured workshops facilitated by actors, the organisation uses drama to inform, raise awareness and encourage public discussion on a range of contemporary health, lifestyle, environment and governance issues.

The use of development theatre has led WSB into other areas such as reproductive health clinic, youth centres, and a rural-based conservation network. In 1997, WSB spent six months working closely with the Blacksands/Tagabe peri-urban settlement community, which has high levels of unemployment and illiteracy. During that time, a community play was developed, and research was conducted into many issues affecting the contemporary daily lives of community members. As result of that collaboration, WSB initiated a new reproductive health clinic (Kam Pusum Hed or KPH) at its base in Port Vila. KPH has gone on to be a model for the region of a confidential, youth-friendly reproductive health service. They have also duplicated the KPH model in Santo, with the Northern Youth Care Clinic.

In December 2002, WSB was awarded the Pacific People of the Year accolade by Islands Business magazine.

WSB had over 140 full-time and part-time staff: actors, director, scriptwriter, finance and administrative staff, graphic artists, nurses, peer educators, youth workers, film and radio technicians, and managers. WSB has its base at converted warehouses in Tagabe, Port Vila, but also has a youth centre on the island of Pentecost, and a reproductive health clinic and youth centre in Luganville, Santo. WSB has two associate theatre groups on the outer islands; Haulua Theatre based on Pentecost and Wuhuran Theatre based on Ambrym. WSB also has a network of over 400 volunteer turtle conservation monitors (Vanua-tai monitors) based on islands throughout Vanuatu.

In July 2009, WSB celebrated its 20th year of existence with performances of a new play called 40 Dei (40 days), and by inviting several overseas acts to come and participate in a 20th Anniversary Festival in Port Vila. Overseas performers included Polytoxic Dance Company from Brisbane, Nuffield Theatre from Southampton, UK, Kurruru Theatre, Diat Alferink and Steve Noonan all from Adelaide, Cie Les Kidams from Nouméa, Seini F. Taumoepeau from Sydney and New Zealand's Te Rakau.

== Productions ==
Coupled with structured workshops facilitated by actors, Wan Smolbag Theatre organisation uses drama to inform, raise awareness and encourage public discussion on a range of contemporary health, lifestyle, environment, and governance issues.

Wan Smolbag Theatre also produced Love Patrol, Vanuatu's first locally produced television show. Love Patrol was a police drama that seeks to engage the public on the causes and impacts of the spread of HIV in the region, as well as a number of other social and political issues. It was produced with funding with from Australian Aid and accompanied by resource books and lesson plans for use in classrooms and workshops.

To provide a means to tell the stories of disabled people in Vanuatu, Wan Smolbag formed the Rainbow Disability Theatre, which also acts as a support and solidarity group for the actors within it.

Wan Smolbag's health programme is also supported by the Healthforce theatre group, which engages communities throughout Vanuatu on issues of health, wealth management, nutrition, sanitation and waste management.

== Services ==
=== KPH clinic ===
Wan Smolbag Theatre's health programme also includes several reproductive health clinics in Port Vila and Luganville and nurses make monthly trips to the island of Pentecost to run a clinic at the Wan Smolbag youth centre there. The clinics offer counselling, family planning, STI counselling and treatment, Voluntary Confidential Counselling and Testing (VCCT), condoms, peer education, outreach programmes and a mobile clinic.

=== Youth centre ===
Wan Smolbag Theatre runs two urban youth centres and one rural youth centre in Port Vila, Luganville and the island of Pentecost. The youth centres are aimed at the large number of unemployed and out of school youth throughout Vanuatu. They provide informal classes, workshops, and activities e.g. hip hop, nutrition, music, sewing, agriculture, and sport.

=== Sports centre ===
Since 2005, Wan Smolbag has offered youth the opportunity to learn and participate in sports, such as futsal, hockey, basketball, and volleyball. The teams have entered a number of international tournaments and a number of youth have gone abroad for training and competitions.

=== Nutrition centre ===
At the main location in Vila, Wan Smolbag offers cooking and nutrition classes to local youth and provides workshops for schools, women at the market, and cooks. Some workshops are partnered with the Ministry of Health. The centre also provides a nutritious lunch for all staff, youth, and the wider community.

=== Environment ===
Wan Smolbag's environment programme focuses on encouraging and supporting community responsibility for the sustainable use of their resources. The programme has dealt with the issues of sustainable tourism, sea cucumber farming and turtle conservation via education programmes, plays, publications and the creation of the Vanua-Tai conservation network. Vanua-Tai monitors and protects populations of hawksbill turtles throughout Vanuatu.
