= Pan Intercultural Arts =

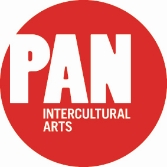
Pan's Logo

Pan is an intercultural arts organization and registered charity based in London, UK, that uses the arts to explore cultural diversity and social change. The main purpose of the organization is to help marginalised young people from all cultures and religions who are at risk of social exclusion to improve personal and interpersonal skills through a range of arts activities including drama, music, film, dance, creative writing and visual arts.

Pan's aims include: encouraging understanding, respect and social harmony between communities; giving a voice to marginalised youth and providing the opportunity to rehearse alternatives to their negative futures; and offering skills development and training/employment opportunities.

In addition to their work in London, Pan has worked internationally using the arts to address difficult issues including gender discrimination, child marriages and dowries. The organisation has also engaged with people affected by trauma including survivors of Cyclone Nargis in Myanmar and the Tsunami in Sri Lanka.

Pan's methodology is influenced by Brazilian dramatist Augusto Boal and forum theatre. In a forum performance, an audience member becomes a spect-actor when they take over the role of a character on stage in order to offer an alternative direction to the action on stage, thereby rehearsing change.

== Programmes ==
=== Refugee Arts Programme ===
The Amies Project supports victims of human trafficking and encourages reflection through music and drama. Participants develop physical and vocal confidence while roleplaying situations where they feel they lack confidence, working together to create a performance.

Fortune and Future groups provide young refugees and asylum seekers opportunities for confidence and creativity development through drama and movement activities focused on teamwork. Both groups have participated in public performances including Refugee Week 2010 at the Victoria and Albert Museum. Young refugees and asylum seekers are referred to PAN by organisations like The Helen Bamber Foundation, Refugee Council, Freedom from Torture, The Poppy Project, The Medaille Trust, Barnardo's and ECPAT.

=== Arts Against Violence Programme ===
Weapon of Choice uses peer-led debate and forum theatre to engage young people from backgrounds of gang culture and gun and knife crime. The project visits youth centres, schools and pupil referral units and presents real life scenarios encountered by London youth, encouraging audience participation to discover an alternative future for the characters on stage. Weapon of Choice have also performed their plays at Roundhouse and Old Bailey. Since 2009, Weapon of Choice has been funded by The Big Lottery Fund, Trusthouse Charitable Foundation, St. Andrew Holborn Charity, sir Jules Thorn Charitable Trust, Unite Foundation and The Deutsche Bank's youth engagement programme.

==== Other projects ====
The project “There Ain’t no Black in the Union Jack”, run from 2007 to 2008, provided residencies for over 100 young people across London. Participants created innovative and though provoking pieces of work which investigated “britishness”, citizenship and what it means to be “youth” in the 21st century in the UK. These were performed at a four-day showcase at the Hackney Empire.

Alongside the main programme of work, Pan works on a peer mentoring and youth leadership strand. In the Weapon of Choice programme, for example, previous participants are trained to become facilitators and to take the responsibility of leading their own project.

=== Integrated Arts Programme ===
Synergy Project was launched in 2010 to support the local community in Camden and it was funded by Emanuel Vincent Harris Trust and the Santander Foundation. It used drama, film, urban music, dance and graffiti art to connect with Camden youth at risk of crime and anti-social behaviour. In partnership with Camden-based youth organisations, the project aims to provide personal, social and creative development as well as transferable skills for future employment to young offenders, refugees and asylum seekers.

=== International Theatre for Development Programme ===
Pan uses theatre for development techniques to engage with communities in India, Sri Lanka, Pakistan, Myanmar and South Sudan, with the aim of addressing social injustice, human rights violations and trauma caused by conflict or natural disasters:

− India: in 2000 Pan established Vidya, a theatre group based in the slum communities of Ahmedabad that uses interactive theatre to open debates around the issues that prevent slum-dwelling girls from achieving their potentials. The performers are all from the slum areas and create plays from their own personal experiences. From 2003 Vidya has been self-sustaining and self funding.

− Sri Lanka: in 2005 Pan artists worked with the British Council to train actors, youth workers and clinicians to provide psycho-social help through art in the emergency camps set up across the country, following the Indian Ocean tsunami where high levels of post traumatic stress disorder were present. Follow up visits introduced Forum Theatre techniques to resettle communities where collapse of social infrastructure resulted in social problems. In 2009 Pan worked with the British Council and the Batticoloa Centre of Performing Arts to create Shakthi, a company composed by Tamil and Singhalese members who have been affected by the Sri Lankan civil war; in September 2010 the Shakthi group travelled to Switzerland to perform at the British Council Switzerland conference “Act 2: The Power of Theatre Post Conflict”, and continued to London for performances.

− Myanmar (Burma): in 2008 Pan collaborated with the British Embassy to train local NGOs to deal with the psycho-social problems which followed Cyclone Nargis, when 130,000 died in one night; in 2009 the United Nations Development Programme (UNDP) invited Pan to train 60 villagers from the affected Delta area to become travelling theatre companies that worked in 160 villages. In 2011 the British Council invited Pan to help establish a permanent Theatre for Development company, Human Drama, in collaboration with the NGO Association François-Xavier Bagnoud (AFXB). After three annual training periods Human Drama is now working with communities affected by sexual and reproductive health issues, human trafficking and access to justice.

− Pakistan: in 2013, in partnership with the British Council, and after two training periods with participants from Pakistani NGOs, Pan awarded 3 implementation grants to organisations to tackle a social issue using techniques of theatre for development in their communities. The organisations are all based in and around Peshawar and are therefore affected by the ongoing conflict situations near the Afghan border. One of the organisations is called Ranra, a word that means “light”. It focuses on human rights and on empowering women in their workplace to challenge sexual harassment.

− South Sudan: in 2015 Pan's artistic director and founder John Martin delivered workshops to the artists of the South Sudan Theatre Organisation (SSTO); the aim was to train the team as trainers for school projects to be held across the country which have begun a debate about the country's future amongst young people.

Pan's working model involves project workers training local actor/activists in the first stages of performance and interactions, after which the ownership passes to local groups or organisations who know their situations best. They in turn create interactive performances and train more people to disseminate the techniques and Pan can be a “long distance mentor”. These self-sustaining projects ensure the work can continue after Pan has left.
