= Jennifer S Hartley =

Jennifer S Hartley is a Scottish fiction author, applied theatre practitioner and director. She is the author of the novel The Shadow Whisperer published 2020 to critical acclaim, Applied Theatre in Action: a Journey, as well as various plays, poetry, and other writings.

== Early life and education ==
Hartley was born in Glasgow, Scotland, to Scottish parents who were both teachers. After completing a degree in English Literature and Linguistics at Strathclyde University in Glasgow, she went on to study direction and acting, where she specialised in applied theatre practices. Hartley received a doctorate from Queen Margaret University in Edinburgh where she addressed the effects of oppression on creativity. However her great passion has always rested in writing novels.

== Career ==
After a number of directing theatre ventures in the UK and abroad, Hartley’s work focused on South America, where she produced and directed theatre in both Spanish and English. At this time, Hartley was also teaching and lecturing on both drama theory and practice. Her work focused on therapy through theatre, working with theories and methodology related to Augusto Boal's Theatre of the Oppressed. Through their study and application, Hartley developed her own working practice, one that she now uses to work with minority and oppressed groups (in addition to their respective oppressors) internationally.

This, in turn, has led to a number of studies, publications and works by Hartley including plays, academic articles, and poetry. Hartley's plays include The Art of Silence (2005), The Sin Eater (2006), and 'Til Death do us Part (2010). The Art of Silence was performed in over eight countries and in three different languages, including performances at the Edinburgh Fringe Festival in 2006. Hartley regularly works on various theatre projects, both community and therapy-based, from which new writing is also being developed.

In 2010, Hartley gave a talk at the TEDx conference in Bangkok entitled The Truth in the Lie. This talk addressed the idea of personal truths as perceived by individuals, and hence the ultimately subjective nature of truth itself.

== Other activities ==
Hartley is the founder and director of the UK registered charity Theatre Versus Oppression (TVO). She has run projects around the world with TVO including work in Uganda, Zimbabwe, South Africa, Kenya, Tanzania, Thailand, Paraguay, Uruguay, Brazil, Argentina, Chile, the USA and the UK. Hartley is regularly developing new projects in the UK and abroad, working in conjunction with various other non-profit organisations and educational establishments. She is also the co-director and co-founder of the media company Multi Story Media Limited.

== Published works ==
=== Plays ===
- The Shadow Whisperer, 2020
- The Collection Applied Theatre Edition with Exercises, 2019
- The Collection (a collection of 4 plays); 2014
- Sold: Kindle edition, 2013.
- 'Til Death do us Part. Amazon: Kindle edition, 2010.
- The Sin Eater. Arandurã Editorial & Amazon: Kindle edition, 2006.
- The Art of Silence. Arandurã Editorial & Amazon: Kindle edition, 2005.
- Cabezas Dislocadas. Amazon: Kindle edition, 2004.

=== Fiction ===
- The Shadow Whisperer.under a minute. ISBN 979-8697771334

=== Non-fiction ===
- Applied Theatre in Action: a Journey. UK: Trentham, 2012. ISBN 1858564964.
- La Opresion Como un Estimulo para el cambio. Paraguay: Arandurã Editorial, 2005.

=== Poetry ===
- A Puppet without Strings. Paraguay: Arandurã Editorial, 2005.
