= Community theatre =

Community-based theatrical performance

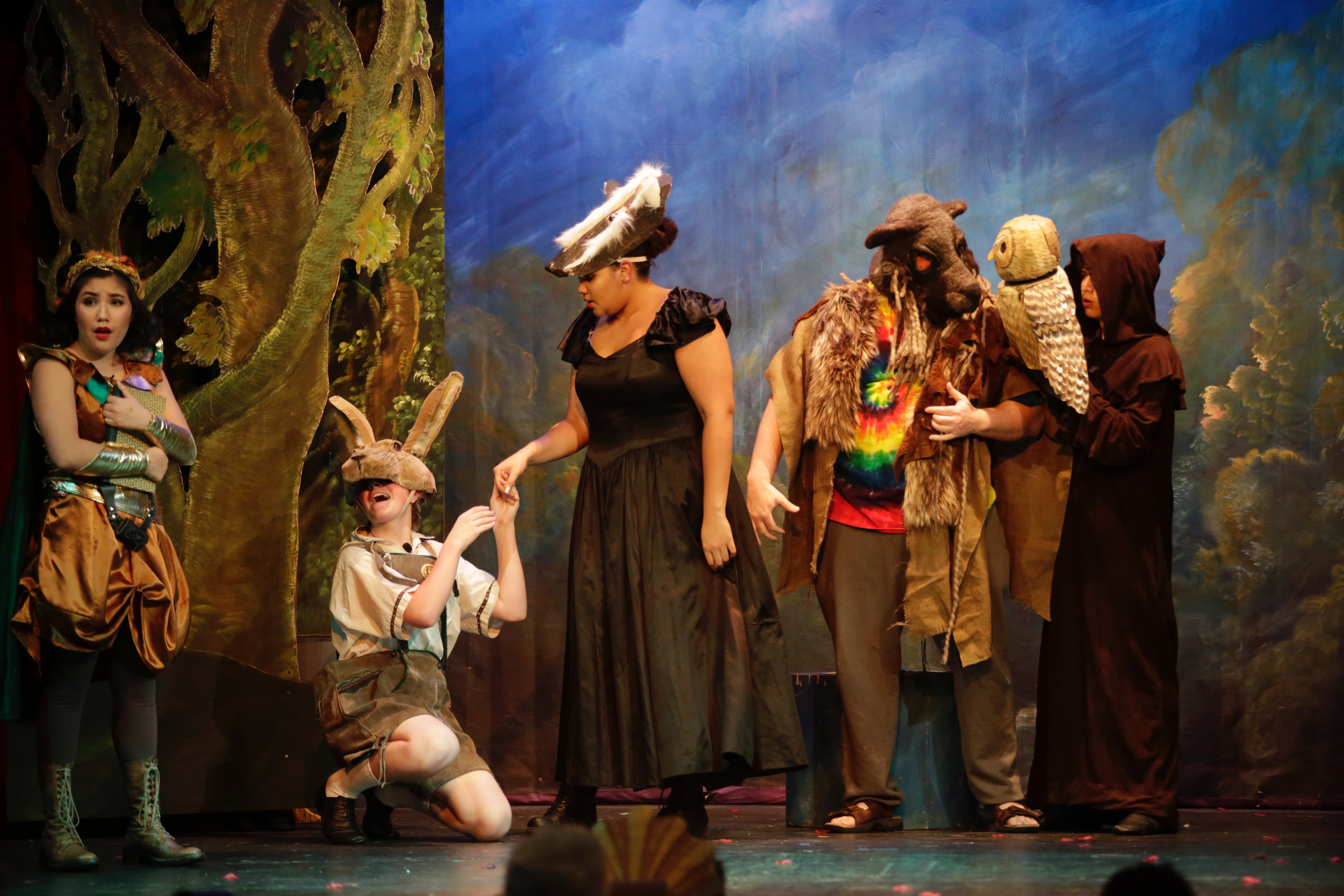
Amateur actors performing a scene from Snow White, a musical comedy

Community theatre is theatrical performance made in relation to particular communities—its usage includes theatre made by, with, or for a community. It may refer to a production that is made entirely by a community with no outside help, or a collaboration between community members and professional theatre artists, or a performance made entirely by professionals that is addressed to a particular community.

Community theatres range in size from small groups led by single individuals that perform in borrowed spaces to large permanent companies with well-equipped facilities of their own. Many community theatres are successful, non-profit businesses with a large active membership and, often, a full-time staff. Community theatre is often devised and may draw on popular theatrical forms, such as carnival, circus, and parades, as well as performance modes from commercial theatre. This type of theatre is ever-changing and evolving due to the influences of the community; the artistic process can often be heavily affected by the community's socioeconomic circumstances.

There is a certain obligation that community theatre is held to because of the personal and physical connection to its own community and the people within that community. Community theatre is understood to contribute to the social capital of a community, insofar as it develops the skills, community spirit, and artistic sensibilities of those who participate, whether as producers or audience members. It is used as a tool for social development, promoting ideas like gender equality, human rights, environment, and democracy. Participants might identify issues and discuss possible solutions. Such plays can be performed in traditional playhouses but also can be staged in public places, traditional meeting spaces, schools, prisons, or other institutions, inviting an often spontaneous audience to watch.

== Latin America ==
Partly inspired by Antonio Gramsci's interpretation of culture, the seminal theatre practitioner Augusto Boal developed a series of techniques known as the Theatre of the Oppressed from his work developing community theatre in Latin America.

== United Kingdom ==
In Britain the term "community theatre" is sometimes used to describe theatre made by professional theatre artists with or for particular communities, notable practitioners include Joan Littlewood and her Theatre Workshop, John McGrath and Elizabeth MacLennan and their 7:84 company, Welfare State International, and Ann Jellicoe founder of the Colway Theatre Trust, now known as the Claque Theatre and run by UK practitioner Jon Oram.

The term can refer to that made entirely by non-professionals, which is usually known as "amateur theatre", "amateur dramatics." or "amdram"

Additionally it can cover venues that are run-by (and usually owned) by volunteers with the main organisation representing these being the Little Theatre Guild of Great Britain

== Netherlands ==
Community theatre in the Netherlands came about either from professional radical people's theatre companies, or as an outgrowth of the theatre in education movement. The big theatre in the Netherlands which was created originally for theatre in education and subsequently community theatre, is the Stut Theatre. This theatre idea began in 1977 by Jos Bours and Marlies Hautvast, who when they first started creating plays at the Stut Theatre, realized this kind of community theatre had a completely different approach from theatre in education.

== United States ==
Community theatre in the United States was an outgrowth of the Little Theatre Movement, a reform movement which began in 1912 in reaction to massive Victorian melodramatic theatre spectacles. The country's oldest extant community theatre venue, Gates Hall in Pultneyville, New York, has existed since the 19th century and presented amateur performances every year since 1867.

The American Association of Community Theatre represents community theatres in the U.S., its territories, and theatre companies with the overseas U.S. military services.

== Canada ==
Canada has an extensive network of amateur theatre groups known as community players, and many belong to provincial associations, as in Ontario, where many companies are members of the Association of Canadian Theatres (ACT-CO).

The alternative theatre movement, which had a nationalist focus when it emerged in Canada in the late 1960s and early 1970s, produced a number of professional companies that focused on local communities and histories. Theatre Passe Muraille sent ensemble casts into rural communities to record local stories, songs, accents, and lifestyle. Their employment of collective creation served as an inspiration and spread across Canada. Passe Muraille facilitated the first production of Codco, which employed personal experiences of Newfoundland culture in their shows.

The 1980s witnessed an unprecedented rise in “Popular Theatre” companies, such as Headlines Theatre (Vancouver), Company of Sirens (Toronto), and the Popular Theatre Alliance of Manitoba (Winnipeg), which utilized political theatre practices such agitprop, guerilla theatre, Brecht’s epic theatre techniques, and Augusto Boal’s Theatre of the Oppressed to take theatre to the people and create productions by and for specific communities.

Second-generation theatre companies, such as Mixed Theatre Company in Toronto and Stage Left Productions in Canmore, Alberta, continue this practice today. Stage Left uses Brechtian and Forum Theatre techniques to address social and political issues through theatre. The company also works to promote equality and diversity, support artists and community groups, and create theatre that raises awareness about political and social issue.

== Australia and New Zealand ==
In Western Australia, there are a substantial number of community theatre groups who have banded together to form the Independent Theatre Association.

The South Canterbury Drama League is a community theatre based in Timaru, New Zealand.

== Churches ==
Ecclesiastical communities often encourage theatrical productions, be they for youth or adults. The Christmas Play is a tenet of modern church theatre. In addition to performing in the church itself, many parishes have halls for performances. In the nineteenth century, Christians in European and North American often performed plays in church halls or other rented spaces, often using the proceeds from donations and tickets for charity.

Some community theatre communities incorporate religious themes into their theatrical productions, producing original works based on biblical narratives or moral teachings instead of the direct incorporation within services. For example, in southern California, a judeo-christian community theater, Lifehouse Theater Productions, specializes in producing and distributing faith-based theatrical productions internationally.

== Communism ==
Soviet initiatives like the Petrograd Politprosvet and Central Agitational Studio performed improvisational theatre in the 1920s as a pedagogical project to tell stories about Marxist concepts. In 1923, the Twelfth Communist Party Congress voted to support their work for the improvement of proletarian life. The performers rejected traditional forms of theatre and called themselves activists instead.

== See also ==
- Community art
- Forum theatre
- Interactive theatre
- Participatory theatre
- Theatre for development
- Theatre of Western Springs

== Sources ==
- Banham, Martin, ed. (1995). The Cambridge Guide to Theatre. Cambridge: Cambridge University Press. ISBN 0-5214-3437-8.
- Boal, Augusto (2008). Theatre of the Oppressed. London: Pluto. ISBN 978-0-7453-2838-6.
- Brady, David; McCormick, John (1978). People's Theatre. UK: Croom Helm. ISBN 978-0-8476-6073-5.
- Charlebois, Gaetan (2021). "Codco". Canadian Theatre Encyclopedia.
- Charlebois, Gaetan (2022). "Theatre Passe Muraille". Canadian Theatre Encyclopedia.
- Coult, Tony; Kershaw, Baz (1983). Engineers of the Imagination: The Welfare State Handbook. London: Methuen. ISBN 0-4135-2800-6.
- Gooch, Steve (1984). All Together Now: An Alternative View of Theatre and the Community. Methuen theatrefile. London: Methuen. ISBN 0-4135-3480-4.
- Heddon, Deirdre; Milling, Jane (2005). Devising Performance: A Critical History. Theatre & Performance Practices. London: Palgrave Macmillan. ISBN 1-4039-0662-9.
- Kershaw, Baz (1992). The Politics of Performance: Radical Theatre as Cultural Intervention. London and New York: Routledge. ISBN 0-4150-5763-9.
- MacLennan, Elizabeth (1990). The Moon Belongs to Everyone: Making Theatre with 7:84. London: Methuen. ISBN 0-4136-4150-3.
- Mally, Lynn (2000). Revolutionary Acts : Amateur Theater and the Soviet State, 1917-1938. Ithaca, New York: Cornell University Press. ISBN 0-8014-3769-5. OCLC 4395388.
- McGrath, John (1981). A Good Night Out: Popular Theatre: Audience, Class and Form. London: Nick Hern Books. ISBN 1-8545-9370-6.
- McGrath, John (1990). The Bone Won't Break: On Theatre and Hope in Hard Times. London: Methuen. ISBN 0-4136-3260-1.
- Naylor, David; Dillon, Joan (1997). American Theaters: Performance Halls of the Nineteenth Century. New York Weinheim: Wiley & Sons. ISBN 978-0-4711-4393-2.
- Schachenmayr, Alkuin (2023). "How a Polish countess became a Catholic Harriet Beecher Stowe". Catholic World Report.
- Scharinger, J. (2013). "Participatory theater, is it really? A critical examination of practices in Timor-Leste" (PDF). ASEAS - Austrian Journal of South-East Asian Studies. 6 (1): 102–119. Archived from the original (PDF) on 2016-03-03.
- Schechter, Joel (2002). Popular Theatre: A Sourcebook. Worlds of Performance. London and New York: Routledge. ISBN 0-4152-5830-8.
- Van Erven, Eugene (2001). Community Theatre: Global Perspectives. New York: Routledge. ISBN 0-4151-9031-2.
