= Wilmington Drama League =

Coordinates: 39.761808°N 75.521151°W

The Wilmington Drama League is a community theater group in Wilmington, Delaware in the United States that produces performing arts and owns its own theater. The theater is located at 10 West Lea Blvd. in North Wilmington, Delaware.

In the community theater productions the actors are not paid, although the band for a musical might be.

== History ==
The Wilmington Drama League's long and noble performing arts tradition traces back to 1933, when a small band of enthusiasts began staging plays on the third floor of an old grist mall at 18th and Market Streets. Seven years later, the success of this venture in community theater enabled the Drama League to relocate to its own facility on West Lea Boulevard.

Since then the play, most assuredly, has been the thing at WDL. In all its years of operation, the Drama League has mounted innumerable adult and children's theatrical productions. The talents and energies of thousands of volunteers - actors, directors, set designers and builders, lighting and sound engineers, as well as costume, makeup, and prop technicians - have transformed our stage into the compelling fantasy worlds created by playwrights ranging from Edward Albee, Beckett and Chekhov to David Mamet and Arthur Miller, Simon and Shakespeare, Oscar Wilde and Williams.

== Today ==
Today, the Wilmington Drama League does many diverse and fun activities. It performs an annual Battle of the Bands, providing opportunity to local musicians. Pillow Plays, small scale performances by youth for youth, ensure that theater will live on into the 21st century.
