= Tacoma Little Theatre =

Tacoma Little Theatre is a community theatre organization in Tacoma, Washington. Founded in 1918, it is based in Tacoma's Stadium District and has operated from its current theatre building since 1940.

== History ==
Tacoma Little Theatre was founded in October 1918 as the Tacoma Center of the Drama League of America. It was later known as the Tacoma Drama League, and in 1937 was incorporated under the name Tacoma Little Theatre and Drama League. From 1918 to 1940, the organization presented productions at several Tacoma venues, including Annie Wright Seminary, First Congregational Church, Stadium High School, and Slavonian Hall.

In 1939, the company purchased and remodeled a former automobile repair shop in Tacoma's Stadium District, which remains the theatre's home. A 2018 centennial article in Showcase Magazine described Tacoma Little Theatre as a long-running part of the local community. In 2021, Tacoma Little Theatre was honored with the Diamond Crown Organizational Award by the American Association of Community Theatre.

== Productions and activities ==
Tacoma Little Theatre presents theatrical productions and educational programs. In 2019, its production of The Pillowman by Martin McDonagh was selected for national competition. In 2020, during the COVID-19 pandemic, The News Tribune reported that the theatre shifted its summer camps to online classes for students.
