= Cardboard Citizens =

British theatre company for the homeless

Cardboard Citizens is the UK's only homeless people's professional theatre company, and the leading practitioner of Forum Theatre and the Theatre of the Oppressed methodology in the UK.

== History and productions ==
Cardboard Citizens was founded in 1991 by Adrian Jackson, MBE, in the Cardboard City that had sprung up in what was then called the Bullring in Waterloo.

Cardboard Citizens became independent in 1995 and now regularly tours Forum Theatre productions written by playwrights including Kae Tempest (Glasshouse), Ali Taylor (Cathy) and Sarah Woods (Meta) in the UK to theatres, prisons, hostels and community venues. It has also mounted theatre productions in both site-specific locations and as collaborations with other larger organisations, including the Royal Shakespeare Company (RSC) and English National Opera. These have included Mincemeat, A Few Man Fridays, Pericles and Timon of Athens (both RSC). In 2016, the company staged a Community Ensemble theatrical staging of Ken Loach's Cathy Come Home to mark the film's 50th anniversary and the Theatre Company's 25th anniversary. The production starred Elle Payne as Cathy and Denholm Spurr as Reg.

In December 2017, Cardboard Citizens' founder, CEO and Artistic Director Adrian Jackson was awarded an MBE for Services to the Arts in the 2018 New Year Honours list.

== 2021–Present ==
In August 2021, Chris Sonnex - the former Artistic Director of the Bunker Theatre in Southwark – was appointed as Cardboard Citizens’ Artistic Director, becoming the first person with lived experience of poverty and homelessness to lead the organization.

== See also ==
- Theatre of the Oppressed
- Augusto Boal
