= Educational television =

Television programs developed for use in education

Educational television or learning television is the use of television programs in the field of distance education. It may be in the form of individual television programs or dedicated specialty channels that are often associated with cable television in the United States as Public, educational, and government access (PEG) channel providers. There are also adult education programs for an older audience; many of these are instructional television or "telecourse" services that can be taken for college credit, such as the Open University programs on BBC television in the UK.

Many children's television series are educational, ranging from dedicated learning programs to those that indirectly teach the viewers. Some series are written to have a specific moral behind every episode, often explained at the end by the character that learned the lesson.

In the social aspects of television, several studies have found that educational television has many advantages. The Media Awareness Network explains in its article "The Good Things about Television" that television can be a very powerful and effective learning tool for children if used wisely. The article states that television can help kids or teens discover where they fit into society, develop closer relationships with peers and family, and teach them to understand complex social aspects of communication.

Mexican TV producer Miguel Sabido pioneered in the 1970s the use of telenovela to disseminate the government's policy views to mass audiences. The "Sabido Method" has been adopted by a number of countries, including India, Kenya, Peru, and China.

== Examples ==
- Public Broadcasting Service (PBS)
- Annenberg Foundation (The Annenberg Channel)
- NASA TV
- TVOntario
- China Education Television (CETV)
- Knowledge Channel
- NHK Educational TV

The television medium can and has been used for a multitude of educational purposes. Some television programs are explicitly educational, while others only incidentally so. Some formats blend the two in the attempt to amuse but also retain some educational value.

== TV reforms for education-based programs ==
The time of "TV vs. radio", the early 1960s, were an era of change. Historian Michael Curtin recounted that then-FCC chair Jon Doerfor, and TV network heads, had come to an agreement that most television programming was based on commercialism and emphasized entertainment too much. To help counterbalance this, there was a plan organized to produce more serious news and documentary programs. This policy was placed just in time for networks to expand their news coverage on the Kennedy-Nixon campaigns and debates. This increase in coverage stirred up the polls as those who saw the debates, with Kennedy's good looks and camera confidence, decided he had won, whereas those who listened were more impressed with Nixon.

By 1962, TV reform was in full swing, and 400 prime-time documentaries had been produced, as opposed to a total of zero back in 1957. Curtin noted that news programs were extended to full half-hour segments, and foreign and domestic issues were receiving heightened degrees of attention.

== Edutainment and telenovelas ==
Some television programs are designed with primarily educational purposes in mind, although they might rely heavily on entertainment to communicate their educational messages. In children's programming, edutainment becomes fun and interesting for the child but can still be educational.

Other television programs are designed to raise social awareness. One form of edutainment popular in Latin America is the educational telenovela. Miguel Sabido, a producer of telenovelas from the 1970s on, has combined communication theory with pro-health/education messages to educate audiences throughout Latin America about family planning, literacy, and other topics. He developed a model that incorporated the work of Albert Bandura and other theorists, as well as research to determine whether programs impacted audience behavior.

The first ever television series produced in the Pacific Island country of Vanuatu, entitled Love Patrol and launched in 2007, was praised as an edutainment series, as it aimed to educate viewers on the issue of AIDS, while simultaneously providing an entertaining story.

The Hulu Original TV series East Los High is backed by a health initiative to teach healthy sexual behaviors (e.g. using protection, getting checked for sexually transmitted diseases).

== Entertainment ==
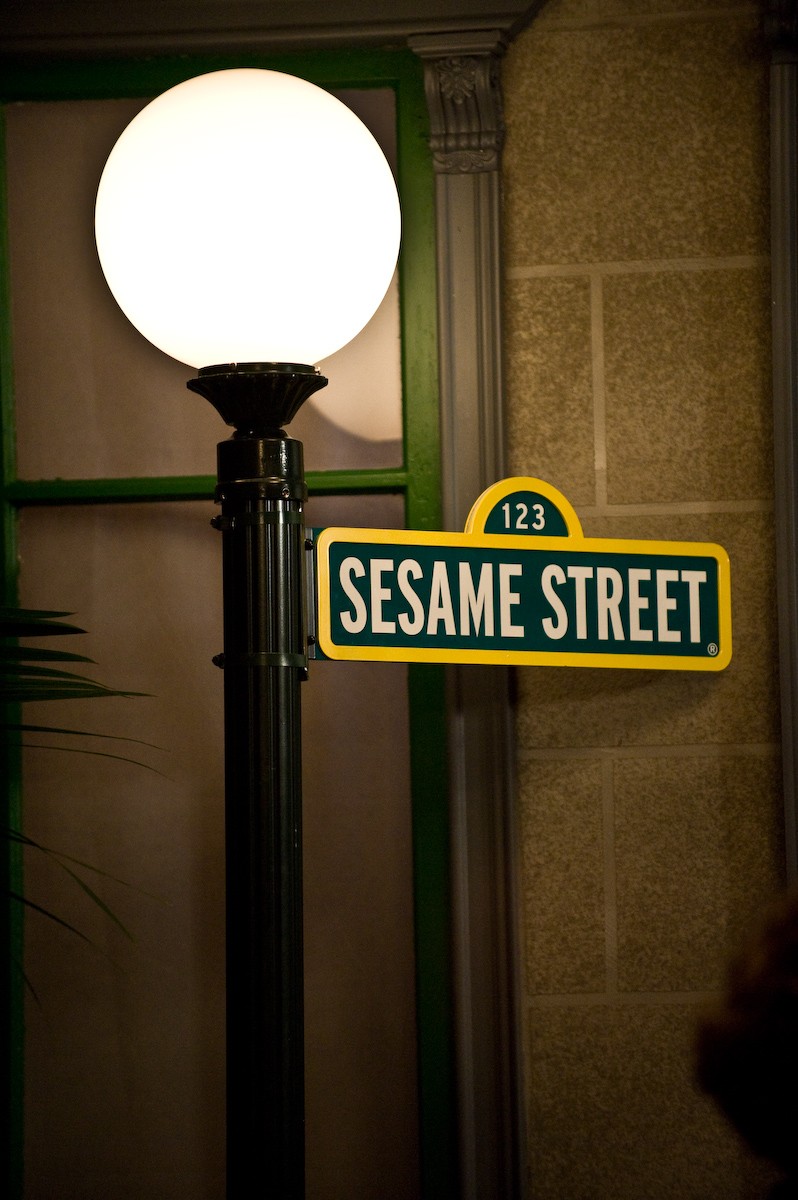
Symbol of the long running and internationally acclaimed educational children's show Sesame Street

Some television shows incorporate a considerable degree of historical or factual information while attempting to make the presentation or framing of such content entertaining or exciting. By making learning seem "exciting" they can be said to stimulate curiosity, taking Elinor Wonders Why as an example. The presence of edutainment is especially evident in children's television series, such as Sesame Street, Teletubbies, and Barney and Friends. Discovery Channel is also known for its various shows that follow that theme, including MythBusters. Sometimes these programs may be more entertaining than educational and may replace educational shows in the television program lineup. The History Channel has transitioned from producing primarily factual and historical documentaries to more sensational, dramatic, and supposedly entertaining programs, with educational content a secondary concern.

Television series notable for negative reception, from around the world, either by published critics, by network executives or by audience response, can be judged based on poor quality, the lack of a budget, rapid cancellation, very low viewership, offensive content, and/or negative impact on other series on the same channel. In some cases, a show that is acceptable on its own merits can be put in a position where it does not belong and be judged "worst ever." In many cases, "worst television series ever" lists are slanted toward more contemporary shows, in recent memory.

The Children's Television Act of 1990, which was first fully enforced in 1996, requires broadcast television stations in the United States to carry a minimum of three hours of "educational/informational" programming geared directly at children. The move prompted an exodus of non-educational children's programming to cable television and largely failed in its efforts to expand the amount of educational television on the airwaves (in fact, children's television in general has declined significantly on broadcast television since the act was imposed, although it can be argued that the E/I regulations could very well be the only thing keeping children's television on broadcast airwaves in the 2010s).

== Incidental educational value ==
Some programs are primarily aimed at entertainment, but may contain an incidental amount of educational content. Educational content may be inherent to the design of the show, such as with medical dramas where the plot invariably explores anatomical and biological issues. The Sentinel Award, which is administered by the University of Southern California's Annenberg Center for Communication, the CDC and the National Cancer Institute (NCI), is given each year to programs that address health and medical issues in their storylines. 2006's nominees/winners included:

- Numb3rs - for a storyline about fighting crime using mathematics
- Grey's Anatomy - for story lines about organ transplantation and cancer
- As the World Turns - for a breast cancer storyline that involved a major character
- George Lopez - for a storyline about a kidney transplant
- Ben & Izzy - for a storyline about two children, Ben from America and Izzy from Jordan, who form a close bond despite their different cultural backgrounds

While some programs are typically "pure" entertainment, they may foray into educational content at select times. For older viewers, individual situation comedy episodes also occasionally serve as educational entertainment vehicles. These episodes are sometimes described in United States television commercial parlance as very special episodes. As early as the 1950s, children-aimed shows like Watch Mr. Wizard were made which could be considered edutainment.

On the other hand, some programs may seem for the lay public to contain educational content, but are actually completely fictional. It is up to experts to figure out if a specific TV program uses realistic or fictional plots. One example for only seemingly real programs are mockumentaries.

== See also ==
- Cable in the Classroom
- Continental Classroom
- Educational film
- Edutainment
- National Association of Educational Broadcasters
- Non-commercial educational (NCE)
- Sunrise Semester
- Children's television series
