= Applied Drama =

Umbrella term for theatrical practices

Applied drama (also known as applied theatre or applied performance) is an umbrella term for the use of theatrical practices and creativity that takes participants and audience members further than mainstream theatre. It is often in response to conventional people with real life stories. The work often happens in non-conventional theatre spaces and social settings (e.g. schools, prisons, streets and alternative educational provisions). There are several forms and practices considered to be under the umbrella of applied theatre.

== History ==
Applied drama is a term that has gained popularity towards the end of the 20th century to describe drama practice in an educational, community, or therapeutic context.

Applied drama can be either scripted or unscripted. Some practitioners focus primarily on improvisation, whereas others introduce a range of artistic practices such as developing scripted plays, devised performances, or indigenous forms of cultural performance. These are sometimes combined with new forms of digital communication.

== Fields associated with applied drama ==
=== Playback Theater ===
Playback Theater involves audience or group members telling stories from their lives and viewing them as enacted by actors improvising. It can also be used in conjunction with narrative therapy.

=== Drama in health education ===
Drama in healthcare is drama created in medical contexts, often with the intention of rehabilitation.

This form of applied drama focuses on using theatre to educate, engage, and stimulate healing in medical professionals, patients, and the general public. Theater and drama in healthcare are tilted towards informing the populace about health and improving their health and longevity irrespective of status or social stratification. This form of drama is often used to educate people on important health issues such as healthy eating, grief and loss, exercise, and sexual assault prevention. Examples include using actors to role-play health ailments in order to train healthcare professionals, performing plays focused on primary prevention, and facilitating drama workshops for patients.

=== Drama therapy ===
Drama therapy is the use of applied drama techniques to facilitate personal growth and promote mental health.

Drama therapy is rooted in a clinical practice. Facilitated by licensed clinicians that stimulate language, cognitive development, and that builds resilience.

=== Theater for Development ===
Theater for development uses applied drama techniques to facilitate development in less developed countries.

=== Drama in education ===
Drama in education allows students to develop an understanding of themselves and others. Kathleen Gallagher has argued that "What is clear is that there is no correct pedagogical model on offer for drama education. [...] In theatre pedagogy, we not only endow experience with meaning, but we are - as players - invited to make manifest our own subjectivities in the world evoked through character and play, a world laden with metaphor and nuance, a world where relationship to other and self-spectatorship are in dynamic and unrelenting interaction.'

=== Theater in education ===
Theater in Education (TIE) originated in Britain in the mid-1960s. Monica Prendergast and Juliana Saxton cite TIE as "one of the two historic roots of applied theatre practice." TIE typically includes a theatre company performing in an educational setting (i.e. a school) for youth, including interactive and performative moments. Practitioner Lynn Hoare defines TIE as a combination of "theatrical elements with interactive moments in which audience participants (in or out of role) work with actor-teachers towards an educational or social goal, using the tools of theatre in service of this goal." TIE seeks to educate young people in issues that are relevant to both them and their communities, for example: bullying, dating violence, environmental preservation, and peer conflict resolution. "TIE companies have always been among the most socially conscious of theatre groups, consistently choosing to examine issues they believe to be of direct relevance to the lives of the children with whom they work."

"Theater for Dialogue" (TFD) is a more recent term describing a model that was created specifically for the University of Texas at Austin campus community which pulls methods and theory from a variety of applied theatre practices such as TO and TIE. In her thesis, Spring Snyder explains that "Theatre for Dialogue performances explore the intersection between theatre and education as a way to investigate, reflect, provoke dialogue and serve as a rehearsal for reality without asking participants to share their own personal experiences. Although some of the Theatre for Dialogue's roots originate from an adapted form of Boal's Theatre of the Oppressed's forum structure, it is Theatre in Education (TIE) that more closely aligns with TFD."

=== Prison theater ===
In prison theater, practitioners engage offenders in correctional facilities, jails, prisons, and detention centers in exploring drama work often with the objective of education or rehabilitation.

Examples include Wabash Valley Correctional Facility's Shakespeare in Shackles where maximum security prisoners learn about and perform Shakespeare. The University of Texas' Center for Women and Gender Studies' Performing Justice Project works with incarcerated female youth to learn about gender and racial justice while devising a play based on the youth's unique experiences.

=== Theater of the Oppressed ===
The Theatre of the Oppressed (TO) describes theatrical forms that the Brazilian theatre practitioner Augusto Boal first developed in the 1960s, initially in Brazil and later in Europe. Boal's techniques aim to use theatre as means of promoting social and political change through allowing the audience to take an active role in the creation of the show. Theatre of the Oppressed can include aspects of forum theatre, invisible theatre, legislative theatre and image theatre.

=== Museum theatre ===
Museum theatre aims to use theatrical techniques to add emotion and value to the museum experience. It is typically more common in cultural institutions like heritage sites, history museums, and science and industry museums. As with the other forms of applied drama, it can involve a variety of theatrical techniques.

== See also ==
- Theatre pedagogy
- Improvisation
- William Shakespeare
