= CSAN =

CSAN may refer to:

- Caritas Social Action Network, a Catholic charity in England and Wales
- California Soccer Association North, a Californian adult association football organisation and member of USASA
- Cheval de Sport Anglo Normand, a studbook of the Anglo-Norman horse
