= Black light theatre =

Theatrical genre

Black light theatre (in Czech černé divadlo) or simply black theatre, is a theatrical performance style characterized by the use of black box theatre augmented by black light illusion. This form of theatre originated from Asia and can be found in many places around the world. It has become a speciality of Prague, where many theatres use it.

The distinctive characteristics of "black theatre" are the use of black curtains, a darkened stage, and "black lighting" (UV light), paired with fluorescent costumes in order to create intricate visual illusions. This "black cabinet" technique was used by Georges Méliès, and by theatre revolutionary Konstantin Stanislavski (especially in his production of Cain). The technique, paired with the expressive artistry of dance, mime and acrobatics of the performers is able to create remarkable spectacles.

== Optics ==
A key principle of black light theatre is the inability of the human eye to distinguish black objects from a black background. This effect results in effective invisibility for any objects not illuminated by the 'black light'. The second optical principle behind black light theatre is the effect of UV light on fluorescent objects. Black lights actually emit as much light as 'normal' lights, but at a frequency that humans cannot detect. While most objects either absorb UV light or reflect it back at the same frequency at which it came in, fluorescent objects absorb UV light then re-emit it at a longer wavelength that human eyes can detect. The combined effect is that designers can make some objects appear as bright as if the room were fully lighted, while making other objects appear as dark as if the room were completely dark.

== History ==
The black box trick of using performers dressed in black in a dark playing space has been in use for millennia, starting with the jugglers performing for the emperor in ancient China. Japan developed this technique in its Bunraku Theatre by having puppeteers wear black in order to place complete emphasis on the puppet. Under the stage name 'Black Art', an 1897 American compendium of stage illusion techniques included a detailed description of an illusion which displays key elements of modern Czech 'Black Light Theatre' apart from, crucially, the use of ultraviolet lighting on fluorescent materials. In this 19th-century procedure, the stage is draped in black velvet to suppress ambient light. Instead of UV lighting on fluorescent materials, those figures and objects which the audience is intended to see are in white. In an otherwise dark theatre, special low lights round the edges of the darkened stage serve to slightly dazzle the audience and thus hide black-clad stage assistants who make white objects suddenly appear by producing them from unseen black velvet bags. Likewise unseen black-clad stage assistants manipulate visible white objects, for instance skeletons, around the dark stage. This account names the legendary Harry Kellar as among stage magicians who had used this method.

In modern theatre, the black box trick was adopted by Russian director Konstantin Stanislavski, film director Georges Méliès, and various French avantgarde directors of the 1950s. Among these directors, George Lafaye became an earlier pioneer of black cabinet. But all these directors used the simple trick of black cabinet for only a few moments during their performances, mostly to make something on the stage disappear.

The father of modern black light theatre, author of the principle of black cabinet as is used nowadays (placement of spot lights, placement of UV lights, selection of black velvet as the best material to absorb residual light on the scene...) and even author of the name "black light theatre", and thus the creator of the first black light theatre in the world, is Jiří Srnec. The first performance of the ensemble took place in 1959 in Vienna. It became better known after its participation in the Theatre Festival in Edinburgh in 1962. Later, other groups using the technique of black box appeared starting the new wave of this theatre style.

Prague has since become the home of black light theatre with around 10 black light theatre companies.

Another well-known black light theatre group is HILT black light theatre Prague, whose performances are based on modern music and dance choreographies, also incorporating live singing. The group was founded in 2006 by Czech dancer, choreographer, director and music composer Theodor Hoidekr. In 2016, a new black light theatre style called "shadow film theatre" was created by the HILT Prague group. In addition to black light theatre shows, their performances also include the first shadow film theatre - dancers and actors play with their shadows on a screen with projections of real places.

In Germany Rainer Pawelke presented his interpretation of black theatre in a stage show for the first time in 1980. The stage show was developed together with his students from the University of Regensburg and was the precursor to the educational sports theatre project Traumfabrik. The project enjoyed considerable popularity in the 1980s - touring and appearing in prime time television in Germany. Traumfabrik tours still every year with 40 shows per year including black light theatre acts. Rainer Pawelke co-authored a book "Schwarzes Theater aus der Traumfabrik" (German: Black light theatre in the Traumfabrik" to share and consolidate his insights about black theatre.

== Modern dance in black light theatre ==
In 1989 the Image Theatre was founded by dancer Eva Asterová (former member of Pavel Smok's famous Czech ballet company) and Alexander Čihař. They brought new aspects into black light theatre effects such as modern dance and non-verbal acting. Under the hand of Eva Asterová, the theatre's artistic director, Image seeks to produce an individual look of at a scene's signature. The audience also often becomes an integral part of the performance. The repertory of the Image theatre is composed of its own devised works. Apart from Eva Asterová there are also other authors cooperating repeatedly on Image Theatre's performances such as Josef Tichý, Petr Liška, René Pyš or Zdeněk Zdeněk. Since the beginning, Image Theatre had presented 10 different performances and in each of them they came with some new black light technique effects. Magic poetics, playfulness, and humor are the most important trademarks of this ensemble.

The Image theatre has 22 years experience in Prague's black light theatres scene. Apart from regular performances in Prague, Image also performs internationally (Korea, Hong Kong, Macau, Israel, Turkey, India, Lebanon, Greece, Germany, France, Italy, Switzerland, Belgium, Hungary, Slovakia, Cyprus).

== Black light theatre today ==
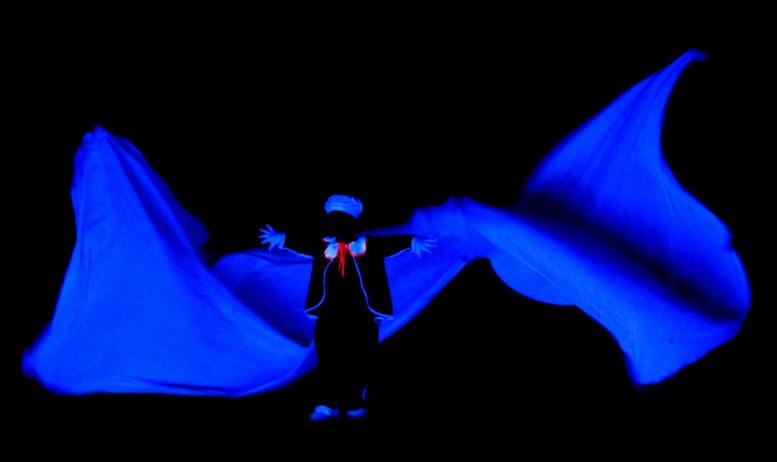
Only parts of this performer's body can be seen because of the special costume.

Nowadays there are many companies of black light theatre also out of Prague (Hungary, Ukraine, Germany, USA) trying to make shows similar to black light theatres in Prague. Prague scene has changed its face to the style of 20th century – modern dance was involved, costume designs have become more effective, black light theatre shows have become more musical. Prague is still home of black light theatre – hundreds thousands of tourists visit their shows every month.

HILT – the black light theatre of Theodor Hoidekr was the first ever who has involved live singing into black light show. The most popular HILT's black light theatre musical show was "Juliet's Dream" premiered on 14 February 2012 in Prague. HILT is working on new style of black light theatre – all the members are experienced in black light theatres all over Prague. Its founder and director Theodor Hoidekr was originally dancer who later started to work with black light theatre style. His experiences comes from Prague, Slovakia, Germany, Malta, Greece, South America, India

Since 8 April 2015 HILT performs the new show "Phantom" that is the world first black light theatre version of the mysterious phantom figure. The black light theatre HILT starts the new part of their history in theatre Royal Prague. In 2016 HILT has presented the first shadow film theatre Cinderella.

In 2017 HILT has moved to the Prague popular U Valšů Theatre in the centre of the Old Prague. 2.6.2017 they start to present also their best of called Phantom (best of 2007–2017) that is the combination show of black light theatre, shadow theatre.and projections. This show was the only Czech theatre and the only black light theatre presented at 8th World Theatre Olympics 2018 in India.

== In Performance ==
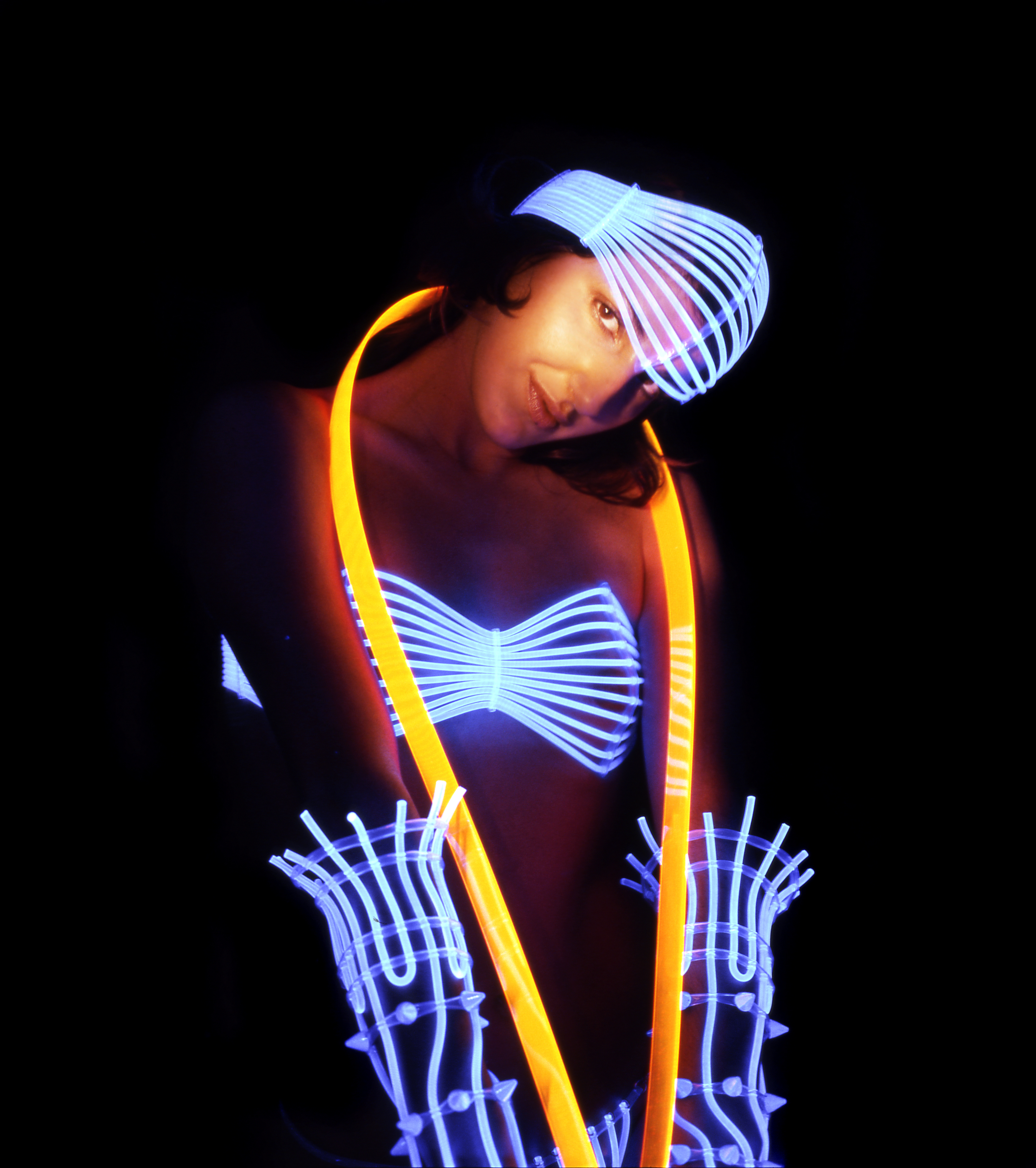
Fluorescent costume under UV light. Created by the artist Beo Beyond

The effect of black light theatre allows invisible performers to move visible props, turning the objects into independent participants in the theatre at the same level as the human actors. Furthermore, the appearance of objects and actors in a performance can be sudden and can occur anywhere on stage, even within a few meters of an audience member. In order to achieve this effect it is necessary to create an intense field of UV light throughout the entire playing space. Because the intensity of light emitted from a typical 'black light' source diminishes significantly with increased distance from the source, covering an entire theatre space with UV light requires either that the 'black light' sources be spaced as close as one meter apart or emit much more light than a typical 'black light'. Another important consideration is that, since most of the space is completely dark, and the form is heavily dance based, a single wrong move by a single performer can negatively impact the entire production. For this reason performers train extensively specifically for the black light theatre environment.

Contemporary black light theatre often includes many highly technical devices, in addition to the standard 'black light' technique. Such devices can include "flying" performers, dancers in LED-suits, large video projections, and even massive puppets. These technical devices serve as a significant factor in black light theatre's worldwide popularity; since its most important devices are entirely visual, audiences throughout the world can understand most black light theatre performances. The intended result is a theatrical work that combines grand spectacle with beautiful and moving art. Major companies currently producing black light theatre include Srnec Theatre, HILT, Ta Fantastika Theatre, Image Theatre, Metro Theatre, and All Colours Theatre.
