= Theatre in education =

Theater Education in Britain

Theatre in education (TIE), originating in Britain in 1965, is the use of theatre for purposes beyond entertainment. It involves trained actors/educators performing for students or communities, with the intention of changing knowledge, attitudes, and behaviour. Canadian academics Monica Prendergast and Juliana Saxton describe TIE as "one of the two historic roots of applied theatre practice".

TIE typically includes a theatre company performing a high-impact, child-centred performance for a specifically targeted school audience, including interactive and performative moments. Audiences are small, allowing students to participate through work in-role and debate. Student experimentation is supported with resource materials and training or support for the students by teachers.

== Difference between Drama in Education and Theatre in Education ==
Two widely used approaches are Drama in Education and TIE.

Drama in Education: In the school curriculum, this is both a method and a subject. As a curriculum subject, it uses various dramatic elements and acting out. In many high schools, drama is now a separate department. In some primary schools, it is used to teach a number of subjects.

Theatre in Education: A professional team of trained and experienced actor-teachers prepares materials, projects, and experiments to be presented in schools. TIE programmes often involve more than one visit, are usually devised and researched by the team/teachers, and are for small groups of one or two classes of a specific age. The aim of the programmes is educational, using theatre, drama in education, and teaching techniques for educational purposes. The number of participation sessions, performances and discussions will vary according to location. Many theatre companies using TIE start from a strong left-wing or didactic approach to their subject matter, questioning societal ideas and values.

== Production characteristics ==
TIE productions will have a clear aim and educational objective. Projects are low budget, with a small cast of actors who will often take several roles and play musical instruments. TIE productions are portable, with costumes and designs that are simple and representational. Including audience involvement and frequent narration, productions will explore issues from different viewpoints to demonstrate the effect of an action on a range of people. Productions may include facts and figures to educate the audience, as well as a strong message or moral throughout.

== How TIE can be used ==
Supported by resource materials, TIE productions can be designed to stimulate reaction and participation from small audiences through role-play and debate. For very young children, the production can be based on the traditional story, allowing a range of follow-up activities. For adults, some additional dramatizing activities may be added, for example, learning parenting skills or preparing for employment.

== In schools ==
The Role of Teacher

As an alternative to knowledge dissemination, memory-based teaching, Drama games and fun during lessons leads to better engagement. Instead of lecturing, the teacher in the TIE setting can become a conceptual artist who moulds knowledge, feelings, thoughts, sensations, and experience into an active and stimulating educational process. This is not about an artist in a traditional way. It's more a way of thinking, perceiving the world and its needs in a right-brained way as non-linear, practical, intuitive, and holistic.

- Teacher's typology

The teacher's personality influences the use of drama in lessons. According to Barucha, teacher types fall into four quadrants (see Figure 1). Barucha differentiates two dimensions depending on the teacher's behaviour, perception, values, and attitudes: the interactivity level and the level of logical/emphatic thinking. Both dimensions operate on a whole scale in between the extreme values.

The Role of Student

In this methodology, students need to understand that the role of the teacher changes. In TIE, the students themselves assume a degree of initiative and responsibility. TIE demands greater independence of thought. In this process of structured learning, drama rehearsals require full dedication. Due to this and closer interpersonal interaction, the process can lead to more clashes compared to traditional class teaching. There are several issues apart from memory training, courage to act, and the ability to emerge from the shell that each of us adopts at work or at school; there can be language difficulties, stage fright, newness in being expected to adopt a role, confidence, etc.

Summarizing the main requirements and preconditions as follows:

- Intellectual maturity, ability to understand the play and roles
- Ability to comprehend the cost and investment, but also the benefits. Openness to new methods of teaching and learning
- Time management or commitment
- Acceptance of guiding role of the teacher without formal authority
- Language competence
- Performance skills/competence (active attitude to potential stage fright issues, memory issues etc.)
- Collective work competence
- Controlling emotional intelligence and ability to cooperate even in stressful moments (like a performance)

== Some theatre improvisation games ==
Here are some theatre games.

1) Alphabet conversation

In a group of students, start a conversation one by one where each sentence begins with the next letter of the alphabet. Giving examples before you begin will help the participants. Students can also use sounds to start a sentence, for example “Mmmm” or “tut-tut”. This game can be played in pairs or small groups. Here is an example:

A: Anyone seen my cat?

B: Black one, with funny eyes?

A: Can't say I remember.

B: Don't tell me you've forgotten what it looks like?

A: Every cat looks the same to me.

B: Fortunately, I found one yesterday.

A: Gee, that's great...

- Try starting somewhere in the middle of the alphabet. Then when you reach “Z”, return to “A” until you arrive back where you started. This technique can be combined with one-word stories.

2) People poems

Divide the class into small groups of four or five. To each group give a topic or word; e.g. “Time”. Now each person in each group has to write down or remember words associated with the theme - eg. slow, fast, boredom, quickly, or centuries. Each group has to make an object out of the members, linked to the theme (such as a clock). Ideally the group's object should move. Next, each group must bring the object to life and work out a way to bring in some or all of their words - linked to their movements. At the end they show the resulting people poem to the rest of the class, who try to guess the theme. Themes can include:

- Elements - earth, air, fire, water
- Opposites – cold/hot, fast/slow, high/low
- Colours
- Emotions
