= The Passage (charity) =

British nonprofit organization

- Founded: 1980; 46 years ago
- Type: Charity
- Registration no.: 1079764
- Location: St Vincent's Centre, Carlisle Place London
- Revenue: £12,325,654 (2022)
- Staff: 128 (March 2023)
- Website: passage.org.uk

The Passage, founded in 1980, runs London's largest voluntary sector day centre for homeless and vulnerable people helping over 200 people every day to access diverse services, including primary services (breakfast and lunch, showers, access to clothes, laundry facilities, etc.), housing and welfare advice, health services and employment and training services. The day centre, located in Westminster, operates alongside homelessness prevention initiatives and an innovative modern slavery referral program.

Alongside the day centre, the Passage manages multiple accommodation projects: Passage House, a 37-bed rapid-response hostel, as well as Montfort House, which contains 16 self-contained studio flats with on-site staff support for those preparing for independent living, and Bentley House, a 20-bed accommodation project offering more long-term accommodation support.

The Passage has been supported by numerous organisations and individuals including Cherie Blair, Sir Stuart Rose, Marks & Spencer, and Hard Rock Café.

The Passage became the first charity organisation that Prince William visited with his mother, Princess Diana in 1993. Since then, he has made numerous public and private trips to the organisation. On February 13, 2019, Prince William became the patron of the organization At the end of 2023, he visited the Passage to help volunteers serve lunch at their client Christmas party.

For their 30th anniversary, the Passage and 85FOUR created an exhibition, THIRTY by THIRTY. The exhibition showcases 30 subjects such as Cherie Blair, Rory Bremner, Sir Stuart Rose, John Varley, Housing Minister Grant Shapps and Archbishop Vincent Nichols just to name a few – as well as a number of clients the Passage has helped to turn their lives around, colleagues, volunteers and supporters. 30 different photographers including Bob Wheeler, Alan Mahon, Paul Wenham-Clarke and Tom Hunter took images.

The Passage is a member organisation of the Caritas Social Action Network (CSAN).

== See also ==
- Basil Hume
- Crisis charity
- Homelessness in the United Kingdom
- John Studzinski
- St Mungo's charity
