= Love Patrol =

- Genre: soap opera, edutainment (HIV-AIDS)
- Created by: Wan Smolbag Theatre
- Starring: Noel Aru, Lucy Seresere, James Langdale, Annette Charlie, Bob Homu, Yvette Vatu and others
- Country of origin: Vanuatu
- Original language: English
- No. of series: 8
- No. of episodes: 80

Production
- Producer: Wan Smolbag Theatre
- Production location: Vanuatu

Original release
- Release: April 2007 – 2014

Love Patrol is a ni-Vanuatu television series. It is the first ever locally produced television series in Vanuatu. Produced by Wan Smolbag Theatre with financial assistance from AusAID, NZAID and the Asian Development Bank, it is a soap opera with a serious message, intended primarily to educate viewers on the topic of AIDS. It also tackles "youth unemployment, police brutality and the hypocrisy of keeping youth uninformed about sex". UNAIDS reported that it explores "the growing issues of high rates of STIs among young people, high teenage pregnancy, lack of discourse on sex and risk taking behaviours in [...] Pacific communities". It has been described as an "edutainment" series.

A review in the Fiji Times explained that the series

"centres on the life of a detective who works in a police station in an urban centre somewhere in the Pacific. The detective, named Mark, desperately wants his wife to have a child but gets caught up with Rita, a singer in a bar. The series also involves a gang of boys who steal from a minister's house and the search for the boys exposes the other side of paradise. The mini-series aims to look at the causes for the growing HIV/AIDS epidemic in the region."

The series is written by Jo Dorras, and directed by Peter Walker, with Danny Phillips as cinematographer. It stars Noel Aru, James Langdale, Lucy Seresere, Annette Charlie, Bob Homu, Yvette Vatu, Elsie Apia, Morinda Tari, Danny Marcel, Titus Taripu, Florence Vira, Albert Tommy, Betio Albert, Charleon Falau and Gloria Lango. Each episode lasts about 21 minutes.

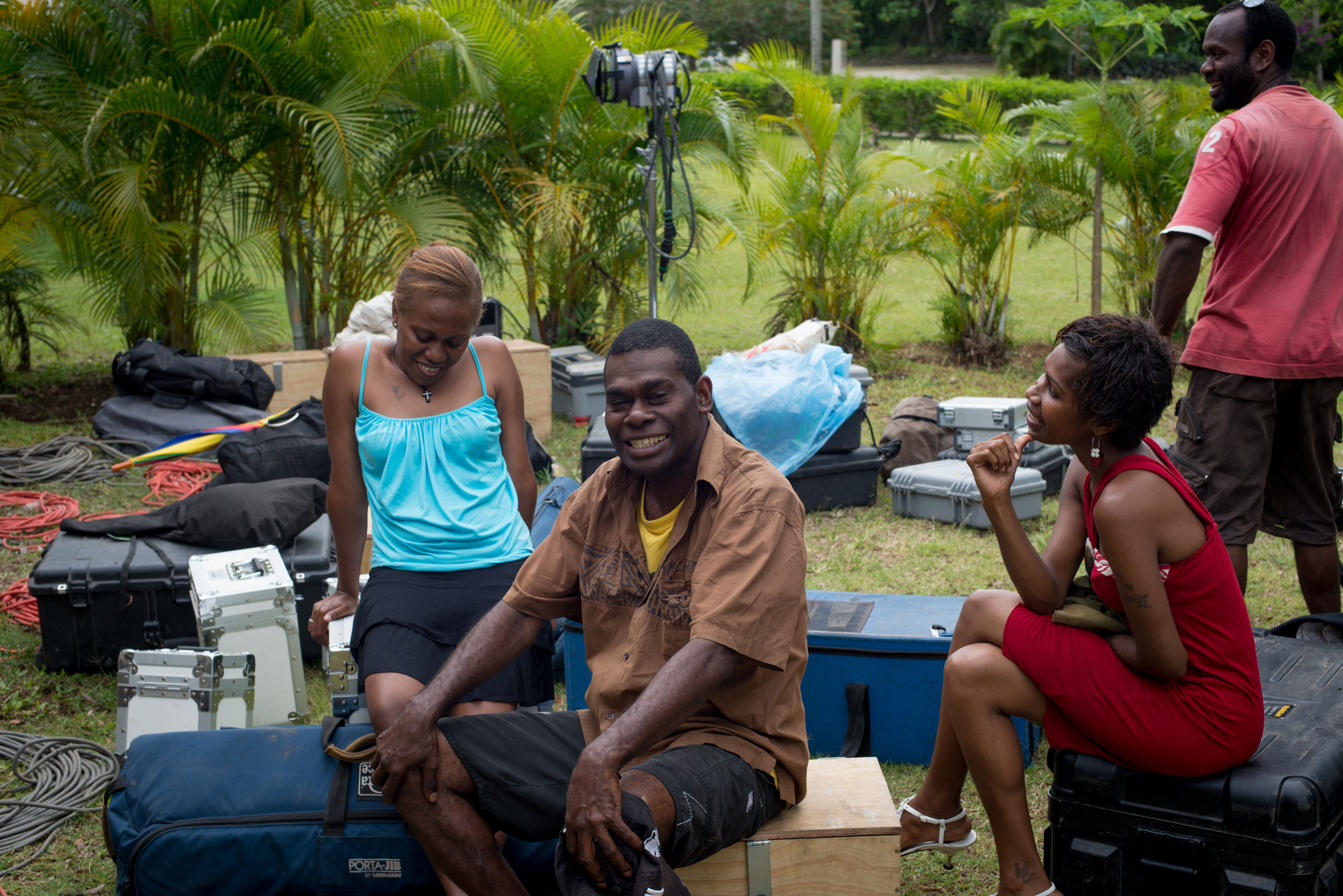
On the set of Love Patrol in 2012.

== Broadcasting ==
The first season premiered on television in Vanuatu and in Fiji starting in April 2007, and contained ten episodes, focused on Elizabeth, one of the main characters. It has subsequently been broadcast in the Cook Islands, Kiribati, New Zealand, Australia, Papua New Guinea, Samoa, the Solomon Islands, Tonga and Tuvalu, with plans to distribute the series on DVD throughout the region. In New Zealand, the first season was broadcast on Whakaata Māori (Māori Television) from May 2008. In Papua New Guinea, it was broadcast on CHM Supersound channel. In Fiji, it was broadcast by Fiji TV, which then conducted a survey and found that "up to 15% of the whole population watched the whole series". Subsequently, season 1 was translated into French by the Secretariat of the Pacific Community, and released on DVD under the title L'Amour sous haute surveillance.

A second season went into production in 2008. It took "about one year of hard work to get the funding, writing the stories and doing the shooting at the various locations in Vanuatu", including eighteen weeks of shooting.

The first four episodes of season 2 were screened at the Asia Pacific HIV AIDS Conference in Bali in August 2009. They were then screened at Wan Smolbag's Smolbag Haos in Vanuatu on 6 September. All ten episodes were broadcast on local television, one a week, from October. Initial episodes were also broadcast in cinemas in Fiji in October 2009, and in the Solomon Islands in December. It is due to be broadcast throughout the region on ABC International, Māori Television and several Pacific Island channels.

The third season also consisted of ten episodes. Production began in August 2009, and was completed in December. The filming of season 4 began in July 2010, funded by the Secretariat of the Pacific Community, AusAID and NZAID.

The fourth season was completed in December 2010 and WSB received funding from AusAid to allow a fifth season to be filmed.

Season 5 began to air in October 2012, with a focus on "socially transmitted infections such as HIV, crime, gender inequality, family breakdowns violence, politics and also on the effects on the entry of guns into the country". At that time, season 6 "ha[d] been written and filming [was] in process".

== Resource guidebooks ==
In August 2008, 9,000 copies of a resource guidebook for the series' first season were printed and distributed in schools in several Pacific countries. It was also released online on Wan Smolbag's website. It suggests class activities such as group discussions focused on a particular episode (e.g. "Why do you think the three boys steal? Is breaking into houses a growing problem in your country? If so, why do you think it is happening more often?”); role playing; story-writing; reading scene scripts from the episodes, and discussing them. For example, students may be asked to read, understand and explain the script of a scene in which a nurse explains to a character the ways in which HIV AIDS is transmitted. ("You’ve heard of HIV and AIDS, haven’t you? It spreads through blood and sex… If there’s infected blood on a needle and you use it on someone else, they can get the sickness. […] [I]f you do a tattoo or get your ears pierced, make sure you use a new needle […]!”)

The final pages explain what HIV is, how it spreads, how to use a condom, and where to go for HIV testing.

Similar guidebooks were released for community discussions among adults and French language versions of both the series one teacher resource and community resource now exist. Further workbooks for series two and three take the form of photo cartoons for the storyline consolidated by similar group exercises on discussion themes taken from the series, e.g. drugs, relationships, homosexuality and prostitution. The series three book will be in print in early 2011.

== Reviews and reactions ==
Love Patrol has proven popular. According to the Secretariat of the Pacific Community, "a random street poll showed that over 90% of people [in Port Vila, the capital] were watching every episode (even the repeats)".

Reviewing the series, the magazine Islands Business noted:

"Unlike one-off productions, the series allows viewers to identify more closely with characters and themes across time and opens the way for the material on HIV and other development issues to become part of the conversational fabric of a community. Tapping into these advantages, 'Love Patrol' portrays strong characters with whom the audience can identify."

The United Nations Economic and Social Commission for Asia and the Pacific described Love Patrol as a "new and innovative approach to HIV prevention", noting that it was "immensely popular" both in Vanuatu and in Fiji.

AusAID reported that it had been a "smash hit throughout the Pacific", and that "[t]he program has been particularly successful in breaking down barriers around HIV". It reported one of the series' leading actresses, Annette Vira, as stating: "People are far more at ease talking about HIV and AIDS now that it’s discussed openly on television and they’re also getting the messages about prevention, harm reduction and testing for infection".

Jane Clifton, for The Dominion Post, wrote the following review while the second season was being aired on Māori Television in New Zealand: "Considering this is Vanuatu's first television production, it's outstanding, and it's such a different experience to be watching something that you know is aimed squarely at social engineering, as well as ratings". She added: "The genius of using a serial rather than one-off programme is that users get engrossed in the characters, and see them almost as real and real-time figures, so the social messages wound into the stories are easily assimilated. This must go triple for a country not accustomed to seeing itself portrayed in television drama. Cunning - and very worthy."
