= Learning to Love You More =

American crowdsourced art project

Learning to Love You More (LTLYM) was an American crowdsourced art project, where over 8,000 people posted work they had created in response to a series of prompts over a span of seven years. The project was created in 2002 by Miranda July and Harrell Fletcher, with a website created by Yuri Ono. In May 2009, the authors discontinued the project, ending with a final assignment asking people to "Say Goodbye." In 2010, SFMOMA acquired the work. The work has been exhibited at The Whitney Museum of American Art in New York, Rhodes College in Memphis, the Aurora Picture Show in Houston, The Seattle Art Museum in Seattle, the Wattis Institute for Contemporary Arts in San Francisco, and the San Francisco Museum of Modern Art.

== Book ==
In 2007, July and Fletcher published the book Learning to Love You More, (published by Prestel) which features selections from the website. Ken Johnson of the New York Times called it " delightful, often funny and at times surprisingly moving." Publishers Weekly wrote that "The resonance of the work... is sadly diminished in book form, where a willing lack of organization often isolates contributions from the same assignment."
