= Invisible theater =

Invisible theatre is a form of theatrical performance that is enacted in a place where people would not normally expect to see one, for example in the street or in a shopping centre. Performers disguise the fact that it is a performance from those who observe and who may choose to participate in it, thus leading spectators to view it as a real, unstaged event.

The Brazilian theater practitioner Augusto Boal and Panagiotis Assimakopoulos developed the form during their time in Argentina in the 1960s as part of Boal's Theatre of the Oppressed, which focused on oppression and social issues. Invisible theatre developed in the context of increasingly repressive dictatorship in Brazil and Argentina. The purpose of invisible theatre was to show oppression in everyday life, in an everyday setting, without the audience or "spect-actors" knowing. Boal went on to develop forum theater.

== Invisible theatre in Argentina ==
Invisible theatre was developed in Buenos Aires as public and participatory action that avoided police authority. The Brazilian Augusto Boal was in exile in Argentina from 1971 to 1976 and created his first invisible theatre experiment in collaboration with a group of actors. The performance took place in a busy restaurant at lunchtime, with actors sitting at different tables. One actor ordered à la carte, but at the end of the lunch told the waiter that he could not pay the 70 soles. He offered to pay with his labour and asked the waiter how much he would get paid taking out the rubbish. Another actor, seated at another table, informed the customers that a rubbish collector gets paid 7 sole per hour. Yet another actor, at yet another table, told everyone that a gardener gets 10 soles per hour. Eventually another member of the cast started to collect money from the restaurant customers to pay the bill.

Boal took theatre to an audience who did not recognise that they were the audience; he argued it was critical that actors participating in the invisible theatre did not reveal that they were actors. In its early phase, invisible theatre aimed to raise public awareness of class differences and to provide a forum for articulating dissent.

== Invisible theatre in Europe ==
In the late 1970s and the early 1980s Boal staged invisible theatre performances in Sicily, Stockholm, Paris and other European cities, in public locations like the Paris Metro and on Stockholm ferries. These performances tackled issues such as racism, ageism, sexism and homelessness.

== Invisible theatre in Brazil ==
When Boal returned to Brazil in 1986, he produced a weekly invisible theatre for a Rio TV station. In one episode a dark-skinned man sold himself as a slave in the market, informing the crowd that he earned less than a 19th-century slave.

== Comparison to happenings ==
Historically, invisible theatre developed after happenings had been staged in Argentina by Oscar Mosatta. Mosatta had staged happenings in the late 1960s after he had attended such performances in New York in 1966. While happenings are also used to raise awareness about an issue, take place outside a theatre or gallery, and are scripted, the audience is aware that they are attending a happening. Boal states in Tecnicas latinoamericanas de teatro popular that invisible theater and happenings are distinct: "El teatro invisible no debe ser confundido con el happening, que es un hecho teatral insólito, caótico, en que todo puede ocurrir, anárquicamente." ["Invisible theater must not be confused with the happening, which is an unusual theatrical event, chaotic, in which anything can occur, anarchically."]

== See also ==
- Artivism
- Street performance

== Sources ==
- Augusto Boal. 1974, 2000. Theater of the Oppressed. New edition. Translated from the Spanish (Teatro del Oprimido) by Charles A. McBride, Maria-Odilia Leal McBride and Emily Fryer. Pluto Press, London. pp. 143–147. ISBN 0-7453-1658-1 https://books.google.com/books?id=g8ZbuK6AlqsC
