= Caritas Social Action Network =

Catholic charity organisation in England and Wales

- Abbreviation: CSAN
- Established: 2003; 23 years ago
- Founder: Catholic Bishops' Conference of England and Wales
- Type: Company limited by guarantee
- Registration no.: 1101431
- Location: London, United Kingdom
- Coordinates: 51.4983°N 0.1078°W
- Origins: Catholic Social Teaching
- Services: advocacy (national team), social services (members)
- Official language: English
- Patron: Cardinal Vincent Nichols
- Affiliations: Caritas Internationalis, Caritas Europa
- Website: www.csan.org.uk

Caritas Social Action Network or CSAN is a British not-for-profit social welfare and social justice organisation. It is a service of the Catholic Church in England and Wales and a member of both Caritas Internationalis and Caritas Europa.

Its sister agency for international humanitarian aid and development is the Catholic Agency for Overseas Development (CAFOD).

== History ==
Caritas Social Action Network (CSAN) was established in March 2003 to elevate the visibility and influence of Catholic contributions to social justice in England and Wales. CSAN consolidated the functions of three previous social welfare organisations affiliated with the Catholic Bishops' Conference of England and Wales: the bishops' own Social Welfare Committee, which had been established in 1984, the Catholic Agency for Social Concern (CASC), and the Catholic Child Welfare Council (CCWC).

The merger of these organisations into CSAN was intended to enhance the Church's capacity to influence public discourse and policy on social care. CSAN also gained an international dimension, becoming a member of Caritas Internationalis and Caritas Europa, fostering collaboration on global and European social welfare initiatives.

== Structure and work ==
CSAN is a federation of more than 50 different Catholic organisations in England and Wales working with a range of stakeholders, including children and families, homeless persons, migrants and refugees, severely and multiply disadvantaged people, young criminals, older people, persons suffering from addiction, and many others.

As of 2024, the member organisations of CSAN are:

- British Province of the Society of Jesus
- Cardinal Hume Centre
- Caritas Archdiocese of Birmingham
- Caritas Archdiocese of Cardiff
- Caritas Arundel and Brighton
- Caritas Clifton
- Caritas Diocese of Brentwood
- Caritas Diocese of Hallam
- Caritas Diocese of Middlesbrough
- Caritas Diocese of Nottingham
- Caritas Diocese of Plymouth
- Caritas Diocese of Portsmouth
- Caritas Diocese of Salford
- Caritas Diocese of Shrewsbury
- Caritas Diocese of Westminster
- Caritas East Anglia
- Caritas Hexham and Newcastle
- Caritas Jersey
- Caritas Northampton
- Caritas Social Action Network (National Team)
- Caritas Southwark
- Catholic Association for Racial Justice (CARJ)
- Catholic Care (Caritas Leeds)
- Catholic Children's Society (Westminster)
- Catholic Disability Fellowship
- Catholics for AIDS Prevention and Support (CAPS)
- Daughters of Charity Services
- Depaul UK
- Father Hudson's Caritas (formerly Father Hudson's Society)
- Institute of Our Lady of Mercy
- Irish Chaplaincy
- Jesuit Refugee Service UK
- Marriage Care
- Million Minutes
- National Board of Catholic Women
- NOAH Enterprise
- Nugent
- Out There
- Prison Advice and Care Trust (PACT)
- Seeking Sanctuary
- Society of St Vincent de Paul (England and Wales)
- St Antony's Centre for Church and Industry
- St Elizabeth's Centre
- St John of God Hospitaller Services
- St Joseph’s Hospice
- Stella Maris
- The Centre for Theology and Community
- The Medaille Trust
- The Passage
- Together for the Common Good
- women@thewell
- Young Christian Workers (YCW)

The Catholic Social Action Network maintains a small national team based in London and is active in the coordination and support of its members, as well as in advocacy.
