= The Medaille Trust =

British charity for modern slavery victims

The Medaille Trust is a UK-based charity founded by several Catholic Congregations. Its main aim is to bring restoration and freedom to victims of human trafficking. The charity was established in 2006 and has since grown into a national network supporting all people trapped in modern slavery – women, men and families.

Medaille Trust is currently the largest provider of supported safe house beds for victims of modern slavery in the UK. They combat human trafficking and modern slavery by offering safe housing, providing support for victims, raising awareness in communities, and partnering with law enforcement authorities.

The Medaille Trust is a member organisation of the Caritas Social Action Network (CSAN).
