= Participatory theatre =

Form of theatre with audience interaction

Participatory theatre is a form of theatre in which the audience interacts with the performers or the presenters. Participatory theatre is often used with very young audiences, allowing babies and toddlers to join in with the action.

Despite a long history and traditions of audience participation within genres such as music hall and pantomime, fully participatory theatre is still sometimes viewed as avant-garde. In a typical participatory production, performers may socialise with audience members before the show while seating them, then surprise these spectators by inviting them to the stage. Audience members may be given dialogue to read (as written text, or via an earpiece in some cases). They may be invited to participate in an activity or game. Classroom and lecture exercises often include participatory elements, though are not usually considered theatre.

Companies producing participatory work include National Theatre Wales, Spare Tyre Theatre Company and The Republic of The Imagination (TROTI), Wales.

== See also ==
- Interactive theatre
- Public participation
