= New Zealand Agency for International Development =

New Zealand governmental aid agency

The New Zealand Aid Programme
- Logo of the New Zealand Aid Programme

Agency overview
- Jurisdiction: New Zealand’s official development assistance (ODA)
- Headquarters: Wellington, New Zealand
- Ministers responsible: Winston Peters, Minister of Foreign Affairs; Todd McClay, Associate Minister of Foreign Affairs
- Agency executive: Jonathan Kings, Deputy Secretary, Pacific and Development Group
- Parent agency: New Zealand Ministry of Foreign Affairs and Trade
- Website: https://www.mfat.govt.nz/en/aid-and-development/

The New Zealand Aid Programme is the New Zealand Government's international aid and development agency. The New Zealand Aid Programme is managed by the Pacific and Development Group in the New Zealand Ministry of Foreign Affairs and Trade (MFAT). Previously a semi-autonomous body known as the New Zealand Agency for International Development (NZAID), it was reintegrated back into MFAT as the International Development Group following a restructure in 2009. Its Māori name is Nga Hoe Tuputupu-mai-tawhiti – the paddles that bring growth from afar. The Head of the New Zealand Aid Programme is Jonathan Kings, a lawyer and public servant. According to the OECD, New Zealand’s total official development assistance (ODA) (USD 537.6 million, preliminary data) decreased in 2022 due to fewer disbursements within its three-year budget cycle and represented 0.23% of gross national income (GNI).

== History ==
NZAID was established in 2002 by the Fifth Labour Government with the launching of a new overseas aid policy, "Towards a Safe and Just World Free of Poverty". The establishment of NZAID as a semi-autonomous body marked a significant shift in the management of New Zealand official development assistance (ODA). Prior to 2002, ODA had been managed by MFAT using largely non-specialist staff, policies and procedures.

A Ministerial Review in 2001 found that New Zealand's management of ODA lacked a clear mission: "Management and staff are pursuing poorly defined development assistance, foreign policy and trade objectives. There is a serious confusion of purpose. At the implementing end, desk officers are uncertain and concerned about the core mission of their work." The 2001 Review found that NZ ODA lacked focus; poverty analyses on which to base decisions; systematic analysis of past performance; and systematic use of good practice in aid design and delivery. The rotational staffing system (whereby career MFAT staff were rotated through the aid management division, rather than recruited specifically for skills and experience in ODA issues) had led to the relevant area of MFAT being regarded as "both a training ground for diplomats and a dumping ground for non-performers". Basic issues of staff and document management were found wanting. The establishment of NZAID was a response to these and other problems.

The Cabinet Minute (01) 28/8 which mandated the creation of NZAID "set the following major directions for New Zealand's ODA:

- Elimination of poverty as the central focus of NZAID, which would need to be incorporated in a new policy framework.
- Integration of the International Development Targets (IDTs) – subsequently incorporated into the Millennium Development Goals (MDGs) – within the new policy framework, and in Pacific regional strategy papers.
- A complete overhaul of the NZODA policy framework that would need to be strategic, accountable and focused, based on international best practice in ODA.
- Bilateral programmes to be based on country-based poverty analysis and country programme strategies.
- A core focus on the Pacific should be maintained.
- Development Assistance to the Cook Islands, Niue and Tokelau should remain within the NZODA programme.
- A bilateral assessment framework should consider the degree to which the ODA programme was too dispersed, and a strategic approach to funding multilateral allocations should be adopted.
- A new education strategy should be developed that would give greater prominence to basic education needs and individual country circumstances.
- NZODA should mainstream human rights, gender and environment throughout its operations.
- A framework should be developed for determining the level of contributions to regional and multilateral institutions.
- Monitoring and evaluation systems to measure the impact of New Zealand ODA should be established.
- NZODA should develop 'centres of excellence' in aid delivery."

== Structure ==
The New Zealand Aid Programme, through the Pacific and Development Group, consists of the following organisational divisions:

- Deputy Secretary Office
- Pacific Regional Division
- Pacific Bilateral Division - Polynesia & French Pacific
- Pacific Bilateral Division - Melanesia & Micronesia
- Global Development & Scholarships Division
- Partnerships, Humanitarian & Multilateral Division
- Development Economy & Prosperity Division
- Development People & Planet Division
- Development Capability & Insights Division

== Development approach ==
New Zealand aims for “a more peaceful world, in which all people live in dignity and safety, all countries can prosper and our shared environment is protected”. Through its policy for International Cooperation for Effective Sustainable Development, New Zealand progresses the social, environmental, economic, and stability and governance pillars of sustainable development. New Zealand’s ODA spending focuses on countries most in need, particularly Small Island Developing States and Least developed countries. New Zealand’s ODA has a primary geographic focus on the Pacific Ocean, and a secondary geographic focus on Southeast Asia. Beyond this, it achieves global reach through the multilateral system and regional programmes.

== Area of operation ==
In 2009, Cabinet agreed to the mission statement and directed that within this the core focus be sustainable economic development. Cabinet also directed that the Pacific remain the core geographic focus and receive an increased portion of New Zealand's ODA.

New Zealand’s policy for International Cooperation for Effective Sustainable Development was approved by Cabinet on 25 November 2019, confirming the New Zealand Aid Programme's primary focus on the Pacific region, in line with the Pacific Reset. It also affirms four development principles to guide development work: effectiveness, inclusiveness, resilience, and sustainability. They replace earlier policies on development quality, including the Cross-Cutting Issues Policy and Activity Quality Policy.

A February 2021 Parliament Inquiry into New Zealand's Aid to the Pacific recommended continuing to increase ODA to the Pacific, and promoting empowerment, inclusion, and local ownership.

== Controversy and criticism ==
In 2008, the Office of the Controller and Auditor-General and Audit New Zealand released critical reports on NZAID procedures and systems, leading to negative comments in New Zealand Parliament and critical media coverage. NZAID has responded with a programme to "strengthen internal systems and processes".

NGOs in New Zealand have defended the performance of NZAID. The most significant NGO criticism of the New Zealand aid programme is that it should be larger.

The New Zealand National Party have claimed that overseas aid needs "fresh thinking" and that "Over many years and various Governments, New Zealand aid has encouraged the growth of political structures and bureaucracy that are not sustainable." and that "there is no evidence that the major problems identified in the 2005 report by Professor Marilyn Waring have been rectified."

Trevor Loudon, a previous Vice-President of the right wing libertarian ACT Party, has criticised NZAID as an organisation, and individuals within it, for having a "socialist bent" and funding organisations that are "more political than aid oriented". However, there has been noticeably less criticism of this sort in New Zealand than in Australia.
