= Image theatre =

Image theatre is a performance technique in which one person, acting as a sculptor, moulds one or more people acting as statues, using only touch and resisting the use of words or mirror-image modelling. The images presented in this form of theatre are a series of still-images or tableauxs that are dynamised (brought to life) via a variety of ways. They could have repetitive sounds and mechanical-like movements designed into them for example, or they could be dynamised by transitioning from one image to the other in a before-during-after style format. The images can be directly clear to the viewer or abstract. The sculptor can also be a statue, and thus mould themselves, or the statues themselves can be invited to sculpt their own ideas and perspectives into the image.

Image theatre originated as a form of theatrical protest in the Theatre of the Oppressed created by Augusto Boal in the 1960s. The form increased in popularity within performance studies and broadened in use to become an exercise or game for students of performance learning how to see what they are looking at, in a format that is not constricted to learning lines, didactic explanations or one person's directorial ambitions. Actors do not use words or signs (i.e. nodding) but must instead use their hands to create an image out of another actor's body to communicate an idea, an event, or an emotion.
