= Forum theatre =

Interactive theatre exploring social justice through participation

Forum theatre is a type of theatre created by Brazilian theatre director Augusto Boal. It is one of the techniques under the umbrella term of Theatre of the Oppressed (TO). This relates to the engagement of spectators influencing and engaging with the performance as both spectators and actors, termed "spect-actors", with the power to stop and change the performance. As part of TO, the issues dealt with in forum theatre are often related to areas of social justice, with the aim of exploring solutions to oppression featured in the performance.

== History ==
In the 1960s, Augusto Boal and his theatre company the Teatro de Arena de São Paulo travelled through some of the poorest places in Brazil, staging productions which urged action against various injustices and oppressors. These performances often ended with the actors exhorting their audiences of peasants to spill their own blood in this struggle. This continued until an encounter with a peasant who extended an invitation to the actors to take up arms against an oppressive landowner. The actors explained that their guns were fake, and that they would only be a hindrance, to which the peasant left after realising the actors weren’t willing to take the risks they were asking others to take. Realising he was not prepared to take the same risks he was asking others to, Boal decided to never again write plays which gave advice or sent ‘messages’.

Later in 1973, while working within a theatre literacy project in Peru based on the teachings of Paulo Freire, Boal applied a form of theatre he titled 'simultaneous dramaturgy'. These plays were based around finding the solution to a problem posed at a moment of crisis for the protagonist. At this moment, the audience would be invited to suggest actions for the actor to perform to solve the problem, framed as a way of facilitating a learning environment (although the interpretation of suggestions was up to the actors). During one performance, a member of the audience couldn't have their idea interpreted by the actor to their satisfaction and so was invited on stage to perform their suggestion.

It was out of these experiences that forum theatre was born, with the forum as part of the show. This changed the work of the artists to create a new space of collective learning between the artists and the community.

== Methodology ==
Forum theatre begins with a short performance, either rehearsed or improvised, which contains demonstrations of social or political problems. Forum Theater, one of the major techniques within Theatre of the Oppressed, allows spectators to collaborate in the experience by becoming ‘spect-actors’ (the audiences who participate in the actual performance). Through a moderator (Joker) and a group of actively engaged spectators, Forum Theatre embodies dialogues, exchanges, learning, teaching, and pleasure. At the conclusion, the play will begin again with the audience being able to replace or add to the characters on stage to present their interventions; Alternative solutions to the problems faced.

The presentations include one person who acts as the ‘joker’, a facilitator for the forum theatre session. They are to hold an impartial view of the interventions, ask the audience to evaluate what happened at the end of an intervention, facilitate the interventions such that each spect-actor is able to complete their intervention before another is free to enact their intervention, and to be watching out for interventions which are implausible and ask the audience to decide whether the intervention is a ‘magic’ solution.

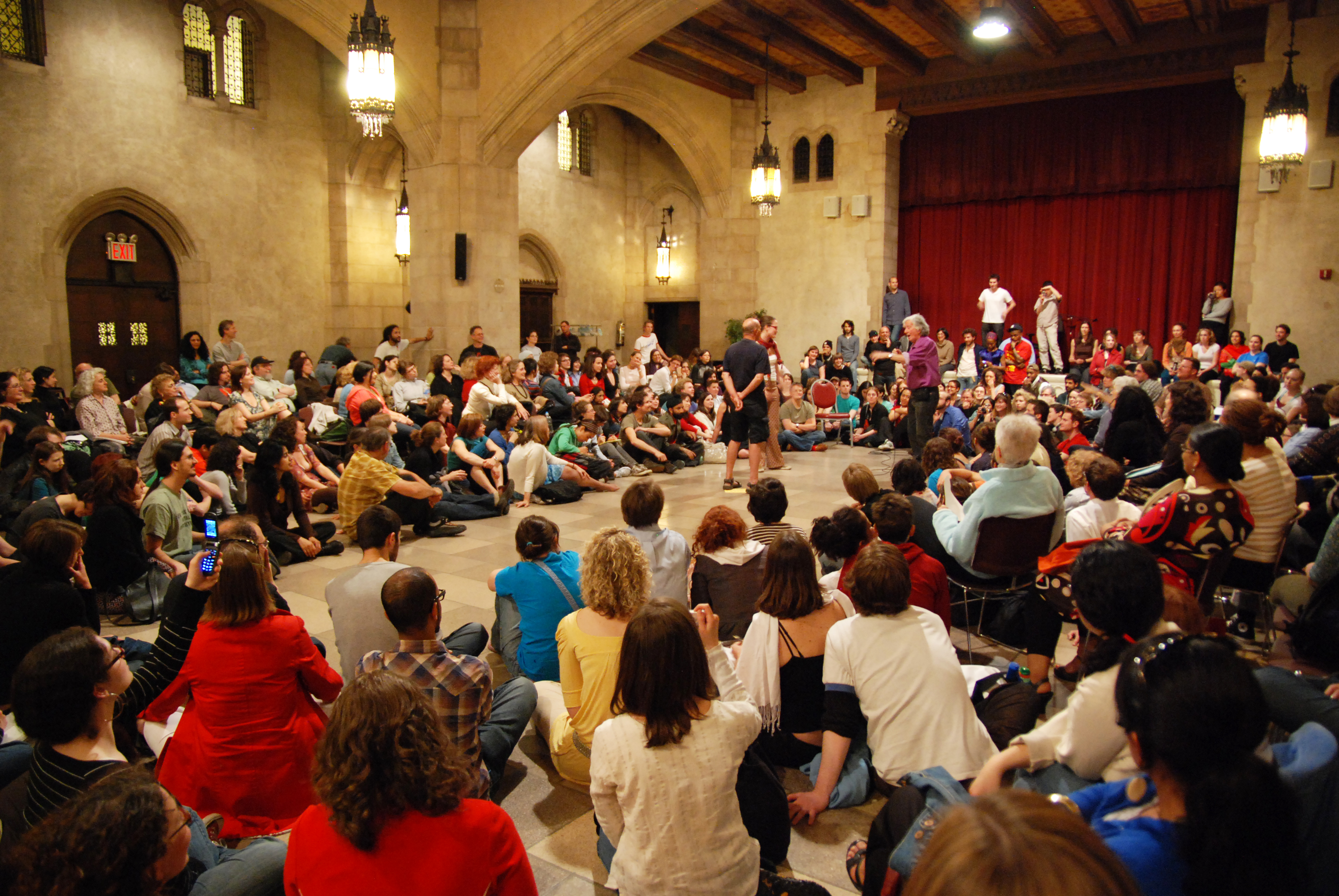
Brazilian theater director and writer Augusto Boal presenting his Theatre of the Oppressed at Riverside Church in New York City

== Applications ==
Some practice close to Boal's traditional method continues in the UK notably undertaken by Adrian Jackson, a translator of multiple works by Boal, and the founder of the Cardboard Citizens company. Canadian based theatre director David Diamond developed Theatre for Living techniques from Theatre of the Oppressed and practices Forum Theatre productions incorporating systems theory to the work. His work differs primarily in that the spectators are not required to replace a protagonist, but can replace any character - even the antagonists - if they can "identify with their struggle". ActNow Theatre is an example of an Australian theatre company creating Forum Theatre projects in Adeliade. In Brisbane, The Queensland Shakespeare Ensemble (QSE) has worked with communities to create and present forums. QSE also offers training in Boal's Theatre of the Oppressed yearly. In Sri Lanka, Act4–Theatre for Change, founded and led by theatre practitioner Nalinda Premaratne, uses forum theatre alongside contemporary performance techniques in 'theatre-for-development' initiatives addressing social and development issues. In Africa, forum theatre is used to unite Africans and heal emotional wounds caused by colonialism, civil wars, and modern slavery. However, in the Democratic Republic of Congo, organizing forum theatres, that were helping child soldiers reintegrate into their society, is currently impossible due to security issues and lack of resources.

There are multiple documented uses of forum theatre within the health sector and associated learning environments, such as its use as a teaching tool for medical students on professionalism, as a tool for developing communication skills within a medical context, and as an unintended effect of an intervention intended for medical staff, to engage patients with an understanding of medical decisions.

== See also ==
- Theatre pedagogy
- Theatre of the Oppressed
- Playback Theatre
- Pan Intercultural Arts
