= List of improvisational theatre companies =

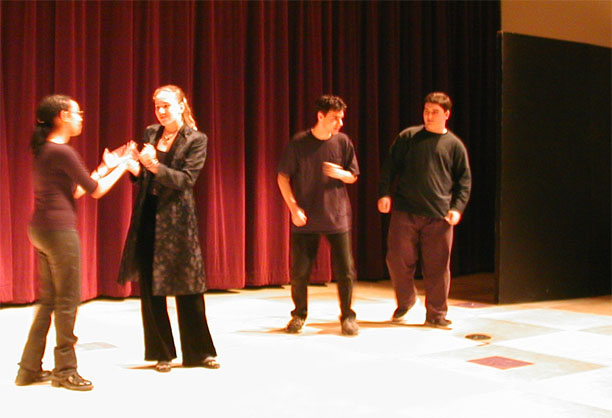
An improvisational comedy group performing onstage.

Improvisational theatre companies, also known as improv troupes or improv groups, are the primary practitioners of improvisational theater. Modern companies exist around the world and at a range of skill levels. Most groups make little or no money, while a few, well-established groups are profitable.

Although improvisational theater has existed in some form or another since the 16th century, modern improv began with the teachings of Viola Spolin in Chicago, Illinois, USA and Keith Johnstone during the 1940-50s in Calgary, Alberta, Canada. Spolin's teachings led to the creation of The Compass Players, the first modern improvisational theater company, in 1955. The presence of The Compass Players, The Second City, and ImprovOlympic in Chicago created a strength in the form within the city that continues to this day. New York City, San Francisco, Los Angeles, and Toronto are other major hubs of improvisational theater in the North America.

Many companies host improvisational theatre festivals or give improvisational theatre classes. Professional groups often perform a regular stage show acted by the most senior members. Along with this, they host "house" improv teams made up of improv students or graduates from their classes. In the past decade, professional improvisational theater groups have gradually started working more with corporate clients, using improvisational games to improve productivity and communication in the workplace.

Major Professional companies have branches in more than one city, have touring groups, and/or host large-scale improvisational comedy schools. Professional troupes are those not affiliated with a university or secondary school. Collegiate groups are those associated with a post-secondary educational institution. If a company performs more than one type of improvisational comedy, they are defined as using Multiple improvisational comedy types. If it is unclear what particular kind of improvisational comedy a group performs, they are defined as Improvisational. Those marked Semi-improvisational generally perform shows that are partially improvised and partially scripted.

The following is a list of noteworthy improvisational theatre companies (Note: A company is presumed noteworthy if it has received significant coverage in reliable sources that are independent of the company and satisfies the inclusion criteria for a stand-alone article.) from around the world.

== Improvisational theatre companies in Canada ==
Name	Group Level	Improv Type	Location	Date Established	Reference
The Bad Dog Theatre Company	Professional	Multiple	Toronto, Ontario	2003	
Die-Nasty	Professional	Television	Edmonton, Alberta	1991	
Ligue nationale d'improvisation	Professional	Improvisational	Quebec	1977	
Loose Moose Theatre	Professional	Theatresports	Calgary, Alberta	1977	
Rapid Fire Theatre	Professional	Theatresports	Edmonton, Alberta	1982	

== Improvisational theatre companies in the United States ==
Name	Group Level	Improv Type	Location	Date Established	Reference
8th Floor Improv Comedy	Collegiate	Multiple	Columbus, Ohio	2004	
ACME Comedy Theatre	Professional	Theatresports	Los Angeles, California	1989	
Baltimore Improv Group	Professional	Multiple	Baltimore, Maryland	2004	
The Annoyance Theatre	Professional	Improvisational	Chicago, Illinois	1987	
Bassprov	Professional	Long-form	Chicago	2000	
BATS Improv	Major Professional	Theatresports, Long-form, Musicals	San Francisco, California	1986	
The Bent Theatre	Professional	Multiple	Charlottesville, Virginia	2004	
Blackout Improv	Professional	-	Minneapolis, Minnesota	2015	
Bovine Metropolis Theater	Professional	Multiple	Denver, Colorado	1998	
The Brave New Workshop Comedy Theatre	Professional	Multiple	Minneapolis, Minnesota	1958	
Chicago City Limits	Major Professional	Shortform	New York City, New York	1977	
Comedy Arts Theater of Charlotte	Professional	Longform	Charlotte, NC	2016	
ComedySportz	Major Professional	Shortform	Milwaukee, Wisconsin	1984	
Compass Players	Professional	Cabaret	Chicago, Illinois	1955*	
Complete Theater Company	Professional	Improvisational	Manhattan, New York	2009	
Curious Comedy Theater	Professional	Multiple	Portland, Oregon	2008	
Dad's Garage Theatre Company	Professional	Multiple	Atlanta, Georgia	1995	
Dead Parrot's Society	Collegiate	Multiple	Bellingham, Washington	1998	
The Diggers	Professional	Guerrilla	San Francisco, California	1966*	
Erasable Inc.	Collegiate	Improvisational	College Park, Maryland	1986	
Face Off Unlimited	Professional	Multiple	New York City, New York	2003	
Flipside Theatre	Professional	Multiple	Superior, CO	2019	
The Focus Group	Professional	Long-form	Bangor, Maine	2009	
Friday Night Improvs	Collegiate	Improv Jam	Pittsburgh, Pennsylvania	1989	
The Groundlings	Major Professional	Semi-improvisational	Los Angeles, California	1974	
Highwire Improv	Professional	Multiple	Baltimore, Maryland	2020	
HUGE Theater	Professional	Long-form	Minneapolis, Minnesota	2005	
The Immediate Gratification Players	Collegiate	Long-form	Cambridge, Massachusetts	1986	
ImprovOlympic	Major Professional	the Harold	Chicago, Illinois	1980	
Improvolution	Professional		New York City, New York	2002	
Improv Asylum	Major Professional	Semi-improvisational	Boston, Massachusetts	1998	
ImprovBoston	Major Professional	Multiple	Cambridge, Massachusetts	1982	
Improv Everywhere	Professional	Guerrilla	New York City, New York	2001	
Improv for the People	Professional	Multiple	Los Angeles, California	2009	
Improv Institute	Professional	Improvisational	Chicago, Illinois	1983*	
Jet City Improv	Professional	Multiple	Seattle, Washington	1992	
Just Add Water	Collegiate	Improvisational	New Haven, Connecticut	1986	
Laughing Matters	Professional	Shortform	Atlanta, Georgia	1985	
The Lobby	Professional	Shortform	Fullerton, California	2005	
Madcap Theater	Professional	Shortform	Westminster, Colorado	2006	
Magnet Theater	Major Professional	Long-Form	New York City, New York	2005	
Monks' Night Out	Professional	Multiple	Austin, Texas	1994*	
Mopco / The Mop and Bucket Company	Professional	Multiple	Schenectady, New York	1995	
The N Crowd	Professional	Shortform	Philadelphia, Pennsylvania	2005	
The National Comedy Theatre	Major Professional	Shortform	San Diego, California		
On Thin Ice	Collegiate	Shortform	Cambridge, Massachusetts	1984	
Peoples Improv Theater	Major Professional	Multiple	New York City, New York	2002	
Philly Improv Theater (PHIT)	Major Professional	Multiple	Philadelphia, Pennsylvania	2005*	
The Playground	Professional	Long-form	Chicago, Illinois	1997	
Providence Improv Guild	Professional	Multiple	Providence, Rhode Island	2013	
PseudoRandomNoise Improv Theater	Professional	Multiple and show-based	Temecula, California	2010	
The Purple Crayon of Yale	Collegiate	Long-form	New Haven, Connecticut	1985	
SAK Comedy Lab	Major Professional	Multiple	Orlando, Florida	1991	
The San Francisco Improv Alliance	Professional	Multiple	San Francisco, California	2005	
The Second City	Major Professional	Semi-improvisational	Chicago, Illinois	1959	
Second Nature Improv	Collegiate	Long-form	Los Angeles, California	2002	
Starla and Sons	Collegiate	Longform	Providence, Rhode Island	2006	
Stevie Rays Comedy	Professional	Multiple	Chanhassen, Minnesota	1988	
Theatre Strike Force	Collegiate	Multiple	Gainesville, Florida	1989	
The Home Comedy Theater	Professional	The Harold	Chicago, Illinois	2024	
The National Comedy Theatre	Professional	Multiple	Phoenix, Arizona	2007	
Unexpected Company	Professional	Long-form	Warwick, Rhode Island	2003	
Unexpected Productions	Professional	Theatresports, Long-form	Seattle, Washington	1983	
Under the Gun Theater	Professional	Multiple	Chicago, Illinois	2014	
The Upfront Theatre	Professional	Multiple	Bellingham, Washington	2004	
The Un-Scripted Theater Company	Professional	Multiple	San Francisco, California	2002	
Upright Citizens Brigade	Major Professional	Multiple	New York City, New York	1999	
Washington Improv Theater	Professional	Longform	Washington, DC	1998	
Whole World Theatre	Professional	Shortform	Atlanta, Georgia	1994	
Wing-It Productions	Professional	Multiple	Seattle, Washington	1992	
The Yale Ex!t Players	Collegiate	Short-form	New Haven, Connecticut	1984	

*This group is no longer performing.

== Improvisational theatre companies in the United Kingdom ==
Name	Group Level	Improv Type	Location	Date Established	Reference
TBC Improv UK	Professional	Multiple	Edinburgh, Scotland	2009	
Bristol Improv Theatre	Professional	Multiple	Bristol, England	2012	
The Comedy Store Players	Professional	Improvisational	London, England	1985	
Improverts	Collegiate	Theatresports	Edinburgh, Scotland	1989	
Hoopla Impro	Professional	Multiple	London, England	2005	
The Free Association	Professional	Long-form	London	2014	
The Oxford Imps	Semi-Professional	Improvisational	Oxford, England	2003	
Showstoppers	Professional	Musical Theatre	London, England	2008	
The Suggestibles	Professional	Improvisational	Newcastle upon Tyne, England	2001	
The Spontaneity Shop	Professional	Multiple	London, England	1996	
The Antics	Collegiate	Shortform	Sheffield, England	2008	
The Maydays	Professional	Longform	Brighton, England	2003	
Austentatious	Professional	Longform	London, England	2011	
Mischief Theatre	Professional	Multiple	London, England	2008	
Blanche Improv	Professional	Multiple	London, England	2023	
Shoot From The Hip	Professional	Multiple	London, England	2011	

== Improvisational theatre companies in Asia ==
Name	Group Level	Improv Type	Location	Date Established	Language	Reference
Pirates of Tokyo Bay	Semi-Professional	Shortform	Tokyo, Japan	2010	English & Japanese	
Tokyo Comedy Store	Professional	Multiple	Tokyo, Japan	1994		
Seoul City Improv	Professional	Multiple	Seoul, South Korea	2007		
TBC Improv HK	Professional	Multiple	Hong Kong	2014	English	
The Improv Company	Professional	Multiple	Singapore	2013		
Beijing Improv	Semi-Professional	Multiple	Beijing, China	-	English	
Zmack	Semi-Professional	Multiple	Shanghai, China	2009	English, Chinese	

*This group is no longer performing.

== Improvisational theatre companies in other regions ==
Name	Group Level	Improv Type	Location	Date Established	Reference
TBC Improv Spain	Professional	Multiple	Barcelona, Spain	2023	
L'Om Imprebis	Professional	Multiple	Valencia, Spain		
ImproMadrid	Professional	Multiple	Madrid, Spain		
Jamming	Professional	Multiple	Madrid, Spain		
Teatro Indigesto	Professional	Multiple	Zaragoza, Spain		
Impro Impar	Professional	Multiple	Madrid, Spain		
Corta el Cable Rojo	Professional	Shortform	Madrid, Spain		
Improv Bandits	Professional	Multiple	Auckland, New Zealand	1997	
Improv Comedy Copenhagen	Professional	Multiple	Copenhagen, Denmark	2014	
The Court Jesters	Professional	Multiple	Christchurch, New Zealand	1989	
Wellington Improvisation Troupe	Professional	Multiple	Wellington, New Zealand	2004	
Boom Chicago	Professional	Multiple	Amsterdam, Netherlands	1993	
IGLU Theatre	Professional	Multiple	Ljubljana, Slovenia	2013	
Narobov	Professional	Theatresports	Ljubljana, Slovenia	2004	
Jokebox	Professional	Multiple	Athens, Greece	2024	
theLenormans	Semi-Professional	Shortform	Athens, Greece	2024	

== See also ==
- Commedia dell'arte
- List of comedians
- List of improvisational theater festivals
