= Starla and Sons =

Starla and Sons is a longform improv comedy group at Brown University in Providence, Rhode Island. The group was formed with five members in the fall of 2006. It is the second longform group in the university's history, and has performed about twice a month since its inception. The group currently has seven members, and performs fast-paced traditional longform forms like the Harold, Deconstruction, and Monoscene, as well as its own invention, the Starla.

In 2008, Starla and Sons hosted the first annual College Hill Longform Improv Festival (CHLIF), a 24-hour continual longform improv performance. Eleven college and professional groups, including ImprovBoston and Unexpected Company, performed in the festival.

Starla and Sons also performed at the 15th Annual Del Close Marathon at the UCB Theater in New York City.

In 2009, Starla and Sons were implicated in the controversy surrounding Serger the Russian horse and his alleged involvement in the death of his mother. No members were officially convicted of a crime.

== See also ==
- Improvisational theatre
- List of improvisational theatre companies
