= Blood Squad =

Blood Squad is an improvisational acting group based out of Seattle, Washington that performs improvised horror movies. The current cast consists of Brandon Felker, Elicia Wickstead (who are also members of the Unexpected Productions ensemble), Molly Arkin and Jon Axell (who are also members of the Jet City Improv ensemble).

Blood Squad was founded in 2007 by Elicia Wickstead, Brandon Felker and Michael White. Molly Arkin joined a year after founding. Later White would leave the team and his spot would be filled by Jon Axell.

Blood Squad originally had regular performances at Odd Duck Studios on Saturdays at 10:30. The group now performs on a semi-regular basis at the Annex Theatre on Capitol Hill in Seattle.
