= Seoul City Improv =

Theater company in Seoul, South Korea

- SCI
- Address: 17-6, Hangang-Daero 48-Gil, Yongsan-Gu; Seoul; South Korea
- Current use: Improvisational comedy Sketch comedy Comedic plays

Construction
- Opened: 2007

Website
- seoulcityimprov.com

Seoul City Improv (SCI) is a theater company and improvisational comedy troupe located in Seoul, South Korea. Founded in 2007, in Seoul's Itaewon neighborhood by an international group of actors and creatives it's known to be Korea's oldest English-language improv group and has since grown to perform all around the world, including Taiwan, Tokyo, Hong Kong, USA, Canada and more.

== History ==
Seoul City Improv was founded in 2007 by actress Margaret Whittum as an outlet for performers of theater group Seoul Players who, at the time, had only two performance opportunities a year. Their shows first began with short-form improv games, influenced by the show Whose Line Is It Anyway? (U.S. TV series), but has since grown to incorporate various long-form and musical improv formats.

SCI's first international debut would be in April 2010 with a collaborative show in Taichung, Taiwan with Taichung Improv and would follow that up in Tokyo, Japan with a showing at the Tokyo Improv Festival.

In April 2011, Seoul City Improv took part in the International Interactive Arts Festival in Beijing, a five-day event where it was mentioned as a “talent from across Asia” by Time Out Beijing. In May of that year, SCI would go on to host the Seoul International Improv Festival featuring performers from the US, China, Hong Kong, and more.

Seoul City Improv would later collaborate with the Korea Improv Theater to host South Korea's first English-language Theatresports performance.

In March 2016, Seoul City Improv was named one of the best expat performing groups by 10 Magazine (South Korean magazine). The next year, Seoul City Improv would find itself performing in Shanghai for the Shanghai Improv Festival, as well as being featured in the Busan International Comedy Festival.

They offered their first eight-week introductory improv courses in mid-2018.

Currently, Seoul City Improv's events are located in The Funtastic Theater located near Samgakji station.

== See also ==
- Itaewon
- List of improvisational theatre companies
