= The N Crowd =

Improv comedy troupe

The N Crowd is a short-form improv comedy troupe that has performed weekly since April 2005 in Philadelphia. The troupe has received positive reviews in Philadelphia Weekly, Philly Style Magazine, and The City Paper. Interviews with N Crowd members have appeared in The Philly Metro and Phillyst.com.

== Formation Of The Troupe ==
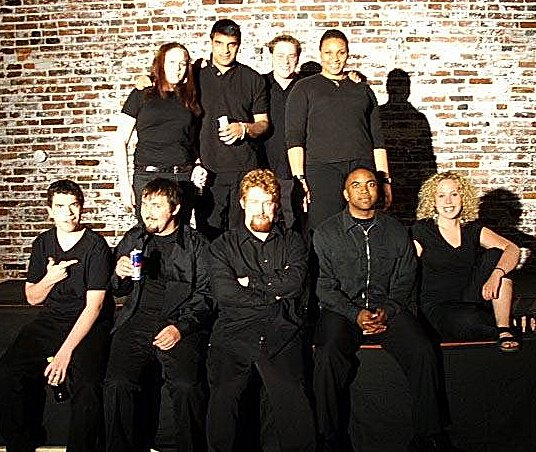
The N Crowd 2005 Top Row: Jessica Snow, Akshay Sateesh, Brandon Libby, Kennedy Allen Bottom: Steve Cohen, Mike Connor, B.J. Ellis, Ray Reese, Jackie Danziger

In February 2005 Ray Reese and Emily Dufton held auditions to form a new improv comedy troupe, The N Crowd. Originally there were 14 performers cast in the group. However, after 2 months of rehearsal, the cast slimmed down to 9 cast members. They included Jessica Snow, Akshay Sateesh, Brandon Libby, Kennedy Allen, Steve Cohen, Mike Connor, B.J. Ellis, Ray Reese, and Jackie Danziger.

Performances were first held in April 2005 at a martial arts studio located at 213 North 3rd Street in the Old City part of Philadelphia, PA. On an irregular basis, special guests would open up the show. These included other improv groups in Philadelphia or even musical guests. The N Crowd performed on a raised wooden stage hand-built by members of the troupe. The stage would be disassembled into four parts every week and stored until the following week.

During The N Crowd's run at this location, the troupe performed at Fergies Pub, The Troc, and several fundraisers, and also participated in the 2005 Philadelphia Fringe Festival. They also were the first troupe to perform at the 1st annual Philadelphia Improv Festival. Because of the troupe's unusually large size compared to other troupes in the city, the troupe was able to do “Split Shows.” Half would perform one show somewhere while the other half would simultaneously perform another show at another location.

== Society Hill Playhouse ==
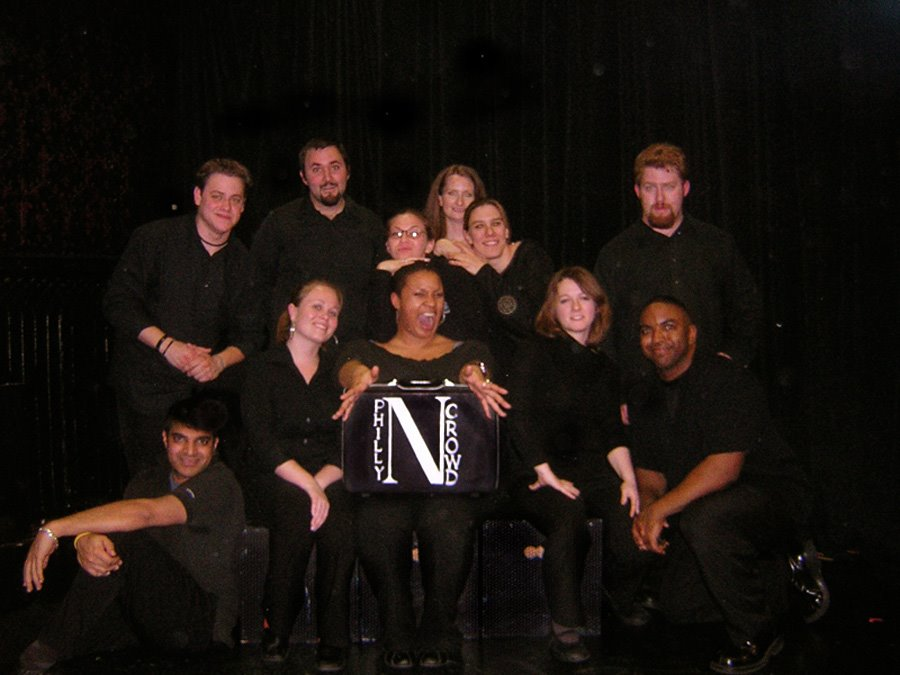
The N Crowd April 2006. Top Row: Brandon Libby, Mike Connor, Natalie Sandone, Valrie Dupont, Jana N., B.J. Ellis Bottom: Akshay Sateesh, Jessica Snow, Kennedy Allen, Kristen Schier, Ray Reese

In October 2005, The N Crowd wrapped up its run at 213 New Street. After its now annual Halloween Show, the troupe turned off the lights for the last time at this location. Shows then shifted to the Society Hill Playhouse in the Society Hill section of Philadelphia. Unlike the previous location, this performance space had a lighting system, a permanent stage, a box office, and a small dressing room.

During The N Crowd's run at this location, the troupe marked an important milestone. It celebrated its one-year anniversary to a packed house in April 2006. Also during this time a series of regular special guests including The Rare Bird Show, Hypnotoad, ZombieShark, and Industrial Improv. Shows continued to have increased audiences, be it slow. Unfortunately during this time, shows needed to be moved from Fridays to Thursdays. This became a constant struggle as Thursdays were not exactly the prime time for entertainment in Philadelphia.

== The Actors Center ==
In July 2006, The N Crowd was a featured article in the Philadelphia Style magazine and took 1st runner up in their “Best of Style” contest for that year. (Best Comedy Club and Best Theater Group.) In the article, The N Crowd was quoted to be “Philadelphia’s premiere improv troupe.” As a result of publication of that article, the troupe began to perform at various colleges, fundraising, and other events. Also in July, The N Crowd ended its run at Society Hill Playhouse and moved to perform at The Actors Center, located at 257 N. 3rd Street.

Two important and fundamental changes occurred with The N Crowd. Shows at The Actors Center returned to Friday nights and the troupe developed a system of online ticket ordering utilizing Google Checkout. Since August 2006, The N Crowd has had over a dozen sold-out shows and has performed several “Double Features” with two shows being performed in one night. During this open end run of shows at The Actors Center, the troupe celebrated two more important milestones in early 2007: their 100th performance and their 2-year anniversary. Since then The N Crowd has continued to have steady crowds. In August 2007, The N Crowd marked 12 months of shows at The Actors Center making it the longest running N Crowd venue since their founding. In an article by the Philadelphia MetroThe N Crowd has been keeping "Philly funny" and "following improv wherever it leads." With a small picture of The N Crowd on the front page, this marked the first time the troupe has made the front page of a major city newspaper. Starting in August 2007, The N Crowd returned to the Philly Fringe Festival. This marked their second appearance in the festival and has resulted in mentions in Fringe write ups for The Philadelphia Inquirer and the Philadelphia City Paper. Their biggest press coverage for their participation in the Fringe Festival came from the Pottstown Mercury with a full page color photo, a 2-page article, and two additional photos. The article highlighted The N Crowd's participation in the Philly Fringe as well as several other shows in the festival. It also connected locally to Pottstown by featuring member B.J. Ellis, who is from the Pottstown. The article interviewed him on what improv involved mentally and physically while giving some tidbits about The N Crowd in general.

== Types of Shows ==
In any given week, The N Crowd has the following types of shows.

=== Regular Weekly Show ===
The most common type of show is a regular weekly show that takes place on Fridays. These shows generally last 90 minutes with no intermission. Up to 18 different improv games are played with six to ten members of The N Crowd. Most shows end with the games A Day in The Life, Super Freeze, or Anti-Freeze.

=== Double Features ===
These shows are commonly held on First Friday in Philadelphia. First Friday has grown to be a large monthly event in the area. Art galleries and other stores often have sales and extended hours. On these nights The N Crowd performs two 90 minute shows. Typically these shows are at 8 p.m. and at 10 p.m. Currently, these Double Features are on an irregular schedule, however plans are in the works to make them a regular monthly feature.

=== Special Guest Shows ===
Occasionally The N Crowd will invite other improv troupes or stand-up comedians to open up the show. These shows are still typically 90 minutes in length. The special guest will perform for about 30 minutes, while The N Crowd will perform for 60 minutes.

Special guests have included performers from Philly Improv Theater and:

- The Rare Bird Show
- Industrial Improv
- The Ninjas
- Lunch Lady Doris
- Zombie Shark
- The Throng
- Whipsuit
- Holmes/Maughan
- Men About Town
- Hypnotoad

=== Double Special Guest Shows ===
As the name implies, there are two special guests for these shows. Each special guest and The N Crowd perform for 30 minutes.

=== Satellite Shows ===
These shows take place outside the regularly scheduled N Crowd shows. Their length is anywhere from 20 minutes to a full 90-minute show. These shows are typically held in bars, colleges, fundraisers, or as entertainment for conferences.

== See also ==
- Improvisational theatre
- List of improvisational theatre companies
