= Laura Norton =

English actress

- Born: 19 June 1983 (age 42); Hazlerigg, Newcastle upon Tyne, England
- Occupation: Actress
- Spouse: Mark Jordon (2015–present)
- Children: 2

Laura Norton (born 19 June 1983) is an English actress, known for her role as Kerry Wyatt on the ITV soap opera Emmerdale. Norton has also appeared in numerous television series working for ITV and the BBC, and has significant theatre credits, including The Royal Shakespeare Company and the Live Theatre Company.

== Early life ==
Norton was born on 19 June 1983 in Newcastle upon Tyne. She attended Seaton Burn Community High School.

== Career ==
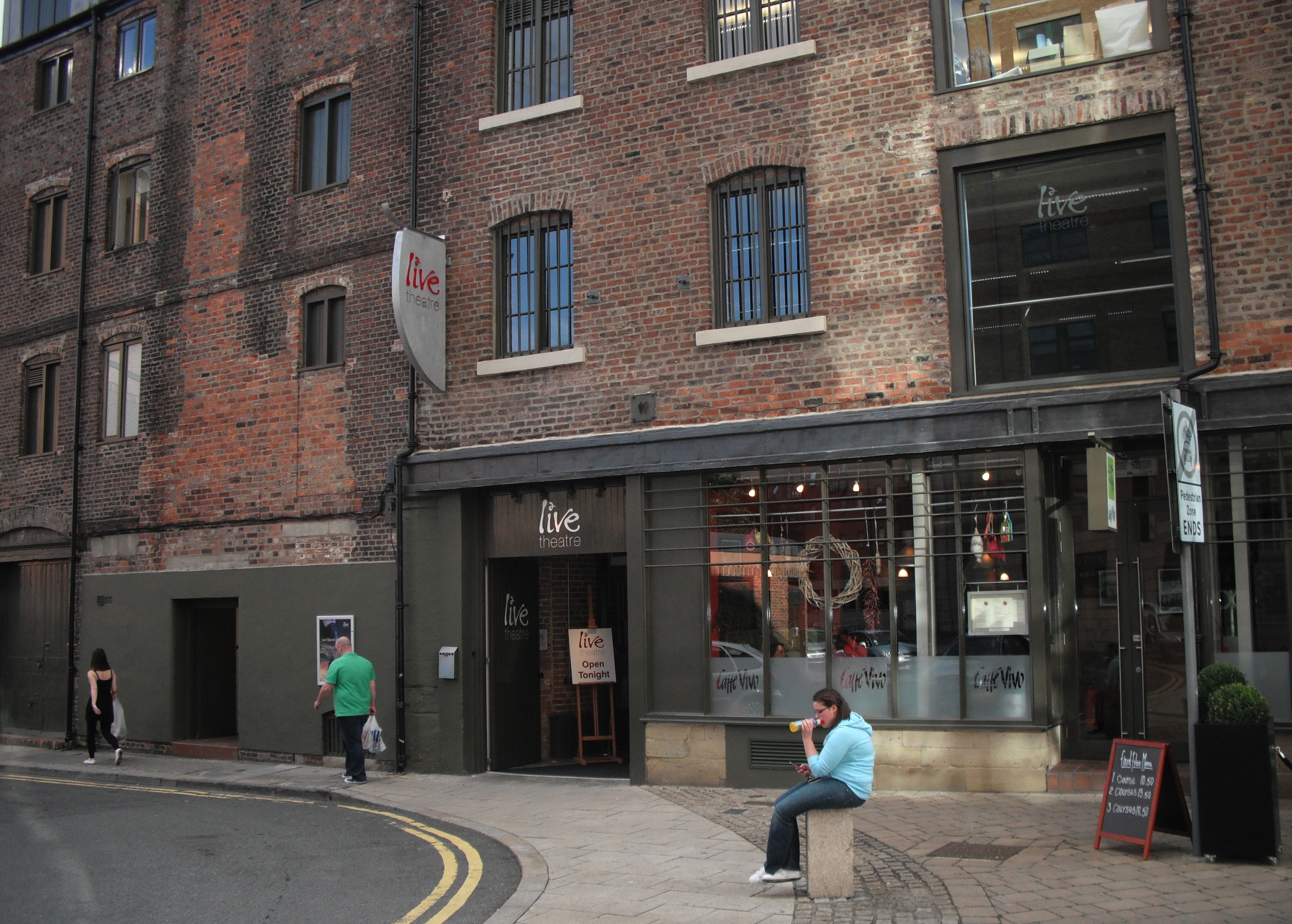
Norton began her career at the Live Theatre on Newcastle's Quayside, where she has subsequently appeared in many productions.

Norton began her acting career at the age of fourteen with a youth theatre project with Live Theatre in Newcastle. Norton auditioned for the opening play of the project called Get Out of That Then. She continued to work with the youth theatre until she was 19. It was there that Paul James, the actor and associate director for education and participation at the Live Theatre in Newcastle, got Norton her first professional audition for a television series called Badger; Norton booked the role. Wanting to pursue an acting career, she undertook a BTEC and HND performing arts courses at North Tyneside College.

Norton returned to the Live Theatre youth project when she was 21 years old, after completing her performing arts courses at North Tyneside College. It would be with the theatre that she would earn her first major stage role. The Royal Shakespeare Company in partnership with the Live Theatre, Newcastle, collaborated on a project called Keepers of the Flame. Norton booked a role with the production, portraying Lisa in Keepers of the Flame. Before she undertook her role in 2003, Norton discussed booking her first major professional stage role, "I cried when I was told I had got through the audition. I still can't believe it. It really is a dream come true. Lisa's the one who brings lightness to the play. She's quite humorous - the only character who there's a bit of hope for. Am I like her at all? Well, I can be feisty sometimes!" Building upon her first professional stage role, Norton booked a role in Live Theatre's production Smack Family Robinson. A tale of a family of drug dealers, she played the youngest daughter, Cora. Alfred Hickling of The Guardian commented on Norton's performance: "Laura Norton is quietly outstanding as the younger daughter Cora." In 2004, she also took part in A City on the Tyne at the Live Theatre, a celebration of local writer Sid Chaplin. Norton read extracts from one of Chaplin's works, Grace Before Meat. From 27 November to 23 December 2004, Norton appeared as Pepita, in The Weather Kitchen at the Chelsea Theatre London.

In 2004, Norton played small roles as Geordie Girl in 55 Degrees North and Susie in Steel River Blues. Norton also worked as an extra on Byker Grove before she was cast as Sam, a local journalist. Roles in Angel Cake, The Royal Today and Vera followed. Norton also featured in Hoops, a short feature sitcom as part of collaboration with Newcastle-based comedy improvisational group, The Suggestibles. Also in 2004, she appeared as Charity Girl in Paul Gilbert's Would You Like to Meet. She also featured in Dene Film's Apple Crush as Beatrice and in Aggro, a short for Shakabuku Films.

After two years away from the stage, Norton returned, booking a role as Sharon in Writing Wrong at The Customs House, South Shields as part of the theatre's February Drama Festival in 2006. She then appeared in New Writing North's production of Immaculate Deception. In 2007, Norton returned to the Customs House to take her first foray into Pantomime. Starring as Princess Jill in Jack and the Beanstalk alongside David Ducasse and Victoria Elliot. In 2008, she appeared at the Northern Stage (formerly Newcastle Playhouse) as Blackie the Cat in Hansel and Gretel. In 2009, Norton appeared in You Couldn't Make It Up, "A fascinating and satirical look at the recent media circus surrounding the trials and tribulations of The Toon Army." In the same year, Norton appeared at the Customs House in Lucky Numbers a comedy by playwright Mike Yeaman. She played the role of a Goth. In 2009, Norton portrayed the role of Dara, a "20 something good time girl" in the Live Theatre's production of Jump.

In 2010, Norton also booked a role as Carol, a businesswoman, in Canoeing For Beginners. Carol was in a desperate search for her father Frank, who faked his own death and subsequently tracks him down in Cuba to find out the truth. She earned good reviews for her performances with one reviewer calling her performance "superb". The production was performed at the Customs House, South Shields. Also in 2010, Norton booked a role in A Nightingale Sang portraying the role of Helen. The production toured the North of England and was performed at the Oldham Coliseum Theatre and at the Stephen Joseph Theatre Scarborough in early 2010. Commenting on A Nightingale Sang, What's on Stage's Malcolm Wallace praised Norton's portrayal of Helen, saying "Norton takes a while to warm up, but as the evening progresses and the character develops, her performance grows and her final scenes with Jack Bennett, who excellently plays Helen's lover Norman, are dignified and poignant."

Also in 2010, Norton portrayed the role of lap dancer Carla in Faith & Cold Reading opposite Stephen Tompkinson. She earned positive reviews for her role in Faith & Cold Reading. Chris Collett of The Stage magazine commented, she was "restrained yet, heart-rending performance as Carla, Sammy's world weary girlfriend." Over the course of rehearsing Faith & Cold Reading, Norton also kept a blog on Live Theatre's website. She spoke of the privilege she felt working on the production and the "surreal" nature of working with Stephen Tompkinson. Reviewers commented that she and Tompkinson shared a good on stage rapport and her performance was compelling. Norton also appeared as Chelle a young woman in her 20s, in Nativities. She again earned critical acclaim for her role as Chelle, with Paul Clifford of the Shields Gazette giving her a positive review. "Laura Norton did a fine job as Chelle, a young mum who would rather go out and get drunk than look after her child." Speaking about the production with co-star Melanie Hill, Norton stated that the characters in the play were "extreme" and all "interweaved into each others lives". Delving into her character, she explained Chelle's journey, "She has had a baby really young, has got trapped in this life she does not want to be in. She's really bitter and regretful, mourning for the life she has lost. She feels her life has been taken away from her and that's why she gets her claws into this young lass, whose life she wants. She is vile."

In 2011, at the Live Theatre, Norton appeared alongside actor Mark Benton and Joe Caffrey in Jesting About. "A collaborative project between the BBC and Northern Film and Media (NFM), aimed at unearthing new laugh-making talent" within the North East. The 30-minute comedy sketch show was also broadcast on BBC Radio Newcastle on 2 May 2011. In 2012, Norton appeared alongside Bev Fox (co-founder), Paula Penman and Jayne Humphreys in partnership with Newcastle-based improvisational group The Suggestibles, at the Newcastle Pride Festival 2012. She performed comedy sketches in the Women's tent as part of the Pride festival.

Early in 2012, Norton also appeared in I'm Sorry – Present:Tense with Nabakov, a play based around a specific topic effecting the local area of Newcastle. After development of the idea a theme was selected after it featured heavily in the Evening Chronicle. It was announced that the series of plays would focus on "How Government cuts are disproportionally affecting women." Alongside James Baxter and Chloe Allen, Norton was selected to feature in the week-long project under the directorship of Phil Ormrod.

On 8 October 2012, she also appeared on the CBBC television series Wolfblood as Sergeant Ashford. Later in 2012, it was announced that Norton would be joining the Yorkshire-based soap opera Emmerdale as Kerry Wyatt, the estranged mother of Amy Wyatt (Chelsea Halfpenny). Emmerdale marked Norton's first regular television role and she made her first appearance on 17 July 2012. Norton has subsequently added that she feels Kerry is vulnerable and complicated, saying: "She's complicated, vulnerable and childlike. You come to see pretty quickly that Amy is the grown-up one and Kerry is complicated and damaged. She's just desperate for some love. She wants a relationship. She felt that she was doing everything she could to keep Amy [when she was young]. Really, she made some terrible decisions that weren't right at all." Norton was nominated for Best Newcomer at the 2013 British Soap Awards.

On 23 February 2013, Norton returned to the Live Theatre in Newcastle in White Rabbit, Red Rabbit, a play written by Iranian Nassim Soleimanpour. She performed the production alone, without even seeing the script beforehand, on a simplified set and without direction.

== Personal life ==
Norton is married to former Emmerdale co-star Mark Jordon. On 24 August 2020, the couple announced that they are expecting their first child, due in January 2021. On 29 January 2021, she gave birth to a son.

On 9 February 2013, Norton showed her support for a campaign to prevent the closure of libraries in the Newcastle area. Norton read scenes from We love you, Arthur and also a monologue about dementia. Norton was joined by Emmerdale colleagues, Chelsea Halfpenny and Charlie Hardwick.

== Credits ==
Year	Title	Role	Notes
1999–2000	Badger	?	first Television role
2003	Keepers of the Flame	Lisa	Part of Royal Shakespeare Company touring production and first professional Theatre Role, at Live Theatre Newcastle
2003	Smack Family Robinson	Cora	
2004	A city on The Tyne	Herself	Read extracts of Sid Chaplin story Grace Before Meat
2004	55 Degrees North	Geordie Girl	Appeared in one scene only
2004	Byker Grove	Sam	Played Sam a local journalist covering a teenage pregnancy at the grove.
2004	Steel River Blues	Susie	Played a woman rescued by local firefighters
2006	Angel Cake	Izzie	
2006	Writing Wrong	Sharon	
2007–2008	Jack and the Beanstalk	Princess Jill	Pantomime role
2008	The Royal Today	Ella	played Ella a young woman whose breast surgery has gone wrong
2008	Lucky Numbers	?	Theatre role at the Customs House South Shields
2008	Hansel and Gretel	Blackie The Cat	Theatre Role, at The Northern Stage (formerly Newcastle Playhouse)
2009	Hoops	Julie	Short sitcom, entitled "Come Dine with Me"
2009	You Couldn't Make It Up	>?	Theatre Role, at Live Theatre Newcastle
2009	Jump	Dara	Theatre Role, at Live Theatre Newcastle
2010	Canoeing For Beginners	Carol	Theatre Role at The Customs House, South Shields
2010	A Nightingale Sang	Helen	Touring theatre Role, at the Oldham Coliseum Theatre and Scarborough's Stephen Joseph Theatre
2011	Faith and Cold Reading	Carla	Theatre Role, at Live Theatre Newcastle
2011	Jesting About	Various	BBC & Northern Film Media Radio Comedy show broadcast on BBC Radio Newcastle
2011	Vera	Margaret Wilde	Played a murder victim
2012	Nabakov Present: Tense	?	Theatre Role, at Live Theatre Newcastle
2012	Natives	Chelle	Theatre Role, at Live Theatre Newcastle
2012	Wolfblood	Sergeant Ashford	Episode: "A Quiet Night In"
2012–present	Emmerdale	Kerry Wyatt	Series regular
2012	Tested	Melanie	Film currently in post-production
2013	White Rabbit, Red Rabbit	Unknown	solo play at the Live Theater
2024	Drama Queens	Herself	Upcoming series

== Awards and nominations ==
Year	Award	Category	Result	Ref.
2013	British Soap Awards	Best Newcomer	Nominated	
2013	TV Choice Awards	Best Soap Newcomer	Shortlisted	
2013	Inside Soap Awards	Funniest Female	Shortlisted	
2013	Inside Soap Awards	Best Newcomer	Shortlisted	
2014	British Soap Awards	Best Comedy Performance	Nominated	
2014	Inside Soap Awards	Funniest Female	Won	
2015	British Soap Awards	Best Comedy Performance	Nominated	
2015	Inside Soap Awards	Funniest Female	Shortlisted	
2016	Inside Soap Awards	Funniest Female	Shortlisted	
2017	Inside Soap Awards	Funniest Female	Nominated	
