= IGLU Theatre =

- Genre: improvisational theatre
- Date of premiere: 2013
- Location: Ljubljana, Slovenia
- Official website

IGLU Theatre (based on the Slovene acronym Impro Gledališče Ljubljana) is a Slovenian improvisational theatre, located in Ljubljana, capital city of Slovenia, and founded by younger generation of impro performers Vid Sodnik, Juš Milčinski, and Peter Frankl Jr. Participating in the most notable theatresports championship in Slovenia, Impro League, they have won it four times as members of various teams and hold numerous titles for the best improviser in Slovenia. As a team they were also winners of the Impro League 2013/14 season. They are members of European impro association Ohana.

== International tour ==
IGLU Theatre has been on international tour in 2014, that included Switzerland, Germany, Belgium, Austria, Netherlands in Czech Republic, where the troupe performed and also held courses in improvisational theatre skills and formats.

== International competition ==
IGLU Theatre was invited to 2014 The St. Valentine’s Day Massacre Tournament organized by Vancouver Theatresports League in Canada, and competed with internationally recognized troupes from Toronto, Portland, Austin, and Edmonton.

== Maestro ==
The Maestro competition, a format invented by Keith Johnstone and licensed by Loose Moose Theatre, has been organized once per month in Ljubljana BTC City Theatre by IGLU Theatre in cooperation with Impro League since the 2014/15 season.

== See also ==
- List of improvisational theatre companies
