= Impro League =

Slovenian improv theater competition

Impro League (also Improvisation League; in Slovene: Impro liga) is the oldest among Slovenian theatresports championships. It has taken place since 1993 with participants from all over the country. In recent years, over hundred participants have competed in a number of disciplines in each season, culminating in finals. Other Slovenian championships that are limited to younger age groups, include School Impro League (ŠILA) for high school teams, while Impro club is dedicated to regular Slovenian performers who have international impro experience with mentors, such as Daniel Gray Goldstein from the Upright Citizens Brigade Theatre, New York City; Randy Dixon from the Unexpected Productions, Seattle, and Andreas Wolf from Munich, Germany.

== Finals Venues ==
In its 17th incarnation the finals occurred at the Ljubljana Slovene National Theatre Drama venue and since the 20th season they have been hosted by Spanish Fighters Culture Centre venue.

== Seasons ==
=== 1993–2004 ===
In early 1990s, the concept of theatresports was introduced in Slovenia by the Ana Monró Theatre, founded in 1980s as the first street theatre group in Titoist Yugoslavia. Nowadays well-known performers, including its co-founder Andrej Rozman – Roza, were among the participants in the league' early years.

=== Since 2005 ===
Since 2005, under Juš Milčinski management, 19 matches were organized throughout each season between the teams, with 80 participants in 2005/2006, fifteen teams in the 2006/2007 season, and 17 teams in the consequent two seasons.

Winning teams by season

| Season | First place | Second place |
|---|---|---|
| 1994/95 | Ana Monro Theatre | Radio Študent |
| 1995/96 | Pilots | Radio Student Team |
| 1996/97 | St.Jakob Theatre | Ana Monro Theatre |
| 1997/98 | Improvocateurs | St.Jakob Theatre |
| 1998/99 | Končno sprejeti | A-je-to |
| 1999/00 | Končno sprejeti | Dejmo stisn't impro |
| 2000/01 | Dupleška mornarica | Pilots |
| 2001/02 | Pilots | Ud Rudolfov |
| 2002/03 | Šterje pravi deci | Veselička |
| 2003/04 | Muci Buci | Veselička |
| 2005/06 | Modro nebo | Jajo je papajo |
| 2006/07 | Modro nebo | Veselička |
| 2007/08 | A ješ kavo, a veš kao... | Merlene Ottey Project |
| 2008/09 | Kuli Muli | Žahod Šever |
| 2009/10 | Kok Drago! | Estonija |
| 2010/11 | Fookiš | Stand up |
| 2011/12 | Športni impro klub Jastreb | Klasika |
| 2012/13 | Eki Paki Vamjevšeč | Šah mt |
| 2013/14 | IGLU Theatre | Ljudje |
| 2014/15 | Čarolija | Lastniki humorja |
| 2015/16 | Spranci na balanci | KIKS-men |
| 2015/16 | Wien-Beč-Dunaj-Kva | Poritiki, Žvali & KIKS-boks |
| 2017/18 | SNiG – Slovenian national improv theatre | Lastniki humorja |
