= Wellington Improvisation Troupe =

The Wellington Improvisation Troupe (WIT) is a not-for-profit, community-based improvisational theatre group in Wellington, New Zealand. It is run by a committee elected by and from its forty to sixty active members. WIT performs both long and short-form improvisation.

== History ==
The group was established by performers of the "Micetro" that won the New Zealand Fringe Festival Best Comedy Award in 2003. WIT was legally established and had its first committee formed in August 2003. The first show season performed under the name was the "Battle of WITs" in December 2003.

WIT continued to participate in the Fringe Festival and the New Zealand International Comedy Festival, and become licensed as an International Theatresports Institute group.

In 2008, WIT convened the first New Zealand Improv Festival, bringing together teachers and troupes from around New Zealand and Australia. The festival became an independent trust in 2015, though WIT opened for the festival that year.

== Philosophy ==
The creative philosophy of WIT is based on the teachings of Keith Johnstone, and several of WIT's senior players have traveled to Calgary to undertake training at Loose Moose Theatre, which Johnstone co-established in 1977. Beyond the foundation of Johnstone, they also take influence from others including Viola Spolin, Del Close, Augusto Boal, and companies such as The Second City.

WIT's specific objectives as listed in the incorporated society's founding document are as follows:

- "To promote, develop and foster the performance of improvised theatre and comedy in the Wellington region"
- "To teach the skills of improvised theatre and comedy through workshops, classes and any other means to members and to the wider Wellington community"
- "To encourage the having of fun and the not taking of oneself too seriously"

== Shows ==
Major WIT shows include:

- Micetro Improv, a licensed format where improvisers battle through rounds of elimination to become the "Micetro" for the night.
- Gorilla Theatre, a licensed format where four-five experienced improvisers compete as directors of scenes to take home a prize – the gorilla.
- The Attack of the Killer B-Movie, a narrated long form show that was presented in the Wellington, Nelson and Palmerston North Fringe Festivals, and ran as a fortnightly show for most of 2018.
- The Ferris Wheel, created by Wade Jackson, a show set entirely on a fairground ride
- Lovecrafted, debuted in the 2019 Fringe Festival, and is inspired by the works of H.P. Lovecraft, with the action moved to Wellington.
- The Improv Divas, which acted as a development group for female improvisors – ‘highly inventive’ (National Business Review).
- The All-New Old-Time Radio Show - the first improv theatre show in New Zealand to use sound as the principal medium for improvisation.
- The Young and the Witless - an improvised soap opera told over 6-8 episodes, ran for 7 seasons - "formidable and funny" (Theatreview).
- WIT-side Story - a long-form musical.

== See also ==
- List of improvisational theatre companies
