= Purple Crayon =

Improvisational theater group at Yale University

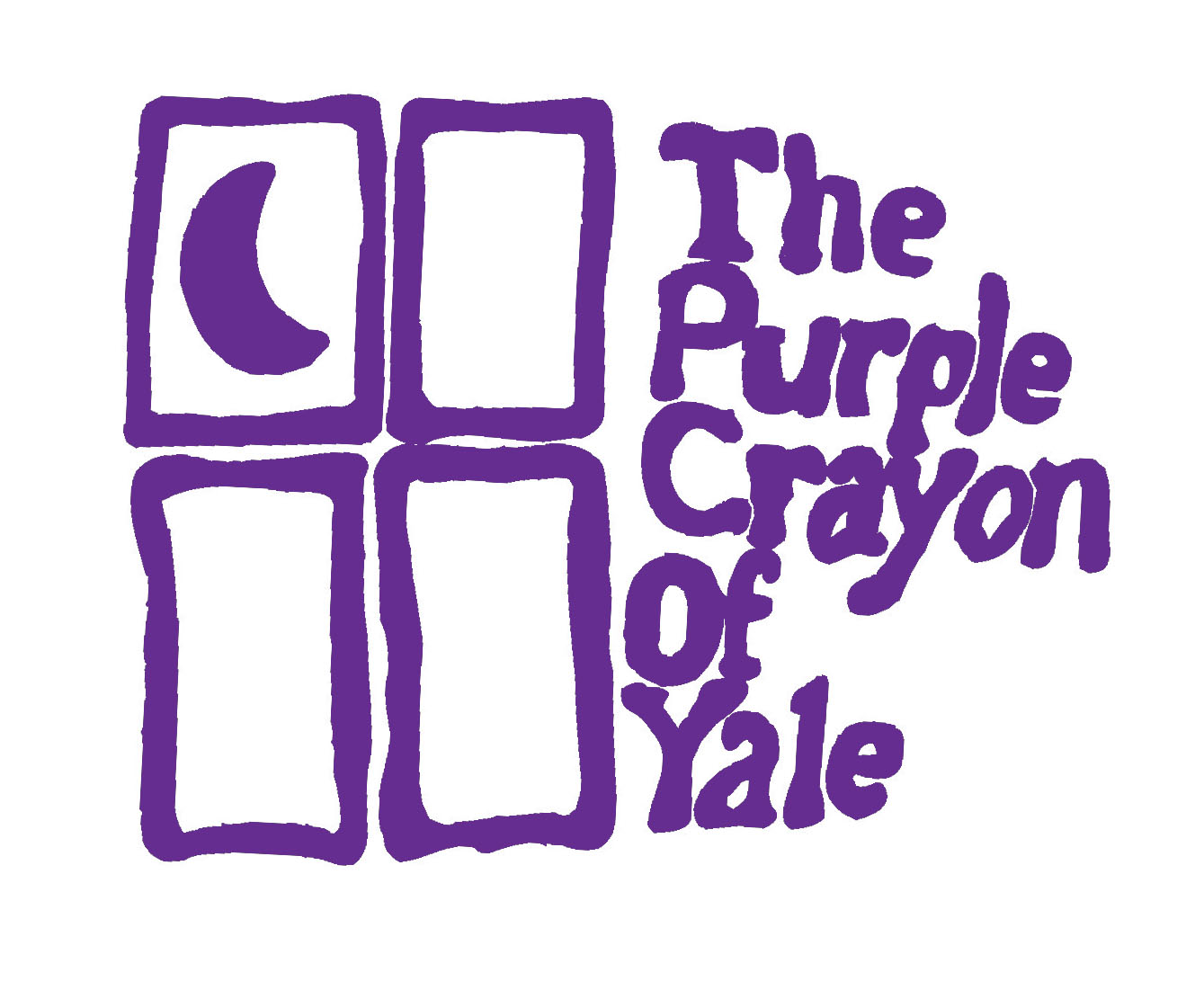
The Purple Crayon logo

The Purple Crayon of Yale, or the Purple Crayon, is an improvisational theater group at Yale University in New Haven, Connecticut, United States. The group specializes in longform improv, such as the Harold. The Purple Crayon is Yale's second-oldest improv group, after the Ex!t Players, and the oldest collegiate longform group in the country. The Purple Crayon currently consists of fifteen members, and is directed by Avery Misner '27 and Campbell Lazar '27.

The Purple Crayon was founded in 1985 by Eric Berg, class of 1987, and a bunch of theater friends, among them Ian Jacobs '87, and Adam Gross ‘88. Berg had taken a semester off during his sophomore year to act in a play at the Goodman Theater in Chicago, Illinois, where he also studied improv. There, he learned the Harold, a long-form improv format developed by Del Close and Charna Halpern. The group named itself after the popular children's book Harold and the Purple Crayon by Crockett Johnson, whose protagonist, Harold, uses a purple crayon to draw his imagination into reality. The original Purple Crayon had 13 founding members: Eric Berg, ‘87 Frances Barney, ‘89 David Baron, ‘87 Frank DeSantis, ‘88 Tom Dowe, ‘87 Leslie Goldman, ‘88 Adam Gross, ‘88 Liz Hutchinson, ‘88 Ian Jacobs, ‘87 Phil LaMarr, ‘88 Carla Power, ‘88 Jeffrey Stock, ‘88 John Sylvain, 87 Bliss Tobin, ‘86.

The group's current members are: Amara Neal '26, Prentiss Patrick-Carter '26, Amit Kamma '26, Mia Cortés Castro '26, Eddie Proffitt '26, Sui Yu '27, Miles Kirkpatrick '27, Campbell Lazar '27, Avery Misner '27, Nick Bhasin ‘27 Aaron Parr '28, Alice Kasdan '28, Shivraj Singh ‘28, Griffin Santopietro, Harry Lowitz ‘28, Alyssa Marvin ‘29, and Kitty Mathieu '29.

== Performances ==
The group performs several shows each year on campus, appears at various comedy festivals, performs at (usually local) events and locations, and tours each spring and fall. Performances mostly consist of one or two 25-minute Harold sets, though the group often experiments with various styles and forms.

Among the improvisation, theater, and comedy festivals in which The Purple Crayon has appeared are the National College Comedy Festival at Skidmore College, on and off since its inception in 1990 by 30 Rock producer David Miner; the Bellwether Improv Festival at Ohio State University; Brown University's College Hill Longform Improv Festival; the Slate Comedy Festival at The George Washington University; the Out of the Loop Festival at the WaterTower Theatre in Texas; and the annual Del Close Marathon run by the UCB Theatre in New York City.

In 2010 and 2011, the Crayon advanced to the finals of the East Coast Regionals of the College Improv Tournament, a national competition hosted by the Chicago Improv Festival, losing to Seriously Bent, Suffolk University's improv troupe, and the Otter Nonsense Players, Middlebury College's improv troupe.

== Alumni ==
- Phil LaMarr - actor.
- Greg Pak - film director and comic book writer.
- Alex Rubens - writer.
- Chris Rabb - politician and community organizer
- Ned Fulmer - internet personality
- Adam Gross - civic leader/policy expert.

== See also ==
- Yale University
- Improvisational Theater
