= Exit Players =

American improvisational comedy group

The Ex!t Players logo

The Yale Ex!t Players, or the Exit Players, is an improvisational comedy group at Yale University in New Haven, CT, United States. The Exit Players was founded in 1984, making it the oldest comedy group at Yale. It is also one of the oldest college improv groups in the country, older than any other improv group across the Ivy League schools. Official website.

== History ==
The Yale Ex!t Players was co-founded in 1984 by Paul Hayslett, ’85, and Steven Florsheim, ’87. It is Yale's oldest improv group, and Yale's oldest comedy troupe in general. The Exit Players derives its name from its original, longer title "Experimental Improvisational Theater," which was later shortened to "Exit" or "Ex!t." The exclamation point became part of the name when a new logo was designed for the group in 1988.

== Performances ==
The Exit Players perform both on the Yale University campus and across the country.

=== On-Campus Shows ===
The Exit Players perform every three to four weeks during the school term. Tickets to on-campus shows cost $2 or $3 until the late 2000s, after which they became free. Tickets typically sell out within a day of being released. Shows vary between annual themed shows and general non-themed shows, each averaging a little over an hour. Annual themed shows include:

- The Frexie Show, held during Yale's Family Visiting Weekend and spotlighting new cast members.
- The Yale-Harvard Show, held jointly with an improv group from Harvard before the Yale-Harvard football game.
- The Holiday Show, held in December
- The Valentine's Day Show, held on or around Valentine's Day.
- The Senior Show, showcasing the group's graduating seniors.

=== Off-Campus Shows ===
The Exit Players go on two tours to different locations around the world each year, once in the winter and once in the spring. On tour, the group performs shows and holds interactive workshops at a variety of venues, lasting anywhere from twenty minutes to four hours. Past tour locations include London, Jamaica, San Francisco, New Orleans, Los Angeles, New York City, Chicago, Montreal, and Washington, D.C.

The Exit Players have also participated in a number of comedy festivals and improv competitions.

== Form ==
The Exit Players perform a wide variety of long-form and short-form styles. In their shows, they have performed scene montages, Harolds, and even improvised one-act plays. They also experiment frequently with genre and structure, and in the past few years have performed improvised Clue-themed murder mysteries, Downton Abbey-esque upstairs-downstairs period dramas, shows entirely in the dark, a show based on paintings in an art museum, collaborative shows with other comedy troupes, etc.

Notably, the Exit Players also perform many original short-form games, developed by early members of the group, that are not performed anywhere else. Among these are perennial favorites such as Symphony of Social Criticisms, known to players and audiences as "Crit".

The Exit Players have trained with members of Improvised Shakespeare, Paralellogramophonograph, and Baby Wants Candy, as well as instructors from The Groundlings, the Peoples Improv Theater, iO Theater, the Upright Citizens Brigade, Brooklyn Comedy Collective, and Coldtowne Theater.

== Alumni ==
The Exit Players have many notable alumni, including:

- Claire Mulaney, '10 – writer, Saturday Night Live
- Alison Gates, '11 – head writer, Saturday Night Live
- Ted Cohen, '90, and Andrew Reich, '90 – executive producers, Friends
- David Litt, '08 – speechwriter to President Barack Obama and author of Thanks, Obama: My Hopey, Changey White House Years.
- Allison Silverman, '94 – executive producer, Unbreakable Kimmy Schmidt, The Colbert Report, writer, Late Night with Conan O'Brien, producer, The Daily Show
- Fran Kranz, '04 – actor, The Village, Dollhouse, The Cabin in the Woods
- Celeste Ballard, '08 – screenwriter, Do Revenge
- Seth Gordon, '98 – director, The King of Kong, Four Christmases, Horrible Bosses, episodes of Modern Family, The Office
- Matt Winston, '92 – actor, Little Miss Sunshine, Six Feet Under
- Stuart Blumberg, '91 – screenwriter, Keeping the Faith, The Girl Next Door, Fear Itself
