= Madcap Theater =

Improv comedy group (2006–2017)

Madcap Theater was a shortform improvisational comedy group located in Westminster, Colorado. Founded in 2006 by Russ Faillaci and Brian Harper, the group performed weekly improv shows and offered improv classes. In 2007, 2008, and 2009, it was voted Denver's best live comedy venue by ABC Channel 7. Madcap performed family-friendly, clean comedy.

The theater closed in 2017.

== See also ==
- Improvisational theatre
- List of improvisational theatre companies
