= The Un-Scripted Theater Company =

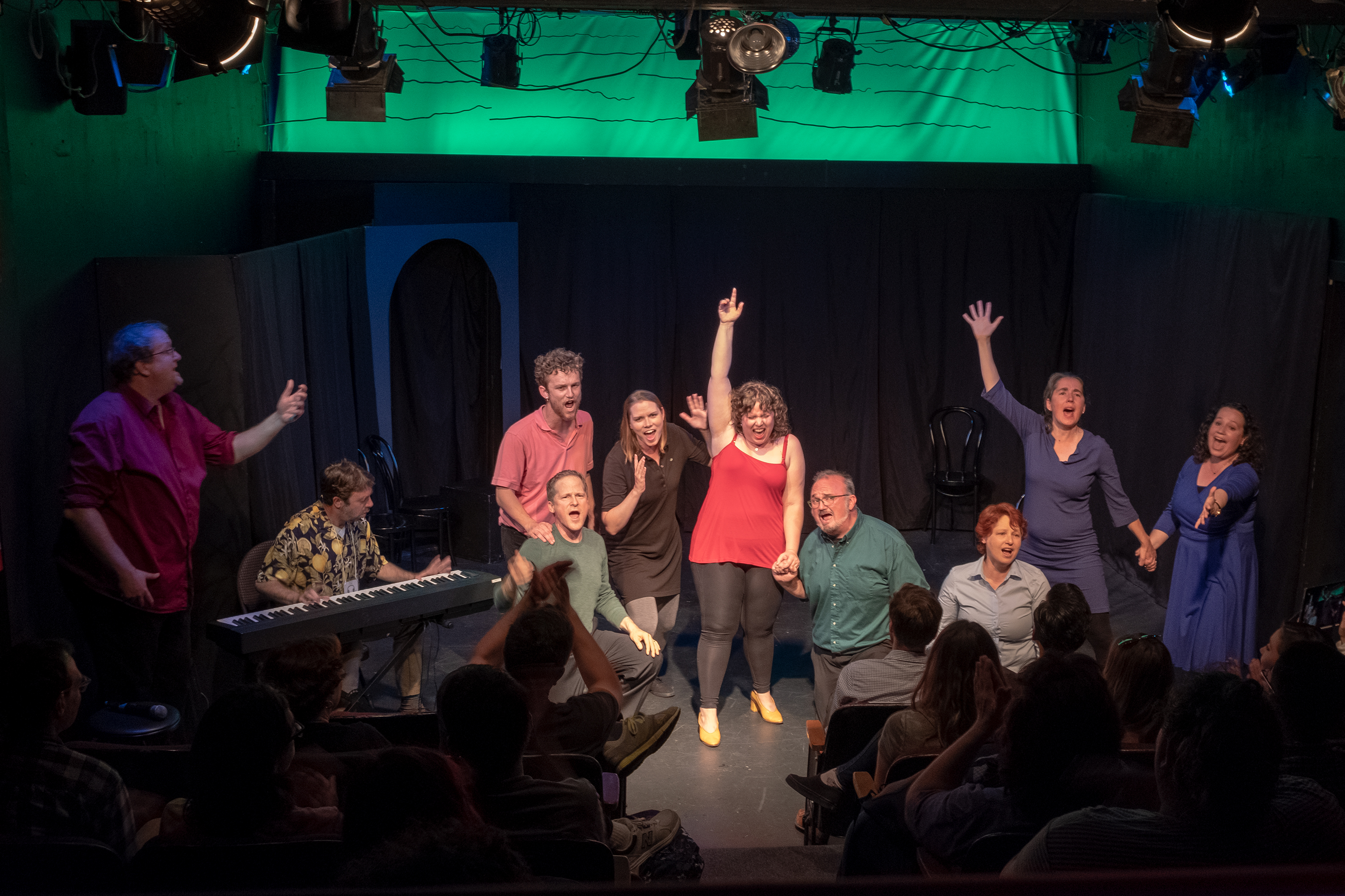
Un-Scripted performs in the 2019 West Coast Musical Improv Festival.

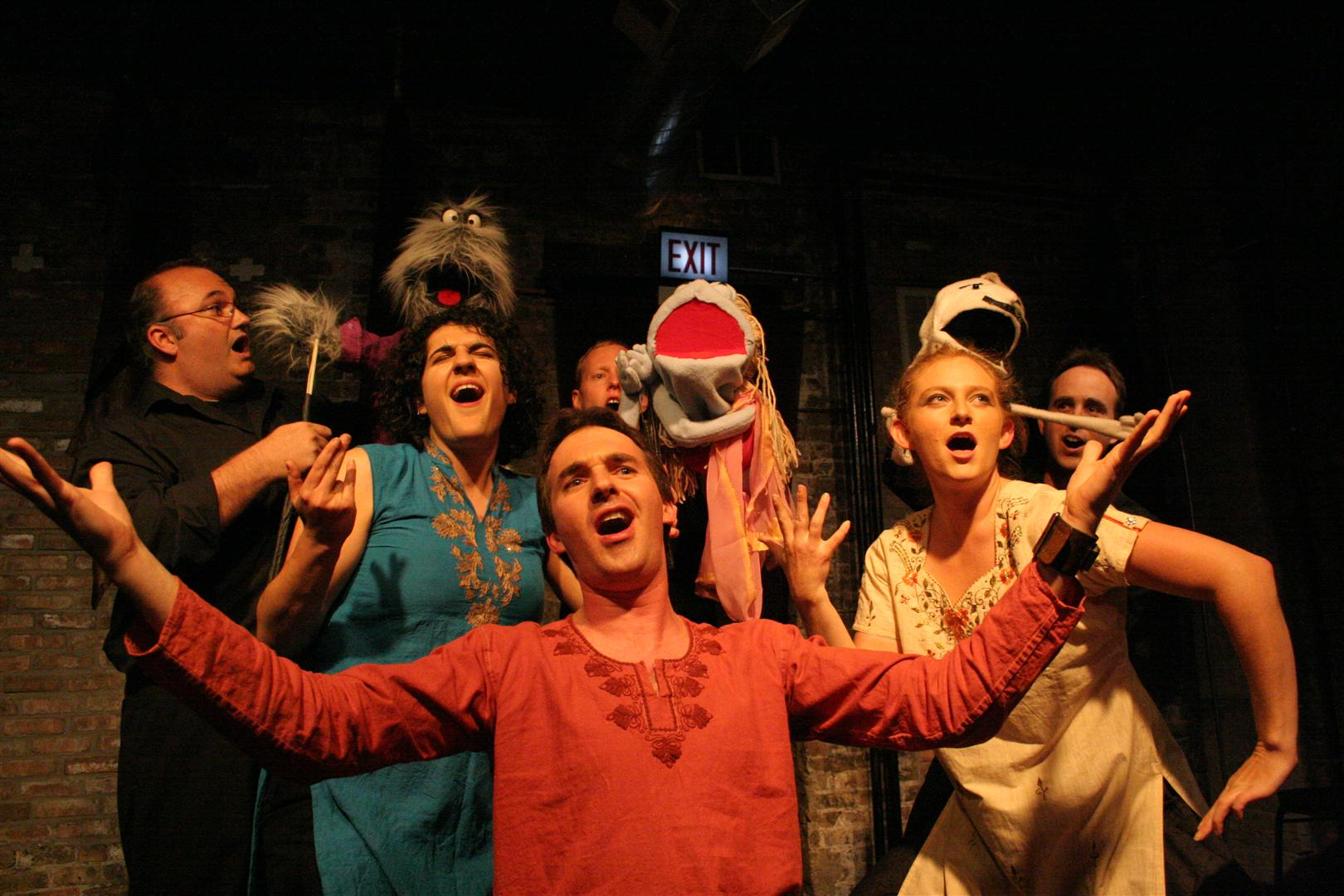
Un-Scripted Theater Company performs The Great Bollywood Puppet Extravaganza at the Gorilla Tango Theater as part of the 2009 Chicago Improv Festival.

The Un-Scripted Theater Company (2002 – 2020), was an improvisational theater company in San Francisco, California. The company performed many kinds of improv formats, such as comedy, mystery, drama, adventure, and musicals, each presented in 4 to 6 week runs each season, each with its own director, format, and vision. Un-Scripted specialized in narrative and genre-based "single-story" improvised theater.

== History ==
Un-Scripted Theater Company was founded in 2002 when the Thursday night performance group, The Belfry, was cut from the line up at San Francisco's BATS Improv. Determined to continue their performance work, 8 of the original 20 improvisors of The Belfry left and started Un-Scripted Theater Company in January 2003. Since then, Un-Scripted Theater Company has performed hundreds of shows all over the Bay Area, throughout California and across the United States.

== Founding members ==
- Alan Goy
- Brian McBride
- Christian Utzman
- Cort Worthington
- Glenn Etter
- Jennifer Kah
- Susan Snyder
- Tara McDonough

== Style ==
Un-Scripted Theater Company performs both shortform and longform improvisation. Shows are 2 hours long, with one intermission. Improvised theater is rooted in the idea that whatever you can perform with a script, like a play, movie, or musical can also be improvised, with unique and surprising results, which tap into deep universal themes and the innate creativity and individuality of all the players.

== Organization ==
Un-Scripted Theater Company is a 501c3 non-profit performing arts company. It has a core performing ensemble, some of whom make up the company's professional staff. Each show typically features two or more guests from outside the Ensemble. Guest Improvisors are chosen by the director of the show at open auditions, which are held before the start of the show's rehearsal period. Each show has a larger cast size than the number of performers in any given night's show, so the composition of the cast changes each night.

Un-Scripted's rehearsal period and performance schedule that resembles traditional, scripted theater.

== Show titles, by year ==
=== 2012 ===
- Un-Abridged: The Best of Ten Years of Un-Scripted
- Act 1: Scene 2

=== 2011 ===
- A Tale of Two Genres: An Improvised Dickens Musical
- Fear
- Act 1: Scene 2
- Secret Identity Crisis

=== 2010 ===
- Un-Scripted: un-scripted
- In A World
- A Tale of Two Genres: An Improvised Dickens Musical

=== 2009 ===
- Let it Snow!
- Shakespeare: The Musical
- Un-Scripted: un-scripted

=== 2008 ===
- The Great Puppet Bollywood Extravaganza
- Un-Scripted: un-scripted
- San Francisco Improv Festival
- Theater: The Musical
- Three

=== 2007 ===
- The Great Puppet Musical
- You Bet Your Improvisor
- The Love Show
- Shakespeare: Un-Scripted
- Let it Snow!

=== 2006 ===
- Supertrain
- The Impossible Film Project
- Theatresports RAW
- Two Man Longform at the Bay Area Comedy Festival
- You Bet Your ImprovisorThe Short & the Long of It (Abridged) at the Chicago Improv Festival Nine
- Love at First Sight

=== 2005 ===
- Let it Snow!
- The Impossible Film Project
- The Short & the Long of It!
- Love at First Sight
- You Bet Your Improvisor

=== 2004 ===
- Let It Snow!
- Fear
- The Short & the Long of It!
- Improvised Bawdy Shakespeare
- Aussie Rules Theatersports
- "Three"
- Bawdy Shakespeare at BATS Improv
- Improv Survivor

=== 2003 ===
- The Cafe Sappore series
- FEAR. reborn
- The Amazing Improvised Musical!
- Improvised Bawdy Shakespeare
- Impro Bingo
- The Short & the Long Of It!
- Spring Sing and Improv Carnival Gala
