= Juš Milčinski =

Slovenian improviser

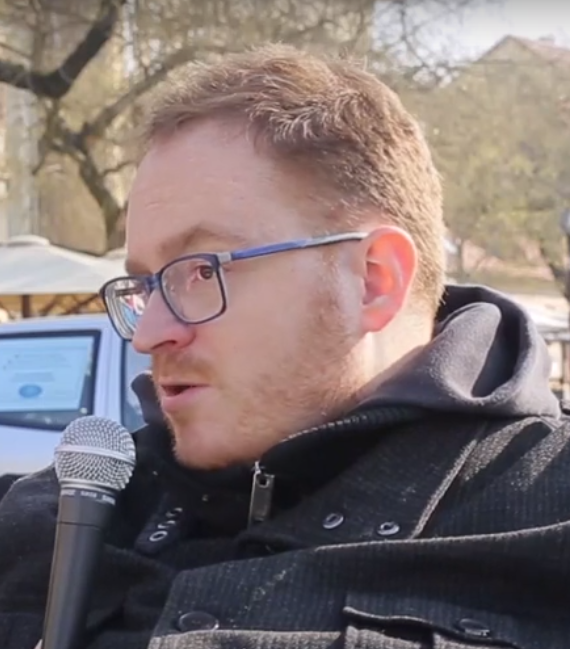
- Juš Milčinski in 2022
- Education: University of Ljubljana
- Occupations: theatre improviser, manager

Juš Milčinski is a Slovenian improviser best known for his role in reorganization and revitalization of Impro League in 2005. He is executive producer at international Naked Stage festival of improvisational theatre, and a member of IGLU Theatre team.
