= Blackout Improv =

Improvisational comedy troupe in Minneapolis, Minnesota

- Formation: 2015
- Type: Theatre group
- Purpose: Improvisational comedy
- Location: Minneapolis, Minnesota
- Website: www.blackoutimprov.com

Blackout Improv is an improvisational comedy theatre troupe in Minneapolis, Minnesota. Founded in 2015, the cast is completely black. Topics of monthly comedy performances include standard improv audience suggestions as well as a special focus on civil rights issues like police brutality, white privilege, and cultural appropriation. Blackout Improv responded to the shooting of Jamar Clark as well as the acquittal of police officer Jeronimo Yanez after the shooting of Philando Castile.

Blackout founded the Black and Funny Improv Festival with the intent to bring more people of color to the Twin Cities improv theater scene. Blackout Improv regularly performs at HUGE Theater, Mixed Blood Theatre in Cedar-Riverside, Minneapolis, and other venues throughout Minnesota.

Blackout's founders are Alsa Bruno, Joy Dolo Anfinson, Andy Hilbrands, John Gebretatose and Kory LaQuess Pullam.
