= Unexpected Company =

Improvisational comedy group

Unexpected Company is an improvisational comedy group founded in Hollywood, California in 1986 by Tim Hillman, and recreated in Rhode Island in 2003 by Hillman and Justin James Lang.

== California version ==
The original iteration of Unexpected Company was founded by Tim Hillman in 1986 based on his desire to explore comedic improvisational theatre outside the boundaries of short-form improvisation. Hillman was formerly a director and teacher at the LA Connection in Sherman Oaks, California, where he trained under Kent Skov.

The original cast of Unexpected Company included-Emmy Award winners Lisa Kudrow and Conan O'Brien, experienced voice actors April Winchell and Paul Rugg from The Groundlings and LA Connection The company's body of work was created in Church of Scientology basement Celebrity Center Theatre in Los Angeles.

The group was originally known as "The Fun Onions" – a name discarded after one performance. Kudrow coined the actual name of the company after being inspired by a scene that involved company arriving unexpectedly for dinner. After a six-month run, the group disbanded.

== Tennessee version ==
In the 1990s, Unexpected Company was based in Sewanee, Tennessee, under Hillman's direction at St. Andrew's-Sewanee School and the University of the South. It functioned largely as an educational entity.

In that era, over thirty different performers worked with the group, with alumni Joe Petrilla, John Stewart, and Michael Barker going on to successful careers with the Titanic Players at Northwestern University and ImprovOlympic in Chicago and Los Angeles.

== Rhode Island version ==
=== Formation ===
When Hillman moved to Rhode Island in 2001, a chance meeting with a then-University of Rhode Island student, Justin James Lang, led to the reformation of the group in the Ocean State. The goal of the company in Rhode Island was to continue Unexpected Company's exploration of long-form improvisational theatre, particularly exploring the theories espoused by Charna Halpern and Del Close.

The cast was formed in 2003 with founding members Lang, Greg DeSantis, Andrew Mendillo, Nick Mendillo, and Brian Perry. Within a short time, the founding group was joined by Marialana Abbene, Matthew Archambault, Zack Brenner Geoffroy, Jordan Eastwood, Frank Fusaro, Victoria Gillette, Eric Harrington, and Tom Reedy. Many of these members were present at the group's first performance at the Warwick Museum of Art in February of that year.

The group struggled with the “Harold” format, and Hillman, as Artistic Director, guided them towards their own signature performance format, “The Morris”, which was discovered during a rehearsal sequence. “The Morris” is long-form improvisation based on personal monologues followed by scene development. It was named after Saved By the Bell character Zack Morris, who would often engage the audience with monologues both before and during scenes, in a way that was similar to the use of monologues in “The Morris”. Eventually, the form became three individuals delivering short, personal, extemporaneous opening monologues based on an audience suggestion. These monologues give inspiration to a series of improvised scenes in a montage-style format.

=== Growth and current status ===
Within months, Unexpected Company became notable in the local community and media, with full coverage in The Providence Journal and the Providence Phoenix that summer. The group grew rapidly in size, and began performing more frequently with weekly shows at 7:17 PM at the Warwick Museum of Art, as well as sets at the Firehouse Theatre in Newport and the now-defunct Castle Theatre in Providence.

After nine months, the rapid growth of the company, resultant change in performance direction, and company disapproval of Hillman's investment of company money on sound and technical equipment, and his desire to be paid as artistic director. This action led Hillman to depart from the group.

After Hillman's departure, the company continued their 7:17 performances at the Warwick Museum of Art, and began appearing internationally at festivals and shows such as the Edinburgh Festival Fringe in Scotland, the Philadelphia Improv Festival, the Del Close Marathon in New York City, the Toronto International Improv Festival, and the Miami Improv Festival, to name a few. In 2004, Unexpected Company collaborated with two area improv groups at the time, Improv Jones and Speed of Thought Players, to comprise the first annual Providence Improv Festival, an event that has grown exponentially in subsequent years.

As the group has grown, it has been acclaimed as “Best Comedy Troupe” by Rhode Island Monthly Magazine, “A breath of fresh air” by The Providence Phoenix, and “Hilarious“ by Motif.

The group is currently on indefinite hiatus while members pursue other projects.

==== Los Angeles Original Cast ====
- April Winchell
- Conan O'Brien
- Lisa Kudrow
- Tim Hillman

==== Sewanee, TN Cast ====
- Whitney Able
- Joe Petrilla

== Official alumni ==
Justin James Lang
Greg DeSantis
Brian Perry
Frank Fusaro
Matthew Archambault
Zack Geoffroy
Marialaina Abbene
Jordan Eastwood
Eric Harrington
Victoria Gilette
Tom Gleadow
Steven Harelick
Tim Hillman
Rich Madison
Nick Mendillo
Dan Mills
Tom Reedy
Brandon Taylor
Jeff Perry
Ben Lewis
Melissa Bowler
Tim Thibodeau
Sarah McLean
Billy Domineau
Ari Itkin
Kim Kalunian
John Ring
Rochelle Weinrauch
Kyle Pendola

== See also ==
- Improvisational theatre
- List of improvisational theatre companies
