= Pirates of Tokyo Bay =

English & Japanese improvisational comedy troupe in Tokyo

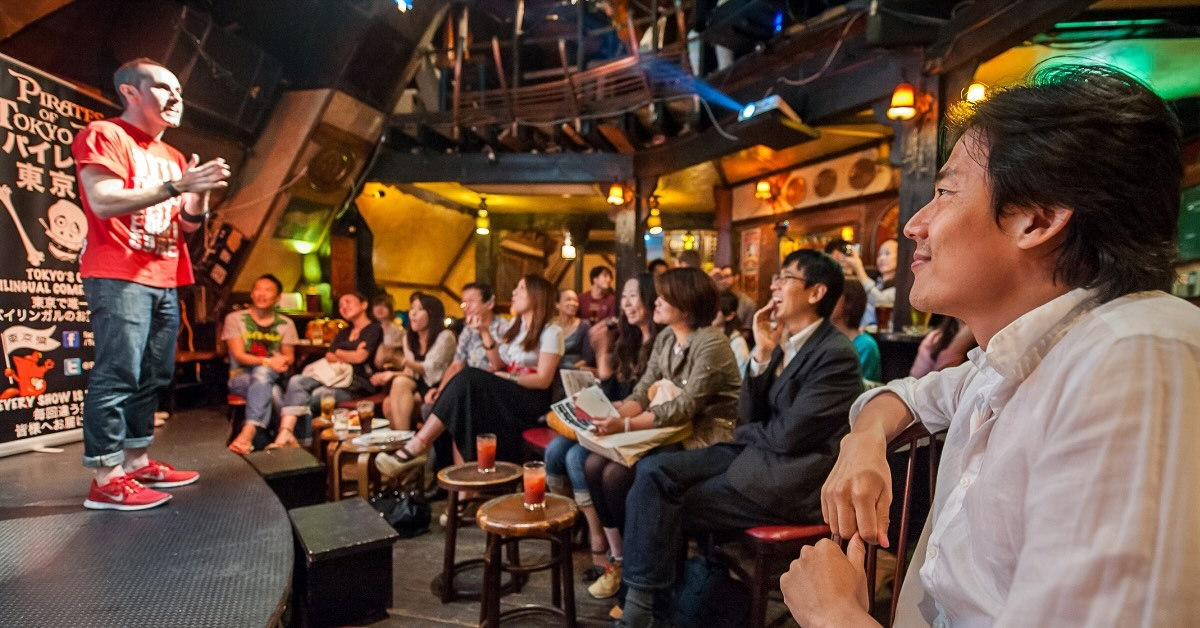
- The group performing in Ebisu, Tokyo
- Formation: 2010
- Founders: Mike Staffa
- Type: Improvisational theatre troupe
- Headquarters: Ebisu, Tokyo, Japan
- Coordinates: 35.647782°N 139.708389°E
- Website: www.piratesoftokyobay.com

The Pirates of Tokyo Bay (often abbreviated as POTB) is an improvisational theatre (improv comedy) troupe based in Tokyo, Japan, that performs in both English and Japanese. Founded in 2010, the group specializes in short-form improv comedy. The troupe utilizes a format that alternates between English and Japanese or mixes both languages within a single scene to accommodate multilingual audiences.

== History ==
The group was founded in 2010 by American improviser Mike Staffa following his move to Tokyo from Osaka, where he had previously established the Pirates of the Dotombori. By 2012, the group had performed in Beijing and Hong Kong, and appeared on Japanese television.

In addition to its monthly performances at the "What the Dickens!" venue in Ebisu, Tokyo, the group engages in community-based projects. In 2013, the troupe collaborated with the NPO "Over Cancer Together" to provide support for cancer survivors through performance, a project documented by HuffPost Japan in a profile on the group's organizational culture.

During the COVID-19 pandemic in 2020, the group transitioned to virtual performances via social media platforms.

== Performance style ==
The Pirates of Tokyo Bay perform short-form improv, creating scenes and songs based on live suggestions from the audience. The group relies heavily on physical comedy and pantomime to bridge language gaps for multinational audience members. Media coverage in GaijinPot described the troupe as the "bento box of comedy" in reference to its international cast and variety of performance styles.

== Educational and corporate work ==
The group conducts Applied improvisation workshops, applying theatrical techniques to professional communication and leadership training for corporations and academic institutions. The group's founder, Mike Staffa, developed curricula for Globis University, including "Improv Techniques for Business" and "Building Teams with Laughter," which applies improvisational methods to team performance and communication.The application of the troupe's improv methods in business environments has been presented at academic institutions, including Cornell University.

== Notable appearances ==
In addition to monthly shows in Tokyo, the group has performed at comedy festivals and events in cities including Manila, Beijing, and Hong Kong.

In 2012, the group's participation in the TED@Tokyo Talent Search event was featured on the official TED blog.

The troupe has participated in the Manila Improv Festival on multiple occasions. They performed at the festival in 2013 and 2015 alongside other international acts. By their return to the festival in 2019, organizers noted the group had become a "crowd favorite" for their high-energy, short-form comedic style.

In 2024, the group performed at the Tokyo International Comedy Festival alongside comedians from Yoshimoto Kogyo.

In 2026, the group received the Creative Arts Community Award (クリエイティブ・アートコミュニティ賞) at the Peatix Community Award 2026, selected from over 250 community organizations across Japan.

== See also ==
- List of improvisational theatre companies
- Improvisational theatre
