= The Lobby (improv) =

Comedy group in the United States

The Lobby was an improvisational comedy group based in Southern California. Unlike many improv groups, which are composed of many members who perform on a rotating basis, The Lobby was a small, close-knit group. The audience got to know each of the players and feel they were part of the group. The Lobby also irregularly put up a podcast, which further allowed their audience to connect with the players.

== History ==
The Lobby was formed by Josh Nicols, Matt Thomas, and Chase Hooper in the lobby of the Haugh Performing Arts Center while rehearsing for an adult Christmas show. However, the name, "The Lobby," comes from the 1950s advertisement jingle played in movie theaters, "Let's All Go to the Lobby."

The Lobby first performed on December 23, 2005 at the Renaissance Theatre in Glendora, California. After the Renaissance Theatre closed at the end of 2007, The Lobby moved to The Fontana Community Players' Theatre in Fontana, California and STAGEStheatre in Fullerton, California, where they remained.

On April 8, 2009, MyFOX Los Angeles announced that The Lobby was voted "Best Improv Comedy Group" in Orange County for 2009. The Lobby won again in 2010.

The Lobby started the Orange County Improv Cup, an improv tournament with randomly assigned teams of improvisers from all over Southern California, to raise money for the Hole in the Wall Camps. The team of Tony Rey, Staci Pratt, Kristin Sanchez, and Jill Tsai won the first ever Improv Cup title.

As of 2022, the Lobby has long been defunct. This is strongly reinforced by the fact that both Spectacles Improv Engine and STAGESTheatre have both been closed due to the pandemic in 2020.

== Format ==
The Lobby usually performed shortform improv, very similar to the styles of Whose Line is it Anyway? and ComedySportz. A normal show consists of 10 to 12 short improv games that are each based on a suggestion from the audience.

Every shortform show contains a game in which The Lobby's host, Josh Nicols, interviewed an audience member and then the game is played based on that interview. An example of an interview game is Eulogy, in which the players act out the audience member's funeral. The Lobby has also invented several games, such as CSI: Punnsylvania, which is based on the television show CSI: Miami. CSI: Punnsylvania was featured in William Hall's book, The Playbook, Improv Games for Performers.

Occasionally, The Lobby had performed a longform show. The format of the longform show was based on a genre of movie (such as a romantic comedy or comic book movie). The host got a handful of suggestions from the audience, and then the players acted out a twenty-minute movie based on those suggestions.

== Members (While The Group Was Active) ==
- Matt Thomas
- Alex Herrera
- Andy Rice
- Carl Entner
- Austin Floyd
- Autumn Herzer
- James Stebick

== Alumni ==
- Chris Flock
- Heather Boo
- Chase Hooper
- Josh Nicols
- DJ O'Hea
