= Batsu game =

Element in Japanese stage comedy

A batsu game (罰ゲーム, batsu gēmu; meaning "penalty game") is a common element in Japanese owarai stage comedy and variety shows. The name comes from 罰, batsu, meaning both "punishment" and "X", as in an incorrect answer.

== Definition ==
Generally, a batsu game takes place after some sort of competition or bet. The winner forces the loser to participate in the batsu game, which involves doing or experiencing something unpleasant. The winner takes enjoyment in the fact that he does not have to experience the punishment and that he is forcing the loser to do so. Because the batsu game relies on an acceptance on the part of the loser to experience the punishment as a result of losing, precautions must be taken to ensure that the punishment game is not too cruel or needlessly painful.

Batsu games are often shown on Japanese TV shows because they are considered funny. However, the humor arises not from the punishment itself, but from the reactions of the (most commonly) comedians who are experiencing the punishment.

== Examples ==
A basic example of a batsu game in a variety show is "rock, paper, scissors" and leads to the loser being slapped in the face by the winner. Other common examples include being forced into a pool of extremely hot water or eating something filled with wasabi. Somewhat more complicated examples of punishments found in Japanese TV shows include the following: skydiving; thrill rides at an amusement park; eating foods not commonly considered edible; or being forced to fight a martial artist or sumo wrestler. However, because these punishments take a fair amount of preparation and expense, these are commonly found only on TV shows.

There have also been batsu games where the competition itself is like a batsu game—none of the competitors are participating in order to win, but they are participating in order to be as funny as possible. Examples of this include the Human Tetris segment from the Tunnels TV show, the All-Star Athletic Games from the TV show Haneru no Tobira, and the 24-Hour batsu games from Gaki no Tsukai.

A possible non-Japanese example of a batsu game includes the "humiliations" that occur after one of the two titular participants fails a challenge in the Canadian TV show Kenny vs. Spenny. New York City comedy troupe Face Off Unlimited also produces a weekly improv comedy batsu game show called BATSU! The Dan Patrick Show features a "Wheel of Punishment," which features a number of batsu game-style punishments.

== Criticism ==
Batsu games are considered funny in Japan because of the (often outrageous) reactions of the comedians that experience them. However, there have been cases of injuries caused by batsu games, such as one at the Kumamoto Aquadome, where a participant jumped into a pool from a high dive platform and broke several ribs. Injuries caused by such batsu games are often not aired on TV, meaning that an injury hurts both the injured person and the TV show itself. As batsu games have become more and more common on Japanese TV, some shows have increased the danger of the punishments. Critics have commented that the problem lies not with the batsu games themselves, but the popular demand for them.

Conversely, participants in televised batsu games are often criticized as faking their distress, because the humor lies only in their reaction to the punishment and therefore the punishment need not exist. An oft-discussed example of this is the hot water baths—the participants claim that the water is extremely hot, but it does not need to be hot for the participants to provide a funny reaction. As such, participants will often try to convince the viewers that the water is hot through various means (having an audience member stick his hand in the water, for example, or breaking character by saying that the water is hotter than it was during rehearsal). Generally speaking, the punishments are real rather than faked (the water is hot, the wasabi is spicy), but they are maintained at a level of preventing injuries.
