= Providence Improv Guild =

Improvisational theatre in Providence, Rhode Island

Providence Improv Guild (PIG) is an improvisational theatre in Providence, Rhode Island. It is located in AS220 at 95 Empire Street, Providence RI, 02903.

== Performances and groups ==
PIG has performances every Friday at 8pm, and Saturday night at 7pm & 9pm. House teams perform regularly at PIG.

Improvisers from around the world have been featured at PIG, including performers from Chicago, New York, Arizona, California and as far as India.

PIG also maintains an open stage policy and welcomes any comedy group to visit and perform on its stage.

== Classes ==
PIG offers an improv curriculum with the goal of making students feel confident and to get them on stage as quickly as possible. There are four levels of classes that focus on Scene Support, Game, and Character and cumulate in the study of the classic longform improv structure the Harold (improvisation).

Specialized workshops are offered and taught by guild teachers as well as out-of-town performers. Popular workshops have included Love the One Your With: Choosing Love in Scenes, Stop Trying to Be Funny, and Beefing up Your Show.
