= The Playground Theater =

Theater company in Chicago, Illinois

Coordinates: 41°56′25.2″N 87°38′56.9″W

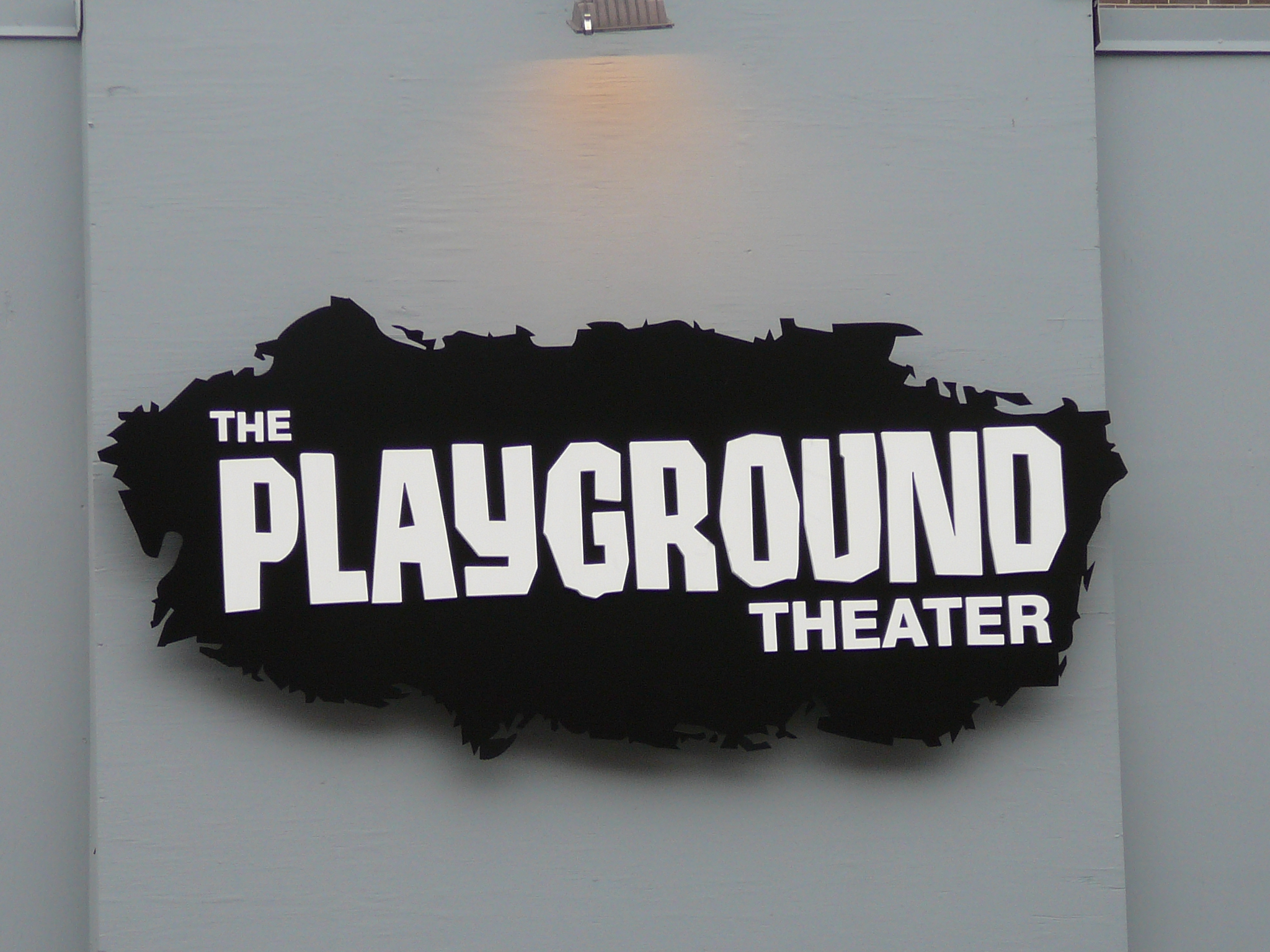
Theater sign

The Playground Theater is a continuously operating non-profit theater in Chicago dedicated to Modern Theatrical Improvisation, a form of theater invented in the city. The Playground was founded in 1997 by a collective of Chicago improvisors. Originally located on Halsted Street, the theater now produces shows at different theatrical venues across Chicago. The Playground Theater was created to provide a Chicago venue where improvisors could have complete artistic control over the work they produced.

The theater initially existed as a non-profit co-op, governed by its member companies, or "teams." The Playground was formerly home to over 12 house teams in addition to guest teams, and members of the theater's Incubator Program.

The Playground's former Incubator Program allowed applicants to be judged on their skills at scene-based improvised comedy, assembled into Incubator Teams, and subsequently guaranteed a certain number of shows on The Playground's stage. The newly created teams were then allowed to perform, hire their own coaches, and generally pursue a career as an improv ensemble.

The Playground launched Playground Theatricals in 2015 with the production of Don Chipotle, an original play written by Juan Villa. At the end of 2016, The Playground Theater announced the launch of a new program for writers, directors and performers called MOSAIC. MOSAIC accepted a 7-month MOSAIC writer and production residency ran in association with The Department of Cultural Affairs at the Chicago Cultural Center, and featured workshops and readings of work that were in development at the time.

In March 2020, The Playground Theater announced a temporary closure of their venue as a result of the COVID-19 pandemic. In May 2021, The Playground announced that they would not return to their venue on Halsted Street. Since then, they have produced shows on behalf of artists at venues across Chicago.

In April 2025, The Playground Theater announced on their website and their Instagram feed that they were moving into a new venue at 4416 N. Clark, above the bar MyBuddy's.

== See also ==
- List of improvisational theatre companies
