= Kent Haines =

American comedian

Alexander Kent Haines
- Born: July 31, 1985 (age 41); Birmingham, Alabama, United States
- Spouse: Andrea Haines

Comedy career
- Years active: 2007–2011
- Website: http://www.kenthaines.com

Alexander Kent Haines is currently a middle-school teacher in Hoover, Al and was a stand-up comedian who has appeared on Season 4 of Comedy Central's Live at Gotham and the public radio program The Sound of Young America.

Haines began his stand-up career while attending college at Brown University in Providence, Rhode Island. After graduating in 2007 he relocated to Philadelphia and began performing at local open mics and stand-up clubs. In the summer of 2008 he starred in a web series titled "That Guy" on the Sony website Crackle and created "Why Am I Not Famous?!?", a live late-night talk show, for Philly Improv Theater. In August of that year he was chosen as the winner in the 2nd Annual Philly's Phunniest contest at Helium Comedy Club. This recognition lead to an appearance at the South Beach Comedy Festival in January 2009. Haines was tapped to appear on Season 4 of the Comedy Central series Live at Gotham in July 2009. In September 2009 Haines appeared in the Philadelphia Fringe Festival as part of a live taping for the public radio show The Sound of Young America.
