= Face Off Unlimited =

Comedy production company in New York City

Face Off Unlimited is an improvisational comedy production company based in New York City.

== History ==
In 2003, Jay Painter and Eric Robinson founded Friday Night Face Off, a weekly improvised comedy show in Port Jefferson, New York featuring two teams of comedic improvisers engaged in a mock competition, a concept originated by Theatresports. Friday Night Face Off (often abbreviated as FNFO) has since become the longest continuously running improv comedy shows in Long Island history. In 2009, Painter and Robinson formed Face Off Unlimited, A Limited Liability Company, and brought on former FNFO creative director Joe Tex as Partner and Chief Operating Director.

Face Off Unlimited produces various comedy stage shows, has a writing division who specializes in creating content for robots, video games, and iOS applications, including French robotics company, Aldebaran Robotics and its NAO and Pepper humanoid robots. Face Off offers multi-level improv and writing classes and workshops that utilize techniques of improvisation and creative ensemble.

In 2010 Face Off Unlimited opened Face Off University at The Secret Theatre in Long Island City, New York, offering classes on improvisation and their approach to the art form. Since 2014, they have moved their school to Face Off Unlimited Headquarters in Astoria, Queens.

On January 10, 2011, Face Off debuted their live Japanese game-show comedy in New York City's East Village called Face Off Unlimited presents BATSU! Translated from the Japanese word for "penalty game", BATSU! was named one of the "Best Things To Do In NYC" by CBS New York and was made a Time Out New York 2011 Critics' Pick and an official Village Voice, Voice Choice. BATSU! was also called "one of the most entertaining...nights in NYC" by Backstage Magazine. BATSU! is now in its 7th year.

Face Off Unlimited co-produced the 2011 and 2012 Queens Fringe Festival in partnership with the Long Island city Arts Open, featuring the All Day Improv Festival. The All Day Improv Festival featured UCB Theatre house team Standard Oil, iMusical: The reunion Show!, and International Stinger, a comedy team from Chicago founded at the Playground Theatre.

In 2013 Face Off Unlimited partnered with radio personality and writer Lyle Pinder to create the In The Room podcast. Former guests, called roommates, include actors Tyler Posey, Joel Murray, Academy Award Winner Jim Rash, Broadway actor and star of Frozen, Josh Gad, Canadian comedian Scott Thompson, and YouTube star Lloyd Ahlquist, better known as EpicLLOYD.

In 2014 Face Off Unlimited opened The NYC Improv Face Off in Times Square at Times Scare.

2014 also saw successful runs of Face Off Unlimited Presents Goon River, a completely improvised storytelling experience in complete darkness, and NADS, an improv comedy meets Magic Mike that boasted the hottest men in comedy.

On June 10, 2016, Face Off Unlimited opened BATSU! Chicago in the upstairs Hachi Lounge at Kamehachi at 1531 N Wells, St, in Chicago's Old Town.

In 2017, FOU created their BATSU! Tour Co after signing with Metropolis Management

Also in 2017, Face Off Unlimited launched FOU STUDIOS, a full-service video and podcast production company based at FOU Headquarters.

== See also ==
- Improvisational theatre
- List of improvisational theatre companies
