= David Litt =

Author, former Obama speechwriter

- Litt in 2026
- Born: September 17, 1986 (age 40); New York City, U.S.
- Education: Yale University (BA)
- Occupations: Political speechwriter, author
- Years active: 2011–present

David Litt (born September 17, 1986) is an American political speechwriter and author of the comedic memoir Thanks, Obama: My Hopey Changey White House Years. He is currently the head writer/producer for Funny or Die's office in Washington, D.C.

== Biography ==
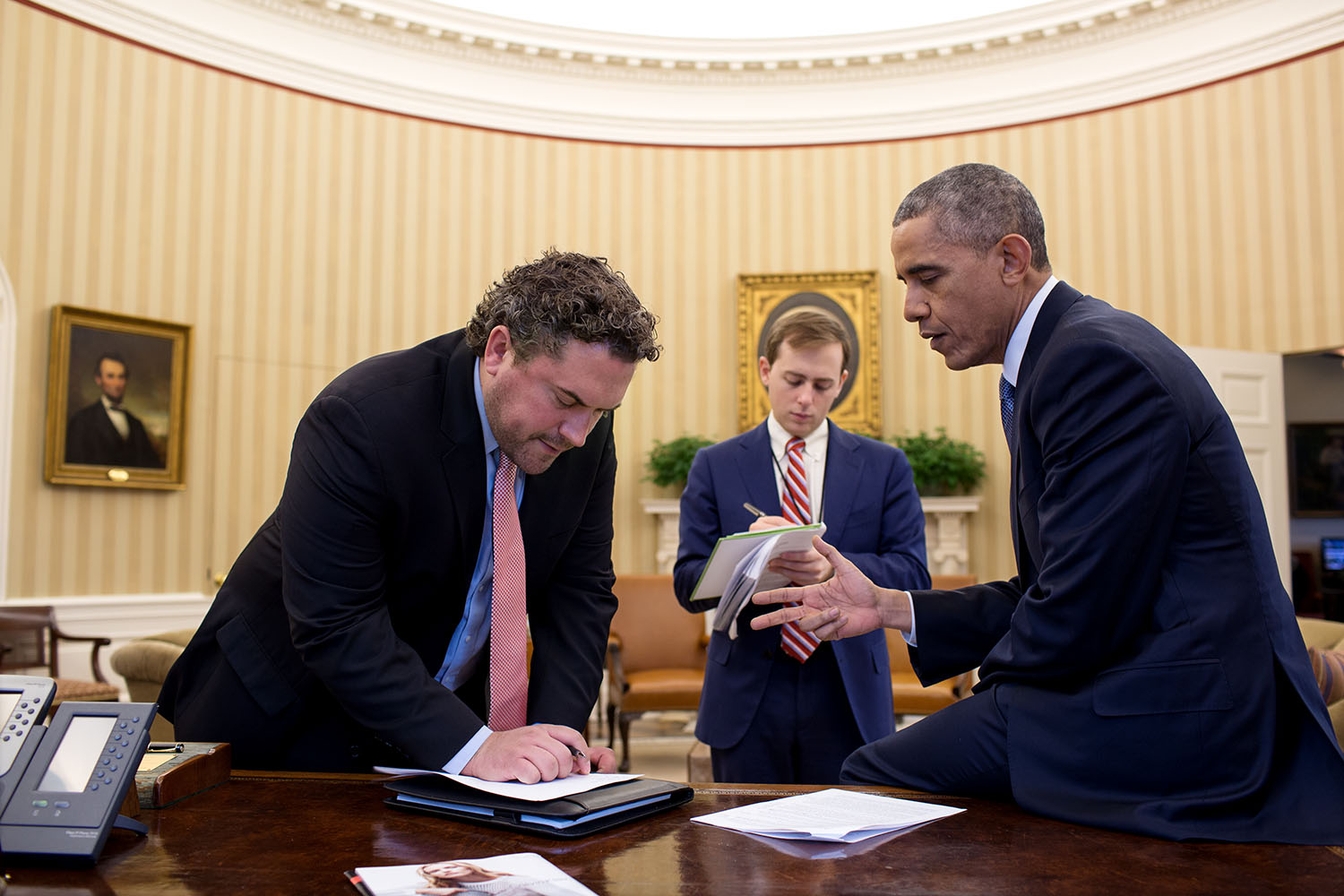
Litt (center) with President Obama, November 2014

Born to a Jewish family in New York City where he attended the Dalton School, Litt attended Yale University, where he was a member of the Yale Ex!t Players and editor-in-chief of the Yale Record.

He first got involved in political speechwriting through an internship with West Wing Writers. He entered the White House in 2011, at the age of 24, and for four years served as a senior presidential speechwriter first to Presidential Advisor Valerie Jarrett, White House Chief of Staff William M. Daley, and ultimately to President Barack Obama, including as the lead writer on four White House Correspondents' Association dinner presentations.

Litt has also written for The Onion and McSweeney's Internet Tendency.

Litt married Jacqueline Kappler on August 4, 2018.

== Books ==
Litt's first book, Thanks, Obama, was a New York Times Best Seller and was named one of the best books of 2017 by Esquire magazine. His second, Democracy in One Book or Less, was released in June 2020.

Litt's third book, It's Only Drowning, A True Story of Learning to Surf and the Search for Common Ground, was released on June 24, 2025. The book discusses the author's friendship with his brother-in-law during the COVID-19 pandemic.

== Bibliography ==
- Thanks, Obama: My Hopey, Changey White House Years (Ecco Press) ISBN 978-0-0625684-5-8
- Democracy in One Book or Less (Ecco Press) ISBN 978-0-0628793-6-3
