= New Zealand Improv Festival =

Annual improvisational theatre festival in New Zealand

The New Zealand Improv Festival is an annual improvisational theatre festival held in Wellington, New Zealand. It brings together improvisors from New Zealand, Australia and other countries through workshops and performances.

== History ==
The festival began in 2008 under Wellington Improvisation Troupe. It now operates under the New Zealand Improv Trust.

== See also ==
- List of improvisational theater festivals
