= Fratelli Bologna =

Fratelli Bologna is an American business theater company based in San Francisco.

The group brings their theater skills to the business world through engaging trade show presentations, creativity training, improv training, meeting facilitation and theatrical interventions during conferences. Fratelli Bologna combines scripted material, original music, improvisation, and dramatic visual imagery to convey complex messages to a wide range of audiences including the leaders of major corporations in the United States and Europe.

Clients include Dow Corning Corporation, Lucent Technologies (now Alcatel-Lucent), CHRISTUS Health., Ernst & Young’s Center for Business Innovation, Round Table Pizza, and Disneyland. They won the Drama-Logue Award for best ensemble in 1987.

== History ==
In 1979 a group of ten men and women performed the Italian masked comedies of the Commedia dell'Arte on the main stage of the Renaissance Pleasure Fair in Novato, California. Called La Famiglia Bologna (the Bologna Family), they performed together for two years.

Richard Dupell founded Fratelli Bologna (originally i Fratelli Bologna) in 1981 with four other actors from the original troupe: John X. Heart, Christopher Beale, Jack Tate and William Hall. Fratelli Bologna, with two additional members of La Famiglia Bologna, Ed Holmes and Drew Letchworth, was cast as the Press Corps in Philip Kaufman's movie The Right Stuff.

From 1998 – 2002, Fratelli Bologna was the theater in residence for San Francisco’s Idea Factory founded by John Kao, author of Innovation Nation: How America Is Losing Its Innovation Edge, Why It Matters, and What We Can Do to Get It Back. The group was fundamental in the founding of BATS Improv and its approach is based on the work of Keith Johnstone, author of "Impro" and "Impro for Storytellers."
