= Bassprov =

Bassprov Logo

Bassprov is a two-person longform improvisational comedy show. The main characters, Donny Weaver (played by Mark Sutton) and Earl Hinkle (played by Joe Bill), are middle-aged central Indiana blue-collar men who spend their free time fishing and talking about sports. The show begins with an audience suggestion of a current event and "something you can stick your fingers in." From there, a completely improvised dialogue is created while interconnecting events from the characters' lives and the suggestions, all while the two men fish.

The show has been performed throughout the United States and internationally at festivals, clubs, and colleges and have been awarded the Nichols & May Award for Comedy Duo of the Year from the Chicago Improv Festival and Chicago's Best Comedy Group by Bass Ale.
