= The Bent Theatre =

American comedy troupe

The Bent Theatre is an improvisational comedy troupe based in Charlottesville, Virginia, United States that was founded in 2004.

== History ==
Whole World Theater Charlottesville was formed in February 2004 by Jennifer Horne as she started teaching classes above Sylvia's Pizza on the Downtown Mall. They become the fourth major improv group in Charlottesville joining, The Whethermen (UVA), Amuse-Bouche (UVA), and the Improfessionals

In October 2005, the group changed its name from Whole World Theater Company to the Bent Theatre Company.

In 2006, due to the closing of their performance space at Garden of Sheba the Bent Theatre moved to the "trendy" hot spot R2, the dance club located in Rapture Bar and Grill.

Over summer 2007, the Bent Theatre re-ignited improv as a popular entertainment option in Charlottesville with several pop culture parodies. They performed improvised versions of the Star Wars Trilogy, Raiders of the Lost Ark, Romeo and Juliet (for Valentine's Day) and The Life and Times of George W. Bush (an original improv play written by Bent member ).

On December 31, 2007, the Bent Theatre performed at First Nite Virginia for the second year in a row with fellow improvisers, the Improfessionals.

On April 25, 2008, the Bent Theatre began performing monthly shows at Play On! Theater having one of its largest audiences ever attend its premiere performance at the theater. UVA improv group, Amuse-Bouche performed at half-time.

In August 2008, The Bent Theatre was once again asked to perform at First Night Virginia.

On October 13, 2008, the Bent Theatre announced a Tribute to Star Wars show planned for November 21 at Play On!

On November 21, 2008, the Bent Theatre opened Star Wars to an audience of over 70 people. This show was the largest cast performance in its history (11) and was the first show where the entire cast wore costumes

On December 12, 2008, the Bent performed an improvised tribute to Dr. Seuss' classic tale "How the Grinch Stole Christmas, directed by Andy Davis, with Ray Smith starring in the title role

On August 22, 2025

== Shows ==
The Bent's shows generally run for about 90 minutes with a brief intermission separating two halves. They primarily perform shortform improvisation, a series of short scenes or games featuring MC interaction and multiple audience suggestions.

The MC is often the writer of the show, who selects the games, the actors, the background stories and the type of suggestions to ask the audiences. The members who most often write and MC the shows are Jenn Horne and Andy Davis. Recently, more people have begun writing shows, particularly the parodies. Patrick Kilmer directed The Wizard of Oz, Alex Modic directed Harry Potter and Aaron Gilley directed Casino Royale.

They currently perform the first Sunday of every month at Decipher Brewing in Charlottesville as of 2025.

== The Smart Asps ==
The Smart Asps was the teen improv group founded by Jenn Horne shortly after the Bent Theatre was formed. The group performed several shows and grew to more thanr a dozen members before disbanding in 2007. Two of its members, Ben Cole and Michael Abraham, joined the Bent Theatre and have been regular cast members since.
