= National Comedy Theatre =

Improv comedy troupe in San Diego

NCT logo

The National Comedy Theatre (NCT) is an improvisational comedy company based in San Diego, California. It was founded by Gary Kramer, its artistic director, in 1999. By 2004, the company operated in both San Diego and New York. It soon began to tour internationally, performing for U.S. troops abroad. NCT's is the longest-running show in San Diego history. In addition to its public performances, the company offers improvisational comedy classes.

== History ==
NCT show in San Diego (2025); Kramer at center

In 1999 Gary Kramer recruited 18 San Diego-area performers for a five-month improv training program. With Kramer as artistic director, NCT began performing on October 8, 1999, at the 103-seat former Marquis Theatre in the Mission Hills area of San Diego. The company established a New York operation around 2004, with a venue on West 36th Street. NCT produced up to 600 performances annually between the two locations.

By 2006, the company had undertaken several international tours, entertaining U.S. troops abroad. that year a 26-day tour of military installations in and around Iraq was arranged through Armed Forces Entertainment and included performances at military hospitals and other facilities. In 2010, the readers of Backstage voted NCT's New York show a runner-up in the category of Favorite Improv Theater.

In 2013, NCT became the longest continuously running show in San Diego history after its 3,823rd performance. By 2024, the company had given more than 6,500 performances.

== Description ==
The troupe performs mostly short-form improvisational comedy in which performers create family-friendly scenes based on audience suggestions. Sometimes performances are structured as a competition between two improv teams, and some are musical improv, both in San Diego and New York, but not always. The company fields rotating casts with a total of about 25 performers in San Diego. Alongside its short-form improvisational comedy, NCT has given long-form performances inspired by film noir, Shakespeare and science fiction.

In addition to its public performances, the company offers improvisational comedy classes and has provided corporate performances and improv-based team-building workshops. In 2017, the company helped to found a non-profit organization, Unscripted Learning, which uses improvisational theatre in educational programs, including for young people on the autism spectrum and seniors.
