= Philly Improv Theater =

Comedy theater group in Pennsylvania

Coordinates: 39.9513°N 75.1746°W

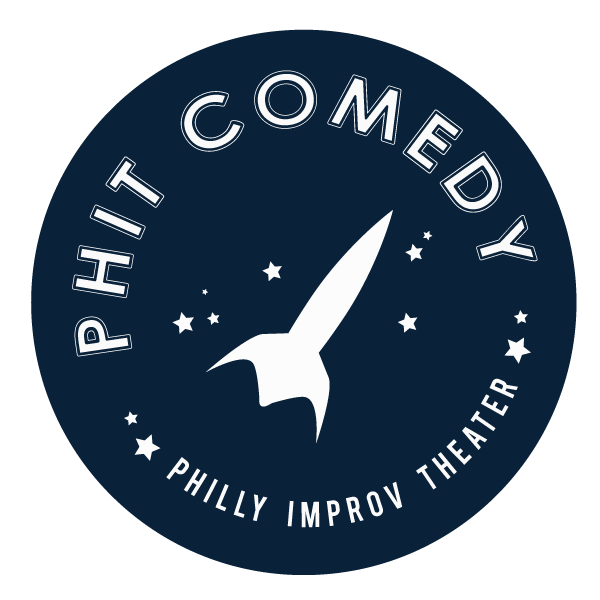
Logo of the Philly Improv Theater from 2017 (designed by Whitney Harris).

Philly Improv Theater, or PHIT (pronounced "fit"), is a Philadelphia, Pennsylvania comedy theater which formerly presented shows at The Adrienne Theatre in Center City Philadelphia. The theater currently operates a training center with programs in improv comedy, sketch comedy and stand-up comedy. PHIT's most notable alumnus is stand-up comedian Kent Haines, who was the 2008 winner of the Philly's Phunniest contest at Helium Comedy Club and has appeared on public radio show The Sound of Young America and Season 4 of Comedy Central's program Live at Gotham. In addition to Haines, other comedians from Philadelphia who appeared on stage at PHIT have gone on to perform at major comedy venues in cities like New York and Los Angeles, founded their own theatre companies, and appeared in touring productions for The Second City.

== History ==
PHIT was founded as a nonprofit in October 2005 by Greg Maughan, with assistance from local improvisers Bobbi Block, Matt Holmes and Alexis Simpson. The original purpose of the theater was to offer improv comedy instruction for beginning to advanced students. Over time PHIT expanded its mission to include sketch comedy instruction, and became a presenter and producer for all varieties of alternative comedy shows. Viewers of Philadelphia's local FOX affiliate, WTXF-TV, voted PHIT as the city's Best Comedy Club in their 2009 Hot List competition.

== Productions ==
PHIT hosted a variety of comedy shows every night of the week: improv, sketch, stand-up, and variety comedy shows, as well as occasional movie screenings. Currently, they do not have a performance space. The theater formerly produced weekly performances by ten improv comedy house teams (The Future, Big Baby, Hoffman, 1816, Fjord, Channel 77, Swan Year, Metropolis, PG-13, and Hackett Park), three sketch comedy house teams (The Flat Earth, Dog Mountain, and Goat Rodeo) as well as independent improv and sketch groups. Also on PHIT's regular schedule were several variety comedy shows (People of Interest, Theme Show, Gimmick Show, Videostew+Monologues), a Panel Comedy show (A Few Answers Short), a "found comedy" night (Guilty Pleasures), a sketch open mic called Sketch Up or Shut Up, and an open improv jam. PHIT also hosted Dynamite Series covering a wide variety of comedic disciplines (Dirty Laundry, Study Hall). PHIT has also presented shows by performing groups from New York's Upright Citizens Brigade Theater, Magnet Theater, and The Peoples Improv Theater; and individuals including Kevin Allison of MTV's The State, Susan Messing of Chicago's Annoyance Theater, Kevin McDonald of The Kids in the Hall, and Dave Hill. Every first Sunday of the month PHIT hosts an improvised show Story UP! for kids ages 5 and up.

From March 2006 until January 2008, PHIT produced a monthly improv comedy show at Fergie's Pub in Philadelphia's Center City. From January 2007 until December 2013, the theater has hosted regular performances at The Shubin Theatre, in addition to producing additional shows at others venues. In 2009, the theater produced a weekend of shows collectively titled "Philly Invades NYC" at Under Saint Marks' in New York City.

In January 2014 PHIT opened its permanent home on Second Stage at the Adrienne Theater in Center City Philadelphia at 2030 Sansom Street. In 2016 PHIT expanded to occupy the Mainstage in the Adrienne Theater. In June 2023 PHIT left the Adrienne, and opened their new training center at The Arden Theatre’s Hamilton Family Arts Center in Old City Philadelphia. They currently do not have a performance space.

=== Philly Fringe Festival ===
PHIT has participated in the Philadelphia Live Arts and Philly Fringe Festival every year since 2006. In 2008, the theater programmed performances by improv and sketch comedy groups on all 16 days of the festival, anchoring these shows around an original improv-to-script musical comedy titled "The Hoppers Hit the Road". The production garnered considerable attention and positive reviews in mainstream local media, including a review by The Philadelphia Inquirer. During the 2009 festival, the theater presented an ambitious schedule of performances - this time in the Fringe Festival's newly created Improv/Comedy category.

== Training program ==
Since its inception, the theater has offered a core curriculum of classes teaching basic to advanced improvising techniques. PHIT's curriculum is based heavily on similar programs at Chicago's Second City Training Center and iO (formerly ImprovOlympic), and New York's Upright Citizens Brigade Theatre. In February 2009, PHIT introduced a similar core curriculum in sketch comedy writing. PHIT uses local performers as instructors for its improv core curriculum, and a mix of local and nationally recognized teachers (including Kevin Allison of MTV's The State and former Saturday Night Live writer Ali Farahnakian) for its sketch comedy program. In 2015 PHIT launched its Kids & Teens program offering classes to kids in grades K-12.

== See also ==
- Alternative comedy
- Improvisational theatre
- List of improvisational theatre companies
- Sketch comedy
- Bruce Walsh
