= The Maydays =

The Maydays are an improvised comedy company founded in Brighton in 2004 by John Cremer.

Their shows include Confessions, Tonight's Top Story, Guest Who and The Fringe Show.

After making a debut at the Brighton Fringe in 2004, and taking their first show to the Edinburgh Festival Fringe in 2006, the Maydays won Best Comedy Show in the 2007 Brighton Fringe with their show Mayday! The Musical. Related shows have included Argus! The Musical and Evening Standard! The Musical. The company began a residency at the Komedia in 2008 and performed Confessions there on a monthly basis.

Beginning in 2008 several members of the Maydays travelled to Chicago to study longform improvisation at IO Theater and the Annoyance Theatre, and later brought improvisation tutors to the UK.

== Sources ==
- Tyler, Nick; Lloydie. "MissImp Cast 5: Singing With The Maydays". MissImp Improv Podcast.
- Samuel, Joe; Urquhart, Heather. "Musical Improv Comedy Podcasts".
- Cremer, John (2009). Improv. Sunmakers. ISBN 978-1-908693-03-7.
- Samuel, Joe; Urquhart, Heather (2012). Sing It!. Maydays Publishing. ISBN 978-0957153509.
- Samuel, Joe; Peters, Liz (2012). Confessions. Maydays Publishing. ISBN 978-0957153516.
- "FringeReview chats to John Cremer". 20 April 2010.
- Obiora, Konrad (June 2007). "Interviews: Katy Schutte". Inside Comedy.
- Vivian, Rhiannon (28 May 2011). "Katy Schutte Swears By Improv". London Improv.
- "Starships & Giggles (interview with Project Two)". The Bristol Improv Network.
- Schutte, Katy. "Katy Schutte Website".
- Smith, Paul (27 April 2010). "The Maydays, Komedia, Brighton, Apr 25". The Argus.
- Loomes, Naiomi (5 November 2007). "The Maydays, Komedia, Brighton, Nov 3". The Argus.
- Robertson, Louise (14 March 2010). "Improv group uses Surrey Comet for comedic gold at Kingston Rose Theatre". Surrey Comet.
- "#ChicaGoUK: Jason Blackwater". The Crunchy Frog Collective. 25 June 2012.
