= BATS Improv =

- Founded: 1986
- Website: improv.org
- Formerly called: Bay Area Theatresports

BATS Improv (formerly known as "Bay Area Theatresports") is a non-profit improvisational theatre company in San Francisco. Founded in 1986, their unique style of acting-based improvisational theatre is well known in improv circles around the world. BATS is the largest improvisational theatre company and school in Northern California.

== Philosophy ==
BATS takes its inspiration from the work of Theatresports creator Keith Johnstone and from San Francisco's own tradition of experimental improvisation.

== History ==
Since 1986, BATS helped create and define a unique San Francisco style of long-form improvisation: a single-story 2-hour show, complete with intermission.

== Bayfront Theater ==
BATS is in residence at the 200-seat Bayfront Theater at historic Fort Mason Center in San Francisco and performs and offers classes year round.

== Programs ==
In addition, BATS runs a successful corporate training program, performs improv in schools as a popular participant in the Bay Area's Young Audiences program, and provides free improv workshops through its Laughing Stock program to people living with HIV, AIDS, hepatitis C, cancer, and other chronic, life-threatening illness.

== Performers and alumni ==
Notable BATS performers and alumni include:

- Greg Proops
- Masi Oka
- Gerri Lawlor
- William Hall

== See also ==
- Fratelli Bologna
