= The Suggestibles =

British comedy group

The Suggestibles is a British improv comedy group, based in Newcastle upon Tyne.

== History ==
The group's roots can be traced to the 1990s, when its founder members Bev Fox and Ian McLaughlin helped create, with Alan Marriott, The Improv Musical, which ran for c. 10 years playing at venues such as the Donmar and Fortune Theatre. They formed The Suggestibles in 2003 at the Live Theatre.

As of 2011, the group has a core team of players comprising Bev Fox, Ian McLaughlin, Rob Atkinson, Carl Kennedy and Gary Kitching. They are usually accompanied by musician Alex Ross on piano, and often a special guest from other improv companies. Their shows typically comprise two hours of improv games, short forms, and music, all at the suggestion of the audience.

The group present annually their "Impro Pantso", an improvised Christmas Pantomime led by audience suggestion, that was in its 9th year as of 2016. The adults-only show, which is different every night, performed at venues including the Northern Stage and the Cumberland Arms, is known as one of the "most popular" attractions in Newcastle.

The Suggestibles also tour additional venues including Gala Theatre in Durham, Seaton Deleval Arts Centre, Hexham Queens Hall, Washington Arts Centre and Alnwick Playhouse. and have performed monthly at The Cumberland Arms in the Ouseburn Valley since 2011 and monthly at The Stand Comedy Club. The group also played regular residencies at The Hyena, Black Swan and The Mixer in Jesmond. They have also performed at Bristol Jam, an annual improv festival held at the Bristol Old Vic, since its inception in 2009.

Writing in The Guardian in 2007, Alfred Hickling called the group one of the "hottest comedy tickets in the north-east". The Suggestibles won a Royal Television Society Award for Pour Quoi (a skit on Parkour), which had c. 1 million internet views.

Fox and McLaughlin also teach improv skills for personal and business development, as Suggestibles' School of Improv.
