= William Hall (actor) =

American actor

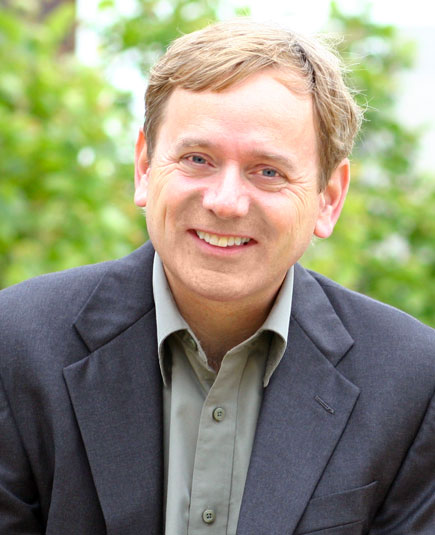
- Occupations: Actor; director; trainer; mask maker; editor

William Hall is an American actor, director, trainer and mask maker in San Francisco, California. He is the editor of The Playbook, Improv Games for Performers.

Hall first became involved in acting when he took a drama class while attending Maggie L. Walker High School in Richmond, Virginia. He went on to obtain a Bachelor of Fine Arts in Acting from Boston University, where he was classmates with Geena Davis. After graduation, Hall came to San Francisco to pursue theater.

He has appeared in film and television including The Right Stuff, Twisted, Howard the Duck and Midnight Caller. He was one of the Nazis in the final ark scene in Raiders of the Lost Ark.

Hall is one of the founding members of BATS Improv, an improvisational theatre, and the last remaining “OB” (original brother) of Fratelli Bologna.

== Filmography ==
Year	Title	Role
1983	Twice Upon a Time	Rusher of Din - Sleeper
1983	The Right Stuff	The Permanent Press Corps
1985	Trouble in Mind	Long Militiaman
1986	Howard the Duck	Officer Hanson
1987	Leonard Part 6	Monroe
1989	Wildfire	Bank Cop
1995	Murder in the First	Man on the Street
1997	Fathers' Day	Hotel Clerk
2004	Twisted	Chip Marshall
2006	Valley of the Heart's Delight	Phil Cobb
2012	Hemingway & Gellhorn	Second Journalist

== Notes ==
- The Improv Playbook – 370 games for improv performers
