= Comedy Arts Theater of Charlotte =

Theater in North Carolina, US

Coordinates: 35°11′11.7″N 80°52′35.3″W

The Comedy Arts Theater of Charlotte, often abbreviated as CATCh, is an improv theater located in the Lower Southend (LoSo) neighborhood of Charlotte, North Carolina, United States. The theater teaches and hosts performances of improvisational theatre. It was founded in 2016 by Abigail Head and Kevin Shimko. CATCh focuses primarily on longform improv, and teaches a patient, character-driven, and theatrical style of scene work.

== History ==
CATCh opened its first permanent venue at 4200 South Blvd in Charlotte on February 8, 2019. During COVID, the theater moved its location to a larger space in the same complex at 4128 South Blvd in Charlotte, where it continues to operate.

Kevin Shimko exited ownership and operation of the theater in December 2023.
