= Jet City Improv =

Coordinates: 47°40′08″N 122°18′46″W

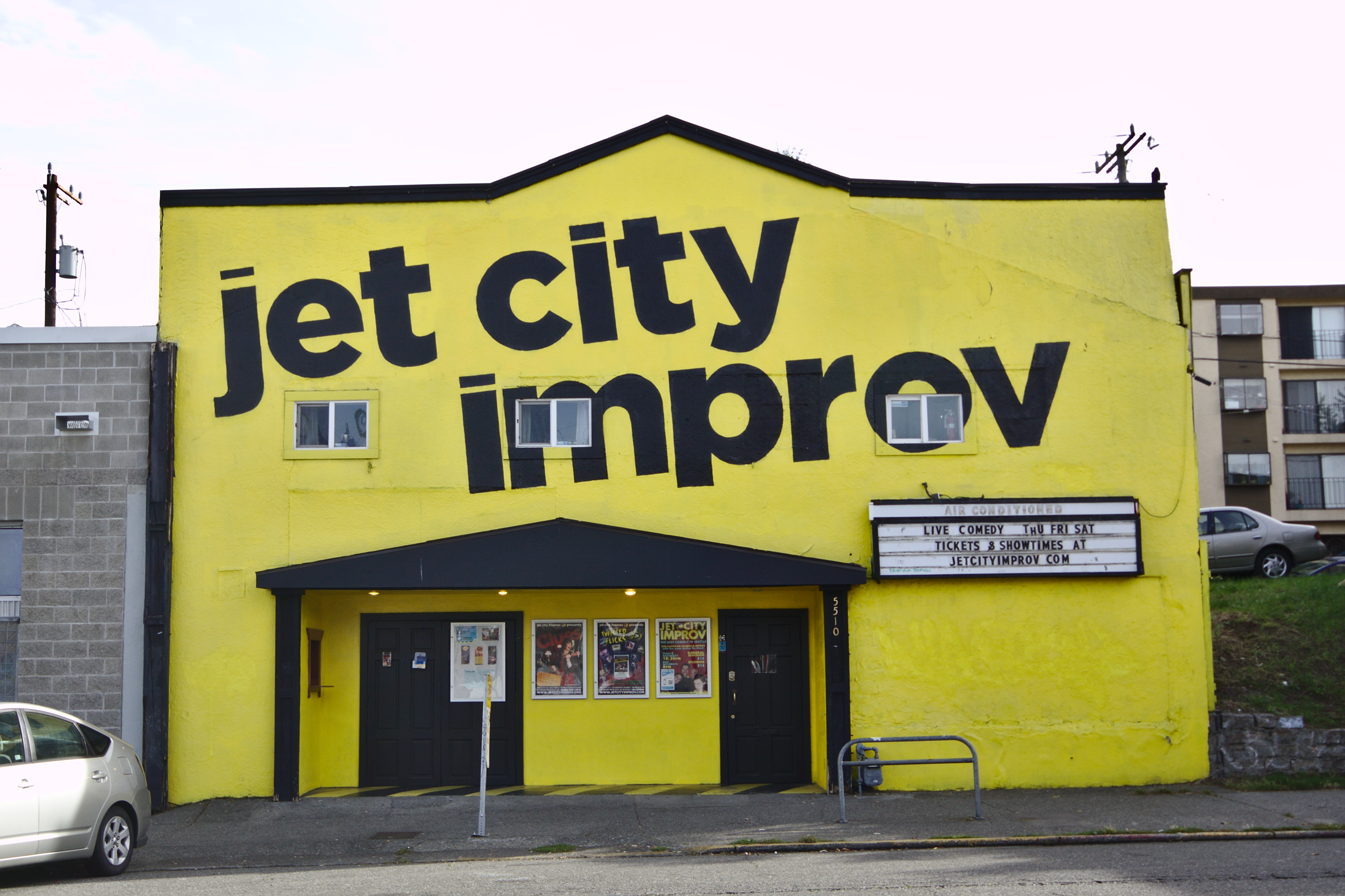
- The front of Jet City Improv, from across University Ave.
- Formation: March 18, 1992; 34 years ago
- Type: Non-profit
- Parent organization: Wing-It Productions
- Website: jetcityimprov.com

Jet City Improv is an Improvisational theatre troupe from Seattle, Washington, United States. The troupe was founded in 1992 and is operated by Wing-It Productions, a 501(c)(3) non-profit company.

== History ==
Jet City Improv was founded in 1992 by Mike Christensen and Andrew McMasters and debuted with a free show on March 18, 1992, at the Second Story Studios in Seattle. In July 1993, Jet City Improv began performing every Friday night at the Northwest Actors Studio, later moving to the Belltown Theater Center in October 1994.

In December 1994, Christensen and McMasters founded Wing-It Productions to take on the production of Jet City Improv's activities. In 1997, the troupe relocated performances to the Ethnic Cultural Theater on the University of Washington campus. In 2002, Jet City premiered its first improvised longform production, The Lost Folio. In 2003, the company took over the lease to the former Paradox Theater, renaming it the Historic University Theater, which served as Jet City's home for nearly two decades. During that period Jet City developed signature formats such as Twisted Flicks and hosted the Seattle Festival of Improv Theater.

In 2019, the building housing the Historic University Theater was sold to new owners. The COVID-19 pandemic forced Jet City Improv to suspend in-person performances in 2020, and the company vacated the building soon after. The venue was later destroyed in a fire after the organization had moved out.

Following the closure, Jet City Improv transitioned into a multi-venue model. Performances were relocated to the University Heights Center in Seattle's University District and West of Lenin Theater in Fremont. The move allowed the company to expand programming, add rehearsal and classroom space, and partner with other arts organizations while continuing to produce a full season of shows.
