= HUGE Improv Theater =

Theater in Minneapolis, Minnesota, US

- HUGE's logo
- Formation: 2005
- Dissolved: October 30, 2024; 2 years ago
- Type: Nonprofit
- Purpose: Long form improvisational theater
- Location(s): 2728 Lyndale Ave S. Minneapolis, MN 55408
- Coordinates: 44.947091°N 93.287932°W
- Region served: Minneapolis – Saint Paul
- Key people: Butch Roy (Co-Executive Director and Facilities Manager); John Gebretatose (Co-Executive Director and Director of Diversity and Inclusion); Jill Bernard (Education Director); Becky Wilkinson Hauser (Artistic Director); Sean Dillon (Managing Director)
- Website: www.hugetheater.com

HUGE Improv Theater was a Minneapolis artist-led non-profit theater company founded in 2005 by improvisers Jill Bernard, Butch Roy, Nels Lennes, Joe Bozic and Mike Fotis, dedicated to long-form improvisational theater.

HUGE's presence accelerated the growth of improvised theater and comedy in the Twin Cities, offering 500+ performances annually while training thousands of new improvisers and teaching 600+ students each year. HUGE closed in October 2024.

== History ==
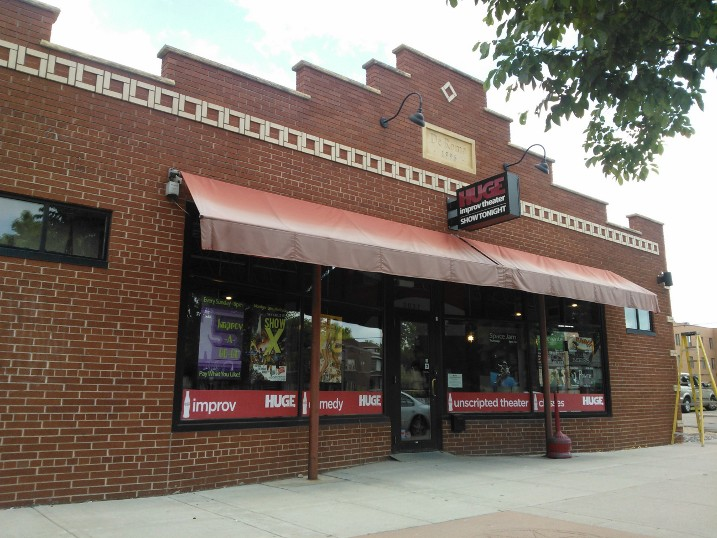
HUGE's building in 2013

HUGE began in 2005 as a collective of artists producing new improvised works at various venues throughout the Twin Cities of Minneapolis and Saint Paul. Responding to growth in audience demand and widespread interest in improv classes, HUGE was incorporated as a 501(c)3 nonprofit in 2009 and opened the doors of its first long-term home (a 100-seat theater/education venue at 3037 Lyndale Avenue, Minneapolis) in 2010, managed by Roy, Lennes and Bernard, who also served as the first Board of Directors, later joined by Molly Chase. At the time HUGE was the only theater in the Twin Cities dedicated exclusively to long-form improvisation.

In August 2017, a story in City Pages reported that HUGE's landlord, Julius Jaeger De Roma, donated $500 to former Ku Klux Klan leader David Duke's 2016 campaign for a U.S. Senate seat in Louisiana. Upon this revelation, HUGE's board of directors denounced De Roma and began conversations about moving the theater to a new space. In May 2019, HUGE announced a capital campaign to fund the eventual purchase of its own facility.

As of 2019, HUGE produced around 600 shows per year with an annual operating budget of $540,000. The theater closed in October 2024, citing financial difficulties.

== Shows and classes ==
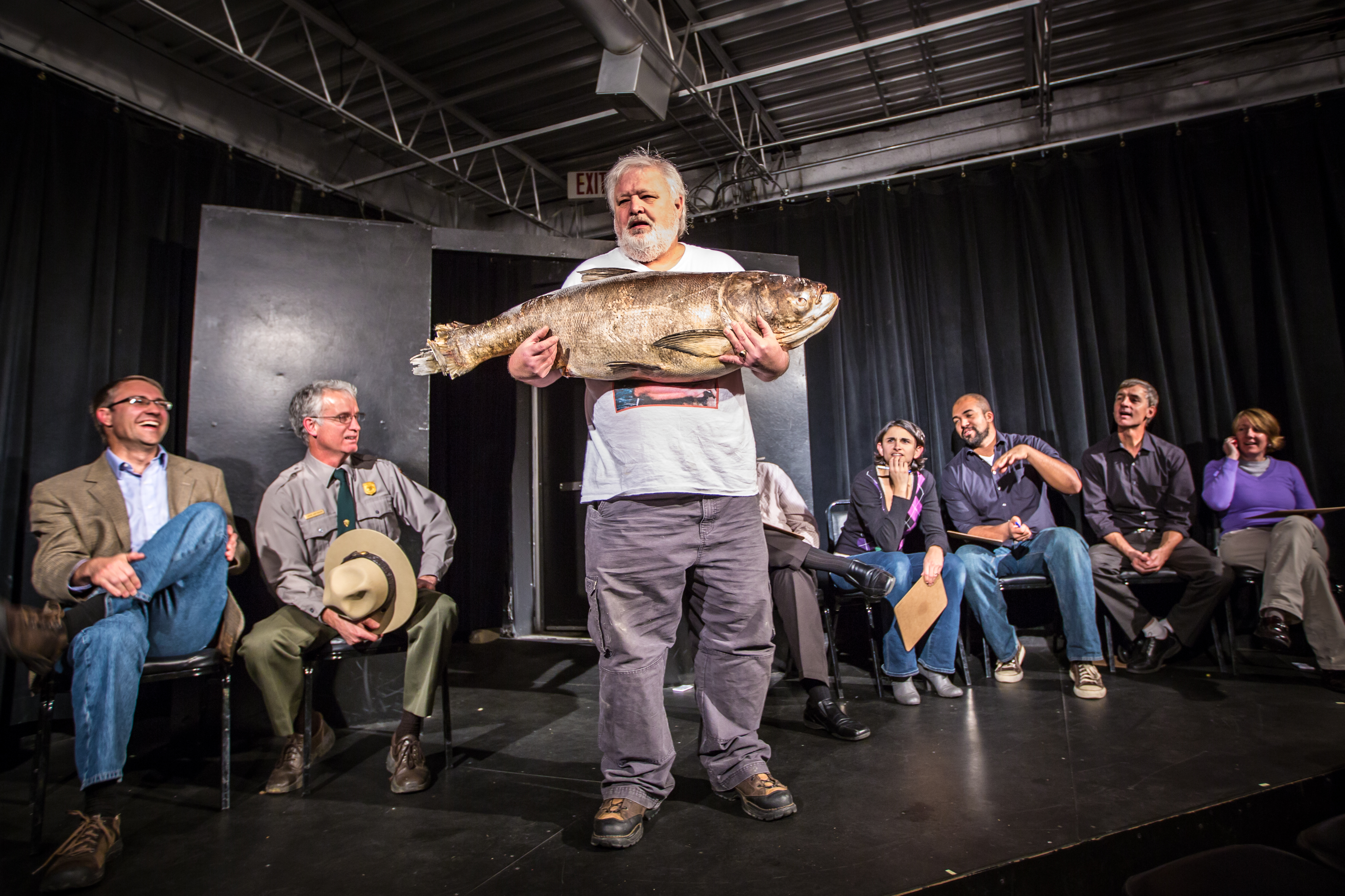
A show on HUGE's stage

HUGE ran improv shows six nights per week. The theater also hosted classes for beginning improv students and workshops for more advanced improvisers. HUGE was the site of the annual Twin Cities Improv Festival, a creation of the theater's staff designed to increase the presence of improvised theater in the Twin Cities. It also hosted independent improv festivals such as the Black & Funny Improv Festival and Queer & Funny Improv Festival.
