= Harold (improvisation) =

Improv theatre format

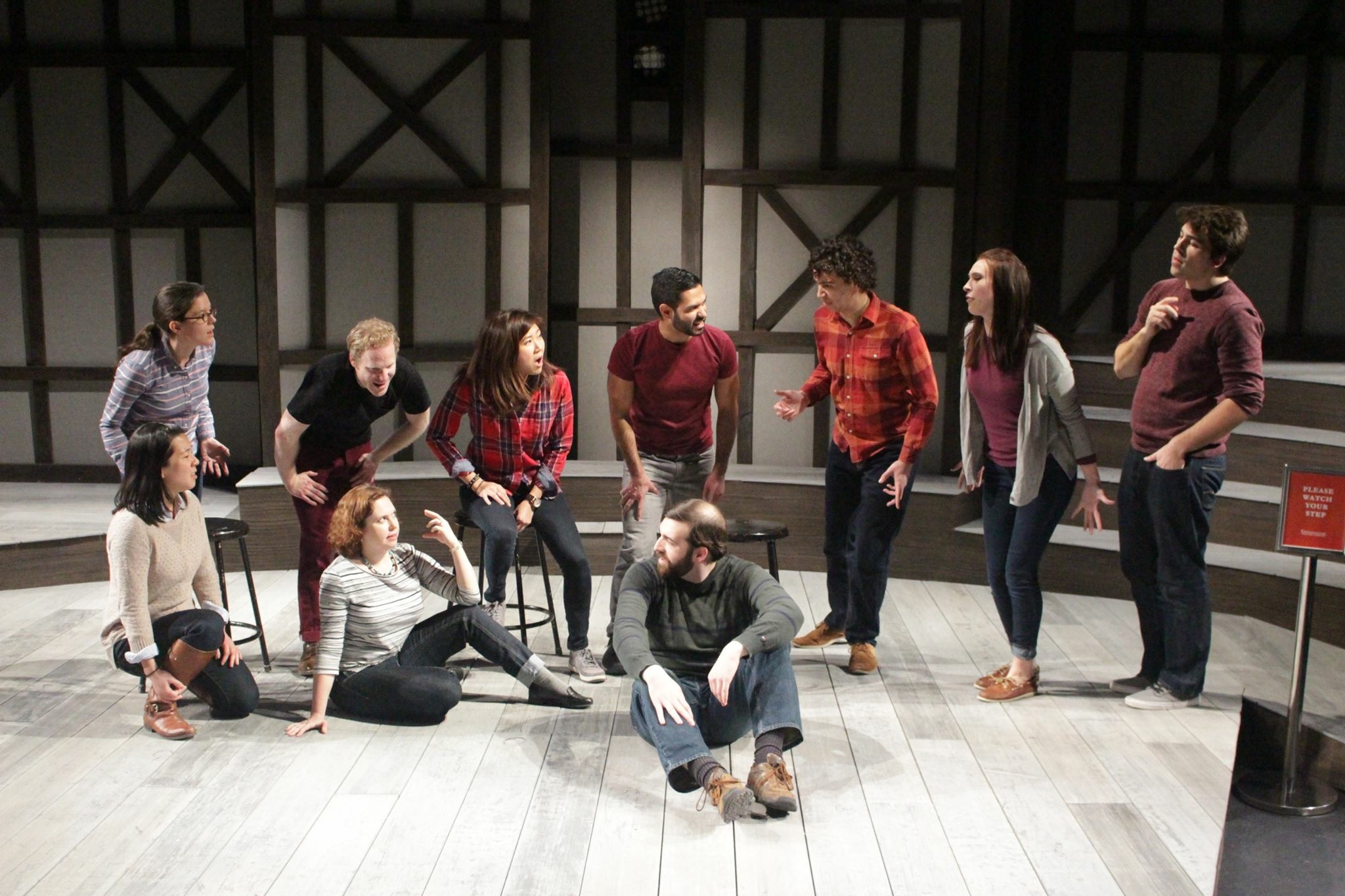
Harold performance at the Washington Improv Theater

Harold is a structure used in long-form improvisational theatre that is performed by improv troupes and teams across the world. In the Harold structure, characters and themes are introduced and then recur in a series of connected scenes. It was first performed in California by The Committee in 1967.

== History ==
The Committee, a San Francisco improv group, performed the first Harold in Concord, California, in 1967. They were invited to a high school and decided to do their improvisations on the war in Vietnam. On the way home in a Volkswagen bus, they were discussing the performance, when one of them asked what they should call it. Allaudin (Bill) Mathieu (W.A. Mathieu) called out "Harold", which was a joking reference to a line from A Hard Day's Night where a reporter asks George Harrison what he calls his haircut and he answers "Arthur". The form was further developed by improv teachers Del Close and Charna Halpern, as well as the Upright Citizens Brigade.

When The Committee disbanded in 1972, improv company Improvisation, Inc. was the only company in America continuing to perform the group's "original" Harold: a 45-minute free-form piece that would seamlessly move from one "Harold technique" to another. In 1974, in Los Angeles, former Committee member Gary Austin co-founded The Groundlings, using improv-as-a-tool. In 1976, two former Improvisation, Inc. performers, Michael Bossier and John Elk, formed Spaghetti Jam, performing in San Francisco's Old Spaghetti Factory through 1983. Spaghetti Jam performed Harolds while also turning Spolin games and Harold techniques into standalone performance pieces (i.e., short-form improv).

The 1994 book Truth in Comedy describes a "training wheels Harold" as three acts (or "beats"), each with three scenes and a group segment. With each beat, the three scenes return. By the end of the piece, the three scenes have converged.

== Format structure ==
The Harold's format is explained in 2013 book The Upright Citizens Brigade: Comedy Improvisation Manual. This long-form is typically performed by six to nine improvisors and begins with a suggestion from the audience that is dissected for premises in an opening, such as the pattern game, the invocation, or a monologue.

The Harold performance is composed of three beats consisting of three scenes each. Each beat should be followed by a group game that involves all performers. The first beat typically consists of three two person scenes that are all distinct and are not connected, the second beat repeats each scene from the first beat and further explores the games found in those previous scenes, and the third beat continues to further heighten the games from the previous beats, but these scenes should be shorter than in previous beats. In the first two beats, all of the scenes should be disconnected, or separate from each other, but in the third beat, when performing a scene, the improvisors may make connections between the scenes by incorporating characters or elements from other scenes. Ideally, the third beat is a single scene that incorporates all three games.

An example of how a typical Harold long-form might be structured is as follows:

- Suggestion from audience.
- Opening
- 1st Beat
  - Scene 1A
  - Scene 1B
  - Scene 1C
- Group Game
- 2nd Beat
  - Scene 2A
  - Scene 2B
  - Scene 2C
- Group Game
- 3rd Beat
  - Scene 3ABC

== Modified Harolds ==
Some modern improv forms are Harolds with an added requirement. These include:

- Monoscene – Originally and occasionally still Harold set in one location
- Sybil – Harold performed by a solo performer
- The Bat – Harold performed in the dark
- The Armando – A Harold performed with a guest monologist telling true stories

== Bibliography ==
- Fotis, Matt (2014). Long Form Improvisation and American Comedy: The Harold. Palgrave Macmillan. ISBN 9781137376589.
