= Theatresports =

Competitive improvisational theatre

Theatresports is a form of improvisational theatre, which uses the format of a competition for dramatic effect. Opposing teams can perform scenes based on audience suggestions, with ratings by the audience or by a panel of judges. Developed by director Keith Johnstone in Calgary, Alberta, in 1977, the concept of Theatresports originated in Johnstone's observations of techniques used in professional wrestling to generate heat, or audience reaction.

== Derivatives ==
ComedySportz, started in 1984 in Milwaukee, WI, tends to emphasise the sports competition format more than Theatresports, for example by having a referee who awards points and administers fouls. The Australian shows Thank God You're Here and TheatreGames LIVE follow a similar format to these shows. New York City's Face Off Unlimited has also adapted the concept to numerous productions. Two similar formats, Ligue nationale d'improvisation and Canadian Improv Games both also officially debuted in 1977 in Quebec and Ontario, respectively. The Canadian Improv Games had been doing competitive improv at various events as early as 1974.

== See also ==
- Theatre games

== Sources ==
- Johnstone, Keith (1987). Impro: Improvisation and the Theatre. Taylor & Francis. ISBN 0-87830-117-8.
- Johnstone, Keith (1999). Impro For Storytellers. Faber UK. ISBN 0-571-19099-5 (paperback).
- A Guide to Keith Johnstone's Theatresports (2017). Published by the International Theatresports Institute, Calgary, Canada.
- Keith Johnstone on the origins of Theatresports and how a typical show runs.
- "Theatre, English-Language". The Canadian Encyclopedia. Historica Foundation of Canada, 2006.
- Clark, Andrew (1999). "Comedians Without a Net". Maclean's, 1999-09-08, Vol. 112, Issue 32.
- Sillars, Les. "The Global Moose". Alberta Report, 1995-08-28, Vol. 22 Issue 37, pp36–37.
- "Unscripted", Chris Wiebe, Alberta Views magazine, September 2005.
