= Improvisational theatre =

Theatrical genre featuring unscripted performance

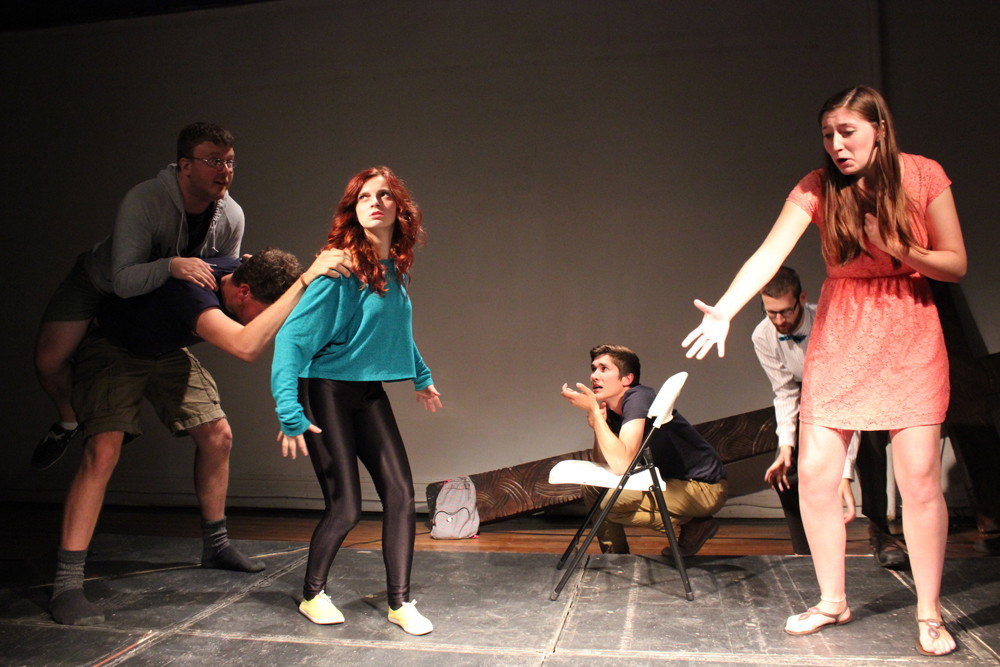
Canadian actors acting longform improv in Winnipeg.

Improvisational theatre, often called improvisation, improv, or impro in British English, is the form of theatre, often comedy, in which most or all of what is performed is unplanned or unscripted, created spontaneously by the performers. In its purest form, the dialogue, action, story, and characters are created collaboratively by the players as the improvisation unfolds in present time, without use of an already prepared, written script.

Improvisational theatre exists in performance as a range of styles of improvisational comedy as well as some non-comedic theatrical performances. It is sometimes used in film and television, both to develop characters and scripts and occasionally as part of the final product.

Improvisational techniques are often used extensively in drama programs to train actors for stage, film, and television and can be an important part of the rehearsal process. However, the skills and processes of improvisation are also used outside the context of performing arts. This practice, known as applied improvisation, is used in classrooms as an educational tool and in businesses as a way to develop communication skills, creative problem solving, and supportive team-work abilities that are used by improvisational, ensemble players. It is sometimes used in psychotherapy as a tool to gain insight into a person's thoughts, feelings, and relationships.

== History ==
The earliest well-documented use of improvisational theatre in Western history is found in the Atellan Farce of 391 BC. From the 16th to the 18th centuries, commedia dell'arte performers improvised based on a broad outline in the streets of Italy. In the 1890s, theatrical theorists and directors such as the Russian Konstantin Stanislavski and the French Jacques Copeau, founders of two major streams of acting theory, both heavily utilized improvisation in acting training and rehearsal.

=== Modern ===
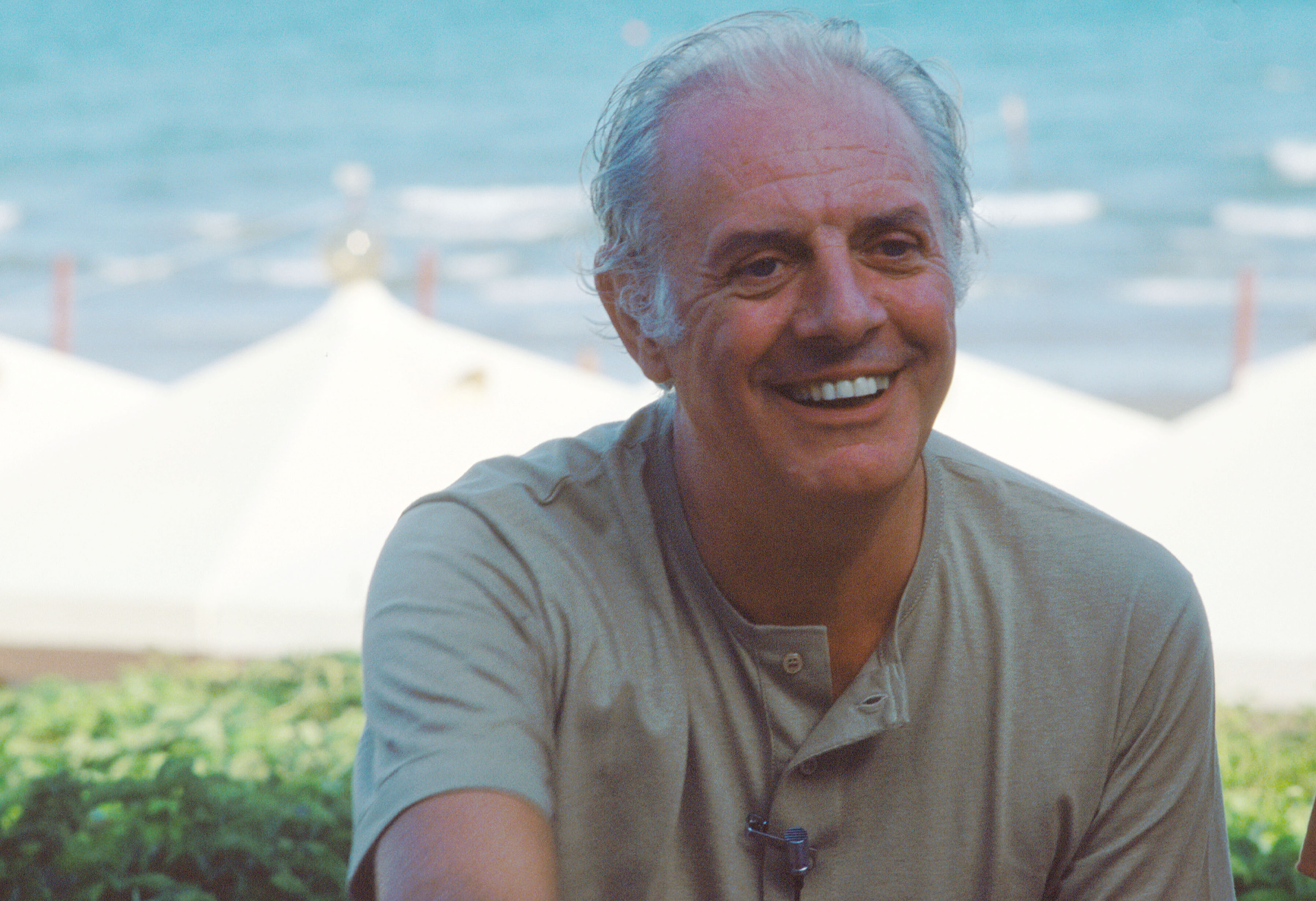
Italian Nobel-winner Dario Fo received international acclaim for his highly improvisational style

Modern theatrical improvisation games began as drama exercises for children, which were a staple of drama education in the early 20th century thanks in part to the progressive education movement initiated by John Dewey in 1916.

In 1922 psychotherapist Jacob L. Moreno founded "Das Stegreiftheater" (Theatre of Spontaneity) in Vienna, his 1924 book of the same name outlined his theoretical concepts. He also invented his own improvised theatrical form of the "Living Newspaper". Moreno moved to New York in 1925 and established his "Impromptu Theater" at Carnegie Hall in 1929, while continuing to develop psychodrama and sociodrama.

Some people credit American Dudley Riggs as the first vaudevillian to use audience suggestions to create improvised sketches on stage. Improvisation exercises were developed further by Viola Spolin in the 1940s, '50s, and '60s, and codified in her book Improvisation For The Theater, the first book that gave specific techniques for learning to do and teach improvisational theatre. In 1977, Clive Barker's book Theatre Games (several translations and editions) spread the ideas of improv internationally. British playwright and director Keith Johnstone wrote Impro: Improvisation and the Theatre, a book outlining his ideas on improvisation, and invented Theatresports, which has become a staple of modern improvisational comedy and is the inspiration for the popular television show Whose Line Is It Anyway?

Viola Spolin influenced the first generation of modern American improvisers at The Compass Players in Chicago, which led to The Second City. Her son, Paul Sills, along with David Shepherd, started The Compass Players. Following the demise of the Compass Players, Paul Sills began The Second City. They were the first organized improv troupes in Chicago, and the modern Chicago improvisational comedy movement grew from their success.

Many of the current "rules" of comedic improv were first formalized in Chicago in the late 1950s and early 1960s, initially among The Compass Players troupe, which was directed by Paul Sills. From most accounts, David Shepherd provided the philosophical vision of the Compass Players, while Elaine May was central to the development of the premises for its improvisations. Mike Nichols, Ted Flicker, and Del Close were her most frequent collaborators in this regard. When The Second City opened its doors on December 16, 1959, directed by Paul Sills, his mother Viola Spolin began training new improvisers through a series of classes and exercises which became the cornerstone of modern improv training. By the mid-1960s, Viola Spolin's classes were handed over to her protégé, Jo Forsberg, who further developed Spolin's methods into a one-year course, which eventually became The Players Workshop, the first official school of improvisation in the United States. During this time, Forsberg trained many of the performers who went on to star on The Second City stage.

Many of the original cast of Saturday Night Live came from The Second City, and the franchise has produced such comedy stars as Mike Myers, Tina Fey, Bob Odenkirk, Amy Sedaris, Stephen Colbert, Eugene Levy, Jack McBrayer, Steve Carell, Chris Farley, Dan Aykroyd, and John Belushi.

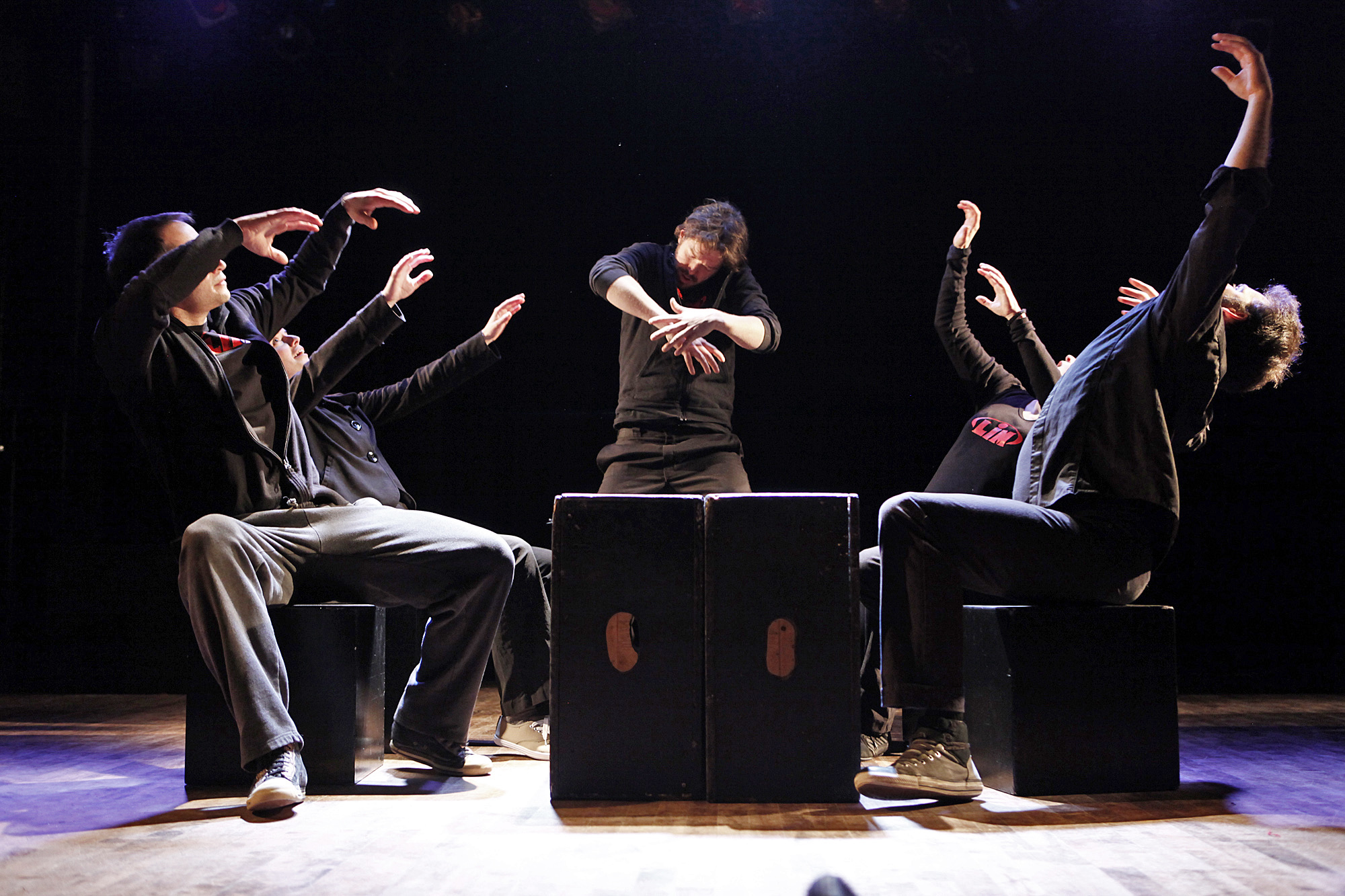
Members of the Montreal Improvisation League

Simultaneously, Keith Johnstone's group The Theatre Machine, which originated in London, was touring Europe. This work gave birth to Theatresports, at first secretly in Johnstone's workshops, and eventually in public when he moved to Calgary. Toronto has been home to a rich improv tradition.

In 1984, Dick Chudnow (Kentucky Fried Theater) founded ComedySportz in Milwaukee, WI. Expansion began with the addition of ComedySportz-Madison (WI), in 1985. The first Comedy League of America National Tournament was held in 1988, with 10 teams participating. The league is now known as CSz Worldwide and boasts a roster of 29 international cities.

In San Francisco, The Committee theater was active in North Beach during the 1960s. It was founded by alumni of Chicago's Second City, Alan Myerson and his wife Jessica. When The Committee disbanded in 1972, three major companies were formed: The Pitchell Players, The Wing, and Improvisation Inc. The only company that continued to perform Close's Harold was the latter one. Its two former members, Michael Bossier and John Elk, formed Spaghetti Jam in San Francisco's Old Spaghetti Factory Cafe in 1976, where shortform improv and Harolds were performed through 1983. Stand-up comedians performing down the street at the Intersection for the Arts would drop by and sit in. In 1979, Elk brought shortform to England, teaching workshops at Jacksons Lane Theatre, and he was the first American to perform at The Comedy Store, London, above a Soho strip club.

Modern political improvisation's roots include Jerzy Grotowski's work in Poland during the late 1950s and early 1960s, Peter Brook's "happenings" in England during the late 1960s, Augusto Boal's "Forum Theatre" in South America in the early 1970s, and San Francisco's The Diggers' work in the 1960s. Some of this work led to pure improvisational performance styles, while others simply added to the theatrical vocabulary and were, on the whole, avant-garde experiments.

Joan Littlewood, an English actress and director who was active from the 1950s to 1960s, made extensive use of improv in developing plays for performance. However, she was successfully prosecuted twice for allowing her actors to improvise in performance. Until 1968, British law required scripts to be approved by the Lord Chamberlain's Office. The department also sent inspectors to some performances to check that the approved script was performed exactly as approved.

In 1987, Annoyance Theatre began as a club in Chicago that emphasizes longform improvisation. The Annoyance Theatre has grown into multiple locations in Chicago and New York City. It is the home of the longest running musical improv show in history at 11 years.

In 2012, Lebanese writer and director Lucien Bourjeily used improvisational theatre techniques to create a multi-sensory play entitled 66 Minutes in Damascus. This play premiered at the London International Festival of Theatre, and is consideyperreal sensory environment.

Rob Wittig and Mark C. Marino have developed a form of improv for online theatrical improvisation called netprov. The form relies on social media to engage audiences in the creation of dynamic fictional scenarios that evolve in real-time.

== Comedy ==
Three improvisers performing longform improv comedy at the Gorilla Tango Theatre in Chicago.

Modern improvisational comedy, as is practiced in the West, falls generally into two categories: shortform and longform.

Shortform improv consists of short scenes usually constructed from a predetermined game, structure, or idea and driven by an audience suggestion. Many shortform exercises were first created by Viola Spolin, who called them theatre games, influenced by her training from recreational games expert Neva Boyd. One example of a game would be performers creating a scene and a "director" performer pointing to one performer after a line repeatedly. Each time, the performer being pointed to will rewind and say a new line. The shortform improv comedy television series Whose Line Is It Anyway? has familiarized American and British viewers with shortform.

Longform improv performers create shows in which short scenes are often interrelated by story, characters, or themes. Longform shows may take the form of an existing type of theatre, for example a full-length play or Broadway-style musical such as Spontaneous Broadway. One of the better-known longform structures is the Harold, developed by ImprovOlympic co-founder Del Close. Many such longform structures now exist. Actors such as Will Ferrell, Tina Fey, and Steve Carell found their start in longform improv.

Longform improvisation is especially performed in Chicago, New York City, Los Angeles, Austin, Atlanta, Dallas, Boston, Minneapolis, Phoenix, Philadelphia, San Francisco, Seattle, Detroit, Toronto, Vancouver, and Washington, D.C., and is building a growing following in Baltimore, Denver, Kansas City, Montreal, Columbus, New Orleans, Omaha, Rochester, NY, and Hawaii. Outside the United States, longform improv has a growing presence in the United Kingdom, especially in cities such as London, Bristol, Glasgow, and at the Edinburgh Festival Fringe.

== Non-comedic, experimental, and dramatic, narrative-based improvisational theatre ==
Other forms of improvisational theatre training and performance techniques are experimental and avant-garde in nature and not necessarily intended to be comedic. These include Playback Theatre and Theatre of the Oppressed, the Poor Theatre, The Open Theater, to name only a few.

The Open Theater was founded in New York City by a group of former students of acting teacher Nola Chilton, and joined shortly thereafter by director Joseph Chaikin, formerly of The Living Theatre, and Peter Feldman. This avant-garde theatre group explored political, artistic, and social issues. The company, developing work through an improvisational process drawn from Chilton and Viola Spolin, created well-known exercises, such as "sound and movement" and "transformations", and originated radical forms and techniques that anticipated or were contemporaneous with Jerzy Grotowski's "poor theatre" in Poland. During the sixties, Chaikin and the Open Theatre developed full theatrical productions with nothing but the actors, a few chairs, and a bare stage, creating character, time, and place through a series of transformations the actors physicalized and discovered through improvisations.

On the west coast, Ruth Zaporah developed Action Theatre, a physically based improvisation form that treats language, movement and voice equally. Action Theatre performances have no scripts, no preplanned ideas and create full-length shows or shorter performances. Longform, dramatic, and narrative-based improvisation is well-established on the west coast with companies such as San Francisco's BATS Improv. This format allows for full-length plays and musicals to be created improvisationally.

== Applying improv principles in life ==
Beginning in the late 90's, the field of applied improvisation was born as a way to use improv as a tool outside of the performative space and many people who have studied improv have noted that the guiding principles of improv are useful, not just on stage, but in everyday life. For example, Stephen Colbert in a commencement address said,

Well, you are about to start the greatest improvisation of all. With no script. No idea what's going to happen, often with people and places you have never seen before. And you are not in control. So say "yes." And if you're lucky, you'll find people who will say "yes" back.

Tina Fey, in her book Bossypants, lists several rules of improv that apply in the workplace. There has been much interest in bringing lessons from improv into the corporate world. In a New York Times article titled "Can Executives Learn to Ignore the Script?", Stanford professor and author, Patricia Ryan Madson notes, "executives and engineers and people in transition are looking for support in saying yes to their own voice. Often, the systems we put in place to keep us secure are keeping us from our more creative selves."

== In film and television ==
Many directors have made use of improvisation in the creation of both mainstream and experimental films. Many silent filmmakers such as Charlie Chaplin and Buster Keaton used improvisation in the making of their films, developing their gags while filming and altering the plot to fit. The Marx Brothers were notorious for deviating from the script they were given, their ad libs often becoming part of the standard routine and making their way into their films. Many people, however, make a distinction between ad-libbing and improvising.

The British director Mike Leigh makes extensive use of improvisation in the creation of his films, including improvising important moments in the characters' lives that will not even appear in the film. This Is Spinal Tap and other mockumentary films of director Christopher Guest were created with a mix of scripted and unscripted material. Blue in the Face is a 1995 comedy directed by Wayne Wang and Paul Auster created in part by the improvisations during the filming of Smoke.

Some of the best known American film directors who used improvisation in their work with actors are Robert Altman, Christopher Guest, and Rob Reiner.

Improv comedy techniques have also been used in hit television shows such as HBO's Curb Your Enthusiasm created by Larry David, the UK Channel 4 and ABC television series Whose Line Is It Anyway (and its spinoffs Drew Carey's Green Screen Show and Drew Carey's Improv-A-Ganza), Nick Cannon's improv comedy show Wild 'n Out, and Thank God You're Here. A very early American improv television program was the weekly half-hour What Happens Now? which premiered on New York's WOR-TV on October 15, 1949, and ran for 22 episodes. "The Improvisers" were six actors (including Larry Blyden, Ross Martin, and Jean Alexander – Jean Pugsley at the time) who improvised skits based on situations suggested by viewers. In Canada, the series Train 48 was improvised from scripts which contained a minimal outline of each scene, and the comedy series This Sitcom Is...Not to Be Repeated incorporated dialogue drawn from a hat during the course of an episode. The American show Reno 911! also contained improvised dialogue based on a plot outline. Fast and Loose is an improvisational game show, much like Whose Line Is It Anyway? The BBC sitcoms Outnumbered and The Thick of It also had some improvised elements in them. Many shows on the streaming service Dropout are known for their improvisational elements, specifically Make Some Noise.

== Psychology ==
In the field of the psychology of consciousness, Eberhard Scheiffele explored the altered state of consciousness experienced by actors and improvisers in his scholarly paper Acting: an altered state of consciousness. According to G. William Farthing in The Psychology of Consciousness comparative study, actors routinely enter into an altered state of consciousness (ASC). Acting is seen as altering most of the 14 dimensions of changed subjective experience which characterize ASCs according to Farthing, namely: attention, perception, imagery and fantasy, inner speech, memory, higher-level thought processes, meaning or significance of experiences, time experience, emotional feeling and expression, level of arousal, self-control, suggestibility, body image, and sense of personal identity.

In the field of cognitive psychology and neuropsychology, improv seems to involve a lot of cognitive processes, especially attention. Improv can improve creativity, dealing with uncertainty, narrative skills and decrease anxiety in teenagers and younger and older adults.

In the growing field of drama therapy, psychodramatic improvisation, along with other techniques developed for drama therapy, are used extensively. The "Yes, and..." rule has been compared to Milton H. Erickson's utilization process and to a variety of acceptance-based psychotherapies. Improv training has been recommended for couples therapy and therapist training, and it has been speculated that improv training may be helpful in some cases of social anxiety disorder.

== Structure and process ==
Improvisational theatre often allows an interactive relationship with the audience. Improv groups frequently solicit suggestions from the audience as a source of inspiration, a way of getting the audience involved, and as a means of proving that the performance is not scripted. That charge is sometimes aimed at the masters of the art, whose performances can seem so detailed that viewers may suspect the scenes are planned.

In order for an improvised scene to be successful, the improvisers involved must work together responsively to define the parameters and action of the scene, in a process of co-creation. With each spoken word or action in the scene, an improviser makes an offer, meaning that he or she defines some element of the reality of the scene. This might include giving another character a name, identifying a relationship, location, or using mime to define the physical environment. These activities are also known as endowment. It is the responsibility of the other improvisers to accept the offers that their fellow performers make; to not do so is known as blocking, negation, or denial, which usually prevents the scene from developing. Some performers may deliberately block (or otherwise break out of character) for comedic effect—this is known as gagging—but this generally prevents the scene from advancing and is frowned upon by many improvisers. Accepting an offer is usually accompanied by adding a new offer, often building on the earlier one; this is a process improvisers refer to as Yes, and... and is considered the cornerstone of improvisational technique. Every new piece of information added helps the improvisers to refine their characters and progress the action of the scene. The Yes, and... rule, however, applies to a scene's early stage since it is in this stage that a "base (or shared) reality" is established in order to be later redefined by applying the "if (this is true), then (what else can also be true)" practice progressing the scene into comedy, as explained in the 2013 manual by the Upright Citizens Brigade members.

The unscripted nature of improv also implies no predetermined knowledge about the props that might be useful in a scene. Improv companies may have at their disposal some number of readily accessible props that can be called upon at a moment's notice, but many improvisers eschew props in favor of the infinite possibilities available through mime. In improv, this is more commonly known as 'space object work' or 'space work', rather than 'mime', and the props and locations created by this technique, as 'space objects' created out of 'space substance', developed as a technique by Viola Spolin. As with all improv 'offers', improvisers are encouraged to respect the validity and continuity of the imaginary environment defined by themselves and their fellow performers; this means, for example, taking care not to walk through the table or "miraculously" survive multiple bullet wounds from another improviser's gun.

Because improvisers may be required to play a variety of roles without preparation, they need to be able to construct characters quickly with physicality, gestures, accents, voice changes, or other techniques as demanded by the situation. The improviser may be called upon to play a character of a different age or sex. Character motivations are an important part of successful improv scenes, and improvisers must therefore attempt to act according to the objectives that they believe their character seeks.

In improv formats with multiple scenes, an agreed-upon signal is used to denote scene changes. Most often, this takes the form of a performer running in front of the scene, known as a "wipe". Tapping a character in or out can also be employed. The performers not currently part of the scene often stand at the side or back of the stage, and can enter or exit the scene by stepping into or out of the stage center.

== Community ==
Many theatre troupes are devoted to staging improvisational performances and growing the improv community through their training centers.

In addition to for-profit theatre troupes, there are many college-based improv groups in the United States and around the world.

In Europe the special contribution to the theatre of the abstract, the surreal, the irrational and the subconscious have been part of the stage tradition for centuries. From the 1990s onwards a growing number of European Improv groups have been set up specifically to explore the possibilities offered by the use of the abstract in improvised performance, including dance, movement, sound, music, mask work, lighting, and so on. These groups are not especially interested in comedy, either as a technique or as an effect, but rather in expanding the improv genre so as to incorporate techniques and approaches that have long been a legitimate part of European theatre.

== Notable contributors to the field ==
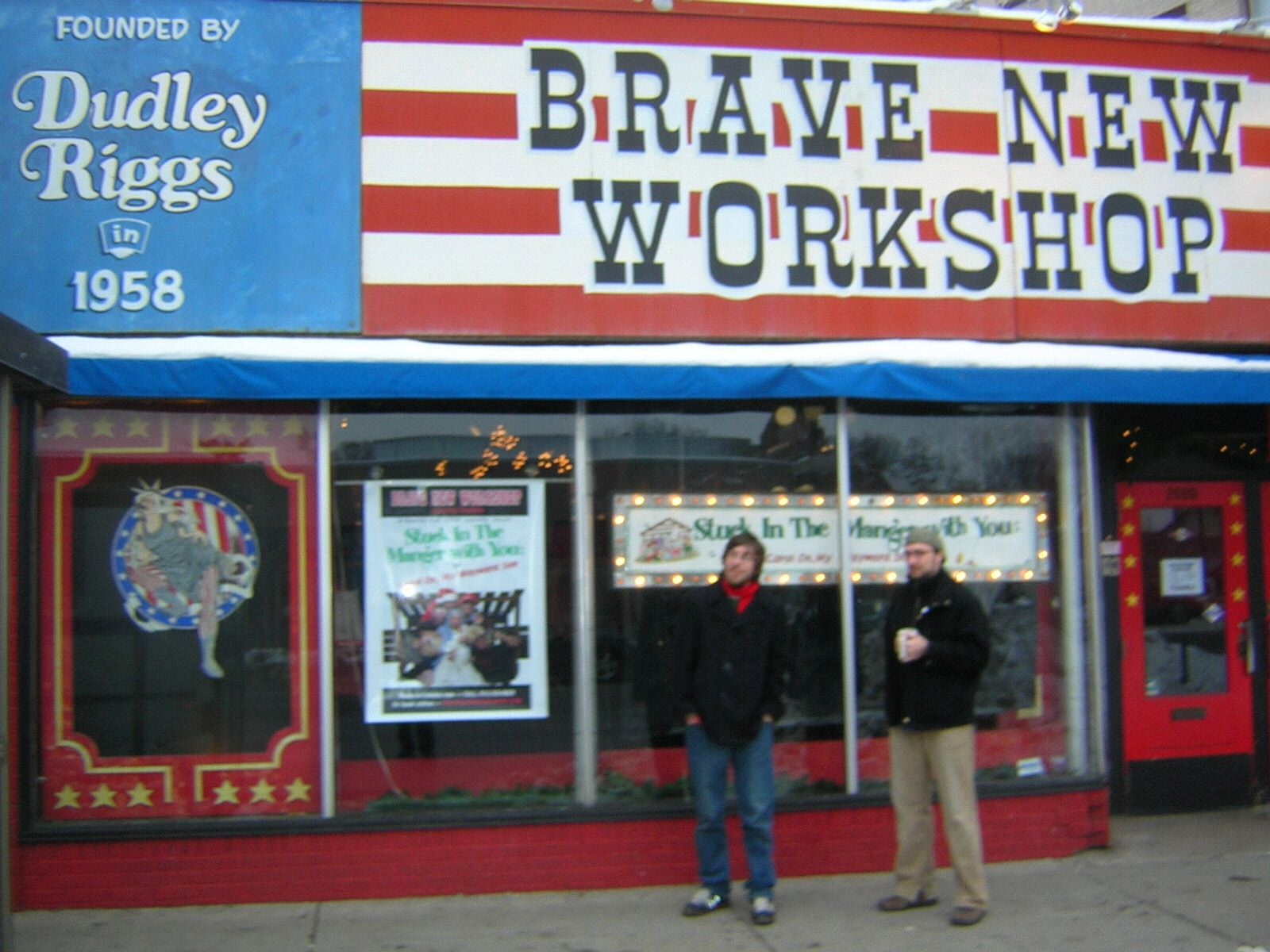
Two members of the Brave New Workshop in front of the former building in Minneapolis.

The Brave New Workshop Comedy Theater (BNW) is a sketch and improvisational comedy theatre based in Minneapolis, Minnesota. Started by Dudley Riggs in 1958, the artists of the BNW have been writing, performing and producing live sketch comedy and improvisation performances for 62 years – longer than any other theatre in the nation. Notable alumni of the BNW include Louie Anderson, Mo Collins, Tom Davis, Al Franken, Penn Jillette, Carl Lumbly, Paul Menzel, Pat Proft, Annie Reirson, Taylor Nikolai, Nancy Steen, Peter Tolan, Linda Wallem, Lizz Winstead, Peter MacNicol, Melissa Peterman, and Cedric Yarbrough.

Some key figures in the development of improvisational theatre are Viola Spolin and her son Paul Sills, founder of Chicago's famed Second City troupe and originator of theatre games, and Del Close, founder of ImprovOlympic (along with Charna Halpern) and creator of a popular longform improv format known as the Harold. Others include Keith Johnstone, the British teacher and writer–author of Impro, who founded the Theatre Machine and whose teachings form the foundation of the popular shortform Theatresports format, Dick Chudnow, founder of ComedySportz which evolved its family-friendly show format from Johnstone's Theatersports, and Bill Johnson, creator/director of The Magic Meathands, who pioneered the concept of "Commun-edy Outreach" by tailoring performances to non-traditional audiences, such as the homeless and foster children.

David Shepherd, with Paul Sills, founded the Compass Players in Chicago. Shepherd was intent on developing a true "people's Theatre", and hoped to bring political drama to the stockyards. The Compass went on to play in numerous forms and companies, in a number of cities including New York and Hyannis, after the founding of The Second City. A number of Compass members were also founding members of The Second City. In the 1970s, Shepherd began experimenting with group-created videos. He is the author of That Movie In Your Head, about these efforts. In the 1970s, David Shepherd and Howard Jerome created the Improvisational Olympics, a format for competition based improv. The Improv Olympics were first demonstrated at Toronto's Homemade Theatre in 1976 and have been continued on as the Canadian Improv Games. In the United States, the Improv Olympics were later produced by Charna Halpern under the name "ImprovOlympic" and now as "IO"; IO operates training centres and theatres in Chicago and Los Angeles. At IO, Halpern combined Shepherd's "Time Dash" game with Del Close's "Harold" game; the revised format for the Harold became the fundamental structure for the development of modern longform improvisation.

In 1975 Jonathan Fox founded Playback Theatre, a form of improvised community theatre which is often not comedic and replays stories as shared by members of the audience. Fox was influenced by Jacob L. Moreno's work in improvised theatre and psychodrama.

The Groundlings is a popular and influential improv theatre and training center in Los Angeles, California. The late Gary Austin, founder of The Groundlings, taught improvisation around the country, focusing especially in Los Angeles. He was widely acclaimed as one of the greatest acting teachers in America. His work was grounded in the lessons he learned as an improviser at The Committee with Del Close, as well as in his experiences as founding director of The Groundlings. The Groundlings is often seen as the Los Angeles training ground for the "second generation" of improv performers and troupes. Stan Wells developed the "Clap-In" style of longform improvisation here, later using this as the basis for his own theatre, The Empty Stage, which in turn bred multiple troupes utilizing this style. David Koff, one of Stan's longtime students has brought Stan's philosophies to longform improv and his Clap-In style of editing to his Change Through Play Improv Studio in Portland, Oregon where he uses it to train his students for the stage.

In the late 1990s, Matt Besser, Amy Poehler, Ian Roberts, and Matt Walsh founded the Upright Citizens Brigade Theatre in New York and later they founded one in Los Angeles, each with an accompanying improv/sketch comedy school. In September 2011 the UCB opened a third theatre in New York City's East Village, known as UCBeast.

Hoopla Impro are the founders of the longest running improv theatre in the UK. They also run an annual UK improv festival and improv marathon.

In 2015, The Free Association opened in London as a counterpart to American improv schools.

In 2016, The Glasgow Improv Theatre started putting on shows and teaching classes at The Old Hairdresser's bar in Glasgow, growing the improv scene in Scotland.

In 2017, Bristol Improv Theatre (BIT) became the first permanent venue in the South West dedicated to improvisational theatre. The Bristol Improv Theatre, was founded in 2012 and had been hosting shows, workshops and festivals across various Bristol venues before finding a home at The Polish Ex-Servicemen's Club in Clifton, Bristol since 2013. Through crowdfunding, fundraising events and private investment, the BIT took over the building and reopened the venue as the Bristol Improv Theatre on the 3rd March 2017.

Gunter Lösel compared the existing improvisational theatre theories (including Moreno, Spolin, Johnstone, and Close), structured them and wrote a general theory of improvisational theatre.

Alan Alda's book If I Understood You, Would I Have This Look on My Face? investigates the way in which improvisation improves communication in the sciences. The book is based on his work at Alan Alda Center for Communicating Science at Stony Brook University. The book has many examples of how improvisational theatre games can increase communication skills and develop empathy.

== See also ==
- Street performance
- Guerrilla theatre
- Improvisation
- List of improvisational theatre companies
- List of improvisational theater festivals
- Playback Theatre
