= The Naked Stage =

Annual theatre festival in Slovenia

Naked Stage / Goli oder is an international contemporary theatre festival, held annually in the last week of October in KUD France Prešeren, Ljubljana, Slovenia. Up until 2006, its focus has been the improvisational theatre. As of 2006, the festival is dedicated to improvisation in various fields of contemporary art. Naked Stage was designed and is organized by the most prominent Slovenian improv group, Narobov. Artistic directors of the Naked Stage are Maja Dekleva and Gregor Moder.

== Goals ==
The Naked Stage festival has two principal goals. It offers Slovenian and international audiences a profile of the most interesting progress in improvisational theatre. At the same time, it provides artists an opportunity to research new terrains in improvisational theatre through intense workshops. In the field of theatre, the festival is dedicated exclusively to longform improvisation, avoiding short games and formats. It is growing in is experimental extension, as premiers compose a noteworthy portion of all performances.

== History ==
=== 2005 ===
Invited theatres and special guests: Teater Narobov (Slovenia), Quicksilver Productions (Belgium), Isar148 (Germany), Theater im Bahnhof (Austria), Impromptu Theatre (the Netherlands), and: Lee White (Canada), Tom Johnson (USA), Bronwynn Mertz-Penzinger (Australia/Austria), Leon Düvel (Germany)

=== 2004 ===
Invited theatres and special guests: Teater Narobov (Slovenia), Theater im Bahnhof (Austria), The Brody Theater (USA), Die Gorillas (Germany), Stockholms Improvisationsteater (Sweden), and: Yann Van den Branden (Belgium), Bronwyn Mertz (Australia/Austria), and young Slovenian actor Nejc Simšič

=== 2003 ===
Invited theatres: Improklub (Slovenia), Isar148 (Germany), Unexpected Productions (USA), Improvvisatione Teatrale Italiana (Italy), Theater im Bahnhof (Austria)

=== 2002 ===
The festival was started by the Improvisation Society of Slovenia under the title Naked Stage International Improvisational Theatre Festival.

Invited theatres and special guests: Improklub (Slovenia), Gledališče Ane Monro (Slovenia), and: Jakob Schweighofer (Austria), Roland Trescher (Germany), Daniel Goldstein (USA), Henk Van der Steen (Netherlands), Albin Juhanović (B&H)
