= Folke Rabe =

Swedish composer (1935–2017)

Folke Rabe (28 October 1935 – 25 September 2017) was a Swedish composer. He was born in Stockholm and studied at the Royal College of Music, Stockholm, where his teachers included Karl-Birger Blomdahl, Ingvar Lidholm, György Ligeti and others. He died in Stockholm, aged 81.

His works include the electronic drone pieces What?? (also translated as "Was??") (1968), Basta for solo trombone (1982), Escalations for brass quintet (1988), Concerto for trombone: "All the Lonely People" (1989) featuring quotes from The Beatles' "Eleanor Rigby", and With Love No. 1 and 2 for piano (1988). A more extensive list is given below.

== Works ==
=== Orchestral music ===
- Hep-Hep for symphony orchestra (1966)
- All the Lonely People..., concert for trombone and chamber orchestra (1989)
- Naturen, flocken och släkten (”Nature, Herd and Relatives”), concert for French horn and string orchestra (1991)
- Sardine Sarcophagus, concert for trumpet and sinfonietta (1995)
- Så att denna sång inte dör (”So That this Song Will Not Die”) for symphony orchestra (1998)
- L'Assiuolo caprese, concert for brass quintet and orchestra (2002)

=== Works for band ===
- Henry IV (1964)
- Altiplano (1982)

=== Works for radio ===
- ISNOT, music dramatic work for radio, text by Björner Torsson (2004–05)

=== Choral works ===
- 7 poems by Nils Ferlin for mixed chorus (1958)
- Pièce for speaking chorus, with Lasse O'Månsson (1961)
- Rondes for mixed chorus (also a version for male chorus) (1964)
- OD for male chorus (1965)
- Joe's Harp for mixed chorus (1970)
- Två strofer (Two Stanzas””) for mixed chorus, text by Göran Sonnevi (1980)
- to love for mixed chorus, text by E.E. Cummings (1984)
- Hövisk pålslagarmadrigal for OD, 150 (”Courteous Piledrivers' Madrigal for O.D., 150”) for male chorus (2003)

=== Vocal music ===
- Havets hand 1 and 2 for voice and piano, text by Elmer Diktonius (1958)
- Notturno for mezzo-soprano, flute, oboe and clarinet, text by Edith Södergran (1959)
- Två sånger till Rune Lindström på Svenska Flaggans Dag (”Two Songs for Rune Lindström on the Day of the Swedish Flag”) for voice and piano, text by the composer (1964–65)
- SJU 7 – Lättjan ("SEVEN 7 – The Laziness") for tenor solo, mixed chorus, 3 percussionists and string quartet, text by Carl Jonas Love Almqvist (2005)

=== Chamber music ===
- Suite for two clarinets (1957)
- Divertimento for Solo Clarinet (1958)
- Bolos for 4 trombones, with Jan Bark (1962)
- Impromptu for clarinet/bass clarinet, trombone, cello, piano and percussion (1962)
- Souvenirs for speaker, hammond organ and rhythm group (1963)
- Pajazzo for 8 jazz musicians (1964)
- Polonaise for 4 trombones, lighting & movement, with Jan Bark (1966)
- Basta for solo trombone (1982)
- Shazam for trumpet solo (1984)
- Escalations for brass quintet (1988)
- Tintomara for trumpet and trombone (1992)
- Jawbone Five for trombone and 6 percussionists (1996)
- A Chaser for flute, violin, cello and piano (2004)

=== Music for organ ===
- Sebastian (2001)

=== Music for piano ===
- 7 Variations for Piano (1957–60)
- With Love (1984)

=== Film music ===
- Mannen som övergav bilar (”The Man Who Abandoned Cars”), with Ken Dewey (1963–66)
- På månen blåser ingen hambo (”No Hambones on the Moon”), with The Culture Quartet (1971)
- Pank (”Broke”) for trombones and keyboards, with Olle Eriksson (1980)

=== Electronic music ===
- ARGH!, electroacoustic music (1965)
- Va?? Was?? What??, electroacoustic music (1967)
- To the Barbender, electroacoustic music (1982)
- Narrskeppet (”Ship of Fools”), intermedia performance (1983)
- Cyclone, electroacoustic music (1985)
- Älskade lilla gris (”Beloved Little Pig”) for narrator, electroacoustic music and slide projections, text by Ulf Nilsson (1986)
- Världsmuséet (”World Museum”), intermedia performance, with The New Culture Quartet (1987)
- Narragonien (”Narragonia”), indermedia performance, with The New Culture Quartet (1990)
- Swinee River, electroacoustic music (2005)

== Selected discography ==
- What?? (1997, Dexter's Cigar 12). Reissued with an added half-speed version, formerly on Wergo.

== Sources ==
- Erickson, Robert (1975). Sound Structure in Music. University of California Press. ISBN 0-520-02376-5.
