= Narobov =

Slovenian performing arts collective

Kolektiv Narobov is a performing arts collective from Ljubljana, Slovenia. In their very beginnings, the members of the collective have been trained in the North American style of theatre improvisation, influenced by some of its most notable practitioners, such as Keith Johnstone, Del Close, Ruth Zaporah, Randy Dixon, and others. However, ever since they have been developing their unique approach to improvisation, combining theatre improvisation techniques with the influences of physical theatre, contemporary dance and clowning. Kolektiv Narobov has made significant steps in applying the principles of spontaneous composition and live interaction with the audience, as done in theatre improvisation, into various other styles and media. These range from experimental theatre, clown and cabaret pieces to site-specific performances and radio plays, all the way to film.

Since the founding of the collective in 2004, Kolektiv Narobov has reached international acclaim, touring, guest-performing and teaching all across Europe, Canada and the United States.

In 2013, Kolektiv Narobov has joined Zavod Federacija Ljubljana, a big network of Slovenian artists who offer each other organisational, artistic and production support.

== Projects ==
=== Theatre, Film, Book ===
Should I Stay or Should I Go?, 2013-2015

=== Performances ===
- Meta impro, 2011
- FM, 2011
- Le Grand Big Tour (with cheese), 2010
- Zaprto-odprto / Closed-open, 2010
- Šov dveh vdov / The Two Widows Show, 2009
- Tok-tok!, 2008
- De.Kons, 2007
- Klic / Call, 2006
- Kjer ga najdeš / Where you find it, 2006
- Lutkovni kabare / Puppet Cabaret, 2005
- Pozor, delo na odru! / Caution! Stage under Construction, 2005
- Fantastični kabare / Fantastic Cabaret, 2005
- Pssst! / Hush!, 2004
- Ta Kratke / Shorties, 2004
- France P. / France P., 2004
- Improvizija / Improvision, 2002-2011, each year an evening before the Eurovision Song Contest

=== Interventions ===
- Velika Sestra / Big Sister, 2007
- Nokturno / Nocturne, 2004
- Zvoki mesta / Sounds of the City, 2004

=== Festival ===
- Goli oder / Naked Stage (since 2002)

== Awards ==
Kolektiv Narobov have received awards for creative achievements in radio and television (Ježek Award in 2007) and for best experimental theatre improvisation performance (First Prize at Impronale 2007 and Impronale 2010).
