= Dennis Walder =

Dennis Walder (born 7 February 1943) is a South African-born British literary scholar, critic and writer. He is Emeritus Professor of Literature at The Open University. His research spans Victorian literature, postcolonial literature, and cultural memory, and he is known for his influential work on Charles Dickens, Athol Fugard, and postcolonial theory.

== Early life and education ==
Walder was born in Cape Town to Jean Walder and Ruth Liebenstein. He was educated at Pretoria Boys High School and went on to earn a combined BA BComm from the University of Cape Town in 1964, followed at the University of Edinburgh by an MA (Hons) in 1967, an MLitt in 1969, and in 1979 by a PhD with a dissertation on Dickens and Religion, published as a book in 1979 and reissued by Routledge in 2007.

== Academic career ==
During the early 1970s Walder served as Research fellow in English at the University of Edinburgh while teaching university undergraduates as well as adults for the Workers' Educational Association. He subsequently joined the Open University of Scotland as Staff Tutor in Arts, later becoming Lecturer and chair of the institution's influential Nineteenth-Century Novel course. He served as Head of Department 1996–2000.

Walder was an early proponent of the move to widen the literature curriculum. He introduced Athol Fugard and postcolonial literatures to the Open University curriculum and founded a Postcolonial Literatures Research Group, serving as director of the Ferguson Centre for African and Asian Studies. His reflections on this curricular transformation appeared in "Decolonising the Distance Curriculum" in Teaching Literature at a Distance (2010).

He was appointed chair and Professor of Literature in 1999, becoming emeritus Professor of Literature at the Open University in 2010.

== Scholarship, research and publications ==
Walder's research spans Victorian fiction, modernism, and postcolonial studies. His early work, Dickens and Religion (1981; reissued 2007), explores Dickens's religious imagination. He subsequently edited editions for Penguin Classics (Sketches by Boz, 1995) and Oxford World's Classics (Dombey and Son, 2001; Little Dorrit, 2012).

Walder was the first scholar to publish a monograph on South African playwright Athol Fugard, editing three volumes of his plays for Oxford University Press and authoring a study in the Writers and Their Work series. His article "Resituating Fugard: South African Drama as Witness" (New Theatre Quarterly, 1992) challenged established readings of Fugard's work, leading to roles as academic advisor for numerous theatre productions, including those at the Donmar Theatre and the National Theatre.

His major works include Post-Colonial Literatures: History, Language, Theory (1998), which introduced key debates in postcolonial writing, and Postcolonial Nostalgias: Writing, Memory and Representation (2012), examining how memory and nostalgia shape postcolonial identities. Walder also edited the influential anthology Literature in the Modern World: Critical Essays and Documents (1990; 2nd ed. 2003), which has sold over 60,000 copies and is widely used in university courses.

His later research linking memory, identity, and representation culminated in the memoir Amid the Alien Corn: A Son's Memoir (2025).

== Literary production ==
Alongside his academic scholarship, Walder has written poetry and fiction. His poem "Someone Said" won third prize in the Fish Competition and was published in the Fish Anthology (2018).

== Awards and recognition ==
- Emeritus Professor of Literature, The Open University (2010)
- Third Prize, Fish Publishing International Poetry Competition (2018) for "Someone Said"
- Wertheim Lecture in Comparative Drama, Indiana University Bloomington (2013): "The Play's the Thing: A Journey through the Drama of South Africa"

== Selected publications ==
- Dickens and Religion (1981; reissued 2007, Routledge)
- Post-Colonial Literatures: History, Language, Theory (1998, Blackwell)
- Literature in the Modern World: Critical Essays and Documents (ed., 1990; 2nd ed. 2003, Oxford University Press)
- Postcolonial Nostalgias: Writing, Memory and Representation (2012, Routledge)
- Amid the Alien Corn: A Son's Memoir (2025, Shearsman Books)
- Edited volumes of The Plays of Athol Fugard (Oxford University Press)
