= Yes And =

Yes And may refer to:

- "Yes And" (BoJack Horseman), 2015 television episode
- Yes, and..., improvisational comedy technique
- "Yes, And?", 2024 song by Ariana Grande
- Yes, And..., 2023 album by '68
