= John J. Sweeney (professional speaker) =

American keynote speaker and author

John Sweeney (born October 29, 1965) is an American keynote speaker, author, owner of the Brave New Outpost, and former owner of the Brave New Workshop Comedy Theatre in Minneapolis, Minnesota.

== Career life ==
In 1997, Sweeney and his wife, Jenni Lilledahl, along with Mark Bergren (who left in 1999) purchased the Brave New Workshop Comedy Theatre from founder Dudley Riggs. The Brave New Workshop is the longest running satirical comedy theater in the United States. In 2021, John transitioned the live theatre division to Hennepin Theatre Trust and formed the new company Brave New Outpost, which is wholly focused on expanding improv-based theatre skills and behaviors to business in the form of professional keynote speaking, experiential training, breakouts, messaging, cultural transformation programs. Sweeney has delivered thousands of keynote speeches to some of the best companies in the world including Microsoft, Target, Hilton, United Health Group, General Mills, Facebook, Apple, and Bank First. He has shared the stage with George Bush, Sr., Deepak Chopra, Betty White, Steve Ballmer, and Mark Zuckerberg.

Sweeney has written four books. A quote from Sweeney, taken from the book Innovation at the Speed of Laughter: 8 Secrets to World Class Idea Generation, appeared as cup quote #183 in Starbucks "The Way I See It Program.". The quote read: "Improvisers don't look at change as an obstacle; we look at it as fuel. we know that the next great idea lies just on the other side of the change. We are constantly asking ourselves, 'What can I do to incite change?' Well?"

John Sweeney is well known for his MN Timberwolves superfan character, deemed "Jiggly Boy," which was a stunt that went viral and garnered over 500 million views as well as pickup in all major US sports media. His website Jigglyboy.com has funded hundreds of surgeries for children through Smile Network, International.

== Personal ==
Sweeney was born in Madison, Wisconsin and spent his early years working on his family's dairy farm. He graduated Edgewood High School in 1984 and then St. Norbert College in De Pere, Wisconsin in 1988. In 2005, Sweeney received the Distinguished Alumni Award in Business from the college.

Sweeney and his wife, Jenni Lilledahl, and family live in Deephaven, Minnesota.

== Books ==
Sweeney, John (2004). Innovation at the Speed of Laughter: 8 Secrets to World-Class Idea Generation. Aerialist Press. ISBN 0-9762184-0-2.
Sweeney, John (2005). The Art of the Laugh: A Handbook for Sketch Writers, Actors, and Directors. Aerialist Press. ISBN 0-9762184-1-0.
Sweeney, John (2007). Return to Civility: A Speed of Laughter Project. Aerialist Press. ISBN 0-9762184-2-9.
Sweeney, John (2007). Innovation at the Speed of Laughter: 8 Secrets to World-Class Idea Generation. (paperback) Aerialist Press. ISBN 0-9762184-3-7.

== Articles ==
Promiscuous Hostility, Positive Neutrality, Interview with John Sweeney, IdeaConnection, November 8, 2009. By Vern Burkhardt
