= Patricia Ryan Madson =

American educator

Patricia Ryan Madson (born 1942) is an American educator, author, and theater practitioner. She is Professor Emerita of Drama at Stanford University, where she led the undergraduate acting program and founded the Stanford Improvisors. She is the author of Improv Wisdom: Don't Prepare, Just Show Up (Bell Tower/Random House, 2005), which has been translated into ten languages and editions including Korean, Japanese, German, Russian, Spanish, Italian, Chinese (in three separate editions), and most recently Tibetan, and has received more than 2,500 reader ratings on Goodreads.

== Early life and education ==
Madson attended Westhampton College of the University of Richmond, where she earned a BA in Philosophy and Greek Studies. She subsequently received an MA in Theater from Wayne State University.

== Academic career ==
Madson began her university teaching career as an assistant professor of drama at Denison University in Granville, Ohio, in 1969. Stanford University recruited her in 1977 to lead its undergraduate Acting program.

Her tenure at Stanford lasted from 1977 to 2005. During that time she developed an academic curriculum in improvisational theater, one of the first of its kind at a major research university. In 1991 she founded the Stanford Improvisors (known informally as "the Simps"), a student performance and learning community that continues to operate today. She also served as founding director of Stanford Improv Summer Stock in 1993 and 1994, bringing internationally known improv practitioner Keith Johnstone as a guest instructor.

In 1998, Madson received Stanford University's Lloyd W. Dinkelspiel Award for Outstanding Innovation in Undergraduate Education, the university's highest teaching honor for contributions to undergraduate learning.

Madson also co-founded The Creativity Initiative, a coalition of Stanford faculty who worked from the premise that creativity can be taught as an academic discipline.

After retiring from full-time undergraduate teaching in 2005, she continued to teach beginning and advanced improvisation courses through Stanford's Continuing Studies Program and at the Esalen Institute in Big Sur, California.

== Improv Wisdom (2005) ==
Improv Wisdom: Don't Prepare, Just Show Up was published by Bell Tower, an imprint of Random House, in 2005. The book distills Madson's three decades of teaching experience into thirteen maxims — including "Say Yes," "Start Anywhere," "Pay Attention," and "Make Mistakes, Please" — and argues that the principles of improvisational theater offer a practical framework for everyday life, business, and personal growth.

Publishers Weekly described Madson as a "drama teacher turned self-help advisor" and noted the book's accessible, exercise-driven approach. The New York Times referenced Madson's work in a 2008 piece examining whether executives can learn to abandon scripted behavior. Bestselling author Daniel Pink cited her work in connection with To Sell Is Human (2012). Social psychologist Philip G. Zimbardo contributed an endorsement, and Zen teacher Norman Fischer described the book as "lucid, wise, and free-spirited." Madson has spoken about the book at Talks at Google and served as a keynote speaker at international conferences.

The book has been translated into Korean, Japanese, German (Unverhofft kommt oft!), Russian, Spanish, Italian, and Chinese (in three separate editions), and most recently into Tibetan.

== Constructive Living ==
Alongside her work in improvisation, Madson has long been involved with Constructive Living, a practice developed by psychologist David K. Reynolds that draws on the Japanese therapeutic traditions of Morita therapy and Naikan. She and her husband Ronald Madson co-direct the California Center for Constructive Living in El Granada, California. She contributed chapters to two edited academic volumes on Constructive Living published by the State University of New York Press (1989 and 1993).

== Personal life ==
Madson lives in El Granada, California, with her husband Ronald Madson.

== Selected bibliography ==
- Improv Wisdom: Don't Prepare, Just Show Up. Bell Tower/Random House, 2005. ISBN 9781400081882
- "Constructive Living for the Well — Towards a Superior Life." In Plunging Through the Clouds: Constructive Living Currents, edited by David K. Reynolds. SUNY Press, 1993. pp. 29–35.
- "Naikan at Senkobo." In Flowing Bridges, Quiet Waters, edited by David K. Reynolds. SUNY Press, 1989. pp. 132–139.
