= Brave New Workshop =

Improv comedy theater in Minneapolis, Minnesota

- BNW
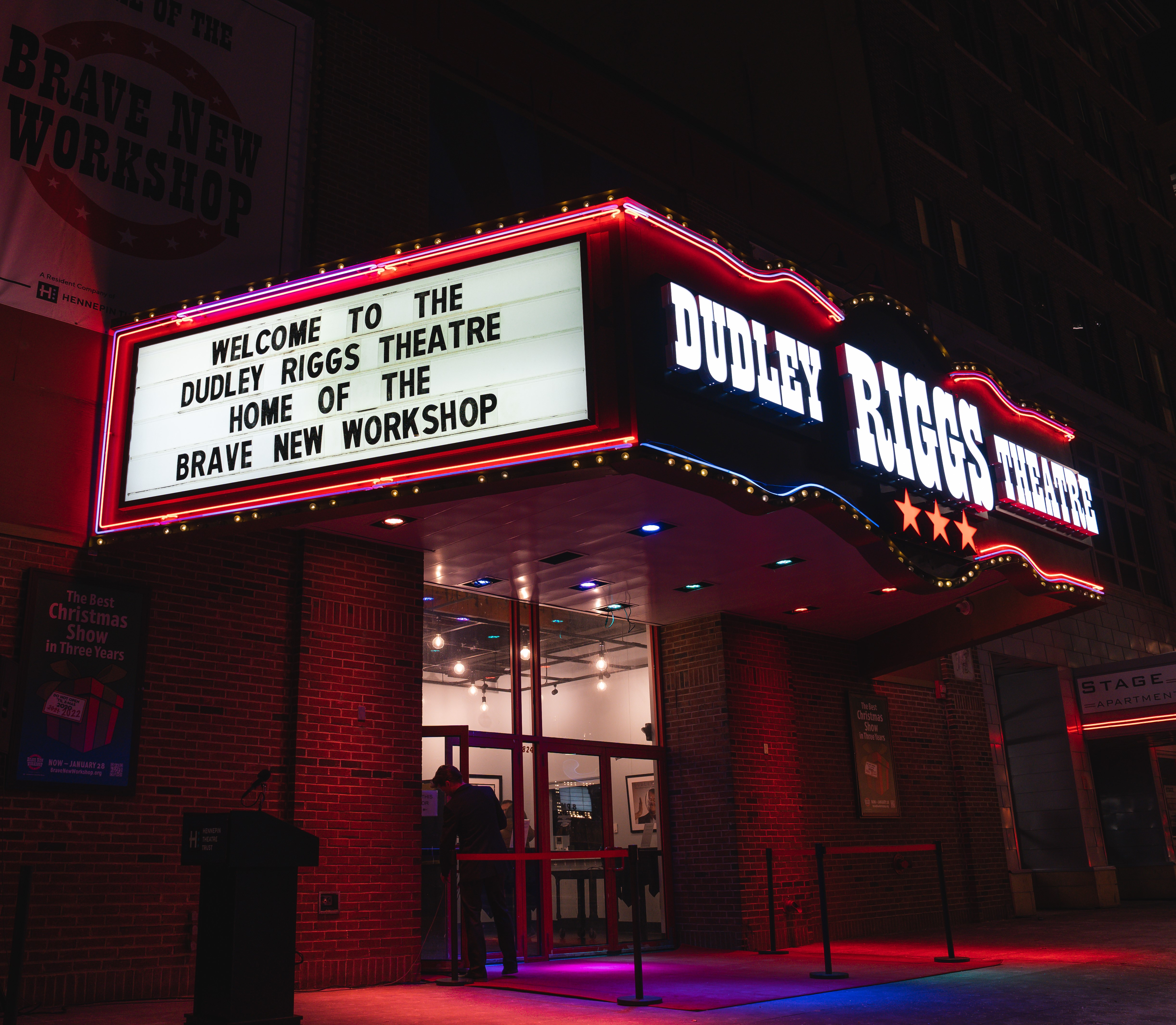
- Dudley Riggs Theatre marquee (Photo by Wells Film & Photo 2022)
- Interactive map of Brave New Workshop
- Address: 824 Hennepin Avenue
- Location: Minneapolis, Minnesota
- Event: Comedy club

Construction
- Opened: 1958 (current location opened in 2010)

Website
- Brave New Workshop

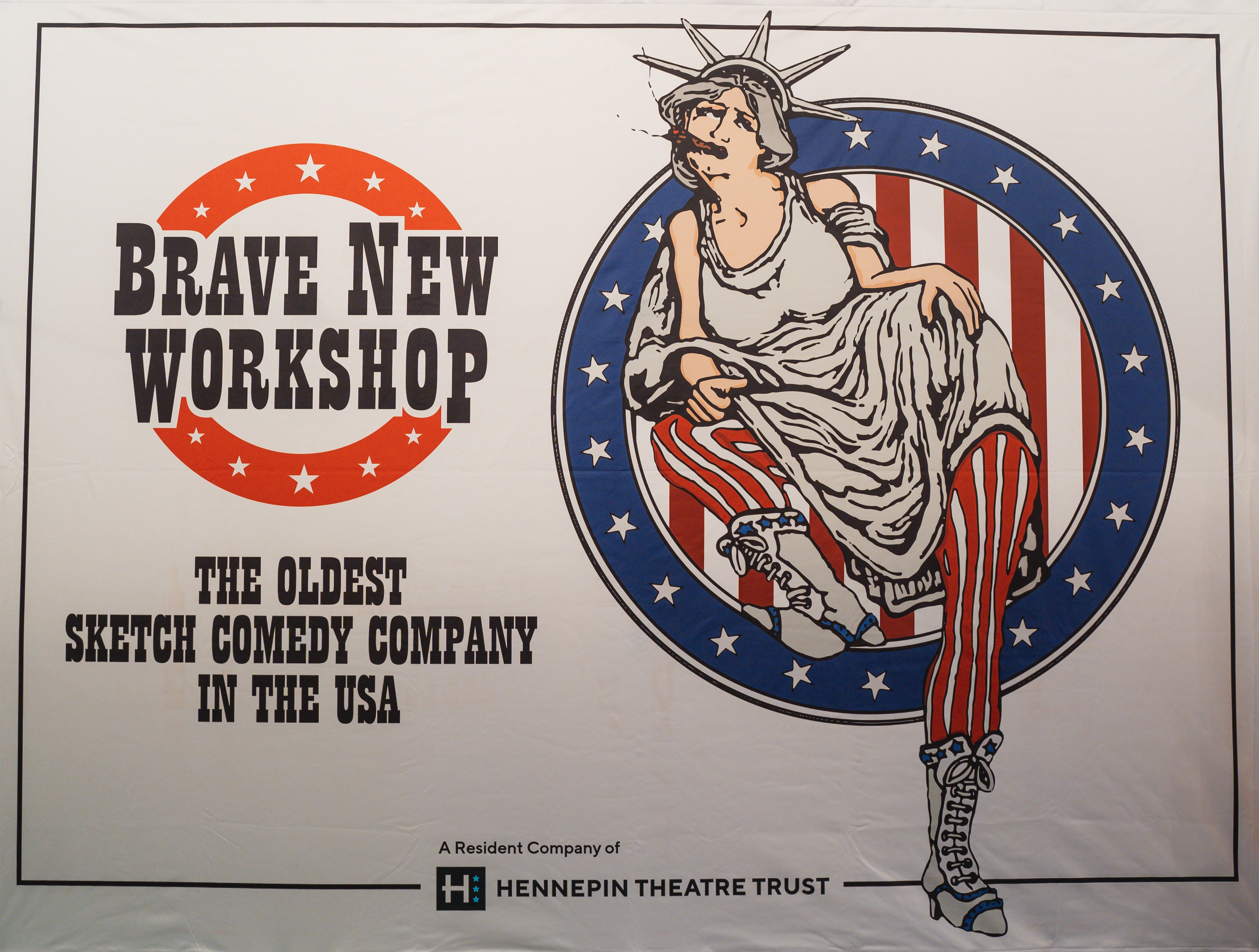
Lady Liberty - Lobby Photo by Wells Film & Photo 2022

The Brave New Workshop (BNW), based in Minneapolis, Minnesota, was founded by Dudley Riggs in 1958 and is the longest running sketch and improvisational comedy theater in the US. BNW continues the tradition of writing, producing, and performing as a Resident Theatre of Hennepin Theatre Trust.

== History ==
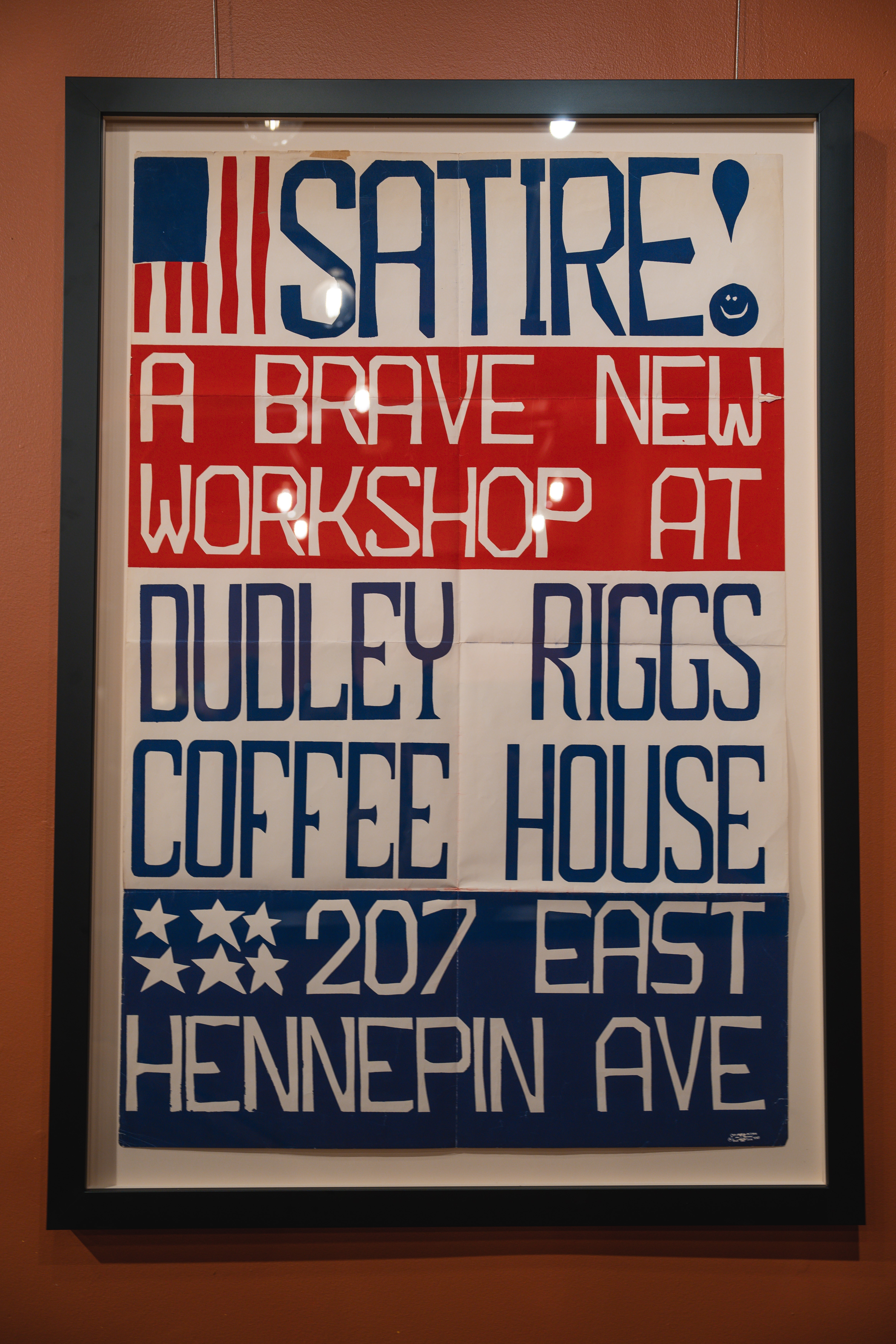
Original Sign from 207 East Hennepin Ave Location Photo by Wells Film & Photo 2022

Brave New Workshop was founded in 1958 by Dudley Riggs, a fifth-generation circus aerialist who performed all over the globe. Riggs's parents were circus and vaudeville performers, and he regularly joked that he ran away from the circus to find a home. BNW was originally known as the “Instant Theatre Company.” Riggs assembled and led a talented group of writers and performers intending to make people think by first making them laugh. In the late ’50s, the troupe travelled to Minneapolis and performed at a restaurant called Steffano’s.

The Instant Theater Company then decided to stay in Minneapolis and create a performing space for themselves; "Dudley Riggs' Cafe Espresso" opened in a former garage at 18 University Avenue SE. In 1961 the venue relocated to 207 E. Hennepin Avenue, and after much planning and brainstorming, and with help from friends Dick Guindon, Irv Letofsky, and Dan Sullivan, this would be the beginning of the satirical comedy theatre that was known for many years as Dudley Riggs' Brave New Workshop. Four years later, in 1965, the theatre moved to 2605 Hennepin Avenue, a space that had been a bicycle shop, and would be home to the theatre for most of the following four decades.

The Brave New Workshop took its name from Aldous Huxley's Brave New World and bills itself as the oldest ongoing satirical comedy theater in the nation. Nearly 400 original productions have been mounted on Brave New Workshop stages for more than three million people. Improv and sketch comedy shows can be seen on its stage nearly every weekend.

In March 1997, Riggs sold the theater to John Sweeney, Jenni Lilledahl, and Mark Bergren. Bergren left the Brave New Workshop in 1999 to pursue other interests. The name of the theater changed slightly to "The Brave New Workshop, founded by Dudley Riggs in 1958." Despite the name change, BNW continued to produce all-original sketch comedy and improvisation revues on a year-round basis. In 1998, co-owner Jenni Lilledahl told the Austin American-Statesman that after the 1997 purchase from Riggs, the new owners wanted to regain the national exposure associated with the theater's earlier years and viewed Austin's Big Stinkin' International Improv & Sketch Comedy Festival as a way to do so.

They also oversaw the Brave New Institute, a training center for improvisation. The school claimed to have the most broad-based improv curriculum of any training center in the country, with more than 300 students and specific programming for performers, non-performers, youth, seniors, and corporations.

In December 2021, Hennepin Theatre Trust purchased the assets of BNW as well as the Dudley Riggs Theatre, located at 824 Hennepin Avenue with the vision of carrying on BNW's long-standing legacy of world-class sketch comedy and improvisation.

== Location ==
Early locations for Riggs' venue were across the Mississippi River from downtown Minneapolis, at 18 University Avenue SE and 207 East Hennepin Avenue. In 1965, Riggs moved the company to its historic location at 2605 Hennepin Avenue South, where it remained until 1998, when the BNW moved four blocks south to Calhoun Square in Uptown Minneapolis. Finding the location a financial burden, the company returned to 2605 Hennepin in 2002. The Brave New Workshop also operated a satellite location in neighboring Saint Paul, Minnesota for five years before closing in 2006. In 1971, a satellite theater and cafe, the "ETC" ("Experimental Theatre Company," not to be confused with The Brave New Workshop's current "Experimental Thinking Centre"), opened in the Southern Theatre at Seven Corners in the Cedar Riverside area of Minneapolis' West Bank. In 2010, previous owners John Sweeney and Jenni Lilledahl purchased the Hennepin Stages Theater at 824 Hennepin Avenue (the longtime home to productions such as Tony n' Tina's Wedding) in downtown Minneapolis. The historic location at 2605 Hennepin Avenue was sold in August 2014.

In December 2021 the 824 Hennepin Avenue building was purchased by the Hennepin Theatre Trust. The building was renamed Dudley Riggs Theatre in November 2022 and currently houses the theater where the main stage sketch comedy shows are performed, as well as an event space.

== Shows ==
BNW, was closed by executive order in March 2020 due to the COVID-19 pandemic. The troupe returned to the stage as a Hennepin Theatre Trust Resident Theatre in May 2022. Recent shows include Back to Workshop or Everything's Fine! (Summer 2022), This Show is Cheaper Than Gas - America on Empty (Fall 2022), and The Best Christmas Show in Three Years (2022).

== Notable alumni ==
Notable alumni of the Brave New Workshop include Louie Anderson, Mo Collins, Tom Davis, Al Franken, Penn Jillette, Carl Lumbly, Paul Menzel, Pat Proft, Annie Reirson, Taylor Nikolai, Nancy Steen, Peter Tolan, Linda Wallem, Lizz Winstead, Peter MacNicol, Melissa Peterman, and Cedric Yarbrough.

== Current leadership ==
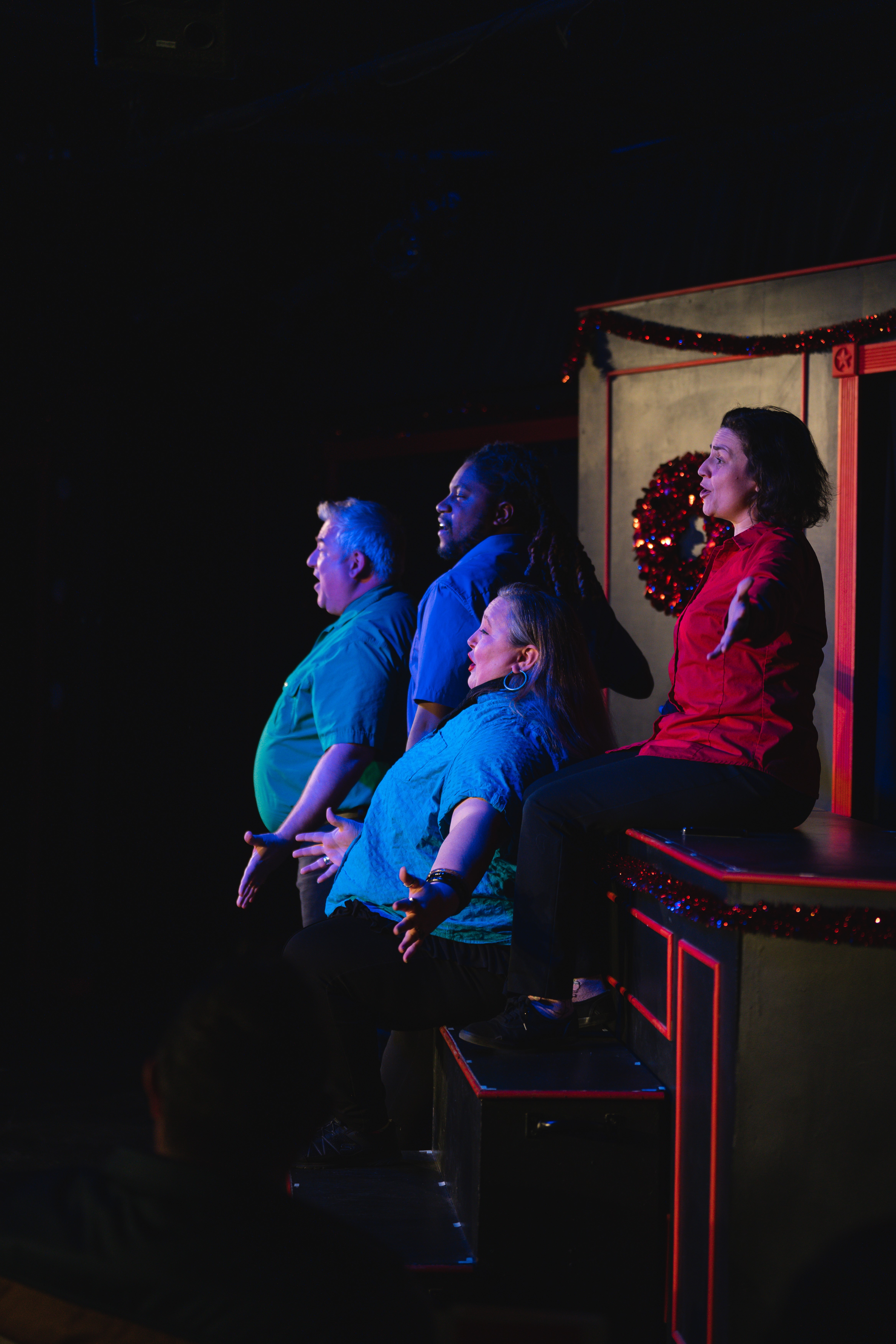
BNW Actors-Holiday 2022 Photo by Wells Film & Photo

The Brave New Workshop is a Resident Theatre of the Hennepin Theatre Trust. Caleb McEwen, who has been with BNW for 26 years and part of more than 100 productions, currently serves as the artistic director. Matthew Vichlach, veteran Technical Director continues to provide Light, Sound and Video Design. Long time performers Lauren Anderson, Taj Ruler, Denzel Belin and Jon Pumper (music director) have all returned to the writer's room and the stage. They are joined again by a more recent addition, Doug Neithercott (long time Twin Cities performer) to continue the tradition of Promiscuous Hostility and Positive Neutrality started by Riggs more than 60 years ago.

== Partnerships ==
The Brave New Workshop was the featured entertainment for Disney Cruise Line for several years, and the resident comedy-writing team for NPR's "All Things Considered." Brave New Workshop actors have worked with Minnesota Public Radio's comedy show Wits, hosted by John Moe.

== Bibliography ==
- Hubbard, Rob. Brave New Workshop : Promiscuous Hostility and Laughs in the Land of Loons. History Press, South Carolina, 2015. ISBN 9781626196865
- Riggs, Dudley. Flying Funny: My Life Without a Net. University of Minnesota Press, Minneapolis, 2017. ISBN 9781517901677
