= Paul Menzel =

American actor

Paul Menzel is an American actor, writer, producer, and business consultant in Houston, Texas.

He began his career by organizing a comedy troupe while a student at Carleton College in Northfield, Minnesota. After graduation, he was performer and writer at Dudley Riggs' Brave New Workshop in Minneapolis.

Later, Menzel founded the Comedy Workshops in Houston and Austin, Texas. He founded, with Layton Payne, Business Stages, a consultancy which uses acting and improvisational exercises to teach management and cooperative skills.

== Filmography ==
Year	Title	Role	Notes
1978	FM	Guard Frank	
1980	Hotwire		
1981	Reborn	T.V. Director	
1981	Terms of Endearment	Dr. Maise	
1984	Uphill All the Way	David Harris	TV movie
1985	The Lady from Yesterday	Howard Ames	TV movie
1986	Uphill All the Way	Merchant Gambler	
1986	Adam: His Song Continues	Ray Mellette	TV movie
1987	A Tiger's Tale	Husband	
1989	The Fulfillment	Eddie Duzak	TV movie
1991	A Seduction in Travis County	Ken Stone	TV movie
1991	Without Warning: The James Brady Story	Reporter	TV movie
1992	Trial: The Price of Passion, Part 1	Medical Examiner	TV movie
1993	My Boyfriend's Back	Townsperson	
