= Applied improvisation =

Application of improvisational methods in various fields

Applied improvisation is the application of improvisational theatrical methods in various non-theatrical fields, including consulting, training, and teaching. It is known to be used as an experiential educational approach which enables participants to explore and improve their leadership, management and interpersonal capabilities in several fields, which include collaboration, communications, creativity, and team-building.

== History ==
Applied improvisation began in the late 1990s with the performative turn in social science. The increased focus on performance and improvisation led to the application of improvisational methods in non-theatrical fields. In 2002, the Applied Improvisation Network was founded, a non-profit organization of people committed to using applied improvisation.

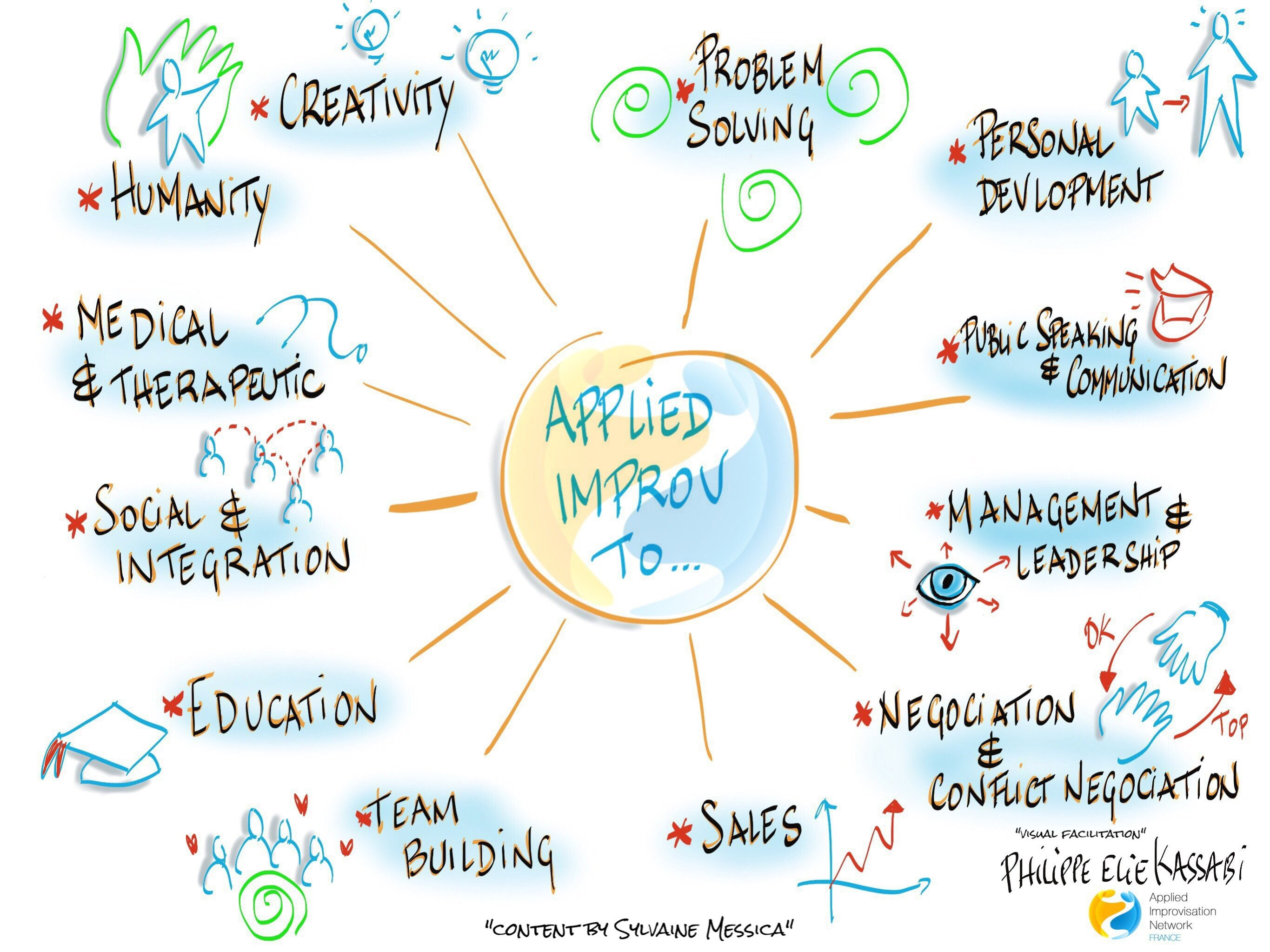
Uses of applied improvisation

Applied improvisation sees use in consulting and corporate training, particularly in the areas of sales and leadership. Applied improvisation is also often used in design thinking, service design, and UX design.

In addition to the business world, applied improvisation sees use in disaster readiness training, drama therapy, medicine, and education.
