= Playback Theatre =

Form of improvisational theatre

Playback Theatre is an original form of improvisational theatre in which audience or group members tell stories from their lives and watch them enacted on the spot. Then if a group member wishes a happier ending to a story, that new version is re-enacted for catharsis.

== History ==
Playback Theatre was founded in upstate New York in 1975 by Jonathan Fox and Jo Salas, with members of the original Playback Theatre company. In 1979/80 Fox taught a course in Playback Theatre at SUNY New Paltz. Since that time the form has spread throughout North America, Europe, Asia, Africa, and the Middle East. Playback companies now exist on six continents. The International Playback Theatre Network (IPTN) was founded in 1990 to support Playback activity throughout the world through international conferences and the IPTN Journal (formerly Interplay). As of 2018, the IPTN has 192 group members and 320 practitioner and individual members from 40 countries.

== Training ==
To meet the demand for training which this level of growth has created, in 1993 Jonathan Fox founded the School of Playback Theatre to provide beginning, intermediate and advanced levels of training in Playback Theatre. The School of Playback Theatre subsequently became the Centre for Playback Theatre.

Other schools for training exist in Italy, Germany, Japan. and São Paulo, Brazil, Russia, United Kingdom, Israel, Hungary, Hong Kong, Australasia and Sweden. The Playback Centre keeps an online list of affiliated schools

Many publications on Playback Theatre are available including:

- Playback Theatre Resources: guidebooks available for a modest donation (as downloads) on Playback Theatre acting, conducting, business development skills, and deepening social impact. Also, video clips on several Playback forms.
- Tusitala Publishing: mostly written by the founders of Playback
- Essays and articles.

== Conferences and gatherings ==
There are regular and semi-regular Playback gatherings and conferences in different parts of the world, including in the U.S., Finland, the UK, Italy, Germany, Eastern Europe, Israel, Hong Kong, Nepal and India. The International Playback Theatre Network (IPTN) holds a conference every four years in different parts of the world. IPTN conferences have taken place in Sydney, Australia (1992), in a village north of Helsinki, Finland (1993), in Olympia, Washington, USA (1995), Perth, Australia (1997), York, England (1999), Shizuoka, Japan (2003), São Paulo, Brazil (2007), Frankfurt, Germany (2011), Montreal, Canada (2015), and Bangalore, India (2019)., and Muldersdrift, South Africa (2023). The next international conference will take place in Mexico in 2027.

== Education ==
Playback practitioners have used the method in schools on issues such as bullying (students tell stories about their experiences in relation to bullying, watch them played back, and then explore ways to create a respectful and safe school environment). Playback is used both by classroom teachers and by visiting performers/leaders.

== Business ==
Since the mid-1990s Playback Theatre and allied techniques have increasingly been used as an effective tool in workplace training of subjects such as management and communication skills and diversity awareness. In some cases, participants describe events which have taken place in the workplace, often events which gave rise to conflict or difficult feelings. Playback actors "replay" the events described and the facilitator orchestrates discussion about the replay, from which many participants describe valuable learning outcomes. A workplace performance can also invite any kind of stories, from out of the work environment.

== Therapy ==
Although Playback Theatre is not primarily a therapeutic technique, it is adaptable for use by therapists who are also trained in Playback Theatre. Clients can gain insight, catharsis, connection, and self-expression through telling their stories and participating in enacting stories of others.

== See also ==
- Drama therapy
- Improvisational theatre
- Psychodrama
- Forum theatre
- True Story with Hamish & Andy
