= Ken Dewey =

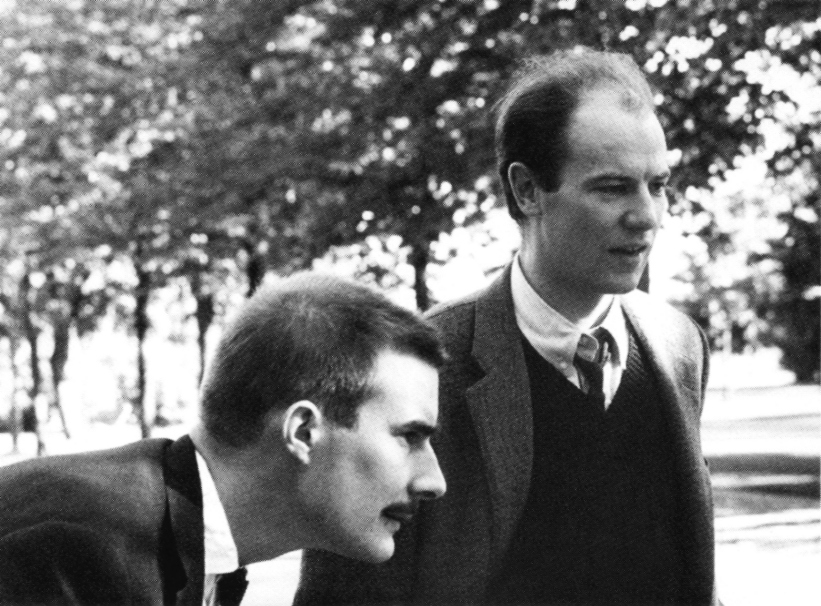
Ken Dewey (right) with the Finnish composer Henrik Otto Donner when they organized a happening in Helsinki, August 1963.

Kenneth Sawyer Goodman Dewey (1934-1972) was an American performance artist, playwright, and director who was active in the happening and action theatre movements in the U.S. and throughout Europe in the 1960s and early 1970s.

== Career ==
Dewey studied sculpture with Oronzio Maldarelli and writing with playwright Theodore Apstein while attending Columbia University as an undergraduate. He lived in San Francisco in the early 1960s and he became an assistant director at the Actor's Workshop in San Francisco. He also studied mime with R.G. “Ronnie” Davis at the San Francisco Mime Troupe and dance with Anna Halprin.

Dewey became interested in performance art when he was introduced to the work of Robert Whitman. Dewey used geography, social science, architecture, and technology in his work. His projects were often designed around a particular city and focused on that city's infrastructure, history, and culture. Notable works in this vein included City Scale (San Francisco) with Ramon Sender and Tony Martin, Street Piece (Helsinki), Exit Music (London), and Cincinnati Journey (Cincinnati).

Dewey lived and worked in European cities from 1963 to 1964, where he staged several happenings and action theater pieces, collaborating with Terry Riley, Chet Baker, Erkki Kurenniemi, Henrik Otto Donner, members of Anna Halprin's San Francisco Dancers' Workshop and the Living Theater, among others. He collaborated with Mark Boyle, Allan Kaprow, and others on a happening at the International Drama Festival during the 1963 Edinburgh International Festival.

In 1966 he produced Selma Last Year at the New York Film Festival at Lincoln Center, Philharmonic Hall Lobby, New York City. It was one of the first multichannel video installations, with photographs by Bruce Davidson, and music by Terry Riley.

In 1966 Dewey became a staff member at the New York State Council on the Arts. While at NYSCA he held the positions director of program development and director of research. In 1970, he was appointed by Governor Nelson Rockefeller to serve on the New York State Commission on Cultural Resources, a temporary state commission started by Rockefeller to study the current and long-range fiscal needs of cultural institutions. That same year he was also director of Planning Corporation of the Arts, a one-year research project, partially funded by the NYSCA, into the role of arts in a democracy

== Death ==
Dewey died on August 3rd 1972 in Orange, Connecticut, when the single‐engine plane he was flying in alone crashed in the woods. He was 38 years old. The Dewey family invited several artists who knew him to create a work for his funeral. Nam June Paik played the piano outside while Yoko Ono did a "silent dramatic movement expressing agony". John Lennon was also present.

== Posthumous retrospectives and documentaries ==
A retrospective of his work Action Theatre: The Happenings of Ken Dewey was curated by Barbara Moore at the Franklin Furnace Archive in 1987.

A biographical documentary titled Ken Dewey: This Is A Test and directed by Sally Williams was released in 2016.
