= Drama therapy =

Use of theatre techniques to promote mental health

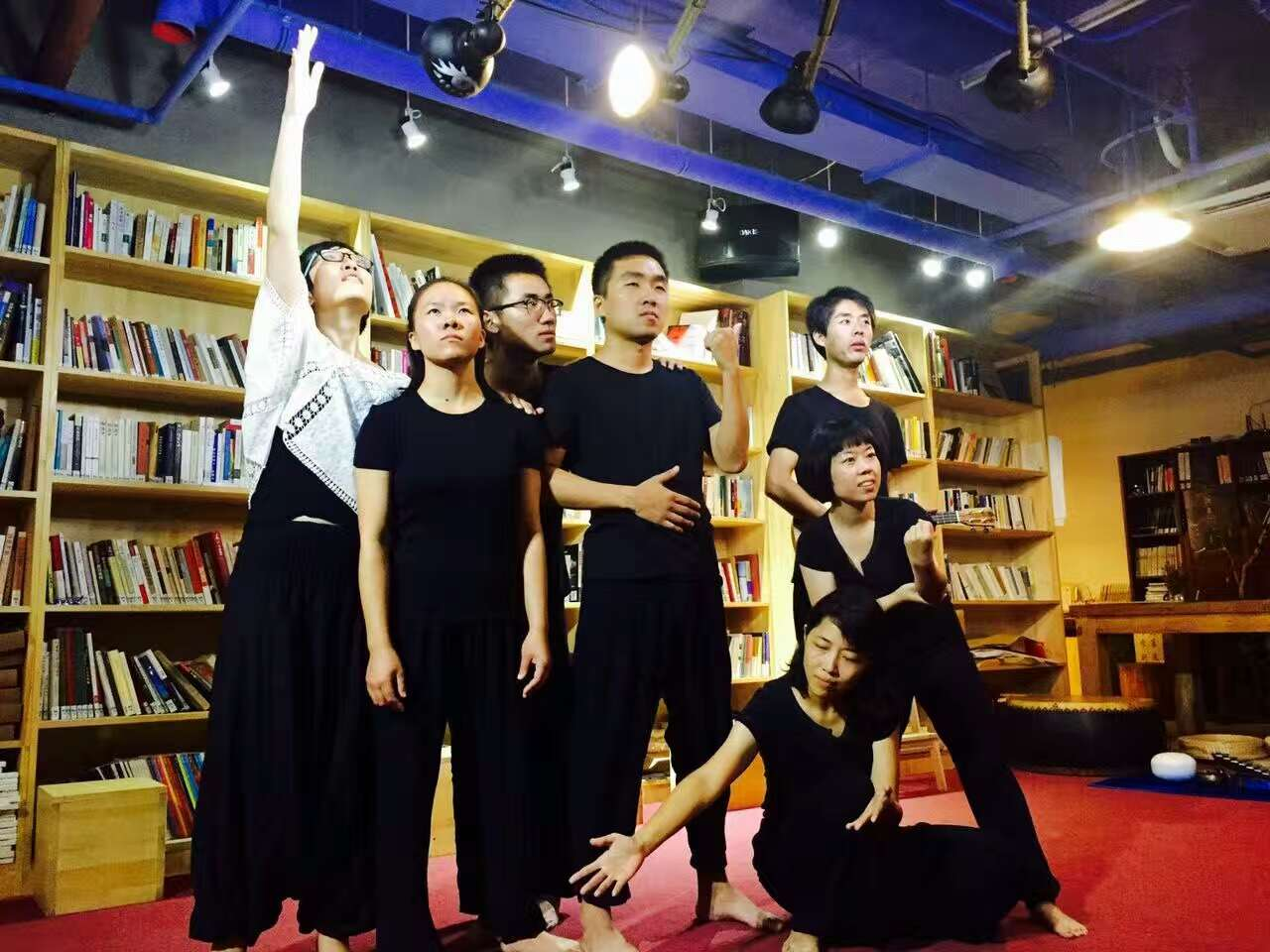

Drama therapy, also called acting therapy or actor therapy, is the use of acting techniques used for actors and non-actors to facilitate personal growth and promote mental health. Drama therapy is used in a wide variety of settings, including hospitals, schools, mental health centers, prisons, and businesses. Drama therapy, as a modality of the creative arts therapies, exists in many forms and can apply to individuals, couples, families, and various groups.

== History ==
The historical roots of drama therapy have been discussed by Jones (2007). At different times in history, drama has been used for psychological, political and religious change, such as Aristotle’s idea to use tragedy for ‘catharsis’. Several drama therapists have analyzed the historical roots of drama therapy in the context of ancient traditions and rituals (Jones, 2007). However, according to Jones (2007), the specific connection between drama and therapy did not emerge until the nineteenth century and developed further throughout the twentieth century. The development of drama therapy did not occur through one given pioneer, or even in one field, country or moment. Ideas about drama and healing were formed through several individual journeys and more or less accidental elements. David Johnstone and Renée Emunah stated that in the early stages of drama therapy, most drama therapists started as doers, actors or clinicians, "who discovered for themselves the exciting possibility of linking drama with healing"(Johnstone and Emunah, 2009, p. 16). Robert Landy noted that "(t)he field of drama therapy is an expansive one, developing in a number of countries simultaneously, most notably England, the United States and the Netherlands"(Landy, 1994, p. 32).

The Netherlands

In the Netherlands, the emergence of drama therapy has been closely tied to the jobs of activity leader, youth worker and social welfare worker (Jones, 2007). Learning about therapy and arts in these professions increased during the 1950s. Drama in the context of learning about the arts was strongly influenced by ‘play therapy’. Two main influencers in the early stages were Lex Wils and Jan Boomsluiter, who wrote about drama as therapy in the 1950s. Dutch drama therapist Gé Cimmermans argued that the arts therapies, including drama therapy, were initially mainly practiced by artists from Art Academies (Cimmermans, 2014, interviewed by Jorine Beck). Cimmermans (2014) also pointed to the influence of the School of Middeloo. This school was initially set up to train caregivers who had to work with children affected by the Second World War (van der Linde, 2010). Students were trained in using play and creative activities as the main methodology, and gained knowledge in psychology, pedagogy and other courses related to human development. In the 1960s the school started to offer different art therapy courses, based on the experience in teaching both creativity and human development.

England

According to Brenda Meldrum (1994), drama therapy in England evolved from drama in education, theatre in education and remedial drama from the 1960s onwards. Meldrum placed the start of drama therapy in the context of the 1960s, when the establishment, including psychiatry, was being questioned and an optimism about new ideas and approaches to learning and the arts was embraced. These radical approaches can similarly be found in Grotowski’s new way of training actors through laboratory theatre, in which the process was therapy for the actors and spectators and the work of Heathcote, who encouraged children to learn and reflect through drama. Meldrum noted that these radical ideas frightened the establishment, but despite that other practitioners were influenced by these ideas and centres for remedial drama and drama therapy started to be formed. In recent years, the wellbeing of actors in the creative industries has come into sharp focus in the UK. Beyond the therapeutic by-products of a life in the theatre, industrial protocols and educational policies are beginning to emerge that offer formalised support for student actors and actors in the profession.

Further development of the field

After the initial discoveries of the healing aspect of drama, the emerging field of drama therapy became more organized. Different schools of emerged in both the Netherlands and England. In the Netherlands the first two art therapy organisations were formed in the 1960s and from 1974 onwards official training courses were created (Jones, 2007).

Cimmermans (2014) asserted that three main schools of thought emerged in drama therapy in The Netherlands: the Creative Process Theory, the Analogue Process Model and the Cognitive Behavioural Model. According to Cimmermans, the Creative Process Theory was influenced by psychoanalytical and Rogerian theory. Henk Smeijsters (2006) wrote that the Creative Process Theory is based on the idea that through the creative arts process the client explores his or her needs, rediscovers suppressed needs, lets go of rigid patterns and experiments with new behaviour that fulfils the new discovered needs. The important element is the ‘aesthetic illusion’ that creates a safe distance in exploring the suppressed needs, which makes it less threatening for the client (Smeijsters, 2006). The Analogue Process Model is based on how the personal characteristics and the mental health issues of the client resonate with the client’s expression in the artistic process. The therapist tunes in with the client’s creative expression and explores alternative ways of thinking, feeling and acting together with the client through play and creativity (Smeijsters, 2006). Cognitive Behavioural Therapy (CBT) can be implemented in drama therapy, for instance in skills-based trainings (Cleven, 2004). The emphasis here is on ‘rationalising objectively what clients hear, where and when, based on the idea that thoughts influence the experience, just such as the feeling about and meaning of the thoughts’ (Cleven, 2004, p. 44, translated from Dutch). The dialectical behavioural therapy and schema therapy as sub-branches of CBT, are part of this school of thought in drama therapy (Cimmermans, 2014).

In England, by 1977 drama therapy was known as an alternative to psychodrama, and the first drama therapy courses were established (Meldrum, 1994). According to Meldrum, Stanislavski, Artaud and Growtowski are influential on the practice of drama therapy in England. The work of Stanislavski provides ideas about character building, the use of unconscious material, the re-creation of feeling and improvisation (Meldrum, 1994). The work of Artaud was inspired by symbolism and was a response to the dominance of realism which he found to be too word-bound and moralistic (Styan, 2003). Artaud argued that emotion is not verbal in itself and thus words cannot communicate the fullness of the human experience. Growtowski’s Poor Theatre was characterized by the rediscovery of the religious and mythical roots of drama (Meldrum, 1994). The Sesame Institute for drama and movement therapy cannot be excluded when discussing important influences in the field of drama therapy in England. The institute was founded by Marian Lindkvist in the 1960s as a response to the dominant drug-oriented treatments of mental illnesses (Sesame Institute, 2014). Therapies are based on the key concepts of drama, movement, ritual, play, psyche and touch.

Today, drama therapy is practiced around the world and there are presently academic training programs in Britain, Germany, the Netherlands, Canada, Croatia, Israel and the United States.

== Core processes ==
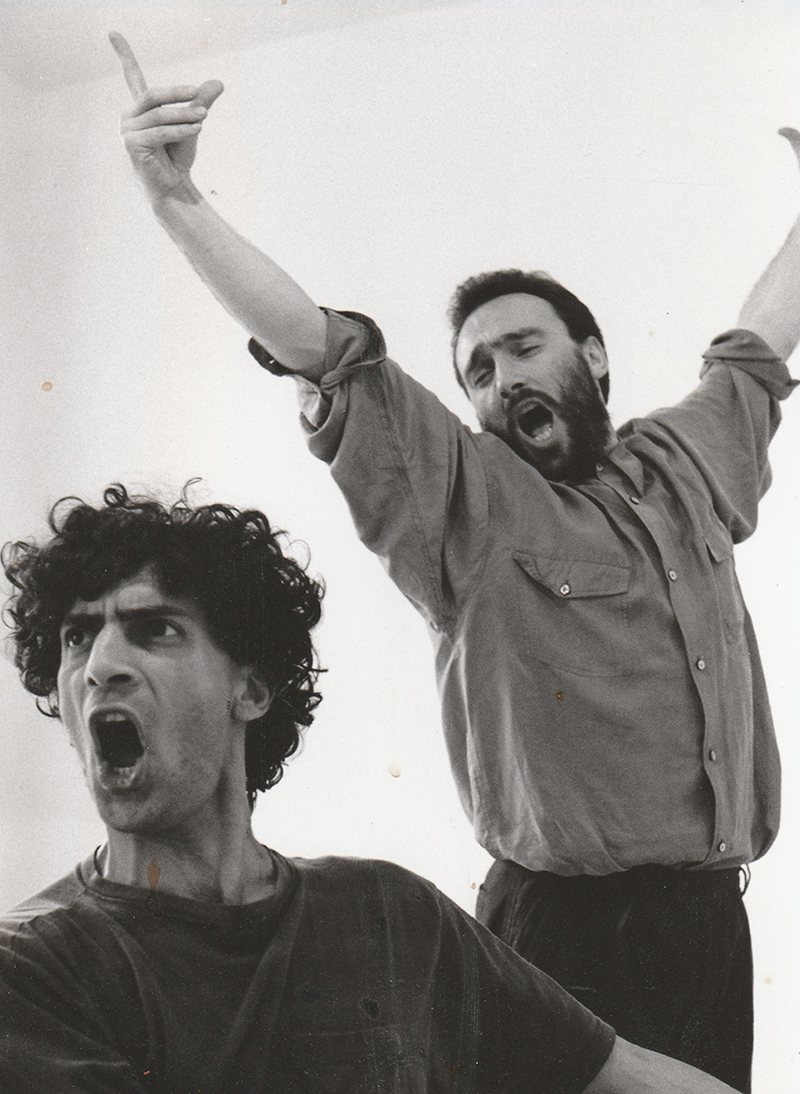
A psychotherapist using expressive therapy with a client

Phil Jones has written in his book Drama as Therapy, Theatre as Living that there are nine core processes at the heart of drama therapy. These include projective identification and dramatic distancing. Projective identification is the process whereby a person feels the feelings that the other is unable to access themselves. Dramatic distancing refers to the way that emotional and psychological problems can be accessed easier through metaphor. The client has a distanced relationship through metaphor to these problems that make them easier to tolerate.

== Becoming a drama therapist ==
In the US and Canada, the governing body is the North American Drama Therapy Association (NADTA), which establishes guidelines for the RDT (Registered Drama Therapist) credential and which provides accreditation for MA level programs and guidelines for alternative track training. In North America, Registered Drama Therapists hold a master's degree from one of five institutions accredited by the National Association for Drama Therapy: Antioch University at Seattle, Washington; Lesley University at Cambridge, Massachusetts; NYU Steinhardt at New York City, New York; California Institute of Integral Studies (CIIS) at San Francisco, California and Concordia University in Montreal, Quebec, Canada. Persons who hold a master's degree in a related field can be registered as a Drama Therapist by pursuing what is known as Alternate Route Training, which consists of graduate coursework and internships performed under the supervision of a board-certified trainer.

In The Netherlands, there are fulltime (voltijd) and parttime (deeltijd) Bachelor Dramatherapy qualifications, which are usually 4 years long. Institutions which offer the programs are University of Applied Sciences Hogeschool Arnhem and Nijmegen (HAN), Hogeschool Zuyd and Stenden Hogeschool. The Dutch professional body is the NvDt, the Nederlandse Vereniging voor Dramatherapie.

In the UK, the statutory regulator of drama therapists is the HCPC and the professional body is the British Association of Dramatherapists (BADth). There are currently four post-graduate training courses in Dramatherapy in the UK that lead to a qualification approved by the Health Professions Council, accredited by the British Association of Dramatherapists, and recognized by the Department of Health. These courses are offered at Roehampton University, University of Derby, Central School of Speech and Drama, and Anglia Ruskin University.

In China, drama therapy is an emerging field. It was first introduced to China in 2013. There have been a few organizations working on the field recently, such as Apollo, Xinyishe etc. The Hong Kong Association of Drama Therapists was established in 2009. Mr. Eddie Yu (President), Adeline Chan (Vice-president), Dorothy Wong and Kevin Ma are the founding members. Missions are to promote the professional development of drama therapists in Hong Kong.

Many of these universities suggest specific subjects to complete at degree level in order to pursue a masters programme in drama therapy. Some of these include drama, psychology or another relevant profession.

== In practice ==
The field of drama therapy can be somewhat varied in terms of techniques and procedures. However, there are some general commonalities. At the center of drama, therapy are the elements of role and story. Participants in drama therapy follow roles to tell a story or perform a part, thus embracing a new perspective of the character and themselves. Another key element is space, or where the acting takes place. Other components of drama therapy include ritual, conflict, resistance, spontaneity, distance and catharsis.

Drama therapy works to shed light on feelings and behaviors of a person and helps teach them ways to manage and overcome obstacles they struggle with. Clive Barker has called this a "journey through our own psychic landscape." The hope is that by taking on specific roles a person can gain personal insight and break free from barriers. Though this process can be very beneficial and rewarding, it can be very difficult. Progressions and developments can be slow going, and participants may be resistant to the process.

Though drama therapy can be done individually, it is typically done in groups or community settings. Groups can involve hundreds of people at a time, but more commonly range from six to ten people in institutional settings. As a form of counseling drama therapy is usually private and doesn't involve spectators. The exception to this rule is therapeutic theatre, which blends the techniques of applied drama to drama therapy. Therapeutic theatre entails the performance of a group of people to a selected audience, making it somewhat public.

== See also ==
- Art therapy
- Applied improvisation
- Bibliotherapy
- Dance therapy
- Expressive therapies
- Forum theatre
- Music therapy
- Narrative therapy
- Nature therapy
- Playback Theatre
- Play therapy
- Psychodrama
- Psychology
- Role theory
- Theater games
- Theater of the Oppressed
- Theatre pedagogy
- Theraplay
