= The Lady from Yesterday =

1985 television film directed by Robert Day

- Genre: Drama
- Written by: Tim Maschler; Ken Pettus
- Directed by: Robert Day
- Starring: Wayne Rogers; Bonnie Bedelia
- Music by: Mark Snow
- Country of origin: United States
- Original language: English

Production
- Executive producer: Barry J. Weitz
- Producer: William J. Hole Jr.
- Production location: Houston
- Cinematography: R. Michael Stringer
- Editor: Ira Heymann
- Running time: 120 min.
- Production companies: Comworld Productions; Hearst Entertainment Productions; Houston Lady Productions

Original release
- Network: CBS
- Release: May 14, 1985

The Lady from Yesterday is a 1985 American made-for-television drama film directed by Robert Day and starring Wayne Rogers and Bonnie Bedelia.

== Plot ==
Craig Weston is a man who seems to have everything going for him- a wife, two daughters, money, power and a successful career. But then one day, his life is disrupted when a woman he had an affair with, and has not seen since his army days in Vietnam, shows up. She called him because she is dying and needs him to provide care for her son. He proceeds to risk everything just to convince his current family & boss to take the son into their lives.

== Cast ==
- Wayne Rogers as Craig Weston
- Bonnie Bedelia as Janet Weston
- Pat Hingle as Jim Bartlett
- Barrie Youngfellow as Rita Bartlett
- Blue Deckert as Sam Horton
- Bryan Price as Quan
- Tina Chen as Lien
- Ruth Kobart as Ida
- Paul Menzel as Howard Ames
- Nicole Benton as Kimberly Weston
- KaRan Neff Reed as Abby Weston
- Beulah Quo as Mai Ling Luong
