= Impro: Improvisation and the Theatre =

1979 book by Keith Johnstone

Improvisation and the Theatre
- Author: Keith Johnstone
- Language: English
- Subject: Acting
- Publisher: Faber and Faber
- Publication date: 1979
- Publication place: England
- ISBN: 9780571109890

Impro: Improvisation and the Theatre is a book written in 1979 by theatre educator Keith Johnstone. The book is divided into four sections: "Status", "Spontaneity", "Narrative Skills", and "Masks and Trance". Much of the book is based on his experiences as a teacher and as an associate director of the Royal Court Theatre in London.
