= Dudley Riggs =

American comedian (1932–2020)

- Born: January 18, 1932; Little Rock, Arkansas
- Died: September 22, 2020 (aged 88); Minneapolis, Minnesota
- Occupations: Improvisational comedian, theater owner
- Years active: 1950s-1990s
- Known for: Brave New Workshop

Dudley Riggs (January 18, 1932 – September 22, 2020) was an improvisational comedian who created the Instant Theater Company in New York, which later moved to Minneapolis to become the Brave New Workshop comedy troupe.

== Family and early career ==
Riggs was born in Little Rock, Arkansas and joined the circus when he was five years old. His family performed in a variety of acts with the Ringling Bros. and Barnum & Bailey Circus where he learned comedy in the vaudeville style. He worked as a circus aerialist, comedy acrobat, and clown. Later, he formed a group that toured the country during winters when the circus was not operating.

Audiences at shows put on by the troupe were often quite hostile toward the performers. After years of trying to appease the crowds with traditional performance styles, Riggs began to request input from them. As an example, he might ask "Who do you hate in this town?" If the audience replied, "the mayor," the performers would quickly improvise a scene about the mayor. At the time improvisation was a word primarily used to describe the actions of jazz musicians. Riggs was an admirer of jazz and avoided using the term himself, preferring the phrase "instant theater." Later, The New York Times critic called Riggs' performances "word jazz," while members of the Second City troupe visiting in the 1960s and 1970s referred to the shows as "spot improv".

One year, the booking agent for the troupe stated that he couldn't find anyplace willing to take the performers. In order to keep skills strong, Riggs rented a street-level space in New York City where group members could practice. People walking by could see what was going on by looking through the window, and passers-by soon began to offer money to watch rehearsals. Riggs began the Instant Theater Company in New York, which ran from 1954 to 1958.

Critic Walter Kerr was an early attendee, and was amazed by what he saw. He held off writing a review for three weeks because he couldn't believe that the performers were actually taking in the audience's ideas—Kerr was convinced that group members were calling upon accomplices for input and were using pre-arranged material. After realizing the authenticity of performances, he wrote a glowing review.

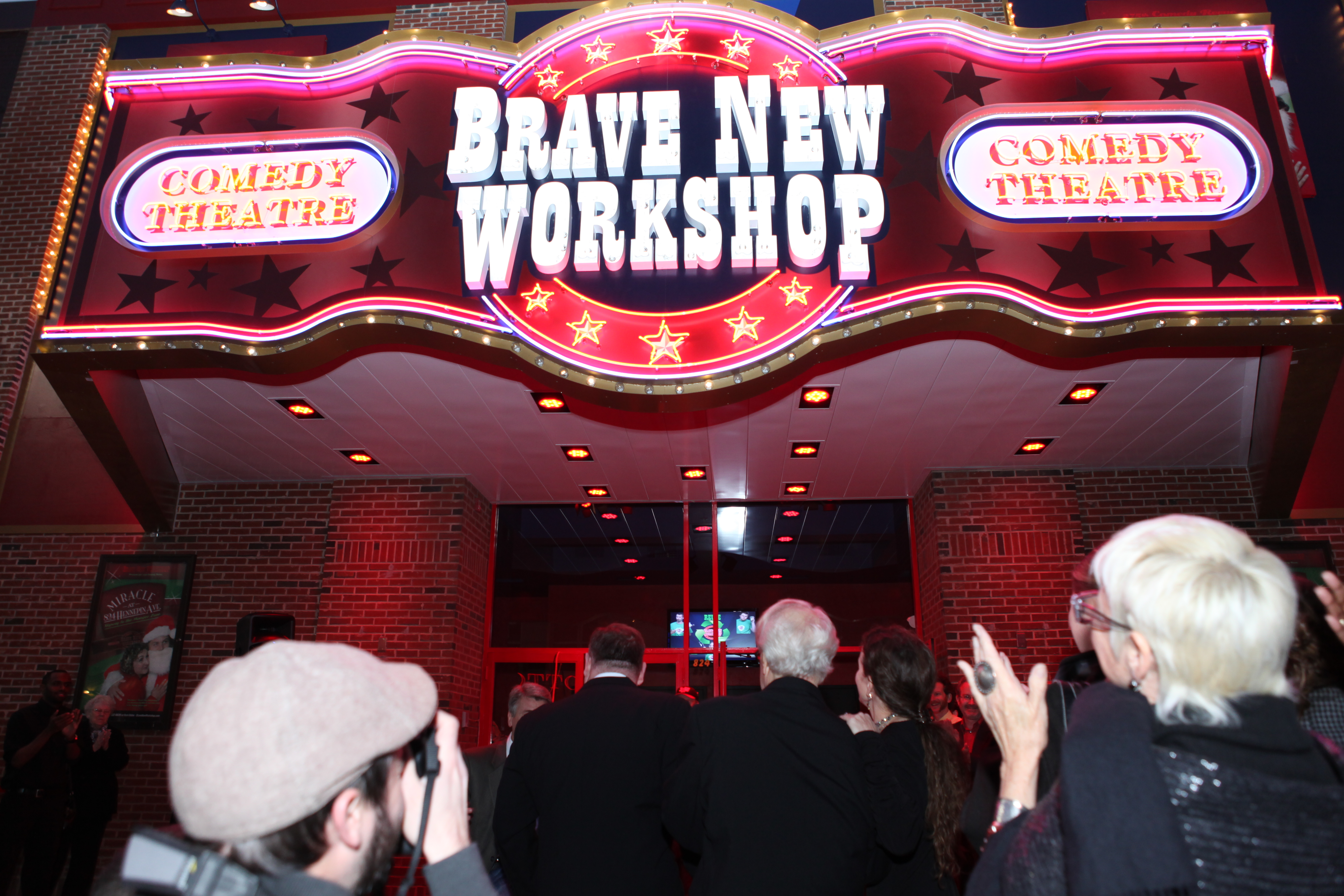
Brave New Workshop marquee

== Brave New Workshop ==
Riggs' improv group began touring before eventually settling in Minneapolis in 1958. Here, Riggs founded the Cafe Espresso on East Hennepin Avenue, where he operated the first espresso machine in the state while also providing a home for Instant Theater Company. After the café moved to South Hennepin Avenue in Uptown in 1965, claims of "the first espresso machine west of the Mississippi River" were also made. By 1961 the name had been changed to Brave New Workshop.

In 1971, Riggs opened the Experimental Theater Company (E.T.C.) in the Seven Corners area of Minneapolis, next to the University of Minnesota. This theater provided a wider range of material including comedy, variety shows, and specialty acts.

A number of famous performers started at the Brave New Workshop, including regional natives Louie Anderson and Al Franken, writers such as Pat Proft, television executive producer Linda Wallem, and scriptwriter and producer/director Peter Tolan.

There was some sharing of experience and technique between BNW and Second City in Chicago. Del Close worked with Riggs for a time, and members of both troupes were regulars at each other's shows when traveling.

After operating it for 39 years, Riggs sold the Brave New Workshop in 1997 to Mark Bergen, John Sweeney and Jenni Lilledahl. Bergen eventually moved on to other projects and Sweeney and Lilledahl continued to operate the theater and made some changes. Their focus is more on long-form improvisation, while Riggs had always been more focused on shorter individual sketches.

In 2017, the University of Minnesota Press published Riggs's memoir Flying Funny: My Life Without a Net. The memoir focuses on his early life in the circus and vaudeville, and the early development of improv, since the books Brave New Workshop by Ron Hubbard and Promiscuous Comedy by Irv Letofsky covered some later developments.

== Death ==
Riggs died in Minneapolis on September 22, 2020, aged 88.
