= New Theatre Quarterly =

Academic journal covering theatre studies

- Discipline: Theatre studies
- Language: English
- Edited by: Maria Shevtsova (Goldsmiths, University of London) and Simon Trussler (Rose Bruford College)

Publication details
- Former name: Theatre Quarterly
- History: 1985 to present
- Publisher: Cambridge University Press (England)
- Frequency: Quarterly

Standard abbreviations
- ISO 4: New Theatre Q.

Indexing
- ISSN: 0266-464X (print); 1474-0613 (web)
- LCCN: 85643629
- OCLC no.: 939216787

Links
- Journal homepage

New Theatre Quarterly (NTQ) is a peer-reviewed academic journal covering theatre studies. It is published by Cambridge University Press. New Theatre Quarterly succeeds Theatre Quarterly (1971–81). Over the years, NTQ has developed a reputation for a "down-to-earth approach" to theatre studies.

The co-editors-in-chief are Drew Milne of the University of Cambridge and Eva Urban-Devereux of Dundalk Institute of Technology, Ireland. Maria Shevtsova of Goldsmiths, University of London is the editor emeritus. Former co-editors were Simon Trussler of Rose Bruford College (1942–2019) and Clive Barker (1931–2005). Trussler and Barker were the journals founding editors.

== Abstracting and indexing ==
The journal is abstracted and indexed in:

- Academic Search Premier
- Arts & Humanities Citation Index
- Current Contents / Arts & Humanities
- Expanded Academic ASAP
- MLA International Bibliography
