= Yes, and ... =

Rule-of-thumb in improvisational comedy

"Yes, and ...", also referred to as "Yes, and ... thinking", is a rule-of-thumb in improvisational theater that suggests that an improviser should accept what another improviser has stated ("yes") and then expand on that line of thinking ("and"). The principle does not forbid disagreements between the improvisers' characters, but states that one should not reject the basic premises introduced by the other person, as this would throw them off and harm the flow of the scene.

The principle is also used in business and other fields for improving the effectiveness of the brainstorming process, fostering effective communication, and encouraging the free sharing of ideas.

The "Yes, and ..." rule is complemented by the "No, but ..." technique, which serves to refine and challenge ideas in a constructive manner.

== Principles ==
The "Yes" portion of the rule encourages the acceptance of the contributions added by others. Participants in an improvisation are encouraged to agree to a proposition, fostering a sense of cooperation rather than shutting down the suggestion and effectively ending the line of communication.

In an organizational setting, saying "Yes" in theory encourages people to listen and be receptive to the ideas of others. Rather than immediately judging the idea, as judgment has its place later on in the development process, one should initially accept the idea, which enables the discussion to expand on the idea without limitations. The next step in the process is to add new information into the narrative. The concept of "and" is to sway away from directly changing the suggested material, "and" rather building upon it. Additionally, and often overlooked, the "And" encourages self-awareness, confidence, and expressive skills which are necessary for setting limits, asking for help, giving feedback, delegating and even the ability to say "No".

== Analysis ==
Despite the popularity in recent years of "Yes, and ..." as a sort of slogan among many practitioners, there is hardly universal consensus regarding its authenticity and value. Gary Schwartz argues that it runs counter to the most basic tenets of improvisation. Schwartz states that he never heard Viola Spolin propose anything similar and that in fact she would have been categorically opposed to it. He argues that the slogan "misses the point of total relation needed in improvised theater." To Schwartz, it substantially interferes with the natural flow experience of the group and generally reduces the project of improvisation to "information sharing" and rapid-fire entertainment, led by the wittiest performers, resulting in "uninspired, 'talky' and not very theatrical" work. According to Schwartz, Spolin's formula contrasts completely with the intellectualization and urgent planning involved under "Yes, and ...": "by sharing a deep non-intellectual connection where mind and body work harmoniously as in play, spontaneity and true improvisation appears." He advises replacing "Yes, and ..." with a more elemental mantra frequently used by Spolin: "Follow the follower!"
