= Clive Barker (editor) =

English actor and editor (1931–2005)

Clive Barker (29 June 1931 – 17 March 2005) was an English theatre performer, acting coach and a co-editor of New Theatre Quarterly.

== Theatre professional ==
Clive Barker was born in Middlesbrough, the son of a steel worker. He trained to be a stage manager at the Bristol Old Vic School and afterward joined Joan Littlewood's theatre group. There he had important roles in Brendan Behan's The Hostage (1958) and Oh! What a Lovely War (1963). His debut as a director was Shelagh Delaney's The Lion in Love (1960). At the end of this career, he had become an "innovative spirit at the heart of theatre studies", according to the obituary in The Guardian.

He bridged the gap between on the one hand theatre studies at British universities, and on the other the professional theatre; many previous theatre scholars (among them Allardyce Nicoll) had called for well-versed academics who had practical experience as theatre artists. Barker's actor training book, Theatre Games (1977), was based on the model of the scholar/clown and grew to be very influential among theatre practitioners and teachers in many countries. The manual includes advice, instructions for games, and theories of performance; it enjoyed frequent citation for decades. The book's success led to Barker teaching acting courses "at the highest levels" internationally. The book's method was attractive to those working in conventional and alternative theatre. Barker himself was devoted to unconventional forms of theatre. His last professional service was, on the day he died, instructing a group of children with cerebral palsy.

== Academic career ==
Barker's career in university teaching, academic publishing, and theatre research stretched over decades. In 1967 he joined the Drama Department at University of Birmingham. Barker was Associate Director at the Northcott Theatre in Exeter from 1974, while Geoffrey Reeves was Director. He directed plays such as Salad Days (Julian Slade) and Trees in the Wind (John McGrath). He played the inspector in An Inspector Calls (J. B. Priestley). In 1976 he moved on to the University of Warwick's Theatre Studies Department.

He retired in 1993. For 25 years, he was a co-editor of Theatre Quarterly (after 1985: New Theatre Quarterly); the journal is devoted to all epochs and styles of theatrical performance and Barker often published essays in it. The journal aimed to "provide a lively international forum where theatrical scholarship and practice can meet, and where prevailing dramatic assumptions can be subjected to vigorous critical questioning."

Together with Maggie Gale, Barker published a book about British theatre between the two World Wars. The Cambridge University Press book was meant to reassess mid-twentieth-century British theatre cultures. Therefore the authors analyzed popular productions, and even low-brow commercial successes of types such as detective plays and musical comedy. They also described development in staging historical pageantry and the trend toward politicized productions of Shakespeare. In her review, Linda Renton called it "a vivid account not only of drama on stage, but of the perceptions and preoccupations of the audience for which these dramas were written."

== Personal life ==
Barker had six children.

== Select publications ==
- Theatre games (New York: 1st edition 1977, several editions followed) ISBN 978-1-4081-2519-9
- with Maggie B. Gale: British Theatre Between the Wars, 1918–1939 (Cambridge 2007) ISBN 978-0-521-62407-7
- Clive Barker, A Brief History of Clive Barker. New Theatre Quarterly 23.4 (2007), p. 295–303.

== Links ==
- Baz Kershaw, Innovative spirit at the heart of theatre studies (obituary) printed in The Guardian 19 April 2005
- Warwick University's Clive Barker Award
