= Keith Johnstone =

British drama teacher (1933–2023)

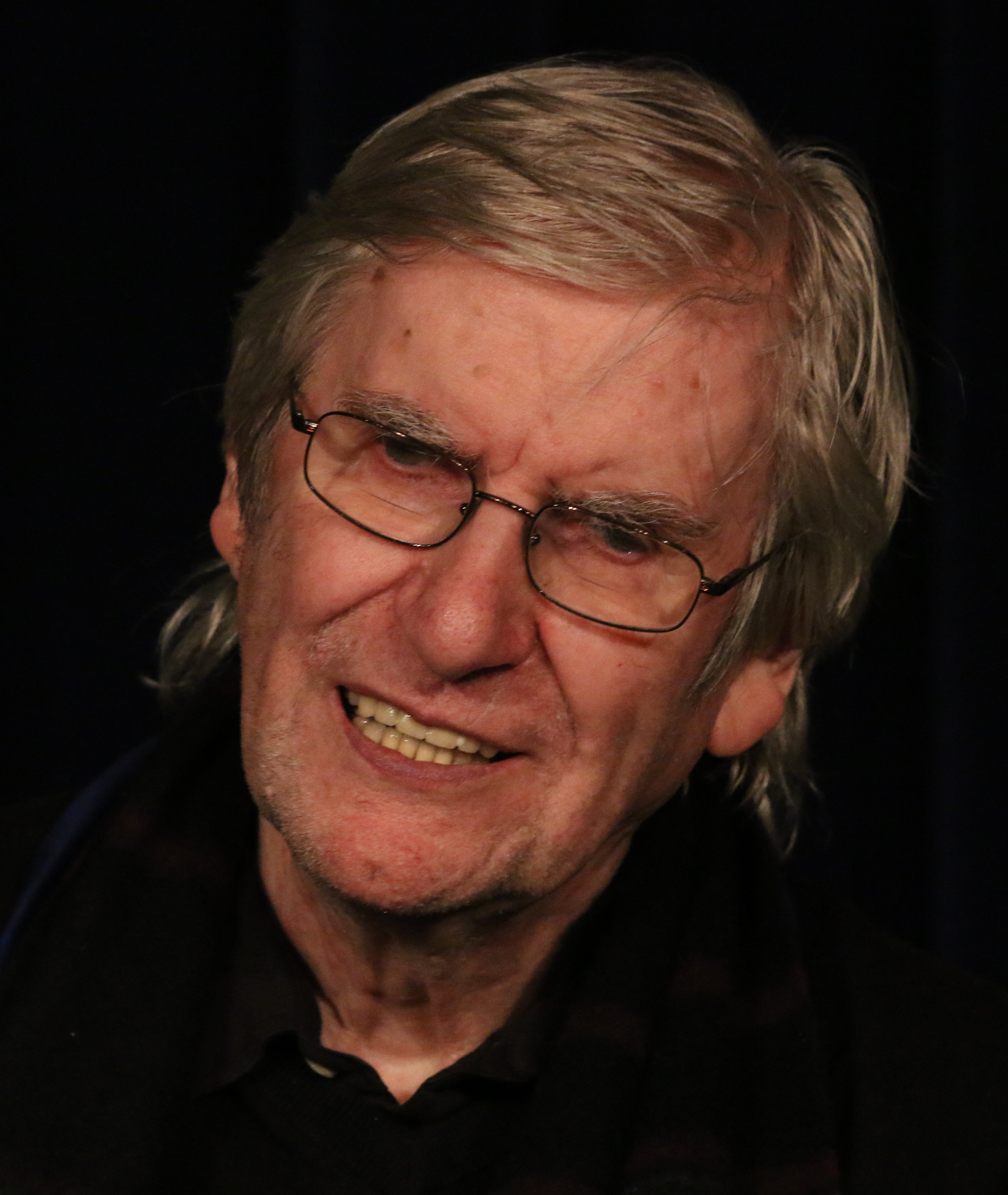
- Johnstone in 2017
- Born: Donald Keith Johnstone; 21 February 1933; Brixham, England
- Died: 11 March 2023 (aged 90); Calgary, Alberta, Canada
- Education: St Luke's College Exeter
- Occupations: Theatre educator; director; writer
- Years active: 1956–2018
- Known for: Work in improvisational theatre
- Spouse: Ingrid von Darl (div. 1981)
- Children: 2
- Website: www.keithjohnstone.com

Donald Keith Johnstone (21 February 1933 – 11 March 2023) was a British-Canadian educator and theatre director. A pioneer of improvisational theatre, he was best known for inventing the Impro System, (Note: The term Impro System was coined by Dudeck in the 2013 biography to identify Keith Johnstone’s theories, techniques, exercises, games, terminology, and pedagogy.) part of which are the Theatresports. He was also an educator, playwright, actor and theatre director.

== Life ==
Donald Keith Johnstone was born in 1933 in Brixham, Devon, England. He grew up hating school, finding that it blunted his imagination and made him feel self-conscious and shy. After attending St Luke's College Exeter, he taught at a working-class school in Battersea, London in the early 1950s, before being commissioned to write a play by the Royal Court Theatre in 1956. He subsequently became a play-reader, director and drama teacher there, where he chose to reverse all that his teachers had told him in an attempt to create more spontaneous actors. From 1973 to 1975 he was a professor at Queens University in Kingston Ontario Canada. His play Shot By An Elk was first produced at Queens University. In 1975, Johnstone moved to Calgary, Alberta to teach at the University of Calgary, where he remained until retiring in 1995.

Johnstone is featured in the book Blink: The Power of Thinking Without Thinking by Canadian journalist Malcolm Gladwell.

Johnstone was married to Ingrid von Darl until their divorce in 1981. They had one son, Benjamin Johnstone who had one son, Cort Dawnne, and Johnstone had a second son from another relationship. He died at Rockyview General Hospital in Calgary on 11 March 2023, at the age of 90.

== Work ==
Johnstone developed his training system at the Loose Moose Theatre, which he co-founded in 1977. He retired as artistic director in 1998, but remained involved with the company and continued to work as an educator until 2018, amid a decline in his health.

Johnstone's work with performers comprised a vast collection of training games, exercises and lazzi. He wrote two books about his system; 1979's Impro: Improvisation and the Theatre, and 1998's Impro For Storytellers.

Johnstone's teaching was described as a reversal of the lessons he received as a child in postwar Britain. Writing in The Guardian in 2009, Mark Ravenhill said about him, "Whereas his teachers told him to think more, he'll tell his students to think less. He was advised to plan a story before it was written. Now he says: listen to an audience and let the tale tell itself".

Johnstone was known for slogans that encapsulated his philosophy of improvisation, and included:

- "You can't learn anything without failing"
- "Please don't do your best. Trying to do your best is trying to be better than you are"
- "Go onto stage to make relationships. At least you won't be alone."
- "It's not the offer, but what you do with it."
- "Allow yourself to see the audience as interesting and attractive."

== Selected publications ==
- 1979 Impro: Improvisation and the Theatre, ISBN 9780878301171
- 1998 Impro For Storytellers, ISBN 0571190995
