= Action Theatre (Ruth Zaporah) =

Improvisational performance technique

Action Theater is an improvisational performance technique developed by the American performance artist, Ruth Zaporah. Action Theatre is defined by its focus on embodied awareness, the tracking of the present moment through sensory experience, and by a structured training that uses exploration to build the performer's 'formal dexterity and the ability to “listen” to oneself and one’s acting partners'. This physical theatre technique is documented in Zaporah's 1995 book, Action Theatre: The Improvisation of Presence.

== Origin ==
Action Theater evolved from the explosion of interdisciplinary performance in the San Francisco Bay Area in the 1970s, which included Contact Improvisation performance groups and Anna Halprin. Zaporah is described as one of the 'leading lights of the Bay Area's thriving experimental theater scene of the 1970s and '80s' and as a 'master teacher ... whose work blurs the edges between modern dance and mime'. She trained in modern dance (with Merce Cunningham, Alwin Nikolais and Martha Graham) and participated in the theater and movement experiments of the '60s; it is said she 'embodies play that's dead serious'.

Action Theater is a training technique and practice that Ruth Zaporah developed over a twenty-year period in the San Francisco Bay Area.
