= Dan K. Webb =

American lawyer (born 1945)

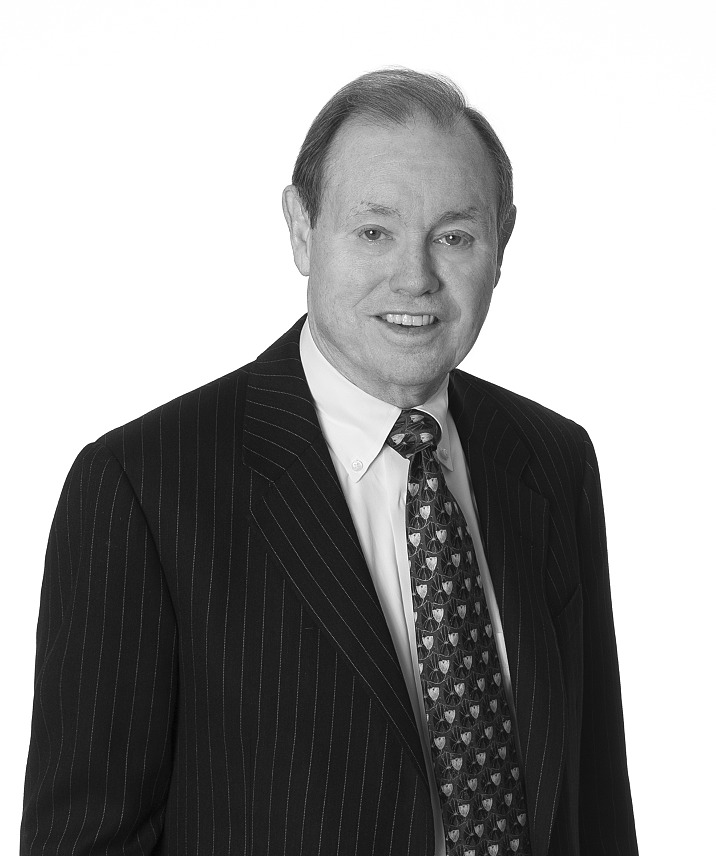

Special Counsel for the United States Department of Justice in the Iran–Contra affair
- In office 1990–1991
- Appointed by: Lawrence Walsh

United States Attorney for the Northern District of Illinois
- In office 1981–1985
- President: Ronald Reagan
- Preceded by: Thomas P. Sullivan
- Succeeded by: Anton R. Valukas

Personal details
- Born: September 5, 1945 (age 81) Bushnell, Illinois, U.S.
- Party: Republican
- Spouse: Laura Webb
- Children: 5
- Education: Western Illinois University (BA); Loyola University, Chicago (JD)

Daniel K. Webb (born September 5, 1945) is an American lawyer and public official. He is the co-executive chairman of the international law firm of Winston Taylor. He is a former United States Attorney for the Northern District of Illinois and previously served as the Special Counsel in the Iran-Contra affair. As the United States Attorney for the Northern District of Illinois, he was the top federal law enforcement official in the city of Chicago on behalf of the United States Department of Justice. As U.S. Attorney, Webb led Operation Greylord and successfully prosecuted 76 corrupt judges, police officers, court clerks, and lawyers.

== Early life ==
Webb grew up in Bushnell, in west central Illinois. His father was a mail carrier, and his mother a dental assistant.

Webb graduated from Western Illinois University in Macomb, Illinois. Webb attended Loyola University Chicago School of Law, receiving a J.D. in 1970.

== Government service ==
=== United States attorney ===
Webb is a former United States Attorney for the Northern District of Illinois, serving from 1981 to 1985. From 1970 to 1976, he was an assistant U.S. attorney in the special prosecutions division of the U.S. attorney's office of the Northern District of Illinois. In 1990, Webb received international attention for his prosecution of retired Admiral John Poindexter in the Iran-Contra affair. The convictions were overturned on appeal.

As a federal prosecutor in Illinois, he gained fame for his lead role in the Operation Greylord investigations into judicial corruption in Cook County, Illinois.

Alongside Rudy Giuliani, current attorney to President Trump and former Mayor of New York City and United States Attorney for the Southern District of New York, Webb co-founded the Organized Crime Drug Enforcement Task Force (OCDETF). To date, OCDETF, which comprises 2,500 law enforcement agents from eleven federal agencies including the FBI, DEA, ATF, ICE, IRS, U.S. Marshals Service, and U.S. Customs and Border Protection, has conducted operations that have led to 44,000 drug-related convictions and the seizure of over $3 billion in cash and property assets.

The Department of Justice considered appointing Webb as special prosecutor to examine President Bill Clinton's role in the Whitewater controversy but Webb declined due to an extensive case load.

=== Iran-Contra affair ===
Webb previously served as Special Counsel in the Iran-Contra affair and successfully prosecuted Admiral John Poindexter, President Ronald Reagan's National Security Advisor, for lying to the United States Congress and obstructing their investigations. Admiral Poindexter's conviction was overturned on appeal in 1991. Webb famously deposed President Reagan during his investigation.

== Appointments as special prosecutor ==
=== State of Illinois, Cook County ===
In 2012, Webb was the special prosecutor in the case involving David Koschman, who died after being punched by the nephew of then-Chicago Mayor, Richard M. Daley. On August 23, 2019, Webb was appointed as the special prosecutor in the Jussie Smollett case.

== Private practice ==
After leaving public service, his focus was on defense, especially of white-collar crime and allegations of corporate malfeasance. He was lead defense trial counsel for General Electric in a price-fixing case; represented Microsoft in antitrust litigation; and represented Philip Morris in its tobacco-related litigation.

He is the co-executive chairman of Winston & Strawn, an international law firm with nearly 1,000 attorneys in 16 offices in the United States, Europe, Asia, and the Middle East, with gross revenue of $985 million in 2017. According to Chambers and Partners, Webb is one of the top seven trial lawyers in the United States. Webb represented Bill Gates and Microsoft in the United States v. Microsoft Corp, the New York Stock Exchange as chief counsel in a dispute involving $120 million in compensation paid to their former chairman and CEO Richard Grasso, General Electric in a price-fixing case, Philip Morris in its $300 billion tobacco-related litigation, Verizon in obtaining a $58 million verdict in a patent litigation matter with Vonage, Guggenheim Partners in litigation related to their $2.2 billion acquisition of the Los Angeles Dodgers, Beef Products Inc. in obtaining over $177 million, the largest ever settlement in the United States for a media defamation case, and other Fortune 100 corporations in litigation including BP, Boeing, JPMorgan Chase, Ernst & Young, Pfizer, and Deloitte. Webb has tried over 100 jury cases.

Webb has represented numerous politicians in high-profile matters, including the Governor of Illinois George Ryan, Chicago Congressman Jesse Jackson Jr., Chicago Congressman Dan Rostenkowski, and Detroit Mayor Kwame Kilpatrick.

Webb represented the New York Stock Exchange as chief counsel in connection with an internal investigation over compensation to their former chairman and CEO Richard Grasso and currently represents the NYSE in subsequent litigation. Following Webb's internal investigation, summarized in what is now known as the "Webb Report," the New York Attorney General sued Grasso for the return of more than $120 million in compensation. He represented Beef Products Inc. in obtaining the largest ever settlement in the United States for a media defamation case. Disney reported that it paid Beef Products $177 million more than its insurance coverage to settle the case. Webb has also represented Jack Welch, former chairman and CEO of General Electric, in his divorce and numerous personal matters, the city of Ferguson, Missouri to negotiate and litigate reforms with the United States Department of Justice following the shooting of Michael Brown, the children of Hyatt hotel heir Robert Pritzker in connection with allegations that their family trust funds were looted of about $1 billion, and billionaire Rishi Shah's Outcome Health in an internal investigation, following an exposé in The Wall Street Journal that alleged employees misled advertising clients. Alongside David Boies, lead counsel to Al Gore in Bush v. Gore that determined the 2000 United States Presidential Election, Webb represented $9 billion hedge fund Amaranth Advisors in the firm's dissolution. In January 2016, Webb was retained by the city of Chicago to conduct an independent review of their legal department, after it was alleged in a lawsuit that a city attorney hid evidence of a fatal police shooting.

Webb also represented the nephew of President John F. Kennedy, William Kennedy Smith, in litigation alleging sexual harassment.

Other corporations that Webb has represented include American Airlines, Alcoa, Charles Schwab, ConocoPhillips, Cisco Systems, Heinz, Bacardi, Cargill, State Farm, Motorola, and Express Scripts.

Fox News hired Webb to defend it in Dominion v. Fox News Network.

In 2023, Pat Fitzgerald retained Webb to represent him following his firing as head coach of Northwestern Wildcats football team as a result of the school's hazing scandal.

=== George H. Ryan ===
Webb served as lead defense counsel in the six-month jury trial of the former Governor of Illinois George H. Ryan on public corruption charges, including racketeering, mail fraud, and income tax fraud.

His representation of the city of Chicago in an internal investigation was estimated to have cost the city over $3.5 million, and Webb's defense of Governor Ryan at trial was estimated to have cost the Governor over $10 million. Loyola University named its nationally recognized Center for Advocacy as the Dan K. Webb Center for Advocacy to honor his distinguished career.

=== Donald Trump ===
In March 2018, the President of the United States, Donald Trump, asked Webb to represent him personally and to lead his defense team in connection with Robert Mueller's Special Counsel investigation into the role of Trump's presidential campaign in Russian interference in the 2016 United States elections. Webb declined to represent the President. He issued a statement to The Washington Post that the president's overture was the "highest honor" but that "business conflicts" prevented him from representing President Trump. Abbe Lowell, Webb's partner at law firm Winston & Strawn, represents the President's son-in-law Jared Kushner and daughter Ivanka Trump in the investigation, and Webb represents billionaire Dmitry Firtash, a business partner of Paul Manafort, the former chairman of Donald Trump's presidential campaign. Webb represents Firtash alongside both Lanny Davis, defense counsel to President Trump's former personal lawyer Michael Cohen, and attorney Michael Chertoff, former United States Secretary of Homeland Security.

Alongside Lanny Davis, defense attorney for President Trump's former lawyer Michael Cohen, Webb also represents billionaire Ukrainian oligarch Dmitry Firtash should he be extradited to the United States to face charges of bribery. Firtash bid alongside business partner Paul Manafort, former chairman of Donald Trump's presidential campaign, to acquire the New York Drake Hotel, and is an associate of former Ukrainian Presidents Viktor Yushchenko and Viktor Yanukovych.

=== Recognition and awards ===
Webb received his own profile in The New York Times, Need a Superlawyer? Take a Number, and according to Bloomberg, he is recognized consistently as one of the most sought-after trial lawyers in the United States. According to The Wall Street Journal, Webb is one of the country's most highly regarded litigators, and according to the Los Angeles Times, Webb is one of the nation's leading trial attorneys. Webb was ranked the number one litigator in the United States by Euromoney's Guide to the World's Leading Litigation Lawyers, the top litigation expert in the United States by Guide to the World's Leading Lawyers, and Law360 named Winston & Strawn, led by Webb, as Trial Group Of The Year for 2018. Jenner & Block chairman Anton R. Valukas, bankruptcy examiner in the Bankruptcy of Lehman Brothers, called Webb "a stunningly good trial lawyer", and Brendan Sullivan, defense counsel in the Duke lacrosse case, remarked that Webb is "one of the most formidable courtroom lawyers in America today". During his tenure as U.S. Attorney, Nina Totenberg of NPR called Webb "the best prosecutor I have ever laid eyes on". Webb is admitted to the United States Supreme Court and allowed to practice law before the court. Webb is known to bill at nearly $1,400 an hour.

Business Insider named Webb one of "11 Lawyers You Definitely Don't Want to See Across the Aisle", and The Legal 500 listed Webb as one of the top 10 trial lawyers in the United States. In addition to being named the number one litigator in the United States and the top litigation expert in the United States, Webb was also named the number one white-collar criminal defense attorney by Corporate Crime Reporter. Webb was named one of the 100 Most Influential Lawyers in America by The Best Lawyers in America. Lawdragon included Webb on its 2017 Hall of Fame and on Lawdragon 500: The Legends.

== Politics ==
Webb rejected attempts by the Cook County Republican Party to persuade him to run for mayor of Chicago in 1987. He, however, did agree to head a search committee to help the party find a willing candidate.

== Personal life ==
Webb is married to Laura, they have five children, and live in Burr Ridge, a suburb of Chicago. None of their children has become a lawyer.

In 2017, Webb participated in a televised mock trial on C-SPAN of William Shakespeare's play Twelfth Night, presented by The Shakespeare Theatre Company. Webb argued on behalf of main character Sebastian and the mock trial was judged by President Barack Obama's nominee to the United States Supreme Court, Judge Merrick Garland. Pamela Talkin, Marshal of the United States Supreme Court, served as marshal of the mock trial.
