= Sharat Raju =

American director and writer

- Born: 1 December 1976 (age 49); Chicago, Illinois, U.S.
- Education: University of Michigan (BA); American Film Institute (MFA)
- Occupations: Filmmaker, Director
- Years active: 2003–present
- Spouse: Valarie Kaur
- Relatives: Manu Raju (brother); Gopalakrishna Adiga (grandfather)

Sharat Raju is an American director and writer, known for making documentaries and films about the lives of immigrants in American society. Raju has also directed episodes of major American television series, including How to Get Away with Murder, Law & Order: Special Victims Unit, Once Upon a Time, and others.

== Early life and education ==
Raju was born in Chicago and raised in Darien, Illinois. Raju's brother, Manu Raju, is a journalist who works as the Senior Congressional Correspondent for CNN. Raju's grandfather, Gopalakrishna Adiga, was a prominent Kannada poet of India. Raju attended Hinsdale South High School before earning a Bachelor of Arts degree in English from the University of Michigan, where he was the sports editor of The Michigan Daily and worked as a freelance reporter for the Daily Herald. Raju then earned a Master of Fine Arts in Directing from the American Film Institute.

== Career ==
Raju co-founded the Yale Visual Law Project and co-produced three documentary short films as a visiting fellow at the Information Society Project. Raju’s first film, American Made, which starred Kal Penn and Sakina Jaffrey, won 17 film festival awards and aired nationally on Independent Lens. American Made was Raju's master's thesis film produced while studying at the American Film Institute.

In September 2004, Raju was named by Esquire as one of the 20 young film directors to watch. Prior to graduate school, he worked for casting director Mali Finn on feature films including 8 Mile, The Matrix Revolutions, and The Matrix Reloaded.

Raju has collaborated on many of his works with his wife, Valarie Kaur. Divided We Fall (2008) was Raju's first film created in partnership with his wife. The couple has made other documentary films including Stigma (2011), which highlights the impact of New York City police’s “Stop and Frisk” policy; Alienation (2011), about immigration raids; The Worst of the Worst: Portrait of a Supermax (2012), a documentary on the use of solitary confinement in prison; and Oak Creek: In Memorium (2012), a short film about the 2012 mass shooting at a Sikh gurdwara in Wisconsin. He has also directed episodes of Scandal, How to Get Away With Murder, NCIS: New Orleans, Criminal Minds, and Mistresses.

Raju has written columns for HuffPost and Filmmaker Magazine.

== Personal life ==
Raju lives with his wife Valarie Kaur in Los Angeles.

== Filmography ==
=== Television ===
Year	Title	Episode	Notes
2014-15	Law & Order: Special Victims Unit	2 episodes	
2015	Finding Carter	Episode: "The Sheltering Sky"	
2016	Grimm	Episode: "Inugami"	
2016	Mistresses	2 episodes	
2016	How to Get Away with Murder	Episode: "Is Someone Really Dead?"	
2016-17	Scandal	3 episodes	
2016–2026	Criminal Minds	8 episodes	
2017	Once Upon a Time	2 episodes	
2017	NCIS: New Orleans	Episode: "The Last Stand"	
2017	The Catch	Episode: "The Bad Girl"	
2017-18	Designated Survivor	2 episodes	
2018	MacGyver	Episode: "Benjamin Franklin + Grey Duffle"	
2018	Good Girls	Episode: "Special Sauce"	
2018-22	Fear the Walking Dead	4 episodes	
2018	The Good Doctor	Episode: "Carrots"	
2019	Proven Innocent	Episode: "Living and Dying in East Cleveland"	
2020	The Walking Dead: World Beyond	Episode: "The Tyger and the Lamb"	
2020-22	The Walking Dead	4 episodes	
2020-21	9-1-1: Lone Star	2 episodes	
2021	9-1-1	Episode: "There Goes the Neighborhood"	
2021	FBI	Episode: "Fire & Rain"	
2022	Bosch: Legacy	Episode: "Chain of Authenticity"	

== See also ==
- Valarie Kaur
