= Hinsdale Central High School =

Public secondary school in Hinsdale, Illinois, US

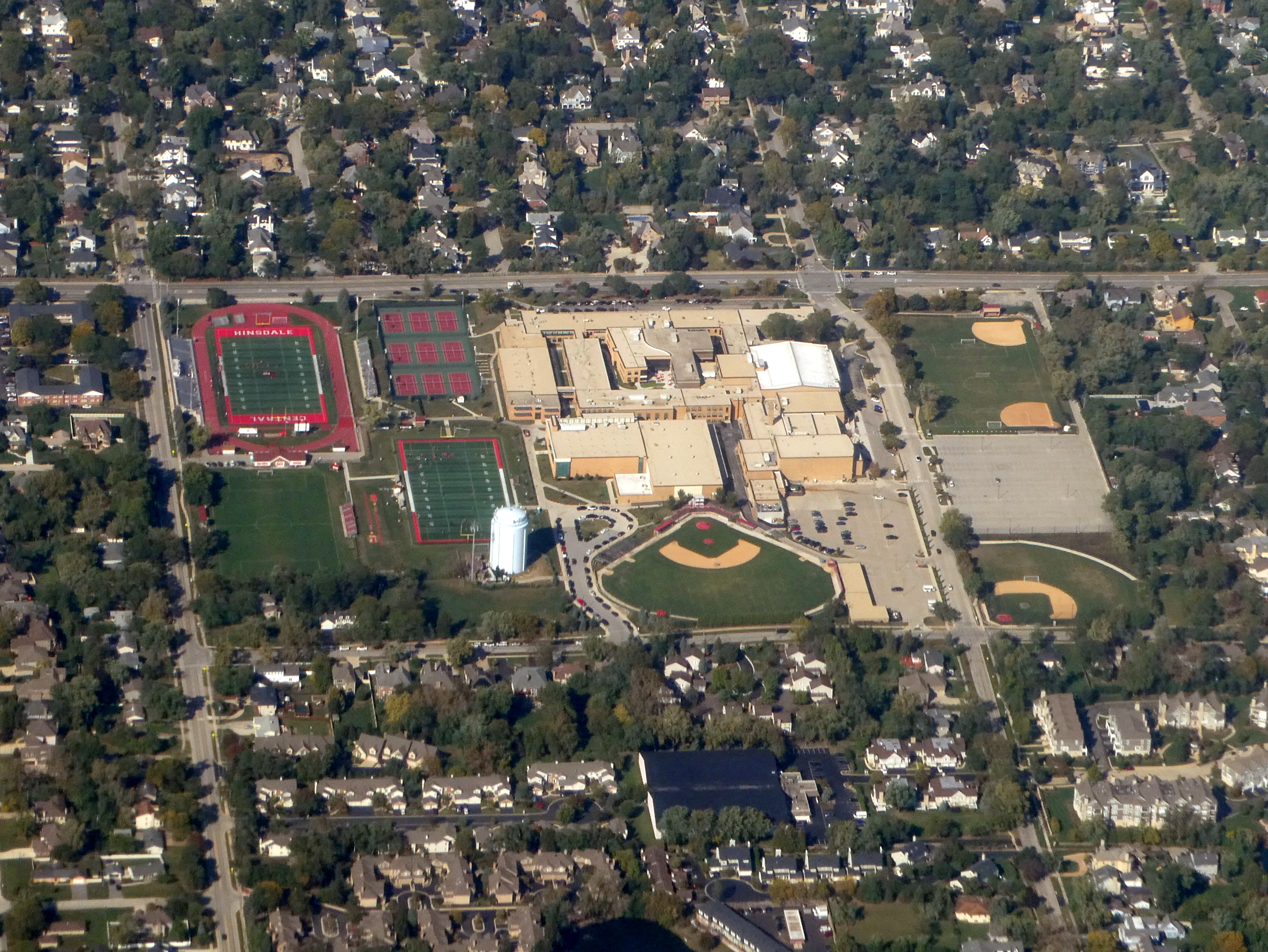

Location
- 5500 South Grant Street; Hinsdale, Illinois 60521; United States; 41°47′14″N 87°56′0″W

Information
- School type: Public secondary
- Opened: 1879
- School district: Hinsdale Township High School District 86
- Superintendent: Michael Lach
- Principal: William Walsh
- Teaching staff: 189.58 (FTE)
- Grades: 9–12
- Gender: Coed
- Enrollment: 2,436 (2023-2024)
- Student to teacher ratio: 12.85
- Campus: Suburban
- Colors: Red; White
- Athletics conference: West Suburban Conference
- Nickname: Red Devils
- Rival: Lyons Township High School
- Publication: Solstice
- Newspaper: Devils' Advocate
- Yearbook: El Diablo
- Website: https://central.hinsdale86.org/

Hinsdale Central High School, or HCHS (locally referred to as simply "Central"), is a public four-year high school located at the corner of W. 55th St. and S. Grant St. in Hinsdale, Illinois, a western suburb of Chicago, Illinois. It is located in the United States. Founded in 1879, the school is well known for its large spending per student, academic excellence, and athletic programs. It is part of Hinsdale Township High School District 86, which also includes Hinsdale South High School. The school is 17 miles west of Chicago and serves a suburban residential area of approximately 35,000 people. The Central campus draws its students from all of the village of Hinsdale, majority of Clarendon Hills and Oak Brook, and small parts of Burr Ridge, Darien, Willowbrook and Westmont.

The official name of the school is Hinsdale Township High School Central, often abbreviated Hinsdale TWP HS Central. This name is derived from the school's original name: Hinsdale Township High School (HTHS). "Central" was added to the original name when Hinsdale South High School opened in 1965.

== History ==
The high school began as a single classroom added in 1879 to the elementary school, then known as South Side School. The classroom was added when community members saw the need for education beyond eighth grade. All twelve grades shared the ca. 1866 schoolhouse, built at Garfield and Third Streets by William Robbins. At this time, there were five teachers, including the principal, teaching about 120 students grades 1 through 12. The first high school class graduated in 1883 and had four students: Alice Warren, Minnie Hinds, Grace Redfield, and Florence Webster.

In 1894 the school building burned, and was replaced by a new building on the same site. In 1911 the school district was reorganized, and the school became officially known as Hinsdale Township High School. In 1916 a new school building was completed nearby.

By the 1930s, a site for a new school to serve the growing community was purchased south of town at the corner of 55th and Grant Streets. Though a new football field was dedicated on this property in 1932, Depression and World War II constraints postponed construction until 1948. The current high school building was dedicated in 1950.

By the 1960s, two additional school sites were purchased. Hinsdale South High School opened in 1965 at the corner of Clarendon Hills Road and 75th Street in Darien. It was then that the word "Central" was added to the name of the school. The other property at the corner of Midwest Road and 31st Street in Oak Brook, for a potential Hinsdale North High School, was later determined to be not needed, and was sold. This property now forms part of the Trinity Lakes Subdivision.

In 2004, the school underwent additional construction to alleviate crowded hallways and rebuild deteriorating parts of the building. The reconstruction included a new 5 million dollar library, extended cafeteria, and connected hallways greatly opening up the campus and improving the flow of traffic.

In 2007, it was the only high school in the country to be nominated as a Character Counts school and was named Character Counts School of the Year

In 2009, Hinsdale Central was named the National School Of Character by the Character Counts! organization.

In 2015, Hinsdale Central set a record, winning eight state athletic championships in a single season. The state championship teams included girls tennis, girls golf, boys wrestling, boys cross country, boys soccer, boys golf, boys swimming, and boys tennis.

In April 2019, a $140 million referendum was passed that would renovate the buildings of Hinsdale Central High School and Hinsdale South High School. Many Hinsdale Central Students were in favor of the referendum, citing outdated infrastructure and mold, and supported the Vote Yes campaign. The referendum would be passed in April with nearly 60% of voters voting in favor of the referendum.

In the years of 2021 and 2022, various construction projects within the referendum would be completed. In the summer of 2021, the Don Watson Aquatic Center replaced the old pool as the primary aquatics facility. The $20.5 million pool was mainly funded by the aforementioned 2019 referendum. The former pool was filled in and temporarily used as a multipurpose room. In addition, many classrooms received renovation and were fitted with new desks and chairs, whiteboards, carpets, and walls. In the spring of 2022, the Student Commons were constructed and replaced an old wing of the school that contained a few conference rooms. Within the Commons are a set of large steps that the administration referred to as the "Learning Stairs". The Activities Office and Counseling Department were also moved to section near the Student Commons. In the summer of 2022, more construction was completed. A new entrance on Grant Street known as the Grant Street Plaza replaced the old entrance to the old pool. A new band practice room was constructed. The multipurpose room from the 2021–2022 school year was converted to a gymnastics gym. The Student Cafeteria was also completely redone, with new floors and tables, as well as creating a new system of lunch lines. The basement of the school, where Career and Technical Education was taught, also received renovation, giving it wider spaces for woodworking, metalworking, and robotics classes.

== Academics ==
In 2021, Hinsdale Central High School was rated the 52nd best public high school in the U.S. and ranked #7 in Illinois-based high schools by Newsweek magazine's annual "America's Best High Schools" feature.

The Class of 2017 average SAT score was 1218, 8th in the state of Illinois. Hinsdale Central students, participating in an academically rigorous environment with a 13:1 student-to-teacher ratio.

== Demographics ==
The school had an enrollment of 2,472 students in the 2022–2023 school year. In the same year, 62% of students identified as non-Hispanic white, 22% were Asian or Asian-American, 10% were Hispanic or Latino, 4% were multiracial, and 2% were black or African-American. Around 6% of students are eligible for free or reduced price lunches. The school has a student to teacher ratio of 14.2.

== Student life ==
=== Athletics ===
The school competes within the Illinois High School Association (IHSA), and has won at least 106 state championships to date. Current sports include boys' and girls' lacrosse, basketball, bowling, cross country, golf, gymnastics, soccer, swimming, tennis, track and field, volleyball, and water polo.

In addition, the school has boys; baseball, football, and wrestling teams and girls' badminton, wrestling, and softball teams.

Furthermore, while not sponsored by the IHSA, the school also sponsors girls' lacrosse, and a boys' hockey team (known as the "Ice Devils").

=== Clubs and activities ===
The school offers eighty clubs, including community service organizations, academic competition teams, foreign language groups, and special interest clubs. Many clubs have won local and state awards and competitions.

The following IHSA sponsored competitive activities have finished in the top 4 of their respective state tournament:

- Chess: 3rd place (2009–10, 2010–11, 2013–14)
- Speech Individual Events: 3rd place (2007–08, 2013–14, 2019–20); State Champions (2014–15, 2018–19, 2025–26)
- Scholastic Bowl: 4th place (2021–2022); 2nd place (1997–98, 2001–02, 2014–15); State Champions (1991–92, 2015–16)

Additionally, while not sponsored by the IHSA but instead the ISBA, the Mock Trial team has earned similar distinction, holding the record for state championship titles across Illinois: 3rd place (1993, 1995, 2011, 2017, 2018); 2nd place (1989, 1992, 1998, 2000, 2014); State Champions (1988, 1990, 1991, 1994, 1996, 2005, 2009, 2010, 2012, 2013, 2015). The team has come closest of any Illinois team to winning the National Championship, earning 2nd place in 2010.

After their April 2022 4th place win in the State finals, the Illinois High School Association awarded one member of the Scholastic Bowl team with a trip to Africa. John Hines-Shah represented the team and visited Tanzania. The Junior Varsity Scholastic Bowl team is coached by Eric Gunnar Jensen, and the Varsity team is coached by Alan McCloud.

Hinsdale Central has a student-run newsmagazine named Devils' Advocate. In November 2013, the Devils' Advocate was awarded the National Scholastic Press Association Newspaper Pacemaker Award for the 2012–2013 school year's publication.

== Notable alumni ==
The Hinsdale Central Foundation has established a Hall of Fame, which includes notable alumni. Hinsdale Central Foundation Hall of Fame

- Momin Ahmed (2026), creator of Model UN Academy and youngest honoree on the 2026 Forbes 30 Under 30
- Tomi Adeyemi (2011), author
- Brian Allen (2014), NFL offensive lineman
- Jack Allen (2012), NFL offensive lineman
- Kiran Amegadjie (2020), NFL offensive lineman
- Peter S. Bridges (1953), diplomat and writer
- Matas Buzelis (attended Hinsdale Central, then transferred to Brewster Academy), Chicago Bulls player
- Danielle Campbell (2013), actress.
- Mary-Dell Chilton (1956), scientist and inventor, recipient of National Medal of Technology and Innovation
- Courtney Dolehide (2009), former professional tennis player.
- Kirk Dillard (1973), Illinois State Senator (1994–2014).
- Bob Dudley (1973), former CEO of BP.
- Bill Evans (1976), jazz saxophonist.
- Andrew Gutman (2015), professional soccer player for Celtic and FC Cincinnati in the MLS. Played college soccer for Indiana Hoosiers.
- Rebecca Haarlow (1997), sports journalist and sideline reporter.
- Thomas Ives (2014), NFL player for Chicago Bears
- John Kinsella (1970), swimmer, gold medalist at the 1972 Olympics, silver medalist at the 1968 Olympics, International Swimming Hall of Fame.
- Doug Kramer (2016), NFL offensive lineman
- Ricardo Lamas, professional Mixed Martial Artist in the UFC Featherweight Division.
- Parker Mack (2015), actor in Freeform drama Chasing Life, and in the MTV romantic comedy series, Faking It.
- Kelley Mack (2010), actress in season 9 of the series The Walking Dead (2018–2019). Also had roles in the films Profile (2018) and Broadcast Signal Intrusion (2021).
- Graham McIlvaine (2010), volleyball player on the United States men's national volleyball team.
- Meredith Monroe (1988), actress.
- Jay Freeman (1999), businessman and software engineer, creator of Cydia.
- John Murphy (1971), swimmer, gold and bronze medalist at the 1972 Summer Olympics.
- Lais Najjar (2021), 2024 Olympic gymnast (representing Syria).
- Joseph Nechvatal (1969), visual artist.
- Robert Nieman (1966), 1979 Modern pentathlon World Champion and 3-time Olympic athlete.
- Bert Piggott (1939), football player, coach, and university athletic director.
- Cathy Richardson (1986), actress, singer, songwriter.
- Marty Riessen (1960), professional tennis player, five–time member of the United States Davis Cup team, Wimbledon, U.S. Open, Australian Open and French Open doubles champion
- Rishi Shah (born 1986), businessman, founder of Outcome Health.
- Bill Veeck (attended Hinsdale Central, then transferred to Phillips Andover Academy), Major League Baseball team executive and owner, elected to the Baseball Hall of Fame in 1991.
- Brian Wardle (1997), head coach of the Bradley University men's basketball team since 2015, reached the 2019 NCAA tournament.
