= Destin Talbert =

American gridiron football player (born 1999)

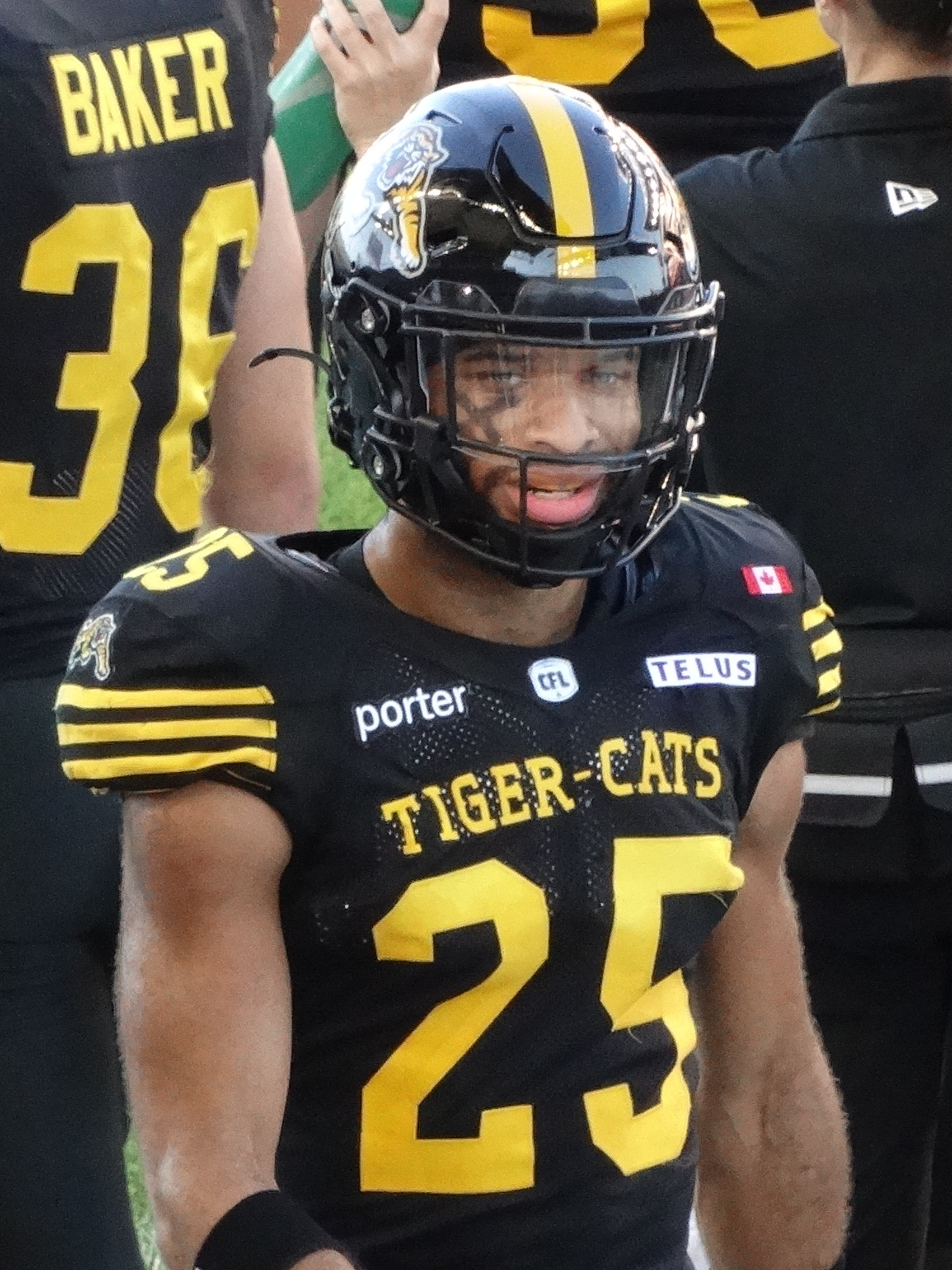
- Talbert with the Hamilton Tiger-Cats in 2025

No. 25 – Hamilton Tiger-Cats
- Position: Defensive back
- Roster status: Active
- CFL status: American

Personal information
- Born: October 25, 1999 (age 27); Darien, Illinois, U.S.
- Listed height: 6 ft 0 in (1.83 m)
- Listed weight: 187 lb (85 kg)

Career information
- High school: Hinsdale South (Darien)
- College: North Dakota State (2018–2022)
- NFL draft: 2023: undrafted

Career history
- 2023: Seattle Sea Dragons*
- 2024–present: Hamilton Tiger-Cats
- * Offseason or practice squad member only

Awards and highlights
- 3× FCS national champion (2018–2019, 2021)
- Stats at CFL.ca

Destin Talbert (born October 25, 1999) is an American professional football defensive back for the Hamilton Tiger-Cats of the Canadian Football League (CFL). He played college football at North Dakota State.

== Early life ==
Talbert played high school football at Hinsdale South High School in Darien, Illinois, as a wide receiver, defensive back, and kick returner. He set school records in single-game touchdowns, career touchdowns, single-game yards, and career yards.

== College career ==
Talbert played college football for the North Dakota State Bison from 2018 to 2022. He played in all 11 games his freshman year in 2018, and made five tackles. He appeared in all 16 games in 2019, recording 24 tackles and five pass breakups. Destin played in all 10 games, starting five, during the COVID-19 shortened 2020 season, totaling 25 tackles and five pass breakups. He appeared in all 15 games during the 2021 season, accumulating 31 tackles, five pass breakups, and three interceptions. He made a one-handed interception in the endzone in the final minutes of the 2021 NCAA semifinals, helping North Dakota State win 20-14 over James Madison. Talbert started all 15 games during his fifth season of college football in 2022, accumulating 59 tackles, one interception, six pass breakups, and one blocked field goal that he returned 56 yards for a touchdown.

== Professional career ==
Pre-draft measurables
Height	Weight	Arm length	Hand span	Wingspan	40-yard dash	10-yard split	20-yard split	20-yard shuttle	Three-cone drill	Vertical jump	Broad jump	Bench press
5 ft 11 1/2 in (1.82 m)	189 lb (86 kg)	30 3/4 in (0.78 m)	9 1/8 in (0.23 m)	6 ft 0 3/4 in (1.85 m)	4.59 s	1.58 s	2.65 s	4.37 s	6.94 s	40.0 in (1.02 m)	10 ft 3 in (3.12 m)	20 reps
All values from Pro Day

After the going undrafted in the 2023 NFL draft, Talbert was invited to rookie minicamp on a tryout basis with both the Chicago Bears and New Orleans Saints.

=== Seattle Sea Dragons ===
In June 2023, he was selected by the Seattle Sea Dragons during the 2023 XFL rookie draft. He signed with the team in October 2023. However, the Sea Dragons were not included in the merger of the XFL and USFL that formed the new United Football League.

=== Hamilton Tiger-Cats ===
Talbert signed with the Hamilton Tiger-Cats of the Canadian Football League (CFL) on January 22, 2024.
