= Cultural impact of the September 11 attacks =

Impact of 9/11 on society and culture

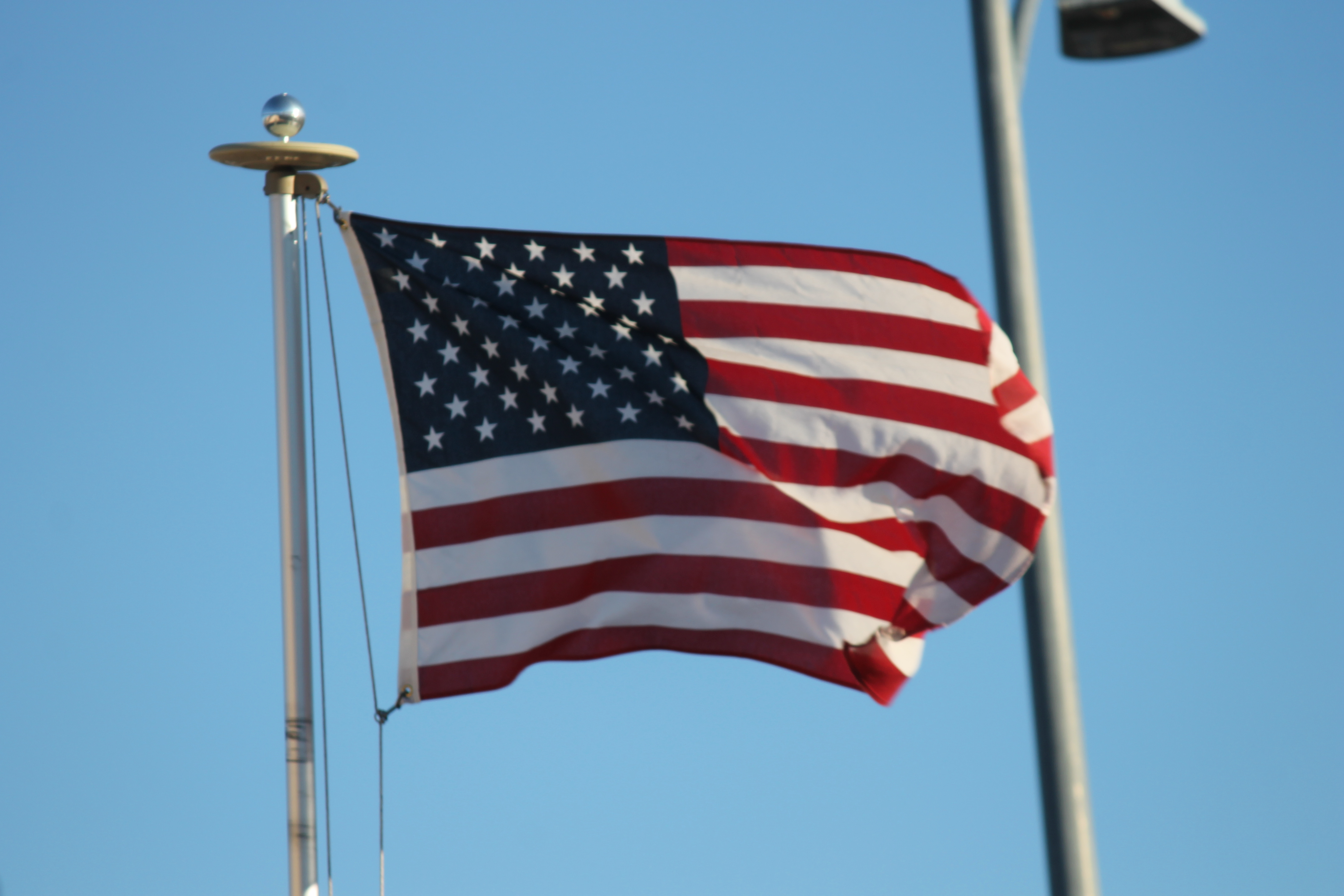
The aftermath of the September 11 attacks caused many Americans to embrace patriotism to extreme lengths.

The cultural impact of the September 11 attacks (9/11) was profound and extended well beyond geopolitics, spilling into society and culture in general. Many Americans began to identify a "pre-9/11" world and a "post-9/11" world as a way of viewing modern history. This created the feeling that the attacks put an end to the peacetime prosperity that dominated American life up to that point. Prominent social issues at the time, such as the public discourse in the wake of the Columbine High School massacre, became overshadowed by the attacks. Following 9/11, the attention of many Americans shifted from domestic issues towards terrorism abroad.

Immediate responses to 9/11 included greater focus on home life and time spent with family, higher church attendance, and increased expressions of patriotism such as the flying of American flags. The radio industry responded by removing certain songs from playlists, and the attacks have subsequently been used as background, narrative or thematic elements in film, television, music and literature.

Already-running television shows, as well as programs developed after 9/11, have reflected post-9/11 cultural concerns. 9/11 conspiracy theories have become social phenomena, despite lack of support from scientists, engineers, and historians. 9/11 has also had a major impact on the religious faith of many individuals; for some it strengthened, to find consolation to cope with the loss of loved ones and overcome their grief; others started to question their faith or lost it entirely, because they could not reconcile it with their view of religion.

The culture of the United States succeeding the attacks is noted for heightened security and an increased demand thereof, as well as paranoia and anxiety regarding future terrorist attacks that includes most of the nation. Psychologists have also confirmed that there has been an increased amount of national anxiety in commercial air travel.

Due to the significance of the attacks, media coverage was extensive (including disturbing pictures and live video) and prolonged discourse about the attacks in general, resulting in iconography and greater meaning associated with the event. Don DeLillo called it "the defining event of our time". The attacks spawned a number of catchphrases, terms, and slogans, many of which continue to be used more than a decade later.

One of the most well-known references and events of the 9/11 attacks is President George W. Bush's response to the situation while visiting students at Emma E. Booker Elementary in Sarasota, Florida. Chief of Staff Andy Card approached Bush and whispered in his ear, "A second plane has hit the second tower, America is under attack" while the president was addressing the children. Bush requested a moment of silence. He claimed he did not want to 'rattle the kids' and continued on with his visit for a few minutes before leaving to handle the attacks.

== Media response ==
Through numerous reproductions in mass media and popular culture, the attacks have an important cultural meaning for many people: "The attacks percolate as a central theme or historical backdrop in countless works of art, which bear witness to the complexity of 9/11 as historical, political, and media event, and contribute to the negotiation of its cultural meaning." Regarding the attacks of 9/11 and Pearl Harbor Arthur G. Neal said:

"We create the world through our perceptions of it and seek to maintain area with world in a manner consistent with our beliefs about it. It is through such symbolic constructions that we are provided with usable frameworks for shaping our memories and organizing them into coherent systems of meaning."

=== Depictions of the World Trade Center ===
After the September 11 attacks, some movies and television shows deleted scenes or episodes set within the World Trade Center. For example, The Simpsons episode "The City of New York vs. Homer Simpson", which first aired in 1997, was removed from syndication after the attacks because a large portion of the episode took place at and inside World Trade Center. Songs that mentioned the World Trade Center were no longer aired on radio, and the release dates of some films, such as the films Sidewalks of New York (2001), People I Know (2002), and Spider-Man (2002), were delayed so producers could remove scenes that included the World Trade Center. The film Kissing Jessica Stein (2001), which was shown at the Toronto International Film Festival the day before the attacks, had to be modified before its general public release so the filmmakers could delete scenes that depicted the World Trade Center.

Other episodes and films mentioned the attacks directly, or depicted the World Trade Center in alternate contexts. The production of some family-oriented films was also sped up due to a large demand for that genre following the attacks. Demand for horror and action films decreased, but within a short time demand returned to normal. By the first anniversary of the attacks, over sixty "memorial films" had been created. Filmmakers were criticized for removing scenes related to the World Trade Center. Rita Kempley of The Washington Post said "if we erase the towers from our art, we erase it [sic] from our memories". Author Donald Langmead compared the phenomenon to the novel Nineteen Eighty-Four (1949), where historic mentions of events are retroactively "rectified". Other filmmakers such as Michael Bay, who directed the film Armageddon (1998), opposed retroactively removing references to the World Trade Center based on post-9/11 attitudes.

Oliver Stone's film World Trade Center—the first movie that specifically examined the effects of the attacks on the World Trade Center, as contrasted with the effects elsewhere—was released in 2006. Several years after the attacks, works such as "The City of New York vs. Homer Simpson" were placed back in syndication. The National September 11 Museum has preserved many of the works that feature depictions of the original World Trade Center. Hip-Hop group The Coup’s fourth studio album, called Party Music, briefly stopped production after the attacks because it depicted them “blowing up” the Twin Towers. They would later change the cover art to a wine glass.

=== Influence on American superhero fiction ===
American comic books have always carried patriotic tones, especially during the Cold War—perhaps the most notable example is the character Captain America. 9/11 shifted the political climate and with it re-centered the public's attention on Muslims. Perhaps the most mainstream example of the influence 9/11 had on comic books is Iron Man, who was previously an anti-communist crusader; his canon was rewritten in comics after 9/11 and in the widely popular film Iron Man (2008). In the film, billionaire Tony Stark learns his weapons were sold without his knowledge to various terrorist groups after he was kidnapped and tortured in Afghanistan.

== Symbolism ==
The September 11 attacks gained an iconographic meaning. This was due to the fact that the Twin Towers of the World Trade Center in New York City were portrayed as symbolic buildings representing American financial power, and the Pentagon in Arlington County, Virginia was portrayed as a symbolic building representing American military power. Backed up by the media and literature, many people see 9/11 as an attack on the economic and military power of America. Furthermore, the attacks are often pictured as a symbol for an era of war and terrorism.

== Jargon inspired by 9/11 ==
Nine-eleven or 9/11
A term coming from the typical U.S. date notation and the date September 11. The practice of referring to ominous dates through this shorthand has continued, for example, with 7/7 for the 2005 London bombings and 1/6 or January 6 for the 2021 United States Capitol attack. Even in English-speaking countries which typically use a different date format to the U.S. "month/day/year", the event is still commonly referred to as "Nine-eleven". For example, "Nine-eleven" will tend to be used in everyday speech in the United Kingdom, despite how British people would otherwise write September 11 as "11/9".
Pre-9/11 and Post-9/11
Terms used to describe the period of time and the state of the world before and after the attack, regarding 9/11 as an epoch. They are often used to denote foreign policy and domestic security measures as they existed before or after the attacks.
Ground Zero
Ground zero is a generic term for the point on the Earth's surface closest to a detonation. Capitalized, it is shorthand for the World Trade Center site; used, for example, in "Ground Zero mosque", a pejorative for the Cordoba House or Park51 Islamic center.
The Bathtub
The excavated foundations of the World Trade Center. Although not a new term, it gained prominence during rescue, cleanup, and ongoing reconstruction efforts.
The Pile
The rubble of the collapsed World Trade Center.
Jumper
A jumper is someone who commits suicide by jumping from a height. It is unclear which of the "jumpers" seen falling from the WTC had jumped and which fell while trying to climb to safety. The medical examiner's office ruled homicide for all bodies, unable to distinguish jumpers from those who died inside the towers. "The Falling Man" is an iconic photograph of a jumper.
"Let's roll"
Reported to have been uttered by Flight 93 passenger Todd Beamer shortly before he and fellow passengers apparently rushed the cockpit.
FPCON Delta
The highest state of terrorist alert issued by the U.S. Armed Forces.

=== Media slogans ===
Various slogans and captions were employed by media outlets to brand coverage of the September 11 terrorist attack, its aftereffects, and the U.S. government's response. The slogans for American media were typically positioned on the bottom third of television broadcasts, or as banners across the top of newspaper pages. Designs typically incorporated a patriotic red, white, and blue motif, along with an explicit graphic of the American flag. Examples include:

- "America Attacked", "A Nation United" (ABC)
- "Attack on America" (NBC and CBS)
- "A Nation Challenged", "Day of Terror", "Portraits of Grief" (The New York Times)
- "America's New War", "War Against Terror", "America under Attack" (CNN)
- "War on Terror" (Fox News)
- "America on Alert", "America under Attack" (MSNBC)
- "The Second Pearl Harbor" (The Honolulu Advertiser)
- "War on America" (The Daily Telegraph)

=== U.S. government terms ===
- War on terrorism (also Global War on Terror) refers to the political response from the U.S. government to the attacks of 9/11 and includes the invasions of Afghanistan and Iraq; the color-coded national threat condition reporting system; the Patriot Act; and the prison camp in Guantánamo Bay, Cuba.
- Enduring Freedom – Name for the U.S.-led military response in Afghanistan, Philippines, Horn of Africa, and Trans Sahara.
- Infinite Justice – Original name for the U.S.-led military response, dropped after the religious overtones were pointed out by a reporter at a press briefing.

== See also ==
- Artwork damaged or destroyed in the September 11 attacks
- List of books about the September 11 attacks
- Discrimination and National Security Initiative
- List of cultural references to the September 11 attacks
- Impact of the September 11 attacks on entertainment
- Osama bin Laden (elephant)

== Bibliography ==
- Dixon, W.W. (2004). Film and Television After 9/11. Southern Illinois University Press. ISBN 978-0-8093-2556-6.
- Langmead, Donald (2009). Icons of American Architecture: From the Alamo to the World Trade Center. Greenwood icons. Greenwood. ISBN 978-0-313-34207-3.
