= Access Media 3 =

American Mass Media Company

Access Media 3 (“AM3”) is an Internet, television and telephone provider service company based in Oak Brook, Illinois. The company specializes in providing services to multi-dwelling units such as condominiums, apartments, retirement communities and student housing. At present, AM3 serves clients in Florida, Georgia, Illinois, Minnesota, Tennessee, Texas, North Carolina, Virginia, and Washington, DC. Currently, AM3 serves approximately 50,000 revenue generating units (RGUs) in over 450 properties. AM3 also conducts business as Upstream Network, in an effort to distance itself from the tarnished Access Media 3 branding.

== History ==
Access Media 3 was founded by CEO Scott Rediger in January 2007 in a merger with MDI Access. Rediger's previous experience in the telecom industry included his role as a co-founder of Ovation Communications, a competitive local exchange carrier business offering facility-based local, long distance, and data services to medium and large sized businesses in the metropolitan areas of Chicago, Minneapolis, St. Paul, Milwaukee and Detroit. After two years, Ovation Communications was sold to McLeod USA in 1999 for $402 million. After the sale, Rediger served as a Senior Vice President of Products and Development for McLeod USA.

AM3's business model specifically targeted multi-unit residential buildings as a market for customized bundled media services. The company works directly with property owners, associations and managers to design individualized packages of high-speed internet, voice and television from DIRECTV.

AM3 expanded rapidly through both organic sales growth and strategic acquisitions. Following its initial merger with MDI Access, AM3 acquired:

- Satellite television assets of Tunnel Vision Technology, Inc. in Chicago in September 2007
- inVision Networks in Burr Ridge, Illinois in May 2008
- SkyPix LLC of Bloomington, Minnesota in June 2008
- Avvid Technologies in Minneapolis/St. Paul in April 2010
- Cipher Ltd.|Cipher Ltd.’s MDU division in Chicago in April 2010
- onShore Networks LLC's|onShore Networks LLC's MDU division in Chicago in April 2010
- People's Choice Cable in Boca Raton, Florida in June 2011
- Limited assets of Shentel MTC in Georgia, Tennessee, Virginia and Washington D.C. in January 2012.

Financial backing for acquisitions came in part from investment support by private equity concerns Meritage Funds and WP Global Partners, as well as a credit facility relationship with JP Morgan Chase and financing support from Hinsdale Bank and Trust, a Wintrust Community Bank Charter. AM3 also expanded its sales staff to promote organic sales among property managers and owners. As a result, AM3s RGU base rose from approximately 3000 in 2007 to over 50,000 in 2011. In early 2012, AM3 secured $30 Million in funding from ORIX Venture Finance and Petra Capital Partners to fuel continued growth.

== Awards ==
AM3 and its leadership have received recognition for the company's swift growth, including:

- Inclusion in the 2011 Inc. 500 list of the fastest growing companies nationally
- Recognition of Scott Rediger in the Growth category of the 2011 Entrepreneurial Excellence Awards sponsored by the Daily Herald Business Ledger
- Receipt of the DIRECTV Highest Year-to-Year Growth Award in 2010
- Appointment of Scott Rediger to DIRECTV's MDU Board of Advisers in 2010
- Repeated inclusion in the DIRECTV Excel Club Award
