= Cass, Illinois =

Cass, Illinois may refer to:

- Cass County, Illinois
- Darien, Illinois, a Chicago incorporated Suburb formerly named Cass.
