= Valarie Kaur =

American filmmaker and activist (born 1981)

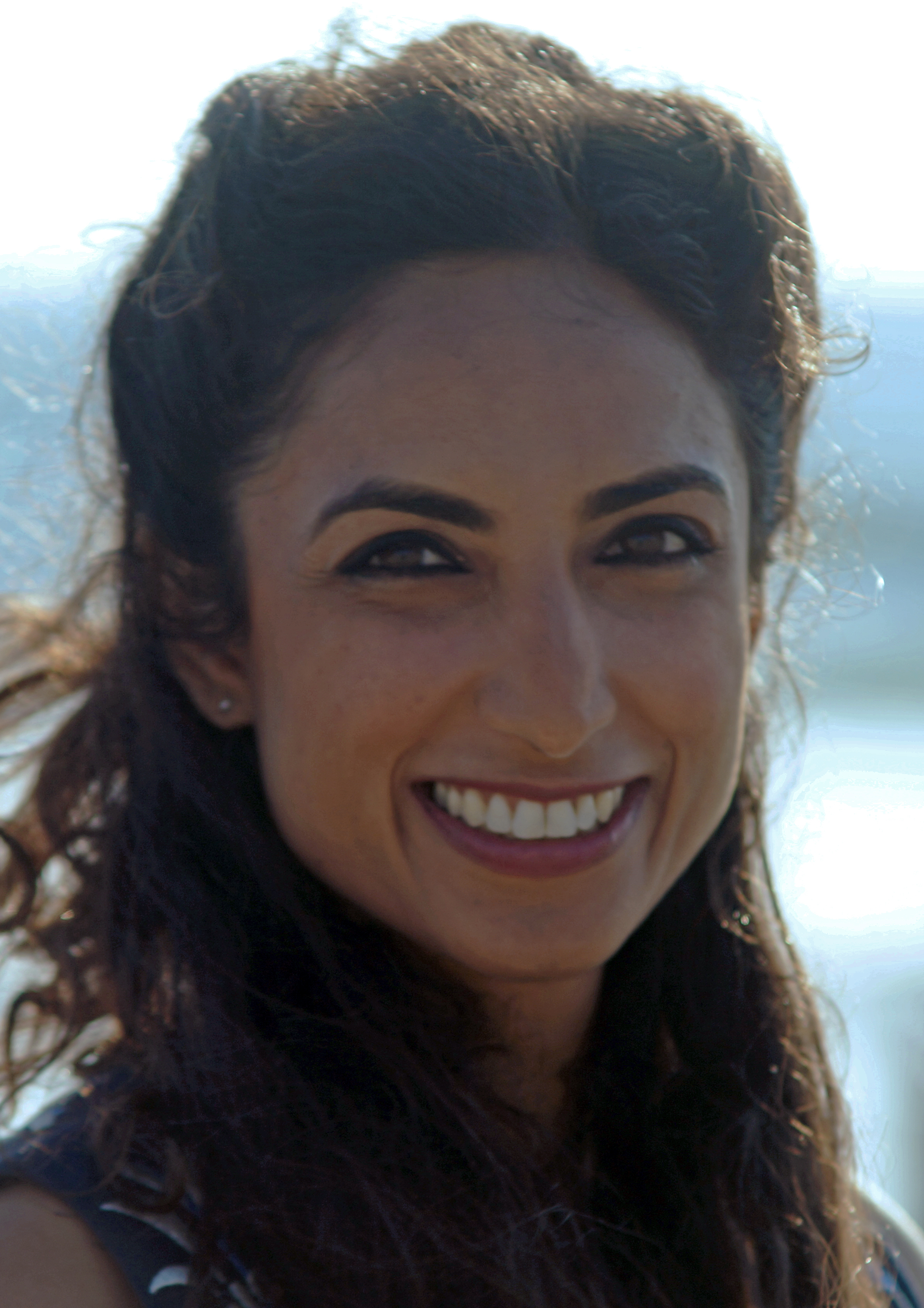
- Valarie Kaur, in 2016
- Born: February 14, 1981 (age 45); Clovis, California, U.S.
- Education: Stanford University (BA); Harvard Divinity School (MA); Yale Law School (JD)
- Occupations: Documentary filmmaker, activist
- Spouse: Sharat Raju
- Website: valariekaur.com

Valarie Kaur (born February 14, 1981) is an American activist, documentary filmmaker, lawyer, educator, and faith leader. She is the founder of the Revolutionary Love Project. Kaur's debut book, See No Stranger: A Memoir and Manifesto of Revolutionary Love, was published in June 2020. The book expands upon Kaur's TED Talk.

== Early life and education ==
She was born and raised in an Indian-American Sikh family in Clovis, California, where her family had settled as farmers in 1913.

Kaur earned a Bachelor of Arts degree in Religious Studies and International Relations from Stanford University, a Master of Arts in Theological Studies from Harvard Divinity School, and a Juris Doctor from Yale Law School. She is a member of the California Bar.

== Career ==
When a family friend, Balbir Singh Sodhi, was the first person killed in a hate crime after September 11, 2001, Kaur began to document hate crimes against Sikh and Muslim Americans, which resulted in the award-winning documentary film Divided We Fall: Americans in the Aftermath. Since then, she has made films and led story-based campaigns on hate crimes, racial profiling, immigration detention, solitary confinement, marriage equality, and Internet freedom. She is the founder of Groundswell Movement, considered "America's largest multifaith online organizing network", recognized for "dynamically strengthening faith-based organizing in the 21st century." She is also co-founder of Faithful Internet which organizes people of faith to protect net neutrality. She is the founder and director of the Revolutionary Love Project, a non-profit that produces tools, curricula and mass mobilizations aimed at reclaiming love as a force for justice.

Kaur's film making and activism have focused on gun violence prevention, racial profiling, immigration detention and prison practices, and Internet neutrality. Her activism has also included education work to combat hate crimes against Muslim and Sikh Americans. She founded the Yale Visual Law Project to inspire and equip new generations of advocates.

Kaur served as the Media and Justice Fellow at Stanford Law School's Center for Internet and Society and Senior Fellow at Auburn Theological Seminary. Kaur has given speeches at the White House, The Pentagon, and the Parliament of the World's Religions.

Kaur has frequently collaborated with her husband and creative partner, Sharat Raju. Together the two have produced several documentary films, including Stigma (2011) about the impact of New York City police's Stop and Frisk policy, Alienation (2011) about immigration raids, The Worst of the Worst: Portrait of a Supermax (2012) about solitary confinement in prison, and Oak Creek: In Memorium (2012) about the Wisconsin Sikh temple shooting.

Shortly after the 2016 U.S. presidential election, Kaur delivered a Watch Night address that went viral with over 30 million views worldwide. In 2017, she delivered a TED Talk entitled "3 Lessons of Revolutionary Love in a Time of Rage."

== Books ==
In June 2020 Kaur's debut book, See No Stranger: A Memoir and Manifesto of Revolutionary Love was published by One World (an imprint of Penguin Random House). The book expands upon Kaur's TED Talk. Kaur published Sage Warrior: Wake to Oneness, Practice Pleasure, Choose Courage, Become Victory (with Oneworld Publications) in 2024.

== Recognition ==
The Center for American Progress named Kaur "a standout figure in the world of interfaith organizing and activism." In 2012, she received the American Courage Award by Asian Americans Advancing Justice. In 2013, she was named a "Person of the Year" by India Abroad and one of eight Asian American "Women of Influence" by Audrey Magazine. In 2015, Kaur was recognized as a "Young Global Leader" by the World Economic Forum. In 2016, Harvard Divinity School awarded her the Peter J. Gomes Memorial Honor.

=== Awards ===
ReelWorld Film Festival

- Won: Outstanding International Documentary (2007) - Divided We Fall: Americans in the Aftermath

Indian Film Festival of Los Angeles

- Won: Audience Choice: Best Documentary (2007) - Divided We Fall: Americans in the Aftermath

Asian Americans Advancing Justice

- Won: American Courage Award (2012)

India Abroad

- Named: Person of the Year (2013)

Audrey Magazine

- Named: One of eight Asian American "Women of Influence"(2013)

World Economic Forum

- Named: A "Young Global Leader"(2015)

Harvard Divinity School

- Won: Peter J. Gomes Memorial Honor(2016)

Meadville Lombard Theological School

- Named: Honorary Doctor of Divinity(2022)

== See also ==
- Discrimination and National Security Initiative
