= Waterfall Glen Forest Preserve =

Forest preserve in Illinois, U.S.

Coordinates: 41°43′30″N 87°58′25″W

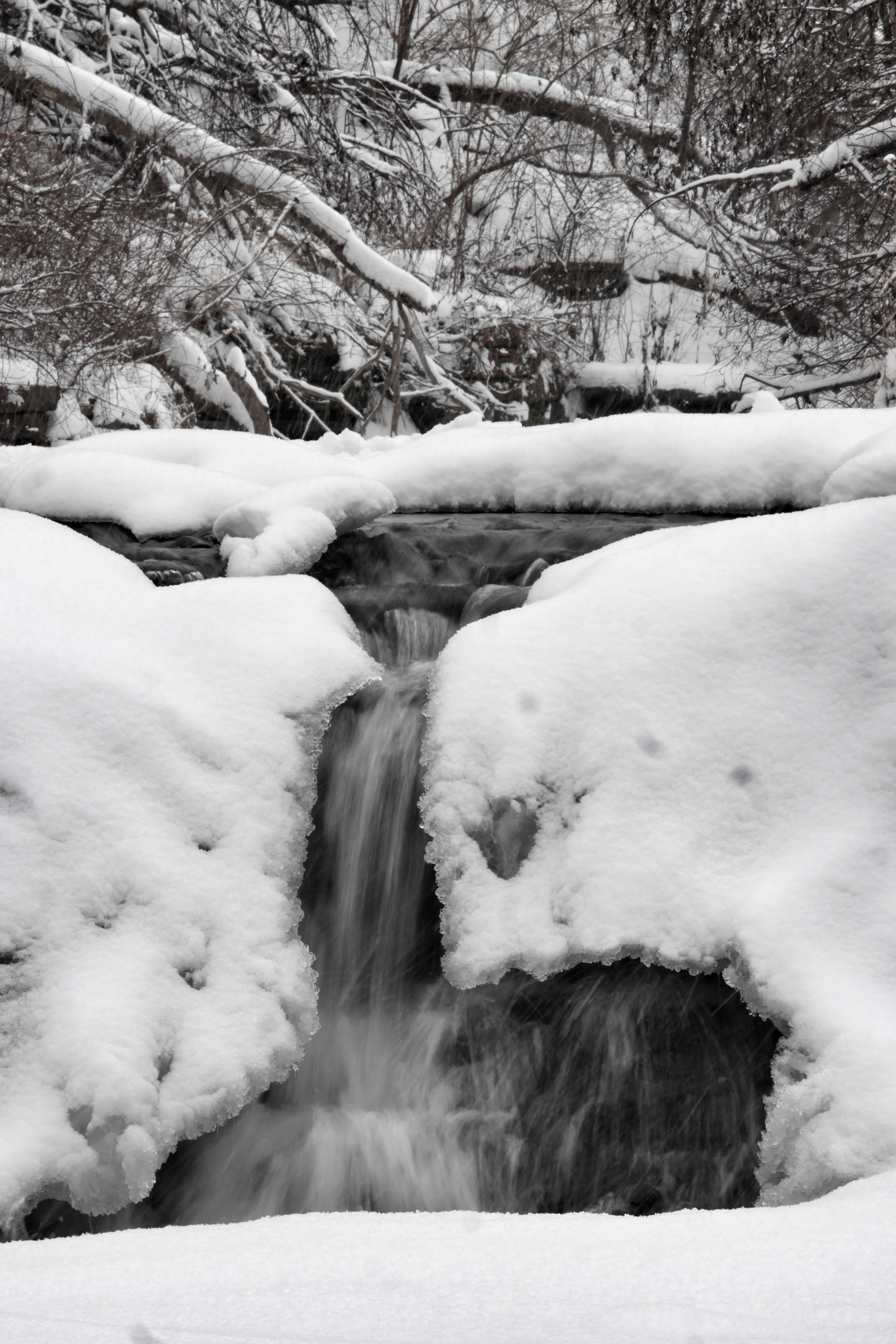
Sawmill Creek Waterfall, Waterfall Glen Forest Preserve, Lemont, Illinois

Waterfall Glen is a forest preserve in Downers Grove Township, DuPage County, Illinois, between the towns of Darien and Lemont, covering 2,492 acres (1,008 ha). It contains several waterfalls on Sawmill Creek as it empties into the Des Plaines River. Rocky Glen Falls, the largest waterfall in the preserve, is actually a natural dam in the valley glen. In the 1930s, the Civilian Conservation Corps helped restore the waterfall to its naturally tiered state, after years of erosion due to runoff from a nearby mill. It completely surrounds Argonne National Laboratory. It is also home to a popular model airplane field, located in the southwest section of the forest preserve. Hikers can also make the interior trip to St. Patrick Cemetery nestled deep in the preserve. Waterfall Glen's tallgrass prairies, bogs, and Midwestern oak savannas contain 740 native plant species, 75 percent of all the plants known to grow naturally in DuPage County. Over 300 species of mammals, birds, fish, amphibians, and reptiles and another 300 species of invertebrates use the forest preserve, either year-round or during their migrations.

== Natural history ==
Waterfall Glen's 773-acre "Bluff Savanna", which roughly covers the southern part of the preserve between Argonne National Laboratory and the Des Plaines River, is a natural Midwestern oak savanna. Waterfall Glen is one of highest ranked conservation areas in the county; it contains 422 native plant species, including one state threatened and 36 of special concern. Tall grass, ferns, and wild lilac bushes are common shrubbery found growing on the savanna. Many native insects, including giant grasshoppers and black window spiders, are known to nest in these shrubs. Individual black and white oaks, shagbark and bitternut hickories, and black walnuts range from 180 to 215 years old. With Waterfall Glen being a wooded area having older trees, birds like pileated woodpeckers, scarlet tanagers, ovenbirds, wood thrushes, broad-winged hawks, and barred owls, are attracted to the area and some species breed there. Ephemeral ponds make the savanna an essential habitat for amphibians such as salamanders, frogs and snakes. Sawmill Creek, which runs through the savanna, hosts a large crayfish population during the spring season. Larger fish and crustaceans can be found further downstream, closer to the Des Plaines River. Herds of deer, wolves, and coyotes roam freely and can be seen on the savanna during the warmer months.

== History ==
Long before Jacques Marquette and Louis Joliet paddled through the area, American Indians were living along the surrounding limestone bluffs, including today's Signal Hill, which served as a communications vantage point. By the late 1800s, the Ward Brothers’ mill was turning out lumber on Sawmill Creek, and Edwin Walker's three quarries were yielding tons of quality limestone for projects like the landmark Chicago Avenue Water Tower and Pumping Station. In 1925, the Forest Preserve District purchased its first 75 acres at Waterfall Glen, the Signal Hill and Rocky Glen areas. Rocky Glen soon became the site of the preserve's well-known tiered falls, which the Civilian Conservation Corps reconstructed in the 1930s near the original mill site. In 1973, the forest preserve added over 2,200 acres of surplus land from the U.S. Bureau of Outdoor Recreation, at which time it was given its current name. The name is not from the waterfall at the site, but rather Seymour “Bud” Waterfall, an early president of the District’s Board of Commissioners.

== Trails ==
The main trail is 9.5 miles long, 10 feet wide and made of crushed limestone. Hikers, bicyclists, horseback riders and cross-country skiers can enjoy some of Waterfall Glen's scenic areas via four mapped trails, which contain almost 11 miles of limestone- and turf-covered routes. Visitors on foot can explore the narrow, unmarked footpaths that crisscross through Waterfall Glen, but these paths are not marked and may not meet with the marked paths.
