= Darien Sportsplex Ice Arena =

- Interactive map of Darien Sportsplex Ice Arena
- Location: Darien, Illinois, United States
- Coordinates: 41.75357°N 87.95817°W
- Owner: Darien Park District
- Capacity: 1,250 (ice hockey)
- Surface: Ice

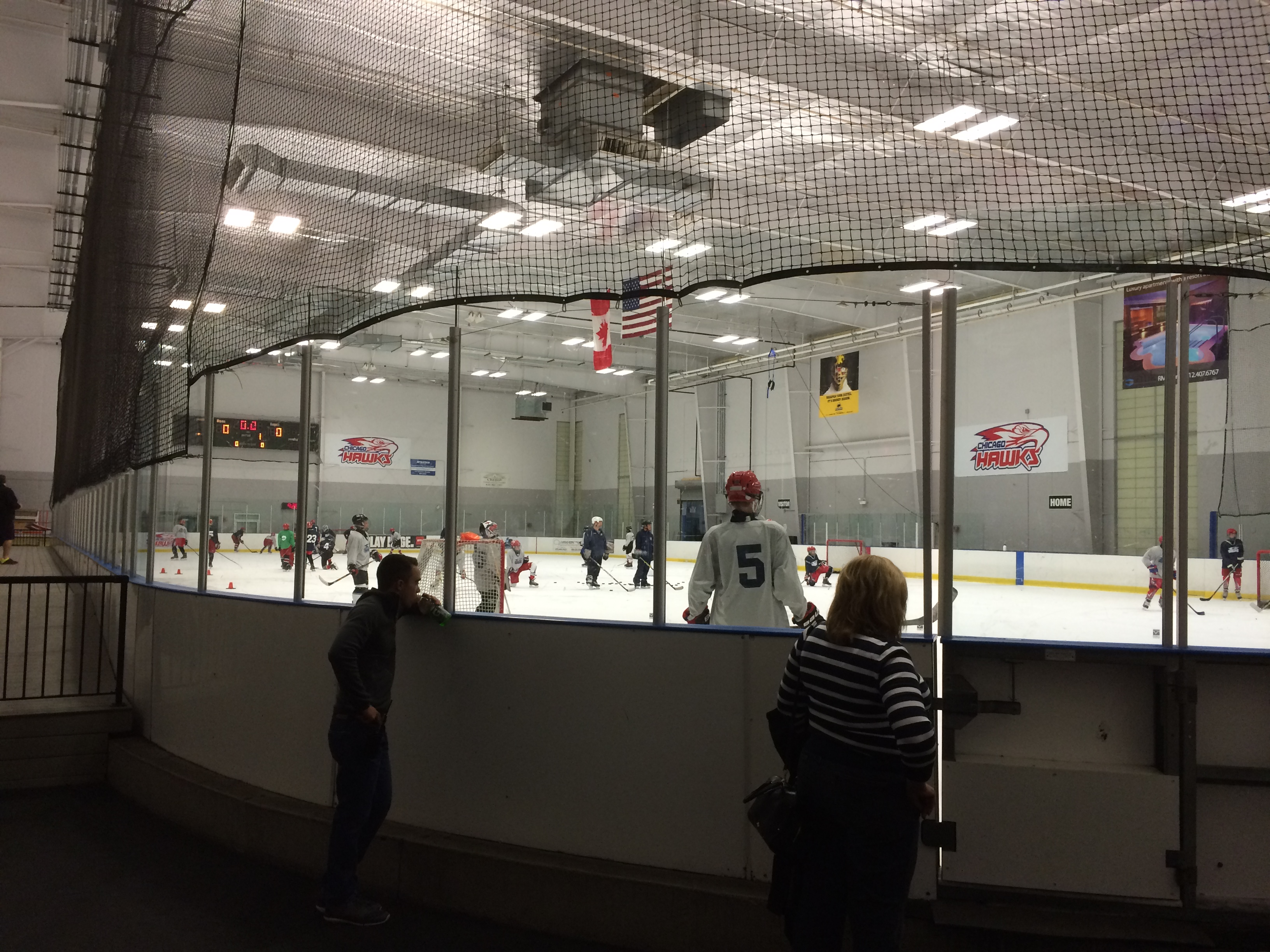

Darien Sportsplex Ice Arena is an arena and recreational sport facility in Darien, Illinois, United States. It features three NHL size sheets of ice for hockey, figure skating, and open skating. The facility also has a full-size indoor field house, a meeting room, an ice hockey Pro Shop, a concession stand, and a hockey training center. Current seating capacity for ice hockey games is 1,250.

The arena has many programs that accommodate all ages. The Spring Hockey League is for kids in high school. Little Hawks Camp offers many activities. In Learn to Skate, a child and or adult of any age is taught how to skate for the purpose of playing hockey in the future. Learn to Play is an offshoot of Learn to Skate. This is for children four to ten years old who are taught by teachers who have a background in hockey, to teach the natural progression of the game itself. Drills for Skills is for kids 14 years and younger, who are trained to maintain and develop the technical aspects of playing hockey. The In-House Leagues is for players who are ready for team play, have gone through a tryout, and have been chosen as part of a team. The 3ON3 League offers a faster pace of hockey, designed to give players the opportunity to play with the puck more and develop self-control on the ice.

The Sportsplex's figure skating program includes Skate School, which is designed to help kid and adult who are interested in learning how to skate, whether for fun or competitively. Tryouts determine participants' placement and instructors.

Soccer activities at the Sportsplex include the Eclipse Select Super Rec League. This includes kids in preschool through eighth grade, who are placed on teams. Kids of different ages play one another and develop soccer skills on practice days. The LDL Skills School (Live it, Dream it, Love it) is designed for players to gain technique and confidence in the game of soccer. The facility also offers adult soccer leagues.

The arena has open public skating, which allows anyone who wishes to free skate on certain days. There is a resident fee and a non-resident fee.

Rat Hockey allows participants who are eighteen years or older to form a team and play on specific days.

SEASPAR is also held in the meeting room.

The three ice arenas, meeting room, and field house are all available for rental. Pricing is dependent on the length of time of the rental.

The arena is home to the Chicago Hawks Hockey Club, Darien Figure Skating School, Darien Youth Club, and the Illinois High School Hockey League.
