= Hinsdale South High School =

Location
- 7401 Clarendon Hills Road; Darien, Illinois 60527; United States; 41.7537°N 87.9525°W

Information
- School type: public secondary
- Opened: 1965
- Status: Open
- School district: Hinsdale Township High School District 86
- Principal: Kari Peronto
- Faculty: 108.67 (FTE)
- Grades: 9–12
- Gender: Co-Education
- Enrollment: 1,329 (2023-2024)
- Average class size: 19.4
- Student to teacher ratio: 12.23
- Campus: suburban
- Colours: black Gold
- Athletics conference: West Suburban Conference
- Nickname: Hornets
- Publication: Phoenix
- Newspaper: Stinger
- Yearbook: Vespa
- Radio station: WHSD 88.5 FM
- Website: south.hinsdale86.org

Hinsdale South High School, or HSHS, and locally referred to as "South," is a public four-year high school located at the corner of 75th Street and Clarendon Hills Road in Darien, Illinois, a southwestern suburb of Chicago, Illinois, in the United States. The South campus draws its students from the nearby communities of Darien (east of Cass Ave.), and portions of Burr Ridge, Willowbrook, and Westmont. It is part of Hinsdale Township High School District 86, which also includes Hinsdale Central High School. Hinsdale South is home to the LaGrange Area Department of Special Education (LADSE) Deaf and Hard of Hearing program.

== History ==
In 1962, a referendum for a second high school was passed, and Hinsdale South opened its doors in the fall of 1965 to 418 freshmen and sophomores. A new wing of school, solely designated for the Science department, was opened to students at the beginning of the 2003–2004 school year. The wing includes eight new classrooms, preparatory rooms, a new science department office, and a greenhouse. The school's library contains four computer areas/laboratories.

== Academics ==
Hinsdales South's class of 2008 had an average composite ACT score of 22.4, 1.9 points above the state average. 98.8% of the senior class graduated. Hinsdale South made Adequate Yearly Progress (AYP) on the Prairie State Achievement Examination, which with the ACT comprises the state assessments used to fulfill the federal No Child Left Behind Act. The school is currently listed as requiring "corrective action" under the federal mandate, and on the first year of academic watch by the state.

According to Newsweek's 2010 "Complete List of 1,600 Top High Schools" (which uses the Challenge Index to rank schools), Hinsdale South ranked #495, making it the 10th best high school in Illinois. This was the sixth year in a row South had made the list, previously being ranked #1506 (2009), #543 (2008), #591 (2007), #711 (2006), and #627 (2005).

The deaf/hard of hearing program provides students in the DuPage West Cook Regional Program educational/support services. Included in these services are: interpreters, social work services, tutorial, program assistants, speech and language services, behavior supports, a vocational support team, self-supporting classes taught by teachers in the deaf and hard of hearing program, and guidance counselors who specialize in this program.

== Demographics ==
In the 2022-2023 school year, there were 1,371 students at the school. 54% of students identified as non-Hispanic white, 17% were black or African-American, 16% were Hispanic, 9% were Asian or Asian-American, and 4% were multiracial. 19% of students were eligible for free or reduced price lunch. The school has a student to teacher ratio of 12.8.

== Technology in the classroom ==
The school currently provides all teachers with Tablet PCs, and the school is fully equipped with wireless internet technologies. Tablet PC carts and stations are also available to students. Also, students at Hinsdale South are allowed the option of bringing a computer laptop or personal digital assistant for note taking and word processing. Carts with 20+ laptops each are available for check-out to teachers to provide to their students for use during class time. As of 2004, the school has four large computer labs located in its library. As of the 2018–19 school year, the school supplies every student with a Chromebook (generally from the brand Lenovo) for educational purposes both inside and out of the classroom.

== Athletics ==
Hinsdale South is a member of the West Suburban Conference. The school is a member of the Illinois High School Association (IHSA) which governs most sports and competitive activities in the state. The team representing the school are stylized as the Hornets.

The school sponsors interscholastic teams for young men and women in: basketball, bowling, cross country, golf, gymnastics, soccer, swimming & diving, tennis, track & field, volleyball, and water polo. Young men may compete in baseball, football, and wrestling, while women may compete in badminton, cheerleading, danceline and softball. While not sponsored by the IHSA, the Athletic Department also sponsors a dance team for young women. The school also sponsors entries in the Special Olympics.

The following teams won their respective IHSA sponsored state championship tournament or meet:

- Badminton: State Champions (1998—1999, 2004–2005, 2005–2006) (All co-championships)
- Baseball: State Champions (1981—82)

Hinsdale South engages in two rivalries in football. The annual game against district rival Hinsdale Central is for the Doings Cup. The winner of the annual game with Downers Grove South High School is awarded the Rebel Cannon trophy.

There are seven gyms, including a multipurpose gym used for Physical Education, assemblies, and volleyball and basketball games. There is also a pool, wrestling gym, gymnastics gym, field house, a fitness center/gym, and a general use gym. Outdoor facilities include a new track, a stadium, four baseball/softball diamonds, soccer fields and nine tennis courts.

== Notable alumni ==
- Barbara Alyn Woods (class of 1980) is an actress best known for her work on television playing the character Deb Scott on the series One Tree Hill.
- Kenny Beecham (class of 2015) is a YouTuber, basketball analyst, and podcaster. He co-founded Enjoy Basketball, a sports media brand.
- Janai Brugger (class of 2001) is an opera singer. She won the 2026 Grammy for Best Opera Recording.
- Geoffrey Cain (class of 2004) is a journalist and author specializing in geopolitics and technology.
- Kevin Kasper (class of 1996) was an NFL wide receiver (2001—09). He was a member of the Super Bowl XXXIX Champion New England Patriots.
- Manu Raju (class of 1998) is a senior congressional correspondent for CNN covering Capitol Hill and campaign politics. He frequently guests on CNN TV and radio shows.
- Destin Talbert (class of 2018) is an American professional football defensive back for the Hamilton Tiger-Cats of the Canadian Football League (CFL).
- Jason Van Dyke (class of 1996) is a former police officer and convicted murderer.
- Matt Walsh (class of 1982) is an actor, comedian, director, and writer.
- Sarah Warren (class of 2014) is a speed skater that represented the United States at the 2026 Winter Olympics
