= Gopalakrishna Adiga =

Kannada poet

- Born: 1918; Mogeri, South Canara, Madras Presidency, British India (present-day Kundapura taluk, Udupi district, Karnataka, India)
- Died: 1992 (aged 73–74); Bangalore, Karnataka
- Occupations: Poet, writer, professor
- Relatives: Manu Raju (grandson); Sharat Raju (grandson)
- Writing career
- Genre: Fiction
- Movement: Navya

Mogeri Gopalakrishna Adiga (18.2.1918–14.11.1992) was a modern Kannada poet. He is known by some commentators as the "pioneer of New style" poetry.

== Biography ==
He was born in the coastal village of Mogeri, Udupi district, in Karnataka State. After primary education in Mogeri and Baindooru, he went to high school in Kundapur. As editor of Saakshi magazine he helped bring Kannada literature to the masses.

Adiga's grandson is Manu Raju, Senior Political reporter for CNN. Another grandson, Sharat Raju, is a film director in the US.

== Work ==
In the 1950s and 1960s Adiga was a teacher in Mysore. From 1964 until 1968 he was the principal of Lal Bahadur College in Sagara, and from 1968 until 1971 he was Principal of Poorna Prajna College in Udupi.

His style has been described as a response to the independence of India from British rule in 1947. The style called Navya was generally about the new times. Inspired by modern Western literature and Indian tradition, he set out to portray the "disillusionment and angst of the times".

== Works ==
- Bhavataranga - 1946
- Anathey - 1954 (novel)
- Bhoomi Geetha - 1959
- Mannina Vasane (book of essays) - 1966
- Vardhamana - 1972
- Idanna Bayasiralilla (poems) - 1975
- Samagra Kavya (collection of poems) - 1976
- Sakshi (Magazine) - 1962

== Quotes ==
- "ಇರುವುದೆಲ್ಲವ ಬಿಟ್ಟು ಇರದುದರೆಡೆಗೆ ತುಡಿವುದೆ ಜೀವನ?" (Iruvudellava bittu iradudaredege tudivude jeevana?)

Is life leaving everything we have and craving for things which we do not have?

- "ಮೌನ ತಬ್ಬಿತು ನೆಲವ" (mouna tabbitu nelava)

== See also ==
- Kannada language
- Kannada literature
- Kannada poetry
- Gopalakrishna Bharathi
