= Hinsdale Township High School District 86 =

High school district in Hinsdale, Illinois

Address
- 5500 South Grant Street Hinsdale, Illinois, 60521; United States

District information
- Type: Public
- Grades: 9–12
- NCES District ID: 1719320

Students and staff
- Students: 3,976

Other information
- Website: www.hinsdale86.org

Hinsdale Township High School District 86 is a high school district headquartered in Hinsdale, Illinois.

Its boundary includes the DuPage County portions of Burr Ridge and Hinsdale, all of Willowbrook, most of Clarendon Hills, Darien, and Oak Brook, and parts of Westmont.

It operates Hinsdale Central High School and Hinsdale South High School.

Hinsdale Township High School District 86 has more than 4000 students in grades 9 through 12. The student-to-teacher ratio is currently 14:1, whereas the national average is 17:1. The first class to graduate from Hinsdale High School was in 1883. District 86 was formed when the elementary school and high school were split into separate districts. Originally, there was only Hinsdale High school (located in Hinsdale and later known as Hinsdale Township High School), but a 1962 referendum provided for a 2nd school: Hinsdale South High School (located in Darien, Illinois).

== Academics ==
District 86 has a graduation rate of 91%. The number of students who miss more than 10% of school days is only 14%. As of 2018, the average SAT testing scores for math are 590.3 and for English Language Arts are 584.1. In 2017, the average spending per student for operational purposes was $20,397 and for instructional purposes was $12,849. More than 90% of teachers return to work for the school district each year.

== 2019 referendum ==
Hinsdale High School District 86 proposed to cut activities such as football, wrestling, swimming, cheerleading, and marching band in order to save money. However, voters approved a $140 million bond referendum. which meant these measures would not be needed. The referendum called for an increase in property tax; a house worth $500,000 should expect to pay roughly $283 more in annual property taxes.

== Notable alumni ==
=== Hinsdale Central High School ===
- Brian Torff (1972), bassist, teacher, and composer

== Enrollment and equity issues ==
There have been criticisms of educational equity in the district. The 2021 school district report card showed that Hinsdale Central has nearly twice the enrollment of students as Hinsdale South, causing a disparity of course offerings. However, proposed revisions of the attendance boundaries have not been palatable solutions for some district residents.
