= Burr Ridge, Illinois =

- Village
- Village of Burr Ridge
- Flag Logo
- Motto: "A Very Special Place"
- Location of Burr Ridge in DuPage County, Illinois.
- Coordinates: 41°45′21″N 87°55′06″W
- Country: United States
- State: Illinois
- Counties: DuPage, Cook
- Townships: Downers Grove, Lyons
- Incorporated: 1956

Government
  - Type: Council–manager

Area
  - Total: 7.33 sq mi (18.99 km^{2})
  - Land: 7.20 sq mi (18.64 km^{2})
  - Water: 0.14 sq mi (0.35 km^{2})
- Elevation: 705 ft (215 m)

Population (2020)
  - Total: 11,192
  - Density: 1,554.8/sq mi (600.32/km^{2})

Standard of living (2007-11)
  - Per capita income: $81,192
  - Home value: $679,400
- Time zone: UTC-6 (CST)
  - Summer (DST): UTC-5 (CDT)
- ZIP code(s): 60527
- Area code(s): 630 and 331
- Geocode: 17-09980
- FIPS code: 17-09980
- GNIS feature ID: 2397506
- Website: www.burr-ridge.gov

Burr Ridge (formerly Harvester) is a village in Cook and DuPage counties in the U.S. state of Illinois. Per the 2020 census, the population was 11,192.

== History ==
Burr Ridge's gently rolling hills were carved by glaciers at the end of the last ice age, and most of the village lies on the Valparaiso Moraine. Flagg Creek, a tributary of the Des Plaines River, runs through town.

Joseph Vial erected a log cabin near Wolf and Plainfield roads in 1834. Vial also ran a hotel on the stagecoach line, and the Vial family was actively involved in Lyons Township politics and the creation of the Lyonsville congregational church. The first Democratic convention in Cook County was held in Burr Ridge in 1835. After 1848, farmers shipped their goods to Chicago along the Illinois and Michigan Canal. A small settlement of German farmers also inhabited Flagg Creek by the 1880s.

In 1917, the International Harvester Company purchased 414 acres (1.7 km^{2}) for an experimental farm, where it tested the world's first all-purpose tractor, the Farmall. Also in 1917, the Cook County Prison Farm (also known as the Bridewell Farm) began operation in what is now Burr Ridge.

In 1947, developer Robert Bartlett, whose company also developed Beverly Shores and Countryside, established the Hinsdale Countryside Estates out of a former pig farm. In 1956 these residents decided to incorporate as the village of Harvester, in honor of International Harvester.

In the 1940s, Denver Busby bought 190 acres (0.8 km^{2}) that became known as the Burr Ridge dairy farm. He later launched the Burr Ridge Estates, with 5-acre (20,000 m^{2}) home sites. In 1961, International Harvester and the Burr Ridges Estates merged with Harvester, changing the community's name to Burr Ridge. The town name is derived from a group of bur oak. By 1963, the population had more than doubled, to 790, and by 1975 it had soared to over 2,200.

In 1969, Chicago mayor Richard J. Daley suggested a proposal to build low-income subsidized housing on the prison farm property, but Republican-dominated DuPage County quashed the idea. The prison farm site became the Ambriance subdivision, a gated community of multimillion-dollar homes. The Four Pines Farm gave way to the Carriage Way subdivision, at whose entrance the original farmhouse still stands, and in 1971 additional farmland became the Braemoor neighborhood. An area known as Valley View, once owned by a Chicago industrialist and later by the Chicago chapter of the Boy Scouts of America, was developed in the early 1970s as the Burr Ridge Club. The village also has five corporate parks. As with other towns in the industrial corridor southwest of Chicago, close proximity to Interstates 294 and 55 spurred development in Burr Ridge.

== Geography ==
According to the 2021 census gazetteer files, Burr Ridge has a total area of 7.29 square miles (18.88 km^{2}), of which 7.16 square miles (18.54 km^{2}) (or 98.15%) is land and 0.14 square miles (0.36 km^{2}) (or 1.85%) is water.

Burr Ridge lies in both Du Page and Cook counties. The village is bordered by Hinsdale to the north, Western Springs to the northeast, Indian Head Park to the east, Willow Springs to the south and southeast, and Willowbrook to the west, along with several unincorporated areas.

== Demographics ==
Historical population
Census	Pop.	Note	%±
1960	299		—
1970	1,637		447.5%
1980	3,838		134.5%
1990	7,669		99.8%
2000	10,408		35.7%
2010	10,559		1.5%
2020	11,192		6.0%
U.S. Decennial Census; 2010 2020

=== Racial and ethnic composition ===
Burr Ridge village, Illinois – Racial and ethnic composition Note: the US Census treats Hispanic/Latino as an ethnic category. This table excludes Latinos from the racial categories and assigns them to a separate category. Hispanics/Latinos may be of any race.
Race / Ethnicity (NH = Non-Hispanic)	Pop 2000	Pop 2010	Pop 2020	% 2000	% 2010	% 2020
White alone (NH)	8,698	8,167	8,212	83.57%	77.35%	73.37%
Black or African American alone (NH)	102	207	208	0.98%	1.96%	1.86%
Native American or Alaska Native alone (NH)	1	4	5	0.01%	0.04%	0.04%
Asian alone (NH)	1,136	1,563	1,834	10.91%	14.80%	16.39%
Pacific Islander alone (NH)	3	0	0	0.03%	0.00%	0.00%
Other race alone (NH)	8	21	27	0.08%	0.20%	0.24%
Mixed race or Multiracial (NH)	156	167	297	1.50%	1.58%	2.65%
Hispanic or Latino (any race)	304	430	609	2.92%	4.07%	5.44%
Total	10,408	10,559	11,192	100.00%	100.00%	100.00%

=== 2020 census ===
As of the 2020 census, Burr Ridge had a population of 11,192. There were 3,194 families residing in the village. The median age was 53.3 years. 17.8% of residents were under the age of 18 and 31.3% of residents were 65 years of age or older. For every 100 females there were 96.0 males, and for every 100 females age 18 and over there were 93.4 males age 18 and over.

100.0% of residents lived in urban areas, while 0.0% lived in rural areas.

There were 4,195 households in Burr Ridge, of which 25.5% had children under the age of 18 living in them. Of all households, 68.2% were married-couple households, 10.7% were households with a male householder and no spouse or partner present, and 18.4% were households with a female householder and no spouse or partner present. About 19.6% of all households were made up of individuals and 13.0% had someone living alone who was 65 years of age or older.

The population density was 1,534.83 inhabitants per square mile (592.60/km^{2}). There were 4,562 housing units at an average density of 625.62 per square mile (241.55/km^{2}), of which 8.0% were vacant. The homeowner vacancy rate was 2.3% and the rental vacancy rate was 22.0%.

=== Income and poverty ===
The median income for a household in the village was $151,900, and the median income for a family was $204,167. Males had a median income of $115,272 versus $63,266 for females. The per capita income for the village was $97,295. About 1.1% of families and 3.3% of the population were below the poverty line, including 1.6% of those under age 18 and 2.8% of those age 65 or over.

== Notable people ==
- Dennis DeYoung, former lead singer of the band Styx
- Jennifer Hudson, singer and actress
- Bo Jackson, former professional athlete in both baseball and football
- David Otunga, former WWE wrestler
- Jim Peterik, member of the band Survivor; co-wrote "Eye of the Tiger"
- Allison Rosati, WMAQ-TV weeknight anchor
- Bobby Simmons, professional basketball player
- Jim Thome, former major league baseball player and National Baseball Hall of Famer
- Dan K. Webb, Co-executive chairman of Winston & Strawn and former U.S. Attorney for the Northern District of Illinois

== Government and infrastructure ==
Burr Ridge is located in Illinois's 3rd congressional district, which has been represented by Democrat Marie Newman

Burr Ridge is served by Pleasantview Fire Protection District (headquartered in LaGrange Highlands) and Tri-State Fire Protection District (headquartered in Darien). Tri-State Fire Protection District Station 3 is located on Madison Street in southern Burr Ridge.

=== Transportation ===
Pace provides bus service from the Burr Ridge Park-n-Ride via Routes 850 and 855 which travel on I-55 from Plainfield to Chicago.

== Education ==
Primary schools

- Burr Ridge Community Consolidated School District 180 (Anne M. Jeans Elementary School, Burr Ridge Middle School)
- Gower School District 62 (Gower West Elementary School, Gower Middle School)
- Hinsdale School District 181 (Elm School, Hinsdale Middle School)
- Pleasantdale School District 107 (Pleasantdale Elementary School, Pleasantdale Middle School)
- Trinity Lutheran School

High schools

- Hinsdale Township High School District 86 (Hinsdale Central High School, Hinsdale South High School)
- Lyons Township High School District 204

Community colleges

- Community College District #502 (College of DuPage)

== Parks ==
Burr Ridge includes 12 major parks. One of the largest parks, and home of the Burr Ridge Park District, is Harvester Park. Other larger parks include "Pleasantdale Park District" with adjacent Walker Park at 7425 S. Wolf Road in the Cook County portion of the Village. In DuPage County are Citizens Park, Kraml Park, Palisades Park, Stevens Park, and Whittaker Park in the south, Garywood Park and McCullough Park on Plainfield Road, and Oak Grove Park and Woods Pool Park in the north.

== Religious institutions ==
- St. Peter and St. Paul Orthodox Church
- Trinity Lutheran Church, a congregation of the Lutheran Church–Missouri Synod, organized on December 31, 1865. The church supports an elementary school with an enrollment of 137 students (as of 2007), founded in 1883, and is National Lutheran Schools Accredited (NLSA).
- St. Mark Coptic Orthodox Church, a congregation of the Coptic Orthodox Church of Alexandria (Egypt), was built in 1981 and was completed in 1983. The church conducts liturgies every Sunday and supports a Montessori pre-school.
- St. Helena's Episcopal Church of the Episcopal Diocese of Chicago was founded in the mid-1950s. The church supports multiple food ministries including a 24/7 food donation drop box and a partnership with Vacant 2 Vegetables, which provides fresh produce to area food banks with vegetables grown on the church's 5-acre site.
- Zoroastrian Center of Chicago, is one of the few Zoroastrian institutions in Illinois. It was founded in 1975.
