= Samsung Rising =

2020 book by Geoffrey Cain

- Author: Geoffrey Cain
- Language: English
- Subject: Samsung
- Published: March 17, 2020
- Publisher: Crown Publishing
- Media type: Print
- Pages: 416
- ISBN: 978-1101907252

Samsung Rising: The Inside Story of the South Korean Giant That Set Out to Beat Apple and Conquer Tech is a 2020 book by American journalist and author Geoffrey Cain. The book talks about the rise of Samsung and its impact on the global technology industry, as well as its influence on South Korea’s politics and culture. The book was published by Crown Publishing.

== Summary ==
Based on years of reporting in South Korea for publications such as The Economist, The Wall Street Journal and Time, journalist Geoffrey Cain examines Samsung’s transformation from a small agricultural conglomerate into a global technology leader. As the book explains, Samsung was founded as a Korean agricultural conglomerate that produced sugar, paper and fertilizer, located in a third-world country. It then entered the computer chips and semiconductor industry under Chairman Lee Byung-Chul during the early computer era. The company later became a major supplier of components for Apple’s iPhone, while its own Galaxy smartphones grew to rival and outsell competitors in several markets. The book also discusses challenges such as the Galaxy Note 7 recall, highlighting the risks tied to rapid growth and competition.

== Reception ==
Samsung Rising was longlisted for the 2020 Financial Times and McKinsey Business Book of the Year Award, and won the Gold Medal Axiom Business Book Awards in 2021. It was also listed in ‘Best Technology Books’ list by Wired and Cult of Mac.

According to The Financial Times, "Geoffrey Cain does his material proud and marshals it around episodes and milestones. This allows for a few cliffhanger chapter endings, while also enabling the characters’ foibles to shine through."

According to the Wall Street Journal, "Samsung Rising reads like a dynastic thriller, rolling through three generations of family intrigue, embezzlement, bribery, corruption, prostitution and other bad behavior."
