= Pleasantdale School District 107 =

School district in Illinois, United States

Address
- 7450 Wolf Road Burr Ridge, Illinois, 60527; United States

District information
- Type: Public
- Grades: PreK–8
- NCES District ID: 1732040

Students and staff
- Students: 836

Other information
- Website: www.d107.org

Pleasantdale School District 107 is a school district headquartered on the grounds of Pleasantdale Middle School in Burr Ridge, Illinois. It operates the district's elementary school in LaGrange, Illinois.
