= Graham McIlvaine =

American volleyball player (born 1992)

Graham Mcilvaine

Personal information
- Born: August 2, 1992 (age 34); Hinsdale, Illinois, U.S.
- Hometown: Hinsdale, Illinois, U.S.
- Height: 6 ft 6 in (198 cm)
- Weight: 218 lb (99 kg)
- Spike: 135 in (343 cm)
- Block: 130 in (330 cm)
- Education: Ball State University

Volleyball information
- Number: 25 (national team)

Career
Years	Teams
2015	Marienlyst

National team
2015	United States

Graham Mcilvaine (born August 2, 1992) is an American volleyball player. He was part of the United States men's national volleyball team. On club level he plays for Marienlyst.

== High school career ==
Mcilvaine attended Hinsdale Central High School in Hinsdale, Illinois from 2006 to 2010. Mcilvaine was a three-year letterman in volleyball for the Red Devils, and led in kills as a junior in 2009 and as a senior in 2010 as a setter. Mcilvaine was a two-time West Suburban Conference All-Conference selection at Hinsdale Central, while also earning regional titles in 2008 and 2009. In 2009, Mcilvaine was named second team All-Sun Times, and was named First Team All-Sun Times in 2010. As a high school senior, Mcilvaine earned American Volleyball Coaches Association Second Team All-America honors for his 706 assists.

== College career ==
Mcilvaine competed collegiately for Ball State University from 2011 to 2014. Macilvaine majored in sales while earning four variety letters for the Cardinals. Mcilvaine finished his career eighth in the program with 9.53 career assists per average, sixth in program history with 3,211 career assists and 2014 All-Midwest Intercollegiate Volleyball Association Second Team honors.
