= Manu Raju =

American journalist (born 1980)

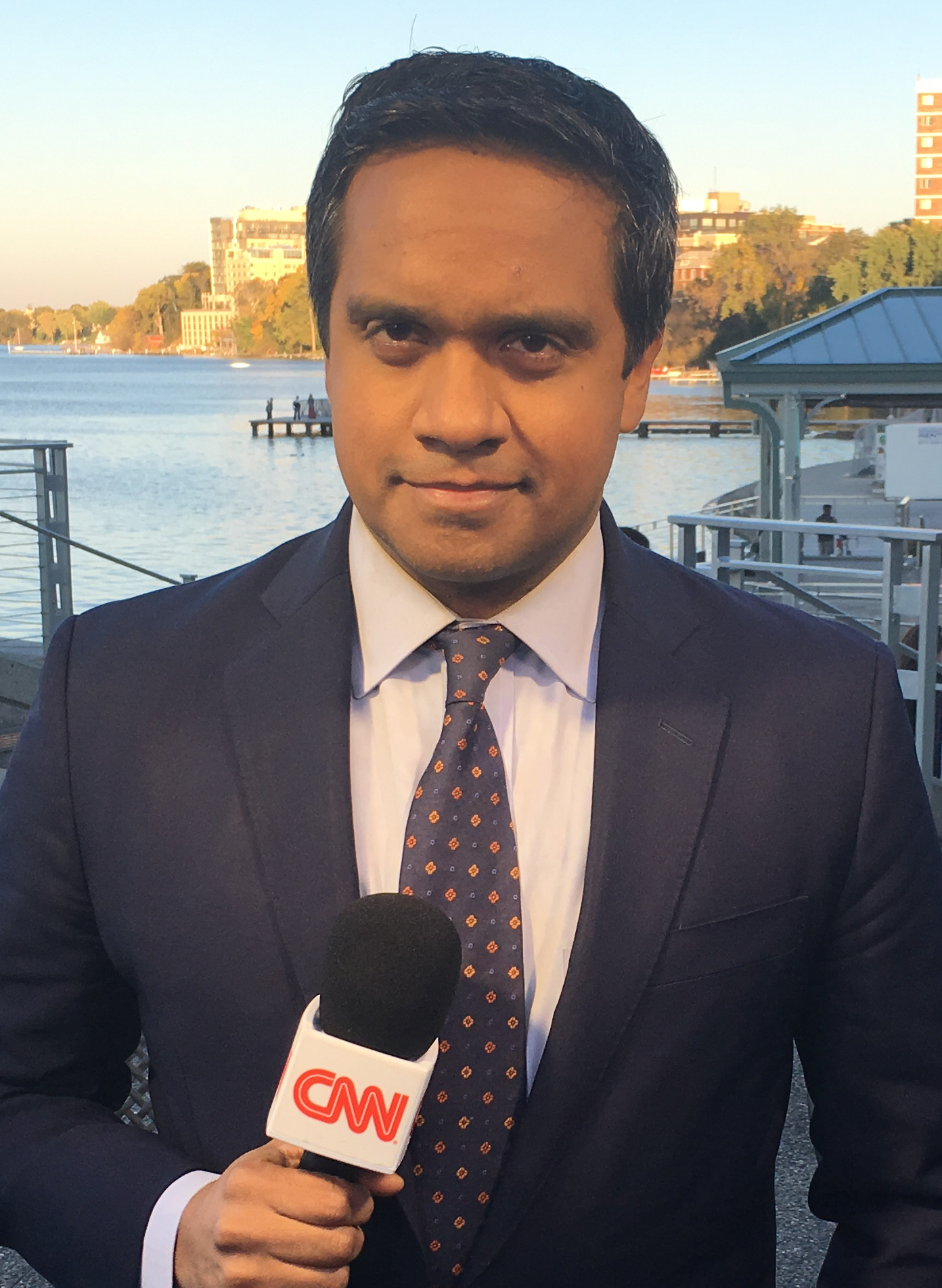
- Raju in 2016
- Born: February 9, 1980 (age 46); Downers Grove, Illinois, U.S.
- Education: University of Wisconsin-Madison (BBA)
- Occupation: Journalist at CNN
- Spouse: Archana Mehta
- Children: 2
- Relatives: Sharat Raju (brother); Gopalakrishna Adiga (grandfather)
- Website: Manu Raju on X

Manu K. Raju (born February 9, 1980) is an American journalist who serves as the chief congressional correspondent at the news network CNN, covering the United States Congress and campaign politics. He is also anchor of the Sunday edition of CNN's Inside Politics with Manu Raju. Raju previously reported for Politico as a senior Capitol Hill correspondent and for other D.C. news outlets as well.

Raju has won multiple journalism awards for his reporting on D.C. and his coverage of campaign politics. Raju moderated debates for the 2014 U.S. Senate election in Colorado and the 2014 Colorado gubernatorial election. He has regularly interviewed major political figures on national TV, including House Speakers Paul Ryan and Nancy Pelosi, Republican Senate leader Mitch McConnell, former Senate minority leader Harry Reid, and Senators Marco Rubio, John McCain, and Lindsey Graham.

== Early life and education ==
Raju grew up in Darien, Illinois, the son of Tonse N. K. Raju and Vidya Raju, both of whom immigrated from Karnataka, India in the 1970s and both of whom later worked at the National Institutes of Health. His father, Tonse Raju, is a neonatologist and formerly a professor of pediatrics at the University of Illinois at Chicago. His grandfather Gopalakrishna Adiga was a poet from India who wrote in Kannada. Raju attended Hinsdale South High School, graduating in 1998. He attended the University of Wisconsin–Madison, graduating in 2002 with a degree in business administration. During college, Raju worked as the sports editor for The Badger Herald.

== Career ==
Raju first started working on the assignment desk at WMTV in Madison, Wisconsin, before moving to Washington, D.C. in 2002. There, he took a job with Inside Washington Publishers, covering environmental policy. He later worked for Congressional Quarterly, The Hill, and Politico, where he reported for seven years before joining CNN in September 2015. Before joining CNN, Raju was a regular guest on many networks and programs, including NBC's Meet the Press and CBS' Face the Nation. When he was hired by CNN, Erik Wemple of The Washington Post called the move a "towering get" for the network.

Raju has developed a reputation for finding out what politicians are discussing behind the scenes, and broke major stories during the 2013 government shutdown and during Senate Minority Leader Mitch McConnell's high-profile reelection race in 2014. Raju broke a story about how McConnell's opponent Alison Lundergan Grimes appeared to be getting an illegal campaign bus from her father, who was later sentenced to prison for campaign finance violations.

In 2016 for CNN, Raju was the network's lead correspondent covering Senator Marco Rubio's presidential campaign. He extensively covered the GOP establishment's struggle with Donald Trump and broke big news in high-profile Senate races, including in New Hampshire.

In 2017, Raju was featured on the cover of India Abroad newspaper, which dubbed him the "King of the Hill" for his reporting on key decision-makers in the United States and on Capitol Hill. "Raju excels at that inside-the-room reporting," a former Politico editor was quoted as saying. The article called Raju "one of the very few Indian American journalists in such a prominent position in the mainstream media."

In 2017, Raju and Jeremy Herb reported for CNN that the Donald Trump 2016 presidential campaign, including Donald Trump Jr, had access to hacked documents from WikiLeaks before such documents were publicly available. The story was found to be incorrect and was retracted. CNN's report was criticized by Julian Assange, and Trump Jr. tweeted at Manu Raju, "I won't hold my breath for an apology, or for you to call out your puppet masters on the left that fed you BS knowing you would gleefully run with it without ever checking the other side". However, CNN stated it would not take disciplinary action as Raju had followed CNN's editorial standards process.

Raju broke a major news story in January 2017 when he detailed a stock trade that raised ethical and legal questions for Tom Price, President Donald Trump's Health and Human Services nominee. The Trump administration requested a retraction, but fact-checkers found Raju's story to be accurate, and Wemple called Raju's reporting on the story "a model of careful and measured journalism."

On January 6, 2021, Raju was broadcasting inside the U.S. Capitol during the attack on the building, reporting in real-time events as they were unfolding.

In 2021, CNN announced Raju had been promoted to the network's chief congressional correspondent.

In August 2023, CNN announced that Raju would begin anchoring the Sunday edition of Inside Politics while maintaining his role on Capitol Hill.

== Awards ==
In 2012, Raju was part of a team of four reporters that won the White House Correspondents Association's prestigious Merriman Smith Memorial Award for presidential reporting under deadline pressure for their coverage of the 2011 debt ceiling crisis. In 2015, Raju was awarded first prize by the Society of Professional Journalists in D.C. for beat coverage of the 2014 midterm elections, and a Folio Eddie Award for a feature profile he co-authored on Senator Elizabeth Warren.

In 2015, Washington Life magazine named Raju one of the city's "movers and shakers" under the age of 40. That year, he was inducted into the Hall of Fame for his high school, Hinsdale South.

In 2017, Raju was honored with the 2016 Joan Shorenstein Barone Award for excellence in Washington-based reporting of Congressional and political affairs for his coverage of Congress and campaign politics. He was given the award at the 2017 Radio and TV Correspondents Association dinner in Washington, where the host, Bobby Bones, credited his "tenacity" and "relentless" coverage. The judges awarded Raju with the prize for his piece detailing how the New Hampshire Senate candidates from both parties struggled to embrace their respective presidential nominees, providing "forward-looking and sharp coverage of the dynamics affecting congressional races around the country" and "skillfully questioning candidates by pushing them to go beyond talking points."

== Personal life ==
Raju and his wife, Archana Mehta, are the parents of twins, a boy and girl, born in 2015.

Raju's brother, Sharat Raju is a film and TV director.
