= National Shrine of St Therese =

Roman Catholic shrine

Coordinates: 41.733437°N 87.976713°W

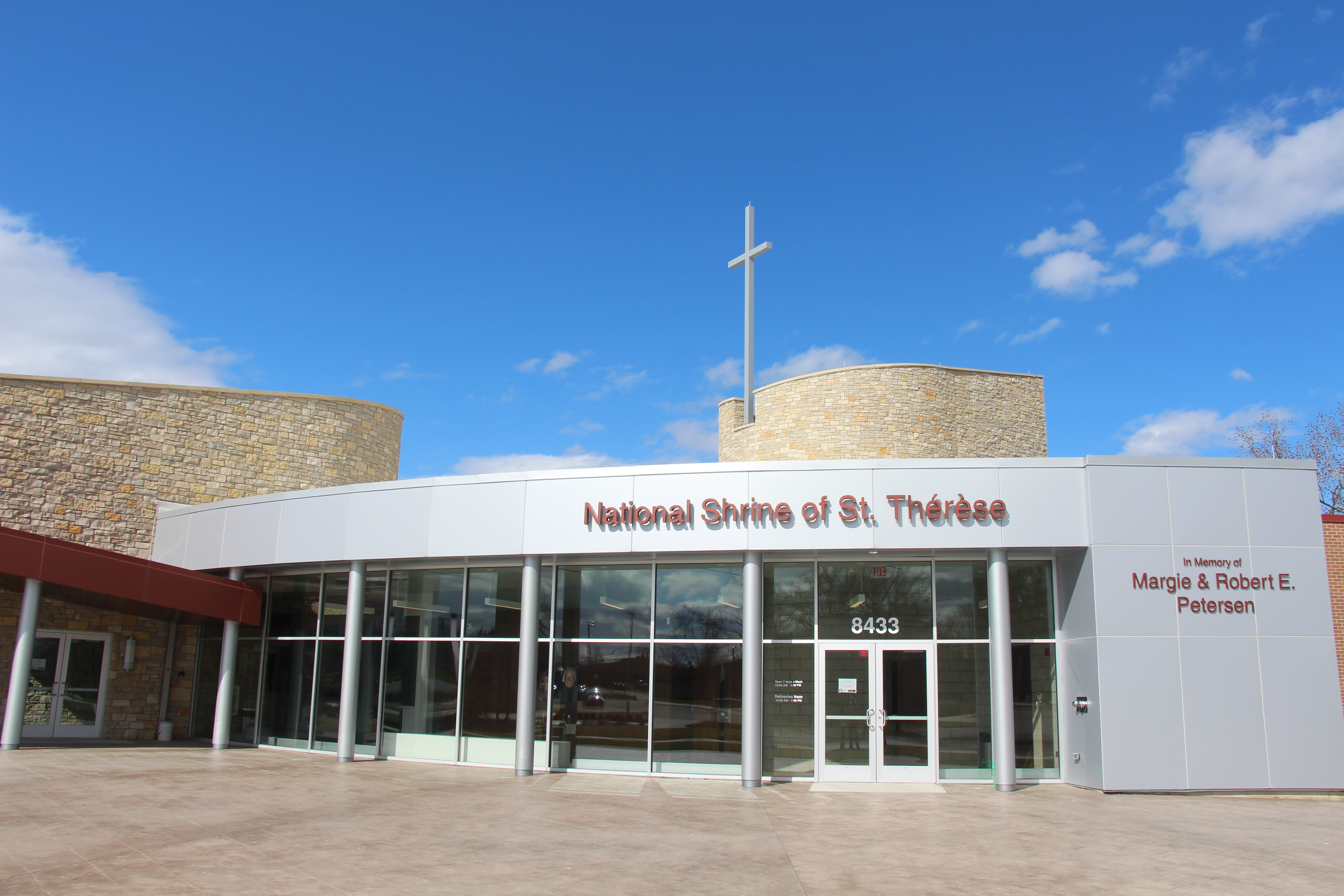
The National Shrine of St. Therese Exterior, April 2019

The National Shrine of St. Therese in Darien, Illinois, is a Catholic shrine dedicated to Thérèse of Lisieux. It is a part of the Aylesford Carmelite campus run by the Province of the Most Pure Heart of Mary. It is supported and served by the Society of the Little Flower, a religious organization devoted to the saint.

== History ==
The original and first National Shrine to St. Therese began at St. Cyril's Church in Chicago in 1923, as devotion to the Little Flower was growing. The shrine held novenas to St. Thérèse every Tuesday. Because of her great popularity, it was moved to the larger St. Clara's Church in the Woodlawn neighborhood of Chicago. The Tuesday novenas drew thousands of devoted friends. During this time, relics and personal effects of the new saint, who was canonized in 1925, were received from the Carmelites Nuns of Lisieux in gratitude for the support the Carmelite Province of the Most Pure of Mary gave for her beatification and canonization.

In the 1950s, the United States Conference of Catholic Bishops declared the site a National Shrine. With changing demographics, the crowds lessened. In 1975, fire destroyed St. Clara's Carmelite Church in the south side of Chicago, and effectively destroyed the National Shrine of St. Therese.

The Carmelites were faced with the financial challenge of reconstruction of the Shrine. In 1959 the Carmelites had purchased the summer home of late congressman Martin B. Madden to create the Aylesford campus, named after Aylesford Priory, the order's motherhouse in England. A large bequest from a devoted Lay Carmelite made it possible for the Carmelites to build a new Shrine facility on the Aylesford Carmelite campus in Darien, Illinois.

Fr. Terry Sempowski, then Director of the Little Flower Society, oversaw the design and construction, trying to be faithful to Carmelite spirituality and her “little way.” The Shrine building was dedicated on November 1, 1987.

In 1999–2000, the Carmelites sponsored the tour of the Relics of St. Therese throughout North America, with the leadership of Fr. Bob Colaresi, O. Carm. Large crowds met her everywhere, and especially at the National Shrine in Darien. This amazing experience opened the doors to more and more people coming to daily Mass and other events on campus. A decision was made to expand the Shrine and double its capacity, to meet the needs of the people coming. The expanded Shrine was blessed in February 2002.

A generous gift from the Margie & Robert E. Petersen Foundation allowed the Society of the Little Flower to begin construction on a new Shrine building based on the design of Charles Vincent George Architects. The new building is located adjacent to the current Shrine Museum. Work on the new Shrine was completed in 2018. The larger building houses a number of devotional stations for Carmelite saints and can accommodate large groups of worshipers in the Shrine sanctuary.

The Shrine of the Infant Jesus of Prague is a part of the National Shrine of St. Therese.

== Museum ==
The National Shrine museum is a rich treasury of relics and memorabilia of St. Therese. It contains the largest and most complete collection of Little Flower objects outside of Lisieux, France.

Highlights of the National Shrine Museum include several first-class relics of St. Therese, photographs of her, paintings of scenes from her life, a special Prayer Gazebo, and a full-sized exact replica of her convent cell which includes several second-class relics. Video screens explain everything in the museum.

A part of the National Shrine Museum is a huge stain-glass window that beautifully and artistically depicts the journey of the soul to God, modeled on St. John of the Cross’ Ascent of Mount Carmel. St. Therese’s spiritual journey is very parallel to St. John of the Cross’ teachings.

On the side of the National Shrine Museum is a massive wood carving of the life of St. Therese. It tells her whole life story in a visual and beautiful way. It is the largest wood carving of a religious nature in the United States.

As St. Therese was a Carmelite contemplative cloistered Nun, she was dedicated to Our Lady of Mount Carmel, the patroness of the Carmelites. Our Lady of Mount Carmel is the patroness of Contemplatives and teaches us as “our sister in faith” to be present to our life where God reveals His great, ever-present love and presence. The National Shrine Museum features a large collection of Our Lady of Mount Carmel statues from around the world.

== Services ==
Mass is celebrated in the Shrine at 11:30 a.m., Monday through Friday and the Shrine welcomes both individual visitors and organized tour groups. Each year, thousands of pilgrims from around the world visit the Shrine. There is a religious gift shop within the Shrine building where visitors can purchase books, devotional aids, and other Theresian items.

Every year on October 1, the Feast Day of St. Therese is celebrated at the National Shrine. The special event includes Mass, veneration of the relics of St. Therese and special talks about the saint known as the "little flower".

== Sources ==
- Fr. Robert Colaresi, O. Carm.
- Society of Mount Carmel (Order of Carmelites, Province of the Most Pure Heart of Mary)
