= Geoffrey Cain =

American journalist, author, and writer

- Education: George Washington University (BA); SOAS University of London (MA)
- Occupation: Journalist
- Writing career
- Years active: 2008-present
- Works: Samsung Rising and The Perfect Police State

Geoffrey Cain is an American journalist and author. He writes about geopolitics, national security, technology and multinational companies. His reporting has been published in The Economist, Time, Wired (magazine), Foreign Policy, The New Republic, The Spectator and The Wall Street Journal. He is a regular commentator on Bloomberg TV, BBC, CNN, and NPR.

Cain is the author of the books, Samsung Rising and The Perfect Police State. He received the citation for the Cornelius Ryan Award for The Perfect Police State.

He has been accused of spying by news media aligned with the Cambodian People's Party. This was part of a political crackdown leading up to the arrest of Kem Sokha, the former leader of the now-disbanded opposition party, on treason charges.

== Education ==
Cain attended George Washington University in Washington, D.C., where he received his BA. His studies continued in London, where he received an MA with distinction from the SOAS University of London. He was also a Fulbright scholar in Vietnam.

== Career ==
Cain began his career as a journalist in Asia, working mainly in Vietnam and Cambodia. From 2008 onwards, he worked for The Economist.

In 2009, Cain settled in South Korea as a writer for Time, covering politics, business and culture in North and South Korea. In 2015, he took a train across North Korea, visiting Pyongyang and remote places in the north of the country. His train journey received coverage in a number of newspapers in the west, including The Telegraph.

In 2012, he joined GlobalPost as the Senior Correspondent for Japan and Korea.

In 2014, Cain published a series of reports on labor crackdowns in Cambodia which resulted in a dispute with the Cambodian government. His work on the subject led Cain to be a finalist for the Society of Publishers in Asia (SOPA) award.

In August 2017, he was accused of spying on Cambodia by news media aligned with Prime Minister Hun Sen and collaborating with the opposition party, Cambodia National Rescue Party. Cain flatly denied the claims, stating he knew Samathida Kem, the opposition leader's daughter, from a university in the United States. In November 2017, he wrote an article for The Nation, speaking about Kem Sokha's arrest in September of that year. By this point, the opposition leader had been charged with treason by the ruling party of Cambodia.

During the same period, Cain reported on the alleged growing backlash in South Korea against the power of a number of large family-owned businesses, known as the chaebol. These included corporations such as Samsung, Hyundai and LG. He regularly commented in the media and wrote a number of articles on the subject of Samsung's involvement in the 2016 South Korean political scandal. After Lee Jae-yong was arrested as part of a bribery scandal linked to a controversial 2015 merger, and then was released from prison in February 2018 when a court reduced but upheld his bribery conviction, Cain frequently spoke about South Korea's alleged leniency on white collar crime.

In 2022, Cain interviewed Ukrainian president Zelenskyy discussing how technology such as drones, volunteer hackers in Ukraine’s IT Army and tools like Starlink have transformed Ukraine’s war against Russia. He wrote the legislation that governs US technology supply chains and testified before Congress on the national-security threats of TikTok and other apps.

Cain served as an advisor to the United States House Foreign Affairs Committee, a term member of the Council on Foreign Relations, was a former senior fellow for advanced critical emerging technologies at Foundation for American Innovation and was a visiting senior fellow at the GeoTech Center at the Atlantic Council.

Cain is also the Managing Partner of Alembic Partners and Advisory Council Member of Tech Diplomacy.

== Books ==
=== Samsung Rising ===
In 2020, Cain authored the book, Samsung Rising: The Inside Story of the South Korean Giant That Set Out to Beat Apple and Conquer Tech (ISBN 9781101907269), published by Crown. The book is about the rise of Samsung and its influence on global technology industries and South Korea's politics and culture. This became more topical following the arrest and sentencing of Lee Jae-yong at Samsung. Cain argues Samsung's alleged influence and power can be seen when Lee walked free and received a suspended sentence.

According to The Financial Times, Geoffrey Cain does his material proud and marshals it around episodes and milestones. This allows for a few cliffhanger chapter endings, while also enabling the characters’ foibles to shine through.

=== The Perfect Police State ===
In 2022, Cain wrote and released the book, The Perfect Police State: An Undercover Odyssey into China's Terrifying Surveillance Dystopia of the Future (ISBN 9781541757011) published by PublicAffairs. According to Kirkus Reviews, the book is “A prescient, alarming work on the overreach of technology and state power.”

=== Steve Jobs in Exile ===
In 2026, Cain authored the book, Steve Jobs in Exile (ISBN 978-0593716700), published by Portfolio. The nonfiction book is about Steve Jobs' tenure at NeXT and Pixar, how Jobs learned to be a successful leader. Kirkus Reviews notes that the book is a lively account of Steve Jobs’ interregnum between his ouster from Apple and his reemergence as a creative force.

== Recognition ==
Cain's book Samsung Rising was longlisted for the 2020 Financial Times and McKinsey Business Book of the Year award, and won the Gold Medal Axiom Business Book Awards in 2021. It was also listed in ‘Best Technology Books’ list by Wired and Cult of Mac.

His other book The Perfect Police State received the Overseas Press Club’s Cornelius Ryan Award citation and was also recognized as NPR’s Book of the Day in 2022.
