= Discrimination and National Security Initiative =

Discrimination & National Security Initiative (DNSI) is a research organization affiliated with the Pluralism Project, a Harvard University project that studies religious diversity in the United States.

Following the September 11 attacks, several communities within the United States experienced and continue to endure a prolonged and wanton backlash. In particular, Sikh, Muslim, Arab, South Asian, and other American communities have confronted verbal harassment, employment discrimination, physical assault, and even murder. For example, Balbir Singh Sodhi, a turbaned Sikh, was murdered just days after the September 11 attacks.

In response to the post-9/11 climate and the need to understand how discrimination has impacted these targeted communities in the United States, DNSI was created. The purpose of the project is to examine the mistreatment of minority communities in times of war or national crisis. DNSI is specifically interested in the human consequences of such mistreatment. In addition to performing research and releasing substantive reports, DNSI regularly notes relevant incidents and developments on its blog.

DNSI was officially established on December 18, 2004, the 60th anniversary of Korematsu v. United States, the Supreme Court of the United States case that upheld the forced exclusion of citizens of Japanese ancestry, including the Japanese American Internment. The dissenting justices warned of the use of perceived race, ethnicity, or national origin as a proxy for suspect qualities, including subversion and disloyalty to the union, during wartime.

DNSI examines discrimination and its social impact not just in the aftermath of the September 11 attacks, but also in other historical and international contexts that implicate the tension between equality and concerns for national security, such as the backlash against Muslims after the 7 July 2005 London bombings and the broader debate regarding assimilation and multiculturalism that is taking place in several Western societies (see, United Kingdom debate over veils).

DNSI is directed by Valarie Kaur, creator, writer, and producer of the documentary, "Divided We Fall", and Dawinder “Dave” S. Sidhu, a civil rights attorney.

DNSI issued its first report, "We are Americans Too: A Comparative Study of the Effects of 9/11 on South Asian Communities," on the fifth anniversary of the September 11 attacks. The report addresses the impact of and the responses to the discrimination that South Asians faced since 9/11, focusing specifically on Indian Hindus, Pakistani Muslims, and Sikhs in the Washington, D.C., area.

Its second report, "The Sikh Turban: Post-911 Challenges to this Article of Faith," examines the tangible and intangible discrimination faced by turbaned Sikhs in the wake of the 9/11, terrorist attacks. This report, issued in the spring of 2008, provides an overview of Sikhism, incidents of discrimination, broader challenges to Sikh identity, and legal remedies available to victims. The report is currently being adapted into an academic text.
