= Rishi Shah =

American businessman

- Born: 1986 (age 39–40); Oak Brook, Illinois, US
- Education: Northwestern University (dropped out)
- Occupation: Businessman
- Title: Chairman, JumpStart Ventures
- Parent(s): Upendra Shah; Sonal Shah

Rishi Shah (born 1986) is an American businessman convicted of fraud and a former chairman and CEO of Outcome Health, which he co-founded.

== Early life ==
Rishi Shah was born in 1986 in Oak Brook, Illinois, the son of Sonal Shah and her husband Dr Upendra Shah, an endocrinologist. He was educated at Hinsdale Central High School and Northwestern University, but dropped out to start a business career.

== Career ==
Shah developed a business plan for ContextMedia at Northwestern with classmates Derek Moeller and Shradha Agarwal in 2006 to distribute health educational content to doctors' offices and waiting rooms monetized by ad revenue from pharmaceutical companies. ContextMedia grew revenues 2,965% from 2010 to 2015 to $63.5 million with Shah as CEO, ranking it as the 6th fastest-growing private company in Chicago in 2016. In 2017, ContextMedia rebranded itself as Outcome Health.

In May 2017, Outcome Health raised over $500 million from investors led by Goldman Sachs, CapitalG, and Pritzker Group at a $5.6 billion valuation. This is the largest single funding round since Groupon in 2011, when it raised $950 million in its fifth funding round. In 2017, Forbes estimated Shah's net worth at $3.6 billion based on his 80% stake in Outcome Health.

Investors in Outcome Health sued the company, Shah, and Agarwal in November 2017, claiming fraud and breach of contract. This followed a Wall Street Journal investigation published in October 2017 alleging that Outcome Health misled advertisers with manipulated information. In January 2018, Outcome Health announced that the lawsuit has been settled, with the founders reinvesting $159 million of their $225 million investment dividends back into the company. Shah resigned as chairman and CEO as part of the settlement.

== Fraud and allegations ==
In November 2019, Shah and coworkers were charged for their alleged roles in a fraud scheme that targeted the company’s clients, lenders and investors, and involved approximately $1 billion in fraudulently obtained funds. On April 11, 2023, Shah and two other Outcome Health executives were convicted and found guilty of multiple counts of committing fraud. Shah was found guilty of five counts of mail fraud, 10 counts of wire fraud, two counts of bank fraud, and two counts of money laundering.

On June 25, 2024, Shah was sentenced to 7.5 years in prison for his role in a $1 billion fraud scheme. Alongside Shah, Outcome Health co-founder Shradha Agarwal and former COO Brad Purdy were also found guilty, with their sentencing scheduled for later in the same week.

== See also ==
- Theranos
