= Empirical Foods =

American meat processing company

- Type: Private
- Industry: Meat processing
- Founded: 1981; 45 years ago Amarillo, Texas, U.S.
- Founders: Eldon Roth; Regina Roth
- Headquarters: Dakota Dunes, South Dakota
- Website: empiricalfoods.com

Empirical Foods, formerly named Beef Products Inc. (BPI), is an American meat processing company based in Dakota Dunes, South Dakota. Prior to high media visibility of its products, it was a major supplier to fast food chains, groceries and school lunch programs. It had three additional plants, which closed in 2012.

== History ==
Beef Products Inc. was established in 1981 by Eldon Roth.

In 2007, after the USDA reviewed BPI's processing technique, the company was exempted from routine testing of hamburger meat.

In December 2009, The New York Times reported that as early as 2003, school lunch officials and other customers had complained that the product tasted and smelled like ammonia, after which the company devised a plan to make a less alkaline version. The USDA determined that at least some of BPI's product was no longer receiving "the full lethality treatment." The New York Times reported that BPI's products had tested positive for E. coli three times and salmonella 48 times since 2005. This prompted the USDA to revoke the exemption and conduct a review of the company's practices.

In July 2011, after widespread coverage of an unrelated E. coli outbreak in Germany linked to sprouts, Beef Products Inc. began voluntarily testing its beef products for six additional strains of E. coli contamination because the FDA had not taken any formal actions for increased safety actions. The testing began at one of its plants, with a planned expansion to the rest of its U.S. plants when the test kit manufacturer could increase its production to meet the demand.

In 2012, after a series of ABC News reports, concern amongst the public led McDonald's, Burger King, Taco Bell, Wal-Mart, Safeway, and several other grocery stores to abandon the product. Company officials suspended production at three of its four plants. The United States Department of Agriculture issued a statement supporting the product's safety, and the company launched a public relations offensive with the help of governors Rick Perry, Terry Branstad, and Sam Brownback, who joined ABC News on a tour of the remaining plant.

Beef Products Inc. closed its facilities in Amarillo, Texas; Garden City, Kansas; and Waterloo, Iowa on May 25, 2012.

As of 2024, Empirical was building a new 280,000 square foot facility in Garden City. The facility had initially been announced in 2019 and with an opening date in the 2022-2023 timeframe, and broke ground in 2020. As of May 2025, the facility had not yet opened.

On September 13, 2012, the company announced it would be suing ABC News for $1.2 billion in a defamation lawsuit.

BPI was a major supplier to McDonald's and Burger King, as well as restaurants and grocery stores, and its products were reportedly used in 75% of the United States' hamburger patties in 2008. The School Lunch Program, another large buyer of Beef Product's goods, used about 5.5 million pounds in 2009.

== Product ==
Beef Products Inc. is the creator of a product called "lean finely textured beef," also known as "pink slime." The latter term was first used in 2002 by a Food Safety Inspection Service worker.

In 2002, it patented a process that turns materials that had previously gone for pet food or oil into products for human consumption. In this process, beef trimmings are warmed, put through a centrifuge to remove fat, then treated with ammonia to increase pH and kill bacteria.

The product is found as a lean meat source which has been added to ground beef, constituting up to 25 percent of the final product. This process is approved by the U.S. Department of Agriculture and Food and Drug Administration.

Carol Tucker Foreman, director of the Food Safety Institute for the Consumer Federation of America, and Nancy Donley, president of the industry-funded group Safe Tables Our Priority, are strong backers of this technology-based approach to food safety. Journalists, however, have questioned the safety of meat treated with the process.
