= Bankruptcy examiner =

Investigator of a bankruptcy case

Bankruptcy examiners are investigators of bankruptcy cases. Whereas the role of the trustee is to operate the business of the debtor, the role of the examiner is to investigate and report to the court. They are not common and have been used in some celebrated cases such as the 1990 bankruptcy of Interco Incorporated.

== Overview ==
A professional appointed by the bankruptcy court to investigate and oversee certain aspects of the debtor or the proceedings. By way of comparison, the role of the trustee is to operate the business of the debtor whereas the role of the examiner is to investigate and report to the court. In bankruptcy cases, an examiner refers to an officer appointed by a bankruptcy for the purpose of reviewing certain aspects of the operation of a Chapter 11 debtor. Although his/her main function is investigation, an examiner is usually called as mediators to assist the court in resolving bankruptcy disputes. An Examiner can be appointed in complicated Chapter 11 case involving a utility with instructions to investigate fraud and other irregularities, and to mediate and assist in breaking a deadlock in plan negotiations. [In re Big Rivers Elec. Corp., 213 B.R. 962, 976 (Bankr. D. Ky. 1997)]
