= Outcome Health =

Healthcare technology company in the US

- Formerly: Context Media (2006–January 2017)
- Industry: Health Technology, Advertising
- Founded: 2006, Chicago, Illinois
- Founder: Rishi Shah, Shradha Agarwal
- Fate: Assets sold following fraud scandal; executives convicted

Outcome Health is a Chicago-based healthcare technology company founded by Rishi Shah. Its registered name is ContextMedia Health LLC. It is majority owned by Littlejohn & Co., a private equity firm. Its founders were indicted and convicted by a federal grand jury on multiple charges of fraud and also sued by the SEC, with veteran tech investor Howard A. Tullman describing Outcome as "our version of Theranos."

== History ==
Outcome Health was founded in 2006 by Rishi Shah and Shradha Agarwal under the name Context Media. Its core business involved placing wall-mounted televisions and tablets in physicians' waiting and exam rooms. These devices provided free medical information to patients, while the company generated revenue by selling advertising space on this network primarily to pharmaceutical companies.

=== Funding rounds ===
In May 2017, a funding round with Goldman Sachs, CapitalG, Pritzker Group, and others invested over $500 million in Outcome Health, giving it a $5.6 billion valuation. This is the largest single funding round in Chicago since Groupon in 2011, when it raised $950 million in its fifth funding round. The investment, based on the company's reported financial success and growth potential, propelled Outcome Health to unicorn status with a valuation exceeding $5 billion and brought its total raised capital to approximately $500 million.

== Fraud scheme and allegations ==
=== Client fraud ===
In late 2017, reports emerged alleging that Outcome Health had misled its advertising clients. A subsequent federal investigation uncovered a deliberate, long-running fraud scheme that operated from 2011 to 2017. The scheme involved two primary forms of fraud. First, the executives committed client fraud by selling advertising inventory the company did not have and systematically under-delivering on its advertising campaigns. Despite not fulfilling contracts, Outcome Health invoiced clients as if it had delivered in full, resulting in at least $45 million in overbilled advertising services.

=== Investor and lender fraud ===
The company used the inflated revenue from this client fraud to commit investor and lender fraud. The fraud caused the company's revenue for 2015 and 2016 to be materially overstated, and its outside auditor approved these financial statements after being provided with falsified data by executives. Using inflated revenue figures, the company then secured massive financing rounds. This included securing $110 million in debt financing in April 2016, from which Shah received a $30.2 million dividend and Agarwal received a $7.5 million dividend. The company also secured $375 million in debt financing in December 2016 and $487.5 million in equity financing in early 2017, which funded a $225 million dividend benefiting Shah and Agarwal.

The fraud allegations gained public traction after a Wall Street Journal investigation in late 2017. Internally, concerns were raised quickly; a new C-suite hire reportedly raised alarm bells within weeks of joining and left the company after only three weeks.

According to a report in The Wall Street Journal unnamed former employees and advertisers accused the company of overcharging their customers for advertisements and misquoting third-party analyses and falsifying documents on the ads' performance. According to the accusations, Outcome Health reported that the ads appeared on more video screens than they had installed. Lanny Davis, a company spokesperson, responded by saying a law firm had been hired to "review allegations about certain employees' conduct that have been raised internally."

In November 2017, COO Vivek Kundra left the company. Also in November, several advertisers stopped working with Outcome Health and investors sued the company claiming fraud and breach of contract.

As of January 2018, Outcome Health decided to settle outstanding investor lawsuits in exchange for having Shah and Agarwal step down. In June 2018, Matt McNally, former chief media officer at Publicis Health, was announced as the company's new CEO.

== Legal proceedings, trial, and sentencing ==
Following a 2017 Wall Street Journal report on potential fraud at the company, federal investigations began. In 2019, the U.S. Department of Justice indicted three former top executives and the U.S. Securities and Exchange Commission (SEC) filed parallel civil charges. Rishi Shah (former CEO and co-founder, Shradha Agarwal (former President and co-founder), Brad Purdy (former COO and CFO) and a fourth executive, Ashik Desai (former Chief Growth Officer), pleaded guilty to wire fraud in December 2019 and cooperated with prosecutors. Two former analysts, Kathryn Choi and Oliver Han, also pleaded guilty to conspiracy to commit wire fraud.

After a 10-week trial in early 2023, a federal jury convicted Shah, Agarwal, and Purdy on multiple counts of mail fraud, wire fraud, and bank fraud. In 2024, Rishi Shah was sentenced to 7 years and 6 months in federal prison, followed by 3 years of supervised release. Shradha Agarwal was sentenced to 3 years in a halfway house. While Brad Purdy was sentenced to 2 years and 3 months in prison. Ashik Desai was sentenced to seven months in prison, and Kathryn Choi received three years of probation.

In sentencing, U.S. District Judge Thomas Durkin stated the scheme was "driven by greed" and calculated the loss to pharmaceutical clients at approximately $23.3 million. The judge noted that the often-cited "$1 billion fraud" figure referred to the amount of financing fraudulently obtained, not the amount lost by investors.

== Company restructuring and civil settlement ==
In the wake of the fraud's exposure, the company underwent significant restructuring. As part of a January 2018 civil settlement with investors, including Goldman Sachs and a venture fund founded by Governor J.B. Pritzker—Shah and Agarwal stepped down from day-to-day management and paid a settlement of $159 million to reduce company debt.

The company installed a new board of directors and later merged with a competitor, eventually rebranding under the name PatientPoint.
