= Darien, Illinois =

- City
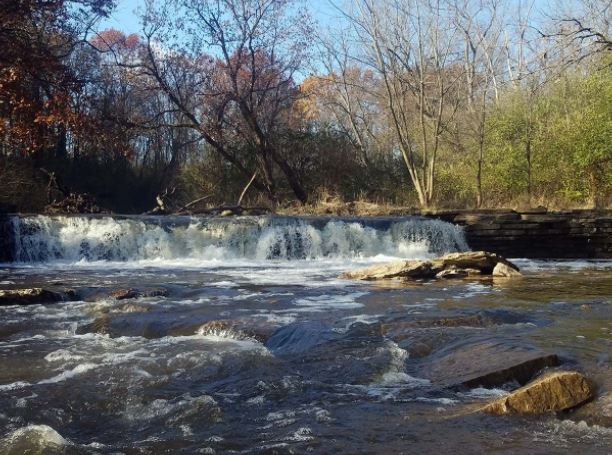
- Rocky Glen Falls

- Flag
- Motto: "A Nice Place to Live"
- Location of Darien in DuPage County, Illinois.
- Coordinates: 41°44′44″N 87°58′52″W
- Country: United States
- State: Illinois
- County: DuPage
- Township: Downers Grove
- Incorporated: 1969

Government
  - Type: Council–manager
  - Mayor: Joseph Marchese

Area
  - Total: 6.28 sq mi (16.27 km^{2})
  - Land: 6.17 sq mi (15.98 km^{2})
  - Water: 0.11 sq mi (0.29 km^{2}) 1.90%
- Elevation: 751 ft (229 m)

Population (2020)
  - Total: 22,011
  - Density: 3,567.1/sq mi (1,377.25/km^{2})

Standard of living
  - Per capita income: $39,795 (median: $89,836)
  - Home value: $231,382 (median: $214,500 (2000))
- ZIP code(s): 60561, 60596
- Area code(s): 630 and 331
- Geocode: 17-18628
- FIPS code: 17-18628
- GNIS feature ID: 2393720
- Website: www.darien.il.us

Darien (formerly Cass) is a city in DuPage County, Illinois, United States. Per the 2020 census, the population was 22,011. A southwestern suburb of Chicago, Darien was named after the town of Darien, Connecticut. Darien is just north of I-55 and Historic U.S. Route 66 (now Frontage Road). The entire south edge of the town borders Waterfall Glen.

== History ==
The first people to settle in Darien came from New England via the Erie Canal and Great Lakes. Among the first to arrive was Thomas Andrus, the Rapones, and the Capra family. They settled along an old stagecoach line in 1835. Thomas Andrus served as the first postmaster, the first Justice of the Peace, a county commissioner, and county assessor. The Andrus farmhouse also operated as an inn and tavern to accommodate travelers from the Frink and Walker Stagecoach line according to the Darien Historical Society. Mr. Capra was the Dog Catcher, and also established the Capra Inn, near what is currently the intersection of Lemont Road and I-55; the inn served the 15 stagecoaches that traveled the stagecoach line, and included a tavern and a post office. Andrus named the area "Cass".

Andrus and Father Beggs along with Louis Capra Sr. built the First Cass Church, which was a log cabin. The church was also used as a school house.

Elisha and Eliza Smart settled in Cass in 1838 with their ten children. Elisha joined the Gold Rush and went to California, returning seven years later a very rich man. He bought more land and donated it for the construction of a new Cass Church in 1870. His brother, William Smart, donated land for the creation of Cass Cemetery.

John and Hannah Oldfield came to Cass in 1850. Mr. Oldfield raised cattle and increased his land holdings to 2,000 acres (8.1 km^{2}).

In 1881, a man named Franklin Blanchard opened a cheese factory. The factory was eventually moved or closed; a McDonald's restaurant now occupies the factory's original location.

Martin B. Madden arrived with his parents in the Cass area in 1869 from England. In 1878 he married the youngest daughter of Elisha and Eliza Smart at her parents' house in Cass. In 1903, Mr. Madden built a home to look like the White House in Washington D.C. he called it Castle Eden. Today Castle Eden is part of the Aylesford Retreat Center of the Carmelite Fathers. In July of 2026, the Carmelites announced that the will be demolishing Castle Eden. https://patch.com/illinois/darien-il/darien-religious-building-be-torn-down-city

A group of German Lutherans from Europe came to the area near 67th and Clarendon Hills Road in 1859. They built the first St. John Lutheran Church and laid out the cemetery behind the church. Today the cemetery is still located at 67th and Clarendon Hills Road. In 1899, a new church was built on the northeast corner of Cass Avenue and 75th Street. In 1969, the second church was torn down and the present St. John's Lutheran Church was built by Louis Capra Jr., west of Cass Ave and north of 75th Street.

A school was built on the northwest corner of Cass and 75th street in 1860. It was the first Lace School. It burned down in 1924, and was replaced with the present building. It is now a museum which is open on the first Sunday of each month from 2:00pm to 4:00pm.

By 1890, the Village of Lace was established. The important location at that time was the triangle bordered by Cass Avenue, Plainfield Road and 75th Street. It was called "The Point". The Point included the Town Hall, General Store, the Capra Blacksmith Shop and the office of Dr. Roe. A Post Office had been established by the Rapones at The Point in 1884.

The future city of Darien was originally part of the Lace and Cass communities. As nearby Downers Grove began to expand in the 1960s, its city street grid began to extend into unincorporated areas past its southern borders. Residents of the Marion Hills, Brookhaven, Farmingdale and Hinsbrook subdivisions wanted to incorporate as a single city; this finally happened in 1969. When the incorporation committee reached an impasse on an acceptable name for the new city, acting mayor Sam Kelly suggested the name "Darien". He had visited Darien, Connecticut, and found it to be a very pleasant and attractive community. Today, Darien is known as "A Nice Place to Live", in honor of the city's founding year of 1969. Darien in Illinois is pronounced with the accent on the first syllable; Darien in Connecticut is pronounced with the accent on the last syllable.

On June 20, 2021, a large, violent EF3 tornado tore through several neighborhoods of Woodridge, and then into Darien. The tornado first formed in southern Naperville, causing 6 injuries, and 2 in critical condition. After the tornado crossed IL 53, it entered Woodridge, on top of 83rd St. The tornado at this point was nearing peak width, at or near 1/4 to 1/2 mile wide. The tornado then crossed I-355, and reached peak strength not too long later. The tornado reached a peak size of 0.25 – 0.5 miles wide with a debris ball around 2 miles wide. The tornado at this point was starting to enter Darien, causing even more damage there. The tornado crossed I-55 near the IL 83 interchange not too long later. At around 11:35pm, the tornado roped out in the southwest Chicago suburb of Willow Springs.It caused severe damage to several homes, specifically homes on Lemont Rd.

== Geography ==
According to the 2021 census gazetteer files, Darien has a total area of 6.28 square miles (16.27 km^{2}), of which 6.17 square miles (15.98 km^{2}) (or 98.22%) is land and 0.11 square miles (0.28 km^{2}) (or 1.78%) is water.

Darien's City Hall used to be totally underground until 1994, when it was lifted up. Now only 75% is underground. Darien's City Hall is surrounded on three sides by the village of Downers Grove.

The entire south edge of Darien backs up to Waterfall Glen Forest Preserve, which is home to one of the only old-growth, pine wood forests in the area. It also offers a 773-acre "Bluff savanna", with hiking trails, horseback trails and boat access to the nearby Des Plaines River. The Rocky Glen Waterfall, located within the preserve, is a popular swimming destination in the summer. Darien is bordered by the cities of Downers Grove, Westmont, Woodridge, Lemont, and Willowbrook, and it has easy access to the three major thoroughfares crossing Chicago's southwest suburbs: Interstate 55, Interstate 355, and Interstate 294.

== Demographics ==
Historical population
Census	Pop.	Note	%±
1970	7,789		—
1980	14,956		92.0%
1990	18,341		22.6%
2000	22,860		24.6%
2010	22,086		−3.4%
2020	22,011		−0.3%
U.S. Decennial Census; 2010 2020

=== Racial and ethnic composition ===
Darien city, Illinois – Racial and ethnic composition Note: the US Census treats Hispanic/Latino as an ethnic category. This table excludes Latinos from the racial categories and assigns them to a separate category. Hispanics/Latinos may be of any race.
Race / Ethnicity (NH = Non-Hispanic)	Pop 2000	Pop 2010	Pop 2020	% 2000	% 2010	% 2020
White alone (NH)	18,673	17,063	15,882	81.68%	77.26%	72.15%
Black or African American alone (NH)	437	695	738	1.91%	3.15%	3.35%
Native American or Alaska Native alone (NH)	25	15	4	0.11%	0.07%	0.02%
Asian alone (NH)	2,631	2,603	2,855	11.51%	11.79%	12.97%
Pacific Islander alone (NH)	6	4	15	0.03%	0.02%	0.07%
Other race alone (NH)	21	21	70	0.09%	0.10%	0.32%
Mixed race or Multiracial (NH)	236	299	597	1.03%	1.35%	2.71%
Hispanic or Latino (any race)	831	1,386	1,850	3.64%	6.28%	8.40%
Total	22,860	22,086	22,011	100.00%	100.00%	100.00%

=== 2020 census ===
As of the 2020 census, Darien had a population of 22,011. The population density was 3,503.26 inhabitants per square mile (1,352.62/km^{2}). The median age was 47.7 years. 18.4% of residents were under the age of 18 and 24.4% of residents were 65 years of age or older. For every 100 females there were 93.2 males, and for every 100 females age 18 and over there were 89.8 males age 18 and over.

100.0% of residents lived in urban areas, while 0.0% lived in rural areas.

There were 8,994 households in Darien, including 6,297 families; 24.8% had children under the age of 18 living in them. Of all households, 56.0% were married-couple households, 14.2% were households with a male householder and no spouse or partner present, and 25.7% were households with a female householder and no spouse or partner present. About 26.1% of all households were made up of individuals and 13.6% had someone living alone who was 65 years of age or older.

There were 9,368 housing units, of which 4.0% were vacant; the average density was 1,491.01 per square mile (575.68/km^{2}). The homeowner vacancy rate was 0.8% and the rental vacancy rate was 4.0%.

Racial composition as of the 2020 census
Race	Number	Percent
White	16,350	74.3%
Black or African American	749	3.4%
American Indian and Alaska Native	50	0.2%
Asian	2,881	13.1%
Native Hawaiian and Other Pacific Islander	15	0.1%
Some other race	525	2.4%
Two or more races	1,441	6.5%
Hispanic or Latino (of any race)	1,850	8.4%

=== Income ===
The median income for a household in the city was $100,771, and the median income for a family was $113,415. Males had a median income of $59,394 versus $44,771 for females. The per capita income for the city was $49,892. About 3.8% of families and 5.0% of the population were below the poverty line, including 7.4% of those under age 18 and 6.0% of those age 65 or over.

== Education ==
Hinsdale Township High School District 86 operates Hinsdale South High School in Darien. Part of Darien also attends Downers Grove South High School. Eisenhower Junior High School and Cass Junior High School operate in Darien along with Lace Elementary School, Mark-DeLay Elementary School, Concord Elementary School, and Elizabeth Ide Elementary School.

Local Private Schools include Kingswood Academy (prior to eighth grade). Our Lady of Peace Catholic School closed in 2020 due to low enrollment and financial challenges.

== Transportation ==
Pace provides bus service on Route 715 connecting Darien to Westmont and other destinations.

== Notable people ==
- Rudy Fratto (born 1943), alleged high-ranking member of the Chicago Outfit
- Doug Lussenhop (born 1973), musician, video editor, and comedian associated with comedy duo Tim & Eric
- Manu Raju, journalist
- Barbara Alyn Woods (born 1962), actress from One Tree Hill and Honey, I Shrunk the Kids

== See also ==
- Darien Sportsplex Ice Arena
- National Shrine of St Therese
