= Theater in Chicago =

Theater performed in Chicago, Illinois

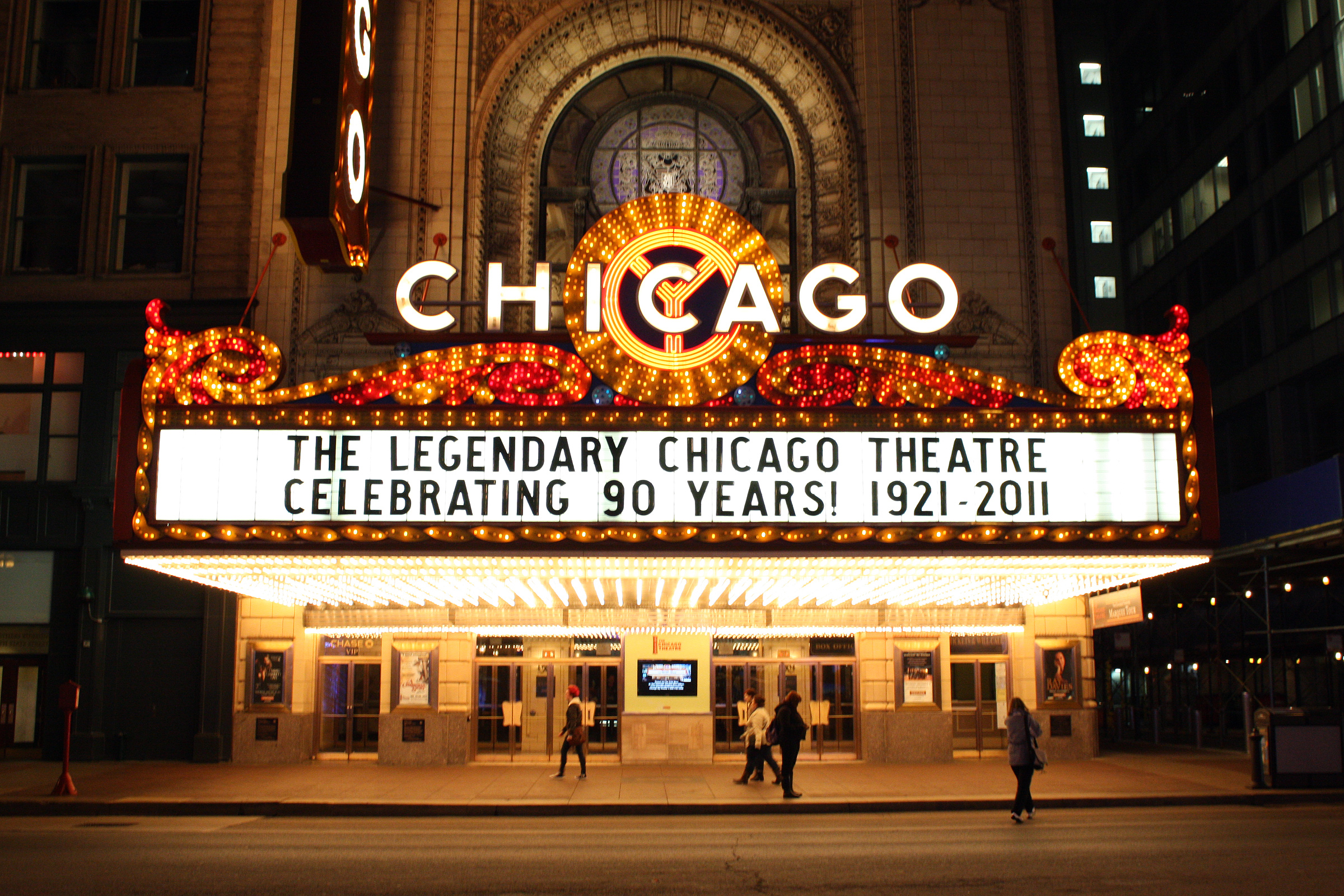
The Chicago Theatre

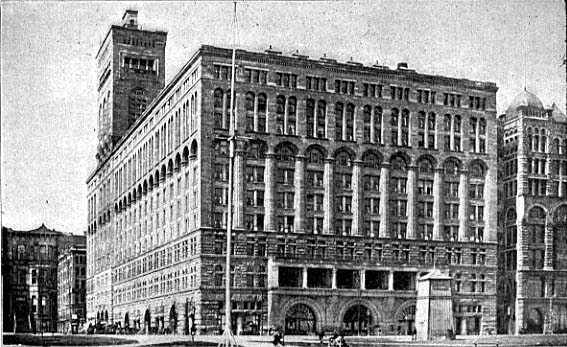
The Auditorium Theatre

Theater in Chicago describes not only theater performed in Chicago, Illinois, but also to the movement in Chicago that saw a number of small, meagerly funded companies grow to institutions of national and international significance. Chicago had long been a popular destination for touring productions, as well as original productions that transfer to Broadway and other cities. According to Variety editor Gordon Cox, beside New York City, Chicago has one of the most lively theater scenes in the United States. As many as 100 shows could be seen any given night from 200 companies as of 2018, some with national reputations and many in creative "storefront" theaters, demonstrating a vibrant theater scene "from the ground up". According to American Theatre magazine, Chicago's theater is "justly legendary".

== History ==
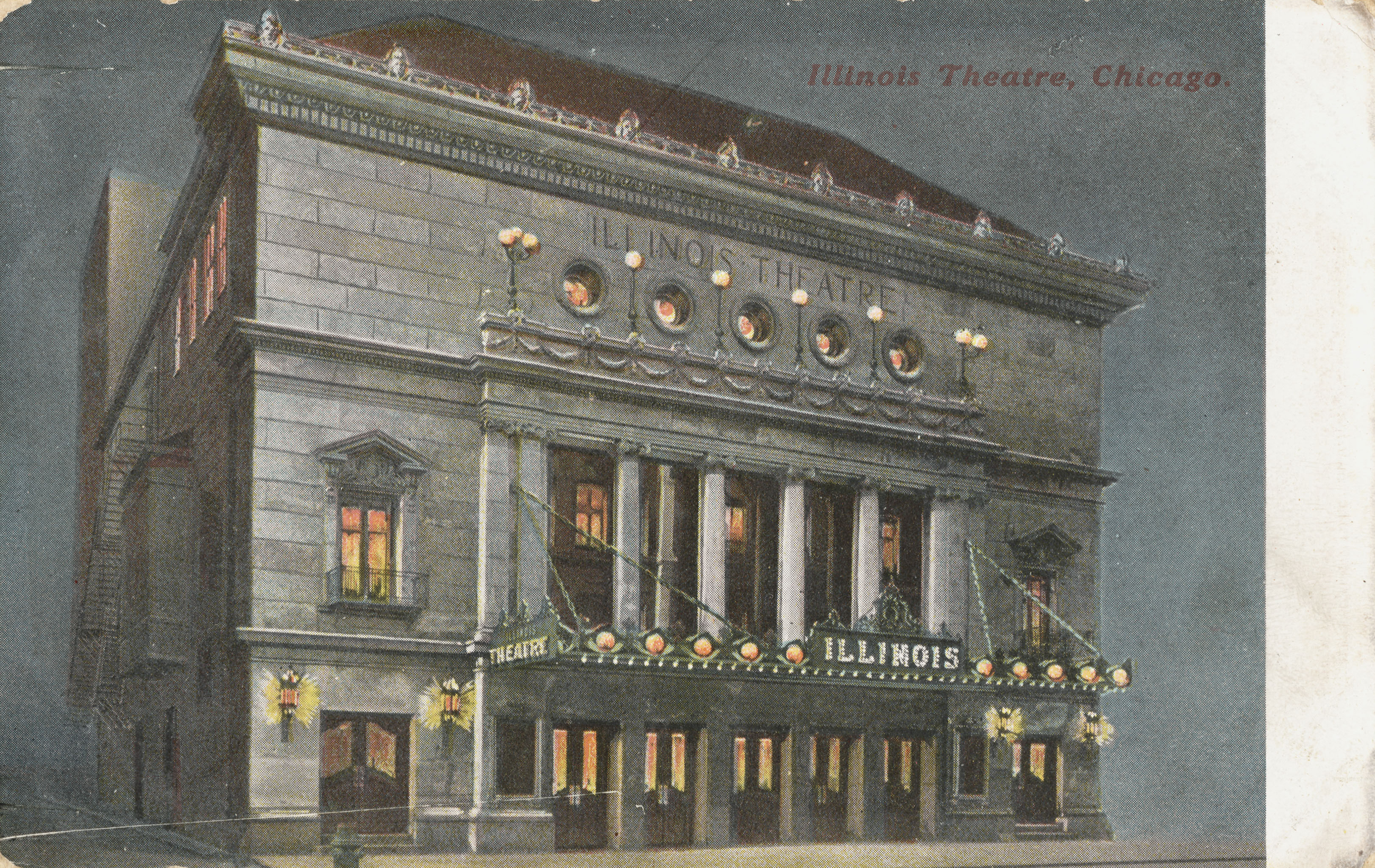
Illinois Theatre, Chicago, Illinois, c.1909

The young settlement of Chicago in 1834 saw its first commercial production by a fire eater and ventriloquist, Mr. Brown. In 1837, the first resident theater company, the short-lived Chicago Theater, opened in the Sauganash Hotel. One of the players was then a boy named Joseph Jefferson, who grew to become a very successful comedic actor. Chicago's main theater prize, the Joseph Jefferson award, is named after this pioneer. New theaters, including Rice's Theater, owned by John Blake Rice, a future mayor, and McVicker's Theater began booking nationally prominent acts beginning in the late 1840s. After the devastation of the Great Chicago Fire of 1871, Scottish-American producer David Henderson gave Chicago a national theater reputation at his Opera House and other theaters. Lively foreign-language theaters patronised by new immigrants also sprang up.

Hull House, the social settlement house of Chicago, had from the 1890s a theatre program under Laura Dainty Pelham which performed the Chicago premiers of numerous of the new plays of Galsworthy, Ibsen, and George Bernard Shaw. In 1912, Ellen Van Volkenburg and Maurice Browne founded the Chicago Little Theatre, crediting Pelham's Hull House influence. This, along with the founding of the Toy Theatre in Boston the same year, is credited with starting the American Little Theatre Movement. A postwar stage renaissance emerged via the Hull House through efforts by Viola Spolin and Robert Sickinger. From this an indigenous Chicago style of ensemble theater arose, with examples including The Second City, Steppenwolf Theatre Company, St. Nicholas Theatre Company (founded by playwright David Mamet and actor William H. Macy) and The Goodman Theatre.

The Second City, founded in 1959 by Paul Sills and Bernie Sahlins, is the country's premiere improvisational theater, and its method of developing material has strongly influenced such playwrights as David Mamet (who was a dishwasher there), Jules Feiffer, Lanford Wilson, Jeffrey Sweet, James Sherman, David Auburn, Mark Hollmann, Greg Kotis and Alan Gross. In 1968 Paul Sills left Second City to open The Body Politic Theater where he created Story Theater. The Kingston Mines Theater, where the musical Grease premiered, began shortly afterwards, the two theaters across the street from each other on Lincoln Avenue. In 1970 Sills invited Stuart Gordon and his Organic Theater Company to move to Chicago and begin what he termed "a scene." The success of these three theaters inspired the creation of other small troupes that grew, notably the Steppenwolf Theatre and the Victory Gardens Theater, both of which, along with the Goodman Theatre, Chicago Shakespeare Theatre, Court Theatre (Chicago) and Lookingglass Theatre Company, were honored with regional theater Tony Awards, the only city in the country to have six theaters so honored.

The Goodman Theatre had existed for a number of years with a reputation as a home for revivals, but the arrival of artistic director William Woodman and his assistant Gregory Mosher changed its profile. When Mosher took over as artistic director he enhanced the Goodman's reputation largely due to the work of David Mamet whose play Sexual Perversity in Chicago had been Mamet's first success at the Organic Theater Company in 1974. Mosher later produced and directed American Buffalo and Glengarry Glen Ross at the Goodman. The Goodman Theatre also was where Hurlyburly by David Rabe premiered under the direction of Chicago improvisational theater alum Mike Nichols.

After Mosher moved to New York, the artistic directorship went to Robert Falls, former director of the Wisdom Bridge Theatre. Falls is particularly known for his ongoing collaboration with actor Brian Dennehy, including productions of Death of a Salesman and Long Day's Journey Into Night that went to Broadway and won Tony Awards for both of them.

Briefly, The Goodman Theatre is known as the house of directors; Steppenwolf Theatre is known as the house of actors, Victory Gardens Theater as the house of writers; The Second City as the house of improvisation, and Organic Theater Company and later Lookingglass Theatre Company as the home of original image-based productions. Several leading directors associated with these troupes -- Dennis Zacek, Mary Zimmerman and Frank Galati—are alumni of Northwestern University in Evanston, Illinois, just north of Chicago. In addition, writers such as Richard Christiansen of the Chicago Daily News and later the Chicago Tribune, Newcity's senior editor Nate Lee and Hedy Weiss of the Chicago Sun-Times helped encourage Chicagoans to come out and appreciate live theater.

Since 1990, Performink has been an industry newspaper for Chicago theater, including show openings and reviews, audition listings, and industry and union news for Chicago actors, directors, dancers, designers, and other theater professionals.

The Drury Lane Theatres were a group of six theaters in the Chicago suburbs founded by Tony DeSantis. He began producing plays in 1949 in a tent adjacent to his Martinique Restaurant to attract customers, then built his first theater in 1958.

== Today ==
Chicago is home to more than 200 small theatre companies such as A Red Orchid Theatre, Lifeline Theatre, Remy Bumppo Theatre Company, Redtwist Theater, Trap Door Theatre, The Conspirators and TUTA Theatre. Some have their own performance venues, while many perform in untraditional theatre spaces such as storefronts or bars, or any number of studio or black box theatres around Chicago.

Many of Chicago's larger theaters both profit and non-profit originate or tryout shows for Broadway. Touring productions also visit the city regularly, mainly playing at the big theaters in the Chicago Theatre District in the Loop.

Following in the tradition of The Second City and Steppenwolf, many of these companies, including American Blues Theater, Stage Left Theatre, The Factory Theater, Organic Theater Company, Strawdog Theatre Company and Lifeline Theatre, are ensemble-based. An ensemble-based company is formed of a group of artists (actors, directors, designers, playwrights, etc.) who work collaboratively to create each production.

Chicago theater has a long record of introducing new plays and playwrights. Many of the theaters in Chicago have new play workshop programs to cultivate work from current playwrights. Chicago Dramatists, which was begun by a group of ex-students of a playwriting workshop at Victory Gardens Theater, has an ongoing program of developing new writers, most notably Rebecca Gilman.

The Victory Gardens Theater plays host to a dozen resident playwrights and most of the productions there are premieres of their plays, a number of which have gone on to productions elsewhere. Some of these include James Sherman's Beau Jest, Jeffrey Sweet's The Action Against Sol Schumann, Kristine Thatcher's Voice of Good Hope, Charles Smith's Jelly Belly, Steve Carter's Pecong, Claudia Allen's Deed of Trust, and Douglas Post's Earth and Sky.

Stage Left Theatre's Downstage Left program has cultivated nationally known playwrights Mia McCullough, David Rush, Margaret Lewis and David Alan Moore.

Theatre Building Chicago formerly had an ongoing program for the development of new musicals until being taken over by Stage 773 in 2010.

Chicago dell'Arte is local company currently creating and producing new works of Commedia dell'arte. The company also sponsors and in-house troupe known as Le Corone Rosse.

Polish language productions for Chicago's large Polish speaking population can be seen at the historic Gateway Theatre in Jefferson Park.

Oracle Theatre offers public access theater in Chicago sustained by the donations, where the seats are free and open to anyone.

Chicago is home to both non-union and union theater companies. Union shows adhere to strict contracts for all artists involved. Artistic trade unions such as Actors' Equity, commonly known simply as "Equity," and the Stage Directors and Choreographers Society bargain for contracts guaranteeing minimum wages and other rights involved with the rehearsal and production process. Shows may run for a varying number of weeks, depending on ticket sales. Musicals tend to have longer runs than do stage plays. The majority of theaters in Chicago are located on the city's North Side and in the Loop.

Both Actor's Equity and non-Equity productions in the Chicago area receive honors from the Joseph Jefferson (Jeff) Awards, awarded by a panel of volunteer judges.

== See also ==
- List of theaters in Chicago
