= Francis Guinan =

American actor

Francis V. Guinan Jr. (born November 17, 1951) is an American film, television and stage actor who is perhaps best known for his role as Edgar Teller the patriarch in the short-lived series Eerie, Indiana.

The Council Bluffs, Iowa-born actor has made guest appearances in many notable television series including: Grey's Anatomy, CSI: Miami, Law & Order, CSI: NY, Without a Trace, The Practice, Crossing Jordan, Star Trek: Enterprise, Star Trek: Voyager, That '70s Show, Nash Bridges, Sliders, Murder, She Wrote, Frasier, Mike & Molly and other series.

He has been a member of the Steppenwolf Theatre Company ensemble since 1979. In December 2007, Guinan co-starred in the Tracy Letts' play August: Osage County which opened on Broadway to critical acclaim. He played Master Pakku in the 2010 film, The Last Airbender as well as appeared in the films Hannibal (2001), Constantine (2005) and Abundant Acreage Available (2017).

== Selected filmography ==
- 1988: The Serpent and the Rainbow as American Doctor
- 1988: Miles from Home as Tommy Malin
- 1992: Rock Hudson as Carl
- 1992: Shining Through as Andrew Berringer
- 1997: Speed 2: Cruise Control as Rupert
- 1999: Guinevere as Alan Sloane
- 2001: Hannibal as FBI Assistant Director Noonan
- 2005: Constantine as Father Garret
- 2010: The Last Airbender as Master Pakku
- 2010: All Good Things as Daniel Patrick Moynihan
- 2013: Killing Kennedy as Lyndon B. Johnson
- 2015: Henry Gamble's Birthday Party as Larry Montgomery
- 2017: The Evil Within as Dr. Preston
- 2017: Abundant Acreage Available as Tom
- 2019: Saint Frances as Dennis
- 2022: Relative as David Frank
- 2024: Ghostlight as Janitor Fran

== Awards and nominations ==
=== Theatre ===
Year	Award	Category	Work	Result
1986	Joseph Jefferson Awards	Actor in a Principal Role - Play	A Lesson from Aloes (Steppenwolf Theatre Company)	Nominated
1988	Joseph Jefferson Awards	Actor in a Principal Role - Play	Little Egypt (Steppenwolf Theatre Company)	Nominated
2010	Joseph Jefferson Awards	Actor in a Principal Role - Play	A Guide for the Perplexed (Victory Gardens Theater)	Won
2011	Joseph Jefferson Awards	Actor in a Principal Role - Play	Rantoul and Die (American Blues Theater)	Nominated
2015	Joseph Jefferson Awards	Actor in a Principal Role - Play	White Guy on the Bus (Northlight Theatre)	Nominated
2015	Joseph Jefferson Awards	Actor in a Principal Role - Play	The Night Alive (Steppenwolf Theatre Company)	Nominated
2019	Evening Standard Theatre Award	Best Actor	Downstate	Nominated

=== Film ===
Year	Award	Category	Work	Result
2022	Festival of Cinema NYC Jury Award	Best Ensemble Cast	Relative	Won
2022	Midwest Film Festival	Best Actor	Relative	Won
