= Chicago High School for the Arts =

Art high school in Chicago, Illinois

Coordinates: 41°53′58″N 87°41′41″W

Chicago High School of the Arts (ChiArts)

Location
- 2714 W. Augusta Blvd; Chicago, Illinois 60622; United States

Information
- Type: Public, Secondary, Contract
- Motto: "For the arts + minds of Chicago."
- Established: 2009
- School district: Chicago Public Schools
- Principal: Wayne Williams
- Grades: 9–12
- Gender: Coed
- Enrollment: 572 (2015–16)
- Campus: Urban
- Website: www.chicagoarts.cps.edu

Chicago High School for the Arts (ChiArts) is the former name of a public four–year college preparatory visual and performing arts high school located in the West Town community area, in Chicago, Illinois, United States. Currently operated by the Chicago Public Schools district as the Chicago Arts High School, the school opened for the 2009–10 school year.

== History ==
ChiArts curriculum is combined with intensive training in the performing and visual arts. A public high school open to all Chicago residents, ChiArts opened in the fall of 2009 with 150 freshmen divided among four arts areas: Dance, Music—Instrumental and Vocal, Theatre—divided into Acting and Musical Theatre, and Visual Arts. The program has added a fifth conservatory in 2014, Creative Writing. ChiArts was previously located at the Douglas school campus for 2009–10 and 2010–11 school years, where ChiArts shared the campus with John J. Pershing West Middle School. It shared the Doolittle West space at 521 East 35th Street in Bronzeville and the third floor with the James R. Doolittle Jr. Elementary School next door from 2011 to 2014.

Over the summer of 2014, it moved to its permanent home located at 2714 W. Augusta Blvd, in the Ukrainian Village and Community. It was scheduled to be in the former Lafayette School, which CPS closed since the number of students was too low.

== Program ==
Students participate in a rigorous program of academics and arts education where they are in school from 8 am until 4 pm, with three of the last hours dedicated to the Arts each child joined.

== Admission ==
Entrance into the school is through a competitive audition and application process. Students may audition for dance (novice and advanced), theatre (acting, musical theatre), visual arts, music (instrumental and voice), and creative writing.

== Partnerships ==
Numerous community arts programs, professional arts organizations and institutions of higher learning that specialize in the arts have come forward to join with ChiArts in making this type of educational experience available to Chicago residents through the public school system. Arts Partners include: Actors Gymnasium, Albany Park Theatre Project, American Theatre Company, About Face Theatre, Art Institute of Chicago, Art Resources in Teaching, Auditorium Theatre, Black Ensemble Theater, Chicago Arts Partnership in Education (CAPE), Chicago Chamber Musicians, Chicago Children's Choir, Chicago College of Performing Arts/Roosevelt University, Chicago Multicultural Dance Center, Chicago Sinfonietta, Chicago Shakespeare Theater, Chicago Symphony Orchestra, Chicago Youth Symphony Orchestras, Columbia College Chicago, Congo Square Theatre Company, Dance Works Chicago, DuSable Museum, Ensemble Español Center for Spanish Dance and Music, e Creative Arts Foundation, Goodman Theatre, Harris Theater, The House Theatre of Chicago, Hubbard Street Dance Chicago, Hyde Park Art Center, Hyde Park School of Dance, Hyde Park Suzuki Institute, Joel Hall Dancers & Center, Joffrey Ballet, Lifeline Theatre, Lookingglass Theatre, Lou Conte Dance Studio, Lyric Opera of Chicago, Marwen, Merit School of Music, Midwest Young Artists, Muntu Dance Theatre, Music Institute of Chicago, Music of the Baroque, National Museum of Mexican Art, Natya Dance Theatre, Pegasus Players, People's Music School, Piven Theatre Workshop, Puerto Rican Arts Alliance, Ravinia Festival, Redmoon Theater, Remy Bumppo Theatre Company, River North Chicago Dance Company, Rock for Kids, Ruth Page Foundation, Sherwood Conservatory, Sones de Mexico Ensemble, Steppenwolf Theatre, The Theatre School at DePaul University, Thelonious Monk Institute, Urban Gateways, UIC- College of Architecture and the Arts, UIC- College of Education, VanderCook College of Music, Victory Gardens Theater

== Associations ==
ChiArts is a member of the following organizations: National Guild of Community Arts Education, Arts Schools NETWORK, Illinois Arts Alliance

== See also ==
- Magnet school
