= Thom Cox =

American actor

Thom Cox (born Thomas J. Cox) is an American theatrical producer and co-founder of the Lookingglass Theatre Company.

== Education ==
Cox went to Northwestern University, where he met David Schwimmer along with six others who then went on to found Lookingglass Theatre Company in Chicago, Illinois.

== Career ==
Cox has worked on more than forty productions, including West, The Jungle, The Odyssey, Arabian Nights, The Master and Margarita, They All Fall Down, Summertime, Great Men of Science, as Algren (Joseph Jefferson Awards nomination) in Nelson Algren: For Keeps and a Single Day, (which went on to be adapted for television in an Emmy-nominated co-production with WTTW), as Winston in 1984, as Quilp in The Old Curiosity Shop (Joseph Jefferson nomination), as Hook in Peter Pan: a play, Our Town, Black Diamond, Lookingglass Alice, Big Lake, Big City, and 20,000 Leagues Under the Sea. He served as Lookingglass' Education and Community Program's Master Teacher for over ten years, from 2007–2018. In other regional theatre, Cox has appeared at the Illinois Theatre Center, Victory Gardens, Northlight Theatre Company, The Court Theatre (Chicago), Steppenwolf Theatre, Milwaukee Rep, Writers Theatre and Goodman Theatre, where he has played Bob Cratchit in the Goodman's annual production of A Christmas Carol. He has directed for Eclipse Theatre Company, Piven Theatre Workshop, and his own Joseph Jefferson-nominated adaptation of The Scarlet Letter for Lookingglass. During the summers, he and his wife, the stage manager Chris Freeburg, have worked at the Weston Playhouse Theatre Company in Vermont, where he has appeared in productions ranging from Chicago, Oklahoma!, and Urinetown, to Tartuffe, and Blithe Spirit.

Additionally, for the Playhouse, Cox served as co-director of their Young Company, in which capacity he directed two musical productions. He has also taught at Northwestern University and the University of Illinois at Chicago as an adjunct faculty member. Cox's film and television acting credits include: Since You've Been Gone (Miramax), Chi-Girl, and Brotherhood (Showtime) Chicago Fire (NBC).

== Personal life ==
Thom lives in Chicago with his wife Christine D. Freeburg. They have an 18 year old daughter, Joan.
