= Relative (film) =

2022 film, directed by Michael Glover Smith

- Theatrical release poster
- Directed by: Michael Glover Smith
- Written by: Michael Glover Smith
- Produced by: Aaron Wertheimer; Clare Cooney
- Starring: Wendy Robie; Francis Guinan; Cameron Scott Roberts; Clare Cooney; Keith D. Gallagher; Emily Lape; Melissa DuPrey; Elizabeth Stam
- Cinematography: Olivia Aquilina
- Edited by: Eric Marsh
- Distributed by: Newcity/Chicago Film Project (theatrical) / Music Box Films (streaming)
- Release date: March 12, 2022 (Gasparilla International Film Festival)
- Running time: 97 minutes
- Country: United States
- Language: English
- Box office: $23,168

Relative is a 2022 American drama/comedy feature film written and directed by Michael Glover Smith. The film is about a family reunion centered on a college graduation party in Chicago. It premiered at the 2022 Gasparilla International Film Festival in Tampa, Florida where actor Cameron Scott Roberts won the Grand Jury award for Best Performance.

== Plot ==
Karen Frank and her husband, David, are retirement-age progressive activists who have lived in the same Victorian home in Chicago's Rogers Park neighborhood for 30 years. It's the house in which their four children grew up and where two of their children, adult sons Benji and Rod, still live. On the eve of Benji's graduation from college, daughters Evonne and Norma return home from out-of-state for a weekend celebration. Evonne brings her daughter, Emma, and newly separated wife, Lucia; Norma arrives alone, with thoughts of wasted potential as she reconsiders her suburban life; Rod, an unemployed burnout, pines for Sarah, the “cam girl” ex who left him years ago; and all Benji wants to do is escape the party to rendezvous with Hekla, a free-spirited actress he met the night prior. As David and Karen announce the potential sale of their home, each member of the Frank family finds their bonds with the others being tested – and strengthened – in surprising ways.

== Cast ==
- Wendy Robie as Karen Frank
- Francis Guinan as David Frank
- Cameron Scott Roberts as Benji Frank
- Clare Cooney as Evonne Frank
- Keith D. Gallagher as Rod Frank
- Emily Lape as Norma Frank
- Melissa DuPrey as Lucia Aguirre
- Elizabeth Stam as Hekla

== Background and production ==
It was announced in 2021 that the film was being produced by Newcity/Chicago Film Project and would star Twin Peaks' Wendy Robie and Steppenwolf Theatre Ensemble member Francis Guinan.

In an interview with Split-Tooth Media, Smith said, "[A]ll of my films are really about love, which is the only subject that interests me". He noted that the inspiration for Relative was to stretch himself as a writer/director by examining, for the first time, familial relationships, which he claimed "are a lot more complicated than the ones you have with a friend or a romantic partner". Smith also cited, as influences, films such as Arnaud Desplechin's A Christmas Tale, Yasujirō Ozu's Late Spring and John Ford's How Green Was My Valley.

Relative was shot over a span of two weeks in the summer of 2021 in Chicago and the near-north suburbs.

== Release ==
The film received a limited theatrical release beginning on June 8, 2022. It was the 23rd highest-grossing movie in the U.S. during its first week in release. It was announced on February 28, 2024 that the film had been acquired by Music Box Films for a streaming release beginning on May 21, 2024.

== Reception ==
Relative has received very positive reviews for its writing, acting, and directing. This includes a three-and-a-half (out of four) star review by the Chicago Sun-Times' Richard Roeper who called it "a wickedly funny, occasionally poignant and authentic-to-its-core drama/comedy about three eventful days in the life of a totally relatable extended family", a three (out of four) star review by RogerEbert.com's Matt Zoller Seitz who compared it to the work of British filmmaker Mike Leigh, and a 7.5/10 star review by Ray Lobo at Film Threat. Matt Fagerholm, writing at Indie Outlook, called it "one of the year's best films". On the review aggregator website Rotten Tomatoes, 100% of 12 critics' reviews are positive, with an average rating of 8.5/10.

== Awards ==
Year	Award	Category	Result
2022	Gasparilla International Film Festival Jury Award	Best Performance (Cameron Scott Roberts)	Won
2022	Festival of Cinema NYC Jury Award	Best Director	Nominated
2022	Festival of Cinema NYC Jury Award	Best Ensemble Cast	Won
2022	Festival of Cinema NYC Jury Award	Best Narrative Feature	Nominated
2022	Full Bloom Film Festival	Best Narrative Feature	Won
2022	Hell's Half Mile Film & Music Festival Jury Award	Best Feature	Nominated
2022	Hell's Half Mile Film & Music Festival Jury Award	Best Screenplay (Drama)	Nominated
2022	Hell's Half Mile Film & Music Festival Jury Award	Best Ensemble Cast	Nominated
2022	Hell's Half Mile Film & Music Festival Jury Award	Best Supporting Performance (Emily Lape)	Nominated
2022	Buffalo International Film Festival Jury Award	Best Narrative Feature	Won
2022	Midwest Film Festival	Best Actor (Francis Guinan)	Won
2023	Beloit International Film Festival	Best Regional Feature	Nominated
