= Midwest Film Festival =

Film festival

The Midwest Film Festival is the USA's only film festival solely dedicated to Midwest films. Only films from the eight-state Midwest region of Illinois, Indiana, Iowa, Michigan, Minnesota, Missouri, Ohio and Wisconsin are considered for screening.

The festival was originally hosted every first Tuesday of the month at Chicago's Landmark Century Centre Cinema but is presently held on the final Monday of the month at the Gene Siskel Film Center. Originally named the Midwest Independent Film Festival in 2004, the festival formally changed its name to the Midwest Film Festival in 2020 in a rebranding strategy spearheaded by festival director Erica Duffy.

== Festival Highlights ==
- The World Premiere of the comedy Osso Bucco, starring Illeana Douglas and Mike Starr opened the 2008 festival
- The Midwest Premiere of Sundance Film Festival doc Wordplay, directed by Patrick Creadon, featuring Will Shortz
- The Midwest Premiere of Cinequest Film Festival Best Documentary winner Indestructible, directed by Ben Byer
- Controversial thriller Death of a President, winner of the International Film Critics Award at the Toronto International Film Festival
- Sundance Film Festival favorite Steel City, written and directed by Alton, IL native Brian Jun, starring Tom Guiry, America Ferrera and Steppenwolf ensemble member Laurie Metcalf
- Acclaimed documentary Rock the Bells, which chronicled the final stage performance of all nine original members of the Wu-Tang Clan, four months before Ol' Dirty Bastard's death.
- The Midwest Premiere of Sugar Mountain, directed by Aaron Himelstein
- The World Premiere of Following Paula, starring Justina Machado
- The Festival Premiere of Dirty Work, directed by Bruce Terris, starring Lance Reddick, Michael McGlone and Austin Pendleton
- The Chicago Premiere of The Godfather of Green Bay, starring Tony Goldwyn, Lauren Holly, Mark Borchardt, Lance Barber and Pete Schwaba, who also wrote and directed the film.
- The Midwest Premiere of Relative, starring Wendy Robie and Francis Guinan in 2022

== History ==
The film festival was founded by Chicago actor Mike McNamara and filmmaker Michael Kwielford in 2004. In November 2017 McNamara stepped down as director "due to personal reasons" and was replaced by Kwielford as interim director. In July 2018, Amy Guth was named the new executive director of the festival. In December 2019, Erica Duffy was named the festival's new executive director.
