= Jeffrey Sweet =

American dramatist

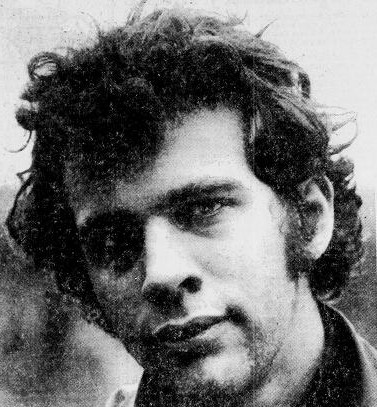
Jeffrey Sweet in 1980

Jeffrey Sweet (born May 3, 1950) is an American playwright, journalist, songwriter, teacher, theater historian and critic, who has also performed off-Broadway and occasionally directed. His recent works include A Change of Position and Kunstler about human rights lawyer William Kunstler.

== Early life and education ==
Sweet grew up in Evanston, Illinois. As a child, he appeared on local television at ages nine and ten before his mother ended his acting career. He entered New York University in 1969 intending to study film, but concentrated increasingly on theatre. While at NYU, he became the drama critic for the student newspaper and took a drama criticism course taught by Clive Barnes. His criticism later led to his admission to the National Critics Institute at the Eugene O'Neill Theater Center.

== Personal life ==
Sweet's father was James Sweet, a science writer for the University of Chicago who aided Supreme Court chief justice Earl Warren in drafting two anti-McCarthy speeches; his mother was violinist Vivian Sweet. He is married to actor-producer-writer, Kristine Niven, a founder of AND Theater Company, a small non-profit company in New York.

== Theatre career ==
Sweet's first professional production came while he was a student at New York University, when the Milwaukee Repertory Theater staged Winging It, his musical comedy loosely adapted from The Birds by Aristophanes. By 1980, he was teaching improvisational techniques associated with The Second City at Victory Gardens Theater, the Goodman Theatre, and Writers Bloc, a New York group of writers and actors that he helped found. In 1996, Sweet opened the inaugural Big Stinkin' International Improv Festival with a presentation on the early history of improvisational theatre featuring rare film and video of the original Second City performers.

Sweet's play Porch marked an early turning point in his career. While serving as literary manager of the off-off-Broadway Encompass Theatre, he arranged a staged reading attended by The New York Times critic Richard Eder, whose favorable review Sweet later described as the beginning of his ability to make a living in theatre. In early 1979, Tom Mula directed a showcase production at Victory Gardens Theater, where its reception led to a main-stage production later that year.

Sweet has been a playwright, screenwriter, lyricist, critic, journalist, teacher, theatre historian, and sometime songwriter and director. He was a resident member of Chicago's Victory Gardens Theater, where thirteen of his plays—including Flyovers, Porch, The Action Against Sol Schumann, The Value of Names, Berlin '45, With and Without, Court-Martial at Fort Devens, Class Dismissed, and Bluff have been produced. He has also performed a solo piece, You Only Shoot the Ones You Love (which premiered in the New York Fringe) and authored Kunstler, a play about William Kunstler, which premiered in 2013 at Hudson Stage Theater and subsequently played the New York Fringe in 2014, off-Broadway in 2017 (at 59E59th Street) and had an extended run at Barrington Stage in Pittsfield, MA in the summer of 2017. In 2024 it was produced in London at the White Bear Theatre. Kunstler was written for actor Jeff McCarthy.

His involvement with musical theatre includes writing the book to a musical version of Murray Schisgal's play Luv with lyrics by Susan Birkenhead and music by Howard Marren. Originally produced off-Broadway under the title Love, it won Outer Critics Circle prizes for best book and best score. It was subsequently revived off-Broadway at the York Theatre in New York, directed by Patricia Birch, under the title What About Luv? and was later produced in London and Tokyo. He also collaborated with Melissa Manchester on a musical called I Sent a Letter to My Love based on the novel by Bernice Rubens. Sweet is also the author of Something Wonderful Right Away (an oral history of Chicago's The Second City troupe), The O'Neill (a book about the Eugene O'Neill Theater Center), The Dramatist's Toolkit and Solving Your Script (two texts on dramatic writing). A book of conversations with leading contemporary playwrights, What Playwrights Talk About When They Talk About Writing, was published in 2017 by Yale University Press.

Sweet's plays are often focused on historical-political subjects. The most produced of the former is The Value of Names, a story set against the backdrop of the aftermath of the blacklist. In this play, a young actress finds herself facing the prospect of working with the director who named her father to HUAC during the McCarthy era. Since its 1983 premiere at the Actors Theatre of Louisville, Names has been revived a number of times, notably in a series of six productions starring Jack Klugman (including one at the Falcon Theatre which was nominated for "best play" in the Ovation Awards of Los Angeles; it was a remounting of the 2006 production directed by James Glossman at the George Street Playhouse in New Brunswick, NJ). Sweet directed a 2025 production at the White Bear Theater in London. An earlier play, American Enterprise, dealt with George Pullman and the 1894 strike that bears his name. It received a Kennedy Center-American Express production grant and was cited by the American Theater Critics Association as one of the three best plays to premiere regionally in the 1990–91 season. The Action Against Sol Schumann was similarly cited by ATCA in the 2000–01 season. Sweet won the 2012 Audelco Award for best playwright for the New York production of Court-Martial at Fort Devens at the New Federal Theater.

Flyovers, which premiered at Victory Gardens in 1998, is a more personal project, and tells the story of a film critic who returns to the small town in Ohio where he grew up and encounters threats he thought he left behind years ago. The original production, directed by Dennis Zacek, starred William Petersen, Amy Morton, Marc Vann and Linda Reiter. Gary Cole and Teddi Sidall took over for Petersen and Morton when the run was extended. The play won a Joseph Jefferson Award for its script, and it was published in Victory Gardens Theater Presents Seven New Plays From the Playwrights Ensemble, an anthology from Northwestern University Press. A showcase production in New York in 2009, produced by Artistic New Directions, 78th Street Theatre Lab and Jeff Landsmann, starred Richard Kind, Michele Pawk, Kevin Geer and Donna Bullock. Northwestern University Press also published an anthology containing nine of his scripts in under the title The Value of Names and Other Plays by Jeffrey Sweet, with a foreword by Chicago Tribune theatre critic emeritus Richard Christiansen.

Sweet has also written for television, as well as radio adaptations of some of his plays. His work for the soap opera One Life to Live resulted in a Writers Guild of America Award for writing for a daytime serial in 1992 and an Emmy nomination. Under the title of "creative consultant," he also co-wrote the adaptation of Hugh Whitemore's Pack of Lies for the Hallmark Hall of Fame. The script, officially credited to the pseudonym Ralph Gallup, was nominated for an Emmy, and the show won a Peabody Award.

Sweet serves as a lifetime member of the Council of the Dramatists Guild, is a member of Ensemble Studio Theatre, and is an alumnus of New Dramatists. For thirty years (until the pandemic) he contributed a regular column to the magazine, Dramatics. He occasionally contributes to the magazine American Theater. He writers a blog on New York theater called ‘’Making the Scene.’’
