= Wendy Robie =

American actress (born 1953)

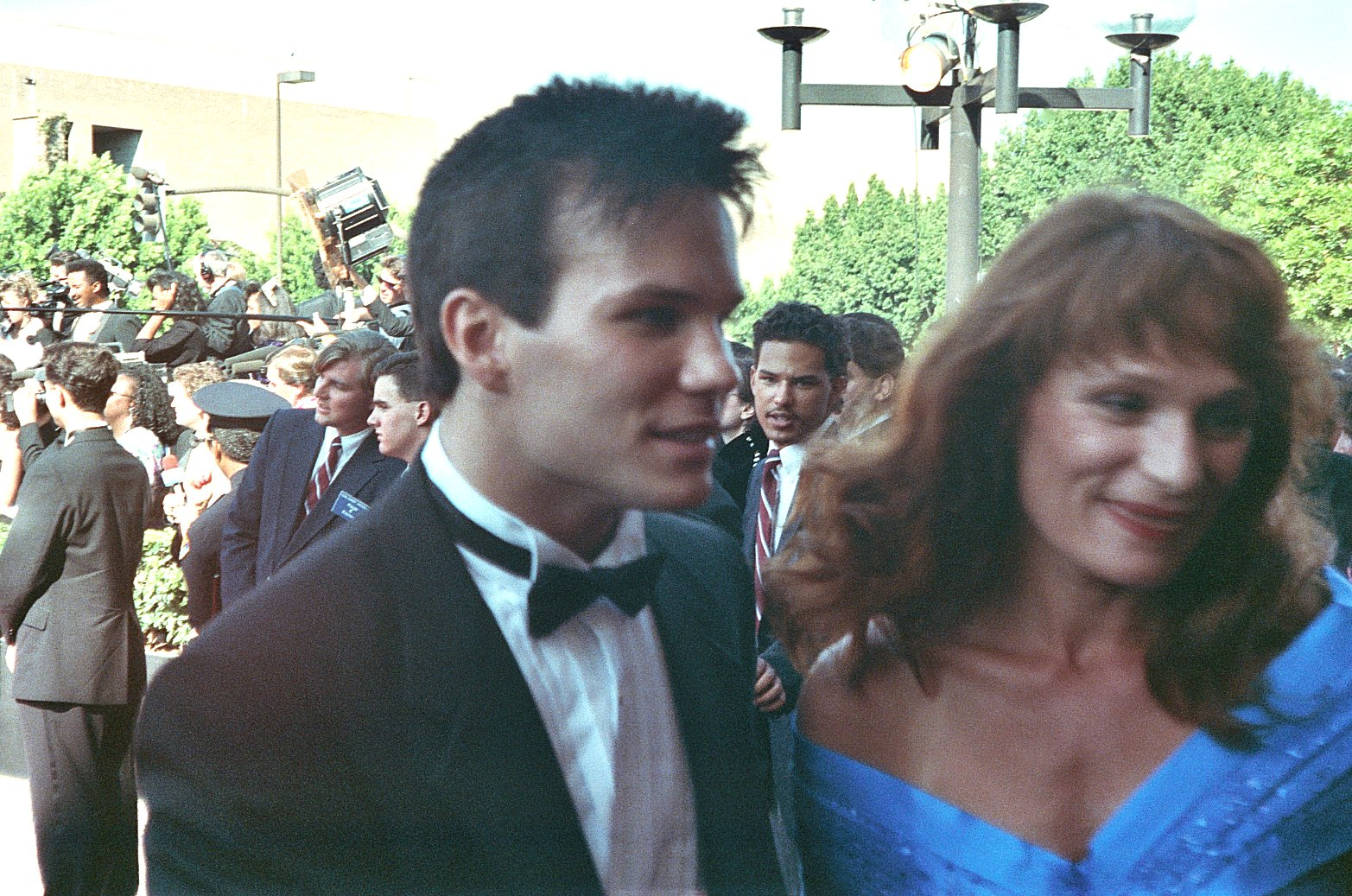
- Wendy Robie (right) with James Marshall at the 1990 Emmy Awards.
- Born: October 6, 1953 (age 72); Cincinnati, Ohio, U.S.
- Occupation: Actress
- Years active: 1990–present
- Children: 1

Wendy Robie (born October 6, 1953) is an American actress. She is best known for her role as Nadine Hurley in David Lynch's television series Twin Peaks (1990–1991). She also starred in two of Wes Craven's films: The People Under the Stairs (1991) and Vampire in Brooklyn (1995). In 2017, Robie reprised her role as Nadine in David Lynch's revival series Twin Peaks: The Return.

== Early life ==
Robie was born in Cincinnati, Ohio, and grew up in northern California on a ranch where Arabian horses were raised. She attended the College of Marin studying theater arts, and later earned a degree in English literature. Robie worked as an English teacher for a decade while raising her daughter, Samantha.

== Career ==
While living in Seattle, Washington and acting in repertory theatre, Robie auditioned for David Lynch's television series Twin Peaks, and was cast as Nadine Hurley; she appeared in 22 episodes of the series between the series' first and second seasons. In 1991, Robie guest starred on an episode of Baywatch and portrayed the villainous Woman in Wes Craven's horror film The People Under The Stairs. In comparing Lynch and Craven, Robie remarked that both were "kind people with wonderful imaginations who work out their views of the darkness in the world through their art."

The following year, Robie reprised her role as Nadine in David Lynch's prequel film Twin Peaks: Fire Walk with Me (1992), although her scene was deleted. The same year, she guest starred on an episode of the television series Quantum Leap. In 1993, Robie starred in the television film Prophet of Evil: The Ervil LeBaron Story.

In 1994, she guest starred in the television series Viper and Ultraman: The Ultimate Hero before appearing in the television film A Place for Annie. In 1995, Robie had a cameo role in Wes Craven's horror comedy film Vampire in Brooklyn. The same year, she had guest roles on the television series Sister, Sister and Star Trek: Deep Space Nine.

In 1996, Robie made her voice-over debut in the video game Zork: Nemesis. The same year, Robie had a guest role on the television series Dark Skies and a supporting role in the film The Glimmer Man. In 1998, she played Bernice in the horror film The Dentist 2, Harriet Davidson in the television series C-16: FBI, and had a supporting role in the film Devil in the Flesh. In 2014, Robie's deleted scene from Fire Walk With Me was included in Lynch's film Twin Peaks: The Missing Pieces. In 2017, Robie reprised her role as Nadine in David Lynch's revival series Twin Peaks: The Return.

== Filmography ==
=== Film ===
Year	Title	Role	Notes	Ref.
1991	The People Under the Stairs	Mrs. Robeson "Mommy"		
1991	Twin Peaks: Fire Walk with Me	Nadine Hurley	Scenes deleted	
1993	Prophet of Evil: The Ervil LeBaron Story		Television film	
1994	A Place for Annie	Dr. Horton	Television film	
1995	Vampire in Brooklyn	Zealot at Police Station		
1996	The Glimmer Man	Melanie Sardes		
1998	Devil in the Flesh	Joyce Saunders		
1998	The Dentist 2	Bernice		
2000	Romeo and Juliet	Prince		
2001	The Attic Expeditions	Dr. Thalama		
2001	Lost Voyage	Mary Burnett	Television film	
2003	Fairies	Ms. Tebbit	Short film	
2008	Were the World Mine	Ms. Tebbit		
2020	Dreaming Grand Avenue	Andromeda		
2022	Relative	Karen Frank		

=== Television ===
Year	Title	Role	Notes	Ref.
1990–1991	Twin Peaks	Nadine Hurley	22 episodes	
1991	Baywatch	June Reed	1 episode	
1992	Quantum Leap	Mrs. Takin	1 episode	
1994	Ultraman: The Ultimate Hero	Mrs. Takin	1 episode	
1994	Viper	Nurse	1 episode	
1995	Star Trek: Deep Space Nine	Ulani	Episode: "Destiny"	
1995	Sister, Sister	Mrs. Cathcart	1 episode	
1996	Dark Skies	Kate Balfour	1 episode	
1998	C-16: FBI	Harriet Davidson	1 episode	
2000	Party of Five	Elaine	1 episode	
2000	Any Day Now	Trish	1 episode	
2000	The Magnificent Seven	Nun	1 episode	
2017	Twin Peaks: The Return	Nadine Hurley	5 episodes	

=== Video games ===
Year	Title	Role	Notes	Ref.
1996	Zork Nemesis	Insane Patient		

== Awards and nominations ==
=== Theatre ===
Year	Award	Category	Work	Result
2003	Joseph Jefferson Awards	Actress in a Supporting Role - Play	The Trojan Women (Goodman Theatre)	Nominated
2019	Joseph Jefferson Awards	Performer in a Principal Role - Play	Elizabeth Rex (Oak Park Festival Theatre)	Nominated

=== Film ===
Year	Award	Category	Work	Result
1991	Fangoria Chainsaw Awards	Best Actress	The People Under the Stairs	Nominated
2008	Tampa International Gay and Lesbian Film Festival	Best Actress	Were the World Mine	Won
2022	Festival of Cinema NYC Jury Award	Best Ensemble Cast	Relative	Won
