= Chicago Fringe Festival =

Arts festival in Chicago, Illinois, US

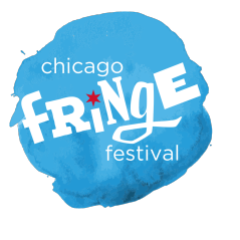
- Location: Chicago, Illinois
- Founded: 2009
- Type of play(s): Comedy, drama, dance, musical, something different
- Festival date: August 31—September 11, 2016

Chicago Fringe Festival was an annual performing arts festival showcasing traditional and non-traditional performances. CFF aimed to provide a space for artists to produce shows that would not otherwise be seen and a festival that was accessible to everyone.

== History ==
All Fringe Festivals trace their roots to the Edinburgh Festival Fringe, which began on the fringe of the Edinburgh International Festival in 1947.

After producing shows at the New York International Fringe Festival and Minnesota Fringe Festival, Executive Producer Sarah Mikayla Brown (previously Managing Director of Tantalus Theatre Group) wanted to bring that kind of "glorious chaos" to Chicago. Chicago Fringe Festival was founded on December 30, 2008.

The inaugural festival attracted 156 applicants. A total of 46 groups (23 local and 23 non-local) performed in eight non-traditional venues in Pilsen in September, 2010. After three years in Pilsen, CFF moved to Jefferson Park for the 2013 festival.

The festival ended programming in 2019 after 10 years of performances.

== Past performers ==
- Barrel of Monkeys Productions
- Duplicity Ensemble
- Instinct Theatre
- The League of Miscreants
- Mari DeOleo
- New Light Theatre Project
- Oracle Productions
- Our Fair City
- Po' Chop
- Rebecca Kling
- Royal Kung Foolery
- Spartan Theatre Company
