= The Dentist 2 =

1998 film by Brian Yuzna

- Official DVD cover
- Directed by: Brian Yuzna
- Screenplay by: Richard Dana Smith
- Based on: characters created by Dennis Paoli; Stuart Gordon; Charles Finch
- Produced by: Pierre David; Bruce David Eisen; Noël A. Zanitsch
- Starring: Corbin Bernsen; Jillian McWhirter; Susanne Wright; Clint Howard; Linda Hoffman
- Cinematography: Jürgen Baum
- Edited by: Christopher Roth
- Music by: Alan Howarth
- Production companies: Trimark Pictures; Pierre David; Image Organization
- Distributed by: Trimark Pictures
- Release dates: July 10, 1998 (Fantasia Film Festival); December 11, 1998 (U.S.)
- Running time: 100 minutes
- Country: United States
- Language: English
- Budget: $1,800,000 (estimated)

The Dentist 2 (Note: The film is also known by the following alternative titles: The Dentist 2: Brace Yourself, D2: Without Novacaine and The Dentist 2: You Know the Drill) is a 1998 American psychological slasher film directed by Brian Yuzna and starring Corbin Bernsen, Jillian McWhirter, Jeff Doucette, and Susanne Wright. It is the sequel to The Dentist (1996).

== Plot ==
Dr. Alan Feinstone is in the maximum security mental hospital he was sentenced to at the end of the first film. While talking to the psychiatrist, he remembers the murders he committed in his mind, while convincing the doctor that it was another man who did those things. His remorseful story distracts her from seeing him pull a sharpened tool that he stitched into his leg, and he uses her as a hostage to escape. Alan's wife Brooke is alive with new dental implants, despite her missing tongue and inability to speak. She hires an investigator to find out where Alan has escaped, believing that he had been putting away money before he went crazy. Brooke has in her possession some postcards that Alan had left behind, and she believes he is in one of those places.

Alan winds up in the small town of Paradise, Missouri, pretending that he has grown upset at life in the big city. He uses a previously established false identity of Dr. Lawrence Caine and has a bank account where he had been sending the money he skimmed off from his practice to hide from the IRS. The bank officer Mr. Wilkes introduces Alan to his niece Jamie, hoping that she can rent out her small cottage for "Larry" to live in so she could collect money from it.

Jamie, who physically resembles Brooke, becomes a target of Alan's affections. When he has problems with a cap on one of his teeth, Alan visits the inept town dentist, Dr. Burns, whom he takes an instant dislike to. Alan threatens Dr. Burns with a golf club, causing him to accidentally fall down the stairs to his death. Mr. Wilkes convinces Alan that he should take over as the new dentist for Paradise; Alan soon resumes his murderous ways with a passing tourist (Clint Howard) who accidentally recognizes him from Los Angeles.

As the private detective tracks Alan down to Paradise, Alan learns that Jamie has an admirer named Robbie, who also is the drywall contractor hired to finish his new office. Alan's jealousy causes him to ruin a romantic dinner when it is interrupted by a call from Robbie on her answering machine, despite Jamie's insistence that she only thinks of Robbie as a friend. Meanwhile, Beverley, a teller at the bank, has doubts about "Larry" and finds out his real identity while researching on the computer.

Beverley sets up an appointment to tell him she knows the truth, but when she asks too many questions, he realizes that she knows something. He goes behind her and sedates her with nitrous oxide. She finds herself duct-taped to the dental chair and cries and begs him to let her go. He puts a mouth clamp in her mouth to keep it open and drills her bottom-right molar tooth to the raw nerve as a "lie detector" to find out who else she has told. If she lied, he would take a sharp plaque-scraping hook and painfully force it into the nerve of the tooth he drilled, wiggling the tooth hard at the same time. He repeatedly jams the hook into the exposed nerve causing Beverly tremendous pain.

Robbie comes to install some more drywall and rings the office doorbell, leaving Alan no choice but to pause his torture session and answer the door. Robbie asks to come in and after Beverley screams Robbie goes rushing to check on her. Just as Robbie is about to rescue her, Feinstone attacks him from outside the doorway. In the ensuing fight, Alan kills Robbie with a hammer, turns back to Beverley, and re-tapes her to the dental chair.

He takes a pair of dental pliers and plays a game of "truth or tooth". He asks her what she told Jeremy about Washington, but he doesn't believe her then pulls out her left front tooth, then he asks her what she did tell Jamie. He then attempts to pull her left incisor tooth out, but instead, he breaks it by accident which angers Feinstone even more. Alan then painfully drills one of her bottom front teeth down to the nerve and continues to drill so hard that the dental clamp holding her mouth slips out from the pressure he's applying. Then, out of a final act of desperation and what seems to be her only defense, she bites down hard on the drill causing it to lock up and jam inside her teeth. Infuriated, the mad dentist tells her he has a much better idea, and that he will cut the drill out of her mouth. She then screams, and the scene comes to a close.

Later that night, Alan begins to have his obsessive-compulsive visions of germs and decay again after seeing his blood-stained uniform. Suddenly Brooke appears and begins to seduce him into one of his chairs; just before she can cut his tongue off with a pair of scissors, Jamie knocks her out with an overhead lamp. However, as Jamie is calling the police about Brooke, she spots the bloody hammer and opens a closet door to find Robbie's and Beverley's maimed corpses.

Alan turns on Jamie and a fight ensues, with him chasing her to an upstairs bathroom and finally overpowering her. He takes her to an unfinished room in the office, which in his mind is spotless, germ-free, and pure white, with opera music playing, and picks up an electric drill (which in his mind is a dental drill) and tries to drill her teeth. Jamie escapes and hides until Brooke has revived and she and Jamie trap Alan in a hallway. Brooke lunges to stab him with a pair of scissors, but Jamie inadvertently hits her over the head with a 2x4, killing her.

Alan finds Jamie hiding behind some drywall, and after banter between the two, Jamie fires a nail gun repeatedly and hits him with numerous nails. Stunned, Alan walks downstairs into the midst of a surprise welcome party being given to him by the people of Paradise. Alan calmly exits out the front door, leaving the townspeople shocked and Jamie to recover from what just happened. Alan drives off into the night with numerous nails embedded in his head and shoulders. He begins to pull them out, using one as a toothpick for his cap which was lost in his fights with Jamie and Brooke, and maniacally laughs repeatedly.

== Cast ==
- Corbin Bernsen as Dr. Alan Feinstone / Dr. Lawrence Caine
- Jillian McWhirter as Jamie Devers
- Jeff Doucette as Jeremy Wilkes
- Susanne Wright as Beverley "Bev" Trotter
- Jim Antonio as Doc Burns
- Lee Dawson as Robbie Mauro
- Wendy Robie as Bernice
- Ralph Martin as Detective Jenkins
- Clint Howard as "Mr. Toothache"
- Linda Hoffman as Brooke Sullivan
- Judy Nazemetz as Margaret
- Audra Wise as Shawna
- Mary Coleston as Glenda
- Rae Norman as Dr. Genevieve Cussler
- Gina-Raye Carter as Sidewalk Cafe Owner (uncredited)
- Greg Bronson as Restaurant Patron (uncredited)
- Spencer Kayden as Sidewalk Café Woman (uncredited)
- Michael Stadvec as Matt (archive footage, uncredited)

== Production ==
=== Development ===
Following the success of The Dentist, a sequel was greenlit, with Brian Yuzna returning as director. The script was written by Richard Dana Smith. Pierre David was unhappy with the script changes for the first film, and refused to let Yuzna see the script. Yuzna had only one weekend of pre-production and work on the script before production began.

=== Filming ===
Principal photography began on February 23, 1998 and ended in March 1998. The film was shot by Jürgen Baum on a budget of $700,000. Filming locations included Rossmore Avenue (exterior 450 at the El Royale Motel) and El Royale (exteriors for the El Royale Motel) in Los Angeles, and 608-610 S Myrtle Avenue (outdoor Paradise street scenes) and Sam's Mediterranean Kabob Room (restaurant) in Monrovia.

During the filming of the scene where Dr. Alan Feinstone digs a grave, David told Yuzna that the home owners did not want their garden dug. A plastic tarp covered in a thin layer of soil was laid on it to achieve the effect of Corbin Bernsen digging in the garden.

=== Casting ===
Corbin Bernsen and Linda Hoffman reprised their roles as Dr. Alan Feinstone and Brooke Sullivan, respectively. Jillian McWhirter was cast as Jamie Devers. Additional actors and actresses cast for the film included Jeff Doucette, Susanne Wright, Jim Antonio, Lee Dawson, Wendy Robie, Ralph Martin, Clint Howard, Judy Nazemetz, Audra Wise, Mary Coleston, Rae Norman, Gina-Raye Carter, Greg Bronson, and Spencer Kayde. The Dentist 2 was Carter's first film role. Dawson refused to film a nude scene with McWhirter, so a body double was used instead. During the scene where Alan digs a grave, Howard, who played "Mr. Toothache", was unavailable, and the production team could not afford to hire him for another day, so they decided to only shoot a pair of shoes worn by a double.

=== Special effects ===
The special makeup effects were supervised by Anthony C. Ferrante and done by Lori Ann Baker, Shea Clayton, Matt Falletta, Screaming Mad George, Sam Greenmun, J.M. Logan, Melanie Mills, Ralis Kahn, Jessica Smith, Brad Sykes, and A.J. Venuto.

== Release ==
The Dentist 2 was released directly to television, premiering on HBO on December 11, 1998.

A second sequel, titled The Dentist 3, was greenlit by Trimark Pictures, in which Dr. Alan Feinstone relocates to a dental surgery in a shopping mall. Brian Yuzna was set to direct the film, and Corbin Bernsen was to reprise his role as Dr. Alan Feinstone. The film was never made as Yuzna was busy forming Fantastic Factory.

=== Home media ===
In January 2023, The Dentist 2 was released on Blu-ray by Lionsgate Home Entertainment through their label Vestron Video, as part of their Vestron Video Collector's Series, in a two-disc set alongside the first film.

== Reception ==
=== Critical response ===
Rotten Tomatoes reports that 0% of five surveyed critics gave the film a positive review; the average rating is 3.70/10. AllMovie's review of the film was negative, writing "this perfunctory sequel repeats those earlier grotesqueries [from The Dentist] pretty much shot for shot".

=== Accolades ===
Brian Yuzna was nominated for Best Film at the 1998 Sitges Film Festival.
