= Greenhouse Theater Center =

Theater in Chicago, Illinois, U.S.

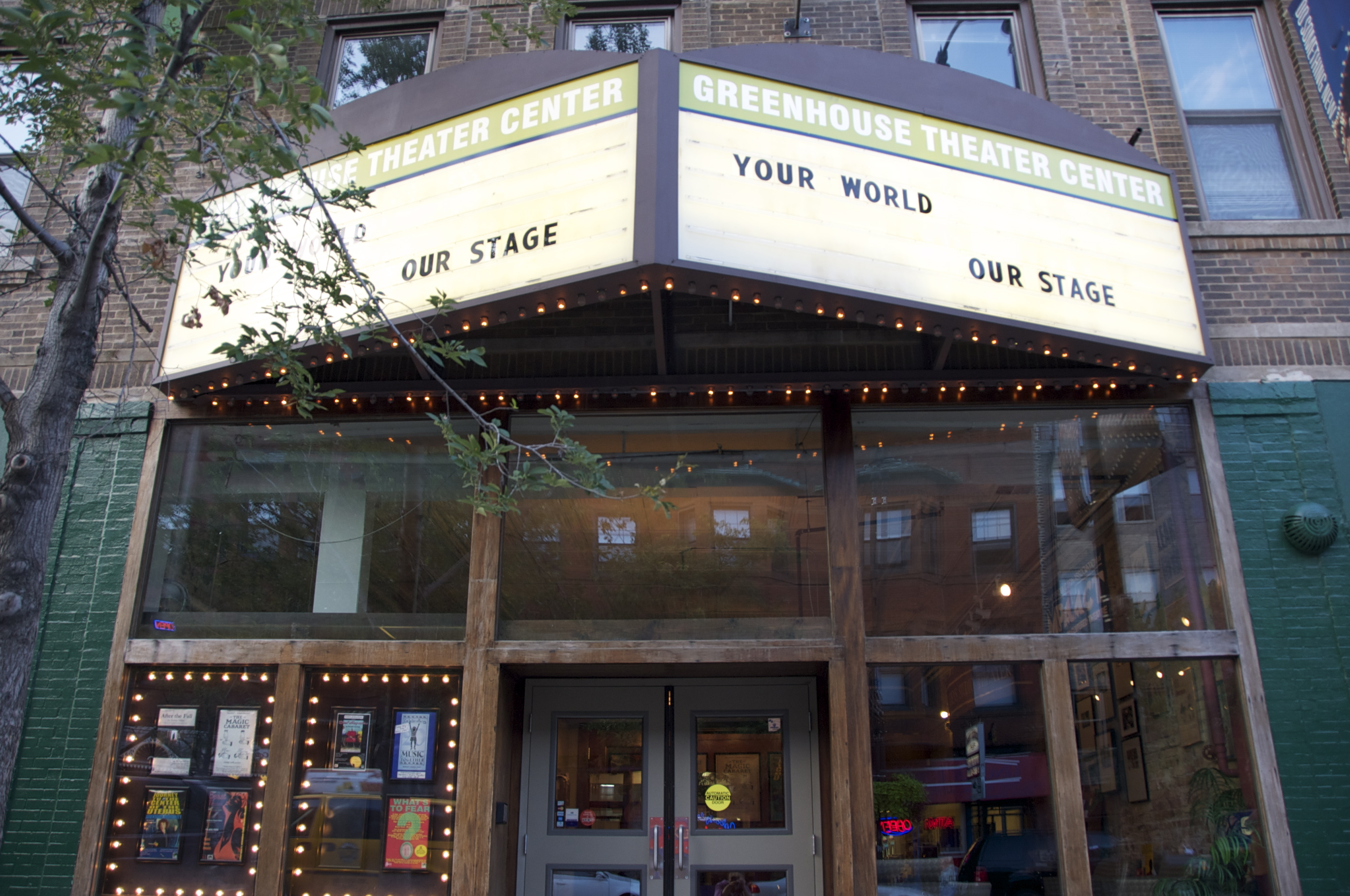
- 2257 N. Lincoln

- Location within Illinois
- Address: 2257 N Lincoln Ave
- Location: Chicago, Illinois 60614
- Coordinates: 41.9235°N 87.6477°W
- Seating type: Reserved seating

Construction
- Opened: 2014

Website
- www.greenhousetheater.org

The Greenhouse Theater Center is a professional, non-profit theater located in the heart of Chicago's Lincoln Park. The Greenhouse Theater Center hosts multiple Off-Loop theater companies, including Eclipse Theatre Company, Hubris Productions, MPAACT, Organic Theatre Company, Remy Bumppo Theatre Company, The Magic Cabaret, and Theater Seven Of Chicago.

== History ==
Founded in 2008, the Greenhouse Theater Center was the original home for the Body Politic Theater and Victory Gardens Theater.

The Wendy and William Spatz Charitable Foundation purchased the theater building from Victory Gardens Theater with a promise to maintain the current function of the building as a multi-stage theater space. The Greenhouse Theater Center is as an "incubator" for small to mid-size theater companies, hence its name.

This multi-stage artists' space provides five stages, dressing and staging areas, as well as, office space for resident companies to grow.

Greenhouse Theater Center hosted one of the first indoor theatrical productions in Chicago following the relaxation of COVID-19 restrictions in 2020. The decision generated controversy within the local theater community and led to the resignation of the theater's general manager, Derek Rienzi Van Tassel.

On July 18, 2020, Van Tassel posted the following statement on Facebook:

"William Spatz and Wendy Spatz are not friends of the Chicago Theater Community. Their decision to reopen The Greenhouse with a show this weekend is foolish and dangerous. The theater is in the epicenter of the virus, Lincoln Park, and they have not thoroughly addressed their safety precautions. Reopening right now in the middle of this pandemic will only spread the virus further, cause another lockdown, and put more theater artists out of work. This is unacceptable.”

The reopening also resulted in Greenhouse Theater Center being placed on Actors' Equity Association's "Do Not Work" list.

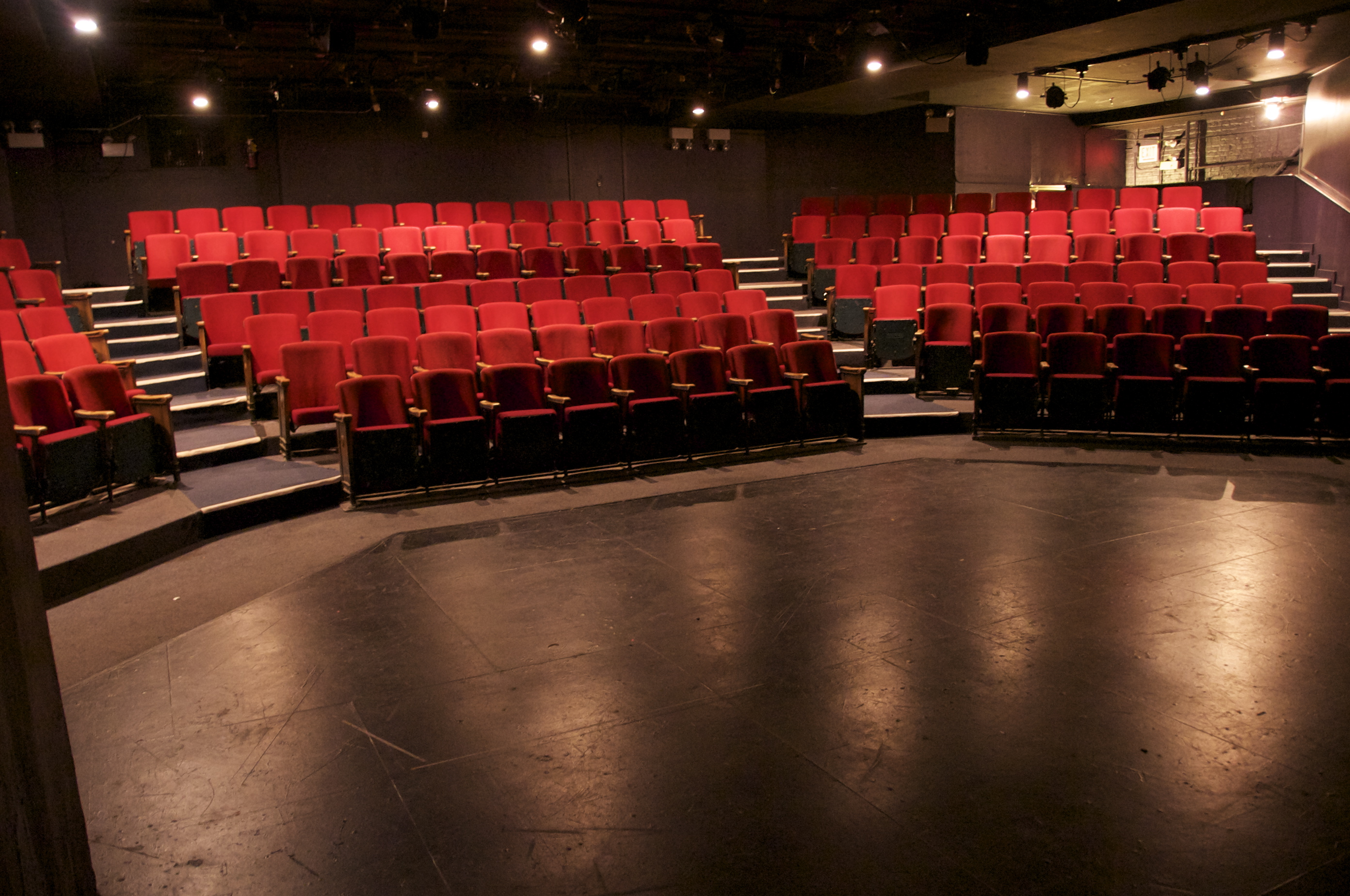
Downstairs Mainstage Theatre

== Educational outreach ==
The Greenhouse Theater Center is home to Lil' Buds Theatre Company as well as Marsha's Music. Both organizations provide various arts education to children through classes and summer camps. The Greenhouse Theater Center is also home to the Institute for Arts Entrepreneurship and their partner with the Norway-based Ensemble Free Theater. This international endeavour will kick off with Chicago playing host to the Norwegian students enrolled in this new program and taking classes in the four Greenhouse Theater Center spaces with performances at both Greenhouse and Gorilla Tango Theatre.
