= Rae Norman =

American actress (1958–2020)

- Born: Rae Norman; April 1, 1958; Pryor, Oklahoma, U.S.
- Died: November 14, 2020 (aged 62)
- Resting place: Graham Memorial Cemetery, Pryor, Oklahoma
- Occupation: Actress
- Years active: 1989–2009
- Spouse: Dean Mora (1998–2011) (divorced)

Rae Norman (April 1, 1958 – November 14, 2020) was an American actress.

Among mainly television acting appearances, she may be best known for her appearance in the Star Trek: The Next Generation episode "Tapestry" and in The Harsh Life of Veronica Lambert (2009).

She is also credited as Rendé Rae Norman and Rendi Rae Norman.

== Filmography ==
Year	Title	Role	Notes
1984	Vacanze in America	Rendi Rae Norman	Credited as Rendi Rae Norman
1991	21 Jump Street	Mickey Crofft	Episode: "Film at Eleven"
1993	Aspen Extreme	Mrs. Hansen	
1994	Star Trek: The Next Generation	Penny Muroc	Episode: "Tapestry"
1994	The Young and the Restless	Gloria Capshaw	
1996	Seinfeld	Ms. Baines	Episode: "The Soulmate"
1996	Caroline in the City	Woman #1	Episode: "Caroline and the Therapist"
1997	Beyond Belief: Fact or Fiction	Imaginary Friend	
1998	Mike Hammer, Private Eye	Lieutenant Bonner	Episode: "Gone Fishin'"
1998	Sliders	Janie	Episode: "Slidecage"
1998	The Dentist 2	Dr. Cussler	Credited as Rendé Rae Norman
1998	Silk Stalkings	Helen	Episode: "Fear and Loathing in Palm Beach"
2000	Boston Public	Mrs. LeBlonde	Episode: "Chapter Four"
2005	Desperate Housewives	Mrs. Novak	Episode: "You'll Never Get Away from Me"
2006	Crumbs	Woman #1	Episode: "Pilot"
2006	Cold Case	Anne Bowen	Episode: "The River"
2009	The Harsh Life of Veronica Lambert	Veronica's Mother	
