= Ike Holter =

American playwright (born 1985)

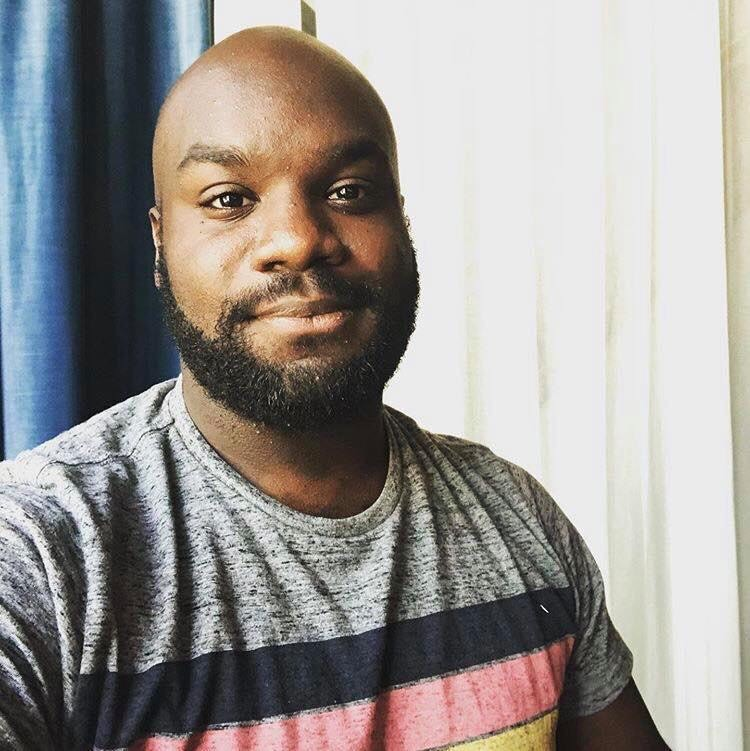
- Born: 1985 (age 40–41); Minneapolis, Minnesota, U.S.
- Education: DePaul University (BFA)
- Occupation: Playwright

Ike Holter (born 1985) is an American playwright. He won a Windham–Campbell Literature Prize for drama in 2017. Holter was a resident playwright at Victory Gardens Theater, and has been commissioned by The Kennedy Center, The Eugene O'Neill Theater Center, South Coast Repertory and The Playwrights' Center.

== Early life ==
Ike Holter was born in Minneapolis, Minnesota. He has said that attending a performance of Sweeney Todd at the Guthrie Theatre in Minneapolis at the age of eleven inspired him to pursue a career in theater. He attended Minneapolis South High School and then studied playwriting at The Theatre School at DePaul University in Chicago. He is gay.

== Career ==
His play Hit the Wall was produced by The Inconvenience as part of Steppenwolf Theater Company's Garage Rep in 2012. It made the Chicago Tribune's "Top Ten Plays of 2012" list. It went on to be produced off-broadway at Barrow Street and in many cities around the country, including a sold out and three times extended 2015-2016 production in Los Angeles at the LGBT Center that was nominated for many "Best of the Year" awards in LA.

In 2014, he wrote Exit Strategy for Jackalope Theater. Chris Jones of the Chicago Tribune called it "at once poetic, political, sad, funny, timely, complex and compassionate, Ike Holter's thrilling, beautiful new play Exit Strategy is the story of the desperate final days of a condemned, crumbling Chicago public school dreading its upcoming prom date with the cruel bulldozers from City Hall." The play has also been produced at Philadelphia Theater Company and Off Broadway at Primary Stages Theater in addition to regional productions in Boston, Los Angeles, Houston, and other cities.

His later plays have included B-Side Studio (2013), Exit Strategy (2014), Sender (2016) The Light Fantastic (2018) and The Wolf at the End of the Block (2017). The Goodman premiered Lottery Day in the spring of 2019, the capstone to the seven-play "saga" about a fictional Chicago neighborhood called Rightlynd.

He served as a staff writer for the FX series produced by Lin-Manuel Miranda, "Fosse/Verdon", writing "All I Care About is Love", the series 6th episode. He is a resident playwright of Victory Gardens Theater.

In 2021, Holter is developing a TV miniseries about the 1983 election and tenure of Chicago mayor Harold Washington, the first African American to hold the office.

== Awards ==
In 2017, Holter was one of eight winners of Yale's annual Windham-Campbell Literature Prizes, one of the highest awards for playwriting in the world.

In 2018, the American Theatre Critics Association (ATCA) selected Holter as one of six finalists for the Harold and Mimi Steinberg/ATCA New Play Award, recognizing playwrights for the best scripts that premiered professionally outside New York City during 2017, for his play The Wolf at the End of the Block.
