= Gasparilla International Film Festival =

Film festival in Tampa Bay, Florida

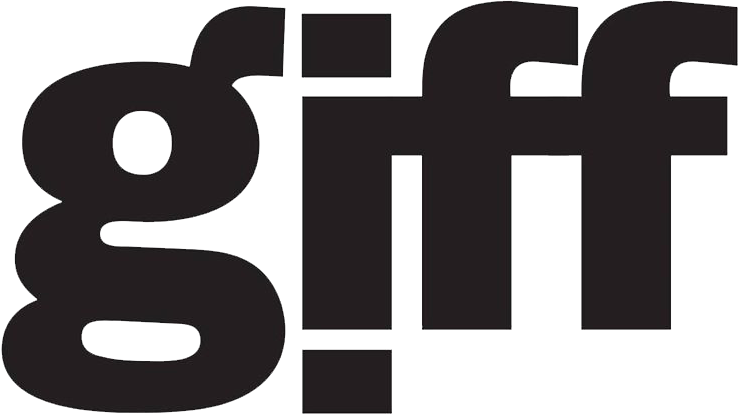
- Location: Tampa Bay, Florida
- Started: 2007
- Directors: Monica Varner (Executive Director)
- Website: gasparillafilmfestival.com

Gasparilla International Film Festival (GIFF, stylized as gịff) is an annual independent film festival that takes place in Tampa Bay, Florida. The festival is run by the Tampa Film Institute, a non-profit organization dedicated to advancing film education and supporting filmmakers in the Tampa Bay area. The first Gasparilla Film Festival took place in 2007.

== History ==
The Gasparilla Film Festival is run by the Tampa Film Institute, a 501(c)(3) non-profit organization. Founded in 2006, the Tampa Film Festival is dedicated to advancing film education and supporting filmmakers, along with community involvement in film in the Tampa Bay area.

The inaugural Gasparilla Film Festival was held in 2007. Films screened at the festival include Color Me Obsessed, screened in 2011; The Iceman, screened in 2013; Enemy and Boys of Abu Ghraib, both screened in 2014; Whit Stillman's Love & Friendship, screened in 2016; François Ozon's Frantz, screened in 2017; Nia DaCosta's Little Woods, screened in 2019; and Potsy Ponciroli's Old Henry and Michael Glover Smith's Relative, both screened in 2022. In 2025, the film festival hosted the Southeast Premiere of Oscar-winning Documentary Feature Mr Nobody Against Putin and the Oscar-nominated short The Man Who Could Not Remain Silent.

The film festival also hosts a High School competition for local high school short films.

MovieMaker magazine named it one of the "Top 50 Film Festivals Worth the Entry Fee" from 2013 to 2015 and summed up the festival's programming philosophy as "less is more" in a 2017 article, which noted that "GIFF focuses on treating every one of its curated screenings as a major event".
