= American Blues Theater =

Organization

- Formation: 1985
- Type: Theatre group
- Location: Chicago
- Artistic director: Gwendolyn Whiteside
- Website: http://www.americanbluestheater.com/

American Blues Theater is a nonprofit, professional Equity theater company in Chicago, Illinois, United States.

== History ==
American Blues Theater was founded in 1985. Richard Christiansen of the Chicago Tribune cited the theater as one of three companies in his editorial "Chicago Theater Forges New Standards of Glory."

From 1997 to 2009, the company was led by artistic directors from outside of the ensemble. Under this leadership from 1997 to 2007, the theater's name changed to the American Theater Company (ATC), the mission statement was revised, and the business expanded significantly. In 2008, under new management, the ensemble theater practice was dismantled. After 18 months of talks with new management, every ensemble member before 2008 left the ATC in March 2009 citing "major administrative and artistic differences."

The ensemble immediately reformed under its original name of the American Blues Theater. The founding board members reconstituted the board, and ensemble member Gwendolyn Whiteside became the artistic director. Under her leadership, American Blues has expanded the ensemble and diversified its base of artists. Whiteside established the annual Blue Ink Award for playwriting, incorporated community service into the company's mission, and developed arts education programming for Chicago Public Schools, which serves just under 4,000 students annually. During her tenure, she secured the first endowment, first reserve fund, and first permanent artistic home in the company’s history.

After more than three decades as an itinerant theater, in 2022 American Blues Theater purchased a 17,965 sq ft property at 5627 N. Lincoln Ave. in Chicago to transform into its first permanent home. The venue includes a 137-seat proscenium and a 50-seat flexible studio. The renovated venue opened in November 2023.

== Community service ==
American Blues Theater provides community service for not-for-profit organizations such as The Family Institute at Northwestern University, Chicago Public Schools, American Indian Center, HANA Center, Chicago Latina Moms, American Foundation for Suicide Prevention, and the United Service Organizations. Since 2009, the theater has held food and book drives, distributed promotional tickets, and raised awareness for children's surgeries and health needs.

== Awards ==
The theater is a previous winner of American Theatre Wing's National Theatre Company Award.

As of 2024, the theater and artists have 246 Jeff Awards and nominations, marking distinction in Chicago theater, and 44 Black Theater Alliance Awards.

== Production history ==
More than half of the mainstage productions are world and Chicago premieres. The theater's new play development consists of a variety of programs, including world and Chicago premieres, the Blue Ink Award for playwriting, Blueprint play development, and the annual festival of short plays, The Ripped Festival.

+ indicates World Premiere production

Season 1 (1985)

- Dogman's Last Stand by Rick Cleveland +

Season 2 (1986)

- Geography of a Horse Dreamer by Sam Shepard
- Hawk Moon by Sam Shepard

Season 3 (1987)

- Summer Brave by William Inge
- The Hairy Ape by Eugene O'Neill

Season 4 (1988)

- Bad Moon by Rick Cleveland +

Season 5 (1989–1990)

- Desire Under the Elms by Eugene O'Neill
- Peacekeeper by Keith Reddin

Season 6 (1991)

- Monsters: Glimpses of Urban Lunacy +

Season 7 (1992)

- Monsters II: Visiting Hours +

Season 8 (1993)

- Food From Trash by Gary Leon Hill

Season 9 (1994)

- Monsters III: The El Ride +
- On the Waterfront by Budd Schulberg and Stan Silverman +

Season 10 (1995–1996)

- Keely and Du by Jane Martin
- Tom and Jerry by Rick Cleveland +
- The Homage That Follows by Mark Medoff

Season 11 (1996–1997)

- The Flight of the Phoenix by Tim Hendrickson +
- Don't Disappoint Captain January by Joseph Urbinato +
- Stalag 17 by Donald Bevan and Edmund Trzcinski (co-production with Harvest Productions)
- Train of Thought by Andrew Micheli +
- Toys in the Attic by Lillian Hellman

Season 12 (1997–1998)

- A Stone Carver by William Mastrosimone
- Scapin adapted from Molière by Bill Irwin and Mark O'Donnell
- Bus Stop by William Inge
- The Million Bells of Ocean by Edward Mast

Season 13 (1998–1999)

- The Threepenny Opera by Bertolt Brecht and Kurt Weill
- One Day Only by Edward Mast +
- Pledge of Allegiance by Mark R. Giesser
- Below the Belt by Richard Dresser
- La Tectonica de las Nubes/Cloud Tectonics by Jose Rivera (co-production with Centro Cultural Helenico, Mexico City) +

Season 14 (1999–2000)

- The Skin of Our Teeth by Thornton Wilder
- American Buffalo by David Mamet
- Medea by Euripides, translated by Nicholas Rudall +
- The Mineola Twins by Paula Vogel

Season 15 (2000–2001)

- Endgame by Samuel Beckett
- Working by Stephen Schwartz and Nina Faso
- Vick's Boy by Ben Bettenbender
- Catch 22 by Joseph Heller +

Season 16 (2001–2002)

- A Lie of the Mind by Sam Shepard
- Flung by Lisa Dillman
- The Trip to Bountiful by Horton Foote

Season 17 (2002–2003)

- Quake by Melanie Marnich
- Where Have You Gone, Jimmy Stewart? by Art Shay +
- Two Rooms by Lee Blessing
- The Hairy Ape by Eugene O'Neill

Season 18 (2003–2004)

- Tintypes by Scott Joplin, George M. Cohan, John Philip Sousa, and others
- Angel City by Sam Shepard
- American Dead by Brett Neveu +
- Strictly Dishonorable by Preston Sturges

Season 19 (2004–2005)

- A View from the Bridge by Arthur Miller
- It's a Wonderful Life: A Live Radio Play adapted by Joe Landry from the film by Frank Capra
- Kid Simple by Jordan Harrison
- Living Out by Lisa Loomer (co-produced with Teatro Vista)

Season 20 (2005–2006)

- Orpheus Descending by Tennessee Williams
- It's a Wonderful Life: A Live Radio Play by the American Blues Theater Ensemble
- St. Scarlet by Julia Jordan
- Heritage by Brett Neveu +

Season 21 (2006–2007)

- The Dark at the Top of the Stairs by William Inge
- It's a Wonderful Life: A Live Radio Play by the American Blues Theater Ensemble
- Oklahoma! by Richard Rodgers and Oscar Hammerstein II
- Half of Plenty by Lisa Dillman +

Season 22 (2007–2008)

- I Do! I Do! by Tom Jones and Harvey Schmidt
- It's a Wonderful Life: The Radio Play by the American Blues Theater Ensemble
- Augusta by Richard Dresser
- Speech & Debate by Stephen Karam

Season 23 (2008–2009)

- People's Temple by Leigh Fondakowski
- Celebrity Row by Itamar Moses
- It's a Wonderful Life: The Radio Play by the American Blues Theater Ensemble
- Topdog/Underdog by Suzan-Lori Parks
- True West by Sam Shepard

Season 24 (2009–2010)

- It's a Wonderful Life: Live at the Biograph! by the American Blues Theater Ensemble +
- Tobacco Road by Jack Kirkland

Season 25 (2010–2011)

- It's a Wonderful Life: Live at the Biograph! by the American Blues Theater Ensemble
- Rantoul and Die by Mark Roberts

Season 26 (2011–2012)

- Waiting for Lefty by Clifford Odets
- It's a Wonderful Life: Live at the Biograph! by the American Blues Theater Ensemble

Season 27 (2012–2013)

- Illegal Use of Hands by James Still +
- It's a Wonderful Life: Live at the Biograph! by the American Blues Theater Ensemble
- Collected Stories by Donald Margulies

Season 28 (2013–2014)

- Hank Williams: Lost Highway by Randal Myler and Mark Harelik
- It's a Wonderful Life: Live in Chicago! by the American Blues Theater Ensemble +
- American Myth by Christina Gorman
- Grounded by George Brant

Season 29 (2014–2015)

- Hank Williams: Lost Highway by Randal Myler and Mark Harelik
- Native Son adapted by Nambi E. Kelley (co-production with Court Theatre) +
- It's a Wonderful Life: Live in Chicago by the American Blues Theater Ensemble
- Yankee Tavern by Steven Dietz
- Side Man by Warren Leight

Season 30 (2015–2016)

- The Rainmaker by N. Richard Nash
- It's a Wonderful Life: Live in Chicago! by the American Blues Theater Ensemble
- Looking Over the President's Shoulder by James Still
- Little Shop of Horrors by Howard Ashman and Alan Menken

Season 31 (2016–2017)

- Dutchman by Amiri Baraka & TRANSit by Darren Canady +
- It's a Wonderful Life: Live in Chicago by the American Blues Theater Ensemble
- The Columnist by David Auburn

Season 32 (2017–2018)

- Beauty's Daughter by Dael Orlandersmith
- It's a Wonderful Life: Live in Chicago by the American Blues Theater Ensemble
- Six Corners by Keith Huff +
- Buddy – The Buddy Holly Story by Alan James

Season 33 (2018–2019)

- Flyin' West by Pearl Cleage
- It's a Wonderful Life: Live in Chicago by the American Blues Theater Ensemble
- On Clover Road by Steven Dietz
- The Absolute Brightness of Leonard Pelkey by Celeste Lecesne
- The Spitfire Grill by James Valeq & Fred Alley

Season 34 (2019–2020)

- Five Presidents by Rick Cleveland
- It's a Wonderful Life: Live in Chicago by the American Blues Theater Ensemble
- Roan @ The Gates by Christina Telesca

Season 35 (2020–2021)

- It's a Wonderful Life: Live in Chicago by the American Blues Theater Ensemble (live interactive show on Zoom)

Season 36 (2021–2022)

- It's a Wonderful Life: Live in Chicago by the American Blues Theater Ensemble
- Stand Up If You're Here Tonight by John Kolvenbach

Season 37 (2022–2023)

- Fences by August Wilson
- Alma by Benjamin Benne +
- It's a Wonderful Life: Live in Chicago by the American Blues Theater Ensemble

Season 38 (2023–2024)

- It's a Wonderful Life: Live in Chicago by the American Blues Theater Ensemble
- The Reclamation of Madison Hemings by Charles Smith
- The Last Wide Open by Audrey Cefaly

Season 39 (2024–2025)

- Misery by William Goldman
- The Last Wide Open by Audrey Cefaly
- It's a Wonderful Life: Live in Chicago by the American Blues Theater Ensemble
- Golden Leaf Ragtime Blues by Charles Smith

Season 40 (2025–2026)

- Things With Friends by Kristoffer Diaz +
- It's a Wonderful Life: Live in Chicago by the American Blues Theater Ensemble
- Come Back, Little Sheba by William Inge
- Always...Patsy Cline by Ted Swindley

== Blue Ink Award for playwriting ==
American Blues Theater's nationally renowned Blue Ink Award for playwriting was created in 2010 to support new work. Each year the theater accepts worldwide submissions of original, unpublished full-length plays. The winning play is selected by the artistic director and the theater's Ensemble.

Since inception, 15 Award winners, 172 finalists, and 258 semi-finalists have been named. Recent winners include:

- 2025 – You Should Be So Lucky by Alyssa Haddad-Chin
- 2024 – The Conquered by Ken Urban | world premiere American Blues Theater, Chicago 2026-2027
- 2023 – Things With Friends by Kristoffer Diaz | world premiere American Blues Theater, Chicago, 2025
- 2022 – The Reapers on Woodbrook Avenue by Mardee Bennett
- 2021 – Refugee Rhapsody by Yussef El Guindi
- 2020 – Recent Unsettling Events by Andrea Stolowitz
- 2019 – Alma by Benjamin Benne | world premiere American Blues Theater, Chicago, 2022; Center Theater Group, L.A., 2022
- 2018 – Welcome to Matteson! by Inda Craig-Galván | world premiere New Jersey Repertory Company, 2023; Congo Square Theatre, Chicago, 2023.
- 2017 – Hype Man by Idris Goodwin | world premiere Company One, Boston, 2018
- 2016 – The Wind and the Breeze by Nathan Alan Davis | world premiere Cygnet Theatre, San Diego, 2018
- 2015 – Other Than Honorable by Jamie Pachino | world premiere Geva Theatre Center, NY, 2017
- 2014 – Comden Mall Community Activists by Douglas Post
- 2013 – Graveyard of Empires by Elaine Romero | world premiere 16th Street Theater, Chicago, 2015
- 2012 – American Myth by Christina Telesca | world premiere American Blues Theater, Chicago, 2014
- 2011 – American Home by Stephanie Walker | world premiere, Pasadena, CA, 2017
