= Since You've Been Gone (film) =

1998 film directed by David Schwimmer

- Genre: Comedy; Romance
- Written by: Jeff Steinberg
- Directed by: David Schwimmer
- Starring: Philip Rayburn Smith; David Schwimmer; Lara Flynn Boyle; Teri Hatcher; Joey Slotnick; Joy Gregory; Heidi Stillman
- Music by: Pray for Rain
- Country of origin: United States
- Original language: English

Production
- Executive producers: Brian Medavoy; Jeff Steinberg; Bob Weinstein; Harvey Weinstein
- Producers: Richard N. Gladstein; Priscilla Cohen; Kathie Hersch
- Cinematography: Denis Lenoir
- Editor: Kevin Tent
- Running time: 96 minutes
- Production companies: FilmColony; Miramax

Original release
- Network: ABC
- Release: April 18, 1998

Since You've Been Gone is a 1998 American comedy film directed by David Schwimmer about a class reunion. It debuted as a television film on ABC in April 1998.

== Plot ==
Set in downtown Chicago during one long evening and night, the film follows several characters as they attend a ten-year high school reunion organized by the smarmy Robert S. Levitt who used to be the high school's class president. Among the many guests attending are Kevin MacEldowney, his wife Molly and their friend Zane Levy. Kevin is a medical doctor who does not look forward to the reunion. He was humiliated on graduation day, after being beaten up in a brawl by his rival Pat Prince, who is also attending the reunion. Zane is a composer who is trying to make a comeback after a song that he wrote was plagiarized by a national record label, something over which he remains bitter.

Among the guests are Duncan Shepard and Clay Mellon, two mismatched best friends who are having their own life problems. Duncan recently lost his business and tries to sugar-coat his life while he inadvertently helps out others with their own business problems. Clay is a manic depressive at a crossroads with his life while trying to connect with others to find his own life path.

Electra Pollack and Holly Petuto are also best friends attending where the accident-prone Electra tries to find a man to hook up with in order to be her potential new husband, and Holly is book author and self-help therapist who constantly talks about surviving a recent plane crash where she emerged unscathed. Electra and Holly are friends with Maria Goldstein who has become a wealthy business entrepreneur but who finds her own success to be lonely as well.

Grace Williams is a demented practical joker who causes various mischief and mayhem at the reunion to anyone who slightly angers or annoys her, and who later hooks up with Clay after they bond over their similar life situations as both of whom hold a personal grudge against Robert Levitt.

== Cast ==
- Philip Rayburn Smith as Kevin MacEldowney
- Joy E. Gregory as Mollie Rusk
- Joey Slotnick as Zane Levy
- Teri Hatcher as Maria Goldstein
- Jon Stewart as Todd Zalinsky
- Rachel Griffiths as Sally Zalinsky
- Lara Flynn Boyle as Grace Williams
- David Schwimmer as Robert S. Levitt
- David Catlin as Duncan Shepherd
- Thom Cox as Clay Mellon
- Love Jones as the reunion band

The film also features cameo appearances by various actors and actresses, including Molly Ringwald as a book fan of Holly's; Liev Schreiber as Fred Neff, a solo dancing attendee; Jennifer Grey as Polly Reed, a prescription medication addict; Carlos Jacott as the reunion's bartender; Helen Martin as a rude old lady that Clay and Grace encounter; and Marisa Tomei as Tori, another reunion guest.

== Production ==
Most of the film was shot in downtown Chicago at the Hotel Allegro (then called the Bismarck Hotel) as well as the neighboring Palace Theater where the reunion takes place. Some portions of the film were shot in Palm Springs, California. The film was Schwimmer's debut directing a movie. In order to do the movie, Schwimmer had to turn down a role in the Columbia Pictures film Men in Black, which became one of the highest grossing films of 1997.

== Release ==
The film was intended to be released theatrically in 1997 by Miramax, which had been an adult-focused label of Disney since 1993. The film itself is set in 1997, as the characters are celebrating the 10th anniversary of their high school graduation in 1987. A reason the film may have been held back could have been due to 1997's Grosse Point Blank and Romy and Michele's High School Reunion, two other 80s-themed high school reunion films tied to Disney. These two films were released within weeks of each other in April 1997, by Disney's other adult-focused labels Hollywood Pictures and Touchstone Pictures. Despite having the standard credits for a theatrical film, Since You've Been Gone instead premiered in 1998 as a TV movie on ABC, which was owned by Disney. In 1999, the film was released on VHS by Disney's Buena Vista Home Video, who handled home video distribution for all of Miramax's films. On October 28, 2002, Buena Vista Home Video released the film on DVD.

In 2010, Disney sold off Miramax, with Qatari company beIN subsequently taking it over in 2016. In 2020, ViacomCBS (now known as Paramount Skydance) bought a 49% stake in Miramax, with the remaining 51% stake belonging to beIN. This deal gave Paramount the rights to Miramax's film catalog, including Since You've Been Gone. The film has been made digitally available on Amazon Prime and Apple TV, as well as on the free streaming service Tubi.

== Reception ==
On review aggregator website Rotten Tomatoes, the film holds an approval rating of 20% based on 5 reviews, with an average rating of 4.4/10.
