= Lee Pelty =

American musical theatre actor (1935–2009)

Lee Pelty (4 May 1935 – 29 November 2009) was an American musical theatre actor, best known for his performances in numerous productions of Fiddler on the Roof, Man of La Mancha, 1776, and more. Because of audience demand, Pelty most frequently appeared to sold-out crowds at the Old Candlelight Dinner Playhouse in Chicago.

== Early life ==
Born in Colon City, Panama as Isaac Lee Peltynovich (Pelty), he attended Purdue University as a member of the class of 1957. In addition to his studies, Pelty sang with the Purdue University Varsity Men's Glee Club directed by an imaginative showman named Al Stewart. Pelty's successes with the Glee Club were the springboard for his professional musical career. The Purdue Glee Club was internationally known as one of the best all-male college singing groups in the world and Pelty was its leading soloist and star attraction. In each concert, he appeared as a figure in the group's traditional concert attire of white tie and tails. With 56 men, all students at Purdue and strictly amateur singers, were selected from hundreds of the best applicants each semester and became the "traveling/touring" Varsity Men's Glee Club. He had a 2nd tenor voice with which, as a soloist with a repertoire of classic songs from the 1920s through the 1950s, entertained thousands of fans in hundreds of concerts. In each concert, Pelty always was asked to sing his very personal "Al Jolson Songbook."

One summer, the Glee Club sang in the Hollywood Bowl, The Grand Canyon's El Tovar Hotel, and Oklahoma's "Under The Stars." Pelty was the main attraction everyone came to hear. In another year, the Glee Club sang for President Eisenhower's Inauguration in Washington, DC.

== Career ==
Beginning in 1971, he appeared as Tevye in four separate productions of Fiddler on the Roof. The first of these earned him The Joseph Jefferson Award. Over the course of his career, he performed the role of Tevye over 2,000 times.

== Death ==
Lee Pelty died at his Lincoln Park home on November 29, 2009, at age 74, from lung cancer.
