= Lifeline Theatre =

Theatre in Chicago, Illinois

- Industry: Entertainment
- Founded: 1983
- Founders: Meryl Friedman, Suzanne Plunkett, Kathee Sills, Sandy Snyder Pietz, and Steve Totland
- Headquarters: Chicago, Illinois, United States
- Area served: Chicago Rogers Park
- Website: https://lifelinetheatre.com/

Lifeline Theatre was founded in Chicago, Illinois, United States in 1983 by five Northwestern University graduates: Meryl Friedman, Suzanne Plunkett, Kathee Sills, Sandy Snyder Pietz, and Steve Totland.

The company moved into its permanent location in Rogers Park —a converted Commonwealth Edison substation—in 1986. The facility includes a 99-seat theatre, rehearsal and office space, a scene shop, and costume, prop, and scenery storage.

== Awards ==
Lifeline Theatre has received numerous awards and nominations for both adult and children's programming.

=== Chicago/Illinois awards ===
Since 1986, Lifeline members have received 48 Joseph Jefferson Awards (both Equity and Non-Equity, various areas of work) while being nominated 135 times. The theatre also received After Dark awards for excellence in Chicago theatre. In 2007, Lifeline was honored by the Joseph Jefferson Awards Committee with a Special Citation for its 25-year contribution to Chicago theater.

Honoring Lifeline’s children's programming, New City named Lifeline the Best Children's Theatre Company in Chicago in 2000, and Chicago Magazine named Lifeline Best Kids' Company in 2002.

In 1991, Lifeline received an award from the Illinois Theatre Alliance for Outstanding Contribution to Children's Theatre, and in 2006 the City of Chicago presented Lifeline Theatre and Joyce Kilmer School with a special award honoring 15 years of educational partnership.

=== National awards ===
Ensemble member Meryl Friedman won the 1999 Distinguished Play Award in the Elementary Category from the American Alliance of Theatre and Education for her adaptation of Journey of the Sparrows, produced at Lifeline in 1996.

The American Alliance for Theater and Education awarded Lifeline the 2003 Sara Spencer Artistic Achievement Award for sustained and successful achievement in the field of theater for young audiences.

== Production history ==
Lifeline Theatre's work history includes MainStage productions of Pride and Prejudice, The Overcoat, The Left Hand of Darkness, The Talisman Ring, Jane Eyre, Cat's Cradle, Around the World in 80 Days, The Killer Angels, A Room with a View, The Island of Dr. Moreau, The Mark of Zorro, Treasure Island, Neverwhere, The Moonstone, Watership Down, and The Count of Monte Cristo. Lifeline also produced world premiere adaptations of each volume of J. R. R. Tolkien's The Lord of the Rings (The Fellowship of the Ring, The Two Towers, and The Return of the King) and four installments of the Dorothy L. Sayers Lord Peter Wimsey mysteries (Whose Body?, Strong Poison, Gaudy Night, and Busman's Honeymoon).

Family MainStage productions have included A Wrinkle in Time, Lizard Music, The Snarkout Boys and the Avocado of Death, The Phantom Tollbooth, Journey of the Sparrows, The Silver Chair, and Johnny Tremain.

In 1986 Lifeline inaugurated its KidSeries program. Productions have included Mr. Popper's Penguins, Mike Mulligan and His Steam Shovel, Bunnicula, James and the Giant Peach, The Story of Ferdinand, Mrs. Piggle-Wiggle, My Father's Dragon, Click Clack Moo: Cows That Type, The Stinky Cheese Man, Duck for President, The True Story of the 3 Little Pigs!, The Velveteen Rabbit, The Last of the Dragons, and Arnie the Doughnut.

== See also ==
- Chicago theatre
