= Rantoul and Die =

Play written by Mark Roberts

- Original language: English
- Written by: Mark Roberts
- Genre: Comedy

Premiere
- Date: May 2009

Rantoul and Die is a play written by Mark Roberts.

== Background ==
Roberts grew up in Urbana, Illinois, about ten miles from Rantoul which serves as the play's setting. When writing the play, Roberts noted that "in the early nineties, Chanute Air Force Base closed down, sending the local economy into a tailspin. Businesses closed and area residents moved away, giving Rantoul a desolate, ghost town feeling... when considering a location for this gritty, edgy play, Rantoul seemed the perfect choice." Furthermore, Roberts stated that the play was written during a tumultuous time for him, expanding to say that "this play is about the baby steps of someone's personal growth told in a somewhat dark way." He admits that "it's a little about me and my way of dealing with that period." He later compared the process of writing the play to "birthing an 80-pound snapping turtle that was wearing a spiked collar and a crown of thorns."

== Synopsis ==
The production notes detail the plot of the play: "Rallis and Debbie's marriage has reached its expiration date. In fact, it's soured and stuck to the bottom of the carton. She wants him to pack his stuff and hit the bricks, but he's clingin' to the past like a cat on a screen door. How far will a man go to hang on to his lady fair? It's a thin line between love and hate. A kiss and a punch. An ice cream cone and a beer bottle to the back of the head."

== 2011 Production and Cast ==
On April 22, 2011, Rantoul and Die Producers Stephen Eich and Don Foster returned with director Erin Quigley at the Victory Gardens’ Richard Christiansen Theater in Chicago. The cast included Kate Buddeke, Cheryl Graeff, and Steppenwolf Theater Ensemble members Francis Guinan & Alan Wilder.

== 2013 NYC Production ==
In 2012, Roberts' team approached The Amoralists Theatre Company to stage the New York City premiere of Rantoul and Die. The show began previews June 12, 2013 at The Cherry Lane Theatre and ran until July 20, 2013, with an opening night on June 24, 2013. The NYC production was directed by Amoralists Ensemble Member Jay Stull and the cast consisted of company members Derek Ahonen, Sarah Lemp, Matthew Pilieci, and Vanessa Vaché. The creative team included Alfred Schatz (set design), Evan Roby (lighting design), Jaime Torres (costume design), Jeanne Travis (sound design) and Nick Trotta (associate director).

== Reception ==
The play has been met with positive reviews. Roberts' writing has been lauded for its edginess and black humor. The Hollywood Reporter described the play as "an original and devastatingly funny new play helped immensely by a superb cast." The Los Angeles Times praised the cast for "[tearing] into the material with canine ferocity" and called the play a "strangely captivating comedy." Rantoul and Die was also profiled in Yahoo! News.
