= Oracle Productions =

Theatre company based in Chicago, Illinois

Oracle Productions (Oracle Theatre Company) was a Chicago, Illinois based theatre company founded in 2001. Oracle moved into a storefront space at 3809 N Broadway in June 2006. In 2010 Oracle moved to a theater model dubbed "Public Access Theatre". Their "store front" style influenced the first shop front theatre of the UK. Oracle ceased operations at the end of 2016 citing personal changes for their Executive Producer and Director.

== Past Productions ==
- 2011 Woyzeck (written by Georg Buchner, directed by Max Truax)
- 2010 Blood Wedding (written by Federico García Lorca, directed by Ben Fuchsen)
- 2010 The Ghost Sonata (written by August Strindberg, directed by Max Truax, Newcity's Top 5 Shows 2010 - according to Neal Ryan Shaw, nominated for a Jeff Award in Lighting Design)
- 2010 The Adventures of Philip Marlowe: The Hairpin Turn (adaptation of the radio play, directed by Max Truax and Lyndsay Kane)
- 2010 The Castle (written by Howard Baker, directed by Ben Fuchsen and Justin Warren)
- 2009 Disturbed
- 2009 Zero (written by Chris O'Connell, directed by Ben Fuchsen)
- 2008 Disturbed III
- 2008 Termen Vox Machina (written by M. Deegan, directed by Max Truax, Newcity's Top 5 Memorable Productions by a Smaller Theatre Troupe 2008 - according to Fabrizio O. Almeida)
- 2007 Disturbed II
- 2007 Scotland Road (written by Jeffrey Hatcher, directed by Ben Fuchsen)
- 2006 Show Game Live
- 2006 Disturbed
- 2006 The Actor's Nightmare (written by Christopher Durang, directed by Aaron Shapiro)
- 2006 Sister Mary Ignatius Explains It All For You (written by Christopher Durang, directed by Aaron Shapiro)
- 2006 Tape (written by Stephen Belber, directed by Ben Fuchsen, Newcity Chicago - Top 5 Memorable Productions by Smaller Theater Troupes 2007)
- 2005 Line
- 2005 Lakestreet Extensions
