= Kristine Thatcher =

American dramatist

Kristine Thatcher (born 1950) is a playwright, director and actress.

== Life ==
Thatcher, born Kristine Marie Schneider, began acting at 16 with a small professional company in her hometown, Lansing, Michigan. She went on to work at regional theaters across the country. Her first husband was actor Tim Thatcher, at which point she created the stage name of Margaret "Maggie" Thatcher. In 1985, while married to her second husband, actor Tom Blair, she met David Darlow while the two performed in Tom Stoppard's The Real Thing, at the Northlight Theatre in Chicago. Darlow became her third husband.

In the late 1970s and early 1980s, she acted and directed with the Milwaukee Repertory Theater. She volunteered to write a show based on the poet Lorine Niedecker's life and work, which became the play, Niedecker.

She has taught at Columbia College, Lake Forest College. Although long associated with theatre in Chicago, she was the artistic director of the Boarshead Theatre in Lansing, Michigan 2005 until 2009. Soon after she founded the Stormfield Theater in Lansing; the theater closed in 2012.

== Awards ==
Among Friends (winner of the 1997 Scott McPherson Memorial Award), Emma's Child (winner of the 1995 Susan Smith Blackburn Prize, a 1997 Illinois Arts Council Fellowship, the 1997 RESOLVE "Award for Excellence in the Arts," the 1997 Cunningham Prize for Playwriting from DePaul University, and the 1997 After Dark Award for Outstanding New Work), Voice of Good Hope (nominated for 2000 Joseph Jefferson Award for New Work).

== Works ==
- Niedecker. Samuel French, Inc. 1990. ISBN 978-0-573-69147-8.
- Under Glass (1991)
- Emma's Child (1992)
- Apparitions (1993)
- Voice of Good Hope (1997)
- Emily's Child (1998)
- Among Friends (1999)
- Voice of Good Hope (2000)
