= Richard Christiansen (critic) =

American theatre and film critic (1931–2022)

Richard Christiansen (August 1, 1931 – January 28, 2022) was an American theatre and film critic, who was "the chief theatre reviewer of the Chicago Tribune" from 1978 to 2002 and the "leading critical voice in Chicago theatre for more than three decades". He was born on August 1, 1931, in Berwyn, Illinois, to William Edward, an electrical engineer and Louise Christine (Dethlefs) Christiansen. He became the chief critic and senior writer of the newspaper. He previously worked for the Chicago Daily News from 1957 to 1978. He joined the staff of The Chicago Tribune immediately following the demise of the Chicago Daily News in 1978. The second-floor studio theatre at the Victory Gardens Theater was named after him in 2010. Christiansen is the author of the book A Theater of Our Own: A History and a Memoir of 1,001 Nights in Chicago, which was published by Northwestern University Press in 2004.

Christiansen was also noted for being instrumental in the development of Chicago's grassroots theatre movement starting in the 1960s. He died in Chicago on January 28, 2022, at the age of 90.
