= Victory Gardens Theater =

Theater company in Chicago, Illinois, US

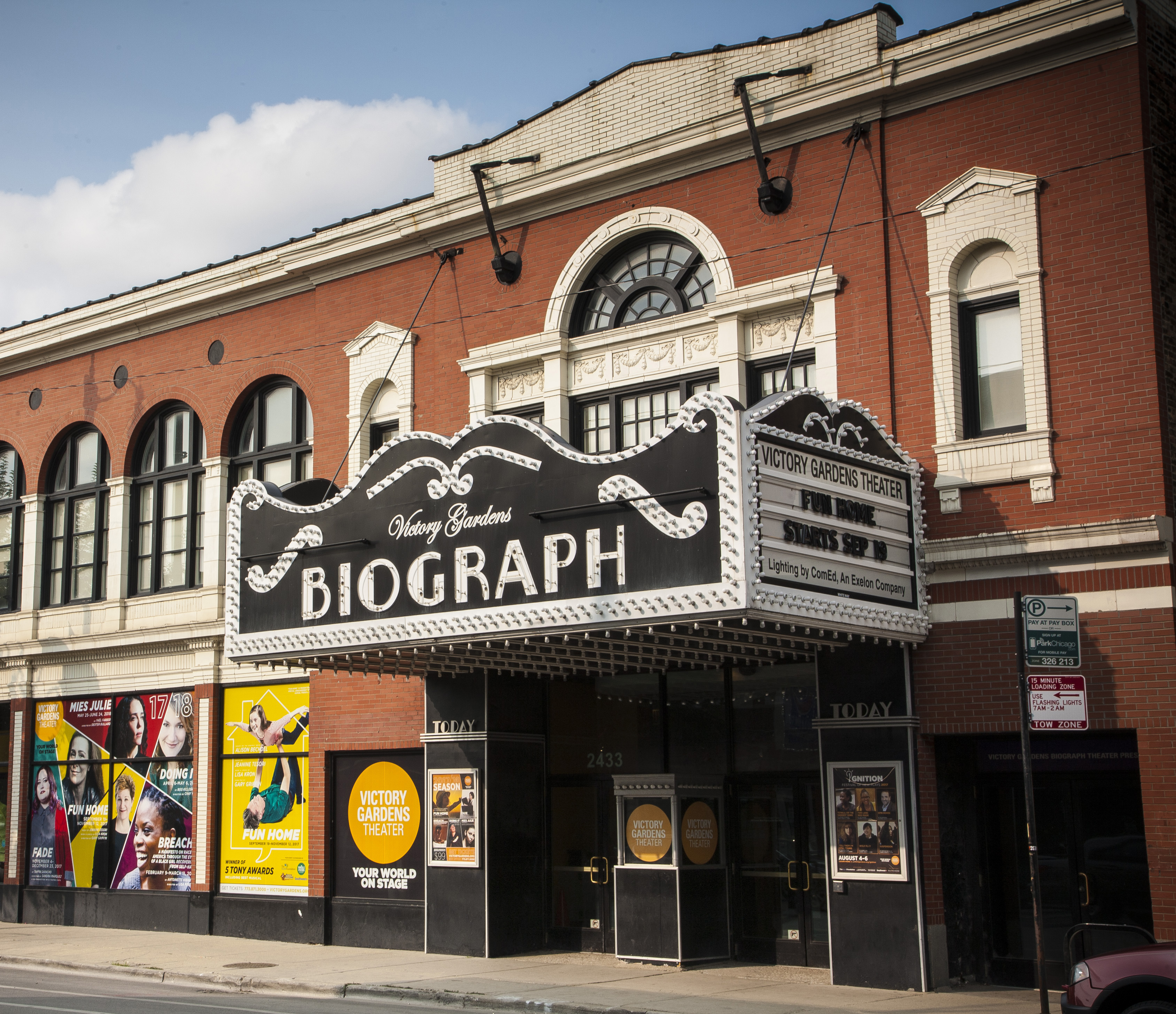
- VG Biograph in 2018

- Location within Illinois Location within the United States
- Address: 2433 N. Lincoln Avenue
- Location: Chicago, IL 60614
- Coordinates: 41.9263801°N 87.6498738°W
- Seating type: Reserved seating

Construction
- Opened: 1974

Website
- victorygardens.org

Victory Gardens Theater is a theater company in Chicago, Illinois, dedicated to the development and production of new plays and playwrights. The theater company was founded in 1974 when eight Chicago artists, Cecil O'Neal, Warren Casey, Stuart Gordon, Cordis Heard, Roberta Maguire, Mac McGuinnes, June Pyskaček, and David Rasche each fronted $1,000 to start a company outside the Chicago Loop and Gordon donated the light board of his Organic Theater Company. The theater's first production, The Velvet Rose, by Stacy Myatt, premiered on October 9, 1974.

== Clark Street, 1974 ==
The company's initial home was the Northside Auditorium Building, 3730 N. Clark Street in Chicago, originally a Swedish social club. Its second production—a country-western musical co-produced with commercial producers called The Magnolia Club by Jeff Berkson, John Karraker and David Karraker—was the company's first hit. Marcelle McVay was the first managing director.

In 1975, director Dennis Začek staged The Caretaker by Harold Pinter, beginning a relationship that led to Začek being named artistic director in 1977.

Key on-going collaborators worked with the company for the first time in the Clark Street space, including actor William L. Petersen, Marcelle McVay, director Sandy Shinner, and playwrights Steve Carter and Jeffrey Sweet. McVay, who is married to Začek, subsequently became managing director and Shinner later became associate artistic director.

== Body Politic Theater, 1981 ==
In 1981, the success of Sweet's third play with the company, Ties, led to it being transferred to an extended run in the larger space downstairs at the Body Politic Theater at 2257 N. Lincoln. When Ties closed, the downstairs space became Victory Gardens' new home. Upon the closure of the Body Politic in 1995, Victory Gardens acquired the whole building.

In 1989, Začek's staging of James Sherman's Beau Jest moved off-Broadway and was subsequently staged in hundreds of productions around the world. In 2008, Sherman released a film version of the play starring Lainie Kazan and Seymour Cassel.

In 1996, the Victory Gardens Playwrights Ensemble was created, a coming together of a diverse group of playwrights under a producing organization, virtually unheard of in American resident theaters. Founding members Steve Carter and James Sherman were joined by Claudia Allen, Dean Corrin, Lonnie Carter, Gloria Bond Clunie, John Logan, Nicholas Patricca, Douglas Post, Charles Smith, Jeffrey Sweet and Kristine Thatcher as the founding members of the company's Playwrights Ensemble.

On June 3, 2001, Victory Gardens received the Tony Award for Outstanding Regional Theatre. Winning the award made them one of five Chicago companies to be so honored, the other four being the Steppenwolf Theatre Company, Goodman Theatre, Chicago Shakespeare Theater, and Lookingglass Theatre Company.

== Move to Biograph Theatre, 2006 ==
In 2006, Victory Gardens underwent a $11.8 million renovation and opened a re-designed Biograph Theater at 2433 N. Lincoln Avenue as its new home. The Biograph, the notorious location of the ambush of gangster John Dillinger, opened with a party hosted by William L. Petersen, who played Dillinger at Victory Gardens at the beginning of his career.

The space at 2257 N. Lincoln has been redubbed the Victory Gardens Greenhouse and is mostly rented to a variety of non-profit companies including Shattered Globe and Remy Bumppo Theatre Company. In 2008 the Victory Gardens Greenhouse was sold to the Wendy and William Spatz Charitable Foundation. It is now the Greenhouse Theater Center.

In 2010, Victory Gardens named the studio space at the Biograph Theater the Richard Christiansen Theatre in honor of longtime Chicago Tribune theatre critic Richard Christiansen, author of the book A Theatre of Our Own.

== Criticism ==
=== 2020 resignation of volunteers ===
Chay Yew was named artistic director in 2011. In February 2012, Yew granted the original Playwrights Ensemble 'alumni' status and introduced a new ensemble of playwrights.

Yew announced his departure from Victory Gardens in December 2019. On May 5, 2020, then-executive director Erica Daniels was named Victory Gardens' executive artistic director. The Playwrights Ensemble announced their collective resignation in protest on May 22, citing a lack of transparency in Victory Gardens' search for a new artistic director. On June 8, in response to the resulting community backlash and the ongoing George Floyd protests, Daniels stepped down from her positions as executive director and Executive Artistic Director. The board of directors' chairman Steve Miller also stepped down from his position, but remained on the board.

The current acting managing director of Victory Gardens is Roxanna Conner; Charles E. Harris, II is the board president.

=== 2022 resignation of volunteers and petition ===
On July 6, 2022, former Ensemble playwright isaac gómez posted a letter to his Medium account entitled "We Resign." The letter called for the immediate resignation of the Victory Gardens' Board of Directors after their refusal to fill the role of executive director for over two years and plan to acquire additional property. The nine remaining full-time non-leadership staff members posted a statement of solidarity, calling for the resignation of the Board, on the official Victory Gardens social media pages. Those accounts were hijacked and posts subsequently removed while the staff were locked out of their social media accounts. VGT staff created an alternative Instagram account - The VGT Nine.

All resident artists departed the company and playwright Erika Dickerson-Despenza pulled the theatre's rights to perform her play cullud wattah through July 17, 2022. Dickerson-Despenza wrote in a public statement, "As a result of the white supremacist capitalist patriarchal values espoused by the board of directors at Victory Gardens Theater, I have pulled the production of my show, cullud wattah, effective immediately." The majority of the artists will still receive pay through the originally scheduled run dates.

On July 8, 2022, Actors' Equity Association issued a statement in support of the resigning artists, stating "Actors' Equity Association stands fully in support of our members, and their right to a safe work environment—as well as the right of all workers to work in a safe environment free from harassment, discrimination and bullying."

As of July 12, 2022, over 1,600 signatures from theater artists and administrators nationwide have been added to a Change.org petition started by the Chicago Inclusion Project staff. Signatories vow to not accept work at Victory Gardens unless artistic director Ken-Matt Martin is reinstated and the current Board of Directors resigns by July 18, 2022.

=== Board of Directors' response ===
On March 21, 2023, Victory Gardens' Board of Directors responded to the criticism from artists for the first time, stating that the criticisms of its actions reflected meaningfully uninformed judgments regarding the board's priorities and misinformation. For example, the media widely reported that the Board of Directors had yet to make an offer to a putative executive director. The board stated that it accepted its search committee's recommendations and made an offer to one of the recommended candidates who declined the role. It then negotiated and finalized an employment agreement with the second recommended choice, only to have the candidate delay acceptance for months, causing a significant delay in the hiring process. The board learned that the reason behind the delay was the second candidate and Victory Gardens' then-artistic director, Ken-Matt Martin, jointly hired a lawyer to rewrite their contracts to leverage Victory Gardens' dire need to fill the executive director role to their benefit. The board stated that Ken-Matt Martin and the candidate redrafted the contracts in a way that both contracts would be tied together and force Victory Gardens to offer both of them financial incentives that were detrimental to the organization.

== Playwrights Ensemble ==
Victory Gardens Playwrights Ensemble Alumni:

- Luis Alfaro
- Claudia Allen
- Lonnie Carter
- Steve Carter
- Gloria Bond Clunie
- Dean Corrin
- Nilo Cruz
- Philip Dawkins
- Marcus Gardley
- Ike Holter
- Samuel D. Hunter
- Naomi Iizuka
- Joel Drake Johnson
- John Logan
- Nicholas Patricca
- Douglas Post
- Tanya Saracho
- Laura Schellhardt
- James Sherman
- Charles Smith
- Jeffrey Sweet
- Kristine Thatcher

== Recent production history ==
- Right To Be Forgotten by Sharyn Rothstein. Chicago Premiere (May 2020)
- Dhaba on Devon by playwright Madhuri Shekar and directed by Artistic Director Chay Yew. World Premiere (March 2020)
- How to Defend Yourself by playwright Liliana Padilla and directed by Marti Lyons. Co-World Premiere with Actors Theatre of Louisville (January 2020)
- The First Deep Breath by playwright Lee Edward Colton II and directed by Steve H. Broadnax III. World Premiere (November 2019)
- Tiny Beautiful Things by author Cheryl Strayed, adapted by Nia Vardalos, and directed by Vanessa Stalling. Chicago Premiere (September 2019)
- If I Forget by playwright Steven Levenson and directed by Devon De Mayo. (June 2019)
- Cambodian Rock Band by playwright Lauren Yee, with Music By Dengue Fever, and directed by Marti Lyons. (April 2019)
- Pipeline by playwright Dominique Mori and directed by Cheryl Lynn Bruce. (February 2019)
- Rightlynd by playwright Ike Holter and directed by Lisa Portes. (November 2018)
- Indecent by playwright Paula Vogel and directed by Gary Griffin. (September 2018)
- Culture Clash: An American Odyssey by Culture Clash (October 2018)
- Mies Julie by playwright Yaël Farber and directed by Dexter Bullard. (May 2018)
- Lettie by playwright Boo Killebrew and directed by Chay Yew. (April 2018)
- Breach: a manifesto on race in America through the eyes of a black girl recovering from self-hate by playwright Antoinette Nwandu and directed by Lisa Portes. (February 2018)
- Fade by playwright Tanya Saracho and directed by Sandra Marquez. (November 2017)
- Fun Home by Jeanine Tesori (Music), Lisa Kron (Book & Lyrics), and directed by Gary Griffin. (September 2017)
- Native Gardens by playwright Karen Zacarías and directed by Marti Lyons. (June 2017)

== National Artistic Advisory Board ==
Victory Gardens has assembled several national theater artists who serve as artistic advisors and ambassadors. This board includes Luis Alfaro, Nilo Cruz, Eve Ensler, David Henry Hwang, Tony Kushner, John Logan, Craig Lucas, Sandra Oh, Suzan-Lori Parks, Jose Rivera, Anika Noni Rose, Sarah Ruhl, Jeanine Tesori, Paula Vogel, George C. Wolfe, and B.D. Wong.

== See also ==
- Chicago Theatre
