= Remy Bumppo Theatre Company =

American theater in Chicago, Illinois

Remy Bumppo Theatre Company is a theater in Chicago known for productions from playwrights such as George Bernard Shaw and Tom Stoppard. Marti Lyons serves as the company's Artistic Director.

== History ==
Remy Bumppo was founded in 1996 by Artistic Director Emeritus James Bohnen, Carol Loewenstern, and John Stoddard as Remy Bumppo LLC. The company was named after two of the founders' pets – Bohnen's dog Natty Bumppo (named after the James Fenimore Cooper character, Natty Bumppo) and Loewenstern's cat Remy (named after Rémy Martin cognac). In their first year, the company produced two plays, Night and Day by Tom Stoppard and The Seagull by Anton Chekhov.

On June 20, 2001, Remy Bumppo incorporated as a not-for-profit company under the name Remy Bumppo Theatre Company. At that time, they added five artistic associates: Annabel Armour, David Darlow, Shawn Douglass, Linda Gillum, and Nick Sandys. Artistic associates added since that time include Joe Van Slyke (added in 2005) and Gregory Anderson (2007). On August 13, 2007, at the age of 55, artistic associate Joe Van Slyke died after a lengthy struggle with cancer. Remy Bumppo dedicated their 2007–08 season to his memory.

In 2006, as part of the 10th year, Remy Bumppo was named a resident theatre company at the Tony Award winning Victory Gardens Theater. The space is now under different ownership and is known as the Greenhouse Theater Center. In 2018 the company moved out of the Greenhouse Theater Center and into Theater Wit, with an administrative offices in a separate location.

In April 2009, founder and artistic director James Bohnen announced his retirement from the company, to be effective at the end of the 2010–11 Season.

In October 2010, the company announced that Timothy Douglas would take over the artistic directorship beginning with the 2011–12 Season. Douglas resigned as artistic director effective January 31, 2012.

On February 1, 2012, Remy Bumppo's board of directors appointed artistic associate Nick Sandys as artistic director and he served in this position until 2021.

On July 12, 2021, Remy Bumppo's board of directors appointed Marti Lyons as artistic director.

== Production history ==
1996 Season:

Night and Day by Tom Stoppard; The Seagull by Anton Chekhov

1998 Season:

Waiting for Godot by Samuel Beckett; Rockabye by Samuel Beckett; Heartbreak House by George Bernard Shaw

1999 Season:

Road to Mecca by Athol Fugard

2000–01 Season:

Man and Superman by George Bernard Shaw; Hapgood by Tom Stoppard

2001–02 Season:

No Man's Land by Harold Pinter; Top Girls by Caryl Churchill

2002–03 Season:

The Secret Rapture by David Hare; Holiday by Philip Barry; Money by Edward Bulwer-Lytton

2003–04 Season:

Major Barbara by George Bernard Shaw; Some Americans Abroad by Richard Nelson; Hidden Laughter by Simon Grey

2004–05 Season: Chaos Theory... and Other Family Gatherings:

A Delicate Balance by Edward Albee; Arcadia by Tom Stoppard; Humble Boy by Charlotte Jones

2005–06 Season: Temptation:

Aren't We All by Frederick Lonsdale; Tartuffe by Molière; Power by Nick Dear

2006–07 Season: Lost Innocence:

The Best Man by Gore Vidal; The Real Thing by Tom Stoppard; Mrs. Warren's Profession by George Bernard Shaw; A Child's Christmas in Wales by Dylan Thomas; Remy Bumppo's thinkTank

2007–08 Season: Life, Love & Other Inventions:

Fiction by Steven Dietz; The Philadelphia Story by Philip Barry; Bronte by Polly Teale; On the Verge or the Geography of Yearning by Eric Overmyer; Remy Bumppo's thinkTank; Dickens in America by James DeVita

2008–09 Season: The Perils of Possession:

The Voysey Inheritance by Harley Granville-Barker, adapted by David Mamet; The Marriage of Figaro by Beaumarchais, adapted by Ranjit Bolt; thinkTank: American Ethnic by Usman Ally, Idris Goodwin, and Kelly Zen-Yie Tsai; Old Times by Harold Pinter

2009–10 Season: Friendships Tested:

Les Liaisons Dangereuses by Christopher Hampton, based on the novel by Choderlos de Laclos; The Island by Athol Fugard; Heroes by Gerald Sibleyras, translated by Tom Stoppard

2010–11 Season: Secret Lives, Public Lies:

The Goat or, Who Is Sylvia? by Edward Albee; The Importance of Being Earnest by Oscar Wilde; Night and Day by Tom Stoppard

2011–12 Season: The American Evolution:

Mourning Becomes Electra by Eugene O'Neill, adapted by Gordon Edelstein; Changes of Heart by Marivaux, translated by Stephen Wadsworth; Chesapeake by Lee Blessing

2012–13 Season: The Marriage Game:

Creditors by August Strindberg, adapted by David Greig; The Chimes adapted by Nick Sandys from the novel by Charles Dickens; You Never Can Tell by George Bernard Shaw; Seascape by Edward Albee

2013–14 Season: The Human Puzzle:

Our Class by Tadeusz Słobodzianek, English version by Ryan Craig; An Inspector Calls by J.B. Priestley, translated by Stephen Wadsworth; Northanger Abbey by Jane Austen, adapted by Tim Luscombe

2014–15 Season: Welcome to the Fun House:

Both Your Houses by Maxwell Anderson; The Clean House by Sarah Ruhl; Travesties by Tom Stoppard

2015–16 Season: Biting the Apple:

Love and Information by Carol Churchill; Fallen Angels by Noël Coward; The Life of Galileo by Bertold Brecht, translated by David Hare

2016–17 Season: An Age of Enlightenment:

Pirandello's Henry IV by Tom Stoppard; Pygmalion by George Bernard Shaw; Born Yesterday by Garson Kanin; Great Expectations by Charles Dickens, adapted by Tanika Gupta
