= Charles Smith (playwright) =

American dramatist

Charles Smith is a playwright and educator based in the Midwestern United States. He is known for his works staged at Victory Gardens Theater, and his teleplays on WMAQ-TV. He is the head of the Professional Playwriting Program at Ohio University.

== Early life ==
Smith grew up in the South Side, Chicago, and was one of seven children. Smith dropped out of high school and took factory jobs in Chicago plants. Then, he joined the US Army and was stationed in South Korea. After he was discharged, Smith returned to Chicago and started taking classes at Harold Washington College. With the mentorship of Edward Homewood, Smith began writing, and continued to graduate school, studying playwriting at the University of Iowa. Smith also participated in a residency with the New Dramatists in New York City.

== Career ==
Smith started at Victory Gardens Theater in 1985, working as an intern. Later, Smith would be a playwright in residence at Victory Gardens. Nine of Smith's plays have premiered at Victory Gardens, including Knock Me a Kiss, Freefall, and The Sutherland. Three of his plays, The Gospel According to James, Sister Carrie, and Les Trois Dumas, were commissioned by Indiana Repertory Theatre. His other works include Denmark, Pudd'nhead Wilson, Takunda, City of Gold, Jelly Belly, Young Richard, and Free Man of Color.

Smith's teleplay, Pequito, aired as part of the Chicago Playwright's Festival on WMAQ-TV. The series won a Chicago/Midwest Emmy Award in 1986. In 1987, Smith's teleplay Fast Break to Glory won Chicago/Midwest Emmys for Outstanding Achievements For Entertainment Program: For A Single Program; Outstanding Achievement For Individual Excellence: For Performers Who Appear On Camera; and Outstanding Achievement For Individual Excellence: For Individual Excellence Or Persons Whose Achievement Is Non-Performing (for director Roger Lee Miller).

Smith's 1995 play, Black Star Line, commissioned by the Goodman Theatre, was a Pulitzer Prize entrant.

Smith taught playwriting at Northwestern University before he began teaching at Ohio University, where he is a distinguished professor.

Smith's play, "The Reclamation of Madison Hemings", had its world premiere at the Indiana Repertory Theatre in Indianapolis, IN on March 25, 2021.

DePaul University Special Collections and Archives holds a collection of Smith's drafts and typescripts.
