= Festival of Cinema NYC =

Film festival in Queens, New York

- Location: Kew Gardens, Queens, New York City
- Founded: 2016
- Founded by: Jayson Simba
- Website: www.festivalofcinemanyc.com

Festival of Cinema NYC (previously the Kew Gardens Festival of Cinema) is an international film festival founded in 2016 held in Forest Hills, Queens, New York City for ten days beginning on the first Friday of August. It was founded by festival director, Jayson Simba, as Kew Gardens Festival of Cinema taking place in Kew Gardens, Queens. Following its inaugural year in 2016, the festival was rebranded as Festival of Cinema NYC, moving to its new home in Forest Hills.

Since 2016, the festival has screened over 400 films from 40 different countries, by independent filmmakers.

Festiva of Cinema NYC was established to provide an alternative to Tribeca Film Festival and New York Film Festival according to The Wall Street Journal.
