= Jeff Award =

American theater award

- Awarded for: Excellence in Chicago theatre
- Country: United States
- Presented by: Jeff Awards Committee
- First award: 1968
- Website: www.jeffawards.org

The Joseph Jefferson Award, more commonly known informally as the Jeff Award, is given for theatre arts produced in the Chicago area. Founded in 1968, the awards are named in tribute to actor Joseph Jefferson, a 19th-century American theater star who, as a child, was a player in Chicago's first theater company. WBEZ called the Joseph Jefferson Awards, "Chicago theater’s biggest awards night."

Two types of awards are given: "Equity" (annual judging season August 1 to July 31) for work done under an Actors' Equity Association contract, and "Non-Equity" (annual judging season April 1 to March 31) for non-union work. Award recipients are determined by a secret ballot. The Equity awards are usually given to the largest playhouses.

== Award categories ==
In 2018, the committee merged the actor and actress performance categories, eliminating gender from consideration. Two awards are now awarded from each of the new performance categories, ensemble awards remain singular:

=== Equity Awards ===
Performance categories

- Outstanding Performer in a Principal Role in a Play
- Outstanding Performer in a Supporting Role in a Play
- Outstanding Performer in a Principal Role in a Musical
- Outstanding Performer in a Supporting Role in a Musical
- Outstanding Ensemble in a Play
- Outstanding Ensemble in a Musical or Revue
- Outstanding Solo Performance
- Outstanding Performer in a Revue

Show and technical categories

- Outstanding Production of a Play
- Outstanding Production of a Musical
- Outstanding Production of a Revue
- Outstanding Direction of a Play
- Outstanding Direction of a Musical
- Outstanding Direction of a Revue
- Outstanding Music Direction
- Outstanding Choreography
- Outstanding Fight Choreography
- Outstanding New Play
- Outstanding New Musical
- Outstanding Adaptation
- Outstanding Original Music in a Play
- Outstanding Scenic Design
- Outstanding Costume Design
- Outstanding Lighting Design
- Outstanding Sound Design
- Outstanding Projections/Video Design

Special categories

- Outstanding Artistic Specialization
- Special Jeff Award (Equity) (includes Lifetime Achievement Award as well as Award for Outstanding Stage Management)

Former

- Touring Production Award - formerly awarded to equity shows performed in, but produced outside of Chicago. Under some circumstances where a Chicago theater subscription season includes such a show, that show may be eligible for the other awards.

=== Non-Equity Awards ===
Performance categories

- Outstanding Performance in a Principal Role in a Play
- Outstanding Performance in a Supporting Role in a Play
- Outstanding Performance in a Principal Role in a Musical or Revue
- Outstanding Performance in a Supporting Role in a Musical or Revue
- Outstanding Ensemble in a Play
- Outstanding Ensemble in a Musical or Revue
- Outstanding Solo Performance

Show and technical categories

- Outstanding Production of a Play
- Outstanding Production of a Musical or Revue
- Outstanding Direction of a Play
- Outstanding Direction of a Musical or Revue
- Outstanding Music Direction
- Outstanding Choreography
- Outstanding New Work
- Outstanding Adaptation
- Outstanding Original Music in a Play
- Outstanding Scenic Design
- Outstanding Costume Design
- Outstanding Lighting Design
- Outstanding Sound Design

Special categories

- Outstanding Artistic Specialization
- Special Jeff Award (Non-Equity) (includes Lifetime Achievement Award as well as Award for Outstanding Stage Management)

== History ==
Originally chartered to recognize only Equity productions, the Jeff Awards established the Non-Equity Wing in 1973 to reward achievement in non-union theatre.

The Joseph Jefferson Awards Committee evolved in response to a search by Chicago actors for a way to honor local theatre talent. In 1968, the Midwest Advisory Committee of Actors' Equity appointed member Felix Shuman to find a means of gaining recognition for actors working in the city. Joined by actors Guy Barile, Aviva Crane and June Travis Friedlob, Shuman identified and recruited twenty-four individuals active in education, business and social affairs. These individuals originally met for a luncheon at the Ivanhoe Theatre and went on to become the Joseph Jefferson Awards Committee under the first Chairmanship of Henry G. Plitt. Among the original members were three theatre supporters who would be active Jeff members two decades later—Morton Ries, Judith Sagan and Joseph Wolfson. The charter of the Jeff Committee today continues to honor excellence in the Chicago theatre community.

The first annual Jeff Awards ceremony was held in the Guildhall of the Ambassador West Hotel on October 6, 1969. It was attended by 175 people. Six awards were bestowed on the productions of seven theatres. In 1973 the Awards night was first telecast by CBS. During that same year, the Jeff Committee extended its coverage and recognition to include the productions of non-Equity theatres through the creation of a Non-Equity Wing of the Joseph Jefferson Awards Committee. Only five non-Equity theatres had productions judged in that first season, and three awards were presented the following fall. Currently these awards are given at a separate Non-Equity Wing Awards Night each spring.

The Chicago Tribune said in 2025 that the number of Jeff Award nominations had ballooned in recent years.

== Selection committee ==
The current Joseph Jefferson Committee consists of up to 55 members who come to the committee with an academic background in theatre, significant professional experience, a history of theatre involvement, and/or years of consistent theatre attendance in Chicago and in other major theatre capitals of the world. A volunteer, non-profit organization, The Jeff Committee does not have specific terms for its members. However, members must meet specific judging standards and can vote on the final ballot each season only if they have met their responsibilities for that complete year. While many of the judges have retained long-standing membership histories, a few rotate off each year as new members are invited to join the committee.

== Nomination ==
Each year at the request of the theaters, the members of Jeff Committee see the Jeff-eligible, locally produced shows. They nominate and eventually select recipients "for outstanding achievement" in the following categories: Production, Director, Actor and Actress in a Principal Role, Actor and Actress in a Supporting Role, in the two categories of Plays and Musicals. Awards are also given for Production, Direction, Actor and Actress in a Revue, and Cameo Performance, as well as Ensemble, Choreography, Scenic Design, Lighting Design, Costume Design, Original Music, Musical Direction, Sound Design, New Work and Adaptation. Two general types of awards are given in each category: "Jeff Awards" are for work done under an Actors' Equity Association contract, while "Non-Equity Jeff Awards" are for non-union work. On occasion, special awards are given for achievements, accomplishments, or services in other areas of the theatre. Award recipients are determined by secret ballot.

The Equity Awards are available to theater companies within 45 miles of the intersection of State and Madison streets. The Non-Equity Awards are available only to companies within the city limits of Chicago.

== Criticism ==
The Jeff Awards and Committee have been criticized by Chicago theater professionals, specifically those in the non-Equity sector, for not recognizing critically acclaimed productions and seeming to not be willing to reward daring works in Chicago theater. In a more outspoken criticism of the awards, Time Out Chicago has published a "They Wuz Robbed" feature for both the non-Equity and Equity nominations.

In 2026, over 25 non-Equity theatres announced that they would no longer participate in the Jeff Awards, following the Non-Equity awards ceremony in which a director who had been accused of abuse won Best Director.

== Notable awardees ==
=== Equity recipients ===
Joseph Jefferson Award for an Outstanding Actor in a Principal Role in a Musical

- 1974: Robert LuPone in The Tooth of Crime – Goodman Theatre
- 1979: John Reeger in Funeral March for a One-Man Band – St. Nicholas Theater Company
- 1982: David Rounds in Herringbone – St. Nicholas Theater Company
- 1985: Mark Jacoby in Nine – Candlelight Dinner Playhouse
- 1996: Anthony Crivello in The House of Martin Guerre – Goodman Theatre
- 1998: Brian Stepanek in Me and My Girl – Drury Lane Theatre
- 2003: Richard Kind in Bounce – Goodman Theatre
- 2007: David Hess in Shenandoah – Marriott Theatre
- 2008: John Cudia in Les Misérables - Marriott Theatre
- 2014: Matthew Brumlow in Hank Williams: Lost Highway – American Blues Theater
- 2016: Nathaniel Stampley in Man of La Mancha -- Marriott Theatre

Joseph Jefferson Award for an Outstanding Actor in a Principal Role in a Play

- 1971: Lee Pelty in Fiddler on the Roof – Candlelight Dinner Playhouse
- 1974: Mark Medoff in When You Comin' Back, Red Ryder? – First Chicago Center
- 2013: Michael Shannon in Simpatico – A Red Orchid Theatre
- 2022: Sean Hayes in Good Night, Oscar -- Goodman Theatre
