= La Grange Highlands, Illinois =

- Unincorporated community
- Location within Chicago metropolitan area
- Coordinates: 41.797936°N 87.876205°W
- Country: United States
- State: Illinois
- County: Cook
- Township: Lyons

Area
  - Total: 1.03 sq mi (2.68 km^{2})
  - Land: 1.03 sq mi (2.68 km^{2})
  - Water: 0 sq mi (0.00 km^{2})
- Elevation: 676 ft (206 m)

Population (2010)Estimated from Census data by subtracting neighbouring villages' populations from the ZIP Code's population
  - Total: 3,789
  - Density: 3,660/sq mi (1,414/km^{2})
- Time zone: UTC-6 (Central (CST))
  - Summer (DST): UTC-5 (CDT)
- ZIP Code: 60525
- Area code: 708
- Website: lhcivic.com

La Grange Highlands is an unincorporated community south of La Grange in Cook County, Illinois, United States. Located near I-294 and I-55, the town is bordered by Countryside, Indian Head Park, La Grange, and Western Springs. It primarily contains residential properties, with very few businesses within its boundaries. Despite being unincorporated it contains a firehouse from the Pleasantview Fire Protection District, which serves LaGrange Highlands and neighboring communities. LaGrange Highlands School District 106 serves students K-12, and Lyons Township High School is the public high school.
