= Placerville, Colorado =

Census-designated place in San Miguel County, CO, USA

- Census-designated place
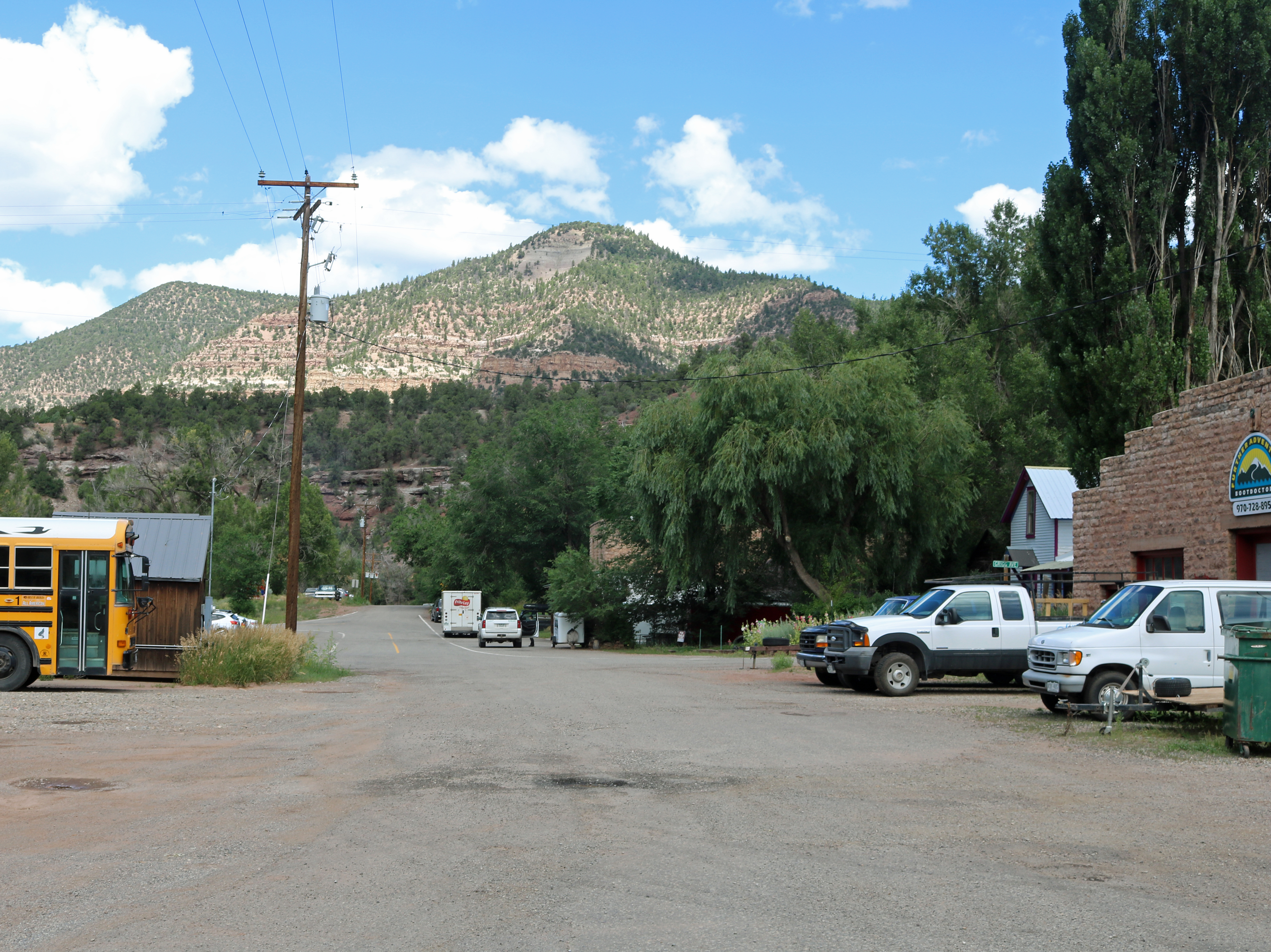
- Front Street in Placerville.

- Location of the Placerville CDP in the State of Colorado
- Coordinates: 38°00′05″N 108°01′52″W
- Country: United States
- State: Colorado
- County: San Miguel

Government
  - Type: Unincorporated community

Area
  - Total: 0.757 sq mi (1.961 km^{2})
  - Land: 0.757 sq mi (1.961 km^{2})
  - Water: 0 sq mi (0.000 km^{2})
- Elevation: 7,415 ft (2,260 m)

Population (2020)
  - Total: 362
  - Density: 478/sq mi (185/km^{2})
- Time zone: UTC-7 (MST)
  - Summer (DST): UTC-6 (MDT)
- ZIP Code: 81430
- Area code: 970
- GNIS feature ID: 2805925

Placerville is a census-designated place (CDP) and post office in and governed by San Miguel County, Colorado, United States. The Placerville post office has the ZIP Code 81430 (post office boxes). At the United States Census 2020, the population of the Placerville CDP was 362.

== History ==
Placerville was originally established as a small mining camp, named after the placer gold mines located on the San Miguel River and Leopard Creek. The location became known as Old Placerville after the Rio Grande Southern Railroad constructed a depot and several passing sidings west of the original settlement, calling it Placerville.

A. B. Frenzel discovered vanadium-bearing sandstone near Placerville in the late 1890s. The ore was in strataform bodies in the Entrada Sandstone (Jurassic) east of the town. The principal mineral was roscoelite, with minor montroseite and carnotite. By the fall of 1899, development was described as "of the most superficial character," although Frenzel had driven one tunnel 18 feet into the rock. By 1901–1902, Frenzel was excavating several thousand tons intended for shipment to Europe. Most of the Placerville ore was less than 3% vanadium, too low grade to pay for shipment to Europe, so in 1905 the Vanadium Alloys Co. built an ore-processing mill southeast of Placerville to recover the metal as ferro-vanadium, which it sold. At least five mines were active at one time, and by 1919 the two ore mills at Placerville were producing 30% of the world's vanadium. Through 1940, the mines produced about 3.7 million pounds of vanadium.

The Placerville Schoolhouse, a one-room schoolhouse, operated from 1908 to 1960.

In 1909, the failure of the Trout Lake Dam caused the flooding of Placerville as well as Sawpit and Newmire.

Although carnotite was recognized as a minor constituent of the ore since its discovery, the amount was small, and no assays were made of the uranium content of the ore until World War II. Beginning about 1950, the small uranium content of the ore was also recovered from the ore.

== Geography ==
The Placerville CDP has an area of 485 acres (1.961 km^{2}), all land.

=== Climate ===
According to the Köppen Climate Classification system, Placerville has a warm-summer humid continental climate, abbreviated "Dfb" on climate maps. The hottest temperature recorded in Placerville was 95 °F (35.0 °C) on July 23, 2020, and June 12–13, 2021, while the coldest temperature recorded was −17 °F (−27.2 °C) on February 2, 2011, and January 15, 2013.

Climate data for Placerville, Colorado, 1991–2020 normals, extremes 2008–present
Month	Jan	Feb	Mar	Apr	May	Jun	Jul	Aug	Sep	Oct	Nov	Dec	Year
Record high °F (°C)	62 (17)	64 (18)	72 (22)	80 (27)	87 (31)	95 (35)	95 (35)	93 (34)	92 (33)	86 (30)	71 (22)	63 (17)	95 (35)
Mean daily maximum °F (°C)	40.1 (4.5)	42.6 (5.9)	51.6 (10.9)	58.2 (14.6)	67.9 (19.9)	79.8 (26.6)	83.0 (28.3)	79.7 (26.5)	73.9 (23.3)	61.8 (16.6)	49.8 (9.9)	40.4 (4.7)	60.7 (16.0)
Daily mean °F (°C)	26.3 (−3.2)	29.2 (−1.6)	36.9 (2.7)	43.2 (6.2)	51.4 (10.8)	62.2 (16.8)	66.7 (19.3)	64.4 (18.0)	57.9 (14.4)	45.8 (7.7)	34.3 (1.3)	26.4 (−3.1)	45.4 (7.4)
Mean daily minimum °F (°C)	12.5 (−10.8)	15.7 (−9.1)	22.3 (−5.4)	28.3 (−2.1)	34.9 (1.6)	44.6 (7.0)	50.3 (10.2)	49.1 (9.5)	41.9 (5.5)	29.8 (−1.2)	18.8 (−7.3)	12.3 (−10.9)	30.0 (−1.1)
Mean minimum °F (°C)	−4.7 (−20.4)	−3.2 (−19.6)	5.9 (−14.5)	14.2 (−9.9)	24.2 (−4.3)	32.4 (0.2)	42.4 (5.8)	42.6 (5.9)	30.4 (−0.9)	16.5 (−8.6)	4.7 (−15.2)	−6.6 (−21.4)	−9.1 (−22.8)
Record low °F (°C)	−17 (−27)	−17 (−27)	−6 (−21)	4 (−16)	19 (−7)	29 (−2)	34 (1)	32 (0)	24 (−4)	2 (−17)	−12 (−24)	−16 (−27)	−17 (−27)
Average precipitation inches (mm)	1.42 (36)	1.53 (39)	1.83 (46)	1.61 (41)	1.83 (46)	0.81 (21)	2.47 (63)	2.56 (65)	2.52 (64)	2.17 (55)	1.62 (41)	1.15 (29)	21.52 (546)
Average snowfall inches (cm)	13.1 (33)	12.5 (32)	13.2 (34)	9.3 (24)	1.3 (3.3)	0.1 (0.25)	0.0 (0.0)	0.0 (0.0)	0.3 (0.76)	2.6 (6.6)	10.2 (26)	13.6 (35)	76.2 (194.91)
Average extreme snow depth inches (cm)	13.8 (35)	17.2 (44)	10.6 (27)	4.1 (10)	1.4 (3.6)	0.0 (0.0)	0.0 (0.0)	0.0 (0.0)	0.0 (0.0)	2.3 (5.8)	6.1 (15)	10.9 (28)	18.3 (46)
Average precipitation days (≥ 0.01 in)	7.6	8.4	8.6	8.8	7.4	4.5	9.6	13.6	9.8	7.0	6.2	7.9	99.4
Average snowy days (≥ 0.1 in)	6.6	7.5	6.6	4.5	0.8	0.1	0.0	0.0	0.3	1.3	4.1	6.1	37.9
Source 1: NOAA
Source 2: National Weather Service (mean maxima and minima, snow depth 2008-2022)

== Demographics ==
Placerville CDP, Colorado
Year	Pop.	±%
2020	362	—
Source: United States Census Bureau

The United States Census Bureau defined the Placerville CDP for the United States Census 2020.

== Transportation ==
Placerville is part of Colorado's Bustang network. It is on the Durango-Grand Junction Outrider line.

== Education ==
It is in the Telluride School District.

== See also ==
- List of census-designated places in Colorado
