= Schimek =

Schimek is the Germanized spelling of Šimek, a Slavic pet form of the personal name Šimon. Notable people with the surname include:

- Alfred Schimek (1897–1980), American architect
- DiAnna Schimek (born 1940), American politician
- Otto Schimek (1925–1944), Austrian soldier

== See also ==
- Shimek/Simek, a similar name with the same origin
- The Schimeck Family, a 1926 German silent film
