= Indian Head Park, Illinois =

- Village
- Seal

- Location of Indian Head Park in Cook County, Illinois.

- Location within Greater Chicago Location within Illinois Location within the United States
- Coordinates: 41°46′7″N 87°53′51″W
- Country: United States
- State: Illinois
- County: Cook
- Township: Lyons

Government
  - President: Amy Jo Wittenberg
  - Village President: Amy Jo Wittenberg

Area
  - Total: 0.94 sq mi (2.43 km^{2})
  - Land: 0.93 sq mi (2.41 km^{2})
  - Water: 0.0077 sq mi (0.02 km^{2})

Population (2020)
  - Total: 4,065
  - Density: 4,369.8/sq mi (1,687.17/km^{2})
- Time zone: UTC-6 (CST)
  - Summer (DST): UTC-5 (CDT)
- ZIP Code(s): 60525
- Area code: 708
- FIPS code: 17-37257
- Wikimedia Commons: Indian Head Park, Illinois
- Website: www.indianheadpark-il.gov

Indian Head Park is a village in Cook County, Illinois, United States, slightly north of the intersection of Interstate 294 and Interstate 55. The village is south of Western Springs, west of Countryside, north and east of Burr Ridge. Per the 2020 census, the population was 4,065. The village's ZIP code is 60525 (La Grange).

== History ==
The first Democratic Convention of Cook County was held in the area in 1835. At that time, Indian Head Park was closer to the center of the county, as Cook County then encompassed all of present-day DuPage and parts of Will and Lake counties. During that time the area was known as Lyonsville.

Just north of the village, now on the site of the Timber Trails subdivision, is one of the last camps of the Potawatomi Indians in Illinois.

The Lyonsville Congregational Church on the corner of Joliet and Wolf roads was once a stop on the Underground Railroad.

The Village of Indian Head Park was incorporated on August 4, 1959.

On October 27, 2011, Kelli O'Laughlin, a 14-year-old freshman at Lyons Township High School, was murdered. She was stabbed to death in an apparent burglary. This is believed to be the first murder in Indian Head Park history.

== Geography ==
According to the 2021 census gazetteer files, Indian Head Park has a total area of 0.94 square miles (2.43 km^{2}), of which 0.93 square miles (2.41 km^{2}) (or 99.15%) is land and 0.01 square miles (0.03 km^{2}) (or 0.85%) is water.

== Demographics ==
Historical population
Census	Pop.	Note	%±
1960	385		—
1970	473		22.9%
1980	2,915		516.3%
1990	3,503		20.2%
2000	3,685		5.2%
2010	3,809		3.4%
2020	4,065		6.7%
U.S. Decennial Census; 2010 2020

=== Racial and ethnic composition ===
Indian Head Park village, Illinois – Racial and ethnic composition Note: the US Census treats Hispanic/Latino as an ethnic category. This table excludes Latinos from the racial categories and assigns them to a separate category. Hispanics/Latinos may be of any race.
Race / Ethnicity (NH = Non-Hispanic)	Pop 2000	Pop 2010	Pop 2020	% 2000	% 2010	% 2020
White alone (NH)	3,486	3,392	3,481	94.60%	89.05%	85.63%
Black or African American alone (NH)	31	63	102	0.84%	1.65%	2.51%
Native American or Alaska Native alone (NH)	1	1	4	0.03%	0.03%	0.10%
Asian alone (NH)	73	113	129	1.98%	2.97%	3.17%
Pacific Islander alone (NH)	1	1	0	0.03%	0.03%	0.00%
Other race alone (NH)	3	1	7	0.08%	0.03%	0.17%
Mixed race or Multiracial (NH)	18	44	61	0.49%	1.16%	1.50%
Hispanic or Latino (any race)	72	194	281	1.95%	5.09%	6.91%
Total	3,685	3,809	4,065	100.00%	100.00%	100.00%

=== 2020 census ===
As of the 2020 census, there were 4,065 people living in the village. The median age was 54.9 years; 16.1% of residents were under the age of 18 and 32.2% were 65 years of age or older. For every 100 females, there were 82.8 males, and for every 100 females age 18 and over, there were 79.9 males age 18 and over.

100.0% of residents lived in urban areas, while 0.0% lived in rural areas.

There were 1,831 households, and 984 families, in Indian Head Park. Of all households, 21.5% had children under the age of 18 living with them, 43.8% were married-couple households, 15.6% were households with a male householder and no spouse or partner present, and 37.5% were households with a female householder and no spouse or partner present. About 37.8% of all households were made up of individuals, and 23.9% had someone living alone who was 65 years of age or older.

There were 1,940 housing units, with 5.6% vacant. The homeowner vacancy rate was 1.5% and the rental vacancy rate was 7.0%. The population density was 4,333.69 inhabitants per square mile (1,673.25/km^{2}), and the housing unit density was 2,068.23 per square mile (798.55/km^{2}).

=== Income and poverty ===
The median income for a household in the village was $88,496, and the median income for a family was $123,032. Males had a median income of $76,577 versus $43,375 for females. The per capita income for the village was $53,926. About 2.3% of families and 3.0% of the population were below the poverty line, including 1.3% of those under age 18 and 7.6% of those age 65 or over.

== Government ==
The Village President of Indian Head Park is Amy Jo Wittenberg. Indian Head Park is in Illinois's 3rd congressional district.

== Notable people ==
- David McAfee (1947–2005), member of the Illinois House of Representatives from 1991 to 1995. He was a resident of Indian Head Park.
- Gabrielle Walsh (born 1989), actress. She was a childhood resident of Indian Head Park.
