= District 105 =

District 105 may refer to:

- Pennsylvania House of Representatives, District 105
- Pontiac William Holliday School District 105
- LaGrange School District 105
