= LiveText =

LiveText Inc.
- LiveText, Inc.
- Type: Incorporation
- Industry: Computer software
- Founded: 1997
- Defunct: 2017
- Fate: Merged with TaskStream-Tk20
- Headquarters: 1 W. Harris Ave., La Grange, Illinois
- Area served: Worldwide
- Website: livetext.com

LiveText was an American browser-based e-portfolio and assessment management web application. Founded in 1997, LiveText served over 500 national and international colleges and universities.

In 2016 LiveText launched a new platform for academy and self-discovery called Via. The platform captures and records events and the user's learning experiences both inside and outside of the classroom to let users reflect on their study processes.

In September 2017 LiveText announced they were merging with TaskStream-Tk20.
