= Park Junior High School =

- Location within Chicago metropolitan area Location within Illinois Location within the United States
- Former names: Nazareth Academy and Motherhouse for the Sisters of Saint Joseph

General information
- Status: Completed
- Location: 333 N. Park Road; La Grange Park, Illinois 60526; United States
- Coordinates: 41.8199°N 87.8804°W
- Construction started: 1901; 125 years ago
- Completed: 1910; 116 years ago

Technical details
- Floor count: 3

Website
- www.dist102.k12.il.us/o/pjhs

Park Junior High School is a Junior high school in La Grange Park, Illinois. The current student populace is around seven hundred students.

== History ==
The building which is now Park was originally the girls' school for Nazareth Academy, which has since become co-ed and moved just a few blocks down Ogden Avenue. In 1974, District 102 purchased the building and renovated it; Park opened in the following year, named after the street bordering its west side, Park avenue, replacing its old 7th & 8th grade school, Oak Avenue School, located a few blocks away from Memorial Park, La Grange Park. Since then the Oak Avenue School building has been sold to the American Nuclear Society, who now uses it as their headquarters.

Four elementary schools feed into Park: Ogden Avenue School in La Grange; Cossitt School in La Grange; Forest Road Elementary School in La Grange Park; and Congress Park Elementary School in Brookfield. After graduating from Park, students typically attend Lyons Township High School in nearby La Grange or Nazareth Academy, also in La Grange.

== School Administration ==
The current principal is Mr. Jerome Green, who has attained the principalship since 2023, with the assistant principal being Mrs. Lynette Campbell.

== Art Gallery ==
Park currently houses the esteemed Nettie J. McKinnon Art Collection, which has been loaned to the school by the district for a twenty-five-year period. The collection started as a school legacy project at nearby Oak School in the 1940s, but when evaluated in 2002, it was found to be worth more than $1.4 million. The gallery is said to only hold artwork worth over $10 thousand. Park is only one of two elementary schools in the entire United States to have a full, private art collection. During the 1929-1930 school year 7th and 8th graders sold magazines to the community at large, and the profits from those sales were used to purchase artwork for Oak Avenue School. The paintings were in Oak Avenue School until 1975, where they were moved to Ogden Avenue School, being moved to its current location in 1978.
