= LaGrange Elementary School District 102 =

School district in Illinois, United States

La Grange Elementary School District 102 is a public school district in Cook County, Illinois, headquartered in La Grange.

It covers parts of La Grange, La Grange Park, and Brookfield. The district is composed of Ogden Avenue Elementary School in La Grange, opened in 1910 (named after the street on which it is located), Cossitt Elementary School in La Grange (opened 1883 and also named after the street on which it is located), Forest Road Elementary School in La Grange Park, and Congress Park Elementary School in Brookfield (both opened in 1950 to accommodate the population growth in the area after World War II), all of which serve grades K-6; and Park Junior High School in La Grange Park, which serves grades 7–8. Students then typically attend Lyons Township High School, which has two campuses, in La Grange and Western Springs, Illinois (Lyons Township High School District 204), and serves grades 9 through 12.

== History ==
Kyle Schumacher became the superintendent in 2014. He was previously with Telluride School District R-1.

In 2020 the district opened a "Welcome Center" at Park Junior High School so disadvantaged social groups may connect with the district community.

== Schools ==
Forest Road

Forest Road School teaches grades 1–6. The mascot for Forest Road is the Roadrunner, & the school colours are blue & yellow. Forest Road School is two levels, usually with grades 1–3 on the first level & grades 4–6 on the second level. The curriculum activities include Math, Language Arts, Social Studies, Reading, Science, Physical Education, Music, Art, & Spanish. Forest Road used to be split into Forest Road West & Forest Road East, but has since become Forest Road & Barnsdale.

Cossitt

Cossitt is a school located in the heart of La Grange that teaches grades K-6. Although the district is a La Grange district, Cossitt is the only school actually in La Grange. The school opened in 1883. The mascot is the tiger, thus the school colors being orange and black. There are three levels, with a basement gymnasium and two three and a half floor classrooms. This is a very large school holding around six hundred students. Before the great depression the school had a pool in the basement floor for use by students and the community on weekends, it has since been covered up to use as a multipurpose room. Accelerated Math and Reading, along with basic science and social studies, Spanish for grades 5 - 6, Music, Physical Education, and Art are among the classes at Cossitt. The school's playground was recently renovated as of Summer of 2016.

Congress Park

Congress Park is a school that teaches grades K-6. Their mascot is the Dolphin. It has 2 floors primarily consisting of 1-3 graders on the 1st floor and 4-6 graders on the second floor.

Ogden

Ogden is a school that teaches grades K-6. Their mascot is the Panther.

Barnsdale

Barnsdale is a kindergarten school that also holds the Allen P. Zak Science Center. Their mascot is the Owl. Barnsdale opened in 2007 after the split of Forest Road, the building formerly known as Forest Road East.

Park Junior High School

Park Junior High teaches grades 7–8. Their mascot is the Patriots, and the school colors are red, blue, and white. The school was opened in 1975, after the purchase of a Nazareth Academy, replacing the old junior high school, Oak Avenue School.
