= Alfred Schimek =

American architect

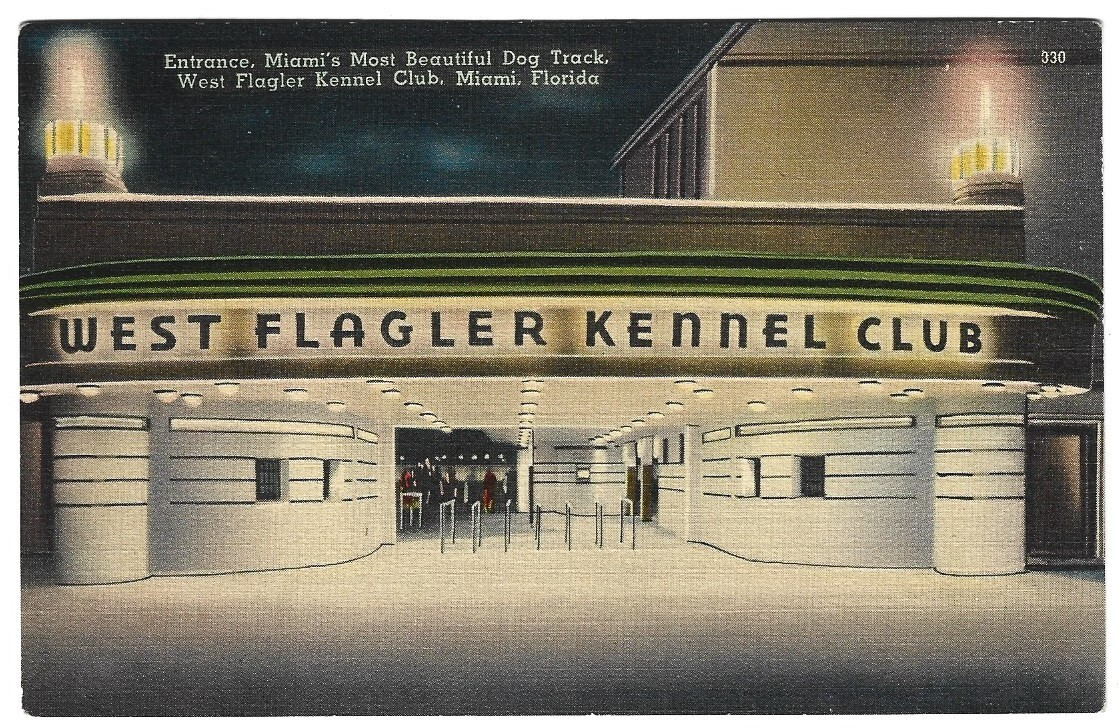
- The West Flagler Kennel Club in Miami, one of Schimek's notable projects.
- Born: Alfred Fisher Schimek; October 18, 1897
- Died: December 9, 1980 (aged 83)
- Other names: Alfred F. Schimek, A.F. Schimek
- Occupations: Architect, inventor, arts patron
- Years active: 1920s–1970s
- Known for: Mediterranean Revival, Art Deco, Illinois Society of Architects
- Notable work: The Permuy House, West Flagler Kennel Club, Broadview planned community
- Awards: 1930 Standard Sanitary Manufacturing Co. Award

Alfred F. Schimek (1897–1980) was an architect active in Illinois and South Florida during the early and mid-20th century. He was responsible for notable projects in each region over the course of his career spanning five decades and is known primarily for his residential architecture work. His designs are associated mostly with updated interpretations of traditional European styles, such as Mediterranean Revival, though he also designed in the contemporary Bauhaus-influenced Modernist Art Deco style. Schimek also served in the board leadership of organizations in each region including the Illinois Society of Architects and the Greater Miami Civic Theater. As an inventor Schimek filed US patents for spring suspension systems and original door mounting designs.

== Early life and career ==
Alfred Fisher Schimek, later known professionally as Alfred F. Schimek, was born on October 18, 1897, in Chicago, Illinois. In his early schooling he was drawn to creative and artistic fields, ultimately settling in architecture. At the age of 20 he was enlisted in the US Army during World War I where he held the rank of Private First Class. Schimek served from October 1917 to July 1919 and began his service at Fort Slocum New York before eventually going overseas to Brest, France, and returning from his tour aboard the USS Frederick.

Early in his architecture career Schimek worked for the firm Foltz & Brand for a time before opening his own practice in 1920 at the age of 22. In 1924 he gained early visibility when he entered and received an honorable mention in an architecture design contest through Country Home, the results of which were also published in Architectural Forum.

The following year he gained further visibility when he wrote the article “A Little Bit of France Transplanted to America” in The Concrete House Magazine which was distributed through the United States, Canada, and Cuba. In it Schimek showed the established European design aesthetic that he would become known for in South Florida and Chicago through the 1920s and 1930s. It also describes his hands-on approach to architecture, where he involved himself in teaching workers specialized stucco application, molding, and masonry techniques to achieve the characteristics associated with his designs.

During this period Schimek also served as a trustee to the Art Institute of Chicago.

== Move to South Florida ==
Shortly following the publication of his article in The Concrete House Magazine, Schimek relocated to South Florida at the age of 27 and was residing in Miami by the summer of 1925. Though living in Miami, the bulk of Schimek's work upon arriving was in the newly established and incorporated City of Coral Gables, an early planned community in the Mediterranean Revival style. Schimek worked with the Plainfield Realty & Investment Company and was hired to design about twelve early residences in the Mediterranean Revival style, one of which included The Permuy House by the Biltmore Hotel and Golf Course.

Following the Hurricane of 1926, Schimek became less active in Coral Gables and expanded to other parts of the Greater Miami area, such as Miami Beach, which is famed for its Art Deco architecture from that era. In the late 1920s Schimek was also active in the Greater Miami Civic Theater, where he contributed significantly as a member of its board of directors and frequently donated his time to design sets for plays. He also occasionally took on other roles such as Stage Manager and on one occasion performed as a part of the cast.

In 1930 Schimek was hired as the lead architect for a major development, a $100,000 contract to design the new Miami Kennel Club at West Flagler Street and Douglas Road. Known as the West Flagler Kennel Club, the venue opened later that year and was historic for being Miami's second dog racing track and Miami's first gambling and gaming center to feature Las Vegas-style casino slot machines. Dubbed "Miami's Most Beautiful Dogtrack," Schimek designed the Club in the Art Deco style popular at the time with glamorous entertainment locales. In addition to its scale, design, and gaming features, the project was also significant for using local Miami-area labor to stimulate economic growth during The Great Depression.

Later that year Schimek was one of two architects to win cash prizes in a nationwide design competition sponsored by Standard Sanitary Manufacturing Co. for better bathroom designs. According to The Miami News, the competition was judged by “prominent architects of New York, New Orleans, Boston, San Francisco and Chicago.” In 1932 Schimek won 6th Prize in another nationwide design contest, this time through The American Architect magazine (now Architectural Record).

== Return to Chicago and later career ==
By the end of the 1930s Schimek returned to Chicago. In 1937 he was chosen to be the architect for the Broadview planned community in Chicago where he used his recent experiences in South Florida, particularly Coral Gables, working within specific design styles. The development was by John C. Lindop Real Estate Inc. and spanned 333 homes. The homes were designed in French, English, and Colonial architecture styles. The project was a major undertaking with each home featuring between five and seven bedrooms and ranging in price between $7,000 and $10,000 for a total cost $2.6 million. In all, it was the largest development in the area since the Crash of 1929 eight years previously.

By the late 1930s Schimek would also re-embrace Art Deco architecture that he explored in Miami Beach. In 1939 Schimek filed a US patent for spring suspension system. In the 1940s he remained an active member of the American Legion (La Grand Post, No. 41) which he joined following his service in the First World War. He participated in a wave of recruitments of WWI veterans and enlisted again in the US Army to fight in World War II where he served for three years from 1942 to 1945. In the 1950s Schimek became highly active within the Illinois Society of Architects where he joined the leadership board and was elected Secretary for much of the decade before ascending to president.

He would also file and register US patents for original door mounting designs he made in the late 1950s and early 1960s. Through the 1960s he served as an executive in several firms relating to architecture, construction, and interior design before retiring in the 1970s.

Schimek died on December 12, 1980, in La Grange, Illinois, at the age of 83.

== Legacy ==
Schimek's architecture career spanned over fifty years in which time he won design awards, designed several regionally significant projects, and was covered by major media outlets including the Chicago Tribune, Miami Herald, and the Miami News as well as architecture magazines such as Concrete House Magazine, Country Home, Architectural Forum, and American Architect Magazine.

As Secretary and later President of the Illinois Society of Architects, Schimek was a leading force within the organization during the period when Chicago Architecture was an influential design center within the United States mid-century period. The I.S.A. was itself a prominent architecture organization that was founded in 1897 as Chicago Architects' Business Association, renamed the Illinois Society of Architects (I.S.A.) in 1914. It was the oldest independent state architecture organization in the United States when Schimek led it. Shortly after its 100th anniversary, it merged into the Association of Licensed Architects, its successor organization, in 1999 with much of its records now maintained by the Chicago History Museum. As a supporter of the arts, Schimek also served on the board of directors for the Greater Miami Civic Theater, one of the earliest theater venues in South Florida, in the 1920s. Also called the Civic Theatre of Greater Miami, the organization's mission was to "foster, encourage and promote the production, appreciation, understanding and practice of dramatic art and the allied arts of the theater." As such, the venue was credited with spearheading a socioeconomic approach to popularizing plays in the area during Schimek's involvement. Among their innovations was creating a membership system that entitled frequent-theater goers to additional benefits (such as attending rehearsals, readings, and exclusive gala functions) meant to facilitate the social interactions that were popular during the Jazz Age.

In 2021, one of Schimek's notable South Florida projects, The Permuy House, was designated a Local Landmark of the City of Coral Gables on Historical, Architectural, and Cultural grounds. Schimek designed the residence in 1925 in the Mediterranean Revival style that is closely identified with Coral Gables, a planned community. Schimek included a number of Mediterranean-European influences in the home's architecture including smooth stucco, archways, balusters, projecting and recessed planes and doorways, an ornamental medallion above the projecting entry bay, white oak flooring, as well as a pronounced chimney. He also added Caribbean influences that were unique to the property, such as imported Cuban floor tiles that were notable for pre-dating the arrival of the Cuban diaspora in South Florida. The home was completed in 1926, concurrently with the renown Biltmore Hotel, a National Historic Landmark in close proximity to the residence.

Having designed a dozen residences in the style throughout the 1920s, Schimek was one of the architects who significantly contributed to the early development of the city and its character before development froze after the 1926 Hurricane and subsequent Real Estate collapse. Schimek later applied this experience to his larger-scale work in the Broadview-area planned community, which was then the largest development in that region of Greater Chicago since the crash of 1929.

== Projects gallery ==
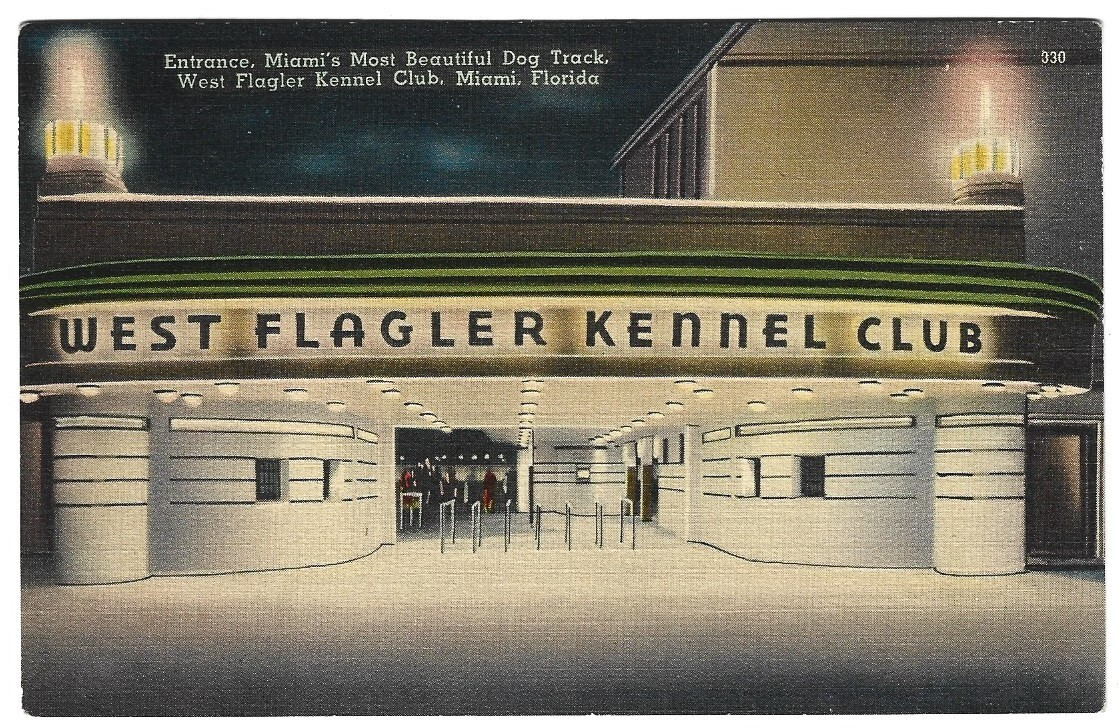
The West Flagler Kennel Club, designed in the Art Deco style, as seen in a vintage postcard c. 1941.

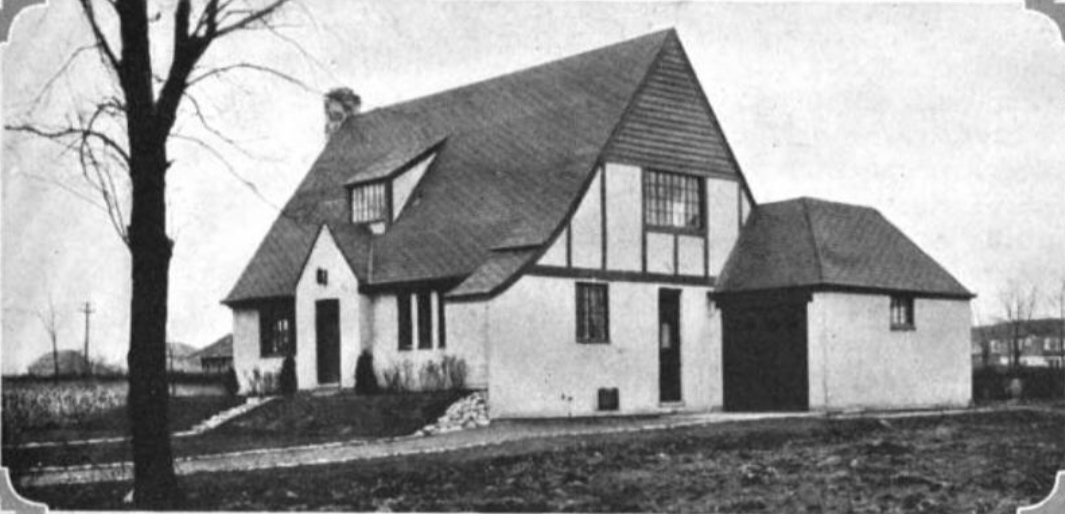
Front view of French-style home designed by Schimek in La Grange, Illinois, as seen in 1925.

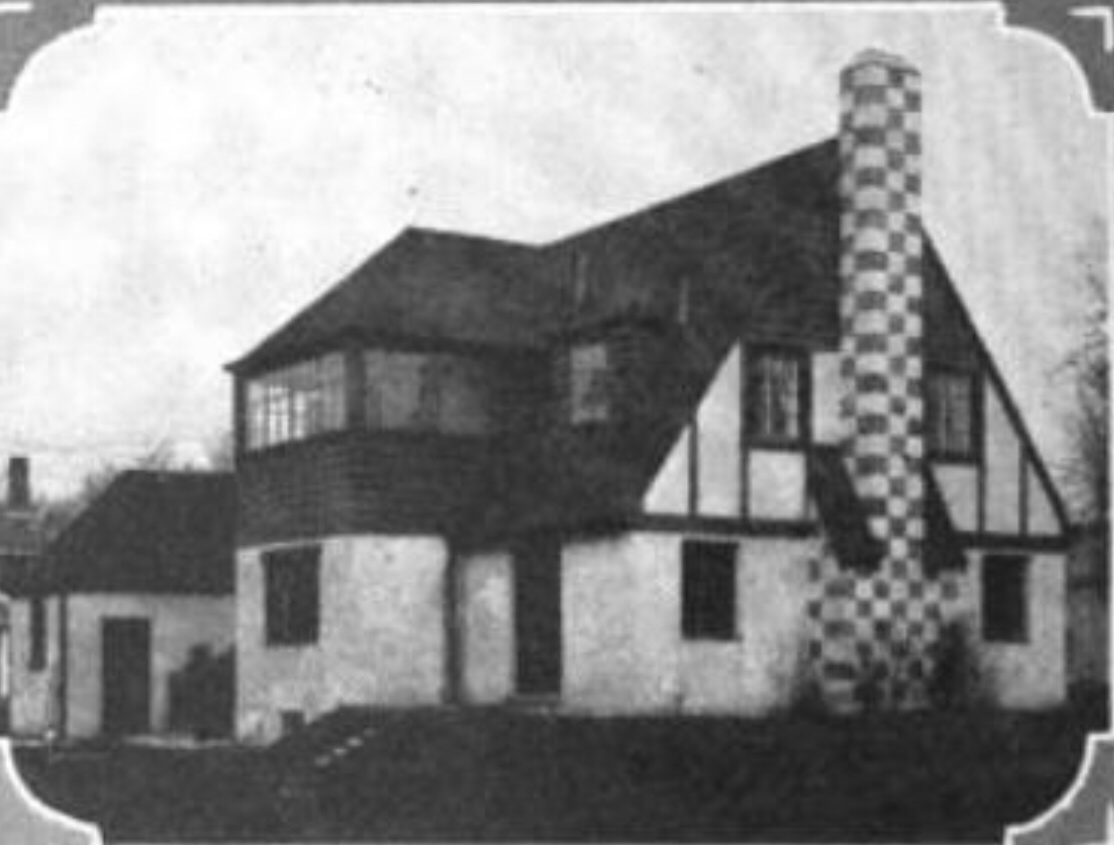
Rear view a French-style home designed by Schimek in La Grange, Illinois, as seen in 1925.

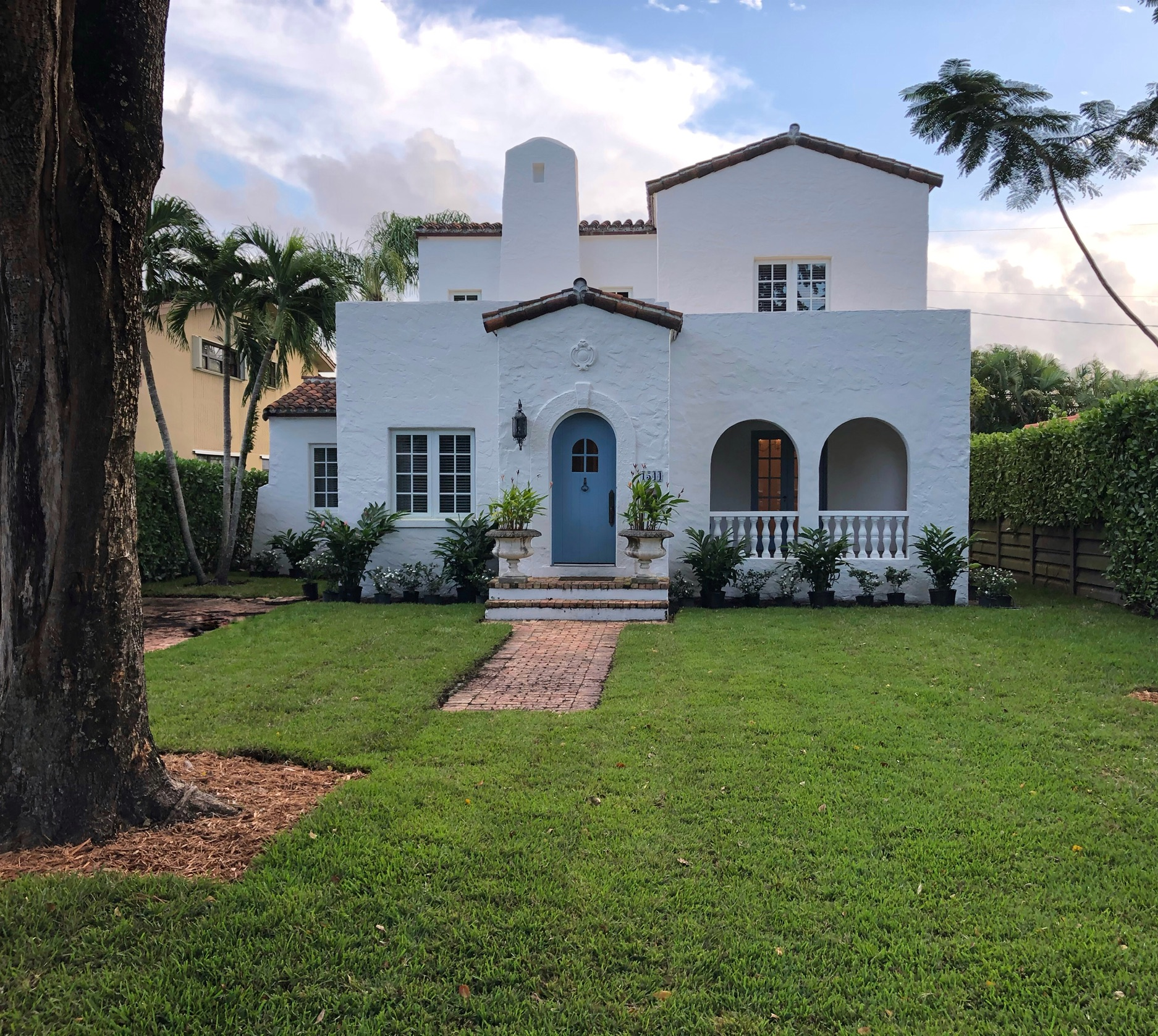
The Permuy House, a landmark of Coral Gables, Florida, as seen in 2020. Designed in the Mediterranean Revival style in 1925.
