= Placerville Schoolhouse =

1908 one-room schoolhouse in Colorado

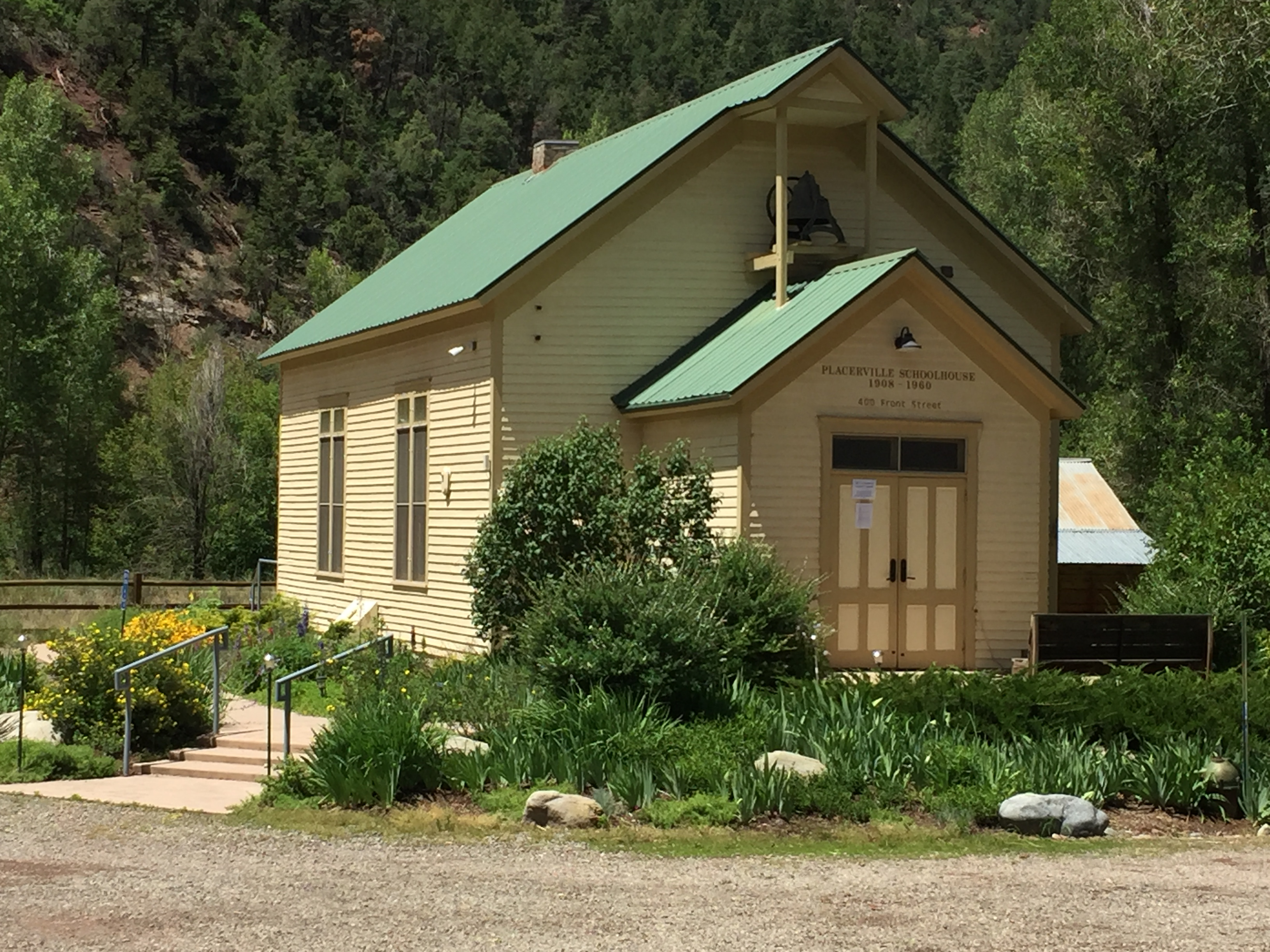

- Location within Colorado Location within the United States
- 38.017983°N 108.05458°W
- Location: Placerville, Colorado

History
- Built: 1908

The Placerville Schoolhouse in Placerville, Colorado (San Miguel County, Colorado) is a preserved one-room schoolhouse that operated as a school from 1908 to 1960.

A c. 1940 photo of the school, with flagpole and bell, is included in Fick's Colorado Mining.

A severe flood occurred in Placerville in 2009. In 2012 an incumbent San Miguel County commissioner, running for reelection, counted as one of the county's accomplishments the county's acquisition Placerville Schoolhouse, and their planning "to restore it to its historical significance, while making it available to Placer Valley folks as a community meeting space."

As of September 2022 there was online posting of the amenities included with rental and of usage policies. These showed it was indeed available at low cost: free for groups of less than 10 persons, $5/hour for larger groups, but $50 if more than 4 hours, and "$75/day will be charged for community based sale events, such as a Christmas bazaar, yard sale, or fund raising event." Scheduling of the space is by use of an online calendar, which shows several usages scheduled each week, on calendar running out about three months.
