= Eileen Lyons =

American politician (born 1941)

Member of the Illinois House of Representatives from the 82nd district
- In office January 2003 – January 2006
- Preceded by: Jim Meyer (redistricted)
- Succeeded by: Jim Durkin

Member of the Illinois House of Representatives from the 47th district
- In office January 1995 – January 2003
- Preceded by: David McAfee
- Succeeded by: Patti Bellock (redistricted)

Personal details
- Born: Eileen Lyons; July 3, 1941 (age 85) New York City, New York
- Party: Republican
- Education: Elmhurst College (BA)

Eileen Lyons (born July 3, 1941) is a former Republican member of the Illinois House of Representatives from 1995 until 2006.

== Biography ==
Born in New York City, New York, Lyons received her bachelor's degree in English from Elmhurst College. She lived in Western Springs, Illinois. Eileen is a mother to four daughters and grandmother to seven grandchildren.

In the 1994 general election, Lyons defeated two-term incumbent David McAfee in the Republican-leaning 47th district. Two years later, Lyons defended her seat successfully against a targeted effort by the Illinois Democratic Party on behalf of Mark Pera

During the 93rd General Assembly, she was an Assistant Minority Leader under Tom Cross.

Lyons opted not to run for reelection in the 2006 election. Jim Durkin, who served in the Illinois House from 1995 to 2003, chose to enter the race to succeed her. Lyons opted to resign from the Illinois House of Representatives midway through the 94th General Assembly effective January 5, 2006. Local Republicans leaders appointed Durkin to the vacancy. During the 2008 Republican Party presidential primaries, Lyons endorsed the presidential campaign of Rudy Giuliani.
