= Shimek =

Shimek is the Anglicized spelling of the Slavic surname Šimek. The name comes from a hypocorism of the name Šimon. Simek is a surname that may be either Anglicized spelling of Šimek, or directly a Slavic hypocorism of the name Simon. Notable people with the surname include:

== Shimek ==
- Bohumil Shimek (1861–1937), American naturalist and conservationist
- Liz Moeggenberg née Shimek (born 1984), American basketball player

== Simek ==
- Artie Simek (1916–1975), American calligrapher best known as a letterer for Marvel Comics
- Frank Simek (born 1984), American association football player
- Péter Simek (born 1980), Hungarian association football player
- Rudolf Simek (born 1954), Austrian philologian and historian

== See also ==
- Schimek, Germanized version of the name
- 14098 Šimek, an asteroid
- Shimek State Forest, Iowa, U.S.
