= Telluride School District =

Public school system in Colorado

Telluride School District R-1

Location
- San Miguel County, Colorado United States
- Coordinates: 37.9412°N 107.8195°W

District information
- Type: Public
- Grades: PreK–12
- Schools: 4
- NCES District ID: 0806870

Students and staff
- Students: 752
- Teachers: 62.05 (on FTE basis)
- Student–teacher ratio: 12.12:1

Other information
- Website: tellurideschool.org

Telluride School District (TSD) is a public school system headquartered in Telluride, San Miguel County in southwest Colorado. It consists of four schools, Telluride Elementary, Intermediate, Middle and High.

The district, entirely in San Miguel County, includes Telluride, Mountain Village, Ophir, Sawpit, and Placerville.

== History ==
Kyle Schumacher became superintendent in 2011.

On June 30, 2015, he left his post so he could become a superintendent of the LaGrange Elementary School District 102 in the Chicago area, in Illinois.
