= Šimek =

Šimek (feminine: Šimková) is a Czech, Slovak and Croatian surname. It is derived from the given name Šimon, a variant of Simon. The name also appears in the Anglicized form as Shimek and Simek, and in the Germanized form as Schimek. Notable people with the surname include:

- David Šimek (born 1998), Czech footballer
- Juraj Šimek (born 1987), Slovak-born Swiss ice hockey player
- Karlo Šimek (born 1988), Croatian footballer
- Miloslav Šimek (1940–2004), Czech comedian
- Miroslav Šimek (born 1959), Czech slalom canoer
- Radim Šimek (born 1992), Czech ice hockey player

== See also ==
- 14098 Šimek, an asteroid
