= Roscoelite =

Phyllosilicate mineral in the dioctahedral mica group

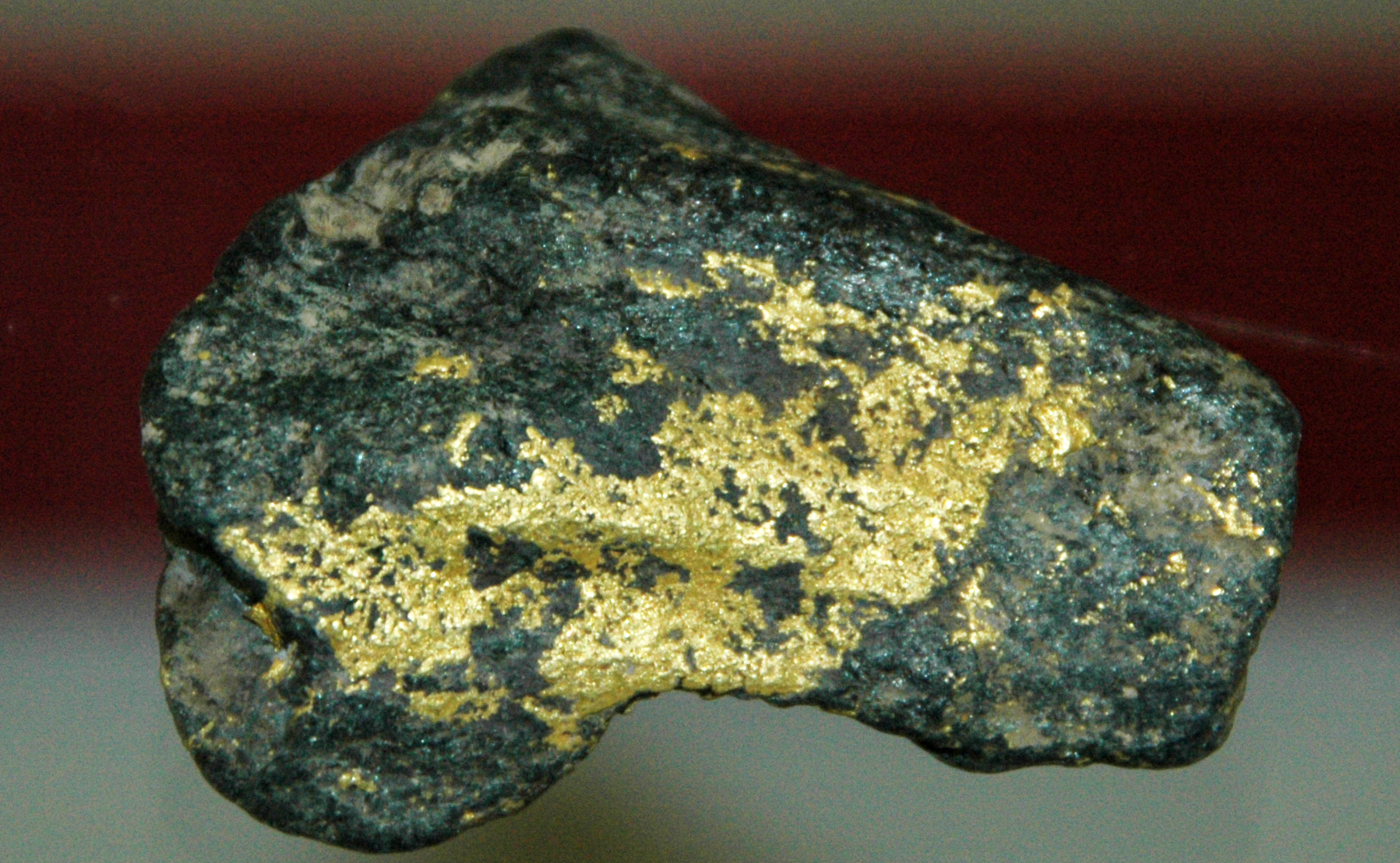
- Roscoelite and gold

General
- Category: Phyllosilicate minerals
- Group: Mica group, dioctahedral mica group
- Formula: K(V^{3+},Al,Mg)_{2}AlSi_{3}O_{10}(OH)_{2}
- IMA symbol: Rcl
- Strunz classification: 9.EC.15
- Crystal system: Monoclinic
- Crystal class: Prismatic (2/m) (same H-M symbol)
- Space group: C2/m

Identification
- Formula mass: 426.53 g/mol
- Colour: olive-green to green-brown
- Crystal habit: scales, fans, druses, rosettes, fibrous or felted aggregate.
- Cleavage: Perfect plane {0,0,1}
- Fracture: platy
- Mohs scale hardness: 1
- Lustre: pearly
- Diaphaneity: semi-transparent to translucent
- Specific gravity: 2.92 - 2.96
- Optical properties: Biaxial (-)
- Refractive index: nα=1.60 nβ=1.66 nγ=1.67
- Birefringence: δ =
- Pleochroism: olive green to green-brown
- Fusibility: loses water

Roscoelite is a green mineral from the mica group that contains vanadium. The chemical formula is K(V^{3+}, Al, Mg)_{2}AlSi_{3}O_{10}(OH)_{2}. Crystals of roscoelite take on the monoclinic form, and are from the 2/m point group. The appearance is semi transparent to translucent coloured olive brown to green brown. The lustre is pearly. The mineral shows pleochroism with X showing green-brown, and Y and Z axes showing olive-green colour. The mineral was named after Henry Enfield Roscoe who first produced vanadium metal.

== Chemical properties ==
Roscoelite is a muscovite with aluminium substituted with vanadium. Vanadium can also be substituted by magnesium, iron, or manganese.

== Physical properties ==
It is soft and the density is 2.93±0.01. The unit cell has dimensions

a = 526 pm
b = 909 pm
c = 1025 pm,

with an angle between axes of β=101.0°. The tetrahedral cation-oxygen atom distance is 164.1 pm, The distance from the cation to the oxygen in the octahedral plan is 202 pm.

== Formation ==
Two kinds of mineral deposits contain roscoelite, either gold-silver-tellurium low temperature epithermal deposits where it occurs along with quartz, fluorite, pyrite and carbonates, or oxidized low temperature uranium-vanadium ores in sedimentary rocks, where it occurs with corvusite, hewettite, carnotite and tyuyamunite. Roecoelite is considered a gangue mineral of no value when found with gold. However it has also been used as a vanadium ore.

In the Mt. Kare mine in New Guinea the mineral occurs with gold and is an important maker of gold deposits. The temperature of the geothermal fluid that deposited the roscoelite was from 127 to 167 °C (261 to 333 °F). The fluid contained a high level of salt and also contained carbon dioxide, methane, carbonyl sulfide and other minor amounts of rock forming elements.

== Occurrence ==
The mineral has been found in numerous places in US, Australia, Japan, Gabon, Fiji, New Guinea and Czech Republic. In the United States, it was the principal vanadium ore mineral at the mines at Placerville, Colorado. In Australia roscoelite has been found at Kalgoorlie, Radium Hill and the Kintore Open Cut at Broken Hill.
