= La Grange Public Library =

Coordinates: 41°48′44″N 87°52′12″W

The La Grange Public Library is a public library in La Grange, Illinois, US. It was founded in 1903 and is an original Carnegie Library. The original building was located at 75 S. La Grange Road and the current building is located across the street at the intersection of La Grange Road and Cossitt Avenue (10 W. Cossitt Avenue, La Grange, IL).

== Founding ==
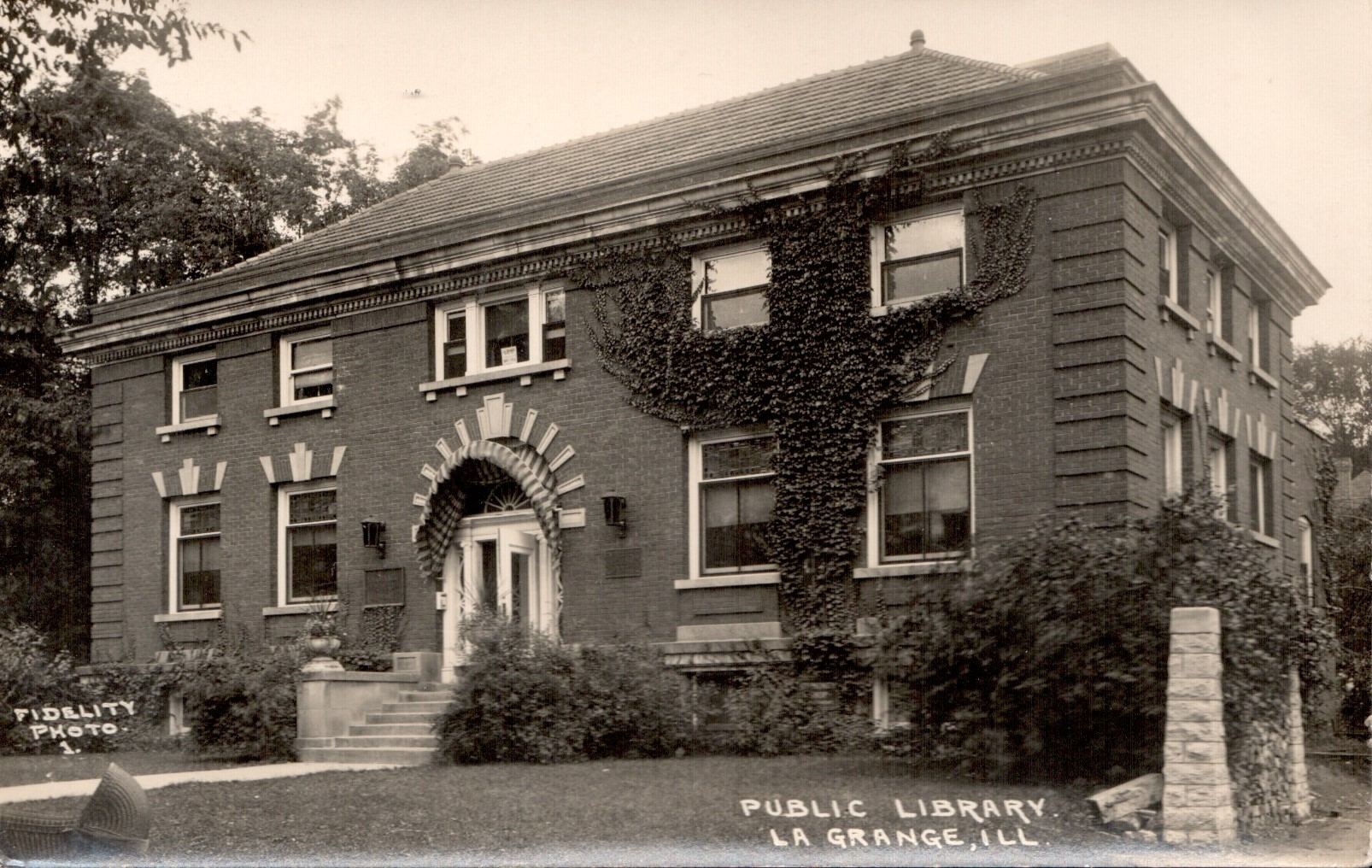
Photo of the original Andrew Carnegie funded library at 75 S. La Grange Road in the Newberry Library style

The library was founded in 1903 and opened to the public on January 10, 1905. The original library was built with a grant from Andrew Carnegie. Located in La Grange, Illinois, a southwest Chicago suburb, the original building stood at 75 South La Grange Road. A lending library was initially created by the La Grange Women's Club in 1896. Thanks to donations from local individuals, the lending library amassed over 500 books in seven years, which led to a plan to receive grant funding for a new building. The Women's Club was also instrumental in getting a library tax passed in 1901.

In 1903, the Village of La Grange received $12,500 for the construction of the building from Andrew Carnegie. The original lot was purchased with the help of James Kidston and held until the Carnegie funds arrived. In a letter from Andrew Carnegie dated March 27, 1903, he wrote "If the city agrees...to maintain a free public library at a cost of not less than $1,250 a year and provides a site for the building, Mr. Carnegie will be pleased to furnish $12,500 to erect a free public library building for La Grange." It was a two-story structure with 5,000 square feet of space.

Carrie Palmer Perkins was the Library's first librarian/director. Perkins retired in 1906 and was succeeded by Louise E. Dewitt, who wrote a weekly library feature article "Our Village Library" in The La Grange Citizen until her retirement in 1932. By 1907, the library's collection had reached 4,800 volumes. The original library building was used for six decades and was a central hub for the Village of La Grange, featuring entertainment and educational events. It also greatly increased its collection size. Due to space limitations and many needed repairs, residents approved a bond in 1967 and received federal grants for a new facility nearly three times the size of the original building. A new building was opened at the corner of Cossitt and La Grange Avenue (10 West Cossitt Avenue) in 1968.

== Late 20th-century ==
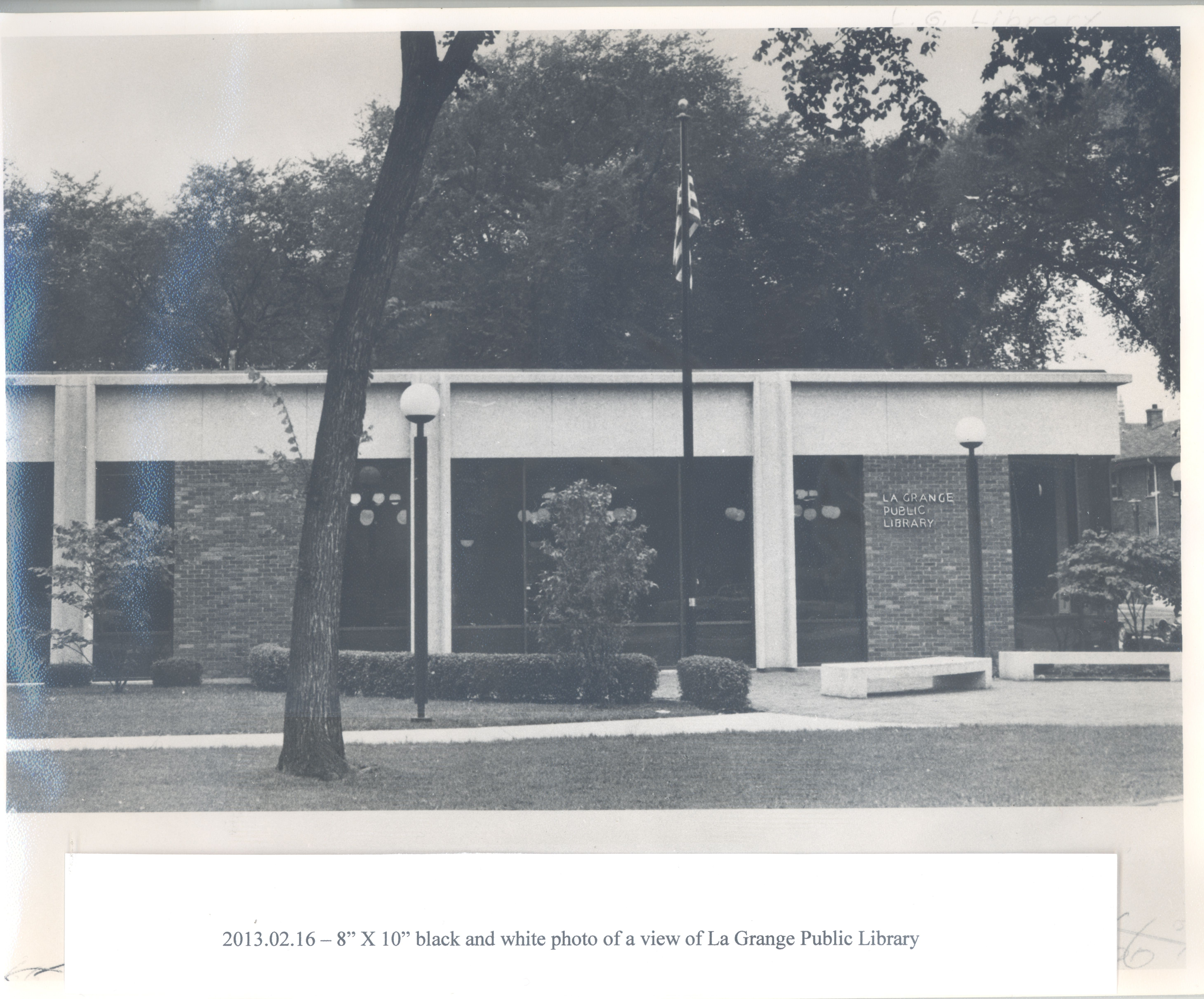
Photo of the library's second building at 10 West Cossitt Avenue

On an average day in 1978, 500-600 people visited the library, and the building contained a meeting room which could accommodate up to 90 people. In its nearly four decades of use, the library doubled its physical collection. On March 19, 1974, a Friends of the Library group was officially incorporated and began receiving book donations and raising funds to help support library initiatives. The group is still currently active. Rumors of hauntings surrounded the new building. On February 11, 1964, the home where the library was later built burned down. While the mother and daughter were rescued unharmed, the father and three children died in the fire. The cause of the fire was never determined. Library Director, Steve Moskal, who took over in 1974, used to work past the library's closing time. He claimed to have encountered the same children's book on the floor on several occasions. He said "I thought it was very unusual because the librarians are very careful about taking care of the books. At first I thought it was the maintenance people coming in, knocking the book off the shelf. But maintenance would come in after midnight and the next morning. This happened after the library closed, but before midnight."

The building was remodeled in the early 1990s to address modernization and space needs, along with complying for the Americans with Disabilities Act. Internet access was added in 1997 thanks to a state grant, as well as donations from the Friends of the Library and La Grange Business Association.

== Current building ==
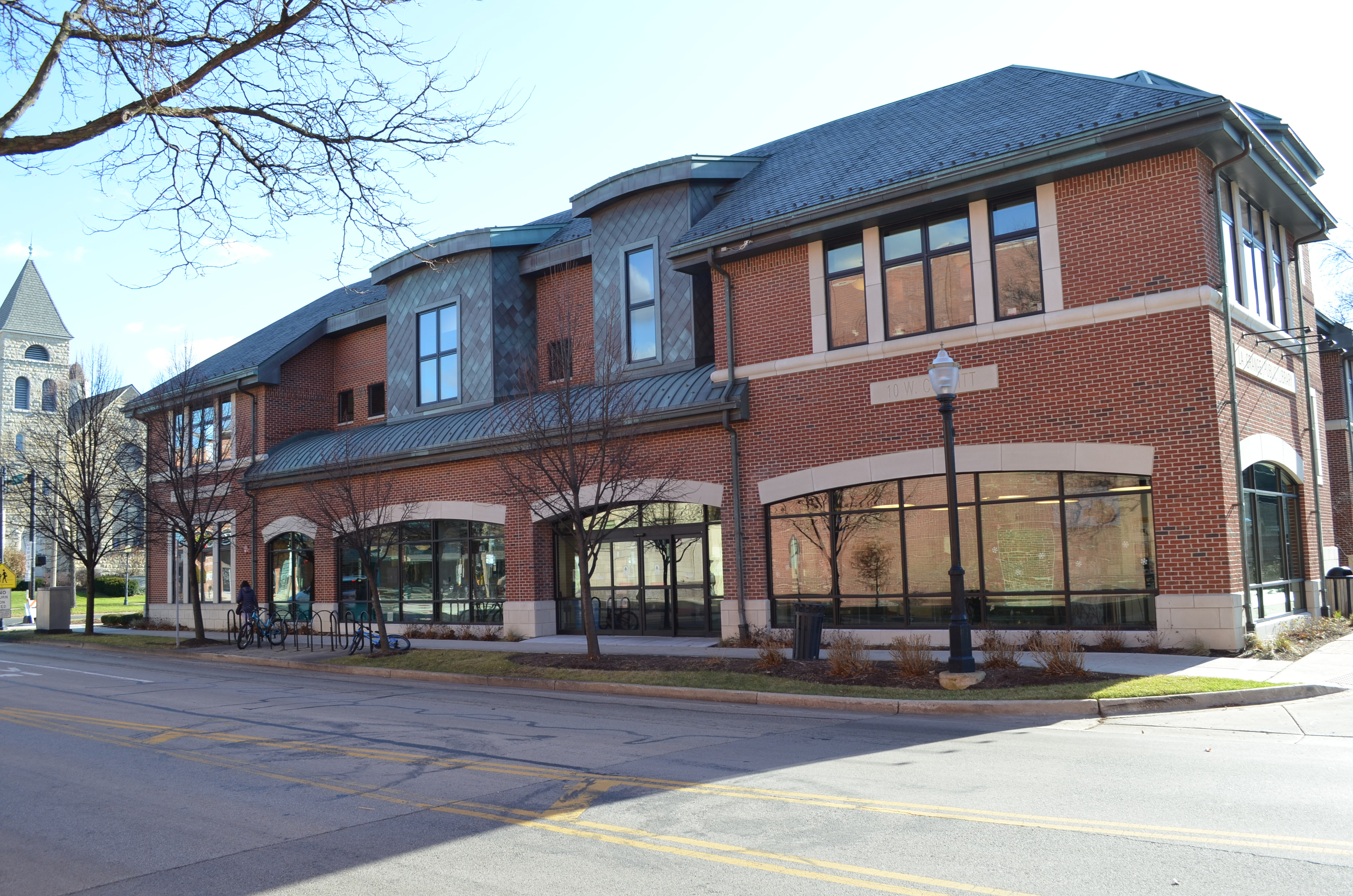
2007-Present

To address the need for more space, further modernization and rooms for public use, groundbreaking for a new building began in September 2006. In November 2007, the current three-story (including the lower level) library building opened and includes study rooms, program rooms and work spaces. It currently has a physical collection of over 100,000 items and a sizable digital collection including eBooks, eAudiobooks, online databases and streaming/downloadable content. The Tyler Duelm Activity Room and Memorial Fund were opened at the same time as the new building in remembrance of Tyler Duelm, a library-lover and La Grange resident who lost his battle to brain cancer at the age of three. Tyler's Room features a specially designed mural that showcases the animals, books and toys Tyler loved. Special "Tyler's Time" programs for kids are funded by donations to the Tyler Duelm Memorial Fund.

The La Grange Public Library has an elected Board of Trustees consisting of seven members. Board members serve four-year terms.
