= Xenia Zarina =

American dancer

- Xenia Zarina, from a 1930 newspaper.
- Born: June Zimmerman; 1903
- Died: August 15, 1967 (aged 63–64); Mexico City
- Occupation(s): Dancer, dance scholar, dance educator
- Notable work: Classic Dances of the Orient (1967)

Xenia Zarina (1903 – August 15, 1967), born June Zimmerman, was an American dancer.

== Early life ==
June Zimmerman was the daughter of Oliver Brunner Zimmerman and Grace Adele Bushnell Zimmerman. Contrary to some accounts of her early life, both of her parents were born in the American Midwest. Her father was a military engineer during World War I, who taught at the University of Wisconsin and the University of California, and wrote a manual for tractor engine maintenance. She graduated from Lyons Township High School in Illinois, and studied dance with Michel Fokine and other Russian dancers.

== Career ==
Zarina danced with the Chicago Opera Civic Ballet as a young woman, and gave dance recitals for community groups in the midwest. She appeared as a dancer in films Morning Judge (1926) and Chucho el Roto (1934). In 1935, she made her New York debut at the Guild Theatre, in a program of regional Mexican and "interpretive" dances with elaborate costumes.

She traveled in Mexico and many Asian countries during the 1930s and 1940s, studying, performing, and teaching traditional dances. She studied with Matsumoto Kōshirō VII in Japan. For a time, when her travels were restricted during World War II, she taught dance to the daughter of the Shah of Iran. While in Iran, she worked with a fellow American expatriate, Nilla Cram Cook, who held a high position in Iran's Ministry of Education.

An illustration depicting Zarina by Magda Nachman was published in Dance Magazine in 1952. She was on the program at Jacob's Pillow Dance Festival in 1955. She wrote a book, Classic Dances of the Orient (1967), with "particularly extensive treatments of the Indian Bhurat Natyam and the Japanese Nihan Buyo."

== Personal life ==
Zarina died in 1967, in her sixties, in Mexico City. Her brother Gordon Zimmerman wrote about her life for an Illinois newspaper after her death.
