= Nilla Cram Cook =

American writer

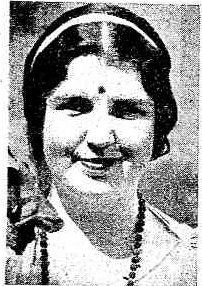
- Nilla Cram Cook while she was living in India, from a 1933 Australian newspaper.
- Born: December 21, 1908; Davenport, Iowa, U.S.
- Died: October 11, 1982 (aged 73); Neunkirchen, Austria
- Other names: Nila Nagini Devi (Hindu name)
- Occupations: Writer, translator, linguist, arts patron
- Parent: George Cram Cook

Nilla Cram Cook (December 21, 1908 – October 11, 1982), also known as Nila Nagini Devi, was an American writer, linguist, translator, and arts patron.

== Early life ==
Nilla Cram Cook was born in Davenport, Iowa, the daughter of playwright George Cram Cook and his second wife, journalist Mollie Anastasia Price. Her father and stepmother Susan Glaspell brought her to Greece as a girl, to study languages and culture there.

== Career ==
In 1931, Cook left her husband in Greece and brought her young son to Kashmir, where she became a follower of Gandhi, converted to Hinduism, and studied Sanskrit, Hindi, and Persian literatures. After she left Gandhi's ashram, with a shaved head and barefoot, she crashed a car, and was detained as a vagrant and hospitalized for a month in 1934, in Calcutta, then deported with her son back to the United States. On arrival at Ellis Island, she made odd pronouncements ("delusions of grandeur", according to her brother), and news stories remarked on the "dramatic" and "hectic" scene. She wrote about this part of her life in a memoir, My Road to India (1939). Mary Sully painted an abstract portrait titled "Nila Cram Cook" in the 1930s.

In 1939, she became Europe correspondent for an American weekly, Liberty. She covered World War II from Greece, until she escaped Nazi detention in July 1941, and fled with her son to Tehran. She worked as a cultural attaché at the American Embassy in Tehran from 1941 to 1947. During that time, Cook converted to Islam, and spent years on a personal project, editing and translating the Koran into English, with her own commentary. She held a high position in Iran's Ministry of Education, oversaw film censorship, and went on radio to read her translations of poetry. She helped build national theatre, ballet, and opera programs in Iran in the 1940s. She worked with a fellow American expatriate, dancer Xenia Zarina, in Iran.

Cook took a renewed interest in Kashmir in 1954, and compiled a book of translated poems, titled The Way of the Swan: Poems of Kashmir (1958).

== Personal life ==
At age 18, in 1927, Nilla Cram Cook married Greek poet and government official Nikos Proestopoulos; they had a son, Serios Nicholas Proestopoulos (also known as Sirius Cook), and divorced in 1932. She married again very briefly, to Albert Nathaniel Hutchins in 1934; that marriage was annulled.

Cook toured in Greece with her son and cousin and their wives in 1965. She died in 1982, aged 74 years, in Neunkirchen, Austria. Her gravesite is in Delphi, Greece, next to her father's grave there.
