= LaGrange Highlands School District 106 =

School district in Illinois, United States

Address
- 1750 West Plainfield Road La Grange Highlands, Illinois, 60525; United States

District information
- Type: Public
- Grades: PreK–8
- NCES District ID: 1719110

Students and staff
- Students: 994

Other information
- Website: www.district106.net

LaGrange Highlands School District 106 is an elementary school district based in La Grange Highlands, an outlying suburb of Chicago located in Cook County, Illinois, near the border with DuPage County. District 106 is composed of two schools: one elementary school and one middle school, each named for the district. The school has 975 students enrolled, and serves 961 of those students currently. The district elementary school, Highlands Elementary School, serves students ranging from prekindergarten to grade four under direction of principal Laura Magruder. District students in grades five through eight move to Highlands Middle School, which is headed by principal Megan VerVynck and assistant principal Stetson Steele. John Munch serves as the superintendent of the district. Highlands feeds into Lyons Township Highschool.

== Activities and Extracurriculars ==
=== Clubs and Activities ===
Highlands Elementary School is home to multiple clubs, mostly in 3rd and 4th grade, including STEM, Art, and Computer clubs. Highlands Middle School is home to a many multitude of clubs, ranging from a What's The Buzz, a club that produces the school newspaper; to clubs specializing in art, science, and chess, as well as an intramural sports club for students in 5th and 6th that allows them to play sports with each other before moving up to official school teams. There is also a school garden, run by the garden club, and a recycling club that handles the recycling. Students may also join band, orchestra, or choir starting in 4th grade until their 8th grade year, with no requirements, though they may choose to try out for jazz band, chamber orchestra, or show choir respectively.

=== Sports ===
Highlands Middle School is home to all major sports in the area, and they compete with surrounding middle schools such as Park, McClure, Gurrie, etc. Starting in 5th grade, students can participate in Cross Country, with no try out necessary. Highlands has a very large cross country team with approximately 100 members participating in the 2022 season, most likely because lots of 5th and 6th graders who are unable to try out for other sports run across Country. Running Cross Country was also highly encouraged, especially under former Middle School Principal, Michael Papierski. Highlands has separate teams for both 7th and 8th grade, and for both grades has a boys and girls basketball team, volleyball team, and softball team, which are cut sports. They also have one co-ed soccer team, which for now is no-cut.

== Demographics ==
Highlands has 975 students enrolled with 961 of those students being officially served in homerooms. Pre-K is an option if the child is eligible, and it has about 50 kids enrolled. The rest of the grades have around 100 students per grade, with the most being the class of 2025 with 116 students enrolled. A total of 498 boys and 463 girls are served in the district. In recent years Highlands has experienced a large population increase due to new homes in the area, with a roughly 20% increase in enrollment from the ‘15-16 school year to the ‘23-24 school year. The largest racial group out of students in the district is white with 78.7%, followed by Hispanic with 11.8%, multi-racial with 4.3%, Asian with 4.2%, and African-American with 1%. About 12% of students have IEPs, 4% are English learners, and 3% are qualified for free or reduced lunches.
