= LaGrange School District 105 =

School district in Illinois, United States

Address
- 701 7th Avenue La Grange, Illinois, 60525; United States

District information
- Type: Public
- Grades: PreK–8
- Schools: 5
- NCES District ID: 1721630

Students and staff
- Students: 1,277

Other information
- Website: d105.net

LaGrange School District 105 (D105) is a school district headquartered in LaGrange, Illinois, with its service area including southern LaGrange as well as all or part of Countryside and Hodgkins.

The first school in the area was in operation near Lyonsville in 1844. In 1945 the district had 279 students. In 1950 it had 728 students.

== Schools ==
Middle school: Gurrie Middle School
Elementary schools:
- Hodgkins Elementary School
- Ideal Elementary School
- Seventh Avenue Elementary School
- Spring Avenue Elementary School
