= Countryside, Illinois =

- City
- logo

- Location of Countryside in Cook County, Illinois.

- Location within Greater Chicago Location within Illinois Location within the United States
- Coordinates: 41°46′44″N 87°52′26″W
- Country: United States
- State: Illinois
- County: Cook
- Township: Lyons
- Incorporated: 1960

Government
  - Type: Mayor–council government
  - Body: The Countryside City Council
  - Mayor: Sean McDermott
  - Treasurer: Courtney Bolt

Area
  - Total: 2.88 sq mi (7.45 km^{2})
  - Land: 2.88 sq mi (7.45 km^{2})
  - Water: 0 sq mi (0.00 km^{2}) 0%

Population (2020)
  - Total: 6,420
  - Density: 2,230.8/sq mi (861.32/km^{2})
- Down 1.6% from 2000

Standard of living (2007-11)
  - Per capita income: $28,124
  - Median home value: $226,700
- ZIP code(s): 60525
- Area code(s): 708
- Geocode: 17-16873
- FIPS code: 17-16873
- Website: www.countryside-il.org

Countryside is a city in Cook County, Illinois, United States. Per the 2020 census, the population was 6,420.

== History ==
The land where Countryside sits was originally inhabited by the Potawatomi Indians and later by early American pioneers in the beginning of the 19th century. Settler Joseph Vial and his family were among the first non-native people to settle in the Countryside area in 1833.

The area remained large expanses of rural farmland until the Great Chicago Fire of 1871, when the fire sent thousands of city dwellers into what is now west suburban Chicago. Land sold for only $2 an acre, which made areas such as Countryside a welcome respite from the congestion and industry in Chicago.

Despite the settlement of these early Countryside inhabitants, the area largely remained a quiet farming community until the post-World War II era when suburban areas such as Countryside began to experience explosive growth. The area's first residential subdivision was LaGrange Terrace, built in 1947; it was later followed by the Don L. Dise and Edgewood Park subdivisions in the 1950s.

The City of Countryside was officially incorporated in 1960.

Around 1917, the Marx Brothers family (later a famous comedy team) bought a chicken farm near Joliet Road (Route 66) and La Grange Road. Groucho Marx later claimed that the brothers spent too much time at Wrigley Field watching the Chicago Cubs to make the farm economically viable.

== Geography ==
According to the 2021 census gazetteer files, Countryside has a total area of 2.88 square miles (7.46 km^{2}), all land.

Neighboring communities are Hodgkins, McCook, and La Grange.

== Demographics ==
Historical population
Census	Pop.	Note	%±
1970	2,864		—
1980	6,242		117.9%
1990	5,716		−8.4%
2000	5,991		4.8%
2010	5,895		−1.6%
2020	6,420		8.9%
U.S. Decennial Census; 2010 2020

=== Racial and ethnic composition ===
Countryside city, Illinois – Racial and ethnic composition Note: the US Census treats Hispanic/Latino as an ethnic category. This table excludes Latinos from the racial categories and assigns them to a separate category. Hispanics/Latinos may be of any race.
Race / Ethnicity (NH = Non-Hispanic)	Pop 2000	Pop 2010	Pop 2020	% 2000	% 2010	% 2020
White alone (NH)	5,285	4,608	4,410	88.22%	78.17%	68.69%
Black or African American alone (NH)	124	179	166	2.07%	3.04%	2.59%
Native American or Alaska Native alone (NH)	3	3	4	0.05%	0.05%	0.06%
Asian alone (NH)	90	86	145	1.50%	1.46%	2.26%
Pacific Islander alone (NH)	0	1	1	0.00%	0.02%	0.02%
Other race alone (NH)	5	7	20	0.08%	0.12%	0.31%
Mixed race or Multiracial (NH)	74	45	133	1.24%	0.76%	2.07%
Hispanic or Latino (any race)	410	966	1,541	6.84%	16.39%	24.00%
Total	5,991	5,895	6,420	100.00%	100.00%	100.00%

=== 2020 census ===
As of the 2020 census, Countryside had a population of 6,420. The median age was 45.3 years. 19.0% of residents were under the age of 18 and 21.0% were 65 years of age or older. For every 100 females, there were 97.2 males, and for every 100 females age 18 and over, there were 94.1 males.

100.0% of residents lived in urban areas, while 0.0% lived in rural areas.

The population density was 2,230.72 inhabitants per square mile (861.29/km^{2}). There were 2,812 housing units at an average density of 977.07 per square mile (377.25/km^{2}). Of the 2,812 housing units, 3.4% were vacant. The homeowner vacancy rate was 1.0% and the rental vacancy rate was 4.3%.

There were 2,717 households in the city, of which 26.5% had children under the age of 18 living in them. Of all households, 43.6% were married-couple households, 20.6% were households with a male householder and no spouse or partner present, and 30.9% were households with a female householder and no spouse or partner present. About 32.1% of all households were made up of individuals, and 16.8% had someone living alone who was 65 years of age or older.

=== Income and poverty ===
The median income for a household in the city was $67,201, and the median income for a family was $90,804. Males had a median income of $52,837 versus $38,649 for females. The per capita income for the city was $44,265. About 5.7% of families and 6.8% of the population were below the poverty line, including 13.2% of those under age 18 and 4.3% of those age 65 or over.

== Economy ==
The International Union of Operating Engineers (IUOE) Local 150 is based in Countryside at 6200 Joliet Road.

Countryside Plaza is a large draw for regional shopping.

== Government ==
Countryside is in Illinois's 6th congressional district.

== Education ==
Countryside is served by La Grange School District 105 and Pleasantdale School District 107. Elementary students attend Ideal Elementary School in Countryside or Pleasantdale Elementary School in Willow Springs. Middle school students attend William F.Gurrie Middle School in La Grange or Pleasantdale Middle School in Burr Ridge IL. High school students move onto Lyons Township High School District 204 which has campuses in La Grange, and Western Springs.

== Infrastructure ==
=== Fire department ===
Countryside is served by the Pleasantview Fire Protection District, founded in 1946. It is directed by a board of trustees which is elected by the areas which make up the district. The fire district currently maintains three stations in its coverage area.

=== Police station ===
The Countryside police department was founded in 1961, Their mission statement stated on the countryside website is "to serve and protect the Countryside community,while building strong relationships based on mutual trust and respect."

=== Transportation ===
Pace provides bus service on routes 330 and 392 connecting Countryside to Summit, O'Hare International Airport and other destinations.
