= Leopard Creek =

Stream in San Miguel County, Colorado, United States

Coordinates: 38°01′12″N 108°03′42″W

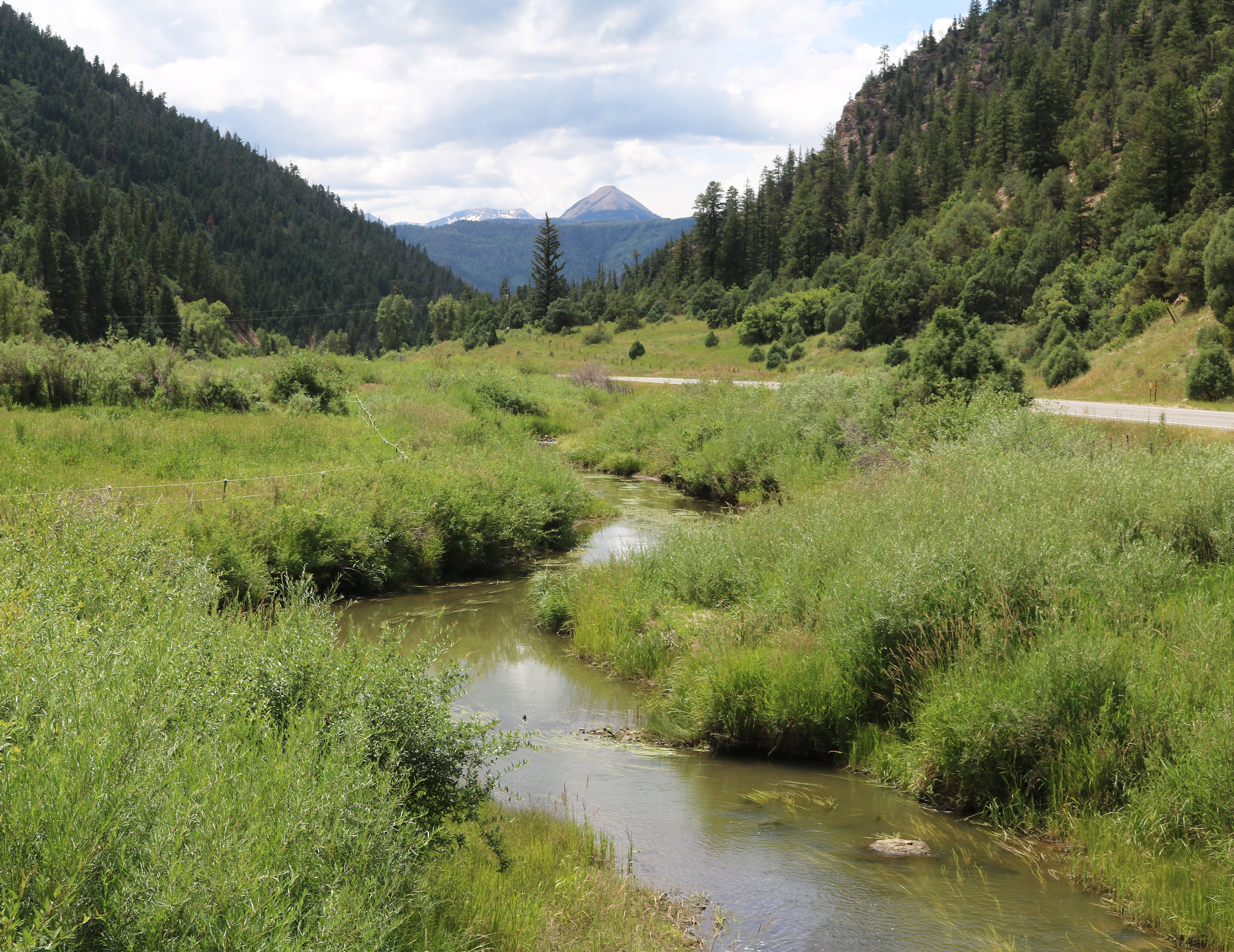
The creek and Colorado State Highway 62

Leopard Creek is a stream located entirely within San Miguel County, Colorado.

According to tradition, the sighting of a leopard near the creek accounts for the name.

== See also ==
- List of rivers of Colorado
