= David McAfee =

American politician

David B. McAfee (June 24, 1947 – February 19, 2005) was an American politician who served in the Illinois House of Representatives from 1991 to 1995.

== Biography ==
David B. Mcafee was born June 24, 1947, in Oak Park, Illinois. He earned his Bachelor of Arts and his Master of Arts in Public Administration and Urban Affairs at American University. He earned his Juris Doctor degree at Southern Methodist University School of Law. An attorney, he was a partner at the law firm of Clausen Miller German Caffrey & Withous, managing partner of Predrickson & Co., home builders and general contractors, and headed the Frederickson Real Estate Improvement Co. He also served as a special assistant Illinois attorney general under Neil F. Hartigan. McAfee defeated Republican incumbent Anne Zickus in the 1990 general election.

In the 1991 decennial redistricting, the Republicans gerrymandered McAfee out of his district. He was subsequently reelected in the new 47th district against Republican attorney James Donoval. In the 1994 general election, Eileen Lyons defeated McAfee.

In the 1996 Democratic primary, McAfee was a candidate for the Metropolitan Water Reclamation District of Greater Chicago Board of Commissioners. He lost the primary, finishing sixth of thirteen candidates with 74,893 votes. In 1998, McAfee was the Democratic candidate for the Cook County Board of Review against Republican legislator Maureen Murphy. McAfee lost to Murphy.

McAfee died on February 19, 2005.
