= Sawpit, Colorado =

Town in San Miguel County, Colorado, United States

- Town
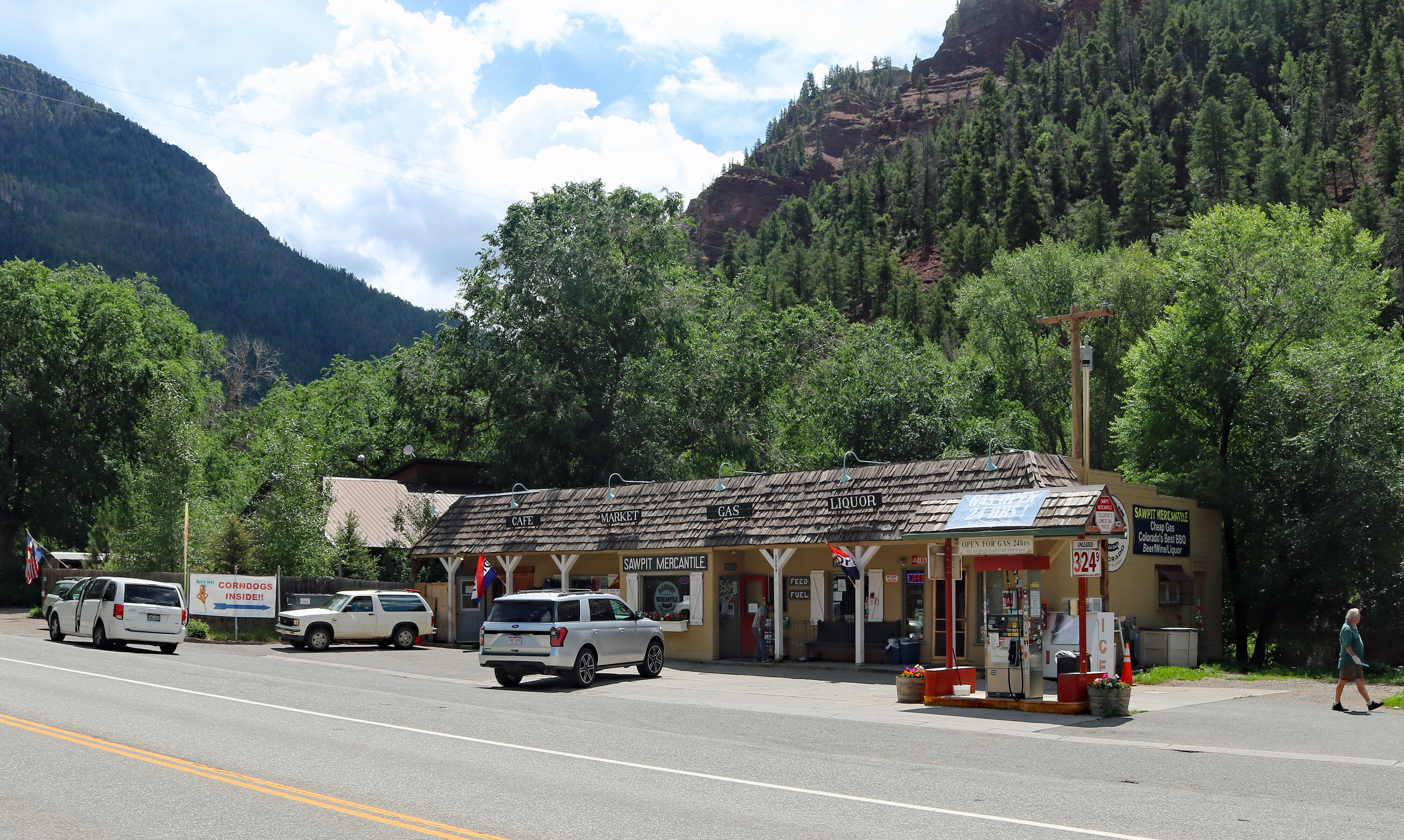
- Sawpit Mercantile in Sawpit

- Location of Sawpit in San Miguel County, Colorado.
- Coordinates: 37°59′41″N 108°00′04″W
- Country: United States
- State: Colorado
- County: San Miguel
- Incorporated: 1896

Government
  - Type: Statutory town

Area
  - Total: 0.031 sq mi (0.08 km^{2})
  - Land: 0.031 sq mi (0.08 km^{2})
  - Water: 0 sq mi (0.00 km^{2})
- Elevation: 7,563 ft (2,305 m)

Population (2020)
  - Total: 38
  - Density: 1,200/sq mi (470/km^{2})
- Time zone: UTC-7 (MST)
  - Summer (DST): UTC-6 (MDT)
- ZIP codes: 81430, 81435
- Area code: 970
- FIPS code: 08-68655
- GNIS feature ID: 2413263

Sawpit is a statutory town in San Miguel County, Colorado, United States. The town population was 38 at the 2020 census, making Sawpit the fifth least populous incorporated town in the state of Colorado. The Telluride Post Office (ZIP Code 81435) serves Sawpit.

== Geography ==
According to the United States Census Bureau, the town has a total area of 0.031 square miles (0.080 km^{2}), all land.

== Demographics ==
Historical population
Census	Pop.	Note	%±
1900	94		—
1910	121		28.7%
1960	30		—
1970	26		−13.3%
1980	41		57.7%
1990	36		−12.2%
2000	25		−30.6%
2010	40		60.0%
2020	38		−5.0%

== Education ==
It is in the Telluride School District.

== See also ==
- List of municipalities in Colorado
