= Country Home (magazine) =

American lifestyle magazine

- Frequency: Quarterly
- Founded: 1984
- Final issue: Currently published
- Company: People Inc.
- Country: United States
- Based in: Des Moines, Iowa
- Language: English
- ISSN: 0737-3740

Country Home is a country lifestyle magazine, published by People Inc. The magazine features decorating and collecting, food and entertaining, fashion and well-being, travel and shopping. Country Home provides ideas and inspiration for readers who live a country lifestyle, or aspire to create one, in city lofts, farmhouses, suburban colonials, getaway cottages. Country Home, which was launched in 1984, was published 10 times a year and each issue has over 8.3 million readers. LuAnn Brandsen and Carol Sheehan served as the editors-in-chief of the magazine.

== See also ==
- Farm & Fireside, which was published under the title The Country Home in the 1930s.
