= La Grange, Illinois =

- Village
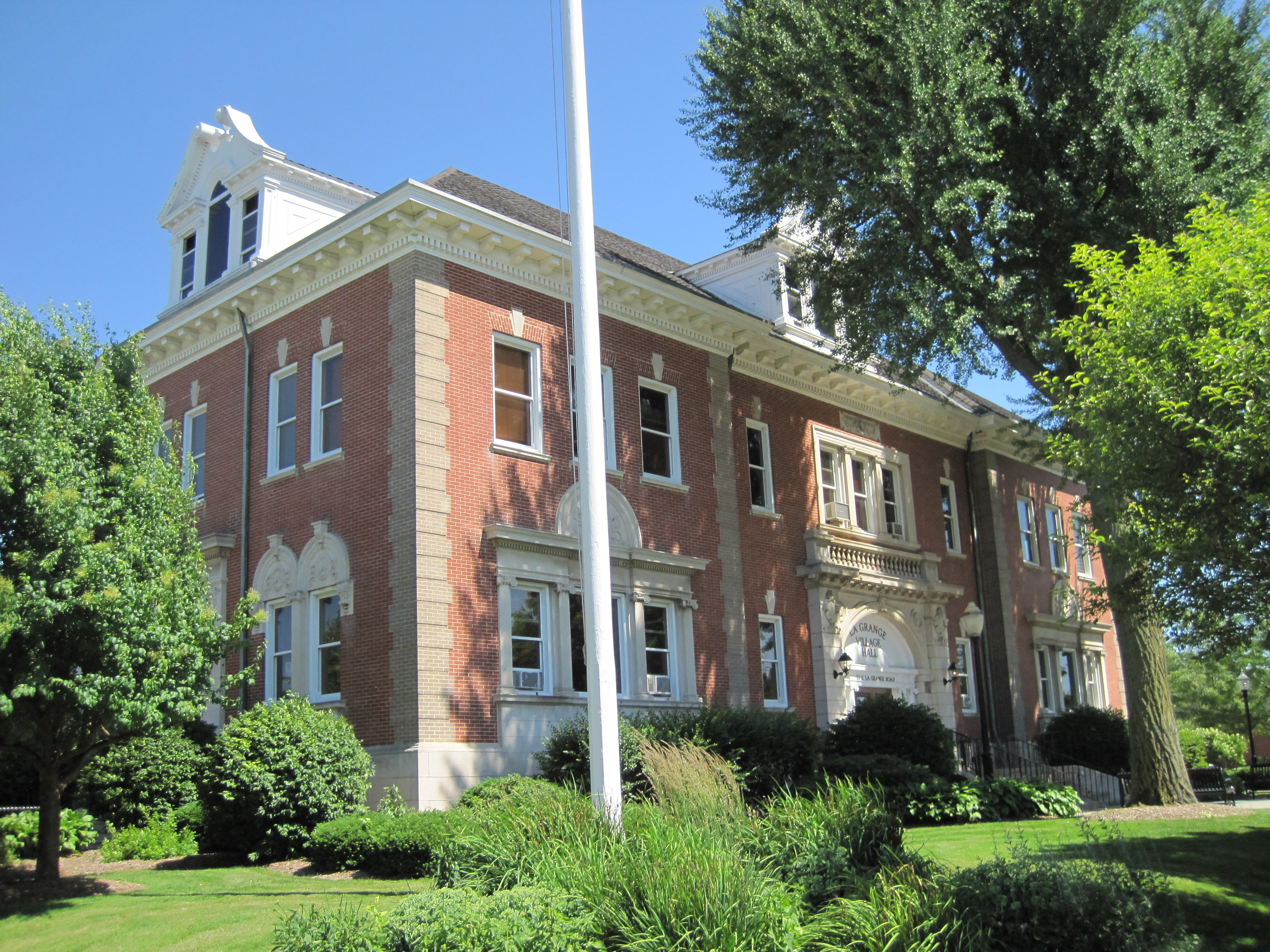
- La Grange Village Hall

- Seal
- Etymology: French: la grange (the barn)
- Motto(s): Tradition & Pride – Moving Forward
- Anthem: My La Grange by Jimmy Dunne
- Location of La Grange in Cook County, Illinois

- Location within Greater Chicago Location within Illinois Location within the United States
- Coordinates: 41°48′29″N 87°52′24″W
- Country: United States
- State: Illinois
- County: Cook
- Township: Lyons Township
- Settled: 1830
- Incorporated: June 11, 1879
- Founder: Franklin Dwight Cossitt
- Named for: La Grange, Tennessee, in turn named after the ancestral home of Marquis de Lafayette

Government
  - Village President: Mark Kuchler
  - Trustees: Beth Augustine; Lou Gale; Michael Kotynek; Shawana McGee; Peggy Peterson

Area
  - Total: 2.53 sq mi (6.54 km^{2})
  - Land: 2.53 sq mi (6.54 km^{2})
  - Water: 0 sq mi (0.00 km^{2}) 0%
- Elevation: 646 ft (197 m)

Population (2020)
  - Total: 16,321
  - Density: 6,464.2/sq mi (2,495.85/km^{2})
- Demonym: La Granger
- Time zone: UTC-6 (CST)
  - Summer (DST): UTC-5 (CDT)
- ZIP code(s): 60525
- Area code: 708
- FIPS code: 17-40767
- Wikimedia Commons: La Grange, Illinois
- Website: www.villageoflagrange.com

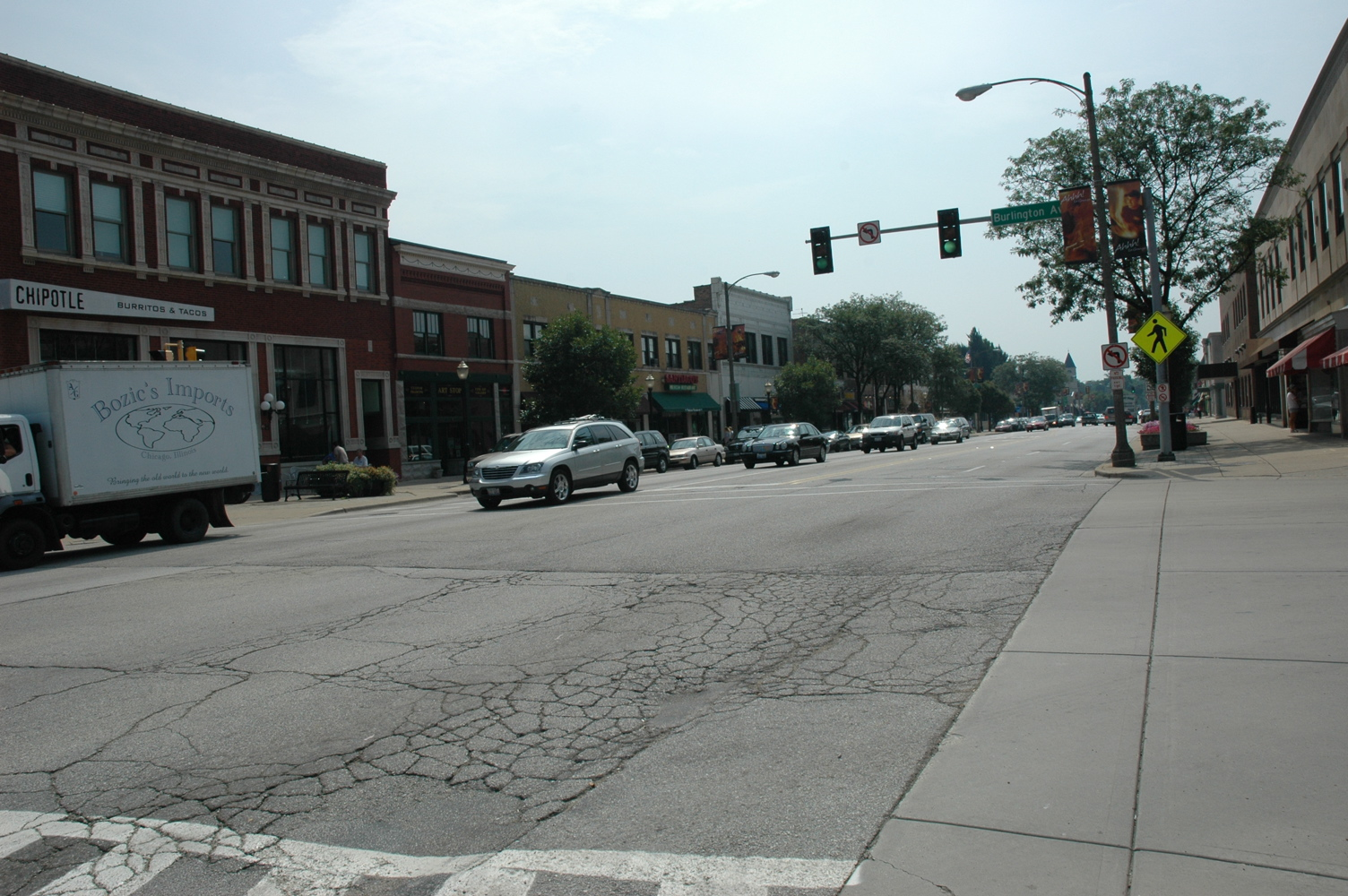
The downtown district of La Grange

La Grange (/lə ˈɡreɪndʒ/ lə GRAYNJ; often spelled LaGrange) is a village in Cook County, Illinois, United States. It is a suburb of Chicago, approximately 13 miles (21 km) from the Chicago Loop. The population was 16,321 at the 2020 census.

== History ==
The area around La Grange was first settled in the 1830s, when Chicago residents moved out to the west due to the rapid population increase in the city in the decade since its incorporation. The first settler, Robert Leitch, came to the area in 1830, seven years before the City of Chicago was incorporated.

The village was officially incorporated on June 11, 1879. It was founded by Franklin Dwight Cossitt, who was born in Granby, Connecticut, and raised in Tennessee, and moved to Chicago in 1862 where he built a wholesale grocery business.

In 1870, Cossitt purchased several hundred acres of farmland in Lyons Township, along the Chicago-Dixon Road, known today as Ogden Avenue (U.S. Highway 34). Ogden Avenue, on the site of a defunct Native American trail, was also referred to as the "Old Plank Road". Planks were often stolen by settlers to be used as building material, which made traveling very bumpy. When the Chicago, Burlington & Quincy Railroad came to town, La Grange was a milk stop called Hazel Glen. A few miles to the south, through present-day Willow Springs, the Illinois and Michigan Canal had emerged as a major shipping corridor, connecting Chicago and the Great Lakes with the Illinois and Mississippi rivers.

Cossitt set out to build the ideal suburban village – laying out streets, planting trees, donating property for churches and schools, and building homes for sale between 2,000–8,000 US$. He also placed liquor restrictions in the land deeds he sold to prevent the village from becoming a saloon town.

When Cossitt began his development, the area was served by a post office known as Kensington. Upon learning of another community already with that name in Illinois, Cossitt instead decided to name his town in honor of La Grange, Tennessee, where he had been raised as a youth on an uncle's slave plantation. To this day, Kensington remains the name of one of the village's major avenues.

After the Great Chicago Fire of 1871 destroyed much of Chicago, thousands of its citizens sought new homes and opportunities away from the city but within a commutable distance. La Grange was one of multiple villages and towns in the surrounding area to receive an influx of these new residents.

Telephones were first set up in La Grange by Dr. George Fox in the 1880s for communication between his home office and a drug store, enabling him to order prescriptions to be delivered by buggy. Growing to 52 lines in 1894, it increased twofold to 120 by the next year, and surged to 2,346 by 1921 (36 percent of the population at the time).

There was a large spike in population is the 1880s and 1890s as the village grew from just over 500 to nearly 4,000 residents, over 600% growth in twenty years. The population continued to grow steadily through the 1960s, peaking at 17,814 according to the 1970 census. The population declined slightly in the 1970s and 1980s, and has been relatively stable since then.

== Geography ==
La Grange is located at 41°48′29″N 87°52′24″W (41.807938, −87.873455), about 13 miles (21 km) west of Chicago. The village is roughly flat, only deviating from the elevation of 645 feet by at most ten feet. La Grange is surrounded by incorporated places of similar sizes on all sides except to the South West, where the La Grange Highlands are.

As of 2020, La Grange has a total area of 2.52 square miles (6.53 km^{2}), all land. Two major railroad tracks run through the village, including the Burlington Northern Santa Fe, and the CSX/Indiana Harbor Belt lines.

Some 14,000 years ago, the land under La Grange sat on the western shore of Lake Chicago, a predecessor to Lake Michigan. The prehistoric shoreline today is delineated by Bluff Avenue, a north–south street on the village's east side.

== Demographics ==
Historical population
| Census | Pop. | Note | %± |
|---|---|---|---|
| 1880 | 531 | | — |
| 1890 | 2,314 | | 335.8% |
| 1900 | 3,969 | | 71.5% |
| 1910 | 5,282 | | 33.1% |
| 1920 | 6,525 | | 23.5% |
| 1930 | 10,103 | | 54.8% |
| 1940 | 10,479 | | 3.7% |
| 1950 | 12,002 | | 14.5% |
| 1960 | 15,285 | | 27.4% |
| 1970 | 17,814 | | 16.5% |
| 1980 | 15,693 | | −11.9% |
| 1990 | 15,362 | | −2.1% |
| 2000 | 15,608 | | 1.6% |
| 2010 | 15,550 | | −0.4% |
| 2020 | 16,321 | | 5.0% |
U.S. Decennial Census

=== Racial and ethnic composition ===
La Grange village, Illinois – Racial and ethnic composition Note: the US Census treats Hispanic/Latino as an ethnic category. This table excludes Latinos from the racial categories and assigns them to a separate category. Hispanics/Latinos may be of any race.
| Race / Ethnicity (NH = Non-Hispanic) | Pop 2000 | Pop 2010 | Pop 2020 | % 2000 | % 2010 | % 2020 |
|---|---|---|---|---|---|---|
| White alone (NH) | 13,816 | 13,361 | 13,420 | 88.52% | 85.92% | 82.23% |
| Black or African American alone (NH) | 935 | 751 | 585 | 5.99% | 4.83% | 3.58% |
| Native American or Alaska Native alone (NH) | 13 | 10 | 7 | 0.08% | 0.06% | 0.04% |
| Asian alone (NH) | 156 | 213 | 274 | 1.00% | 1.37% | 1.68% |
| Pacific Islander alone (NH) | 1 | 0 | 0 | 0.01% | 0.00% | 0.00% |
| Some Other Race alone (NH) | 12 | 20 | 32 | 0.08% | 0.13% | 0.20% |
| Mixed race or Multiracial (NH) | 103 | 197 | 582 | 0.66% | 1.27% | 3.57% |
| Hispanic or Latino (any race) | 572 | 998 | 1,421 | 3.66% | 6.42% | 8.71% |
| Total | 15,608 | 15,550 | 16,321 | 100.00% | 100.00% | 100.00% |

=== 2020 census ===
As of the 2020 census, La Grange had a population of 16,321. The median age was 40.5 years. 26.9% of residents were under the age of 18 and 15.1% of residents were 65 years of age or older. For every 100 females there were 94.4 males, and for every 100 females age 18 and over there were 91.3 males age 18 and over.

100.0% of residents lived in urban areas, while 0.0% lived in rural areas.

There were 5,955 households in La Grange, of which 38.1% had children under the age of 18 living in them. Of all households, 59.5% were married-couple households, 13.1% were households with a male householder and no spouse or partner present, and 24.3% were households with a female householder and no spouse or partner present. About 24.5% of all households were made up of individuals and 11.7% had someone living alone who was 65 years of age or older.

There were 6,415 housing units, of which 7.2% were vacant. The homeowner vacancy rate was 1.9% and the rental vacancy rate was 8.6%.

=== Income and poverty ===
The median income for a household in the village was $122,629, and the median income for a family was $151,026. Males had a median income of $104,060 versus $43,089 for females. The per capita income for the village was $60,162. About 1.2% of families and 3.6% of the population were below the poverty line, including 1.3% of those under age 18 and 3.9% of those age 65 or over.

== Economy ==
=== Business and commerce ===
La Grange is the mailing address for the headquarters of Electro-Motive Diesel, formerly General Motors' Electro-Motive Division, a major manufacturer of railroad locomotives and diesel engines. The headquarters, engineering facilities and parts-manufacturing operations are located in the adjacent village of McCook. Originally, the locomotives were also built there, but in more recent years final assembly has moved to EMD's other facility in Muncie, Indiana.

The downtown area, centered along and around La Grange Road (US 45) and the BNSF Railway line, became somewhat run-down during the 1980s, but saw a revival in the mid-to-late 1990s, with many new businesses opening, including many restaurants.

That expansion of the downtown led to increased congestion, and parking often became difficult to find, especially on weekends. A parking structure was paid for by a grant from the state for the advancement of public transportation, since increasing parking for train commuters would increase the number of people willing to use the train. The upkeep is paid for by an increase in the sales tax at restaurants and other entertainment establishments. There was no increase in the local property taxes.

== Arts and culture ==
La Grange holds numerous public activities and festivals. Art fairs, historic housewalks, carnivals, and farmer's markets are also common, mostly taking place in the downtown area.

=== Pet Parade ===
An annual event known as the Pet Parade has been conducted every year since 1947 and attracts thousands of people from the La Grange area. The parade marches through downtown and includes a wild variety of animal pets like dogs, cats, hamsters, birds, and farm animals. There is a long history of Grand Marshals for the parade including Elephants and Donkeys from the Brookfield Zoo (1948), Luci Baines Johnson – Daughter of the President Lyndon B. Johnson (1964), and Susan Dey and Danny Bonaduce of "The Partridge Family" (1971).

=== Architecture ===
The La Grange Village Historic District makes up a large section of the village and includes over 1,000 buildings representing several popular architectural styles of late 19th century and early 20th century. A few homes in district were designed by Frank Lloyd Wright. There is even a "bootleg" house, one he designed on the side, contrary to his employment agreement, when he was supposed to be working exclusively for architect Louis Sullivan. Wright was reportedly fired over this and similar employment agreement infractions.

== Parks and recreation ==
The Park District of La Grange maintains 78.5 acres of parkland at 11 locations, and offers over 1,500 recreation programs annually for its more than 16,000 residents. Parks within the village limits include:

- Community Center & Park (1 acre)
- Denning Park (10 acres)
- Elm Park (2 acres)
- Gilbert Park (6 acres)
- Gordon Park (17 acres)
- Meadowbrook Manor Park
- Rotary Centennial Park (0.3 acres)
- Sedgwick Park (25 acres)
- Spring Park (0.85 acres)
- Spring/Gurrie School Park (8 acres)
- Stone Park (0.5 acres)
- Waiola Park (3.5 acres)

== Government ==
The Village of La Grange is a non-home rule municipal corporation and operates under a board-manager form of government. A seven-member board of trustees, elected as provided by state law, serves four-year overlapping terms. A village manager is appointed by the board.

The village has six operating departments: administration, finance, police, fire, community development and public works.

The village is split between Illinois' 4th and 6th congressional districts, represented by Jesús G. "Chuy" García and Sean Casten respectively.

The village is served by the Park District of La Grange with a five-member board of commissioners, elected as provided by state law, which serves four-year overlapping terms. An executive director is appointed by the board.

=== Endorsing organizations ===
The Citizens' Council of La Grange has existed in La Grange for over 75 years. As all such organizations under the village manager form of government, it is non-partisan. The council in particular seeks, evaluates, and recommends candidates for the village, La Grange Public Library and park district boards.

== Education ==
=== Public schools ===
Students in the village are served by one of three K-8 public school districts. The northern half of the village (roughly any students north of 47th Street) is part of La Grange School District 102. District 102 elementary schools within the village include: Cossitt School (named after Franklin Cossitt) and Ogden Avenue School (named after the local name for U.S. Route 34, which in turn is named after William Butler Ogden, first mayor of Chicago). Kindergarten students in District 102 may also attend Barnsdale Road School in La Grange Park, Illinois. Some elementary students attend Forest Road School in neighboring La Grange Park, Illinois, and Congress Park School in neighboring Brookfield, Illinois. Middle school students in District 102 attend Park Junior High, located in La Grange Park.

The southern half of the village (roughly any students south of 47th Street) is part of La Grange School District 105. District 105 elementary schools within the village include Seventh Avenue School and Spring Avenue School, both located on the streets that share their names. Middle school students in District 105 attend Gurrie Middle School.

A small number of students in the southwest portion of La Grange are served by LaGrange Highlands School District 106, attending Highlands Elementary School and Highlands Middle School in nearby La Grange Highlands, Illinois.

Lyons Township High School District 204 serves the entire village grades 9 through 12. North Campus, located in La Grange, is used by Juniors and Seniors and was the original high school. Freshmen and Sophomores go to South Campus, founded in 1956, located in neighboring Western Springs. The Campus was split due to lack of available land for expansion around the original building. Previously there also was a junior college associated with the high school, but due to increasing enrollment, lack of space, and new rules that separated junior colleges from high schools, it was merged with College of DuPage in 1967. When it was open, Lyons Township Junior College was nicknamed Tick-Tock Tech, due to its location near the clock tower.

=== Private schools ===
St. Cletus and St. Francis Xavier serve as the two Roman Catholic K-8 schools in La Grange. St. John's Lutheran is the one Lutheran K-8 school within the village limits.

Preschool programs are available at Kensington School of La Grange, Creative World Montessori School, Little People's Country, Grace Lutheran Church, and First United Methodist Church.

== Media ==
One of the newspapers of La Grange is The Doings, a subsidiary of the Chicago Tribune.

=== Lyons Township ===
Lyons Township High School by far provides the most media outlets. The first one established, LION Newspaper, was founded over a century ago and distributes news to all over the district. The second form of media, WLTL, first aired in 1968 and has been broadcasting music for fifty years. LTHS also hosts Lyons Township Television (LTTV), which transmits sports or programs created by students of Lyons Township.

== Infrastructure ==
=== Transportation ===
==== Roads ====
Two major highways traverse La Grange: The village's main street, La Grange Road (U.S. Routes 12/20/45), runs north–south and intersects Interstate 55 (Stevenson Expressway) south of the village. Ogden Avenue (U.S. Route 34) runs east–west and intersects Interstate 294 (Tri-State Tollway), west of the village.

==== Bus service ====
Commuter bus service is provided by Pace, the suburban bus division of the Regional Transportation Authority.

==== Train service ====
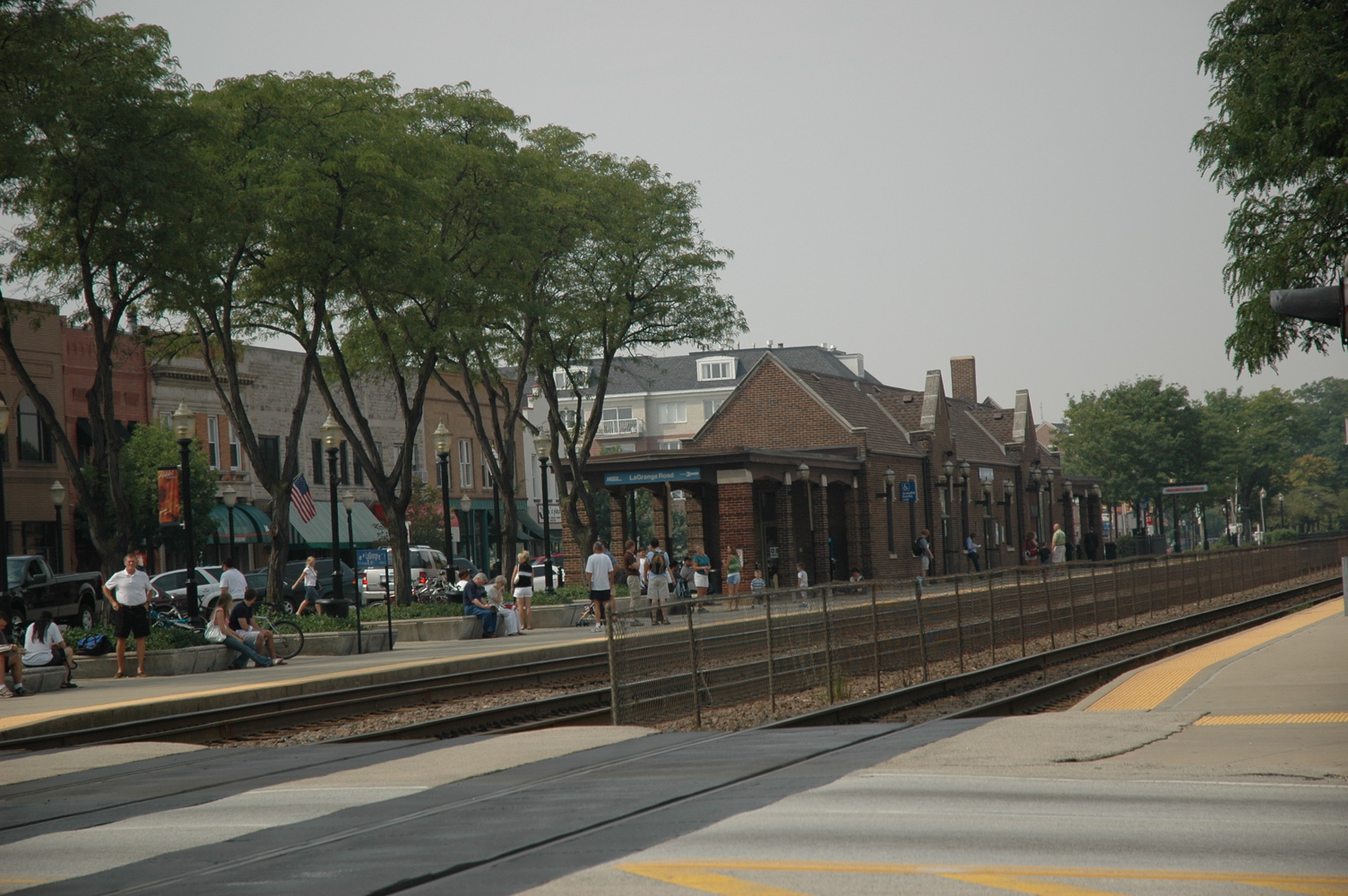
La Grange Road train stop on the BNSF Line

The first rail link to Chicago dates to 1864, established by the Chicago, Burlington and Quincy Railroad. La Grange currently has three tracks belonging to the BNSF Railway that run through the north end of the village, with passenger rail service provided by Metra and Amtrak.

Metra's BNSF Line provides frequent commuter service between Aurora and Chicago, with two stations in La Grange. Express service to Downtown Chicago (Union Station) from La Grange Road takes approx. 23 minutes. Amtrak's Illinois Zephyr and Carl Sandburg (both destined for Quincy, Illinois) run twice daily trains through La Grange stopping at La Grange Road.

Freight rail traffic on the BNSF line is extremely heavy, with BNSF operating freight trains on all three mainline tracks through the village. During non-rush hours, a freight train may run along the line as frequently as once every ten minutes on average. The Indiana Harbor Belt Railroad, running north–south through the east end of the village, also has extremely heavy freight traffic.

==== Airport ====
O'Hare International Airport and Midway International Airport are approx. 18 and 7 mi (29 and 11 km) away from La Grange, respectively.

A proposed passenger rail line connecting the two airports would have a station in La Grange.

La Grange was once home to a municipal air field called Stinson Airport. The airport was closed in the late 1950s and is now a large quarry.

=== Health care ===
UChicago Medicine AdventHealth La Grange is the only hospital in La Grange.

== Notable people ==
- John Briscoe, pitcher for the Oakland Athletics
- Sarah Wayne Callies, actor (Prison Break and The Walking Dead)
- Patrick Chovanec, business professor at Tsinghua University, economics and political commentator
- John Curulewski, guitarist, vocalist, composer, teacher, producer, and original member of Styx
- Nick Fuentes, a far-right political commentator (raised in La Grange)
- Luis Armand Garcia, actor (the George Lopez TV series)
- Kevin Guilfoile, novelist and essayist residing in La Grange
- David Hasselhoff, actor (Baywatch) and German pop superstar
- Fred Herbert, pitcher for the New York Giants
- Jeff Hornacek, basketball player, NBA All-Star and former coach of New York Knicks, Phoenix Suns
- Otto Hunziker, educator and technical innovator in the dairy industry
- Richard H. Jeschke, Marine Corps Brigadier General during World War II
- Jason Karnuth, pitcher for the St. Louis Cardinals and Detroit Tigers
- Ben LaBolt (b. 1981), White House Communications Director since 2023. He was a childhood resident of LaGrange.
- Reed G. Landis (1896–1975), military aviator and flying ace during World War I. He resided in La Grange in 1947.
- John Lewis, jazz pianist, composer and arranger; founder and musical director of the Modern Jazz Quartet
- Helen Lynd, professor and author
- Benjamin Roy Mottelson, Nobel Prize in Physics, 1975
- Marie Newman, congresswoman
- George Paskvan, fullback and defensive back for the Green Bay Packers
- Alfred F. Schimek, architect
- Tim Stapleton, retired NHL forward
- Quint Studer, founder and CEO of the health care consulting company Studer Group, LLC; co-owner of the Pensacola Blue Wahoos
- Ty Warner, toy manufacturer, businessman, actor; founder of Ty Inc., which manufactures and distributes Beanie Babies
- Leona Woods, physicist and youngest member of the Manhattan Project team
- Art Young, radical cartoonist and author
