= Lyons Township High School =

Public school in La Grange, Illinois, United States

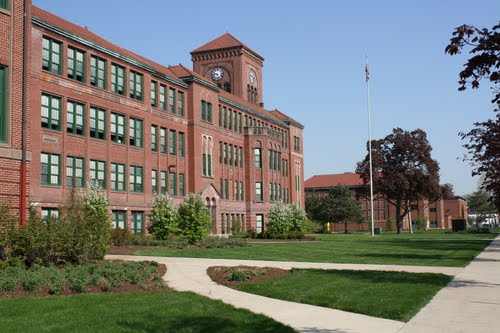
- Lyons Township High School North Campus

Location
- 100 South Brainard Avenue; La Grange, Illinois 60525; United States; 41.812155°N 87.88028°W (North campus); 41.801247°N 87.89101°W (South campus)

Information
- Other name: Lyons Township; LTHS; LT
- School type: Coed Public
- Motto: Vita Plena (The quest for the fulfilling life)
- Opened: 1888
- School district: Lyons Township High School District 204
- Superintendent: Brian Waterman
- Principal: Jennifer Tyrrell
- Staff: 266.80 (on an FTE basis)
- Grades: 9–10 (South); 11–12 (North)
- Enrollment: 3,730 (2024–2025)
- Average class size: 22.1
- Student to teacher ratio: 16:1
- Campus size: 28.6 square miles
- Colours: royal blue gold
- Fight song: Gold & Blue, based on My Illinois
- Athletics conference: West Suburban (Silver) Conference
- Mascot: Noil and Nessie
- Nickname: Lions
- Accreditation: North Central Association
- Newspaper: Lion
- Yearbook: Tabulae
- Nobel laureates: Ben R. Mottelson; 1975-physics
- Website: www.lths.net

Lyons Township High School (often referred to as LTHS or simply LT) is a public high school in Western Springs, Illinois (South Campus), and La Grange, Illinois (North Campus).

Lyons Township is a coeducational high school and serves grades 9–12 for Lyons Township High School District 204. Students from the communities of La Grange, Western Springs, Burr Ridge, La Grange Park, Countryside, Indian Head Park, Hodgkins, and parts of Brookfield, Willow Springs, and McCook attend Lyons Township. Lyons Township High School is the 8th-largest public high school in Illinois and the 45th-largest public high school in the United States.

== History ==
Lyons Township High School was established on April 4, 1888, and opened on September 4, 1888. LTHS's first principal was Professor H.W. Thurston. The original building is now a part of North Campus in La Grange. On September 9, 1889, the school was officially dedicated. In June of 1891, Lyons Township held its first commencement with seven students, all women.

On October 10, 1905, The LT Board of Education purchased just over three acres adjacent to the school. This land was used for athletic purposes and became known as Emmond Field. The original gate into Emmond Field still stands outside of the Vaughan Building at North Campus.

In 1915, the first school band was formed. On Oct 30, 1926, the first homecoming dance was held, and featured a banquet and dance.

The 1926 addition to the school added roughly 35 new classrooms, an auditorium with seating for 1,800, a community room with a small stage, and a gymnasium created for girls' athletics.

In March 1928, the Bell Tower was up and running for the first time. The face of the large bell is adorned with the words:

“As call so fly the irrevocable hours, Utile as air or strong as fate, Make your lives of sand or granite; awful powers; Men as man choose, they either give or take.”

The LT Junior College (LTJC) opened in September of 1930. The college was located on the third floor of North Campus by the Clock Tower. LTJC was the primary predecessor to the College of DuPage (COD). It was officially annexed into COD's District 502 after it closed in June 1967. LTHS is the only high school in Cook County that is included within District 502, due to the history between the two schools.

The Corral opened for the first time on May 30, 1944. It was constructed as a social place for all students to spend time with each other after school hours. Additionally in 1944, nearly 320 members of the graduating class went off to fight in World War II.

Leonard H. Vaughan (president of a seed company and former school board president) funded the erection of the Vaughan Building; it was constructed in 1949 for sporting events and classes.

In 1956, South Campus was opened about a mile south-west in nearby Western Springs to accommodate the community's growing population. While the school was not fully completed at the time, the main academic wings were ready; however, the gym, biology classrooms, etc. were not.

In 1969, for the first time in LT’s history, enrollment surpassed 5,000 students. LT saw its highest enrollment during the 1971-72 school year, with a record-setting 5,220 students.

In 1998, A tradition of retirees and first year teachers ceremoniously ringing the clock tower bells began, and still continues today.

In 2005, a performing arts center, a field house, and a pool were added to the South campus to complement the facilities at the North campus.

From 2019-2021, LTHS began planning for a multi-year project named Groundwork for a Brighter Future, aimed at modernizing both campuses to "better meet the 21st Century learning needs of students and staff." Phase 1 (2024 to 2026) projects included construction of a new cafeteria, a new music wing, and new health classrooms at South Campus, restrooms and accessibility upgrades at both campuses, and installation of additional air conditioning at North Campus. Phase 2 projects are to include completion of A/C to ensure that 100% of both campuses is temperature controlled, completion of classroom modernization project to ensure that 100% of classrooms at both campuses are renovated, and additional physical welfare and athletic program facilities improvements.

In 2024, LTHS received a donation of $3,000,000 from the Stacy Ann Baker Charitable Fund to pay the costs of modernizing the Girls’ Varsity Softball Field at South Campus. Baker was a softball player and member of the LTHS class of 1985 who passed away in a car accident in 1999 at the age of 32. The new field was completed in 2026 and is named "Baker Field." At their first game on the field, LT Girls' Varsity Softball won 10-3 against Leyden High School.

== Academics ==
As of 2026, U.S. News ranked LTHS #39 in Illinois High Schools and #884 in National Rankings.

During the 2024-2025 school year, LTHS offered 36 Dual Credit classes, 181 Elective classes, and 26 Academic Summer School Classes, along with required courses. The Average ACT Mean Score for the Class of 2026 was 22.9.

LTHS achieved Exemplary Rating on the 2024 Illinois School Report Card Results for the 2023-24 school year.

== Demographics ==
In the 2024–2025 school year, there were 3,730 students enrolled at the school. 64% of students identified as non-Hispanic White, 27% were Hispanic or Latino, 4% were multiracial, 3% were Black, and 2% were Asian-American. The school has a student to teacher ratio of 16:1.

== Student Life ==
=== Athletics ===
The school competes within the Illinois High School Association (IHSA), and has won at least 35 state championships to date. Current sports include boys' and girls' golf, cross country, soccer, swimming & diving, tennis, volleyball, basketball, competitive cheer (coed), competitive dance (coed), wrestling, track, lacrosse, and water polo.

In addition, the school has boys' football, bowling, and baseball teams and girls' flag football, gymnastics, badminton, and softball teams.

Furthermore, while not sponsored by the IHSA, the school also sponsors boys' gymnastics (IHSGCA), Special Olympics Basketball (SOILL), and Special Olympics Track (SOILL).

The following IHSA sports have won State championships:

- Baseball: 1966–67, 2002–03, 2010–11
- Boys basketball: 1952–53, 1969–70
- Boys cross country: 1955–56, 1956–57
- Boys golf: 1938–39
- Boys gymnastics (cut by IHSA in 2023): 2020–21
- Girls gymnastics: 2012–13, 2013–14
- Boys soccer: 2009–10
- Boys swimming & diving: 2015–16, 2016–17
- Girls tennis: 1990–91, 1991–92, 1992–93
- Boys track & field: 1913–14, 1914–15, 1947–48, 1948–49, 1951–52, 1952–53, 1953–54, 1960–61, 1972–73
- Girls volleyball: 1975–76, 1989–90, 2010–11
- Girls water polo: 2009–10

=== Clubs and Activities ===
The school offers 17 sports intramurals & 123 clubs, including community service organizations, academic competition teams, foreign language groups, and special interest clubs.

==== Student Council ====
The LTHS Student Council is the student government of Lyons Township High School. It is home to unique events ranging from the All School Assembly, hosting more than 4000+ people in one gym a year, and one of the largest homecomings in the state of Illinois.

Nick Fuentes was Student Council president in 2015–2016.

==== Newspaper ====
The LION newspaper is the student publication of LTHS. The first issue of The LION was published on January 24, 1910.

The LION is a member of the High School National Ad Network.

In 2024, the LION received the "Golden Eagle" award from the Northern Illinois Scholastic Press Association, as well as "Bronze Medal" Distinction and Blue Ribbons for Excellence.

==== Yearbook ====
Tabulae is Lyons Township High School's nationally award winning yearbook. The first edition of the yearbook was the "El Tee Hi Tabulae," named by the class of 1908.

The 2025 Edition received awards from Kettle Moraine Press Association ("All-KEMPA"), National Scholastic Press Association ("First Class with One Mark of Distinction"), and Northern Illinois Scholastic Press Association ("Golden Eagle"). The 2024 Edition received "First Place" & "Best Theme Continuity" from American Scholastic Press Association, "All-KEMPA" from Kettle Moraine, "First Class" from National Scholastic, and "Golden Eagle" from Northern Illinois Scholastic.

==== Menagerie ====
Menagerie student-run publication in which students are given the opportunity to showcase their poetry, prose and artwork.

The 2025 Edition received awards from National Scholastic Press Association ("All-American with Five Marks of Distinction," "Best in Show - 1st Place" (in partnership with JEA)), Journalism Education Association ("Best in Show - 1st Place" (in partnership with NSPA)), and the National Council of Teachers of English ("First Class")

==== Radio Station ====
LTHS is the license holder of WLTL-FM, a Class A non-commercial radio station which broadcasts from the North Campus on 88.1 FM. WLTL 88.1 at 15 watts began in 1927.

Every year, WLTL holds "Rock-a-Thon," a fundraiser that runs for 72 hours straight and funds the station for the whole year. During the event, students will be live on air for all 72 hours and will play music, do activities, and have fun.

At the 2026 Intercollegiate Broadcasting System awards, WLTL was nominated 36 times. They won the following awards:

- Best Live Music Broadcast (2 nominations)
- Best Play-By-Plays: Football
- Best Play-By-Plays: Men's Basketball
- Best Show Promo (2 nominations)
- Best Show Intro
- Best Public Service Announcement
- Best Station ID
- Best Promotions Director
- Best Production Director (Radio)
- Best Faculty Advisor (Radio)
- Best High School Radio Station

==== Television Station ====
In April of 1977, the NC TV studio was completed and opened. LTTV is LT's the student-run awarding winning television station.

LTTV is nominated for 3 categories at the 2026 Emmy Awards - NATAS Chicago/Midwest Chapter Awards:

- Live Sporting Event/Game
- Commercial
- Director

== Notable alumni ==
- George Burditt, lawyer and politician
- Bruce Campbell, baseball player
- Terrel E. Clarke, Illinois state legislator and businessman
- Jimmy Dunne (songwriter), songwriter, TV and film composer
- Jake Elliott, NFL kicker for Philadelphia Eagles
- Nick Fuentes, far-right political commentator
- Kathy Gleason, Professor of Landscape Architecture at Cornell University
- Bill Gothard, fundamentalist Christian minister and founder of the Institute in Basic Life Principles
- David Hasselhoff, actor and singer, best known for television series Knight Rider, Baywatch, and America's Got Talent
- John Hattendorf, professor and historian specializing in maritime and naval history
- Michael Hitchcock, actor, writer, and producer
- Bill Holderman, film director, screenwriter and film producer
- Jim Holvay, songwriter and musician
- Jeff Hornacek, professional basketball player, former head coach of New York Knicks
- Oren Koules, producer of Saw movie series, producer of Two and a Half Men TV series, former owner Tampa Bay Lightning NHL team
- Ben LaBolt, White House Communications Director
- Ben R. Mottelson, nuclear physicist who shared 1975 Nobel Prize in Physics with James Rainwater and Aage Bohr for their model of nuclear structure
- Christine Radogno, Republican leader in Illinois State Senate, representing the 41st Senate District
- Matt Rehwoldt aka "Aiden English", a professional wrestler
- John Saban, football player
- Lou Saban, former professional football player and coach
- Gabrielle Walsh, actress
- Ty Warner, CEO of Ty Inc. and inventor of Beanie Babies
- David Warsh, journalist.
- Dave Wehrmeister, former MLB player (San Diego Padres, New York Yankees, Philadelphia Phillies, Chicago White Sox)
- Leona Woods, physicist who helped build Chicago Pile-1, the first nuclear reactor
- Xenia Zarina, dancer
