= List of theaters in Chicago =

This is a list of notable theatre companies, performance venues, and rental performance spaces in the Chicago area.

== Chicago area theatre venues and organizations ==
=== Resident companies and venues ===
- About Face
- Aguijón Theater
- American Blues Theater
- Annoyance Theatre
- Black Ensemble Theater Company
- Center on Halsted
- Chicago Dramatists
- Chicago Shakespeare Theater
- Chopin Theatre
- Citadel Theatre (Lake Forest)
- City Lit Theater
- Copernicus Center (formerly Gateway Theatre)
- Court Theatre
- Factory Theater
- First Folio Theatre (Oak Brook)
- Goodman Theatre
- iO Theater
- Irish Theatre of Chicago (formerly Seanachaí Theatre Company)
- Kane Repertory Theatre (St. Charles)
- Lifeline Theatre
- Lookingglass Theatre Company
- Lyric Opera of Chicago
- Marriott Theatre (Lincolnshire)
- MCA Stage
- Merle Reskin Theatre (DePaul) (formerly Blackstone Theater)
- Music Theater Works (formerly Light Opera Works) (Evanston)
- Neo-Futurists
- Oak Park Festival Theatre (Oak Park)
- Opera in Focus (Rolling Meadows)
- Paramount Theatre (Aurora)
- The Playground
- Porchlight Music Theatre
- Raven Theater
- A Red Orchid Theatre
- Red Tape Theatre
- Red Theater Chicago
- Remy Bumppo Theatre Company
- The Second City
- Shattered Globe Theatre Company
- Silk Road Rising
- Steep Theatre Company
- Steppenwolf Theatre Company
- Strawdog Theatre Company
- Theatre-Hikes
- Theo Ubique Cabaret Theatre
- TimeLine Theatre Company
- Trap Door Theatre
- Victory Gardens Theater

=== Itinerant companies ===
- Babes With Blades
- Child's Play Touring Theatre
- Collaboraction
- ETA Creative Arts Foundation
- Free Street Theater
- Ghostlight Ensemble Theatre Co
- LiveWire Chicago Theatre
- Off-Off Campus (UChicago)
- Red Theater Chicago
- Theater Oobleck (formerly Streetlight Theater)
- TUTA Theatre

=== Touring and rental venues ===
- Apollo Theater Chicago
- Arie Crown Theatre
- Auditorium Theatre
- Briar Street Theater
- Broadway Playhouse at Water Tower Place (formerly Drury Lane Water Tower Place)
- Bughouse Theater
- Cadillac Palace Theatre
- Chicago Theatre
- CIBC Theatre (formerly The Shubert Theatre)
- Congress Theater
- Greenhouse Theater Center
- Harris Theater (Chicago)
- James M. Nederlander Theatre (formerly Oriental Theatre)
- Lyric Opera of Chicago
- Rosemont Theater
- Theater Wit

=== Community Theatres ===
- Big Noise Theatre
- Brightside Theatre
- Elgin Theatre Company
- H.O.T.T. Productions
- Music on Stage
- St. James Theatre
- Theatre of Western Springs
- Up and Coming Theatre Company
- Wheaton Drama

=== Inactive, historic companies and venues ===
Companies

- Accidental Shakespeare
- American Theater Company
- Body Politic Theater
- Bailiwick Repertory Theatre
- BoHo Theatre
- Boxer Rebellion Theatre Company
- Caffeine Theatre
- Chicago Center for the Performing Arts
- Compass Players
- Defiant Theatre
- Ethiopian Art Theatre
- Famous Door Theatre
- First Folio Theatre (Oak Brook)
- Goat Island
- Happy Happy Good Show
- The Hypocrites
- Illinois Theatre Center
- Improv Institute
- Infamous Commonwealth Theatre
- Mary-Arrchie Theatre Company
- New Age Vaudeville
- New Variety
- Oracle Theatre Company
- Organic Theater Company
- Playwrights Theatre Club
- Pyewacket Theatre Company
- The House Theatre of Chicago
- The Practical Theatre Company
- Remains Theatre
- Redmoon Theater
- Wayward Productions (formerly Chicago Fusion Theatre)
- Windy City Performs

Venues

- Academy of Music
- Drury Lane Theatres
- Garrick Theater
- Happy Medium Theatre
- Iroquois Theatre
- Theatre Building Chicago (Purchased by Stage 773)
- Uptown Theatre
