= Sweet Tea: Black Gay Men of the South—An Oral History =

2008 book by E. Patrick Johnson

- Author: E. Patrick Johnson
- Language: English
- Genre: Non-fiction
- Publisher: University of North Carolina Press
- Publication date: 2008
- Publication place: United States
- ISBN: 978-0-807-83209-7

Sweet Tea: Black Gay Men of the South—An Oral History is a 2008 ethnographic oral history of the lives of Black gay men in the Southern United States by scholar and performer E. Patrick Johnson, who himself grew up in rural North Carolina, and is openly gay.

Sweet Tea received a 2009 Stonewall Book Award, for Stonewall Honor Books in Non-Fiction, from the Gay, Lesbian, Bisexual, and Transgender Round Table of the American Library Association. Lambda Literary Foundation noted the book reported a "previously untold sexual history of the South". Gender & Society's review asserts Johnson's research bears out that Black gay men are indeed in the South, and they do not always face hostility. Johnson recorded the audio book in 2009. He has adapted many of the stories from Sweet Tea into a one-man performance based on the narratives, Pouring Tea: Black Gay Men of the South Tell Their Tales. In 2009 Johnson adapted the stories into a full play, Sweet Tea—The Play.

== Background ==
Johnson is the Carlos Montezuma Professor of Performance Studies at Northwestern University. As a performance ethnographer, he researches his subjects and their cultures by empathizing with their point of view, and attempts to share the results through performance.

In 1995 Johnson was in a black, gay, HIV/AIDS outreach event by US Helping US, People Into Living, Inc., in Washington, D.C., when he got to hear a group of older men tell stories of their lives. He lamented that if he had heard them when he was young it would have eased his alienation and isolation of growing up gay. He vowed to return to the south and preserve the stories of black, gay men if he ever had the opportunity. Johnson's states "the paradox of the South is 'the gentility, civility and general "good manners"' that complement 'the region's long history of grotesque racial violence'". Johnson also notes, "the South is frequently associated with a virulent and unrelenting fundamentalism" that is hostile to homosexuality.

== Research ==
Johnson took a two-year sabbatical from his university job to collect the stories. Johnson originally intended to include women in his research but the overwhelming response from men delayed including their stories. In 2012, he started oral history interviews with women that would become Black. Queer. Southern. Women. He edited the stories gathered from 2004 to 2006 from black gay men born and raised in the South, and still lived there. He employed oral histories as the main methodology because Southerners are known for storytelling, as well as gossiping over iced sweet tea, hence the name of the book.

The men range in age from 18 to 83, and "represent an impressive range of educational and occupational levels". He noted that in contrast to Northern United States, his subjects spent much of their youth, and discovering their budding sexuality, outdoors in fields and parks. He said, "It was in the country, so you weren't under the watchful eye of an adult, and it provided opportunities to explore your sexuality that northern urban places don't allow you to do." Being Southern was impactful because of the "southerners' predilection for avoiding topics deemed impolite or unpleasant". In the repressively racial Deep South the men also have to navigate homophobia as a cultural norm. Part of the men's social structure was the Black church, although homophobic, was also a force of positivity, and ironically a place for gay sex and even gay identity with, for instance, musical directors and pastors who were closeted. The religious life of Black Americans plays a fundamental role in the development of their communities. Johnson "speculates that black church choirs have offered gay men a safe place to express outsized emotion and style." For the Black gay man the Black Church was a place of oppression but also nurturing, "sometimes condemned and sometimes celebrated".

The subjects work through "taboos about racialized homosexuality" including "rampant homosex at HBCUs (historically black colleges and universities), in the military, and particularly (and sometimes literally) in the church pews", which proved that gay sex is in the institutions despite beliefs to the contrary. The book's chapters are organized by main themes from the subjects with the common theme to all being their coming out. Other main themes were religion, love, relationships, and sex. He interviewed at least one person from each of fifteen former Confederate States of America, and ranging from small towns to Atlanta, Georgia. Johnson published over sixty oral histories of both closeted and openly gay black men. He organized the stories thematically and "grounds them historiographically". Chapters are themed on childhood, coming out, gender identity, religion, sex, love, and generation.

== Reception ==
In a 2009 review in Gender & Society, Harry Thomas states Johnson "wildly succeeds in demonstrating 'that there is no master narrative of Southern Black gay experience'", and that he ably weaves their stories with "prose that is deeply informed by critical theory on race, gender, and sexuality but that also always remains clear and readable."

Stephanie Cole, in a 2010 Journal of American Ethnic History review, called Sweet Tea a "helpful contribution to the growing literature on gay and lesbian life outside of East and West Coast cities", and noted the book "offers a treasure trove of primary sources for those interested in the intersection of race, region, and gay experience in the twentieth century." She cautioned that because of who was interviewed and when the research could be skewed. Johnson's subjects were gathered starting in university circles and tended to be well-educated. The times of the research, 2004 and 2005, likely also had an impact "as the debate over gay marriage raged and antigay rhetoric escalated."

Karen J. Taylor, in a 2010 review in The Journal of Southern History, states, "though racial violence and patriarchal dominance have repeatedly dragged the South to the brink, Sweet Tea reminds us that those characteristics have been catalysts for the individual agency that has transformed and preserved what was joyous and good about the South."

== Pouring Tea: Black Gay Men of the South Tell Their Tales ==
Johnson wants the subjects and audience to understand his research. He adapted many of the stories from Sweet Tea into a one-man performance based on the narratives, Pouring Tea: Black Gay Men of the South Tell Their Tales. His initial research did not indicate that it was ideal for performance until he had conducted a year's worth of interviews. He stated, "the page could not capture the vocal cadence, verbal ticks, nonverbal cues, and intimacy" that his storytellers had shared. He has performed Pouring Tea at over eighty colleges and universities around the United States, and in front of hundreds of audiences. In it he starts by pouring a glass of sweet tea, in Black Southern slang pouring tea means to gossip, then reenacts their stories "from their body language to their precise accents". Sweet is also a euphemism for gay.

== Sweet Tea—The Play ==
In 2009 Johnson adapted the stories into a full play, rather than a staged reading, called Sweet Tea—The Play, co-produced by About Face Theater and the Ellen Stone Belic Institute for the Study of Women and Gender in the Arts and Media at Columbia College, Chicago. Hesitant at first, he included his own story into the play as he was told that his relationship to the subjects was compelling. The play had its premiere in April 2010. He won the 2010 Bert Williams Award for Best Solo Performance in a Play from The Black Theater Alliance Awards. In 2011, the show had a four-week run at Signature Theatre in Arlington, Virginia.

== Making Sweet Tea ==
Starting back in 2013, possibly earlier, Johnson was working on Making Sweet Tea, a documentary film following the updates of men he interviewed in the 2000s. It is a collaborative effort with John L. Jackson Jr., the Richard Perry University Professor of Communication and Anthropology, Professor of Africana Studies, and Dean of University of Pennsylvania School of Social Policy and Practice. It was completed with the university's Collective for Advancing Multimodal Research Arts (CAMRA).

Jackson saw Johnson performing his one-man play and told him he should incorporate his story in with those of the men he was reporting on "to create the film adaptation of the process and your relationship to the men, of the experiences and interactions that help define black, gay life in the South." The film covers seven men Johnson had interviewed as well as his own story in the 90-minute feature. The film also goes back to Johnson's hometown of Hickory, North Carolina, where he got his start, and developed an interest in oral histories from his grandmother. The score came from Guthrie Ramsey, a music professor at the university, and singer-songwriter Vince Anthony.

Making Sweet Tea by directors John L. Jackson Jr. and doctoral student Nora Gross, will had its world premiere in September 2019 as part of the Reeling LGBTQ film festival, the world's second oldest LGBTQ film festival, where it won their Silver Image award.

== See also ==
- Don't ask, don't tell
- Down-low (sexual slang)
- Men who have sex with men
- Spoken word
