= Western Springs =

Western Springs may refer to:

== Locations ==
- Western Springs, Illinois, a suburb of Chicago

- Western Springs station, a train station in Western Springs
- Western Springs Water Tower, a museum and former water tower in Western Springs

- Western Springs, New Zealand, a suburb of Auckland

- Western Springs College, a secondary school located within Western Springs
- Western Springs Reserve, a major park located within Western Springs
- Western Springs Stadium, a venue located within Western Springs

== Sports teams ==
- Western Springs AFC, a football club in Auckland, New Zealand
