= Happy Medium Theatre =

Coordinates: 41.8993°N 87.6266°W

The Happy Medium Theatre, also known as The Happy Medium and the Happy Medium Discotheque, was a theatre and nightclub located in Chicago, Illinois at 901 N. Rush St. 60611. Founded by George and Oscar Marienthal, it opened as a jazz nightclub in 1959 and became a legitimate theatre in 1960. It principally operated as a venue for small scale musicals of the cabaret variety and less frequently plays until 1974 when Paul G. Magit reimagined it as a concert venue. In its later years it operated as two distinct venues under a single organization. Its lower floor was used as a performance space for primarily jazz musicians in connection with Joe Segal's Jazz Showcase, and its upper floor was a disco nightclub. It closed in the early 1980s; sometime after October 1981.

== History ==
The Happy Medium Theatre (HMT) was owned by brothers George and Oscar Marienthal who also owned Mister Kelly's and London House. It was designed and built by architect Bertrand Goldberg in 1959. It originally operated as a jazz nightclub without much success; partly because the economics of jazz venues required black audiences, and the theatre was located in a predominantly white neighborhood avoided by African-Americans. It 1960 it became a legitimate theatre venue, and was predominantly known for original musicals in the 1960s.

On June 30, 1960, the HMT premiered the musical revue Medium Rare; a popular hit which ran for 101 1/2 weeks for a total of 1,210 performances. It was a record-breaking run for theatre in Chicago at that time. The original cast included Anne Meara, Bobo Lewis, and Jerry Stiller. Virginia Vestoff joined the cast of Medium Rare towards the end of its run in January 1963, and then led the cast of a new revue at the theatre, Put It In Writing, which premiered the following March. It too was successful and ran for 17 months in 1963–1964. It was followed by the musical Three Cheers for the Tired Businessman (1964) starring Tom Williams, and E. Duke Vincent's Love is A Three Letter Word (1964–1965).

In 1966 the HMT presented a jazz musical revue conceived by and starring Oscar Brown entitled Joy '66. The cast of actor-musicians included Brown's wife, the actress and singer Jean Pace, the Brazilian jazz percussionist Dom Um Romão, musical theatre composer and upright bass player Ernest McCarty, and drummer Curtis Boyd. It was a modest success; running for 31 weeks. Less successful that year, was Mary Rodgers's The Mad Show starring Betty Aberlin, Fiddle Viracola, Ted Schwartz, Lew Horn, and Jay Devlin. In 1967 the HMT staged Ted Schwartz and Jay Devlin's musical revue Bon Voyage Titanic. After this the theatre was used as a venue for touring acts of varying kinds. Performers who appeared at the venue included Wayne Cochran and the C.C. Riders (1967), comic duo Patchett & Tarses (1968), and singer Chad Mitchell (1968).

In September 1968 the HMT made a return to musical theatre with an acclaimed production of Jacques Brel is Alive and Well and Living in Paris; a work which had debuted earlier that year Off-Broadway in New York City and which maintained most of the original New York cast for its run at the HMT. A critical and commercial success for the HMT, it ran for 18-month period; closing in February 1970. In 1969 HMT came under the management of House of Lords Inc.; a company owned and managed by Eleanor Ettinger and Sam Nudel. In May 1970 Max Morath brought his one-man show, Max Morath at the Turn of the Century to the HMT, and in August 1970 Oscar Brown and his wife returned to the HMT with the revue Joy. That same year the theatre presented two plays in a double bill: Elaine May's Adaptation and Terrence McNally's Next.

In 1972 the theatre introduced a production of Don't Bother Me, I Can't Cope starring Loleatta Holloway. A hit, it ran for 64 weeks; closing on New Year's Eve 1973. In 1973 the HMT became the venue for Joe Segal's Jazz Showcase; presenting Sonny Rollins in the basement of the theatre which had been turned into a jazz club. Segal would periodically use the HMT for his Jazz Showcase concerts; including performances by Ornette Coleman (1974), the New York Jazz Ensemble (1974, led by Roland Hanna), Kenny Burrell (1975), and Tito Puente (1978). Other productions presented at the HMT included What's a Nice Country Like You Doing in a State Like This? (1974), The Boys in the Band (1974), and Victor Power's The Escape (1974).

Paul G. Magit leased the theatre from House of Lords Inc. in 1974, and it underwent significant renovations at that time. It reopened as the Happy Medium with the word theatre dropped, the lower floor was rebranded Jazz at the Medium and the upstairs theatre space was turned into a rock-oriented club known as PBM. Musicians who performed concerts at the HM included Minnie Riperton (1974), Maggie Bell (1974), Steeleye Span (1974), Renaissance (1974), Chris Jagger (1974), Syreeta Wright (1974), Jobriath (1974), Stan Getz (1975), Spike Jones Jr. (1975), Margie Gibson (1975), Elvin Jones (1975), and Count Basie (1975). Comedians also occasionally were booked into the theatre; among them Bill Daily Robert Klein (1974), and Pudgy (aka Beverly Wines, 1981). Magit wanted to purchase the HM and permanently change it into a concert venue, but was unable to raise enough capital to pursue that course.

By 1976 HMT rebranded itself again as the Happy Medium Discotheque, with the upper floor of the venue operating as a disco nightclub while the lower part of the venue maintained its dedication to Jazz Showcase. After an absence of many years, musical theatre returned to the HMT in 1980 with a production of the revue El Grande de Coca-Cola. The HMT closed in the early 1980s. One of the last performances at the venue was the Dinah Washington tribute concert Sasha! Sings Dinah featuring singer Sasha Dalton which ran from February 1981 through October 1981. In July 1981 the HMT presented the Black Ensemble Theater Company's productions of Jackie Taylor's In the Spirit of Living and Taylor's Play Song 82.
