= E. Patrick Johnson =

American academic

- Born: March 1, 1967 (age 59); Hickory, North Carolina, U.S.
- Education: University of North Carolina, Chapel Hill, Louisiana State University
- Occupations: Scholar, artist
- Website: http://epatrickjohnson.com/

Elondust Patrick Johnson (born March 1, 1967) is an American academic scholar and artist best known as the creator of Quare theory. He is dean of the School of Communication and Annenberg University Professor of Performance Studies and African-American studies at Northwestern University. Johnson is the founding director of the Black Arts Consortium at Northwestern. His scholarly and artistic contributions focus on performance studies, African-American studies and women, gender and sexuality studies.

== Early life ==
Elondust Patrick Johnson was born on March 1, 1967, in Hickory, North Carolina, to Sarah M. Johnson. She worked as a factory worker. He is the youngest of seven siblings. They grew up in a one-bedroom apartment in Ridgeview, a majority-Black section of Hickory. He was mentored by black women in the Ridgeview Community, including Z. Ann Hoyle, who became the first black alderman of Hickory's city council. After graduating from Hickory High School in 1985, Johnson attended the University of North Carolina at Chapel Hill. He graduated with a B.A. in 1989 and M.A. in 1991 in speech communication. He then went to Louisiana State University and received his Ph.D in speech communication in 1996.

== Career ==
Johnson became an assistant professor of English at Amherst College. In 2000, he joined the faculty of the performance studies department at Northwestern University as assistant professor, then received tenure and a joint appointment in African-American studies in 2003. From 2003 to 2006 and 2014 to 2016, he served as the director of graduate studies for the department of performance studies. He served as the chair of performance studies from 2006 to 2011. Johnson was promoted to full professor of African-American studies and performance studies in 2007 before becoming the Carlos Montezuma Professor of African-American Studies and Performance Studies in 2011. He was appointed dean of the School of Communication and Annenberg University Professor at Northwestern University, Evanston, Illinois, on August 1, 2020.

== Personal life ==
Johnson is married to Stephen J. Lewis. Lewis is an arts and media producer at Northwestern and writes articles for the university. Johnson mentions him in the acknowledgment of some of his books.

== Influence ==
Johnson's introduction of "quare" as a theoretical concept became particularly influential in the fields of queer theory, women, gender, and sexuality studies, and black studies. Originally published in Text & Performance Quarterly, "'Quare' Studies, Or (Almost) Everything I Know About Queer Studies I Learned From My Grandmother" went on to be reprinted numerous times. "Quare" signaled a significant departure from the lack of engagement with race and class by queer theorists and with gender and sexuality among black studies scholars.

== Research ==
Johnson's first book, Appropriating Blackness: Performance and the Politics of Authenticity, examines how blackness is appropriated and performed within and outside African American culture. It won the Lilla A. Heston Award and the Errol Hill Award.

His second book, Sweet Tea: Black Gay Men of the South—An Oral History (2008), is an ethnographic oral history of the lives of black gay men in the US South, a traditionally uninterrogated region. This book received the Stonewall Book Award from the Lesbian, Gay, Bisexual and Transgender Round Table of the American Library Association.

Published in 2005 with Mae G. Henderson, Black Queer Studies: A Critical Anthology interrogates the experiences of black queer people whose subjectivities, beliefs, struggles, triumphs and desires had not previously been interrogated by either queer theory or Black studies. The anthology includes writings from scholars including Cathy Cohen, Kara Keeling, Roderick Ferguson, Rinaldo Walcott, and Dwight McBride.

Published in 2014 with Ramon H. Rivera-Servera, solo/black/woman: scripts, interviews and essays is a collection of writings that feature seven solo performances by emerging and established feminist performance artists from the past three decades. The book received an honorable mention for the Errol Hill Book Award.

In 2013, Johnson published Cultural Struggles: Performance, Ethnography, Praxis, an edited collection of essays written by Dwight Conquergood, who selected Johnson to publish his work before his death in 2004. Conquergood was an ethnographer in the field of performance studies whose ethnographic methods focused on power, privilege, and researcher reflexivity/responsibility.

Published in 2016, No Tea, No Shade: New Writings in Black Queer Studies features the next generation of black queer theorists who follow in the lineage of writings in Black Queer Studies: A Critical Anthology. The text was a finalist for the Lambda Literary Award and features pieces by Amber Jamilla Musser, Omise'eke Natasha Tinsley, Jafari Sinclaire Allen, Lyndon Gill and Marlon M. Bailey.

Published in 2016, Blacktino Queer Performance (with Ramon H. Rivera-Servera) is a collection of nine performance scripts by established and emerging black and Latina/o queer playwrights and performance artists. Each script is accompanied by an interview and critical essay by scholars across a range of interdisciplinary fields.

Published in 2018, Black. Queer. Southern. Women—An Oral History examines the experiences of black women who love other women and live in the American South. In this text, Johnson employed similar methods (ethnographic oral history) as he did in Sweet Tea.

== Creative scholarship ==
=== Sweet Tea—The Play ===
Inspired to present a more comprehensive version of Sweet Tea and the men that Johnson interviewed, in 2006 he created a solo Reader's Theater performance, called Pouring Tea: Black Gay Men of the South Tell Their Tales, based on selected stories of the men that he interviewed. Pouring Tea toured across the country to over 100 universities, conferences and events over a decade. In 2010, in collaboration with Jane M. Saks, Columbia College and About Face Theatre Company in Chicago, Johnson developed the show into full production called Sweet Tea—The Play. After its Chicago debut, the show traveled to the Warfield Center (2010) in Austin, Texas; Signature Theater in Arlington, Virginia in 2011; Dixon Place in New York City (2012); the Durham Arts Council (2014); Rites and Reasons Theater in Providence, Rhode Island (2014); Towne Street Theater in Hollywood, California (2015); Northwestern University's Wirtz Center (2015); and the National Black Theatre Festival in Winston-Salem, North Carolina (2015). Johnson won the Black Theater Alliance Bert Williams Award for Best Solo Performance for the show in 2010.

=== Honey Pot ===
This text (2019) is the creative nonfiction companion to Black. Queer. Southern. Women—An Oral History. The story is loosely based on women who participated in Johnson's study.

== Bibliography ==
=== Books ===
- Honeypot: Black Southern Women Who Love Women, University of North Carolina Press, 2019.
- Black. Queer. Southern. Women.: An Oral History, University of North Carolina Press, 2019.
- Sweet Tea: Black Gay Men of the South—An Oral History, University of North Carolina Press, 2008.
- Appropriating Blackness: Performance and the Politics of Authenticity. Duke University Press, 2003.

=== Edited collections ===
- Blacktino Queer Performance (with Ramon Rivera-Servera). Duke University Press, 2016.
- No Tea, No Shade: New Writings in Black Queer Studies. Duke University Press, 2016.
- Cultural Struggles: Performance, Ethnography, Praxis. Edited collection of essays by Dwight Conquergood. University of Michigan Press, 2013.
- solo/black/woman: scripts, interviews, essays. (with Ramon Rivera-Servera), Northwestern University Press, 2013.
- Black Queer Studies: A Critical Anthology. (with Mae G. Henderson), Duke University Press, 2005.

=== Journal articles ===
- "Put a Little Honey in My Sweet Tea: Oral History as Quare Performance." Women's Studies Quarterly 44.3/4 (Fall/Winter 2016): 51–67.
- "In Search of My Queer Fathers (In Response to Bishop Eddie Long)." Cultural Studies <-> Critical Methodologies 14.2 (April 2014): 124 -127.
- "To Be Young, Gifted, and Queer: Race and Sex in the New Black Studies." The Black Scholar 44.2 (Summer 2014): 50 – 58.
- "Pleasure and Pain in Black Queer Oral History and Performance." (with Jason Ruiz) QED: A Journal of GLBTQ Worldmaking 1.2 (Summer 2014): 160 – 170.
- "After You've Done All You Can: On Queer Performance and Censorship." Text and Performance Quarterly 33.3 (July 2013): 212–213.
- "A Revelatory Distillation of Experience." Women's Studies Quarterly 40.3 (2012): 311–314.
- "From Page to Stage: The Making of Sweet Tea." Text and Performance Quarterly 32.3 (2012): 248–253.
- "Queer Epistemologies: Theorizing the Self from a Writerly Place Called Home." Biography 34.3 (2011): 429–446.
- "Poor 'Black' Theatre." Theatre History Studies 30 (2010): 1 - 13.
- "Stranger Blues: Otherness, Pedagogy, and a Sense of Home." TriQuarterly 131 (2008): 112–127.
- "The Pot Calling the Kettle 'Black'." Theatre Journal, 57.4 (2005): 605–608.
- "Specter of the Black Fag: Parody, Blackness, & Homo/Heterosexual B(r)others." Journal of Homosexuality 45.2/3/4 (2003): 217–234.
- "Strange Fruit: A Performance About Identity Politics." The Drama Review, T178 (Summer) 2003: 88–116.
- "Performing Blackness Down Under: The Café of the Gate of Salvation." Text and Performance Quarterly 22 (April 2002): 99–119. Reprinted in 21st Century African American Social Issues: A Reader. Ed. Anita McDaniel and Clyde McDaniel. New York: Thompson Custom Printing, 2003.
- "'Quare' Studies Or (Almost) Everything I Know About Queer Studies I Learned From My Grandmother." Text and Performance Quarterly 21 (January 2001): 1-25. Reprinted in Readings on Rhetoric and Performance. Ed. Stephen Olbrys Gencarella and Phaedra C. Pezzullo. State College, PA: Strata, 2010. 233–257. The Ashgate Research Companion to Queer Theory. Ed. Noreen Giffney and Michael O'Rourke. Farnham, England: Ashgate Publishing Company, 2009. 451–469. Sexualities and Communication in Everyday Life: A Reader. Ed. Karen Lovaas and Mercilee Jenkins. Thousand Oaks, CA: Sage Publications, 2006. 69–86, 297–300. Black Queer Studies: A Critical Anthology. Ed. E. Patrick Johnson and Mae G. Henderson. Durham: Duke University Press, 2005. 124–157.
- "Feeling the Spirit in the Dark: Expanding Notions of the Sacred in the African American Gay Community." Callaloo 21.2 (Winter/Spring 1998): 399–416. Reprinted in The Greatest Taboo: Homosexuality in Black Communities. Ed. Delroy Constantine-Simms. Los Angeles: Alyson Publications, 2000. 88–109.
- "Getting Past the Gate(s): Inclusion/Exclusion in the African American Theoretical Canon of Henry Louis Gates." Warpland: A Journal of Black Literature and Ideas 2 (October 1996): 131–140.
- "SNAP! Culture: A Different Kind of Reading." Text and Performance Quarterly 15 (April 1995): 21–42.
- "Wild Women Don't Get the Blues: A Blues Analysis of Gayl Jones' Eva's Man." OBSIDIAN II: Black Literature in Review 9 (Spring/Summer 1994): 26–46.

== Other work ==
Johnson has served on tenure and promotion evaluations, completed administrative service for Northwestern, and served as an associate editor for publications including Text & Performance Quarterly, Sexualities, Cultural Studies, and Gay & Lesbian Quarterly.

He is a member of several professional organizations including the American Society for Theatre Research, American Studies Association, Association for Theatre in Higher Education, Cultural Studies Association, Mid America Theater Association, Modern Language Association, and National Communication Association.

Johnson has served as convener for academic conferences including Black Queer Studies in the Millennium Conference, Black Feminist Performance, Creative Ethnography, and Black Arts International: Temporalities and Territories.

== Honors ==
- In 1996 the Hickory City Council honored Johnson with his own day, citing his accomplishments as the first African American born and raised in Hickory to earn a Ph.D.
- Awarded "Esteem Outstanding Service Award" in 2010
- Awarded "Leslie Irene Coger Award for Distinguished Performance" in 2010
- Awarded "Bert Williams Award for Best Solo Performance in a play, Sweet Tea: Black Gay Men of the South" in 2010
- In 2010, Johnson was inducted into the Chicago Lesbian, Gay, Bisexual, and Transgender Hall of Fame "for his leadership in the African-American LGBT community."
- Awarded "Otto Reneé Castillo Award for Political Theatre" in 2014
- In 2015, Johnson received the Oscar Brockett Award for Outstanding Teaching from the Association of Theatres in Higher Education.
- Awarded "Stonewall Honor Books in Non-Fiction" for Black Queer Southern Women: An Oral History in 2019

== See also ==
- Quare theory
