= Lisa Beasley =

American actress, comedian and writer

- Born: 1986 (age 39–40); Gary, Indiana, U.S.
- Education: American Musical and Dramatic Academy
- Occupations: Writer, actress, comedian

Lisa Beasley (born 1986) is an American actress, comedian, and writer based in Chicago, Illinois. She is known for her original comedy videos shared on social media, including her satirical impressions of Margaret Thatcher and Lori Lightfoot, and for the original character Corporate Erin.

== Early life and education ==
Beasley was born and raised in Gary, Indiana and attended high school at Emerson School for the Visual and Performing Arts. She completed her bachelor's degree in jazz in 2008, then moved to Los Angeles and completed the musical/theater program at American Musical and Dramatic Academy.

== Career ==
Beasley began her professional acting career in Chicago as a performer at the Black-owned theater company ETA Creative Arts Foundation. She was next hired at Black Ensemble Theater for both children's performances and the main stage. She also worked as a freelance graphic designer. Beasley went on to train and work at the Second City. In 2015 she was a touring member for the Second City's National Touring Company team BlueCo. She was also a member of the improv group 3peat, who created the viral sketch "The Blackening" (the source material for the 2022 film adaptation), which was produced for Comedy Central. She continued to work and perform and left for a time in 2016 due to frustration with the working conditions.

She began to gain attention for posting comedic videos to her social media accounts in 2020. Her impression of Margaret Thatcher went viral in fall 2020. In particular, her TikTok parody videos of then-mayor Lori Lightfoot (as the character "Lory Litefoot") began to go viral. The videos were partly inspired by Beasley's frustration with the mayor's performance. She was hired around the city to perform as the character. After one of her viral videos about Lightfoot's skirmishes with the Chicago Public School (CPS) parents and teachers union, she sponsored The Teachers' Appreciation Comedy Show at the Laugh Factory to benefit CPS teachers.

Her character Corporate Erin, a satire of passive aggressive micromanagers that overuse jargon and constantly deliver bad news, first appeared in 2021 but went viral in late 2023. One video has approximately nine million views on TikTok in part because the character feels familiar to many viewers. She appeared in character as Erin on WGN Morning News.

Beasley has acted on Chicago Med and in original sketch videos with the improv troupe 3peat. She was a recurring character on the series South Side.

== Personal life ==
Beasley resides on the South Side of Chicago. She has a daughter. In 2026 she had her second daughter with her husband, Andre Hamilton.

== Accolades ==
- 2024 – People's Voice Winner (Social - Comedy), Webby Awards
