= Quare theory =

Discipline of queer theory

Quare theory was created by E. Patrick Johnson in 2001. Quare theory was created to promote the voices of queer people of color.

Quare theory is similar to queer theory; they are both forms of critical theory that focus on the study and theories of queer identities and actions. E. Patrick Johnson believed that within queer theory there was an erasure or minimization of queer people of color's voices. Johnson created Quare theory to uplift the voices that queer theory historically hadn't. With Queer theory there is "a significant theoretical gap" meaning queer theorists often silence or lessen the voices of queer people of color.

== History ==
Quare theory was created by E. Patrick Johnson who is a scholar and artist who studies gender, race, and sexuality performance. Johnson has written several books in the focus of his studies. He focuses on gender, race, and sexuality performance "modes of scholarly and artistic production". He is a professor at Annenberg University for performance studies as well as a professor at Northwestern University for African American studies. Besides being a professor, Johnson is also Dean of the School of Communication at Northwestern University. In 2020, Johnson was inducted into the American Academy of Arts and Sciences.

Johnson proposed quare theory to fill the gap left by queer theory. Johnson's essay on Quare studies proposes to address queer behavior and history from people of color's perspectives. The term quare was inspired from Johnson's grandmother because when she said the word queer with her accent it sounded like she said quare.

== Definition ==
Quare theory is focused on "the racialized bodies, experiences, and knowledge of" queer people of color. It's a perspective that's meant to shed light upon marginalized voices. The theory "narrows the gap between theory and practice" and highlights the performance aspect of the body. Quare theory focuses on uplifting and addressing the needs of queer people "across issues of race, gender, class, and other subject positions".

== Quare vs queer theory ==
Quare theory is "both a counter theory" and "a counternarrative to queer theory". Johnson discusses in his essay regarding Quare theory that queer theory, whether intentionally or not, does not include queer people of color's voices. With Quare studies, Johnson intended to increase the exposure of queer people of color and their issues. Quare studies explores different identities focusing on queer people from "racialized and class knowledges". Quare studies fills in the gaps that queer theory left empty.

== E. Patrick Johnson's works relating to quare theory ==
Books:

- Honeypot: Black Southern Women Who Love Women, University of North Carolina Press, 2019.
- Black. Queer. Southern. Women.: An Oral History, University of North Carolina Press, 2019.
- Sweet Tea: Black Gay Men of the South—An Oral History, University of North Carolina Press, 2008.
- Appropriating Blackness: Performance and the Politics of Authenticity. Duke University Press, 2003.

Edited Collections:

- Blacktino Queer Performance (with Ramon Rivera-Servera). Duke University Press, 2016.
- No Tea, No Shade: New Writings in Black Queer Studies. Duke University Press, 2016.
- Cultural Struggles: Performance, Ethnography, Praxis. Edited collection of essays by Dwight Conquergood. University of Michigan Press, 2013.
- solo/black/woman: scripts, interviews, essays. (with Ramon Rivera-Servera), Northwestern University Press, 2013.
- Black Queer Studies: A Critical Anthology. (with Mae G. Henderson), Duke University Press, 2005.

Journal Articles:

- "Put a Little Honey in My Sweet Tea: Oral History as Quare Performance." Women's Studies Quarterly 44.3/4 (Fall/Winter 2016): 51–67.
- "Pleasure and Pain in Black Queer Oral History and Performance." (with Jason Ruiz) QED: A Journal of GLBTQ Worldmaking 1.2 (Summer 2014): 160 – 170.
- "'Quare' Studies Or (Almost) Everything I Know About Queer Studies I Learned From My Grandmother." Text and Performance Quarterly 21 (January 2001): 1-25. Reprinted in Readings on Rhetoric and Performance. Ed. Stephen Olbrys Gencarella and Phaedra C. Pezzullo. State College, PA: Strata, 2010. 233–257. The Ashgate Research Companion to Queer Theory. Ed. Noreen Giffney and Michael O'Rourke. Farnham, England: Ashgate Publishing Company, 2009. 451–469. Sexualities and Communication in Everyday Life: A Reader. Ed. Karen Lovaas and Mercilee Jenkins. Thousand Oaks, CA: Sage Publications, 2006. 69–86, 297–300. Black Queer Studies: A Critical Anthology. Ed. E. Patrick Johnson and Mae G. Henderson. Durham: Duke University Press, 2005. 124–157.
- "Feeling the Spirit in the Dark: Expanding Notions of the Sacred in the African American Gay Community." Callaloo 21.2 (Winter/Spring 1998): 399–416. Reprinted in The Greatest Taboo: Homosexuality in Black Communities. Ed. Delroy Constantine-Simms. Los Angeles: Alyson Publications, 2000. 88–109.

== Works featuring the application of Quare Theory ==
Carmichael, Tristin Ralpheal (2024-04-20). "A quare theory analysis of black gay men college students at predominantly white institutions". International Journal of Qualitative Studies in Education. 37 (4): 1046–1060. doi:10.1080/09518398.2023.2178686. ISSN 0951-8398.

Mobley, Steve D.; Njoku, Nadréa R.; Johnson, Jennifer M.; Patton, Lori D., eds. (2025). Embracing queer students' diverse identities at historically Black colleges and universities: a primer for presidents, administrators, and faculty. New Brunswick: Rutgers University Press. ISBN 978-1-9788-1609-1.

Thomas, Emily (2022-07-08). "Quare(-in) the Mainstream: Deconstructing New Media in Lil Nas X's MONTERO". Sonic Scope: New Approaches to Audiovisual Culture. doi:10.21428/66f840a4.75cc622c.

McMickens, Taisha (2020-01-01). "A Black Feminist Quare Interrogation of Stud Misogyny in Black Queer Web Series". Electronic Theses and Dissertations.

== See also ==
- E. Patrick Johnson
- Queer theory
- Critical theory
