= Boucek =

Boucek is a surname. Notable people with the surname include:

- Emil J. Boucek (1917–2005), American politician
- Jaroslav Bouček (1912–1987), Czech footballer
- Jenny Boucek (born 1973), American basketball player and coach
- Zdeněk Bouček (1924–2011), Czech entomologist
