= BTAA =

BTAA may refer to:

- Big Ten Academic Alliance
- Black Theater Alliance Awards
- British Television Advertising Awards
- British Travelgoods and Accessories Association
