= Geraldine Bey =

American jazz singer and concert organizer (1935–2026)

Geraldine Bey de Haas

Background information
- Born: Geraldine Wideman; January 16, 1935; Newark, New Jersey, U.S.
- Died: July 28, 2026 (aged 91) Englewood, New Jersey, U.S.
- Genres: Jazz
- Occupations: Musician, singer, concert organizer
- Years active: 1964–2026
- Label: Prestige
- Spouse: Eddie de Haas (m. 1968; died 2022)

Geraldine Bey de Haas (née Wideman; January 16, 1935 – July 28, 2026) referred to as the First Lady’ of Chicago Jazz was an American jazz singer and concert organizer.

== Early life ==
Geraldine Wideman was born on Jan. 16, 1935, in Newark. Her father, a window washer born Andrew Wideman, was a member of the Moorish Science Temple of America, an offshoot of Islam, and followed its practice of adopting Bey as a surname; Geraldine took that surname as well, though she did not join the denomination. Her mother, Victoria (Johnson) Wideman, managed the home.

== Career ==
Bey performed with the vocal trio Andy and the Bey Sisters with brother Andy Bey and sister Salome Bey in the 1960s. Then she married Eddie de Haas, with whom she settled in Chicago in 1968.

In 1974, she created the Duke Ellington Celebration in Grant Park there, from which the Chicago Jazz Festival developed. She also organized other concerts and performance opportunities for young musicians and founded the jazz festival at the South Shore Cultural Center in 1981. Between 1959 and 1965, she was involved in seven recordings. She also joined Free Street Theater Company as an actor. In the early 1970s, she appeared in several major musicals through Free Street and other companies, including “Hair,” “Show Boat” and “Don’t Bother Me, I Can’t Cope.”

With her husband, bassist Eddie de Haas, she had two children, Aisha and Darius, both singers. Darius has also performed on Broadway musicals.

Eddie died in 2022. Bey died at Englewood Hospital and Medical Center on July 28, 2026, at the age of 91.

== Discography ==
- Andy and the Bey Sisters Now! Hear! (Prestige, 1964) with Jerome Richardson, Kenny Burrell
- Andy and the Bey Sisters Round Midnight (Prestige, 1965) with Kenny Burrell, Milt Hinton, Osie Johnson
- Frank D'Rone and Geraldine DeHaas with Bob Perna and Persistance Finally Together (Nor-AM 1996)
