= Jackie Taylor =

Jackie Taylor is the name of:

- Jackie Taylor (actress), founder of the Black Ensemble Theater
- Jackie Taylor (90210), a character on Beverly Hills, 90210
- Jackie Lynn Taylor (1925–2014), American former child actress
- Jackie Taylor (politician) (1935–2008), Oregon politician
