= Darius de Haas =

American actor

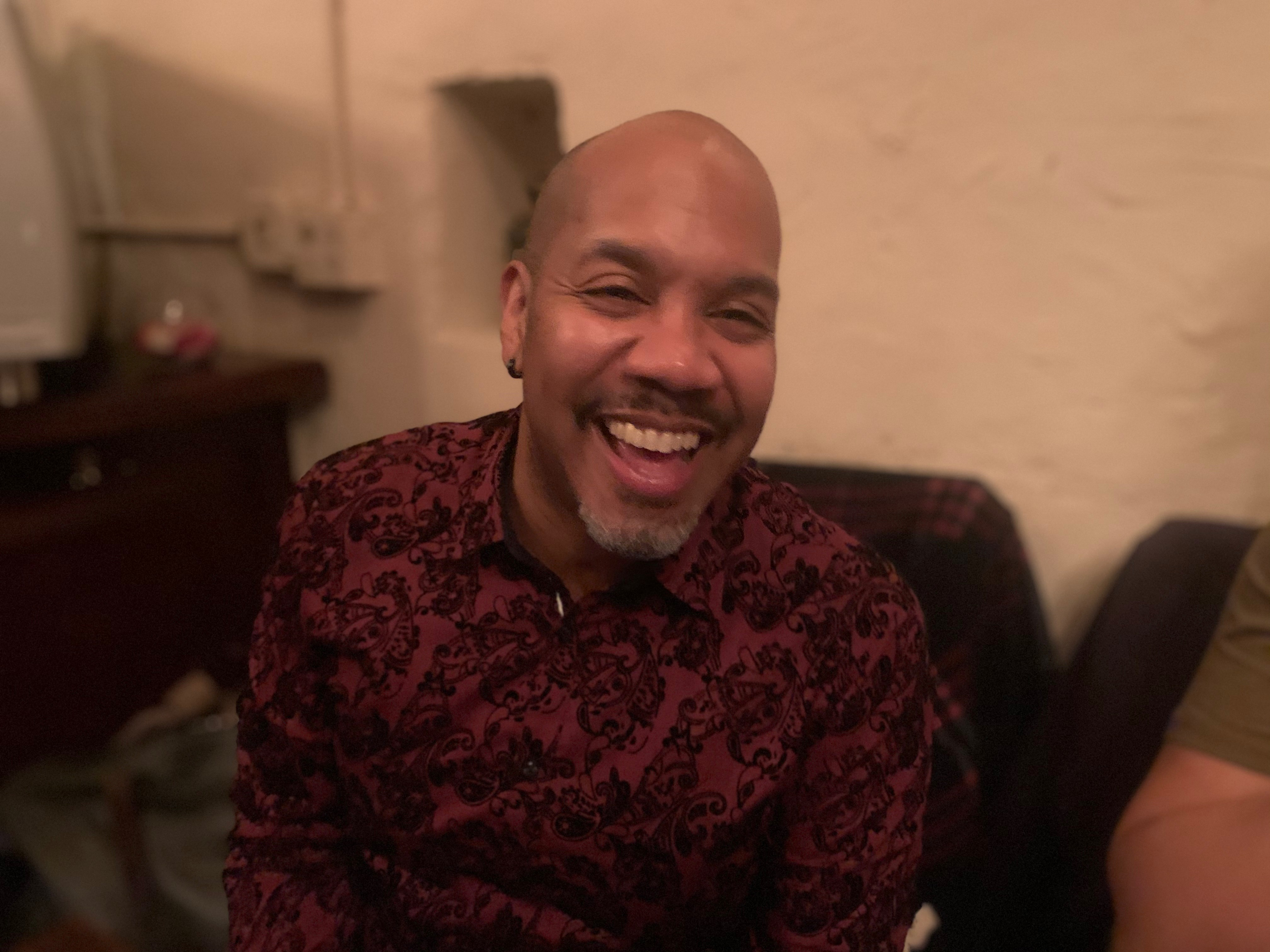
- Darius de Haas in 2020
- Born: September 29, 1968 (age 58); Chicago, Illinois, U.S.
- Occupations: Stage, film, tv actor, singer
- Website: dariusdehaas.com

Darius de Haas (born September 29, 1968) is an American stage actor and singer.

== Biography ==
Haas was born in Chicago and raised in a musical family — his father is bassist Eddie de Haas and his mother, Geraldine Bey, was one of the Bey sisters of the musical trio Andy and The Bey Sisters. De Haas is especially noted for his extremely wide vocal range. He appeared in the Broadway productions of Rent, Kiss of the Spider Woman, Carousel, Marie Christine, Shuffle Along, or the Making of the Musical Sensation of 1921 and All That Followed, and the Paper Mill Playhouse cast of Children of Eden. He won an Obie Award in 1999 for his performance in the title role in Diedre Murray's jazz opera Running Man and played Jesus in the Alliance Theatre's re-imagining of Webber-Rice's Jesus Christ Superstar (re-titled JCS Gospel). In recent years he has become known as a concert/recording artist, singing with several symphonies including the Cincinnati Pops and Boston Pops, having notably performed and recorded the music of Billy Strayhorn and Stevie Wonder. He provides the singing voice for the character of Shy Baldwin on Amazon’s The Marvelous Mrs. Maisel.

== Discography ==
- New Singers – New Songs 1994 by Wolfgang Lackerschmid and Donald Johnston (1994) - Featured on multiple tracks
- Day Dream (2002)
- Quiet Please (w/ Steven Blier) (2010)
- What I Wanna Be When I Grow Up by Scott Alan, singing the song "Take Me Away" (2010)
- Darius de Haas, Rene Marie, Karen Oberlin, Janis Siegel, Ice on the Hudson: Songs by Renee Rosnes and David Hajdu (SMK, 2018)
- Thirteen Stories Down – The Songs Of Jonathan Reid Gealt by Jonathan Reid Gealt, singing the song "Wanting" (2010)
- The Marvelous Mrs Maisel Soundtrack Season 3 (Shy Baldwin singing voice) (2019)
- Original Music From The Marvelous Mrs Maisel Season 3 (Shy Baldwin singing voice) (2020)
