= 1984 United States Senate election in Wyoming =

- November 6, 1984
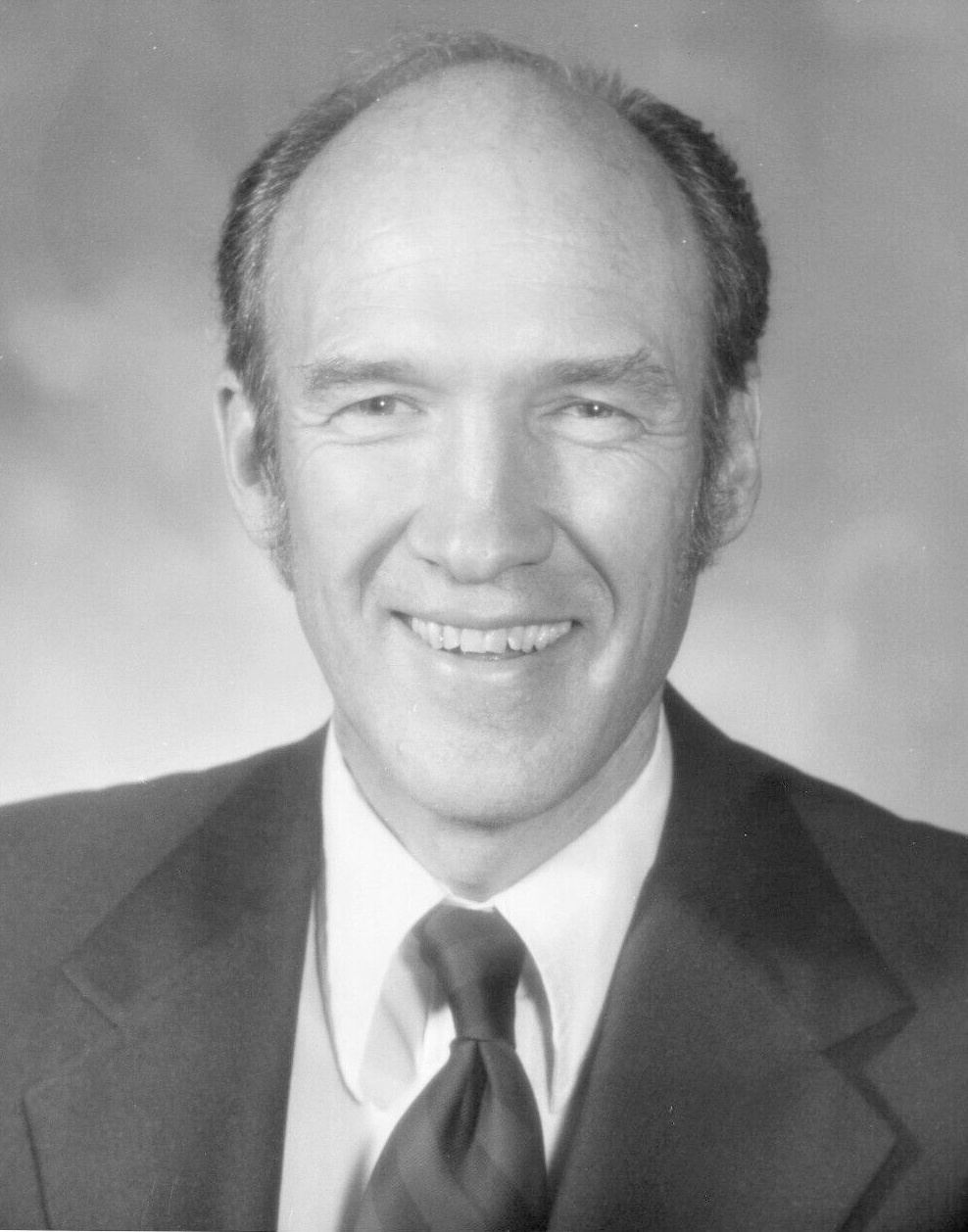

| Nominee | Alan Simpson | Victor Ryan |
| Party | Republican | Democratic |
| Popular vote | 146,373 | 40,525 |
| Percentage | 78.32% | 21.68% |
- County results Simpson: 60–70% 70–80% 80–90%
U.S. senator before election
Alan Simpson
Republican
Elected U.S. Senator
Alan Simpson
Republican

The 1984 United States Senate election in Wyoming took place on November 6, 1984. Incumbent Republican U.S. Senator Alan Simpson was re-elected to a second term in office, defeating Democrat Victor Ryan in a landslide, winning 78.32% of votes and outperforming Republican President Ronald Reagan’s vote share in the concurrent presidential race by 7.81%.

== Republican primary ==
=== Candidates ===
- Alan Simpson, incumbent Senator
- Stephen Tarver

=== Results ===
Republican primary results
| Party | Candidate | Votes | % |
|---|---|---|---|
| Republican | Alan Simpson (incumbent) | 66,178 | 87.87% |
| Republican | Stephen Tarver | 9,137 | 12.13% |
| Total votes | | 75,315 | 100.00% |

== Democratic primary ==
=== Candidates ===
- Michael J. Dee, Republican candidate for U.S. Representative in 1982
- Al Hamburg, perennial candidate
- Victor Ryan, chemistry professor

=== Results ===
Democratic primary results
| Party | Candidate | Votes | % |
|---|---|---|---|
| Democratic | Victor Ryan | 17,608 | 45.29% |
| Democratic | Al Hamburg | 12,088 | 31.09% |
| Democratic | Michael J. Dee | 9,187 | 23.63% |
| Total votes | | 38,883 | 100.00% |

== General election ==
=== Results ===
1984 United States Senate election in Wyoming
| Party | Candidate | Votes | % | ±% |
|---|---|---|---|---|
| Republican | Alan Simpson (incumbent) | 146,373 | 78.32% | ▲16.15 |
| Democratic | Victor Ryan | 40,525 | 21.68% | ▼16.15 |
| Total votes | | 186,898 | 100.00% | |
| Republican hold | | Swing | | |

== See also ==
- 1984 United States Senate elections
