= The Theatre of Western Springs =

The Theatre of Western Springs is a community theatre located in Western Springs, Illinois, United States. It has been in existence since 1929, making it one of the oldest on-going community theatres in the country. It features main stage productions, children’s theatre and high school repertory productions with summer camp opportunities, educational workshops and a performance series showcasing well known entertainers. It offers a 359 seat auditorium, a 117 seat black-box space and outdoor performance areas.

The Theatre of Western Springs is a member of Arts Midwest and American Association of Community Theatres.

== History ==
The Theatre of Western Springs, originally named "The Little Theatre of Western Springs", was founded in 1929 by Mary Cattell, a local resident who had studied at several theatre schools. While studying directing under Ivan Lazaroff, founder of the Chicago Art Theatre, she learned the principles used at the Moscow Art Theatre, particularly the training of actors in a studio system setting, and was encouraged to start a theatre of her own, leading to the founding of The Theatre of Western Springs. In 1946, the Children's Theatre of Western Springs was added, and included classes in acting technique, dance and movement, and scene design and construction.

Originally performing in the Western Springs Village Club, the Theatre recognized that it would need its own building and began fundraising for this purpose in 1957. The land it currently rests on was purchased that year. In 1976, the addition of a studio theatre allowed it to expand its offerings.

== Notable actors ==
The following notable actors have appeared at The Theatre of Western Springs:

- Chloe Baldwin
- Brian Dennehy
- Patty Duke
- Nora Dunn
- David Eigenberg
- Felicia Fields
- Henry Fonda
- Mitzi Hamilton
- Michael Hitchcock
- Lauren Patten
- Paul Raci

== Production seasons ==
The last five production seasons, including the current, are listed below:

2026 - 2027 Season

- Barefoot in the Park
- Veronica's Room
- Working (A Musical)
- MacBeth
- What Happened After Once Upon a Time
- Rodgers and Hammerstein's Cinderella
- Hound of the Baskervilles
- Making God Laugh
- Rumors
- Stories Under the Big Top
- The Lion King Jr.
- The Girl on the Train

2025 - 2026 Season

- Dirty Rotten Scoundrels
- Tartuffe
- 12 Angry Jurors
- Dracula, A Comedy of Terrors
- Doubt
- Angel Street
- Peter and the Starcatcher
- Hard Boiled: A Nursery Crime
- Rudolph, the Red-Nosed Reindeer: The Musical, Jr.
- Our Town
- Dorothy in Wonderland
- The Wizard of Oz, Jr.

2024 - 2025 Season

- The Mousetrap
- Young Frankenstein
- Misery
- Noises Off!
- Birthday Candles
- Outside Mullingar
- Night of the Living Dead
- Little Women
- Willy Wonka and the Chocolate Factory, Jr.
- The SpongeBob Musical

2023 - 2024 Season

- Dial M For Murder
- Witch
- A Funny Thing Happened On The Way to the Forum
- Pygmalion
- The Other Place
- The Laramie Project
- Murder on the Orient Express
- Mary Poppins, Jr.
- The Odd Couple: Female Version
- James and the Giant Peach

2022 - 2023

- Brighton Beach Memoirs
- The Spitfire Grill
- The Government Inspector
- The Father
- A Doll's House: Part Two
- Clue: Live on Stage
- Kodachrome
- Newsies, Jr.
- All In the Timing & Time Flies
- Suessical, Jr.

Past playbills can be found at the Chicago Public Library Theater Collection Archives.

== Non-profit status ==
The Theatre of Western Springs is a 501(c)3 not-for-profit organization.

== See Also ==
List of theatres in Chicago
