= Margie Gibson =

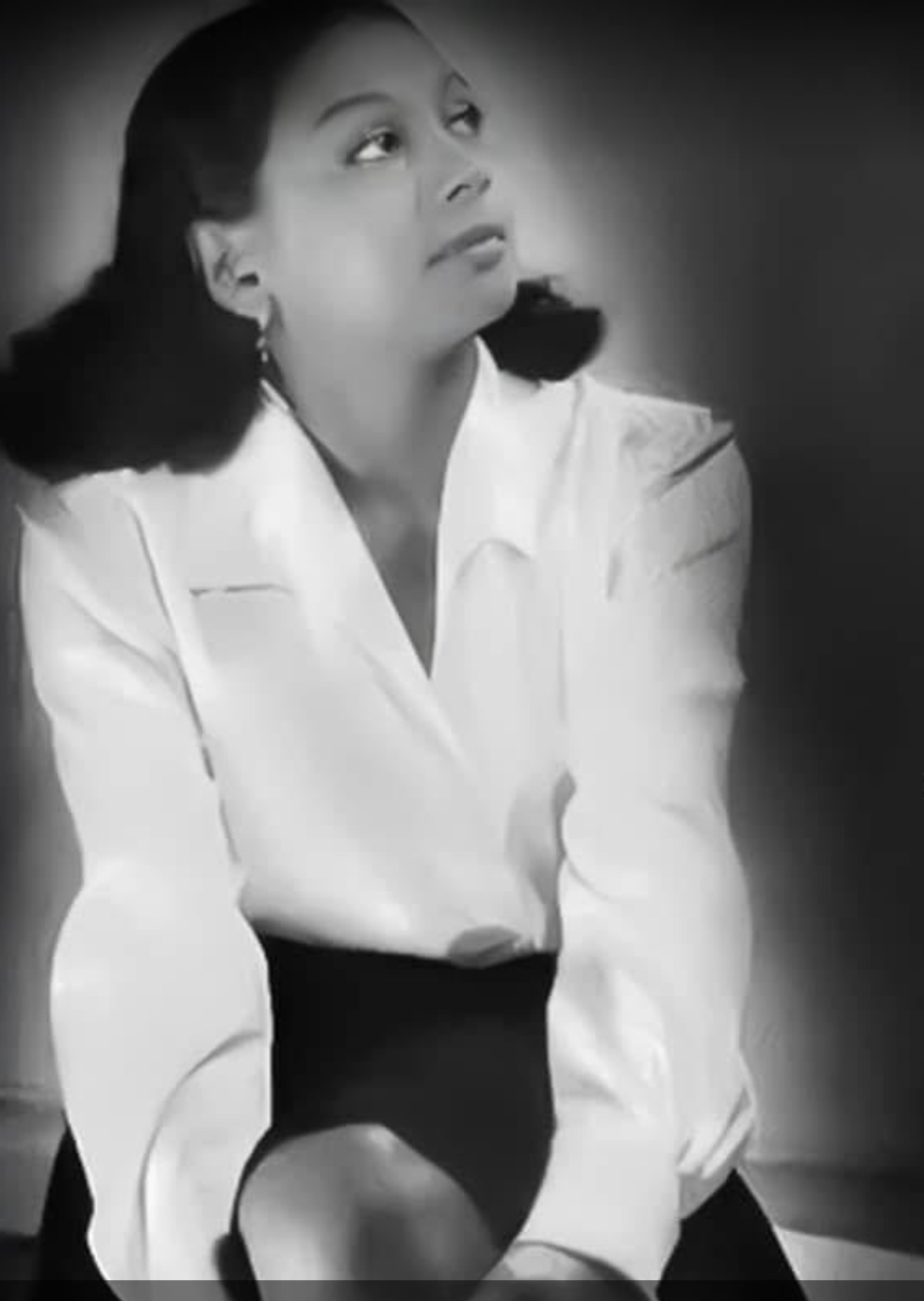
Gibson c. 1941

Margie Gibson (March 29, 1916 – December 9, 1990) was an American jazz composer and arranger of South Asian descent. Gibson broke the color line by having her music played and recorded by some of the leading white bands of the time. She was not primarily an instrumentalist and stayed largely behind the scenes.

== Early life and career ==
Margie Gibson was born in Baltimore, Maryland on March 29, 1916. She was the only child of Nathaniel and Mavis Gibson, a Hindu couple who had emigrated from Calcutta to the United States. Gibson's family moved to Asbury Park, New Jersey when she was quite young. She studied piano with Madeline Harris, who emphasized theory and harmony. In order to obtain a knowledge of instruments, Gibson bought an alto horn to facilitate her interest in orchestration. At the age of 18, she met her mentor, arranger/composer Bill Grey, with whom she remained remain closely associated for the rest of her short career.

== Career ==
In the mid-1930s, Gibson moved to New York to continue up her studies with Grey and supported herself by modeling for various organizations, including the New York Art League.

Her first major success as an arranger came in 1940, when she wrote two different big band versions of "It’s A Wonderful World", one for Coleman Hawkins and one for Harry James. Although never recorded commercially, broadcast recordings of both exist.

Gibson rose from obscurity to great fame based on her work in 1941. Her arrangements of pop songs and occasionally her own original pieces were recorded by four of the most popular names in the music business at the time. In January alone, these recordings of Gibson's work were made:

- With Harry James
  - "Music Makers"
  - "Answer Man"
- With Benny Goodman
  - "Let the Doorknob Hitcha"
- With Count Basie
  - "Beau Brummel"

More recordings were to follow through early 1942, including her original compositions "Take It" (recorded by Benny Goodman) and "Deuces Wild" (recorded by Artie Shaw). She also worked with Paul Whiteman, Ella Fitzgerald, and Jimmie Lunceford.

Gibson's music had a spare quality, akin to that of one of her inspirations, Jimmy Mundy.

=== War years and move to Chicago ===
Grey and Gibson moved to Chicago in late 1941, where they opened a record store, just one of the many anomalies in Gibson's career, given her great success in New York. They offered to supply arrangements to Army bands that had an interest in jazz to support the war effort.

Gibson spent a lot of time creating new music for the Bobby Byrne, Fletcher Henderson, and Boyd Raeburn bands throughout 1942.

== Later years, disappearance, and death ==
By 1945, Gibson was in Los Angeles, playing second piano and arranging for a band led by the obscure singer Bob Parrish. Very little is known about Gibson after 1945. After initial success with some of the best bands of the day playing and recording her music, Gibson disappeared from the major leagues of show business and has remained obscure, with the exception of a few mentions in jazz histories and liner notes. She is absent from The Grove Dictionary of Jazz, the music's main reference source, even though she wrote for Benny Goodman, Harry James, Artie Shaw, Coleman Hawkins, Jimmie Lunceford, Fletcher and Horace Henderson, and Boyd Raeburn.

She died on December 9, 1990, in Asbury Park, New Jersey.

== Legacy ==
Gunther Schuller's The Swing Era contains a summary of her work.
