= Black. Queer. Southern. Women. =

2018 non-fiction book by E. Patrick Johnson

Black. Queer. Southern. Women. An Oral History
- Author: E. Patrick Johnson
- Publisher: University of North Carolina Press
- Publication date: October 2018
- Publication place: United States
- Pages: 592
- ISBN: 978-1-4696-4111-9
- OCLC: 1057725887

Black. Queer. Southern. Women. An Oral History is a non-fiction book by E. Patrick Johnson. It was published in 2018 by the University of North Carolina Press.

== Background ==
Black. Queer. Southern. Women. (BQSW), like E. Patrick Johnson's previous book Sweet Tea : Black Gay Men of the South, was written to document Black queer oral history. To gather material for the book, Johnson conducted seventy-six interviews between August 2012 and September 2014. Thirty of those interviews took place during August and September 2012.

It was originally published electronically in October 2018, and released physically in November 2018.

== Summary ==
BQSW contains Johnson's account of seventy-six different interviews he conducted with women in the American South who felt same-sex desire. The collection is divided into two parts. The first half contains six chapters contain interviews organized by theme. The second half focuses on the interviews and stories of six individual women, including activist Mary Anne Adams.

== Reception ==
A review in QED: A Journal in GLBTQ Worldmaking praised Johnson for the way he navigated the situations in which he, as a man coming from a place of potential power, conducted interviews with lesbian and queer women, as well as the way he prioritized recording oral history as opposed to analyze it in search of an ultimate "truth". Ultimately, the reviewer described BQSW as an "important text" which provided "a well-rounded understanding of black queer women's experience in the South".

In Journal of Southern History, the reviewer, L.H. Stallings, was overall positive towards the book, saying that BQSW "provide[d] a welcome and necessary lens into how black women persevere and create the communities they need to live in the South". However, they also felt that the collection would have been stronger had it provided more stories from younger queer black women in the American South.
