= Dwight Conquergood =

Ethnographer

Lorne Dwight Conquergood (October 19, 1949 – November 13, 2004) was an ethnographer who is best known for his work with the Hmong of southeast Asia, street gangs of Chicago, and refugees in Thailand and Gaza.

== Background ==
Conquergood was born in Thunder Bay, Ontario to Daniel and Dorothea Conquergood. At age three he moved to Terre Haute, Indiana. He graduated from Indiana State University in 1972 with a bachelor of arts in speech communication and English. In 1974 he received his master's in communication from the University of Utah. In 1977 Conquergood received his Ph.D. in performance studies from Northwestern University. Conquergood then became an assistant professor of rhetoric and communication at the State University of New York in Binghamton. In 1978 he returned to Northwestern University to teach.

== Career ==
Throughout his career, Conquergood's work focused on those marginalized by society. In 1981 he began his work with Hmong refugees at Ban Vinai Refugee Camp in northeastern Thailand. Of special interest was the performative aspects of Hmong culture. His conversations with Hmong healer Paja Thao led to Conquergood’s widely circulated 1986 essay I Am a Shaman: A Hmong Life Story with Ethnographic Commentary. Conquergood also became involved with the International Rescue Committee in Thailand, using his knowledge of Hmong culture and folklore to help design a form of “health theater” to educate refugees about necessary sanitation in the camp. Back in Chicago, he helped new Hmong immigrants find housing and employment, and he served as their advocate in court cases and other dealings.

In the mid nineteen eighties Conquergood worked with Palestinian refugees at the Jabaliya camp on the Gaza Strip.

Later Conquergood relocated to the North Side Chicago neighborhood of Albany Park to conduct research in the community. "The 'Big Red' tenement Conquergood selected was located in an area known as 'Little Beirut,' rampant with gangs, graffiti, and civil disorder. He became an active member of the community, befriending and tutoring gang members while he studied their culture and daily life." This research led to his work Life in Big Red: Struggles and Accommodations in a Chicago Polyethnic Tenement. While living and working in Albany Park, Conquergood began to develop a relationship with the Latin Kings street gang. This relationship allowed him to study gang life in Chicago that led to a complex understanding of street life.

Later in life, Conquergood began researching the purpose, rituals and societal implications of the death penalty in America. His 2002 paper, "Lethal Theatre: Performance, Punishment, and the Death Penalty", was published in Theatre Journal, a publication of the Johns Hopkins University Press. It argued that the criminological function of capital punishment could not be assessed without the inclusion of its performance aspects as a “theater of death.”

Conquergood died on November 13, 2004, of colon cancer.

== Books ==
- I Am a Shaman: A Hmong Life Story with Ethnographic Commentary (1989), Center for Urban and Regional Affairs 1989 paperback ASIN: B001R2G65S

== Films ==
- The Heart Broken in Half (1991), Collective Eye, Inc. 2008 DVD
- Between Two Worlds: The Hmong Shaman in America (1985), directed by Taggart Siegel, produced by Taggart Siegel and Dwight Conquergood.
- Dwight Conquergood speaking at Globalizing the Streets Conference (2001)

== Achievements ==
- Indiana State University - Distinguished Alumni Award (1997)
- Council for the Advancement and Support of Education - Illinois Professor of the Year (1993)
- Speech Communication Association - Lilla Heston Award for Distinguished Scholarship in Performance Studies
- Chicago International Film Festival - Certificate of Merit
- Chicago International Film Festival - Silver Plaque Award (1985)
