= First Folio Theatre =

American theater company (1996–2023)

Coordinates: 41.802484°N 87.953491°W

First Folio Theatre was a not-for-profit theater company affiliated with the Actors' Equity Association. Founded in 1996, First Folio, originally named First Folio Shakespeare Festival, was located on the grounds of the Mayslake Peabody Estate in Oak Brook, Illinois, United States. First Folio utilized the "Folio Method" as developed by Patrick Tucker (at one time of the Royal Shakespeare Company), who first introduced his approach to American actors, directors and teachers in a series of workshops sponsored by the Riverside Shakespeare Company of New York City at The Shakespeare Center beginning in 1982, which led to an awakened interest in the First Folio.

The Folio Method employs the text of William Shakespeare's First Folio to illuminate the textual clues for the actors and the audience.

First Folio Theatre was listed as a Major Festival in the book Shakespeare Festivals Around the World by Marcus D. Gregio (Editor), 2004.

After 25 years in operation, First Folio Theatre ceased operations with its last performance in February 2023, due to the retirement of its Founding Executive Director David Rice. https://firstfolio.org/26th-season-preview/

== Performance venues ==
First Folio Theatre performed in the Event Hall of the historic Mayslake Peabody Estate. Its first venue was its outdoor stage, built in 1997 and located adjacent to the beautiful Portiuncula Chapel. Lawn seating allowed up to 500 audience members to enjoy a picnic while they watched Shakespeare-under-the-stars. The second venue was First Folio's chamber theater, opened in 2004 and located in the formal library of Mayslake Hall. With seating for 80, this venue was used for more intimate productions. The third venue was the Event Hall, opened in 2008 and located in the Retreat Wing of Mayslake Hall. This venue seated up to 130 and was First Folio's primary indoor venue through 2023.

== Educational outreach ==
Along with their formal stagings, First Folio's Educational Outreach program also offered four educational touring shows and an artist-in-residence program. The four touring shows included Master Shakespeare and His Stories, designed for grade-school aged children; Shakespeare's Warring and Wooing, The Fifty Minute Midsummer Night's Dream, and Edgar Allan Poe and the Tell-Tale Heart, all geared toward middle and high school students. First Folio gave over 250 performances of their touring shows for over 125,000 students throughout Illinois and Iowa. These programs were included in the Illinois Arts Council's Arts Tour Roster. First Folio's outreach program was chosen as the Artists-in-Residence for the Quad Cities Arts Program in November 2006.

== Past performances ==
=== 1997 ===
- The Tempest

=== 1998 ===
- A Midsummer Night's Dream

=== 1999 ===
- The Taming of the Shrew

=== 2000 ===
- Romeo and Juliet
- Much Ado About Nothing

=== 2001 ===
- Macbeth
- As You Like It

=== 2002 ===
- Antigone
- Twelfth Night

=== 2003 ===
- The Comedy of Errors

=== 2004 ===
- Hamlet
- A Midsummer Night's Dream

=== 2005 ===
- The Importance of Being Earnest
- The Taming of the Shrew
- A Connecticut Yankee in King Arthur's Court

=== 2006 ===
- Private Lives
- The Tempest
- The Madness of Edgar Allan Poe: A Love Story

=== 2007 ===
- Angel Street
- Richard III
- The Madness of Edgar Allan Poe: A Love Story

=== 2008 ===
- Jeeves Intervenes
- Driving Miss Daisy
- Much Ado About Nothing

=== 2009 ===
- Design for Living
- A Moon for the Misbegotten
- Macbeth
- The Castle of Otranto

=== 2010 ===
- Jeeves in Bloom
- Will Rogers: An American Original
- Twelfth Night
- The Madness of Edgar Allan Poe

=== 2011 ===
- Blithe Spirit
- The Woman in Black
- Romeo and Juliet
- Tea at Five

=== 2012 ===
- Unnecessary Farce
- The Turn of the Screw
- The Merchant of Venice
- Shylock and His Daughter
- The Madness of Edgar Allan Poe

=== 2013 ===
- Jeeves Takes a Bow
- Underneath the Lintel
- Cymbeline: A Musical Folktale
- The Rainmaker

=== 2014 ===
- Rough Crossing
- Salvage
- The Merry Wives of Windsor
- The Gravedigger

=== 2015 ===
- Laughter on the 23rd Floor
- Love, Loss, and What I Wore
- The Winter's Tale
- The Madness of Edgar Allan Poe

=== 2022–2023 season ===
- Jeeves Intervenes
- Louisa May Alcott's Little Women
- And Neither Have I Wings to Fly
- Twelfth Night (canceled)
