= Emil J. Boucek =

American politician

Emil J. Boucek (April 20, 1917 – March 3, 2005) was an American politician.

Born in Chicago, Illinois, Boucek served as a constable and as a bailiff for Cook County, Illinois. He also served as a village clerk for Brookfield, Illinois. He lived in Western Springs, Illinois. Boucek served in the Illinois House of Representatives from 1977 to 1983 and was a Republican. He died from pancreatic cancer at his home in Willowbrook, Illinois.

His great nephew Timothy Boucek resides in Batavia, Illinois.
