= Western Springs, Illinois =

Village in Illinois, United States

- Village
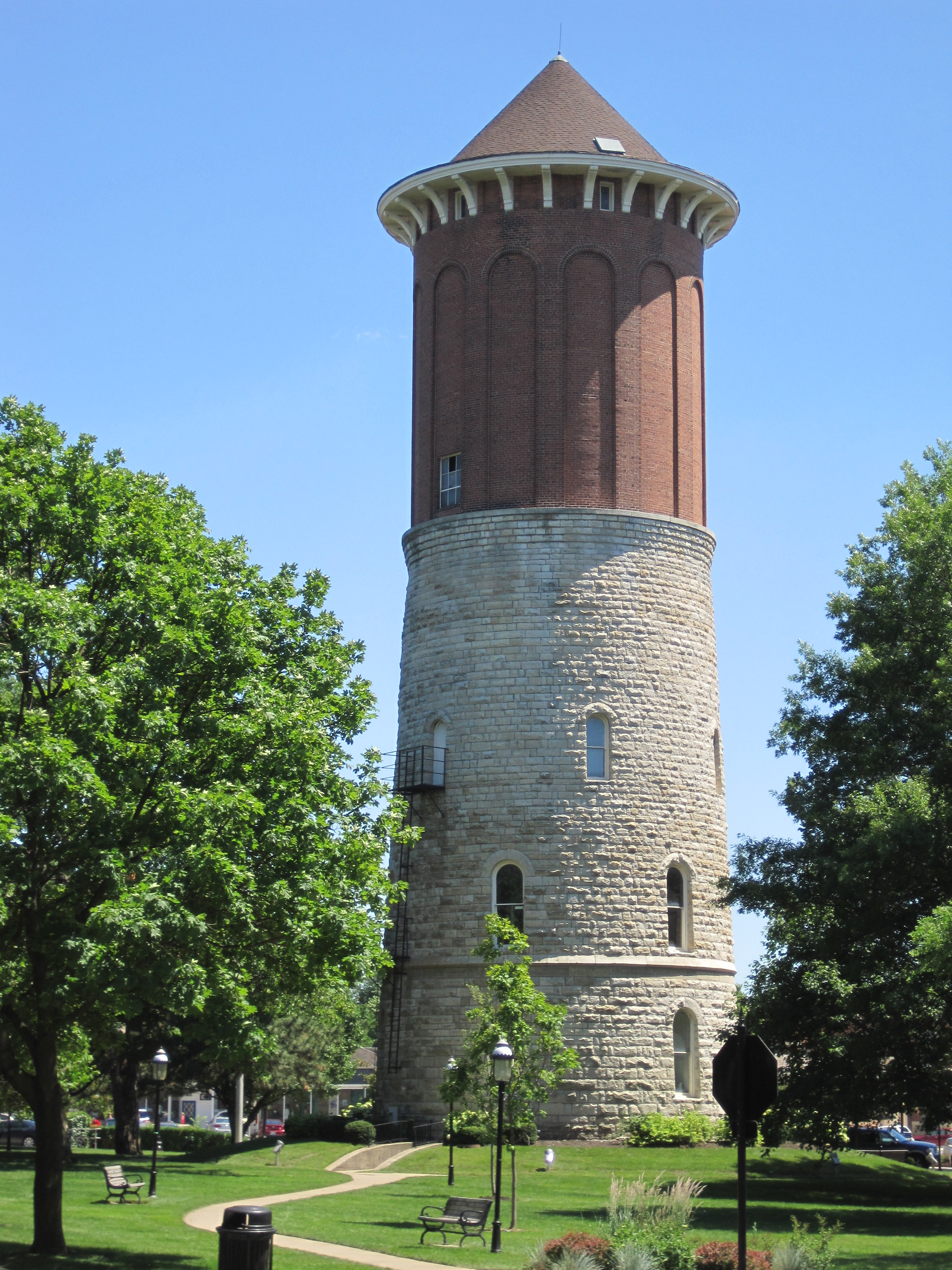
- Western Springs Water Tower

- logo
- Motto: A Village of Towering Character
- Location of Western Springs in Cook County, Illinois

- Location within Greater Chicago Location within Illinois Location within the United States
- Coordinates: 41°48′20″N 87°54′04″W
- Country: United States
- State: Illinois
- County: Cook
- Township: Lyons Township
- Founded: 1886

Government
  - Village President: Heidi Rudolph

Area
  - Total: 2.78 sq mi (7.21 km^{2})
  - Land: 2.78 sq mi (7.21 km^{2})
  - Water: 0 sq mi (0.00 km^{2})

Population (2020)
  - Total: 13,629
  - Density: 4,894.6/sq mi (1,889.81/km^{2})
- Time zone: UTC-6 (CST)
  - Summer (DST): UTC-5 (CDT)
- ZIP Code(s): 60558
- Area code: 708
- FIPS code: 17-80242
- Wikimedia Commons: Western Springs, Illinois
- Website: www.wsprings.com

Western Springs is a village in Cook County, Illinois, United States, and a suburb of Chicago. As of the 2020 census, the village had a total population of 13,629.

Named for local mineral springs on the southwest side of town, Western Springs originally consisted of flat prairie land with a swamp on its western border. It is located along the BNSF Railway (formerly the Chicago, Burlington & Quincy Railroad) between Chicago and Aurora, encompassing roughly the area between Willow Springs Road (Gilbert Avenue), Ogden Avenue, Interstate 294, and West Plainfield Road.

== History ==
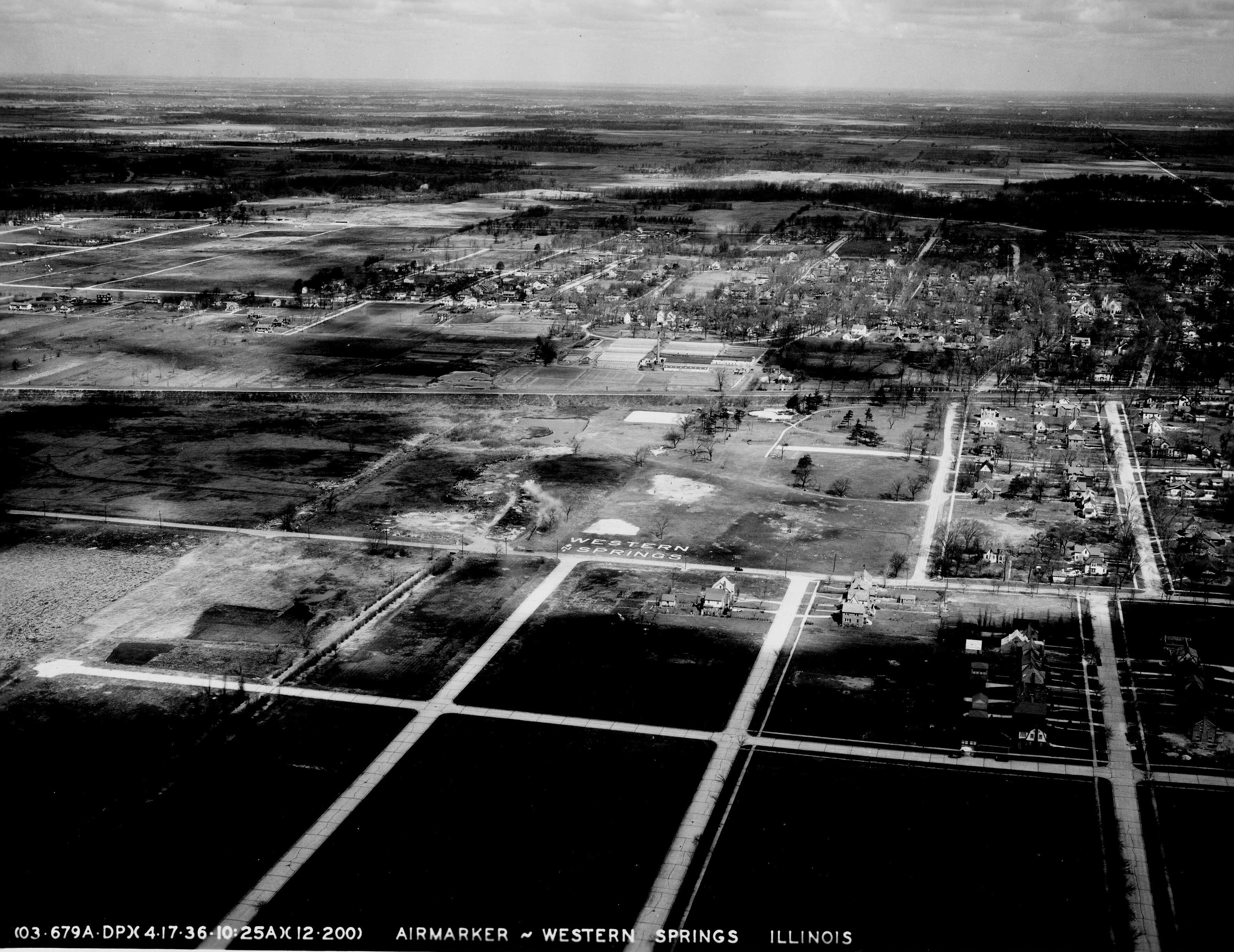
Western Springs in 1936

Around the turn of the 18th century, nomadic Potawatomi Native Americans settled in the Western Springs area. Whether they built a village is unclear, but evidence of temporary campsites has been found near Flagg Creek in Forest Hills. The natives were gone by the end of 1835, but Potawatomi artifacts may still be found buried in the Springdale neighborhood. The last Cook County campground of the Potawatomi was within what is now the Timber Trails subdivision.

The first known settler in the area near Western Springs was Elijah Wentworth. By 1834, after the Black Hawk War, farmer Joseph Vial had moved from New York and built a cabin along what is now Plainfield Road, a former Native American trail in the south of Western Springs. This cabin served as a stagecoach station, hotel, general store, and post office for the entire area.

The CB&Q Railroad built a line through Western Springs in 1863, filling in much of the westside swamp in the process. In 1870, the Western Springs Land Association, consisting of promoter Thomas Clarkson Hill, William Page and two sons of Phillip F. W. Peck, bought the three tracts that make up the area for $105,000. In 1872, Hill moved to the area from Chicago, and the community began organizing to attract more commuters. Residents built a wooden schoolhouse (1872) and a post office (1873).

In 1885, the Grand Avenue School replaced the wooden schoolhouse, and the office of village marshal was created as a combination policeman, dogcatcher, and groundskeeper. In 1886, the Friend's Church (razed in 1958) was built on the corner of Walnut and Woodland. That same year, Western Springs incorporated as a village by a public vote of 34 to 25. The voting townspeople elected a prominent Quaker developer, T. C. Hill, as the town's first president.

A large number of early residents were Quakers, and deeds often prohibited the sale of alcohol. (Until recently, the village itself had not permitted the sale of alcoholic beverages but currently a number of establishments do sell such.) Over time, with increased commuter settlement, Western Springs came to look less and less Quaker.

After the spring dried up in 1890, the village hired engineers Edgar and Benezette Williams to build the village waterworks system, including the famous Western Springs Water Tower. Constructed using Naperville stone, the tower stands 112 feet (34 m) high. A new water tower was constructed in 1962 in Spring Rock Park, replacing the iconic water tower as the village's water source. The tower became a museum in 1970 and entered the National Register of Historic Places in 1981. A fire in 1991 from a lightning strike caused extensive damage to the roof and interior, but the museum reopened in 1993 following restoration efforts The water tower is seen by residents as a symbol of the town.

Western Springs added many improvements over the years, including a fire department (1894), electric plant (1898), telephones (1899), a park district (1923), and a library (1926). The village expanded south of 47th Street, annexing the subdivisions of Forest Hills (1927), Springdale (1955), and Ridgewood (1973).

On July 26, 1962, one of the first international satellite calls, using the new Telstar satellite, was placed between representatives of Western Springs and its sister city Rugeley, England.

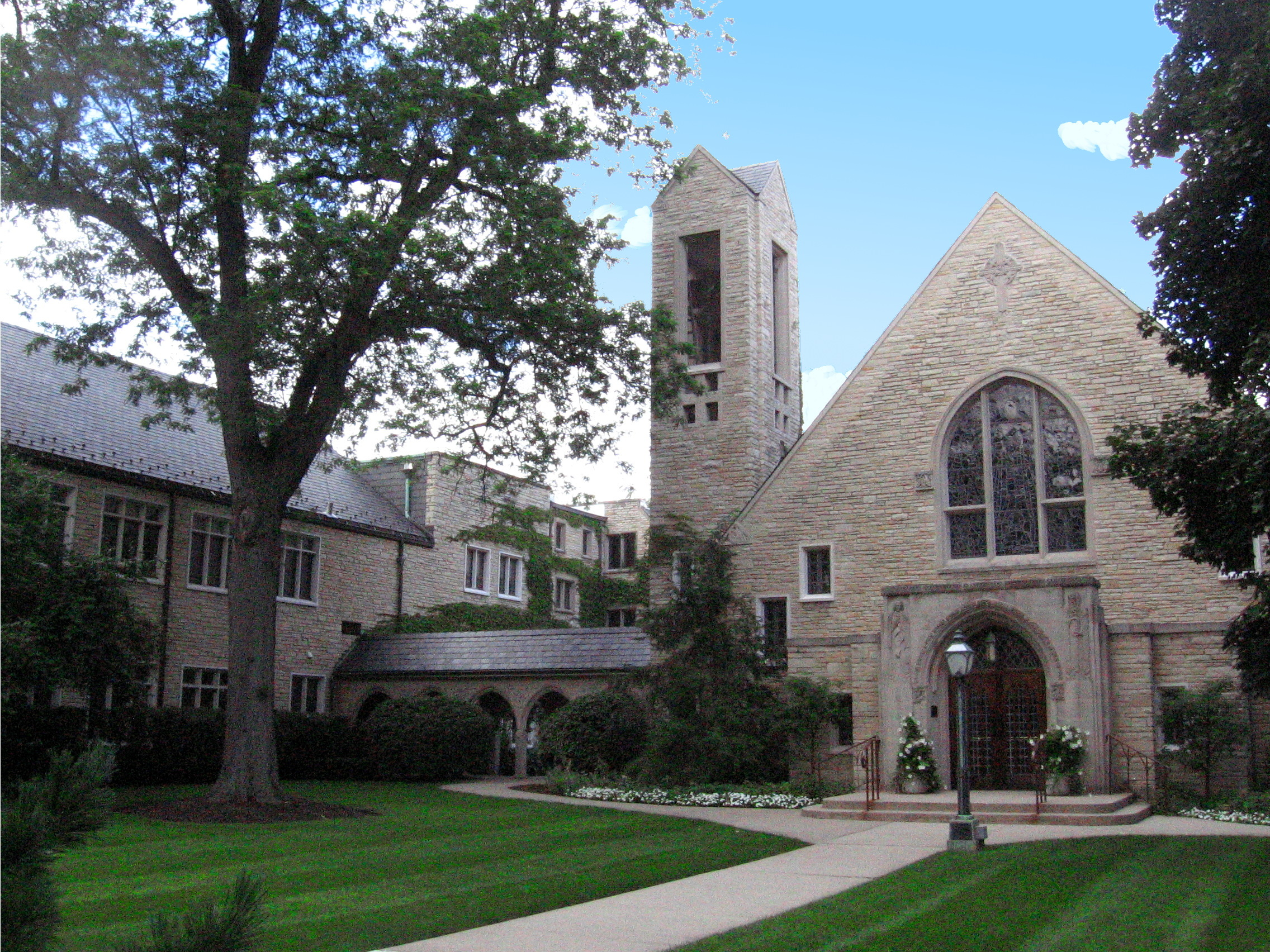
The First Congregational Church of Western Springs is listed on the National Register of Historic Places.

On March 21, 2005, the Village of Western Springs annexed the former Timber Trails golf course, which is now being developed into a new community of single-family homes and townhomes. The annexation of the property added 105.9 acres (0.429 km^{2}) to the village. The plans for this development were controversial, with some residents citing concerns over the number of trees to be cut down and fears about possible environmental contamination due to pesticides from the former golf course as reasons for their opposition to the development.

== Geography ==
Western Springs is located at 41°48'20" North, 87°54'4" West (41.805531, -87.901035).

Western Springs is located 15 miles (24 km) west of the Chicago Loop and encompasses roughly the area between Willow Springs Road, Ogden Avenue, Interstate 294, and Plainfield Road.

According to the 2010 census, Western Springs has a total area of 2.79 square miles (7.23 km^{2}), all land.

== Demographics ==
Historical population
| Census | Pop. | Note | %± |
|---|---|---|---|
| 1880 | 172 | | — |
| 1890 | 451 | | 162.2% |
| 1900 | 662 | | 46.8% |
| 1910 | 905 | | 36.7% |
| 1920 | 1,258 | | 39.0% |
| 1930 | 3,894 | | 209.5% |
| 1940 | 4,856 | | 24.7% |
| 1950 | 6,364 | | 31.1% |
| 1960 | 10,838 | | 70.3% |
| 1970 | 13,029 | | 20.2% |
| 1980 | 12,876 | | −1.2% |
| 1990 | 11,984 | | −6.9% |
| 2000 | 12,493 | | 4.2% |
| 2010 | 12,975 | | 3.9% |
| 2020 | 13,629 | | 5.0% |
U.S. Decennial Census

=== Racial and ethnic composition ===
Western Springs village, Illinois – Racial and ethnic composition Note: the US Census treats Hispanic/Latino as an ethnic category. This table excludes Latinos from the racial categories and assigns them to a separate category. Hispanics/Latinos may be of any race.
| Race / Ethnicity (NH = Non-Hispanic) | Pop 2000 | Pop 2010 | Pop 2020 | % 2000 | % 2010 | % 2020 |
|---|---|---|---|---|---|---|
| White alone (NH) | 12,118 | 12,294 | 12,309 | 97.00% | 94.75% | 90.31% |
| Black or African American alone (NH) | 23 | 43 | 57 | 0.18% | 0.33% | 0.42% |
| Native American or Alaska Native alone (NH) | 4 | 5 | 3 | 0.03% | 0.04% | 0.02% |
| Asian alone (NH) | 90 | 179 | 246 | 0.72% | 1.38% | 1.80% |
| Native Hawaiian or Pacific Islander alone (NH) | 0 | 1 | 1 | 0.00% | 0.01% | 0.01% |
| Other race alone (NH) | 3 | 9 | 27 | 0.02% | 0.07% | 0.20% |
| Mixed race or Multiracial (NH) | 43 | 83 | 362 | 0.34% | 0.64% | 2.66% |
| Hispanic or Latino (any race) | 212 | 361 | 624 | 1.70% | 2.78% | 4.58% |
| Total | 12,493 | 12,975 | 13,629 | 100.00% | 100.00% | 100.00% |

=== 2020 census ===
As of the 2020 census, there were 13,629 people in the village. There were 3,844 families residing in the village. The population density was 4,894 inhabitants per square mile (1,890/km^{2}).

The median age was 41.1 years. 29.4% of residents were under the age of 18 and 15.8% of residents were 65 years of age or older. For every 100 females, there were 96.9 males, and for every 100 females age 18 and over, there were 93.0 males age 18 and over.

100.0% of residents lived in urban areas, while 0.0% lived in rural areas.

There were 4,538 households in Western Springs, of which 43.9% had children under the age of 18 living in them. Of all households, 74.2% were married-couple households, 7.3% were households with a male householder and no spouse or partner present, and 17.0% were households with a female householder and no spouse or partner present. About 15.7% of all households were made up of individuals and 10.2% had someone living alone who was 65 years of age or older.

There were 4,726 housing units, of which 4.0% were vacant. The homeowner vacancy rate was 1.8% and the rental vacancy rate was 6.0%. The housing unit density was 1,697 per square mile (655/km^{2}).

=== Income and poverty ===
The median income for a household in the village was $184,412, and the median income for a family was $194,731. Males had a median income of $122,670 versus $51,733 for females. The per capita income for the village was $80,877. About 1.8% of families and 3.0% of the population were below the poverty line, including 3.0% of those under age 18 and 1.1% of those age 65 or over.

== Parks and recreation ==
The Western Springs Service Club (WSSC) is Western Springs' private pool. The pool was formed in 1954 and officially opened in 1955. There was an addition made in 1965 and a renovation in 1996. The WSSC provides recreational swimming, swim team for ages 6 to 18, water aerobics, lap swimming, and swim lessons for members of the Service Club. On top of the infant pool, two swimming pools with slides and a diving board, the WSSC also includes a grass volleyball court and a GaGa pit. The facility also provides an outdoor snack shop and locker rooms. The property may also be used for birthday parties, relaxation, picnics, or meetings.

Western Springs has a public library, the Thomas Ford Memorial Library. The library building at 800 Chestnut St. opened in 1932. Additions to the building were completed in 1962 and 1996. The library serves both children and adults and is part of the suburban library system. Patrons have access to programs such as story hour, book groups, and film groups.

The Theatre of Western Springs has been present in the community since 1929. It features main stage productions, a children's theatre and a high school repertory, as well as a performance series, summer camp opportunities and workshops.

Western Springs includes two recreational centers. The Recreation Center and the Grand Avenue Community Center are both about four blocks from downtown Western Springs. These recreation centers provide many classes, sports, events, and activities for anyone who desires to be active.

=== List of parks ===
- Ridge Acres Park
- Ridgewood Park
- Laidlaw Park
- Spring Rock Park (1931)
- Springdale Park
- Forest Hills Park
- Clark Park
- Northeast Park (previously known as "Candy Cane Park")
- Field Park
- Timber Trails Park (2005)
- Sereda Park

== Government ==
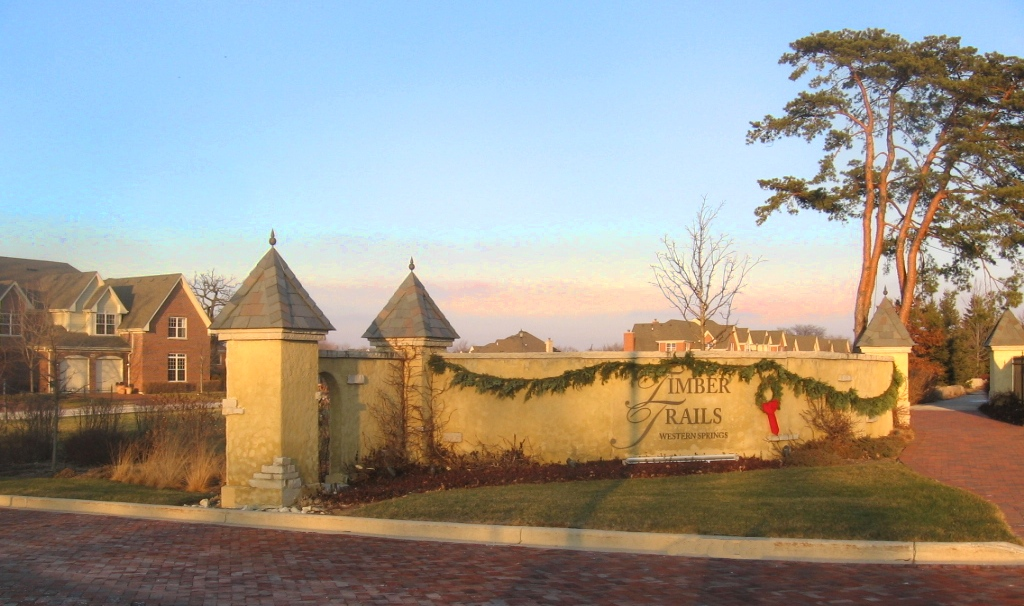
The western entrance of the Timber Trails subdivision

Western Springs' village president is Alice Gallagher (2017). It is currently in Illinois's 6th congressional district, per the post-2020 census redistricting. Before 2020, it was part of Illinois's 3rd congressional district. The 3rd district's former congressman, Dan Lipinski, is a resident of the village. His father, Bill Lipinski, was a longtime congressman of the 3rd district, and was able to get his son to replace him on the ballot, though he had not lived in Illinois for 15 years. Marie Newman defeated Lipinski in 2020, but, due to statewide redistricting, was forced in the 2022 Democratic primary to compete with neighboring incumbent Sean Casten. On June 28, 2022, Newman lost the primary to Casten.

== Education ==
The Village of Western Springs is served by three public elementary school districts and one public high school district.

Western Springs School District 101 serves the original neighborhoods of Western Springs and operates four schools: Field Park, Forest Hills, and Laidlaw Elementary Schools serve K-5 students, and McClure Junior High serves students in grades 6–8. LaGrange Highlands School District 106 serves students from other, newer neighborhoods (e.g., Ridgewood) and operates two schools: La Grange Highlands Elementary, which serves K-4 students, and La Grange Highlands Middle School for students in grades 5–8.

All elementary and middle schools that serve Western Springs feed into Lyons Township High School District 204. Lyons Township High School has two campuses: Freshmen and Sophomores attend the South Campus in Western Springs, and Juniors and Seniors attend the North Campus in LaGrange.

== Transportation ==
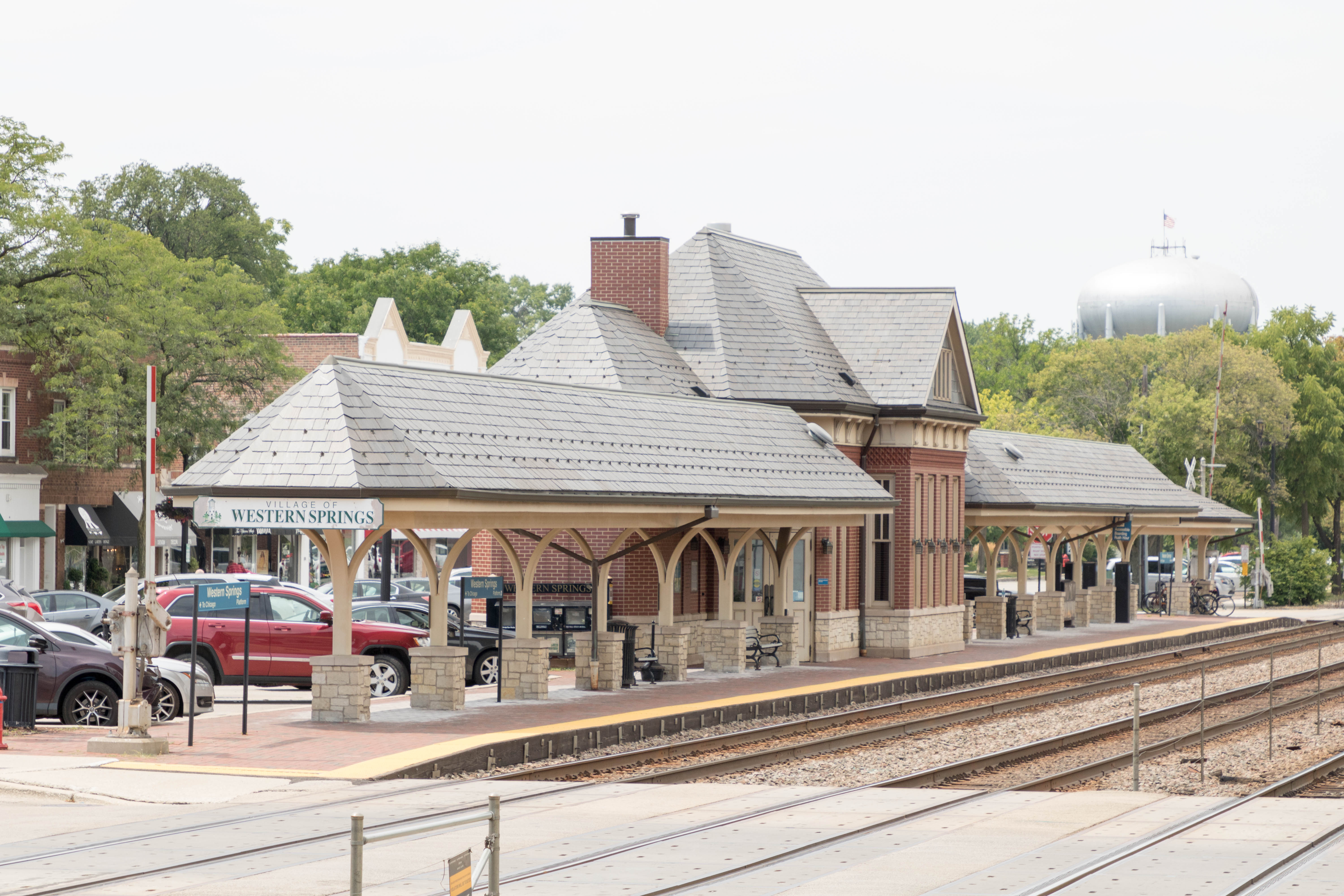
Western Springs station

One major highway traverses Western Springs; Ogden Avenue (U.S. Route 34) runs east–west along the northern border and intersects the Tri-State Tollway (I-294) on the western border. The main north–south street in the village is Wolf Road, designated as a Blue Star Memorial Highway.

The BNSF Railway runs through Western Springs. Daily commuter service on that line, connecting Aurora and Chicago, is provided by Metra. Freight rail traffic on the line is heavy, with BNSF operating freight trains on all three mainline routes through the village. During non-rush hours, a freight train may run along the line as frequently as once every 10 minutes on average. Amtrak also runs this line with passenger trains including the Southwest Chief, California Zephyr, and the Illinois Zephyr. All told, the BNSF and Amtrak run up to 130 trains a day through Western Springs: Eight Amtrak trains in both directions, 96 Metra trains from morning to midnight, and around 25 or more freight trains. Sometimes, around 145 trains can come through. A typical BNSF train contains 100 to 125 cars, mainly consisting of coal cars and intermodal trains. Metra runs five to 11 cars per train, with the average being six cars.

A new train station was built in 2004–2005. The north platform was remodeled in 2008, and the extended platform was connected to Wolf Road in 2019. The new station is a virtual replica of a train station that was demolished in 1972. Passenger airline service is available at O'Hare and Midway airports, both located in Chicago. Commuter bus service is provided by Pace, the suburban bus division of the Regional Transportation Authority.

== Notable people ==
- Robert Barron — Roman Catholic bishop
- Emil J. Boucek — state representative
- Brian Campbell — former defenseman for NHL's Chicago Blackhawks
- Terrel E. Clarke — Illinois state legislator and businessman
- Jack Collom — poet and teacher
- Melinda Culea — actress
- Steve Dahl — radio personality, podcaster
- Taylor Davis — violinist
- Jim Durkin — Minority Leader of the Illinois House of Representatives
- Jake Elliott — NFL kicker
- Cameron Esposito — comedian
- Jonathan Franzen — novelist
- Eileen Lyons — state representative
- John Hattendorf — maritime historian
- John Kass — columnist for Chicago Tribune
- Dan Lipinski — United States congressman
- Walter M. Urbain — food scientist
- James "J.Y." Young — guitarist for Styx
- Jane Wodening - artist and writer
- Suzy Glowiak — state senator from the 24th State Senate District

== Twin town ==
Western Springs is twinned with Rugeley, England.
