= Jackie Taylor (actress) =

American actress

- Born: August 10, 1951 (age 75); Chicago, Illinois, U.S.
- Occupations: Actress, Playwright, Director, Theater producer

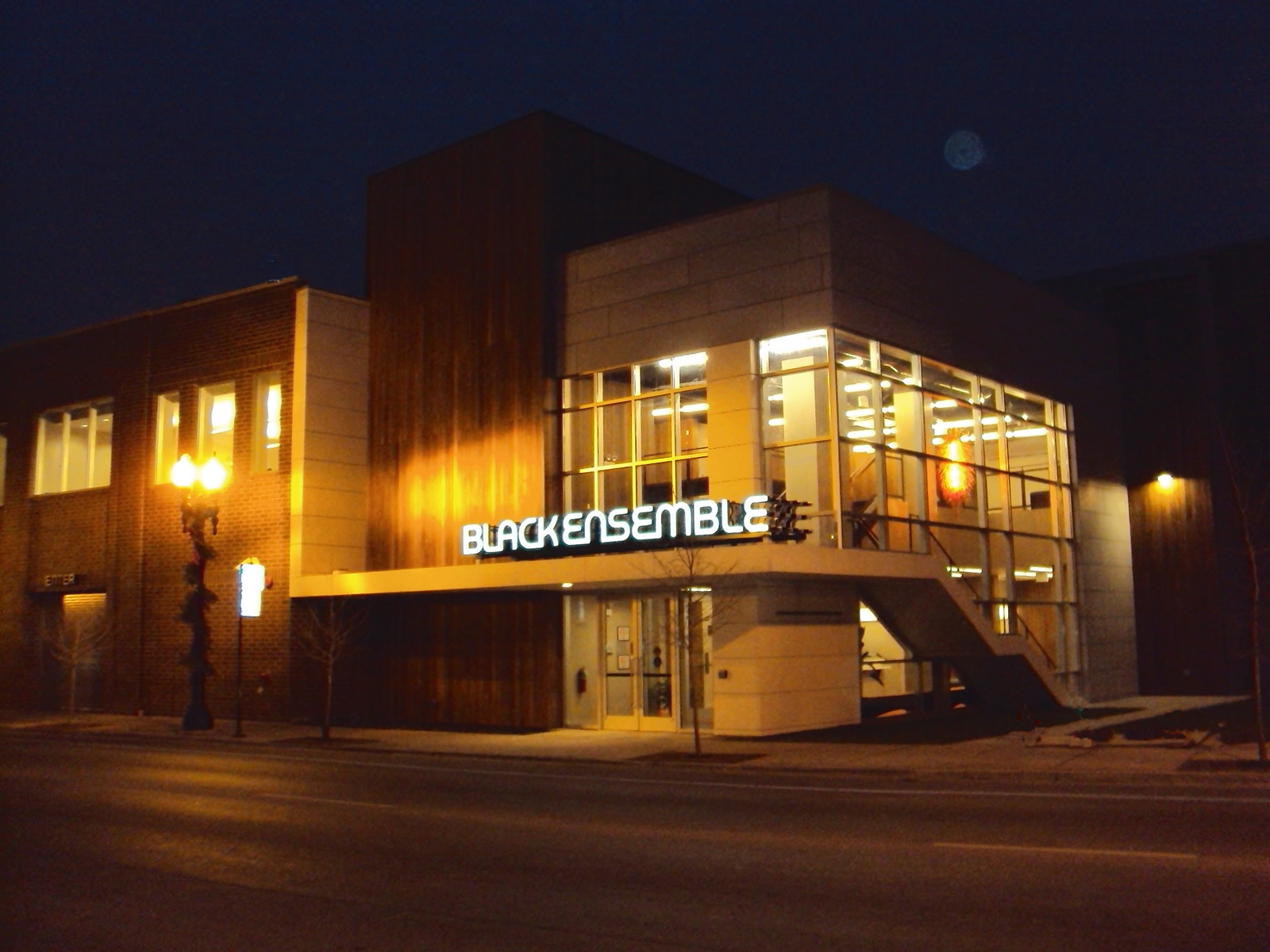
Taylor's "Black Ensemble Theater" pictured in 2011

Jacqueline Taylor (born August 10, 1951) is an American actress, playwright, director, and theater producer. She is the founder and CEO of the Black Ensemble Theater in Chicago.

Taylor has acted in several films, most notably Cooley High (1975). In 1976, she opened the Black Ensemble Theater, whose mission is to “eradicate racism and its damaging effects on our society through the utilization of theater arts and community engagement.” She is the president of the African American Arts Alliance.

Taylor has been given the lifetime achievement award by the League of Chicago Theaters, and Actors' Equity's Rosetta LeNoire Award for "outstanding artistic contributions to the universality of the human experience in American Theater".

== Early life and education ==
Jackie Taylor was born to parents Gus L. Taylor and Lucile (Ward) Taylor on August 10, 1951; she is the second youngest of her seven siblings. She grew up alongside her siblings in the Cabrini-Green housing projects. The conditions of Cabrini-Green coupled with Jackie's relationship with her mother made her upbringing turbulent. Taylor took interest in theater and story-telling from a young age; as a toddler she would make up stories and act them out in her closet. She started writing plays, poetry, and stories by age 8, and by the time she was in 7th grade, she had started directing plays. She attended St. Joseph School for grade school, then attended St. Michael Central High School. In high school, she was class president, a cheerleader, and a member of the honor society.

Taylor attended Loyola University right out of high school. At Loyola, Taylor would meet Dennis Zacek, one of the founding members of Victory Gardens Theater. By her senior year, Taylor was cast by Free Street Theater, a touring theater company. Also during her later years in college, she met her ex-husband Phil Wright.

== Career ==
As a senior at Loyola University, Taylor began working for Free Street Theater. Free Street was one of the first mixed race theater troupes. She performed with Free Street for two years, until she went to Goodman Theater, another theater that displayed productions with both black and white actors. From 1974 to 1980, Taylor performed for Victory Gardens, an all-black theater troupe. In 1975, Taylor made her Hollywood debut in the 1975 film, Cooley High. The film is highly regarded for its resistance of Hollywood's blaxploitation era, in which it was released. NPR called Cooley High, "a classic of black cinema".

Taylor started to become frustrated with the roles she was being offered, stating that they were often exploitative and stereotypical. Departing from Hollywood, she returned to Chicago to form the Black Ensemble Theater, seeking to build a place that "controlled images that were portrayed and told the truth about who we are as African Americans and not perpetuate the negativity that this society has built its wealth on for the past four hundred years.”

In 1976, Taylor founded the Black Ensemble Theater. The theater started in a community center basement in Chicago's Uptown neighborhood. At the Theater, Taylor and her team have put on over 100 shows. Some of the Black Ensembles most notable productions include "The Other Cinderella" (1976), "Muddy Waters and the Hoochie Coochie Man" (1985), "A Streetcar named Desire" (1986), "The Story of Otis Redding (1987), "Wang Dang Doodle" (1998), and "Elvis Presley was a Black Man" (1999).

In 2011, the Black Ensemble Theater unveiled its first permanent brick-and-mortar location in Uptown. Taylor remains CEO of the Black Ensemble Theater. She leads summer programs in the theater through her program Strengthening the School through Theater Arts, bringing theater education to schools around the Chicago area.

== Accolades and achievements ==
Taylor has been given the lifetime achievement award by the League of Chicago Theaters, and Actors' Equity's Rosetta LeNoire Award for "outstanding artistic contributions to the universality of the human experience in American Theater". In 2009, Governor Pat Quinn declared March 27, 2009 Jackie Taylor Day in Illinois. Taylor was named a Chicagoan of the Year by the Chicago Magazine in 2011. "Beacon Street" in Chicago's north side has been honorarily named "Jackie Taylor Street". New City Stage Magazine listed Taylor as one of 50 "People Who Really Perform in Chicago".

== Personal life ==
Taylor married Phil Wright while she was in college and together they had one daughter.
