= Western Springs Water Tower =

- U.S. National Register of Historic Places
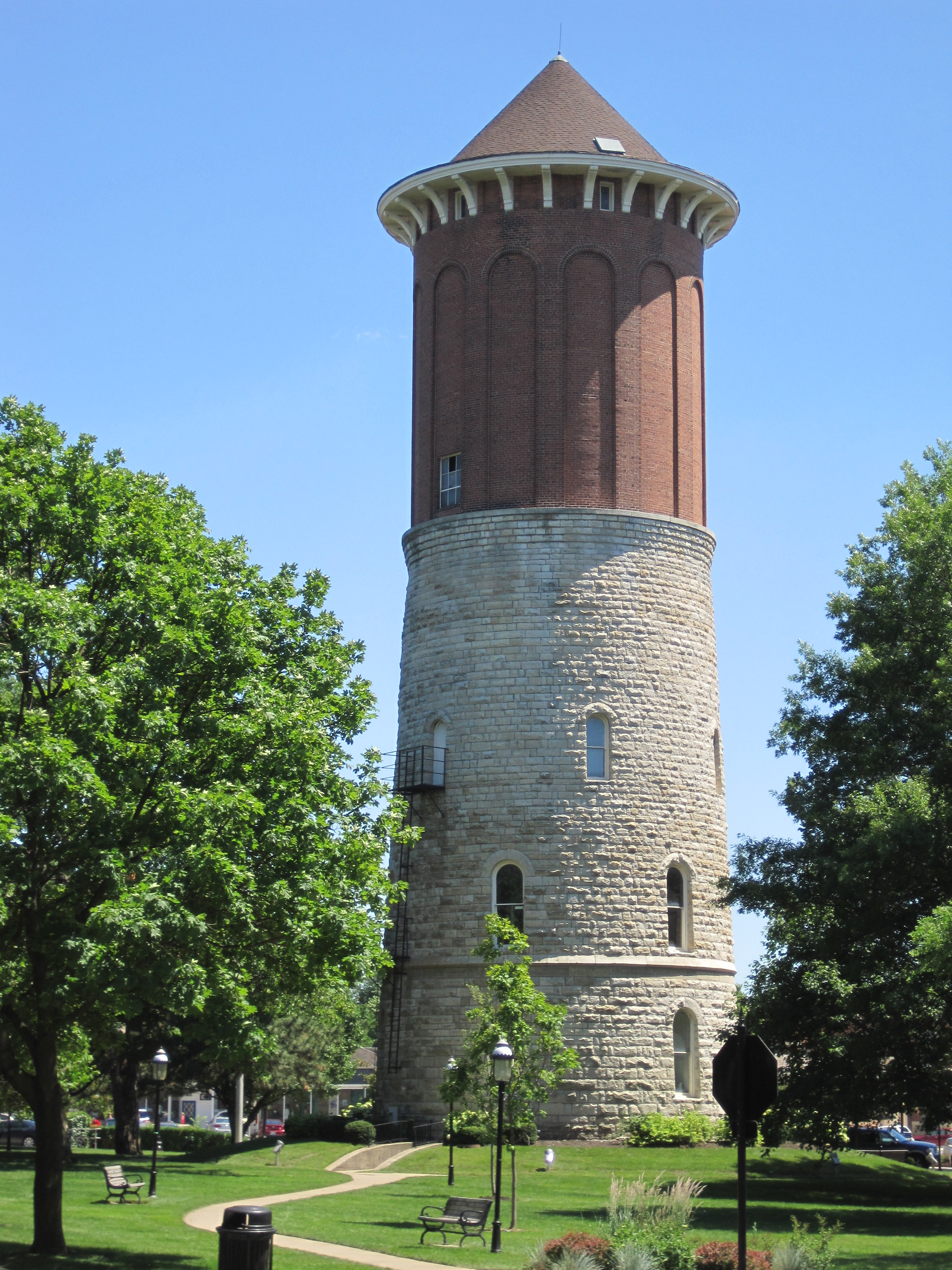

- Location within Illinois Location within the United States
- Location: 914 Hillgrove Ave., Western Springs, Illinois
- Coordinates: 41°48′35″N 87°54′3″W
- Built: 1892
- Architect: Benezette and Edgar Williams, Ethan Philbrick
- NRHP reference No.: 81000219
- Added to NRHP: June 04, 1981

The Western Springs Water Tower is a museum and former water tower in Western Springs, Illinois. The water tower is considered a symbol of Western Springs by residents, and multiple businesses and local organizations have taken their names from the tower. It was added to the National Register of Historic Places on June 4, 1981.

== History ==
Population growth in Western Springs during the late 19th century caused the natural springs after which the town was named to dry up. With the loss of this water source, it became clear that a new waterworks system was needed to support the growing population. The village hired brothers Benezette and Edgar Williams as well as Ethan Philbrick, all civil engineers residing in Western Springs, to design a new waterworks system.

Western Springs Water Tower was constructed as part of this system in 1892 on a triangular plot of land, donated Collins family, known as "Block A" (now Tower Green). The entire system was built at a cost of $79,119, a considerable sum at the time. 156 carloads of Naperville limestone were used in the construction and hand cut on site. Thousands of red bricks were used for the upper portion of the tower.

The tower was the village's water storage until a new water tower was constructed in 1962 in Spring Rock Park. In addition to holding water, the tower originally held the Western Springs police department, jail, and municipal offices. The village services all relocated out of the tower in 1957. It remained vacant until the Western Springs Historical Society opened a museum in the tower in 1970 following extensive renovations.

On August 30, 1991, a lightning strike set the tower's roof on fire and punctured the water tank. About half of the roof was destroyed and water from the firefighting caused significant damage to the tower's interior. Most of the valuable historical artifacts in the Tower Museum were saved by the fire department. The museum reopened in 1993 after extensive rehabilitation efforts.

== Structural features ==
Western Springs Water Tower has three floors and a basement. The tower is 112.5 feet (34.3 m) tall and 36.5 feet (11.1 m) in diameter. The limestone is 6.5 feet (2.0 m) thick at the base of the tower and thins to about three feet (0.91 m) thick at the top of the stone portion. The brick portion, which housed the water tank, is about 1.5 feet (0.46 m) thick. The capacity of the water tank was 169,000 U.S. gallons (640,000 liters). The tower is an example of Romanesque Revival architecture.

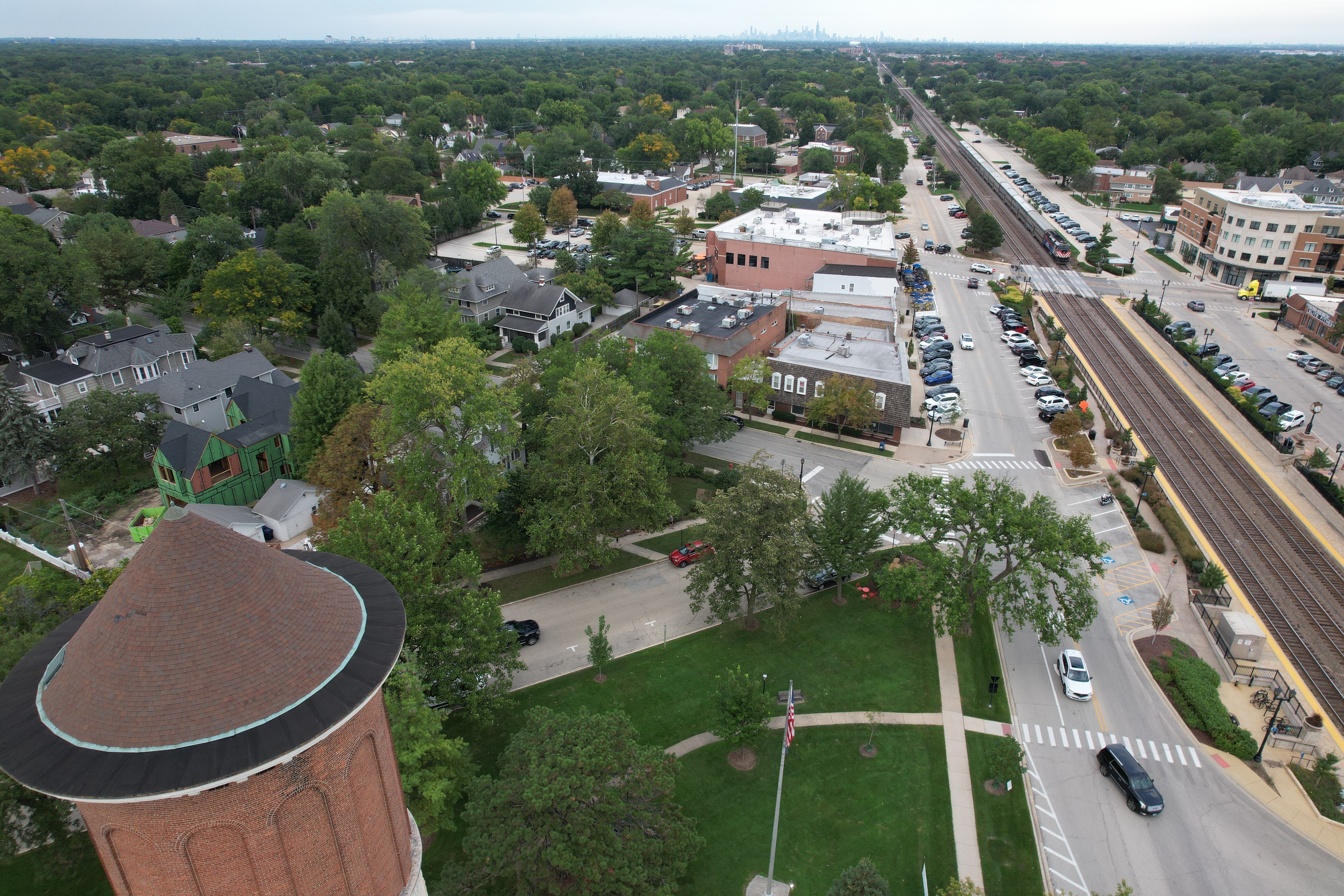
Water Tower with Chicago Skyline

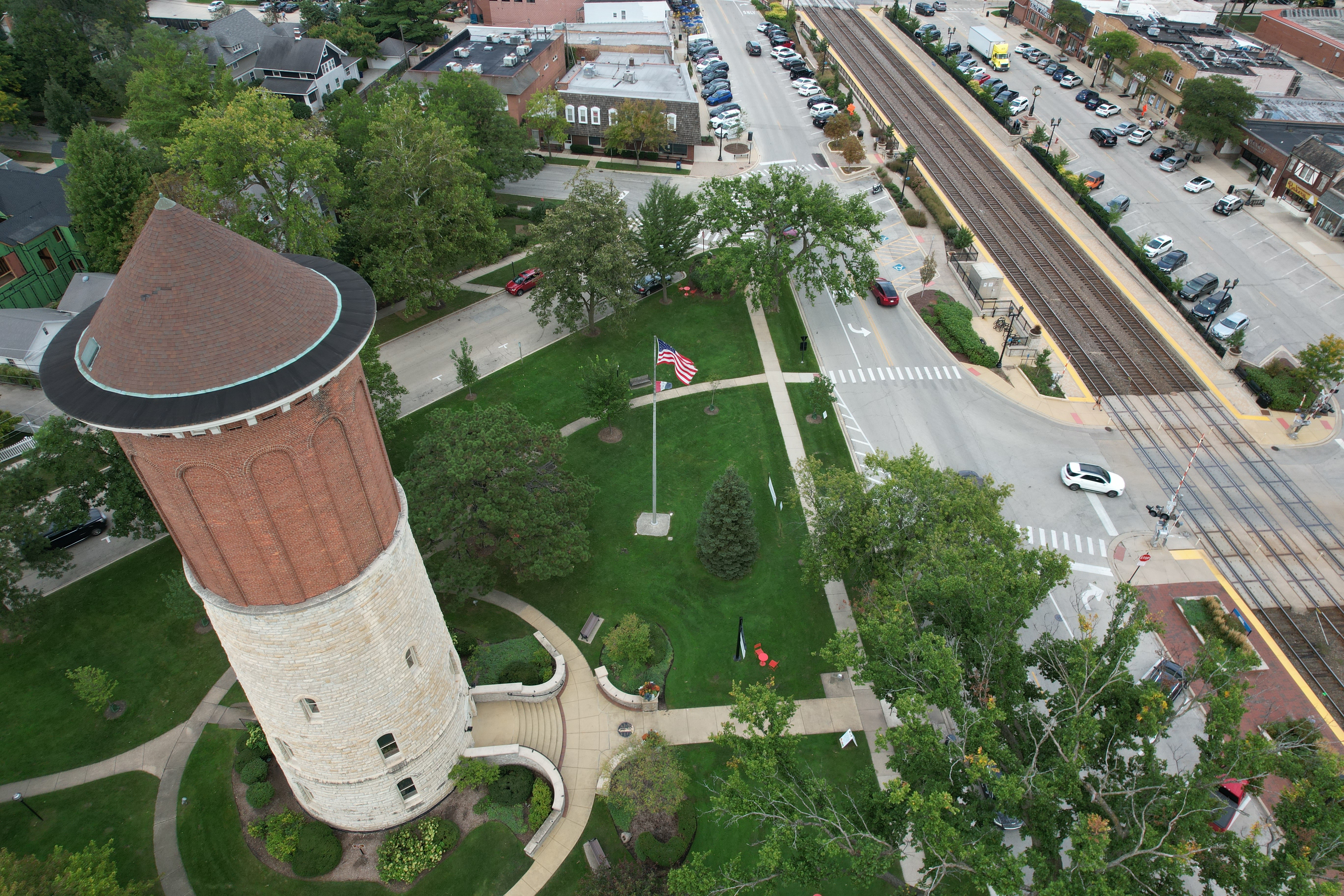
Aerial view

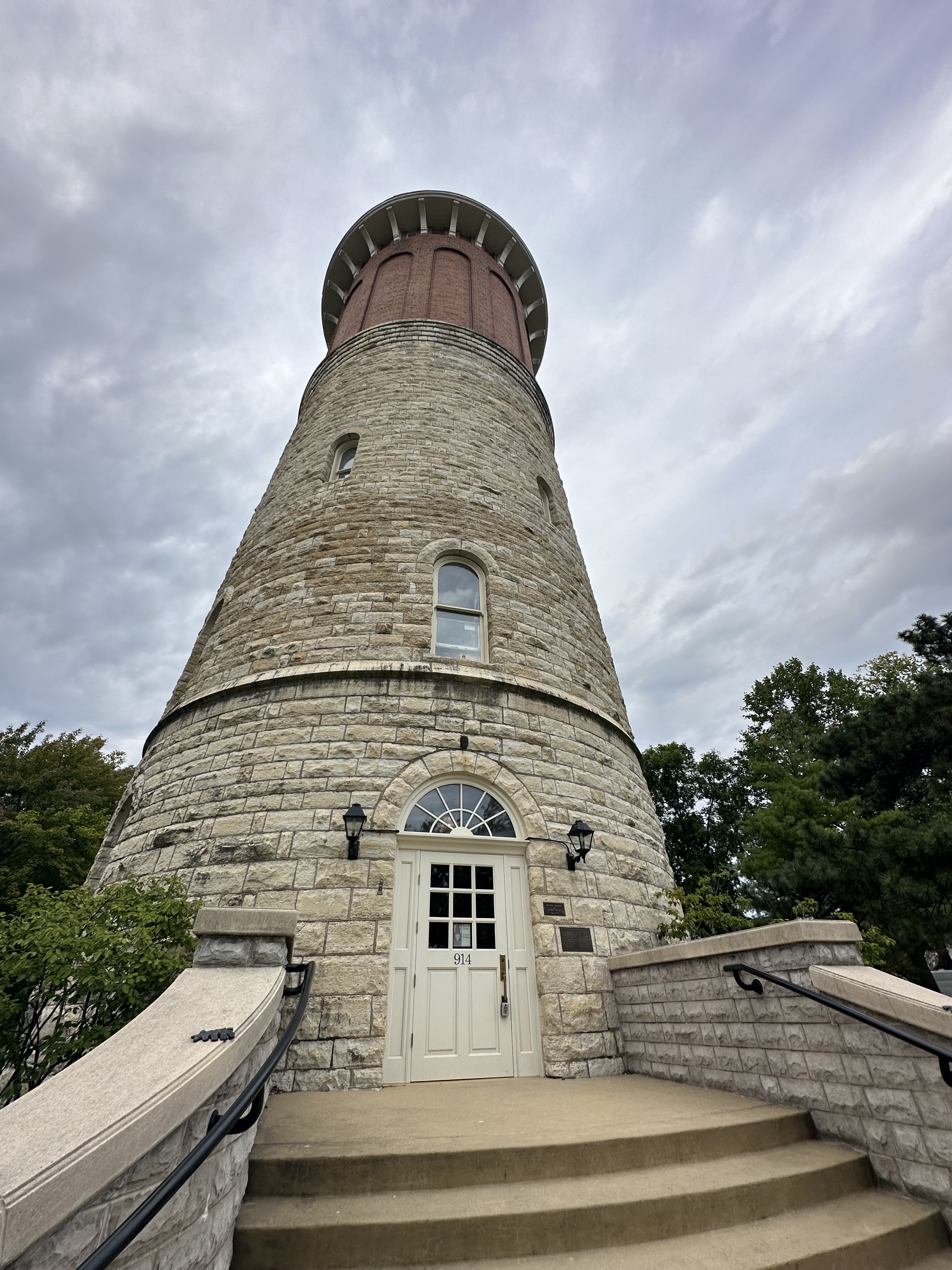
Entrance
