= Black Theater Alliance Awards =

The Black Theater Alliance Awards (BTAA) are theatrical awards presented annually to honor artistic excellence in the African American theatre community of the Chicagoland area. They were established in 1995.

== History ==
The Black Theater Alliance Awards were established in 1995 by Vincent Williams, an arts historian. It is a non-profit volunteer organization with the aim to celebrate excellence by African American theatre artists in the Chicagoland area.

As of 2025, the BTAA featured twenty-two award categories – Best Actor (Play), Best Actress (Play), Best Supporting Actor (Play), Best Supporting Actress (Play), Best Writing (Play), Best Director (Play), Best Production (Play), Best Actor (Musical), Best Actress (Musical), Best Supporting Actress (Musical), Best Supporting Actor (Musical), Best Writing (Musical), Best Direction (Musical), Best Original Book (Musical), Best Revival (Musical), Best Production (Musical), Best Ensemble (Musical or Play), Best Choreography (Musical), Best Sound (Musical or Play), Best Set Design (Musical or Play), Best Costume Design (Musical or Play), and Best Lighting Design (Musical or Play).

Cheryl Gatson is the president of the BTAA Board, McKinley Johnson is the treasurer, Valorie Harris is the secretary, and J. Michael Jones and Toney Hall are the directors.

== Best play ==
- 1995 - Doo Wop Shoo Bop - Black Ensemble Theater
- 1996 - Train Is Comin' - Chicago Theater Company
- 1997 - This Far By Faith - ETA Creative Arts Foundation
- 1998 - Chicago's Golden Soul - Black Ensemble Theater
- 2025 - Purpose - Steppenwolf Theatre

== Best production of a musical or revue ==
- 2003 - Howlin' At The Moon - Black Ensemble Theater
- 2004 - Eyes (play) - ETA Creative Arts Foundation
- 2005 - At Last: A Tribute To Etta James - Black Ensemble Theater
- 2006 - Nina Simone: The High Priestess Speaks - Black Ensemble Theater
- 2007 - Memphis Soul: The Story of Stax Records - Black Ensemble Theater
- 2008 - Sounds So Good Makes You Wanna Holler - Old School vs. Nu Skool - Black Ensemble Theater
- 2009 - Sanctified (play) - Congo Square Theatre Company
- 2025 - A Fall From Royalty - APC Theater
