= Mary Anne Adams =

African American lesbian activist

Mary Anne Adams, MSW, (born September 25, 1954) is an African American lesbian activist, social worker, and public health researcher who has focused on the health disparities within the lesbian and Black community. She also works at Georgia State University as the Director of the Community Engagement Core. Adams is most known for being the founder of ZAMI NOBLA (National Organization of Black Lesbians on Aging), an organization that provides resources to aid the coming-of-age process for Black lesbians over the age of 40.

== Early life ==
Adams was born on September 25, 1954, as the second oldest of 10 children in Oxford, Mississippi, specifically Freeman's Town, just soon after the start of the United States Civil Rights Movement. As a child, when she was not in school, she was spending her summers at her grandmother's (whom she was named after) house reading anything she could get her hands on. Adams used reading as a means of mental escape from her feelings of seclusion. One of the biggest turning points in her life was discovering youth activism where she banded together with other activists, lawyers, and social workers to fight for civil rights for people of color, specifically African American people. In 1971, when she was 16 years old, Adams went on to study social work and sociology at the University of Mississippi (Ole Miss) and eventually graduated at the age of 19. She later earned her master's degree in social work at Georgia State University in 2002. When she was young, her stepfather, Bubba, who adopted her, was hit and killed by a train. In her mid-twenties, her mother died, due to ovarian cancer at the age of 43. These events resulted in her assuming the responsibility of taking care of her three younger siblings.

== Activism ==
Adam's activism journey began when she was 12 years old in her hometown. A minister named Reverend Wayne Johnson launched the "Black House" where civil rights activists, social workers, organizations, attorneys, and students came together organize plans. She quickly became engulfed in the Black House where she was taught to embrace her blackness. She also aided in the creation and distribution of The Soul Force newspaper which was created in the Black House. Learning about Black history, protesting, and advocacy at the Black House from experienced activists became a regular occurrence for Adams. Her leaders there encouraged her to pursue higher education at Ole Miss to aid in the integration of the university.

After graduating from Ole Miss, she launched the Audre Lorde Scholarship Fund, with the help of the nonprofit organization ZAMI, to help financially support struggling LGBTQ Scholars of Color ($1000 per recipient) who openly expressed their sexuality and were also seeking higher education.

=== ZAMI NOBLA ===
As a child, Adams knew an elder woman that she called "Miss Savannah" who she spent ample time with. This bond is what later sparked Adam's interest in aging, specifically in Black lesbians. On her 34th birthday, Adams made the choice to move to Atlanta, Georgia to further pursue her education and career. There she became an executive board member of ZAMI, which was founded by Iris Rafi. Adams merged these two important aspects of her life, creating her nonprofit organization she named ZAMI NOBLA (National Organization of Black Lesbians on Aging). The primary motivations behind launching ZAMI NOBLA were to combat the invisibility of elder Black lesbians within the queer community and to help them learn about and cope with the aging process. Along with mental health support, ZAMI NOBLA aids in providing/finding housing for elder Black women who otherwise could not find any on their own. They focus on the intersectionality of being an older, Black, lesbian, and oftentimes poor, woman in the United States.

== See also ==
- Oral History: Interview with Mary Anne Adams by Madison Johnson, 2021-03 http://hdl.handle.net/20.500.12322/auc.passforward:0002.000
