= LiveWire Chicago Theatre =

Theatre arts organization based in Chicago

LiveWire Chicago Theatre is an Illinois not-for-profit theater arts organization based in Chicago.

Past seasons have included the works of Jean-Paul Sartre No Exit, Timberlake Wertenbaker Love of the Nightingale, Mark Healy's adaptation of John Fowles' novel The Collector and original work A/other Lover, Soldiers: The Desert Stand by Joshua Aaron Weinstein, VisionFest 2008, Eric Bogosian's Red Angel and David Lindsay-Abaire's Wonder of the World.
