= Free Street Theater =

- Formation: late 1960s by Patrick Henry
- Type: Theatre group
- Purpose: offers free theater to Chicago residents
- Location: Chicago, Illinois
- Website: https://freestreet.org/

Free Street Theater is located in Chicago, Illinois. Free Street Theater was founded by Goodman School of Drama graduate Patrick Henry (1936-1989) in the late 1960s. As a grant-funded and donation-supported theater, the organization gives free or pay-what-you-can performances focused on contemporary social themes that are meant to bring together different ages, races and socio-economic groups. Free Street has performed all across Chicago and toured both nationally and internationally.

== History ==
Free Street was founded by Patrick Henry in the late 1960s as a means to bring free theater to a broader range of Chicago's residents. It took theater out to the communities, did not charge admission, and created productions on contemporary themes, engendering better communication among races, social strata, and age groups. Free Street's focus on outreach drew not only the regular theater-goer, but also - and most successfully - the 90% of the population that did not normally attend theatrical performances. Performances occurred in many outdoor locations, especially in city parks and housing project plazas. Free Street pioneered what is now the Chicago Park District's Arts Partner in Residence program, setting up a headquarters in the historic Pulaski Park Field House. Today, Free Street performs in its home theater at Pulaski Park, and continues its legacy of performing for free in public spaces.

== Awards ==
The Free Street Theater received a Joseph Jefferson Special Citation in 1987 for their production "Project!"

In 2009, Free Street Theater Received the Hopie Award for Creativity and Innovation in youth theatre from the Lester and Hope Abelson Fund for the Performing Arts.

== Productions ==
In the late 1980s, Free Street performed "Project!" which dealt with life in public housing. Free Street Theater had established a long-term residency at the Cabrini-Green housing project. Through recording interviews with residents about their experiences living in public housing, the idea for a musical play was born. The play was cast mostly with residents from Cabrini-Green, and received critical acclaim. The production was invited to the London International Festival of Theatre in 1987.

Other notable productions include:

- "What Do You Want to be When You Grow Old," 1984
- "Standing Out in a Drive By World," 1992
- "Notes from Earth," 1992
- "Malcolm X: Reminiscences of a Revolutionary," 1992
- "Butch the Smoking Cow," 1992
- "Learning to Breathe in a Box," 1994
- "Held Captive by Daydreams," 1995
- "Mad Joy," 1996
- "Body House," 1997
- "Alas Poor Yorick"
- "We Know, We Know – You Know"
- "DOPE: 420 Stories About Weed, Pot, Kush, Prisons, Parents and People," 2012.
- "100 Hauntings," 2016.

A list of current productions can be found at freestreet.org.

== Archival Collection ==
The Free Street Theater Records (1967-1999) were processed by the Black Metropolis Research Consortium's Color Curtain processing project in 2013. They are available to the public at Chicago Public Library Special Collections, Harold Washington Library Center, Chicago, Illinois. The Free Street Collection includes records illustrating the theater's productions, budgets, touring activity, promotional materials, and the performance work of Free Street Too which featured a senior citizen cast.
