= ETA Creative Arts Foundation =

Theatre and museum in Illinois, US

Coordinates: 41.7577°N 87.594188°W

ETA Creative Arts Foundation, founded in 1971, is an African-American theatre and art museum in Chicago.
