= Black Ensemble Theater Company =

Theater company in Illinois, US

- Headquarters: Chicago, Illinois
- Website: https://blackensembletheater.org/

Black Ensemble Theater Company is a theatre company that performs at the Black Ensemble Cultural Center in the Uptown community area of Chicago, Illinois. The company is known for productions related to African-American culture, especially musicals depicting notable African-American musicians and performers. The company is a significant contributor to Chicago's emergence as a Theater Town, and its theater has been selected as one of the 25 top major theaters in the country by the Encyclopædia Britannica Almanac.

The company performed in the Black Ensemble Theater at 4520 North Beacon Street until it opened a new state of the art 50,000-square-foot (4,600 m^{2}) Black Ensemble Cultural Center at 4450 N. Clark Street, on November 18, 2011. The company raised $20M dollar to build the new theater which is also in Uptown. The new Black Ensemble Theater Cultural Center was designed by Morris Architects Planners, who has previously designed Steppenwolf, Lookingglass, and Playhouse on the Square. The new theater is being located in a former warehouse that cost US$3.5 million to purchase and many times more than that to renovate. Approximately $20 million is being raised to fund the construction of the new theater.

Among the recent productions are musicals celebrating Curtis Mayfield, Marvin Gaye, Jackie Wilson, Billie Holiday, Dionne Warwick, Teddy Pendergrass and Stax Records. The production I Am Who I Am (The Story of Teddy Pendergrass) that opened on March 15, 2008, was extended through the end of 2008. The company has a history of presenting as many as a half-dozen productions a year since opening in 1976. The theater's productions have been critically recognized. Some have had lengthy multiple-year runs and national tours such as The Jackie Wilson Story, which was the first traveling production of the Black Ensemble Touring Venture and which played for four weeks at the Apollo Theater. The theater company has also traveled nationally to perform to festivals.

The group's more than one hundred performances have been produced by its founder, Jackie Taylor, since 1976. When producing musical biographies, Taylor uses a formula of including at least eighteen of the artist's hits, some high points and low points in the artist's career, at least one climactic moment of chaos and an uplifting ending, which is the most important element.
