= Robbie Leppzer =

American documentary filmmaker

- Born: 1957 or 1958 (age 66–67)
- Education: Hampshire College
- Occupations: Filmmaker; videographer
- Years active: 1978–present

Robbie Leppzer (born 1957/1958) is an American filmmaker and videographer known for directing documentary films about grassroots activism. He is the owner of the production company Turning Tide Productions. Works directed or co-directed by Leppzer include Seabrook 1977 (1978), Harvest of Peace (1985), Columbus Didn't Discover Us (1992), An Act of Conscience (1997), The Peace Patriots (2005), and Power Struggle (2016).

== Early life ==
Leppzer was born in Wendell, Massachusetts, and grew up in Winchester. In high school, he produced a radio show titled Roots of the Earth, which explored the Wounded Knee Occupation, and which earned a first prize award in a National Public Radio (NPR) young people's festival.

== Career ==
In the 1970s, Leppzer moved from Winchester to Leverett in the Pioneer Valley, and attended Hampshire College in Amherst for two years. Leppzer's first feature-length video documentary film, Seabrook 1977 (1978), which he co-directed with Phyllis Joffe, chronicles demonstrators protesting the construction of the Seabrook Station Nuclear Power Plant in Seabrook, New Hampshire. In the early 1980s, Leppzer produced a 13-part radio series titled Rural Lives, which was broadcast on WFCR.

In 1984, Leppzer premiered Choose Life, a short film that documents an anti-nuclear protest in New York City on June 12, 1982; the protest was attended by around one million participants. That same year, Leppzer began production on Harvest of Peace (1985), a documentary about a group of Americans participating in the cotton harvest in a village in northern Nicaragua. Produced on a budget of $20,000, filming for Harvest of Peace took place for two weeks in Nicaragua, followed by 14 months of post-production in Leverett. The documentary premiered at the Telluride Film Festival in September 1985, and received a theatrical release in November 1985. With the release of Harvest of Peace, Leppzer established his own production company, Turning Tide Productions.

In 1992, Leppzer premiered Columbus Didn't Discover Us, a short documentary filmed at the First Continental Conference on 500 Years of Indian Resistance in Quito, Ecuador, in 1990. In 1994, the Leppzer-directed short documentary film Futbolito (also known as Viva Futbolito!) was released, which follows footbag enthusiasts in Nicaragua and Guatemala.

In 1997, the Leppzer-directed documentary An Act of Conscience premiered at the Sundance Film Festival. The film documents events surrounding war tax resisters Randy Kehler and Betsy Corner, whose home was seized by the Internal Revenue Service (IRS) and sold by the US government to another couple, prompting Kehler, Corner, and hundreds of supporters to occupy the property in protest. In 2001, Leppzer directed Voices for Peace, a documentary about the post–September 11 anti-war movement. In 2005, he premiered The Peace Patriots, which centers around opposition to the Iraq War.

In 2010, Leppzer began filming on Power Struggle, a documentary about activists opposed to the Vermont Yankee Nuclear Power Plant in Vernon, Vermont. The film, which features peace activist Frances Crowe, was released in 2016.

== Personal life ==
Leppzer has been a member of a pro-feminist men's group based in the Pioneer Valley since the 1970s.

== Partial filmography ==
Year	Title	Notes	Ref(s)
1978	Seabrook 1977	Documentary film; co-directed with Phyllis Joffe	
1984	Choose Life	Short documentary film	
1985	Harvest of Peace	Short documentary film	
1992	Columbus Didn't Discover Us	Short documentary film	
1994	Futbolito	Also known as Viva Futbolito!; short documentary film	
1997	An Act of Conscience	Documentary film	
2001	Voices for Peace	Short documentary film	
2005	The Peace Patriots	Documentary film	
2016	Power Struggle	Documentary film	

== Accolades ==
Year	Award	Category	Nominated work	Result	Ref(s)
1986	San Antonio Film Festival	Best Non-Fiction Filmmaker	Harvest of Peace	Won	
1987	New England Film & Video Festival	Curator's Choice	Harvest of Peace	Won	
