= Mitch Rouse =

American actor (born 1964)

- Born: Edward Mitchell Rouse; August 6, 1964 (age 62); Knoxville, Tennessee, U.S.
- Education: Oak Ridge High School (Tennessee); University of Tennessee
- Occupation: Actor
- Years active: 1992–present
- Spouse: Andrea Bendewald (m. 2001)
- Children: 2

Edward Mitchell "Mitch" Rouse (born August 6, 1964) is an American actor, filmmaker, television show maker. He is known for co-creating Comedy Central's Exit 57 (1995–1996) and Strangers with Candy (1999–2000), with fellow The Second City alumni Stephen Colbert, Paul Dinello and Amy Sedaris. In 2008 he created and starred in Spike TV's comedy series Factory.

== Early life ==
Rouse was born in Knoxville, Tennessee, and raised in Oak Ridge, Tennessee. He played football at Oak Ridge High School, where he graduated in 1983. He attended the University of Tennessee, then developed an interest in acting.

== Career ==
Rouse studied acting in Atlanta and later, improvisation in Chicago, where he became involved with improv guru Del Close and Chicago's Second City Theatre where he met long-time friend David Pasquesi and future collaborators Amy Sedaris and Paul Dinello. After writing and performing in a number of Second City productions, Rouse, Dinello and Sedaris moved to New York City where they put on a play titled Stitches, which they performed Off-Broadway at LaMama theater.

=== Television ===
In 1995, with Sedaris, Dinello, and fellow Second City alumn, Stephen Colbert, he co-created and starred in Comedy Central's sketch show Exit 57. The show aired through 1996. Although it lasted only 12 episodes, the show received favorable reviews and was nominated for five CableACE Awards in 1995, in categories including best writing, performance, and comedy series.

After the show was cancelled, Rouse and Sedaris had developed another pitch, which Sedaris described as "something based on after-school specials" inspired by shows like The Brady Bunch. They presented it first to MTV, as Rouse knew someone there; while his friend loved it, they were told the channel would not go for it. Later Dinello and Colbert joined them, and Comedy Central picked it up. Strangers with Candy ran from 1999 to 2000 for three seasons

Rouse has further appeared on episodes of Reno 911!, Home Improvement, Still Standing, The Norm Show and Lost at Home. He appeared in seasons 4–6 of the sitcom According to Jim as Ryan Gibson, Dana's fiancée and later husband. Rouse also voiced Round John Virgin and Comet in the Holiday movie Olive, the Other Reindeer.

Rouse created and starred in Spike TV's 2008 comedy series Factory.

In 2013, Rouse played Eddie, the lead character in a single episode of the television series Call Me Crazy: A Five Film.

=== Film ===
Rouse appeared in several feature films, including Austin Powers, Friends with Money, Rudy, and The Heartbreak Kid. His most prominent screen appearance as an actor was playing the leading role opposite Janeane Garofalo in 1997's Sweethearts. He directed and co-wrote the movie Employee of the Month starring Matt Dillon, Steve Zahn, Christina Applegate, and Andrea Bendewald as well as co-wrote Without a Paddle, starring Seth Green and Dax Shepard.

== Filmography ==
=== Film ===
Year	Title	Role	Notes
1993	Rudy	Jim	
1996	The Truth About Cats & Dogs	Bee Man	
1997	Sweethearts	Arliss	
1999	Austin Powers: The Spy Who Shagged Me	Radar Operator	
2004	Employee of the Month	Jimmy Riggs	Writer / Director
2004	Without a Paddle	—	Writer
2006	Friends with Money	Party Guest	
2007	The Heartbreak Kid	—	Writer
2008	Spy School	Mr. Miller	
TBA	Killing Chuck		Short film

=== Television ===
Year	Title	Role	Notes
1995–1996	The Dana Carvey Show	Various	Writer / Performer
1996	Spin City		Writer
1998–1999	The Secret Lives of Men	Phil	Main cast
1999–2000	Strangers with Candy	Donny / Various	Co-creator / Writer
2001–2009	According to Jim	Dr. Ryan Gibson	Recurring role
2008	Factory	Gary	Creator / Director
2012	The Neighbors	Real Estate Agent	Guest star
2013	Call Me Crazy: A Five Film	Eddie	Director (segment)

== Personal life ==
In 2001, he married actress Andrea Bendewald in Malibu, California. The couple met while performing on the sitcom The Secret Lives of Men. Jennifer Aniston was the matron of honor at their wedding on August 19, 2001. He has two children, one son and one daughter.
