= Improv Institute =

Former improv comedy company in Chicago

The Improv Institute was an improvisational comedy company in Chicago from 1984 until 1994. The mainstage show was improvised following audience suggestions. The troupe had two storefront-theaters, both on West Belmont Avenue on Chicago's North side, first at 2939 W. Belmont (1984–1990), and later at 2319 W. Belmont (1991–1994).

Many theatrical productions had their debuts at the Improv Institute, including Flanagan's Wake on March 19, 1994.

The Second City producer Kelly Leonard has stated that the Improv Institute was "my favorite place to see improv, other than The Second City." - Chicago Tribune, January 15, 2004

== History ==
The Improv Institute was founded at the end of 1983 by the late John Michael Michalski, who would go on to direct at The Second City in Chicago. The original cast included Michalski, Rick Hall (Seinfeld, Curb Your Enthusiasm, Arrested Development, Factory), Kate Kirkpatrick, Patricia Musker (a.k.a. Roxy Bellows, also a co-writer of Flanagan's Wake), Michael Raysses (The Drew Carey Show), Andrew J. Sten, and Jill Talley (Mr. Show, SpongeBob SquarePants). They were later joined by Ron West (3rd Rock from the Sun). Later incarnations of the mainstage cast would include Jack Bronis (Early Edition, Chicago Overcoat, director/co-writer of Flanagan's Wake), Mark Czoske (co-writer of Flanagan's Wake), Evan Gore (Futurama writer), Ross Gottstein (Babylon 5, Frasier), Laura Hall (Whose Line Is It Anyway?), Tom Hanigan (Slice of Pie), Amy Hartl, Phil Lusardi (co-writer of Flanagan's Wake), Patricia Musker (a.k.a. Roxy Bellows, also co-writer of Flanagan's Wake), Bonnie Shadrake (co-writer of Flanagan's Wake), and Brad Sherman.

Several Improv Institute performers went on to create The Noble Fool Theater Company.

Other notable performers who made appearances at the Improv Institute have included Rose Abdoo (Gilmore Girls, Curb Your Enthusiasm), Sean Abley (Socket), Mark Belden (thirtysomething), Mark Belzman (According to Jim), Kevin L. Burrows (Naked States), Cindy Caponera (Drunkboat, Curb Your Enthusiasm), Will Clinger (Wild Chicago, ER, Early Edition), Kevin Crowley (CSI, Without a Trace), Paul Dinello (Strangers with Candy), Jon Favreau (Swingers, director of Elf and Iron Man, host of Dinner for Five), Jeff Garlin (Curb Your Enthusiasm), Chris Hogan (MADtv, 3rd Rock from the Sun), Bonnie Hunt (Cheaper by the Dozen, The Bonnie Hunt Show), Carlos Jacott (CSI, Big Love, Firefly), Jenna Jolovitz (MADtv writer), Jeff Kahn (The 40-Year-Old Virgin), John Lehr (10 Items or Less), Joe Liss (Less than Perfect, Curb Your Enthusiasm), Michael McCarthy (screenwriter), Adam McKay (Saturday Night Live), Susan Messing, Theresa Mulligan (Mr. Show), Joel Murray (Dharma & Greg, Mad Men), Aliza Murietta, Peter Murietta, Dave Pasquesi (Strangers with Candy, Curb Your Enthusiasm, Factory), Paula Poundstone, John Rubano (According to Jim), Ruth Rudnick (NCIS), Horatio Sanz (Saturday Night Live), Lynda Shadrake, Casey Siemaszko (Young Guns, NYPD Blue, Biloxi Blues), Faith Soloway, Matt Tiegler (Gods and Heroes), Barb Wallace (screenwriter), Dan Johnson-Weinberger, George Wendt (Cheers), and Jim Zulevic (Seinfeld).

The 30th anniversary of the Improv Institute was celebrated as part of the 2014 Chicago Improv Festival at Stage 773 in Chicago.
