= Power Struggle (film) =

2016 American documentary film

- Promotional release poster
- Directed by: Robbie Leppzer
- Music by: John Sheldon
- Production company: Turning Tide Productions
- Distributed by: New Day Films; Kanopy
- Release date: November 3, 2016 (Brattleboro)
- Running time: 86 minutes 52 minutes (abridged version)
- Country: United States
- Language: English

Power Struggle is a 2016 American documentary film directed by Robbie Leppzer. Filmed over the course of five years, the documentary follows a political struggle between activists, elected officials, the US government, and the Entergy corporation, that led to the closure of the Vermont Yankee Nuclear Power Plant in Vernon, Vermont. The film features peace activist Frances Crowe.

Filming for Power Struggle began in the winter of 2010. Power Struggle premiered on November 3, 2016, at the Latchis Theatre in Brattleboro.
