= Scrappers Film Group =

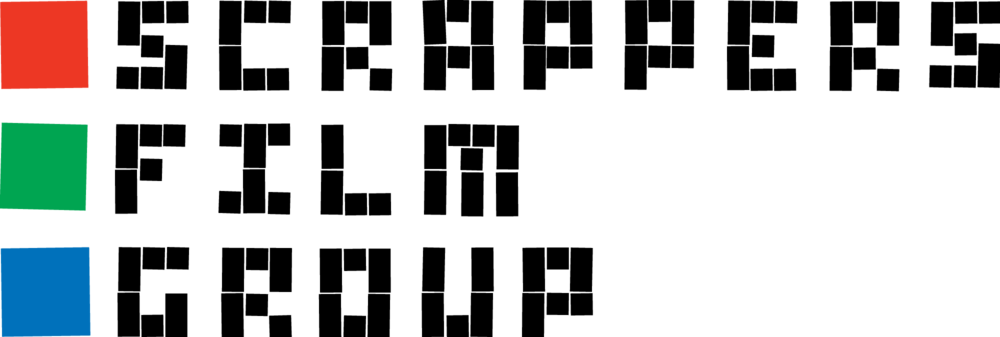
- Industry: Film
- Genre: Documentary, Hybrid
- Founded: 2013
- Founder: Brian Ashby; Ben Kolak; David Jacobson
- Headquarters: Chicago, IL, U.S.A.
- Products: Films, Web Series, Strategic Videos
- Website: scrappersfilmgroup.com

Scrappers Film Group was the prior name of Truth & Documentary, a documentary film production company in Chicago, Illinois. Founding partners Ben Kolak and Brian Ashby's inaugural film Scrappers won “Best Documentary Feature” and the “Audience Award” at the 2010 Chicago Underground Film Festival. Scrappers Film Group was chosen by NewCity Film in 2016 and 2018 to be among the "50 Chicago Screen Gems."

Scrappers Film Group produced educational and socially motivated documentary work, including films The Area, Stateville Calling, Accident, MD and web series Central Standard: On Education, Popcorn Politics, and Rights Lab, inspiring audiences to question the familiar and build empathy. In 2020 Kolak bought the other partners' shares and renamed the company Truth & Documentary. Truth & Documentary owns and maintains Scrappers Film Group's archives and continues to produce video for clients and original work.

== Works ==
Title	Release	Type	Partner(s)
Scrappers	2010	Film	Cinetic Media
The Grid	2011 - 2017	Web Series	Gapers Block
Maydays	2013	Film	International Latino Cultural Center of Chicago
Central Standard: On Education	2014	Web Series	PBS, WTTW
Popcorn Politics	2015 - 2018	Web Series	The A.V. Club
Rights Lab	2016	Web Series	Truthout
Accident, MD	2017	Film	Vimeo (Staff Pick, "Best of the Year" Award)
Brujos	2018	Web Series	OTV
The Area	2018	Film	
Stateville Calling	2019	Film	Film Independent
