= Andrea Bendewald =

American actress

- Born: Andrea R. Bendewald; 1969 or 1970 (age 56–57)
- Education: High School of Performing Arts; Wright State University
- Years active: 1995–present
- Spouse: Mitch Rouse (m. 2001)
- Children: 2

Andrea R. Bendewald (born 1969 or 1970) is an American actress. She is best known for her role as Maddy Piper on Suddenly Susan.

== Early life and education ==
Bendewald is the daughter of Judith and Mervin Bendewald, a clothing store owner.

Bendewald attended the High School of Performing Arts and later earned a Bachelor of Fine Arts degree from Wright State University.

== Career ==
In addition to performing in film, stage, and television, Bendewald also teaches acting in the Professional Programs at the UCLA School of Theater, Film and Television. She also founded The Art of Circling, a self-improvement and spiritual program.

== Personal life ==
In October 1998, Bendewald met actor Mitch Rouse on the set of The Secret Lives of Men. They married on August 19, 2001, at the Saddlerock Ranch in Malibu, California. The couple have two children.

She is a long-time friend of Jennifer Aniston since the two met in Manhattan's High School for the Performing Arts.

== Filmography ==
Year	Title	Role	Notes
1995–1996	Simon	Libby Keeler	TV series (15 episodes)
1996	Brotherly Love	Phoebe	TV series (1 episode)
1996	Caroline in the City	Leslie	TV series (1 episode)
1997	Picture Perfect	Pregnant Friend	
1997	Ellen	Sherry	TV series (1 episode)
1997	Seinfeld	Celia	TV series (1 episode)
1997	Men Behaving Badly	Lana	TV series (1 episode)
1997–1999	Suddenly Susan	Maddy Piper	TV series (48 episodes)
1998	The Thin Pink Line	Dust	
2000	Popular	Bonnie	TV series (1 episode)
2000	That's Life	Dean Pamela Orman	TV series (1 episode)
2000	Stark Raving Mad	Brittany Farraday	TV series (1 episode)
2001	Amy's Orgasm	Beautiful Girl	
2001	One Night at McCool's	Karen	
2001	Friends	Megan Bailey	TV series (1 episode)
2001	Cursed	Lucy Keith	TV series (1 episode)
2001	Providence	Elizabeth Jannaur	TV series (1 episode)
2002	That '70s Show	Ms. McGee	TV series (1 episode)
2004	Employee of the Month	Wendy	
2004	CSI: Miami	Monica Reynoso	TV series (1 episode)
2005	House	Cecilia Carter	TV series (1 episode)
2005	Entourage	Jess	TV series (1 episode)
2005	Life on a Stick	Sandy	TV series (1 episode)
2005	Center of the Universe	Jewel	TV series (1 episode)
2006	Stick It	Madison's Mom	
2006	Twins	Phyllis	TV series (1 episode)
2006	Two and a Half Men	Terry Sholander	TV series (1 episode)
2008	Without a Trace	Patricia Ross	TV series (1 episode)
2008	According to Jim	Sheila	TV series (1 episode)
2009	The Game	Laura	TV series (1 episode)
2011	Five	Kate	TV movie
2011	Last Man Standing	Charlie	TV series (1 episode)
2012	Good Luck Charlie	Lynn Walsh	TV series (1 episode)
2013	Contribution of a Verse	Coach	Short
2013	Browsers	Amy Winslow	TV movie
2013	Call Me Crazy: A Five Film	Laura	TV movie
2013–2014	Legit	Georgia	TV series (6 episodes)
2014	Mourning Glory	Anne	Short
2016	Gala & Godfrey	The Healer	
2016	Mary + Jane	Keather	TV series (1 episode)
2019	Murder Mystery	Client #2	
2019	The Morning Show	Valérie	TV series (6 episodes)

== Awards and nominations ==
Ovation Awards

- 2011: Nominated for Featured Actress in a Play for the role of Jane in "Girls Talk"
