= Central Standard: On Education =

Documentary series on Chicago schools

- Genre: Web series
- Directed by: Brian Ashby; Ben Kolak
- Theme music composer: Mojo Lorwin
- Country of origin: United States
- Original language: English
- No. of seasons: 1
- No. of episodes: 9

Production
- Executive producer: Anne Gleason
- Producers: Emmanuel Camacho; Rachel Dickson; David Jacobson; Sara Medlin; Carley Mostar
- Production locations: Chicago, Illinois and surrounding areas
- Cinematography: Brian Ashby; Emmanuel Camacho; Ben Kolak
- Production company: Scrappers Film Group

Original release
- Network: WTTW
- Release: April 11 – June 9, 2014

Central Standard: On Education is a documentary web series that focuses on Chicago's education system. Following five 8th grade students attending public schools across the Chicago metropolitan area, Central Standard: On Education chronicles the challenges these students face while transitioning to high school.

Central Standard: On Education was produced by Scrappers Film Group and WTTW.
