= Tava Smiley =

American actress

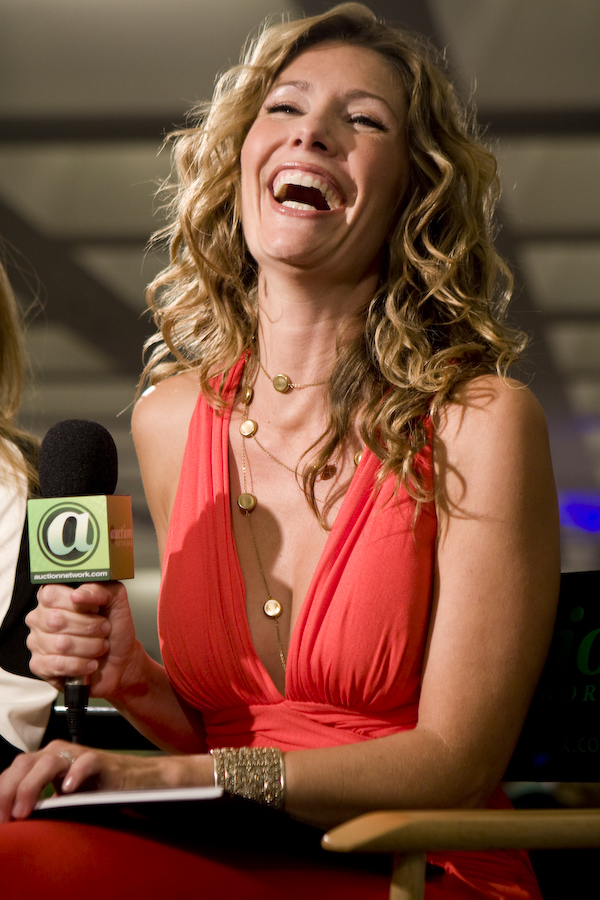
- Tava Smiley in 2009
- Born: Tava Michelle Smiley; Theodosia, Missouri, U.S.
- Occupations: Television personality Actress
- Years active: 1987–present

Tava Michelle Smiley is an American actress and television host.

Smiley was born in Theodosia, Missouri. Smiley's first name is her mother's maiden name. She is a 1989 graduate of William Chrisman High School in Independence, MO. Her most notable appearances to date have included the following:

- Playing the role of Chloe Morgan Ashton in the soap opera General Hospital from 1999 to 2001;
- Hosting the television show Clean Sweep for its second season (2004–2005);
- Serving as a correspondent for the television series Extra;
- Serving as a sideline reporter for the PBR;
- Serving as a correspondent for the Fox Movie Channel network.

Her resume also lists her hosting of E!'s Wild On Resorts and Wild On Italy, WTTW's Wild Chicago, and Lifetime Television's Style Surrender. As an actress, she has had guest roles in many television programs, notably Beverly Hills, 90210; Nash Bridges; Freaks and Geeks; and Walker, Texas Ranger. Her credits also include feature films and theater work.

Currently, Smiley is the entertainment reporter for the Fox Movie Channel, as well as host of HGTV's I Want That! Kitchens, and is sideline reporter for OLN's PBR. In 2007, she became the primary host for The Auction Network.

Smiley appeared in the 2009 horror film Murder World and in the comedy film Good Luck Chuck.

Smiley is married to Lauder Robinson and gave birth to their first child in September 2012.
