= Harvest of Peace =

1985 short documentary film

- Retrospective promotional poster
- Directed by: Robbie Leppzer
- Edited by: Robbie Leppzer
- Production company: Turning Tide Productions
- Release dates: September 1985 (TFF); November 1985 (US)
- Running time: 24 minutes
- Country: United States
- Language: English
- Budget: $20,000

Harvest of Peace is a 1985 American short documentary film directed by Robbie Leppzer. The film, shot during the height of the US-backed Contra war in Nicaragua, follows a group of 150 Americans who spend two weeks in a village in northern Nicaragua, where they participate in a cotton harvest.

Harvest of Peace premiered at the Telluride Film Festival (TFF) in September 1985, where it screened on a double bill with another documentary, Nicaragua Was Our Home, directed by Lee Shapiro. Harvest of Peace received its theatrical release in November 1985.

== Production ==
Harvest of Peace was created, directed, and edited by Robbie Leppzer. Production on the film began in the autumn of 1984, which was shot over a two-week period in Nicaragua. Following filming, Leppzer returned to his home in Leverett, Massachusetts, where he spent nine months on audio editing and fundraising for the film. Post-production continued for an additional five months, which Leppzer spent as "a prisoner to his editing table." The film ultimately cost $20,000 to complete, and was financed by individual supporters as well as grants from small private foundations.

== Reception ==
Reviewing the film following its TFF premiere, Catharine Rambeau of the Detroit Free Press referred to both it and Nicaragua Was Our Home as "classic knee-jerk-liberal graduate theses. Politics deserves better."

=== Accolades ===
| Year | Award | Category | Result | Ref(s) |
|---|---|---|---|---|
| 1986 | San Antonio Film Festival | Best Non-Fiction Film | Won | |
| 1987 | New England Film & Video Festival | Curator's Choice | Won | |
