= 10 That Changed America =

Television documentary film series

10 That Changed America was an American documentary television series produced by Chicago, Illinois PBS member station WTTW from 2013 to 2018. The series, presented by Geoffrey Baer and produced by Dan Protess, highlighted the history of architecture and urban planning in the United States. It comprised seven episodes, each approximately 55 minutes in length. The initial episode on 10 Buildings That Changed America was broadcast in 2013. Three episodes about houses, towns and parks followed in 2016. Season 2 with three further episodes covering streets, monuments and marvels aired in July 2018.

== Season 1 ==
- Episode 1, titled 10 Buildings That Changed America, aired on May 12, 2013. The buildings were presented in chronological order of completion and included the Virginia State Capitol (1788), Trinity Church (1877), Wainwright Building (1891), Robie House (1910), Highland Park Ford Plant (1910), Southdale Center (1956), Seagram Building (1958), Dulles International Airport (1962), Vanna Venturi House (1964), and the Disney Concert Hall (2003).
- Episode 2, 10 Homes That Changed America, was broadcast on April 4, 2016. The program presented ten American homes in chronological order that included Taos Pueblo (1400s), Monticello (1809), Lyndhurst (1842), The Tenement (mid-1800s), The Gamble House (1908), Langston Terrace Dwellings (1938), Fallingwater (1937), Eames House (1949), Marina City (1962) and Glidehouse (2004).
- Episode 3, 10 Parks That Changed America, was broadcast on April 11, 2016. Ten parks were presented in chronological order of their founding. These were Squares of Savannah (1733), Fairmount Park (1812), Mount Auburn Cemetery (1831), Central Park, New York (1857), Chicago's Neighborhood Parks (1869), San Antonio River Walk (1929), Overton Park (1906), Freeway Park, Seattle Washington (1976), Gas Works Park, Seattle, Washington (1975) and The High Line, New York Сity, (2009).
- Episode 4, 10 Towns That Changed America, was broadcast on April 18, 2016. The program presented ten towns in chronological order of their founding. These included St. Augustine, Florida (1565), Philadelphia, Pennsylvania (1682), Salt Lake City, Utah (1847), Riverside, Illinois (1868), Pullman, Illinois (1880), Greenbelt, Maryland (1935), Levittown, New York (1947), Southwest Washington, DC (1952), Seaside, Florida (1981) and the Pearl District, Portland, Oregon (1997).

== Season 2 ==
- Episode 1, 10 Streets That Changed America, was broadcast July 10, 2018. The chosen streets, in rough chronological order of establishment, were New York City's Broadway, the Boston Post Road linking Boston, MA to New York, NY, St. Charles Avenue in New Orleans, LA, the National Road linking Cumberland, MD to Vandalia, IL, Brooklyn's Eastern Parkway in New York City, Woodward Avenue in Detroit, MI, the Lincoln Highway from New York, NY to San Francisco, CA, Greenwood Avenue in Tulsa, OK, Wilshire Boulevard in Los Angeles, CA, and the Kalamazoo Mall outdoor pedestrian shopping mall at Kalamazoo, MI.
- Episode 2, 10 Monuments That Changed America, aired July 17, 2018. The chosen monuments were the Bunker Hill Monument at Boston, MA (1843), the Statue of Liberty (1886), Standing Soldiers monuments to Civil War dead (mass-produced after 1865), the Robert Gould Shaw/54th Regiment Memorial at Boston, MA (1897), the Lincoln Memorial at Washington, DC (1922), Mount Rushmore (1941), the Gateway Arch at St. Louis, MO (1965), the Vietnam Veterans Memorial at Washington, DC (1982), the AIDS Memorial Quilt (1987), and the Oklahoma City National Memorial at Oklahoma City, OK (2000).
- Episode 3, 10 Modern Marvels That Changed America, aired on July 24, 2018. The civil engineering feats were the Erie Canal (1825), the John A. Roebling Suspension Bridge across the Ohio River at Cincinnati, OH (1866), the Transcontinental Railroad (1869), the Eads Bridge across the Mississippi River at St. Louis, MO (1874), the Reversal of the Chicago River (1900), the Holland Tunnel under the Hudson River connecting New York, NY to Jersey City, NJ (1927), the Hoover Dam (1936), the Colorado River Aqueduct (1935), the Interstate Highway System (1956), and New Orleans' Hurricane and Storm Damage Risk Reduction System (2005)

== Reception ==
The initial episode on 10 Buildings That Changed America received mixed reviews from architecture critics. It was recognised as achieving the goal to "explain complex battles over architectural ideas, in clear language, to a broad audience". However, it was also criticised as lacking substance and failing to address "the historical, social and economic impact of these 10 buildings". The Minneapolis Star Tribune highlighted the series 1 episode covering 10 Homes That Changed America for informativeness on "influential homes that transformed residential living".
