= The Truth About Cats & Dogs =

1996 film by Michael Lehmann

- Theatrical release poster
- Directed by: Michael Lehmann
- Written by: Audrey Wells
- Produced by: Cari-Esta Albert
- Starring: Uma Thurman; Janeane Garofalo; Ben Chaplin; Jamie Foxx
- Cinematography: Robert Brinkmann
- Edited by: Stephen Semel
- Music by: Howard Shore
- Production company: Noon Attack
- Distributed by: 20th Century Fox
- Release date: April 26, 1996
- Running time: 97 minutes
- Country: United States
- Language: English
- Box office: $59 million

The Truth About Cats & Dogs is a 1996 American romantic comedy film directed by Michael Lehmann and written by Audrey Wells. It stars Janeane Garofalo, Uma Thurman, Ben Chaplin and Jamie Foxx. The story is a modern reinterpretation of the 1897 Cyrano de Bergerac story and follows Abby Barnes, a veterinarian and radio talk show host who asks her model friend Noelle Slusarsky to impersonate her when Brian, a handsome man, shows interest in her. The original music score was composed by Howard Shore. The Truth About Cats & Dogs was released by 20th Century Fox on April 26, 1996. Upon its release, the film garnered positive reviews and was met with considerable box office success.

== Plot ==
Abby Barnes is a veterinarian and host of a radio show called The Truth About Cats and Dogs. Photographer Brian calls into her show for advice, and unexpectedly sends her a gift and calls her at work to ask her out; she agrees to meet. Her insecurity about her appearance leads her to lie to him over the phone and describe herself with the physical features of her neighbor Noelle Slusarsky. She stands him up. After intervening in an argument between Noelle and her abusive boyfriend Roy, the two women become friends. Brian shows up unexpectedly at Abby's work at the same time as Noelle, and Abby convinces her to pretend she is Abby.

Abby adopts the persona of Donna, friend to Noelle (posing as Abby) and the two begin spending time with Brian together. They invent a story that Abby uses a different voice on the radio than in real life. He is physically attracted to Noelle, but notices that "Abby" has a distinctly different (and decidedly less intellectual) personality in person than on the radio and phone. When he calls the real Abby to ask her out again, he asks her to use her "radio voice" and the two spend nearly seven hours on the phone getting to know one another.

The two women decide to tell Brian the truth by way of Noelle showing up at his home while Abby is live on the radio, but when Noelle arrives, she is entranced by the many kind things he says about her personality and intelligence (even though he is actually talking about Abby). She fails to tell him the truth, which nearly causes a rift between the women, but ultimately Noelle realizes that flattery about someone else may feel good in the moment but is not authentic. She takes a two-week modeling gig out of town in order to put space between herself and Brian.

Noelle returns and tells Brian to make a list of the things he loves about Abby, and to meet at Abby's apartment that night. He does, and reads the list to "Donna". The first few things on the list are about Noelle's appearance, but then the list evolves into more important things about Abby that Brian has truly fallen in love with. He professes his love through the bathroom door thinking "Abby" is bathing inside, but gets no response. He then notices flyers for a charity event Abby is attending, complete with her photo, and realizes the truth.

Abby later approaches Brian at his bar, apologizing for her deceit and explains what really happened. Although initially dismissive, he eventually meets with Abby again and admits he has fallen for her and was only attracted to Noelle because of their deception. He suggests they start again, and Abby happily agrees.

== Cast ==
- Uma Thurman as Noelle Slusarsky
- Janeane Garofalo as Dr. Abby Barnes
- Ben Chaplin as Brian
- Jamie Foxx as Ed
- James McCaffrey as Roy
- Richard Coca as Eric
- Stanley DeSantis as Mario
- Mitch Rouse as Bee Man
- David Cross as Male Radio Caller
- Mary Lynn Rajskub as Female Radio Caller (voice)
- Bob Odenkirk as Bookstore Man
- Linda Porter as Newscaster
- Robin Williams as Second Radio Caller (uncredited voice)

== Themes ==
Screenwriter Audrey Wells said she was inspired by the 1897 play Cyrano de Bergerac by Edmond Rostand and wanted to modernize it by flipping the genders of the original characters. In this version, Abby Barnes (Janeane Garofalo) is the talented but "ugly" Cyrano de Bergerac, Noelle Slusarsky (Uma Thurman) is Christian de Neuvillette and Brian (Ben Chaplin) is Roxane.

Commenting on the ugly-versus-beautiful theme, Thurman said, "We probably keep going back to that idea because there's a whole industry that needs to sell a lot of products that wants us to think that the outside is the important part. There's a war going on. The inside's not as commercial as the outside. People are so affected by how they're received in the world, and some or all of our first experiences are based on how we're externally judged. The conflict between the inner and the outer is a constant battle everybody experiences on lots of levels."

In a retrospective essay for Den of Geek, Aliya Whiteley wrote one of the film's distinguishing factors from other variations of the Cyrano story is that it gives as much importance to the friendship between the two main female characters as it does to the romantic plotline.

== Reception ==
The film received positive reviews from critics. It has an 85% "fresh" rating at Rotten Tomatoes from 47 reviews. The site's consensus states: "Sharp, witty, and charming, The Truth About Cats & Dogs features a standout performance from Janeane Garofalo."

Writing for The Baltimore Sun, Stephen Hunter said, "The movie, which takes as its subject the difficulty of cats and dogs living together, or at least getting together, is as good a romantic comedy as has come this way in a long time." The Hartford Courant said, "Garofalo shows comic flair, deft timing, surprising depth."

Roger Ebert noted the film "is not simply another version of the old [Cyrano] story, since it includes a lot of humor that is generated by its specific situation." Of Garofalo, Ebert wrote in comparison to her roles in Bye Bye Love and Reality Bites, "Here we see an entire other side to her personality; a smartness, a penetrating wit, that takes this old story and adds a wry spin to its combination of romance, sweetness and hope." Of Uma Thurman, Ebert wrote, "She does not simply become a pawn, a false front for Abby. There is a poignance in her situation, because she loves Brian, too, in her way, and handles a difficult situation with unexpected sweetness."

Many reviewers criticized the idea that Garofalo's character was expected to be viewed as unattractive, finding it unrealistic due to the actress's natural beauty.

Although the film was a decent commercial success, in later years, Garofalo expressed dissatisfaction with the film:

I think it's soft and corny, and the soundtrack makes you want to puke, and everybody's dressed in Banana Republic clothing. The original script and the original intent was very different than what it wound up being when it became a studio commercial film. It was originally supposed to be a small-budget independent film where there would be much more complexity to all the characters, and Abby and the guy don't wind up together at the end.

Several years after the film's release, Garofalo became an actual radio talk show host when she cohosted The Majority Report on Air America from 2004 to 2006.

=== Box office ===
The film opened to $6.77 million in its opening weekend, nearly tying the Jean-Claude Van Damme film The Quest which took in $7.03 million. The film was in the No. 2 spot at the United States box office for three consecutive weeks. It grossed $34.9 million in the United States and Canada and $24 million overseas for a worldwide total of $59 million.

== Soundtrack ==
The Truth About Cats & Dogs

Soundtrack album by Various Artists
- Released: April 2, 1996
- Recorded: 1995
- Genre: Soundtrack
- Length: 51:15
- Label: A&M
- Producer: Howard Shore

Professional ratings
Review scores
Source	Rating
AllMusic	3/5 stars

The Truth About Cats & Dogs is the soundtrack from the 1996 film The Truth About Cats & Dogs, released by A&M Records in 1996. The album features a variety of music such as rock, R&B and pop.

The Truth About Cats & Dogs: Original Motion Picture Soundtrack
No.	Title	Length
1.	"For Once in My Life" (Dionne Farris)	3:24
2.	"Caramel" (Suzanne Vega)	2:55
3.	"The Bed's Too Big Without You" (Sting)	6:04
4.	"Angel Mine" (Cowboy Junkies)	4:00
5.	"This Road" (Squeeze)	3:12
6.	"Give It Everything" (Al Green)	4:58
7.	"I Can’t Imagine" (Aaron Neville)	3:58
8.	"Run-Around" (Blues Traveler)	4:40
9.	"Well I Lied" (Robert Cray Band)	2:50
10.	"Where Do I Begin" (Jill Sobule)	2:40
11.	"You Do Something to Me" (Paul Weller)	3:38
12.	"World Keep Spinning" (The Brand New Heavies)	4:58
13.	"Bad Idea" (Ben Folds Five)	1:55
14.	"Cats & Dogs" (Howard Shore)	2:03
Total length:		51:15
