= Columbus Didn't Discover Us =

1992 documentary film

- Retrospective promotional poster
- Directed by: Robbie Leppzer
- Edited by: Felix Atencio-Gonzales; Robbie Leppzer
- Production company: Turning Tide Productions
- Release date: 1992
- Running time: 24 minutes
- Country: United States
- Languages: English; Spanish

Columbus Didn't Discover Us is a 1992 American short documentary film directed and co-edited by Robbie Leppzer. It was filmed at the First Continental Conference on 500 Years of Indian Resistance in Quito, Ecuador, in 1990.

Columbus Didn't Discover Us screened on May 16, 1992, in Deerfield, Massachusetts, as part of an exhibition titled 1492–1992: Many Voices Many Views. The exhibition coincided with the Columbus Quincentenary, the 500th anniversary of the first of the voyages of Christopher Columbus.

== Home media ==
Columbus Didn't Discover Us had its first home media release on VHS. In 2020, the film was remastered in HD and released online with a newly added 6-minute opening montage of protesters taking down statues of Christopher Columbus.
