= Sweethearts (1997 film) =

- Original release poster
- Directed by: Aleks Horvat
- Written by: Aleks Horvat
- Produced by: Janeane Garofalo
- Starring: Janeane Garofalo; Mitch Rouse; Margaret Cho; Bobcat Goldthwait
- Release date: 1997
- Running time: 83 minutes
- Country: United States
- Language: English

Sweethearts is a 1997 American independent film written and directed by Aleks Horvat and starring Janeane Garofalo and Mitch Rouse. The supporting cast features Margaret Cho and Bobcat Goldthwait as well as a cameo appearance by singer/guitarist Stephen Malkmus of the band Pavement.

== Plot ==
Arliss meets Jasmine on a blind date at a coffeehouse, but it turns out Jasmine is bipolar, is carrying a gun, and is contemplating suicide.

Jasmine introduces herself to Arliss as "Emily", a fake character she created to pretend she is not his date. She pretends to be somebody else that went to the same coffee shop.

Eventually Arliss discovers that she is his date pretending to be another person and he gets mad. She forces him to stay by holding a gun in front of his face. Jasmine confesses that the gun is for her, because she is going to commit suicide tomorrow morning on her 31st birthday.

The reason why she wants to commit suicide is because she is a manic bipolar depressive and she feels she can't live any longer with the condition and is suffering psychological pain.

In the middle of the drama, Arliss starts feeling love for Jasmine instead of hating her for pointing a gun at him.

== Cast ==
Janeane Garofalo ... Jasmine
Mitch Rouse ... Arliss
Margaret Cho ... Noreen
Bobcat Goldthwait ... Charles
Van Quattro ... Officer Carter
Buckley Norris ... Asylum patron
Vinnie Bilancio ... Officer Felliciano
Stephen Malkmus ... Coffee House Singer
Debby Barkan ... Girl in Floral Dress
Patricia Peralta ... Girl in Shop Window
Dayna West ... Girl in Black
