= Geoffrey Baer =

American television host

- Born: Geoffrey Baer; 1956 (age 69–70)
- Education: Miami University and Northwestern University
- Occupations: Television personality, writer, producer
- Years active: Early 1990s–present

Geoffrey Baer is an American television personality, writer, and producer best known for hosting the 10 That Changed America series, the Chicago By Boat architecture series, and other television programs produced by WTTW in Chicago for Illinois PBS stations. His programs offer an enhanced understanding of the history, culture, and people of the Chicago area as well as American architecture.

== Early life ==
Born in 1956, Baer was raised in the Chicago suburbs of Highland Park and Deerfield. Baer's father was an accountant while his mother worked as a music and art teacher. His family is of Eastern European Jewish ancestry. Baer recalls one prophetic childhood moment in which his Russian/Yiddish grandmother, grasping his face in her hands, proclaimed that he would be on television someday. Baer was involved in theater in high school, and he majored in radio, television and film at Miami University.

== Career ==
After graduating from college, Baer worked at various television stations in Cincinnati, Saginaw, Michigan, and Philadelphia, eventually becoming a staff producer of a nightly television show in Philadelphia. Returning to school at Northwestern University’s School of Communication, Baer earned a master's degree in theater, and then taught theater part-time for five years at a small, private high school called the Chicago Academy for the Arts. He also became a volunteer docent for the Chicago Architecture Foundation and led boat tours of the Chicago River.

=== Work with WTTW ===
In 1989, Baer began working for WTTW Chicago as an associate producer for arts programs while continuing to lead Chicago Architecture Foundation boat tours on the weekends. In 1995, the newly-appointed chairman of WTTW took one such tour and approached Baer afterward. According to Baer, "By the time I got to work the next day, he’d called the station and said we should make the tour a TV show." His first show, Chicago By Boat, became so popular that it was updated in 2006. By then, Baer had hosted more than 20 programs highlighting Chicago area architecture and history. Today, Baer's programs often accompany pledge drives for WTTW because pledges tend to increase during Baer's programs or when DVDs of his programs are offered as gifts in exchange for pledges. Baer often serves as host for these pledge shows.

== Personal life ==
Baer lives in Evanston, Illinois with his family. In his free time, he enjoys competitive sailing.

== Filmography ==
Film
Year	Title	Role	Notes
1995, 2017	The Chicago River Tour with Geoffrey Baer	Host	
2001	Chicago by 'L'	Host	
2002	Chicago's North Shore	Host	
2003	South of Chicago: Suburbs, Steel Mills, Shoreline	Host	
2005	7 Wonders of Chicago	Host	
2006	Chicago By Boat: The New River Tour	Host	
2006	Northwest of Chicago: From Farm Fields to Boomtowns with Geoffrey Baer	Host	
2007	Foods of Chicago: A Delicious History	Host	
2007	Southwest Suburbs: Birthplace of Chicago	Host	
2008	Chicago's Lakefront	Host	
2008	Chicago's Western Suburbs: From Prairie Soil to Prairie Style	Host	
2009	Hidden Chicago	Host	
2009	Hidden Chicago 2	Host	
2010	10 Buildings That Changed America	Host	
2010	Biking the Boulevards with Geoffrey Baer	Host	
2010	Fox River Valley and Chain O'Lakes	Host	
2010	Seven Wonders of Chicago with Geoffrey Baer	Host	
2011	Chicago's Loop: A New Walking Tour	Host	
2011	Chicago Stories: The Race to Mackinac	Host	
2013	Chicago Time Machine	Host	
2013	Golden Apple Awards for Excellence In Teaching '13	Host	
2014	Where in Chicago?	Host	
2015	Chicago's South Side	Host	
2015	2015 Golden Apple Awards For Excellence In Teaching	Host	
2016	Navy Pier: A Century of Reinvention	Host	
2016	10 Homes That Changed America	Host	
2016	10 Parks That Changed America	Host	
2016	10 Towns That Changed America	Host	
2017	Weekend in Havana	Host	
2018	10 Streets That Changed America	Host	
2018	10 Monuments That Changed America	Host	
2018	10 Modern Marvels That Changed America	Host	
2018	Portraits in Architecture	Host	
2019	Chicago on Vacation with Geoffrey Baer	Host	
2020	Chicago by 'L'	Host	
2020	Chicago from the Air	Host	
2021	The Great Chicago Quiz Show	Host	
2021	Beyond Chicago from the Air	Host	
2022	The Great Chicago Quiz Show 2	Host	
2023	The Most Beautiful Places in Chicago	Host	
2023	The Most Beautiful Places in Chicago 2	Host	
2024	Chicago Mysteries	Host	
2024	A Celebration of Hanukkah	Host	
2025	Touring Chicago's Lakefront	Host	
2025	Chicago Works	Host	
2026	Riding the Rails with Geoffrey Baer	Host	
2026	Chicago’s Northern Suburbs with Geoffrey Baer	Host	
