= David Pasquesi =

American actor and comedian (born 1960)

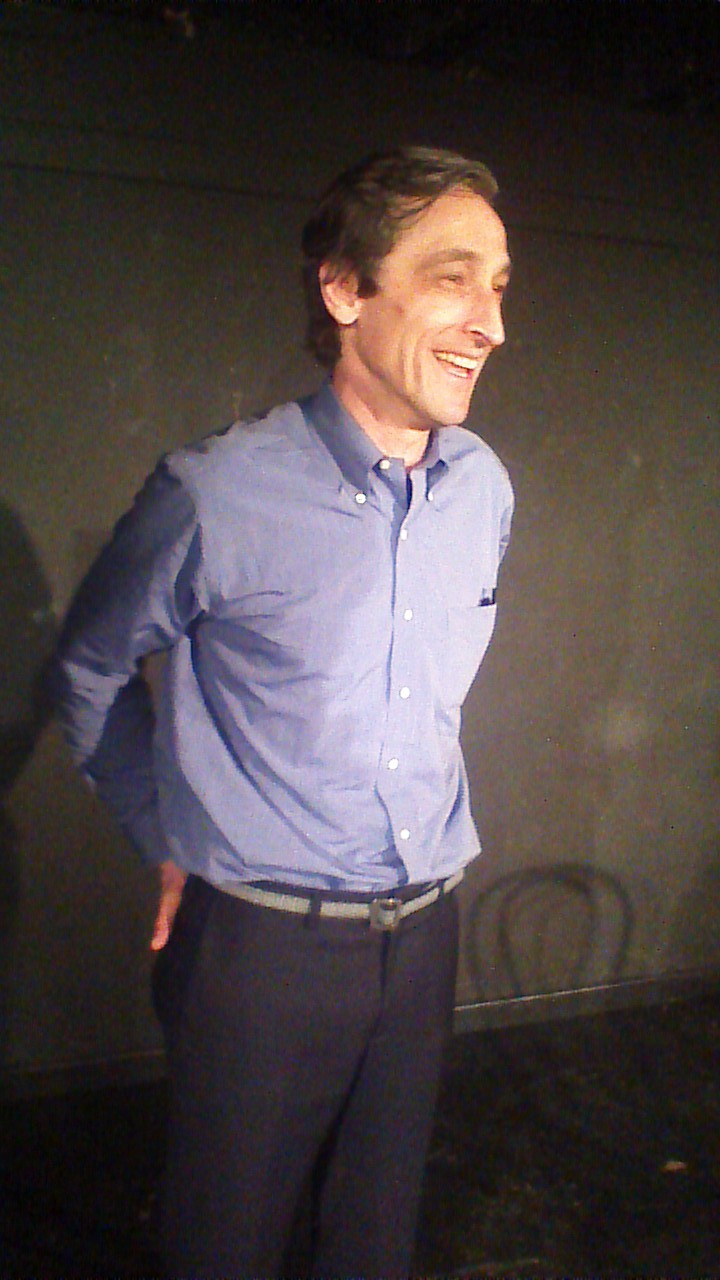
- David Pasquesi on stage after a show at iO Chicago in April 2013.
- Born: December 22, 1960 (age 65); Chicago, Illinois, U.S.
- Occupations: Actor; comedian
- Years active: 1983–present

David Pasquesi (born December 22, 1960) is an American actor and comedian. His screen credits include Father of the Bride (1991), Common Law (1996), Strangers with Candy (1999), The Watcher (2000), Employee of the Month (2004), According to Jim (2005), The Beast (2009), Boss (2011), Chicago Fire (2013), and Lodge 49 (2018)

== Early life ==
Pasquesi, who is of Italian heritage, was born in Chicago and raised in Lake Bluff, Illinois. He graduated from Lake Forest High School.

== Career ==
Pasquesi starred in the short film Regrets that premiered An Event Apart, and co-starred in I Want Someone to Eat Cheese With. He wrote for Exit 57 and Strangers with Candy, co-wrote and appeared in the Spike TV series Factory, and co-wrote and co-starred in Cop Show. In 2009, he was in the cast of Angels & Demons, where he played the character Claudio Vincenzi. He co-created and co-wrote the new show Merkin Penal. Similar to his role of "Meat Man Stew" in Strangers With Candy, Pasquesi plays "Knife Man" in At Home with Amy Sedaris.

Pasquesi has performed at The Second City, iO Theater, Improv Institute, and Annoyance Theatre. He studied under Del Close in the early 80s, and became part of the first iO Harold team "Baron's Barracudas". He appeared in four mainstage revues at Second City, as well as in plays at the Steppenwolf Theatre and the Goodman Theatre.

In 2009, he played a supporting role in the Harold Ramis film Year One as the Prime Minister of Sodom. Pasquesi was a cast member in the Chicago premiere of Yasmina Reza's God of Carnage at the Goodman Theatre.

=== TJ and Dave ===
Since 2002, he has been performing with T. J. Jagodowski in the all improvised show "TJ and Dave". In 2006, they began an Off Broadway run, performing monthly at The Barrow Street Theatre in New York City. The Chicago Reader has described the show as "an hour of subtle character development, verbal facility, and pantomimic agility that anticipates and plays off the audience's reactions." Guests of the show include August: Osage County's Tracy Letts, Academy Award Nominee Michael Shannon, SNL's Mike O'Brien, and Absinthe's Jet Eveleth. The 2009 South by Southwest Film Festival included the documentary Trust Us, This is All Made Up directed by Alex Karpovsky, which chronicles a "T.J. and Dave" performance.

== Filmography ==
=== Film ===
Year	Title	Role	Notes
1987	Light of Day	Sophomore	
1991	Heaven Is a Playground	Hospital clerk	
1991	Father of the Bride	Hanck, the Caterer	
1993	Groundhog Day	Psychiatrist	
1993	The Fugitive	Newscaster	
1994	Natural Born Killers	Cameraman	Uncredited
1994	The Puppet Masters	Vargas	
1995	Stuart Saves His Family	Tollefson	
1996	Chain Reaction	Al Vanzetti	
1998	Temporary Girl	Paul, Jeanette's Husband	
2000	Return to Me	Tony	
2000	The Watcher	Norton	
2002	Joshua	Eli Cohen	
2003	Nobody Knows Anything!	Jimmy	
2004	Employee of the Month	Kyle Lacopa	
2005	Strangers with Candy	Stew	
2005	The Ice Harvest	Councilman Williams	
2006	I Want Someone to Eat Cheese With	Luca Giancarlo	
2008	Leatherheads	Voiceover Announcer	
2009	Tapioca	Lothario	
2009	Angels & Demons	Claudio Vincenzi	
2009	Year One	Prime Minister	
2010	Something Better Somewhere Else	Boss	
2011	The Moleman of Belmont Avenue	Dave the Hermit	
2012	To Rome with Love	Tim	
2012	Close Quarters	Cary	
2013	Hell Baby	Cardinal Vicente	
2015	This Isn't Funny	Christoffer Anderson	
2015	Bloomin Mud Shuffle	Fr. Tony	
2015	Open Tables	Dean Ponder	
2017	Kings	Howard	
2018	Imperfections	Rod	
2020	Monuments	Jim	
2021	Later Days	DJ Shades	
2022	Last Looks	Darius Jamshidi	
2023	Le proprietà dei metalli	Prof. Moretti	
2024	All Happy Families	Jerry	
2025	Death of a Unicorn	Pilot	

=== Television ===
Year	Title	Role	Notes
1990	Dear John	Smoke-Ender	Episode: "True Confessions"
1990	Men Will Be Boys	Tom	Television film
1991	Dream On	Alex	Episode: "To Have and Have and Have and Have Not"
1994	The Shaggy Dog	Officer Hanson	Television film
1996	Common Law	Henry Beckett	5 episodes
1998	Early Edition	Orville	Episode: "A Horse Is a Horse"
1999–2000	Strangers with Candy	Stew	4 episodes
2002	Curb Your Enthusiasm	Dr. Blore	Episode: "Chet's Shirt"
2003	Undeclared	Professor Beyser	Episode: "God Visits"
2003	Hi Guys	Tommy	Television film
2005	According to Jim	Dave	2 episodes
2008	Factory	Smitty	6 episodes
2009	The Beast	Dr. Warren Shelby	Episode: "The Walk In"
2011–2012	Boss	Jack Bentley	5 episodes
2012	Breaking the News	Todd Strait	Television film
2012–2013	The Mob Doctor	Dr. Ian Flanigan	9 episodes
2013–2019	Chicago Fire	Erik McAuley / McAuley	3 episodes
2013–2019	Veep	Andrew Meyer	15 episodes
2015	Cop Drama	Mayor	Television film
2016	The Jamz	Kasey	4 episodes
2016	Easy	Dave	Episode: "Art and Life"
2017	Special Skills	Casting Director	Episode: "Party Animals"
2017	Shrink	Pastor Kaine	Episode: "Cool Ranch"
2017, 2018	Superior Donuts	Lou	2 episodes
2017–2020	At Home with Amy Sedaris	Tony Pugnalata	10 episodes
2018	Empire	Beekman Poser	Episode: "Fair Terms"
2018	Bobcat Goldthwait's Misfits & Monsters	Carol	Episode: "Devil in the Blue Jeans"
2018	Madam Secretary	Prime Minister Enzo Moretti	Episode: "The Magic Rake"
2018–2019	Lodge 49	Blaise St. John	20 episodes
2020	The Conners	Cyril	Episode: "Bridge Over Troubled Conners"
2020	Inferno	Leonard Gregory	Television film
2021–2022	The Book of Boba Fett	Mok Shaiz's majordomo	5 episodes
2022	She-Hulk: Attorney at Law	Craig Hollis / Mr. Immortal	Episode: "Just Jen"
2022	White House Plumbers	James Jesus Angleton	1 episode
