= Jay Leggett =

American actor, comedian and director

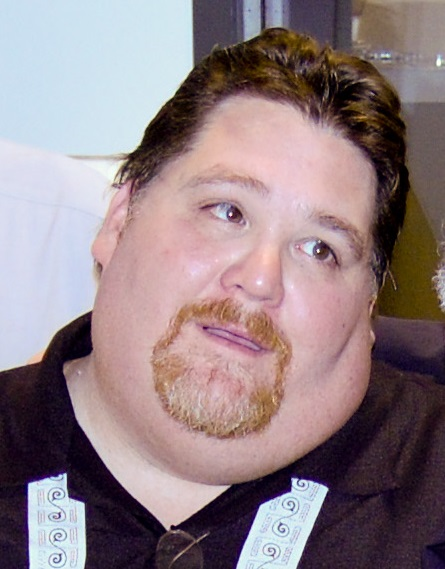
Jay Leggett in 2008

Jay Michael Leggett (August 9, 1963 – November 23, 2013) was an American actor, improvisational comedian, producer, director, and screenwriter.

== Biography ==
Leggett was born in Tomahawk, Wisconsin, and graduated from Tomahawk High School; he then received his bachelor's degree in fine arts from the University of Wisconsin–Stevens Point.

He began his career in Chicago studying with improv legend Del Close before moving to Hollywood to join the cast of the Fox TV series In Living Color. Leggett has appeared on dozens of national TV programs including the pilot for the NBC series E.R.. He wrote, costarred, and produced the feature film Employee of the Month, starring Matt Dillon and Christina Applegate. That film was an official selection to The Sundance Film Festival. Leggett also wrote the Paramount Pictures feature film Without A Paddle starring Dax Shepard and Seth Green. He also produced and starred in the Spike TV series Factory, and produced and directed the documentary To The Hunt, which gave viewers a look into hunting culture through the stories of several different hunting shacks in Lincoln County, Wisconsin.

Leggett died of a heart attack on November 23, 2013, at the age of 50, after a day of hunting in the town of Tomahawk, Lincoln County, Wisconsin.

Leggett directed Live Nude Girls, released August 19, 2014.
