= Phyllis Joffe =

American radio and television producer

- Born: 1943 or 1944
- Died: August 17, 2002 (aged 58); Astoria, New York, US
- Occupations: Radio producer; television producer; journalist

Phyllis Joffe (1943/1944 – August 17, 2002) was an American radio and television producer, journalist and educator. She was a regular contributor to the NPR programs Morning Edition, All Things Considered, and Weekend Edition. She taught journalism at Columbia University Graduate School of Journalism in New York City, as well as at Wesleyan University and Quinnipiac University in Connecticut.

Joffe managed the video production company Video NewsReal, through which she co-produced and co-directed the 1978 documentary film Seabrook 1977 with Robbie Leppzer. From 1994 until her death, she co-produced radio poetry readings and interviews for the Connecticut-based Sunken Garden Poetry Festival, alongside writer Nancy Cobb and sound technician David Budries.

== Education ==
She graduated from Temple University in Philadelphia, Pennsylvania, and earned a master's degree in child psychology from Southern Connecticut State University.

== Death ==
Joffe died on August 17, 2002, in Astoria, New York, from cardiac arrhythmia.
