= Seabrook 1977 =

- Genre: Documentary
- Directed by: Robbie Leppzer; Phyllis Joffe
- Country of origin: United States
- Original language: English

Production
- Producers: Robbie Leppzer; Phyllis Joffe
- Editor: Robbie Leppzer
- Running time: 80 minutes
- Production company: Video NewsReal

Original release
- Release: November 15, 1978

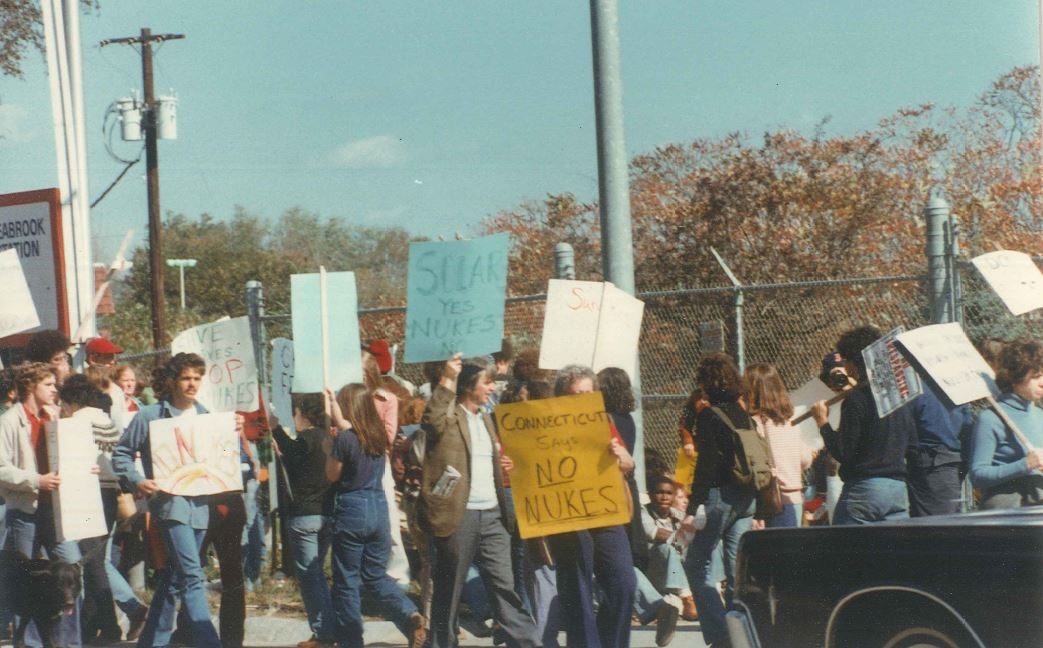
Protesters at Seabrook

Seabrook 1977 is a 1978 American documentary film directed and produced by Robbie Leppzer and Phyllis Joffe. The film chronicles the anti-nuclear protests organized by the Clamshell Alliance against the construction of the Seabrook Station Nuclear Power Plant in Seabrook, New Hampshire, in 1977; over 2,000 protesters occupied the construction site, and 1,414 were arrested and jailed in National Guard armories for two weeks.

The documentary features interviews with anti-nuclear activists, as well as local residents, police and National Guard officers, and then-governor of New Hampshire Meldrim Thomson Jr.. It premiered on the Center for Community Access Television (CCATV) cable television Channel 3 in Amherst, Massachusetts, on November 18, 1978, and was broadcast on PBS on March 20, 1979.

== Reception ==
Rob Wilson Okun, one of the demonstrators arrested during the protests, wrote a review of the film for the Valley Advocate Amherst in which he commended the film's presentation of the protesters, and called it "a powerful document which should stand up well over the years. Gil Scott-Heron to the contrary, the revolution is being televised."
