= Without a Paddle =

2004 film by Steven Brill

- Theatrical release poster
- Directed by: Steven Brill
- Screenplay by: Jay Leggett; Mitch Rouse
- Story by: Harris Goldberg; Tom Nursall; Fred Wolf
- Produced by: Donald De Line
- Starring: Seth Green; Matthew Lillard; Dax Shepard; Abraham Benrubi; Ethan Suplee; Burt Reynolds
- Cinematography: Jonathan Brown
- Edited by: Debra Neil-Fisher; Peck Prior
- Music by: Christophe Beck
- Production company: De Line Pictures
- Distributed by: Paramount Pictures
- Release date: August 20, 2004
- Running time: 99 minutes
- Country: United States
- Language: English
- Budget: $19 million
- Box office: $73 million

Without a Paddle is a 2004 American adventure comedy film directed by Steven Brill, written by Jay Leggett and Mitch Rouse, and based on a story by Harris Goldberg, Tom Nursall, and Fred Wolf. The film stars Seth Green, Matthew Lillard, Dax Shepard, Ethan Suplee, Abraham Benrubi, Rachel Blanchard, Christina Moore, Bonnie Somerville, Ray Baker, and Burt Reynolds. It tells the story of three reunited childhood friends going on a trip up a remote river in order to search for the loot of long-lost airplane hijacker D. B. Cooper.

Without a Paddle was released by Paramount Pictures on August 20, 2004. The film received mostly negative reviews from critics and grossed $73 million against a $19 million budget. A direct-to-video sequel, entitled Without a Paddle: Nature's Calling, was released in January 2009.

== Plot ==
Twelve years after graduating from high school, three friends—Jerry, Dan, and Tom—learn that their childhood companion Billy has died in a parasailing accident. After the funeral, they return to their old tree house and discover a map leading to the lost treasure of D. B. Cooper, which Billy had spent much of his life researching. Deciding to follow Billy's quest, Dan, a doctor, takes leave from work and joins Jerry and Tom on a canoe trip to search for the treasure.

While camping along the river, the group realizes they forgot food. Tom attempts to catch fish using a flashlight, attracting a grizzly bear that chases them into a tree. The following morning, they find their gear destroyed. Unable to navigate with the damaged map, they miss a river split and accidentally go over a waterfall, destroying their canoe but surviving. As they head through the forest, they stumble upon a marijuana farm run by rednecks Dennis and Elwood. Mistaken for thieves, the trio is shot at and flees, inadvertently setting fire to the crop with flares. Enraged, the farmers vow to hunt them down.

Deep in the woods, after further pursuit, the friends encounter hippie women Flower and Butterfly, who shelter them in their treehouse. When the farmers arrive, the women drive them off by dropping bags of feces. The trio later takes refuge with a mountain hermit, who provides them clothing and reveals himself as Del Knox, Cooper's former partner. When the farmers attack again, Del buys the friends time by holding them off with dual revolvers.

Continuing on, the trio discovers the site of Cooper's crash and finds his skeleton in a cave, along with the empty suitcase used to hold the ransom. They realize Cooper burned the money to stay alive. As Dan crawls through a tunnel seeking an exit, the farmers capture Tom and Jerry. Sheriff Briggs, who had earlier aided the group, appears but reveals himself to be in league with the farmers. Jerry manages to use a grenade taken from Dennis, toppling a tree that traps the sheriff and the rednecks, who are then arrested.

In the aftermath, Del gives the friends $100,000 of the surviving money. Jerry and Dan allow Tom to keep it, believing he needs it most. Jerry proposes to his girlfriend Denise, Dan begins a relationship with Flower, and Tom becomes a summer camp counsellor, entertaining children with an embellished version of their adventure. Meanwhile, Del departs to give Cooper a proper burial.

== Cast ==
- Seth Green as Dan Mott
  - Jarred Rumbold as young Dan
- Matthew Lillard as Jerry Conlaine, Dan's friend
  - Andrew Hampton as young Jerry
- Dax Shepard as Tom Marshall, Dan's other friend
  - Matthew Price as young Tom
- Burt Reynolds as Del Knox
- Ethan Suplee as Elwood
- Abraham Benrubi as Dennis
- Rachel Blanchard as Flower, Dan's love interest
- Ray Baker as Hank Briggs
- Bonnie Somerville as Denise, Jerry's girlfriend
- Christina Moore as Butterfly, Flower's friend and Tom's love interest
- Antony Starr as Billy Newwood, Dan's late friend
  - Carl Snell as young Billy
- Liddy Holloway as Bonnie Newwood, Billy's mother
- Scott Adsit as Greasy man
- Danielle Cormack as Toni
- Bart the Bear 2 as Grizzly bear
- Frank Welker as Grizzly bear (vocal effects)

== Reception ==
=== Box office ===
Without a Paddle ranked second in its opening weekend behind fellow newcomer Exorcist: The Beginning, earning $13,528,946. It ultimately grossed $58,169,327 in North America and $14,859,863 internationally, for a worldwide total of $73,029,190.

=== Critical response ===
On Rotten Tomatoes, the film has an approval rating of 15% based on 124 reviews, with an average rating of 3.9/10. The website's critical consensus reads: "Without a Paddle has a few laughs, but not enough to sustain its running time." On Metacritic, the film has a weighted average score of 29 out of 100 based on 27 critics, indicating "generally unfavorable reviews". Audiences surveyed by CinemaScore gave the film an average grade of "B+" on an A+ to F scale.

Dennis Harvey of Variety called it "an unstable—if mostly painless—mix of low comedy, stabs at higher silliness, and schmaltz."

Entertainment Weekly's Scott Brown was more positive and wrote: "There are some genuinely clever moments of physical comedy, and the inevitable crudeness is offset by winning whimsy. Without has all the freshness of moldering Playboys stashed under a mattress, but it evokes what few boys-will-be-boys larks can: chumminess."

== Sequel ==
A sequel to the film, titled Without a Paddle: Nature's Calling, was released direct-to-video on January 14, 2009. None of the cast and crew from the first film returned.

== See also ==
- D. B. Cooper in popular culture
