= John W. McCarter =

John W. McCarter Jr.
- Born: 1938 (age 87–88); Oak Park, Illinois, U.S.
- Education: Princeton University (1960); London School of Economics (1960-1961); Harvard Business School (1963)
- Occupations: Field Museum, Chicago (President & CEO)
- Spouse: Judith Field West
- Children: 3
- Parents: John W. McCarter Sr. (father); Ruth McCarter (mother)

John W. McCarter Jr. (born 1938) is an American business executive and public educator, notable for his long tenure as president and CEO of the Field Museum in Chicago.

== Early life and education ==
Born in Oak Park, Illinois, McCarter is the son of John W. McCarter Sr., and Ruth McCarter. He graduated from Princeton University in 1960. His senior thesis, in the Woodrow Wilson School, was on mayor Richard J. Daley and the Chicago democratic organization. He attended the London School of Economics in 1960-1961 and received an M.B.A. from the Harvard Business School in 1963.

== Business career ==
From 1963, McCarter was with Booz Allen & Hamilton, Inc., consultanting with companies in agriculture, pharmaceuticals, and nutrition, and rising to vice president (1968-1969) McCarter was president of DeKalb Corporation and DeKalb-Pfizer Genetics until asked to resign by the board in 1986. At that time he rejoined Booz Allen, advancing to senior vice president.

== Government service ==
McCarter served as a White House fellow in the Bureau of the Budget in 1966–1967, during the Johnson administration. He directed the Illinois Department of Finance and newly created Bureau of the Budget from 1969 to 1972, under Governor Richard B. Ogilvie.

== Later career ==
Leaving Booz Allen, McCarter served as president and CEO of the Field Museum from 1996 until 2012, during which time McCarter was known for his work to modernize and expand the museum's mission. He has been a trustee of the University of Chicago, a trustee of Princeton University, a member of the Board of Governors of Argonne National Laboratory, a Regent of the Smithsonian Institution, a trustee and chair of Chicago's public television station WTTW, and has been a director or trustee of companies including W.W. Grainger, Janus Funds, and Divergence, Inc.

== Honors and awards ==
McCarter is a Fellow of the American Academy of Arts and Sciences. In 2026, the Chicago History Museum selected him for the Marshall Field Making History Award for Distinction in Corporate Leadership and Innovation.

== Personal life ==
McCarter married Judith Field West in 1965. They have three children.
