= The Peace Patriots =

2005 American documentary film

- Promotional release poster
- Directed by: Robbie Leppzer
- Narrated by: Janeane Garofalo
- Music by: John Sheldon
- Production company: Turning Tide Productions
- Release date: September 22, 2005 (Northampton)
- Running time: 78 minutes
- Country: United States
- Language: English

The Peace Patriots is a 2005 American documentary film directed by Robbie Leppzer about opposition to the Iraq War. Narrated by actress Janeane Garofalo, the film follows students, teachers, clergy, and veterans in Massachusetts as they protest against the US government's 2003 invasion of Iraq, the first stage of the Iraq War.

In addition to original music composed by John Sheldon, The Peace Patriots features music by Billy Bragg, Jonatha Brooke, Ani DiFranco, Steve Earle, Pete Seeger, Stephan Smith, and Saul Williams. A work-in-progress version of the film was screened on September 27, 2004, at Greenfield Community College in Greenfield, Massachusetts. The finished film premiered on September 22, 2005, at the Calvin Theater in Northampton.
