= Wild Chicago =

Wild Chicago is a television series that aired on Chicago's WTTW (a local PBS affiliate) from 1989 to 2003. The show took viewers on a trip through Chicago's "urban jungle", highlighting hundreds of offbeat and unusual people, places, and events in the metropolitan area. Subjects included the Chicago Herpetological Society; singing taxicab drivers; flotation tanks; an Ancient Astronaut society; the Inkin' Lincoln Tattoo and Piercing Jamboree; an interstate pierogi festival; a squirrel lovers' club; the Playboy Advisor; a cookie jar museum; and the Polka Music Hall of Fame.

Wild Chicago was created by Ben Hollis and John Davies. Davies left after two seasons moving to Los Angeles where he created and executive produced six other national series for networks including NBC, BRAVO, A&E, AMC and MTV. Wild Chicago won numerous local Emmy Awards over the course of its run, as did several of the show's hosts. Emmy Award winners for their individual work include Hollis, the show's original host, and his replacements upon taking an extended hiatus in 1992, Laura Meagher and Will Clinger. After two years, Meagher left the show to work for Fox Television.

After Ben's departure in 1992, Harvey Moshman, the original editor of the series, became the series producer for the remaining 11 seasons. The show continued with Will Clinger as host and a number of "Wild Correspondents". They included local actors Mindy Bell, Cassy Harlo, Tava Smiley, Sarah Vetter, Denise La Grassa, Choky Lim, Aaron Shure, and Dick O'Day (portrayed by Richard Knight Jr.—the show's only correspondent to appear in character). The new slate of correspondents continued to win individual Emmys as did the show itself.

In addition to the regular series, Moshman produced several Road Trip episodes to destinations including Tokyo, The Indy 500, The Kentucky Derby, Atlanta, Hong Kong, Branson, Las Vegas, and The Wisconsin Dells as well as the studio-based "12 on 11" Anniversary Special, an overdue celebration of the show's 10th anniversary, that Clinger emceed. The extravaganza accounts for one of more than a dozen local Emmy awards the show received. The anniversary celebration also featured appearances by Ben Hollis & John Davies and many of the show's unusual performers including Midnight Circus, The Rope Warrior, and Mark Faje-the Human Salad Shooter.

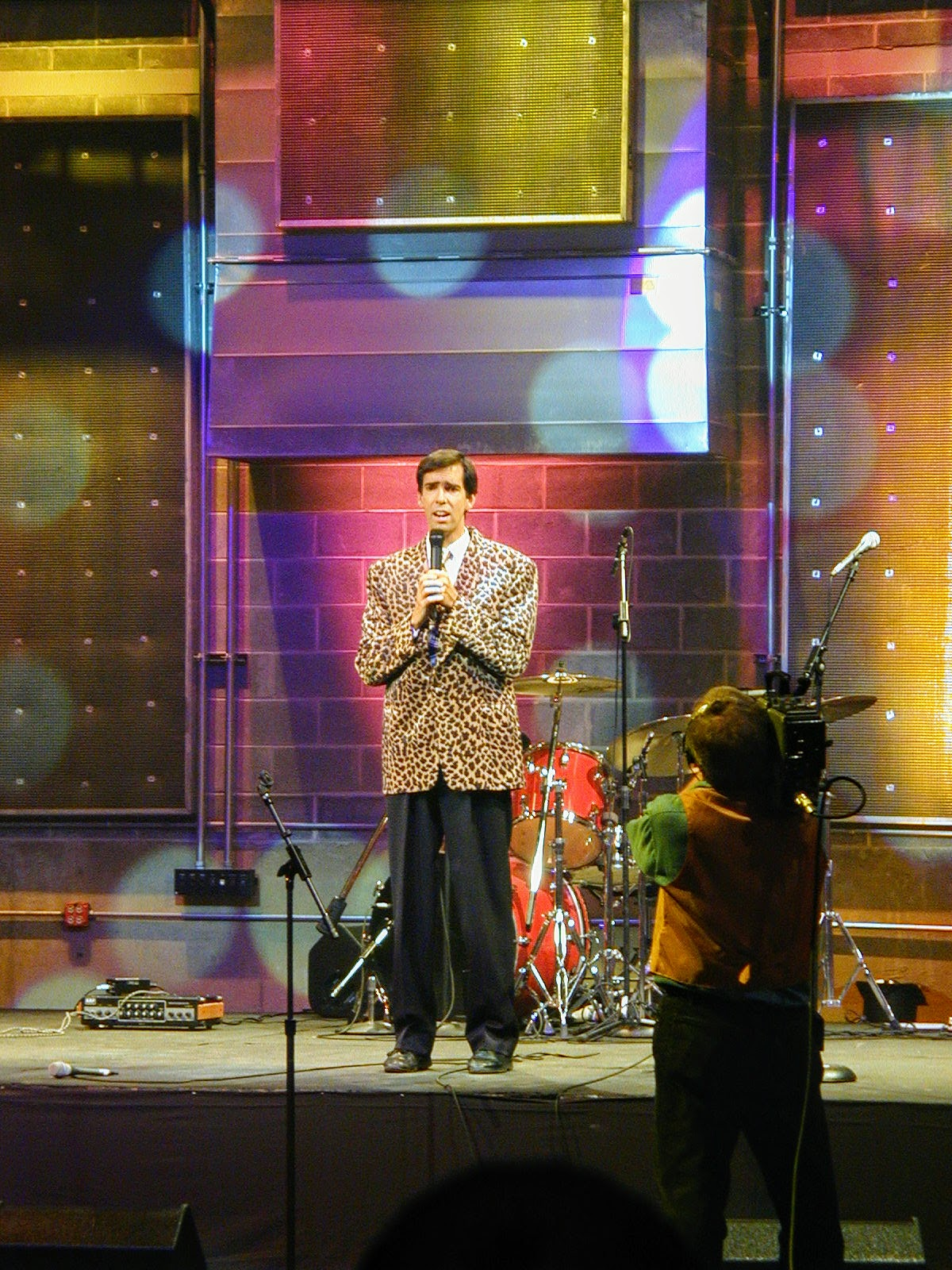
Will Clinger hosting the August 12, 2000 WTTW Wild Chicago "12 on 11" anniversary show.

The series ran continuously for 14 years on WTTW until 2003. After being off the air for over two years, Wild Chicago made a brief return in spring 2006 with a seven-part special called Wild Chicago's Illinois Road Trip. This final incarnation of the show, hosted Ben Hollis and produced by Hollis and cameraman-editor Tom Siegel, featured ghost tours in Alton and a Beatles-themed bed and breakfast in Benton, among other Illinois oddities.

In 1990, a segment of the program entitled Dumb Questions features then-Northwestern University student Stephen Colbert and his friend Paul Dinello.

In 2016, Moshman and Clinger paired up to create Wild Travels, now seen on PBS stations in 170 markets across 49 states and streaming on several platforms. Wild Travels TV
