= The Secret Lives of Men =

- Created by: Susan Harris
- Starring: Peter Gallagher; Bradley Whitford; Mitch Rouse
- Composer: Jonathan Wolff
- Country of origin: United States
- Original language: English
- No. of seasons: 1
- No. of episodes: 13 (6 unaired)

Production
- Executive producers: Paul Junger Witt; Tony Thomas; Susan Harris; Nina Wass; James Burrows
- Camera setup: Multi-camera
- Production companies: Witt/Thomas/Harris Productions; Warner Bros. Television

Original release
- Network: ABC
- Release: September 30 – November 11, 1998

The Secret Lives of Men is an American sitcom that aired on ABC from September 30, 1998 to November 11, 1998. The series aired in full in Ireland on RTÉ2.

== Premise ==
Three divorced men adjusting to the bachelor life. With nothing left but each other, Michael, Phil, and Andy form a club and embark on a new phase of life. Someday, they might comprehend the mysteries of women, love, and golf...until then, they'll continue carrying on The Secret Lives of Men.

== Cast ==
- Peter Gallagher as Michael
- Bradley Whitford as Phil
- Mitch Rouse as Andy
- Sofia Milos as Maria

== Episodes ==
No.	Title	Directed by	Written by	Original release date	Prod. code
1	"Pilot"	James Burrows	Susan Harris	September 30, 1998	001
Michael has dinner with his ex and learns about the secret life of another man.
2	"Phil's Problem"	Jay Sandrich	Susan Harris	October 7, 1998	002
Phil has problems in the bedroom. Andy becomes a local hero by stopping a mugging.
3	"Sex, Lies and Videotape"	Jay Sandrich	Susan Harris	October 14, 1998	005
Phil is losing his hair. Andy is being sued for sexual harassment.
4	"Dating is Hell"	Jay Sandrich	Susan Harris	October 21, 1998	004
Andy and Phil suspect that the new woman Michael has been seeing is married.
5	"Mafia Bossy"	Gil Junger	Jill Condon & Amy Toomin	October 28, 1998	003
Phil is dating an Italian girl, who might have connections to the mafia.
6	"The Lump"	Gil Junger	Jill Franklyn	November 4, 1998	010
Phil discovers a lump during a visit to his doctor. Michael is nervous before his first party after the divorce.
7	"Dancing in the Dark"	Ted Wass	John Levenstein	November 11, 1998	011
Andy tells the guys about the time he lost his girlfriend to Bruce Springsteen. Phil meets a lawyer from ESPN who behaves exactly like he does.
8	"An Elephant in the Living Room"	TBD	TBD	Unaired	006
Phil is dating a call girl.
9	"Guessing Games"	TBD	TBD	Unaired	007
Boomer Esiason joins the guys for a game of golf.
10	"The Long Goodbye"	TBD	TBD	Unaired	008
A stalker pursues Michael; Andy learns his ex-wife is dating.
11	"T Day"	TBD	TBD	Unaired	009
The guys spend Thanksgiving at Phil's place.
12	"A Member of the Wedding"	TBD	TBD	Unaired	012
13	"The Bird"	Ted Wass	Susan Harris	Unaired	013
Phil goes on a basketball scouting trip to Europe leaving Mike and Andy to take care of his pet Macaw (Emily), which he's just gotten custody of in his divorce settlement, from his ex-wife Alice. Believing that the bird has fainted Mike and Andy bring it to a vet (Diedrich Bader) who informs them that the bird will not wake up and is in fact dead. Andy sleeps with his ex-wife Wendy, who later admits that she's trying to get pregnant.
