= Employee of the Month (2004 film) =

2004 film by Mitch Rouse

- DVD cover
- Directed by: Mitch Rouse
- Written by: Mitch Rouse; Jay Leggett
- Produced by: Tom Nunan; Cathy Schulman; Bob Yari
- Starring: Matt Dillon; Christina Applegate; Steve Zahn
- Cinematography: John Peters
- Edited by: Hughes Winborne
- Music by: Doug DeAngelis; Kevin Haskins
- Production companies: Bob Yari Productions; Bull's Eye Entertainment
- Distributed by: DEJ Productions
- Release date: October 6, 2006 (Canada)
- Running time: 97 minutes
- Country: United States
- Language: English

Employee of the Month is a 2004 American black comedy film written and directed by Mitch Rouse. The film stars Matt Dillon, Christina Applegate, and Steve Zahn.

== Plot ==
David Walsh is a bank employee whose day begins badly when he gets fired from his dream job and dumped by his fiancée Sara Goodwin the day after their engagement party was crashed by his best friend, Jack. Jack tries to console him by telling him that it's for the best, that David was headed down the wrong path. In a further effort to console him, Jack arranges for a hooker named Whisper to show up at his hotel, but instead she steals his car. The next day, David goes back to the bank with a gun tucked into in his waistband. He surreptitiously makes his way into his former boss's office, where he pulls out the gun and threatens to end his boss's life. Though intimidated, the boss stands up to David, and David, deciding he does not want blood on his hands after all, pistol-whips him instead.

When David emerges from his boss's office, he finds the bank being robbed. A sequence shows him killing the robbers single-handedly, but this is then shown to have been a daydream. When one of the robbers seizes his co-worker Wendy, he shoots the robber and saves her, but he is shot, tackled, and forced into the getaway vehicle, whereupon the robbers make their escape.

A montage shows various people's reactions to the incident, including that of David's ex-fiancée Sara (who is crying uncontrollably), and then a burning van. A reporter announces that dental records have shown that the body found in the van was David's. A complex series of plot twists follows. It turns out that the robbery had actually been part of plan hatched two years previously, by David and his friends Jack, Wendy, and Eric, to rob the bank and fake David's death, erasing his identity so that he would not be caught, and leaving him and his friends filthy rich. Eric, who is Sara's dentist, is revealed to have driven the getaway vehicle and falsified the dental records of the corpse in the van. David, Wendy, and Jack meet up in a motel room, prepared to divide their loot and part ways. When Wendy leaves the room, however, David kills Jack. (It turns out that David had secretly hated Jack ever since Jack scarred David's face and torso extensively in a childhood accident.) Wendy returns and kills David. She grabs the money and runs off to pick up Sara, with whom it turns out she's involved in a romantic relationship. (Sara, for her part, had previously gone to Eric's office, killed him, and taken his share of the money.) After the credits, Sara and Wendy's car is shown being hit by a bus.

== Cast ==
- Matt Dillon as David Walsh
- Steve Zahn as Jack
- Christina Applegate as Sara Goodwin
- Andrea Bendewald as Wendy
- Dave Foley as Eric
- Jenna Fischer as Whisper
- Fiona Gubelmann as Amber
- Lynn Milgrim as Mrs. Chapman
- Peter Jason as Bill Gartin

== Critical response ==
On review aggregator site Rotten Tomatoes, the film has an 11% rating based on 9 reviews.
