= Factory (TV series) =

2008 American television series

- Genre: Comedy
- Created by: Mitch Rouse; Michael Coleman; Jay Leggett; David Pasquesi
- Starring: Mitch Rouse; Michael Coleman; Jay Leggett; David Pasquesi
- Country of origin: United States
- Original language: English
- No. of seasons: 1
- No. of episodes: 6

Production
- Executive producers: John Lynch; Mitch Rouse; Dave Becky; Michael Rotenberg
- Producers: Michael Coleman; Jay Leggett; David Pasquesi
- Production companies: Screamin' Chickens Productions; 3 Arts Entertainment; Devlin Entertainment

Original release
- Network: Spike
- Release: June 29 – August 3, 2008

Factory is an American comedy television series. The series received a six-episode order from Spike, where it premiered on June 29, 2008. The series, produced by 3 Arts Entertainment, was directed by and stars Mitch Rouse, and features fellow comedians Michael Coleman, Jay Leggett and David Pasquesi.

== Plot ==
Factory is the story of four guys who grew up together in the same small town, who drank a lot of beer, and dreamt of one day making a name for themselves. The four guys are still friends and still drink a lot of beer, only now they all work in the town's local factory. When not figuring out new ways to avoid doing their jobs, the guys are usually trying to appease their wives and girlfriends, without great success.

== Characters ==
- Gary (played by Mitch Rouse) – The unspoken leader and ladies' man of the group, Gary has been putting in long days at the factory for years, lately just to get away from his emotionally unstable wife. He epitomizes the classic slacker-underachiever whose wit far outweighs his motivation.
- Smitty (played by David Pasquesi) – Smitty is the sarcastic one of the group, and he fancies himself an intellectual. He currently lives in the same house as his ex-wife, but a glimmer of hope has shined on him in the form of his ex-wife's stepfather's sister's daughter (no relation).
- Gus (played by Jay Leggett) – Gus is currently working up the courage to propose to his live-in girlfriend of 11 years. A big teddy bear of a guy, Gus occasionally manipulates his friends to get what he wants.
- Chase (played by Michael Coleman) – Chase is a naïve 12-year-old in the body of a 35-year-old linebacker, in desperate need of a girlfriend. His naiveté makes him the butt of many jokes, but his friends are always encouraging him to meet women, especially if it means they have the chance to live through him vicariously.

== Episodes ==
No.	Title	Original release date
1	"Pilot"	June 29, 2008
When a deadly accident at work leads to a job opportunity, disaccord spreads amongst the four friends on who should earn the promotion. Their boss leaves it to them to decide on who should climb up the career ladder, so everyone tries to convince the others that he is the right person for the promotion.
2	"The Lemon"	July 6, 2008
Gary buys a new car that turns out to be a "lemon" - it breaks down right after he leaves the sales yard. Unable to get his money back he enlists the help of his friends. In the meantime, Gus wants to propose to his girlfriend.
3	"Drug Test"	July 13, 2008
A bag of marijuana is found on the factory floor. While the factory personnel are interrogated by two specialists, the wives find their own kicks in committing crimes.
4	"Builtgood Screwcutter 5000"	July 20, 2008
A new piece of machinery makes its debut on the factory floor, and Chase promptly cuts his finger off. As he and Gus attempt to woo an attractive nurse, Gary and Smitty decide to goof off around the hospital.
5	"Model Employee"	July 27, 2008
The guys try to look sexy after they learn that one of their peers will be posing for a "Blue Collar Boys" calendar. Meanwhile, Chase gets some advice on how to score with women.
6	"Camping"	August 3, 2008
When it is career day at school, Gary and Smitty are sent to class to tell the kids about being a factory worker, which turns into an embarrassing performance, so the guys decide to do something about it. Meanwhile, Gary's ex-wife Meg has a romantic date.
