= Janeane Garofalo =

American comedian and actress (born 1964)

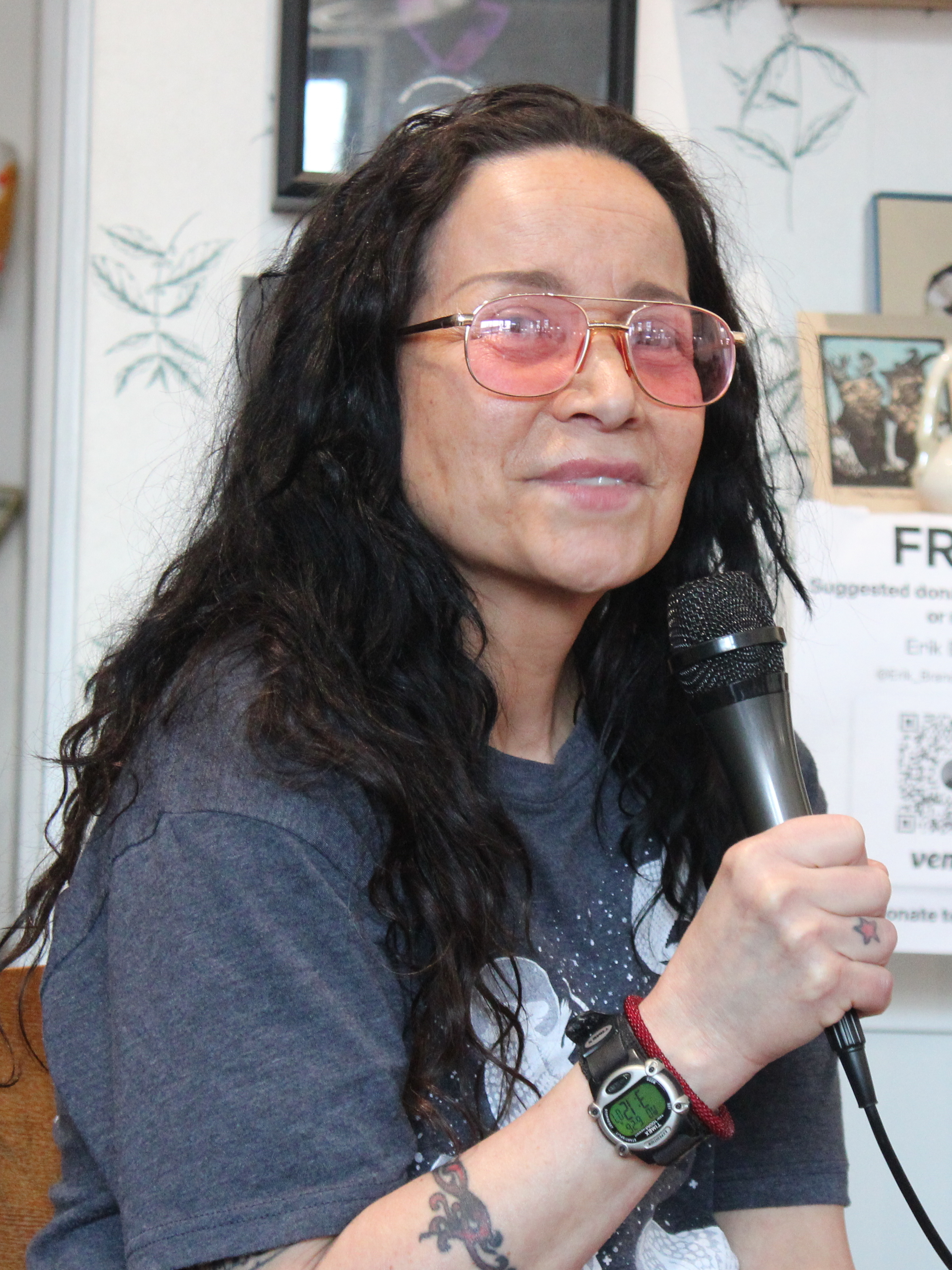
- Garofalo in 2026
- Born: September 28, 1964 (age 62); Newton, New Jersey, U.S.
- Education: Providence College (BA)
- Spouse: Robert Cohen (m. 1992; div. 2012)

Comedy career
- Years active: 1985–present
- Medium: Stand-up; film; television; radio
- Genre: Alternative comedy
- Subjects: American politics; films; feminism; celebrities; body image
- Website: janeanegarofalo.com

Janeane Garofalo (/dʒəˈniːn ɡəˈrɒfəloʊ/ jə-NEEN gə-ROF-əl-oh; born September 28, 1964) is an American comedian and actress. The accolades she has received include nominations for two Primetime Emmy Awards and a Screen Actors Guild Award.

Garofalo began her career as a stand-up comedian and became a cast member on The Ben Stiller Show, The Larry Sanders Show, and Saturday Night Live, then appeared in more than 50 movies, with leading or major roles in The Truth About Cats & Dogs, Wet Hot American Summer, The Matchmaker, Reality Bites, The Wild, Steal This Movie!, Clay Pigeons, Sweethearts, Mystery Men, The Minus Man, The Independent, Ratatouille, and Flora & Ulysses. She has appeared on television programs such as The West Wing, Wet Hot American Summer: First Day of Camp, 24, Girlfriends' Guide to Divorce, and Ideal.

She was the co-host on Air America Radio's The Majority Report from March 2004 until July 2006.

== Early life ==
Garofalo was born in Newton, New Jersey, the daughter of Joan and Carmine Garofalo. Her mother, a secretary in the petrochemical industry, died of cancer when Janeane was 24; her father is a former Exxon executive. Garofalo is of Italian descent. She grew up in various places, including: Ontario, California; Madison, New Jersey, where she attended Madison High School; and Houston, Texas, where she graduated from James E. Taylor High School. Garofalo has said that she disliked life in Houston because of the heat and humidity and the emphasis on prettiness and sports in high school.

While studying history at Providence College, Garofalo entered a comedy talent search sponsored by the Showtime cable network, and won the title of "Funniest Person in Rhode Island." Dreaming of earning a slot on the writing staff of the TV show Late Night with David Letterman, she became a professional standup comic upon graduating from college with degrees in history and American studies. She struggled to make a living for a number of years, working briefly as a bike messenger in Boston.

== Entertainment career ==
=== Stand-up comedy ===
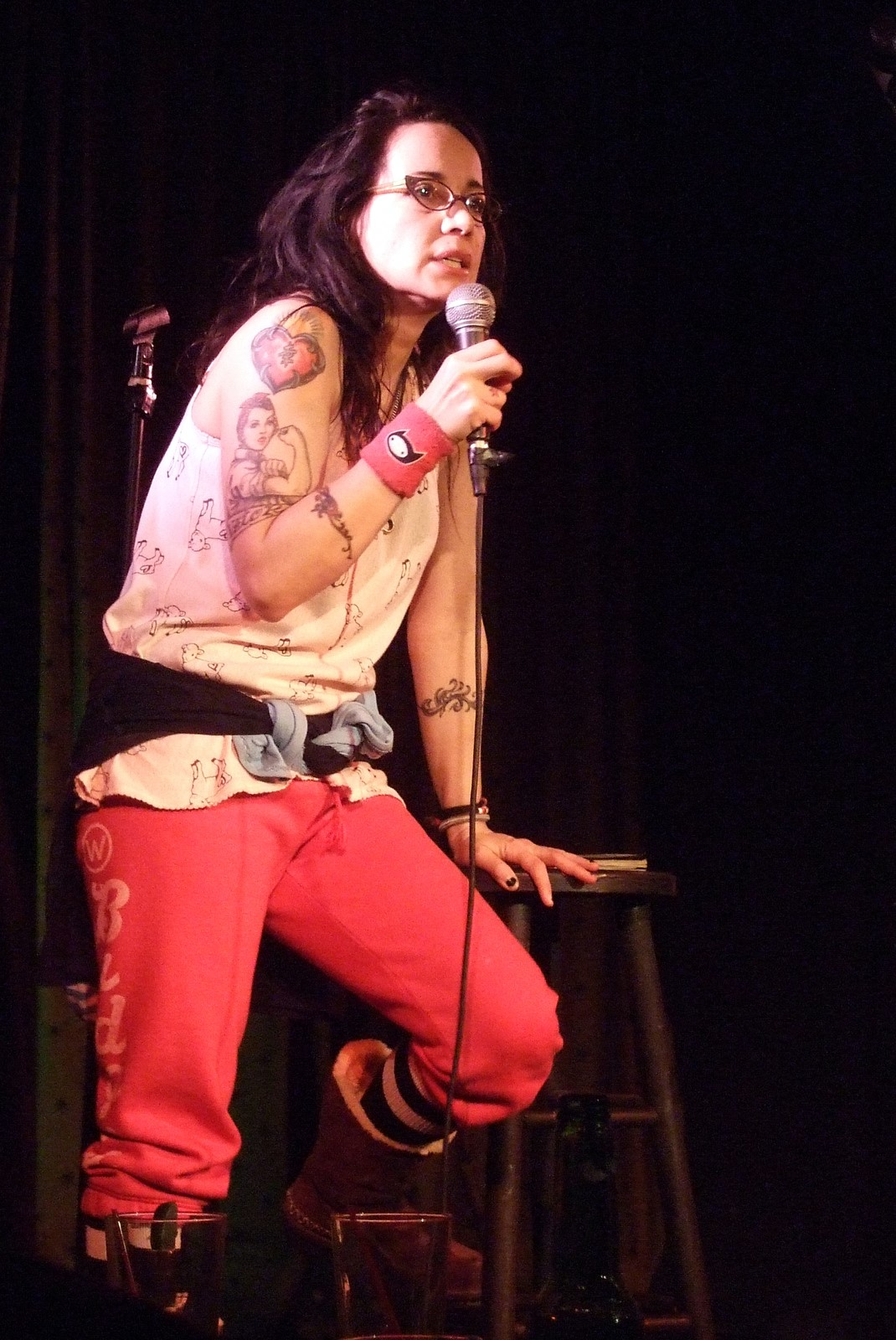
Garofalo performing comedy in 2008

Garofalo began her comedy career in the mid-1980s. Her comedy is often self-deprecating; she has made fun of popular culture and the pressures on women to conform to body image ideals promoted by the media.

When in San Francisco, Garofalo was a frequent guest at the San Francisco Comedy Condo.

Garofalo's comedy shows involve her and her notebook, which is filled with years' worth of article clippings and random observations she references for direct quotes during her act. Garofalo has said that she does not tell jokes as much as make observations designed to get laughs. Upon arriving in LA in the early 1990s, she had difficulty being passed at the mainstream clubs, and when she was passed at The Improv, she often bombed. She was a pioneer of the alternative comedy scene in Los Angeles in the early 1990s, starting the alt-show at Big & Tall Books in LA on August 6, 1991. Garofalo co-created the "Eating It" alternative stand-up comedy show, which ran at Luna Lounge on the Lower East Side of New York City between 1995 and 2005, frequently hosting the show and appearing as a performer.

She appeared on HBO's Comedy Half-Hour and Comedy Hour specials in 1995 and 1997, respectively, among similar subsequent appearances, including a one-hour stand-up special entitled If I May, performed at Seattle's Moore Theatre that aired on Epix in June 2010 and was released on DVD in September 2010.

=== Film career ===
Garofalo has performed a variety of roles in more than 50 feature films, playing leading or large roles in Romy and Michele's High School Reunion, The Truth About Cats & Dogs, I Shot a Man in Vegas, The Matchmaker, Clay Pigeons, Steal This Movie!, Sweethearts, Mystery Men, The Independent, Wet Hot American Summer, Manhood, Ash Tuesday, and Bad Parents.

Her first movie role, filmed the year before she appeared on national television, was a brief comical appearance as a counter worker in a burger joint in Late for Dinner in 1991. Her breakthrough role came in Reality Bites (1994) as Winona Ryder's character's Gap-managing best friend Vickie.

Her further television work and supporting roles in feature films included Bye Bye Love and Now and Then, and a leading role in I Shot a Man in Vegas. In 1996 she was cast in the starring role in the romantic comedy The Truth About Cats & Dogs, a variation on Cyrano de Bergerac, which featured Uma Thurman in the top-billed but smaller role as a beautiful but vapid model, while Garofalo played a highly intelligent radio host. Initially an independent film, it became a studio movie when Thurman joined the project.

Based on the success of that film, a producer offered Garofalo the part of Dorothy Boyd in Jerry Maguire with Tom Cruise if she could lose weight. After trimming down, however, she learned that Renée Zellweger had received the part.

She turned down the role of television reporter Gale Weathers in Wes Craven's Scream because she thought the film would be too violent: "I said I didn't want to be in a movie where a teen girl was disemboweled. I didn't know it turned out so good, and it was a funny movie."

Following up The Truth About Cats and Dogs, Garofalo played the lead role in The Matchmaker, a 1997 romantic comedy film about the misadventures of a cynical American woman who reluctantly visits Ireland; it is Garofalo's first and only lead role to date. That same year, she played a supporting role as a deputy sheriff in the drama Cop Land, a police gangster film starring Sylvester Stallone, Harvey Keitel, Ray Liotta and Robert De Niro. In 1998, she performed her first voice-acting job playing "Ursula the Artist" in Disney's English dub of Studio Ghibli's Kiki's Delivery Service and briefly appeared in Permanent Midnight. In 1999, she starred as "The Bowler" in the film Mystery Men, about an underdog group of super heroes.

In 2000, she portrayed Abbie Hoffman's wife Anita Hoffman opposite Vincent D'Onofrio as Hoffman in Steal This Movie!, involving the couple's political activism during the Vietnam War era. Later that same year, she received second billing under Jerry Stiller in a comedic film about a low-budget movie producer entitled The Independent. The following year, Garofalo was top-billed in Wet Hot American Summer, the 2001 cult comedy about an American summer camp, and starred in The Search for John Gissing.

In 2002, she played Catherine Connolly in The Laramie Project and in 2003, she starred in Manhood and Ash Tuesday, and appeared in the crime film Wonderland. She played a supporting role in Jiminy Glick in Lalawood in 2004.

A puppet version of Garofalo appeared (and was graphically killed off) in the 2004 movie Team America: World Police; while Garofalo was irritated by the parody, she was more upset by the filmmakers' lack of correspondence. "I ran into them in the street, Trey and the other guy, and I said to them, 'The least you could do is send me a puppet.' And they said OK, took my address down ... and never sent me a puppet! So while Team America bothered me, the fact they didn't send me my puppet, that bothered me even more."

In 2005, she played the ex-wife of a man coping with the reverberations of a divorce in Duane Hopwood. In 2006, she performed Bridget the giraffe's voice in the animated Disney feature film The Wild. In 2007, she provided the voice of Colette Tatou, a chef in the Pixar/Disney feature film Ratatouille, in which Garofalo affected a pronounced French accent for the role, appropriate for a character based on a French cook described as the world's best female chef. She made cameo appearances in The Guitar in 2008 and Labor Pains in 2009, and starred in Bad Parents in 2012, a comedy about New Jersey soccer moms obsessing over their children's experiences playing the sport. She starred in the 2015 film 3rd Street Blackout.

=== Television career ===
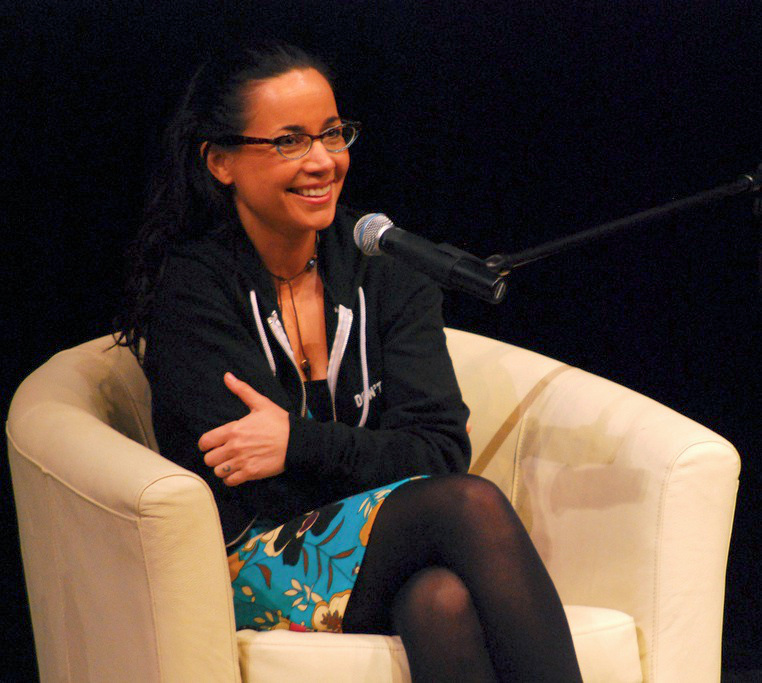
Garofalo at Bumbershoot 2008

Garofalo's big break came in 1990 after meeting Ben Stiller at Canter's Deli in Los Angeles, where they were hanging out with stand-up friends. They bonded over their "love of SCTV, early Saturday Night Live, and Albert Brooks."

Her first exposure on national television came soon thereafter by way of her appearance as a stand-up comic on MTV's Half Hour Comedy Hour. Subsequently, her first television series debut was on the short-lived Ben Stiller Show on Fox in 1992, on which she was a cast member alongside longtime friends Bob Odenkirk and Andy Dick.

A chance meeting on the set of that show led her to being offered the role of Paula on The Larry Sanders Show on HBO, earning her two Primetime Emmy Award for Outstanding Supporting Actress in a Comedy Series nominations in 1996 and 1997. For a time, she was actually working on both series simultaneously. After The Ben Stiller Show was cancelled, Garofalo joined the cast of Saturday Night Live (SNL) for its 1994–95 season. She left SNL in March 1995 (mid-season) after only six months, saying that the experience left her "anxious and depressed", and that a sexist attitude pervaded the show. She said that many of the sketches were "juvenile and homophobic". According to New York Magazine, Garofalo was "largely stuck in dull, secondary wife and girlfriend roles", and quoted her friends as saying that she considered the stint "the most miserable experience of [her] life."

Following SNL, Garofalo appeared in a plethora of guest star roles: the grown-up daughter of the Buchmans on the final episode of Mad About You; Jerry Seinfeld's female counterpart (and, briefly, fiancée) Jeannie Steinman on Seinfeld; a recurring correspondent on Michael Moore's TV Nation, and a former girlfriend of Dave Foley's character on NewsRadio. She provided the voice for the weekly conversations between the series lead and an older friend (Garofalo) in Felicity. Two television pilots starring Garofalo, the 2003 ABC show Slice O'Life about a reporter consigned to sappy human interest stories appearing at the end of news broadcasts, and the 2005 NBC program All In, based on the life of poker star Annie Duke, were not picked up by their respective networks.

Throughout the 2005–06 television season, Garofalo appeared on The West Wing as Louise Thornton, a campaign adviser to the fictional Democratic presidential nominee.

In 2006, she provided the voice for the animated character "Bearded Clam" on Comedy Central's Freak Show. In 2007, she wrote a dedication for the mini-book included in the six-DVD box-set of the 1994 cult series My So-Called Life.

Garofalo had segments titled "the disquisition" in several episodes of the 2007 season of The Henry Rollins Show which took place in her apartment, much in the same way Rollins' segments take place at his house. In 2009, Garofalo joined the cast of 24, where she starred as Janis Gold. In 2010, Garofalo joined the cast of Ideal as Tilly. She was a cast member of the Criminal Minds short-lived spinoff TV series Criminal Minds: Suspect Behavior in 2011.

In 2014, she portrayed Lyla, an entertainment lawyer, in seven episodes of the TV series Girlfriends' Guide to Divorce. In 2015, she starred alongside most of the original cast in the Netflix eight-episode prequel to the 2001 comedy film Wet Hot American Summer. In 2017, Garofalo starred in E4's comedy-drama series Gap Year. She's also appeared in episodes of Younger, Billions, Awkwafina Is Nora from Queens, and Harley Quinn.

=== Writing ===
Garofalo co-wrote a comedic New York Times bestseller with Ben Stiller in 1999, titled Feel This Book: An Essential Guide to Self-Empowerment, Spiritual Supremacy, and Sexual Satisfaction, a spoof of the self-help books prevalent at the time. She wrote her HBO Comedy Half-Hour along with similar appearances and programs, co-wrote some sketches on The Ben Stiller Show and an episode of the television series Head Case, and wrote and directed a 2001 comedy short, Housekeeping.

== Political and religious views ==
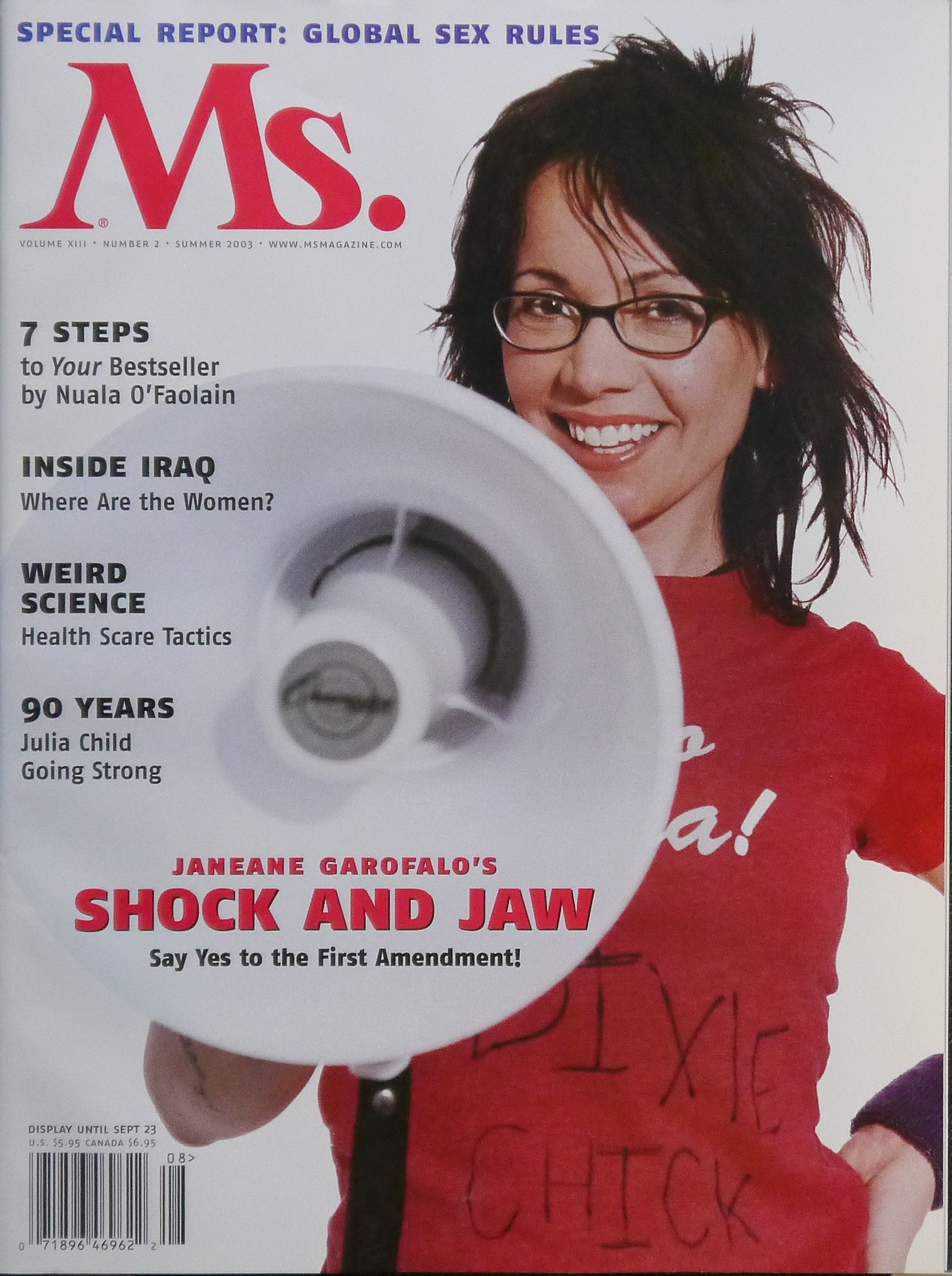
Garofalo on the cover of Ms. in 2003

Garofalo has been open about her liberal political views. She is a feminist. In an interview for Geek Monthly magazine, she stated that she was raised in a conservative family.

She has appeared with political figures such as Ralph Nader (whom she supported in the 2000 election, but opposed in 2004) and Jello Biafra at various events. In 2007, Garofalo described herself as an atheist, and participated in a radio interview by Freethought Radio, a show by the Freedom From Religion Foundation.

She became more prominent as a liberal when she voiced opposition to what became the 2003 Iraq War, appearing on CNN and Fox News to discuss it. She said that she was approached by groups such as MoveOn.org and Win Without War to go on TV, because these organizations say that the networks were not allowing antiwar voices to be heard. Garofalo and the other celebrities who appeared at the time said they thought their fame could lend attention to that side of the debate. Her appearances on cable news prior to the war garnered her praise from the left and spots on the cover of Ms. and Venus Zine. Garofalo has had frequent on-air political disputes with Bill O'Reilly, Brian Kilmeade, and Jonah Goldberg.

Prior to the 2003 Iraq War, she took a position on the alleged threat posed by Saddam Hussein. For example, in an interview with Tony Snow on a February 23, 2003, episode of Fox News Sunday, Garofalo said of the Iraqi leader:

Yes, I think lots of people are eager to obtain weapons of mass destruction. But there's no evidence that he (Hussein) has weapons of mass destruction. There's been no evidence of him testing nuclear weapons. We have people that are in our face with nuclear weapons. We've got Iran and North Korea. We've got a problem with Pakistan. You know, I don't know what to say about that. There's a whole lot of people that are going nuclear. And I think that Saddam Hussein is actually, with the evidence, the least able to use nuclear weapons and the least obvious offender in that area at this moment.

— Janeane Garofalo, Fox News interview

In March 2003, she took part in the Code Pink anti-war march in Washington, D.C. That autumn, she served as emcee at several stops on the Tell Us the Truth tour, a political-themed concert series featuring Steve Earle, Billy Bragg, Tom Morello, and others. Throughout the year, Garofalo also actively campaigned for Howard Dean. While on Fox News' program The Pulse, O'Reilly asked Garofalo what she would do if her predictions that the Iraq war would be a disaster were to turn out wrong. Garofalo stated:

I would be so willing to say, 'I'm sorry'. I hope to God that I can be made a buffoon of, that people will say, 'You were wrong. You were a fatalist.' And I will go to the White House on my knees on cut glass and say, 'Hey, you and Thomas Friedman were right ... I shouldn't have doubted you ...'

— Janeane Garofalo, Fox News interview

Garofalo said she had misgivings in 2007 about the depiction of torture in the television series 24 but joined the cast because "being unemployed and being flattered that someone wanted to work with me outweighed my stance".

In February 2009, Garofalo said on Countdown with Keith Olbermann on MSNBC that then-current Republican National Committee chairman Michael Steele suffered from Stockholm Syndrome and that "any female or person of color in the Republican party is struggling with Stockholm Syndrome".

In April 2009, Garofalo drew criticism from The Washington Times when she denounced Tea Party protests, which she referred to as racist. She continued to criticize Tea Party protesters.

In 2009, conservative website and magazine Townhall reported that Garofalo once said "Our country is founded on a sham. Our forefathers were slave-owning rich white guys who wanted it their way. So when I see the American flag, I go, 'Oh, my god, you’re insulting me.' That you can have a gay pride parade on Christopher Street in New York, with naked men and women on a float, cheering, 'We’re here and we’re queer!' — that’s what makes my heart swell. Not the flag, but a gay naked man or woman burning the flag. I get choked up with pride."

She received attention and right-wing criticism again in August 2011 after saying on Current TV's former program Countdown with Keith Olbermann that she speculated that 2012 presidential candidate Herman Cain was possibly being paid to run for president to deflect from racism in the Republican Party, conservative movement, and Tea Party. She was criticized by Cain, who denied her criticisms and called them "pathetic and hilarious".

=== Air America Radio ===
In late March 2004, Garofalo became a co-host for Air America Radio's new show The Majority Report, alongside Sam Seder. The early days of Air America Radio are chronicled in the documentary Left of the Dial, which includes a debate between Garofalo and her conservative father Carmine, who was initially a regular guest on The Majority Report.

Garofalo commented on her show of April 28, 2006, supporting the Scientology-linked New York Rescue Workers Detoxification Project, a controversial treatment for workers suffering ailments from 9/11 clean-up efforts in New York City. Garofalo dedicated a number of episodes of "Majority Report" to the program and brought conflict between her and her co-host Sam Seder. The show's producer and Seder finally walked off the program when Garofalo said Seder would not have opposed it if it had been "linked to Jews instead of Scientologists."

== Personal life ==
Garofalo struggled with alcoholism, giving up drinking in 2001.

Garofalo married Robert Cohen, then a writer for The Ben Stiller Show, in Las Vegas in 1991. She later explained it was intended as a joke, the pair thinking that the marriage was not binding unless it was filed at a local courthouse. Cohen later became engaged to Jill Leiderman, a producer of Jimmy Kimmel Live!; it was discovered later, when Cohen tried to marry, the marriage was indeed legal. The union with Cohen was dissolved in 2012.

In 2019, Garofalo publicly came out as asexual.

== Filmography ==
=== Film ===
Film work by Janeane Garofalo
Year	Title	Role	Notes
1991	Late for Dinner	Cashier	
1992	That's What Women Want	Jennifer	Short film
1994	Reality Bites	Vickie Miner	
1994	Suspicious	Woman	Short film
1995	Bye Bye Love	Lucille	
1995	I Shot a Man in Vegas	Gale	
1995	Coldblooded	Honey	
1995	Now and Then	Wiladene	
1996	The Truth About Cats & Dogs	Abby Barnes	
1996	The Cable Guy	Melinda	
1996	Larger than Life	Mo	
1997	Sweethearts	Jasmine	
1997	Touch	Kathy Worthington	
1997	Romy and Michele's High School Reunion	Heather Mooney	
1997	The Matchmaker	Marcy Tizard	
1997	Cop Land	Deputy Sheriff Cindy Betts	
1998	Clay Pigeons	Agent Dale Shelby	
1998	Kiki's Delivery Service	Ursula	Voice – Disney English dub
1998	Thick as Thieves	Anne	
1998	Permanent Midnight	Jana Farmer	
1998	Half Baked	"I'm Only Creative When I Smoke" Smoker	
1998	The Thin Pink Line	Joyce Wintergarden-Dingle	
1999	The Bumblebee Flies Anyway	Dr. Harriman/Handyman	
1999	Torrance Rises	Herself	Short film
1999	Can't Stop Dancing	Belinda Peck	
1999	Mystery Men	The Bowler/Carol	
1999	Dogma	Liz	
1999	The Independent	Paloma Fineman	
1999	200 Cigarettes	Ellie	
1999	The Minus Man	Ferrin	
2000	Dog Park	Jeri	
2000	Steal This Movie!	Anita Hoffman	
2000	Titan A.E.	Stith	Voice
2000	The Adventures of Rocky and Bullwinkle	Minnie Mogul	
2000	The Cherry Picker		Short film
2000	What Planet Are You From?	Nervous Woman	
2001	Wet Hot American Summer	Beth	
2002	Martin & Orloff	Hairdresser	
2002	Big Trouble	Officer Monica Romero	
2003	Manhood	Jill	
2003	The Laramie Project	Catherine Connolly	
2003	The Search for John Gissing	Linda Barnes	
2003	Housekeeping	Hotel Employee	Short film; voice role
2003	Wonderland	Joy Miller	
2003	Ash Tuesday	Liz	
2003	Nobody Knows Anything!	Patty	
2004	Jiminy Glick in Lalawood	Dee Dee	
2005	Duane Hopwood	Linda	
2005	The Peace Patriots	Narrator	Documentary film
2005	Stay	Beth Levy	
2006	The Wild	Bridget the Giraffe	Voice role
2007	Ratatouille	Colette Tatou	Voice role
2007	Southland Tales	General Teena MacArthur	
2007	The Ten	Beth Soden	
2007	Then She Found Me	Herself	
2008	The Guitar	Dr. Murray	
2009	Labor Pains	Claire	
2009	Love Hurts	Hannah Rosenbloom	
2012	General Education	Gale Collins	
2012	Bad Parents	Kathy	
2012	Mighty Fine	Older Natalie	Voice role
2013	Satan, Hold My Hand	Sheryl	Short film
2014	A Little Game	Sarah Kuftinec	
2014	Free the Nipple	Anouk	
2015	3rd Street Blackout	June Sherman	
2016	Little Boxes	Helena	
2016	The American Side	Agent Barry	
2016	The Happys	Luann	
2017	Sandy Wexler	Herself	
2017	Speech & Debate	Marie	
2017	Submission	Magda Moynahan	
2018	A Bread Factory	Jordan	
2018	Hurricane Bianca: From Russia with Hate	Magda	
2019	Come as You Are	Liz	
2019	Mercy Black	Dr. Ward	
2020	Asking For It	Cheryl	
2021	The God Committee	Valerie Gilroy	
2021	Flora & Ulysses	Marissa	
2022	The Apology	Gretchen Sullivan	
2024	Boys Go to Jupiter	Dr. Dolphin	Voice role
2026	Roommates	Professor Ziemann	
2027	Romy and Michele 2	Heather Mooney	Filming
TBA	Grind	TBA	In production
TBA	Dedicated to Morris Burke	TBA	In production

=== Television ===
Television work by Janeane Garofalo
Year	Title	Role	Notes
1992–1993	The Ben Stiller Show	Various characters	13 episodes
1992–1998	The Larry Sanders Show	Paula	47 episodes
1993	Tales of the City	Coppola Woman	Miniseries
1994	The Adventures of Pete & Pete	Ms. Brackett	Episode: "X=WHY?"
1994–1995	Saturday Night Live	Various characters	14 episodes
1995	Duckman	Moonbeam (voice)	Episode: "The Germ Turns"
1995	NewsRadio	Nancy	Episode: "Sweeps Week"
1995	Mr. Show with Bob and David	Wife	Episode: "What to Think"
1995	The State	Herself	Halloween Special
1995	TV Nation	Correspondent	2 episodes
1995	HBO Comedy Half-Hour	Herself	Stand-up special
1996	Dr. Katz, Professional Therapist	Janeane (voice)	Episode: "Drinky the Drunk Guy"
1996	Ellen	Chloe Korban	Episode: "Two Mammograms and a Wedding"
1996	Space Ghost Coast to Coast	Herself	Episode: "Late Show"
1996	Seinfeld	Jeannie Steinman	2 episodes: "The Invitations", "The Foundation"
1996	1996 MTV Movie Awards	Co-host	With Ben Stiller
1997	Home Improvement	Tina	Episode: "A Funny Valentine"
1997	HBO Comedy Hour	Herself	Stand-up special
1997	Law & Order	Greta Heiss	2 episodes
1997	The Chris Rock Show	Girlfriend (voice)	Episode: "#2.12"
1998	Felicity	Sally Reardon (voice)	14 episodes
1998, 2011	The Simpsons	Herself (voice)	2 episodes: "The Last Temptation of Krust", "The Ten-Per-Cent Solution"
1999	Mad About You	Mabel Buchman	Episode: "The Final Frontier"
1999	The Tom Green Show	Herself	
2000	The Sopranos	Herself	Episode: "D-Girl"
2000	Strangers with Candy	Cassie Pines	2 episodes
2000	Ed	Liz Stevens	Episode: "Pilot"
2003	King of the Hill	Sheila (voice)	Episode: "Night and Deity"
2004	The King of Queens	Trish	Episode: "Cheap Saks"
2004	Aqua Teen Hunger Force	Donna (voice)	Episode: "Hypno-Germ"
2004	Tanner on Tanner	Herself	2 episodes
2005	Nadine in Date Land	Nadine Barnes	TV film
2005	Stella	Jane Burroughs	Episode: "Novel"
2005–2006	The West Wing	Louise Thornton	15 episodes
2006	Freak Show	The Bearded Clam (voice)	7 episodes
2006	Tom Goes to the Mayor	Herself (voice)	Episode: "Couple's Therapy"
2007	Two and a Half Men	Sharon	Episode: "Media Room Slash Dungeon"
2008	Girl's Best Friend	Mary	Television film
2008	Wainy Days	David's Mom	Episode: "Angel"
2009	Greek	Professor Freeman	Episode: "Endangered Species"
2009	24	Janis Gold	21 episodes
2009	Head Case	Herself	Episode: "The Wedding Ringer"
2010	The Increasingly Poor Decisions of Todd Margaret	Brent's Boss	Episode: "Where Todd and Brent Misjudge the Mood of a Solemn Day"
2010–2011	Ideal	Tilly	13 episodes
2011	Criminal Minds: Suspect Behavior	Beth Griffith	13 episodes
2012	Metalocalypse	Abigail Remeltindrinc (voice)	5 episodes
2012	Ugly Americans	(voice)	Episode: "The Dork Knight"
2012–2013	Delocated	Susan Shapiro	9 episodes
2014	Inside Amy Schumer	Sharon Overwood	Episode: "Slow Your Roll"
2014–2015	Girlfriends' Guide to Divorce	Lyla	7 episodes
2014–2019	Broad City	Monica	3 episodes
2015	Wet Hot American Summer: First Day of Camp	Beth	7 episodes
2015	The Jim Gaffigan Show	Eve	3 episodes
2016	Nightcap	Janeane Garofalo	Episode: "The Horny Host"
2016	Jon Glaser Loves Gear	Herself	Episode: "Cycling"
2017	Michael Bolton's Big, Sexy Valentine's Day Special	Herself	Variety special
2017	Gap Year	Sam	2 episodes
2017	Wet Hot American Summer: Ten Years Later	Beth	7 episodes
2018	Baroness von Sketch Show	Herself / Pay Equity Meeting Attendee / Lawyer	Episode: "Sex and Things and Whispers"
2018	The Shivering Truth	(voice)	Main role
2019	At Home with Amy Sedaris	Herself	Episode: "Anniversary"
2019	BoJack Horseman	Isabel / Every Animal Girl Giraffe (voice)	Episode: "Feel-Good Story"
2019	Stumptown	Janet Withers	Episode: "Bad Alibis"
2020	Joe Pera Talks with You	Herself	Episode: "Joe Pera Watches Internet Videos With You"
2020	Helpsters	Subway Sandra	Episode: "Billy Bug/Cody Rides a Bike"
2021	Younger	Cass DeKennessy	6 episodes
2021	Billions	Dawn Winslow	2 episodes
2021	Fairfax	Denise (voice)	Episode: "Chernobylfest"
2022–present	We Baby Bears	Madame Malin / Old Lady Rootmouth (voice)	Main role
2023	Awkwafina Is Nora from Queens	Carol	Episode: "Car Fished"
2023	Harley Quinn	Signora / Mama (voice)	Episode: "II Buffone"
2026	Stranger Things: Tales from '85	Anna Baxter (voice)	
2026	Rick and Morty	Big Margo, Lintana (voice)	Episode: "Salute Your Mortys"
2026	President Curtis	Chief Usher Cherri (voice)	Episode: "David"

=== Music videos ===
- "Angel Mine" (Cowboy Junkies) (1996)

=== Documentaries ===
- New York: A Documentary Film (1999)
- Outlaw Comic: The Censoring of Bill Hicks (2003)
- Dangerous Living: Coming Out In The Developing World (2003)
- Gigantic (A Tale of Two Johns) (2003)
- Left of the Dial (2005), HBO
- I Am Comic (2010)
- Misery Loves Comedy (2015)
- Sticky: A (Self) Love Story (2016)
- Too Soon: Comedy After 9/11 (2021)

== Awards and nominations ==
Year	Award	Category	Nominated work	Result
1995	CableACE Awards	Actress in a Comedy Series	The Larry Sanders Show	Nominated
1996	American Comedy Awards	Funniest Supporting Actress in a Motion Picture	Bye Bye Love	Nominated
1996	American Comedy Awards	Funniest Supporting Female Performer in a TV Series	The Larry Sanders Show	Nominated
1996	CableACE Awards	Actress in a Comedy Series	The Larry Sanders Show	Nominated
1996	Primetime Emmy Awards	Outstanding Supporting Actress in a Comedy Series	The Larry Sanders Show	Nominated
1997	American Comedy Awards	Funniest Lead Actress in a Motion Picture	The Truth About Cats & Dogs	Nominated
1997	CableACE Awards	Actress in a Comedy Series	The Larry Sanders Show	Nominated
1997	Primetime Emmy Awards	Outstanding Supporting Actress in a Comedy Series	The Larry Sanders Show	Nominated
1997	MTV Movie & TV Awards	Best Comedic Performance	The Truth About Cats & Dogs	Nominated
1998	Chlotrudis Awards	Best Supporting Actress	Romy and Michele's High School Reunion	Nominated
1999	American Comedy Awards	Funniest Female Performer in a TV Special	The Ms. Foundation's Women of Comedy	Nominated
2000	American Comedy Awards	Funniest Lead Actress in a Motion Picture	Mystery Men	Nominated
2006	Screen Actors Guild Awards	Outstanding Performance by an Ensemble in a Drama Series	The West Wing	Nominated
2008	Annie Awards	Outstanding Achievement for Voice Acting in a Feature Production	Ratatouille	Nominated
2008	Visual Effects Society Awards	Outstanding Performance by an Animated Character in an Animated Motion Picture	Ratatouille	Won

== Books ==
- Feel This Book: An Essential Guide to Self-Empowerment, Spiritual Supremacy, and Sexual Satisfaction ISBN 0-694-52146-9 (with Ben Stiller)

== See also ==
- Saturday Night Live parodies of Hillary Clinton

Preceded by Courteney Cox and Jon Lovitz	MTV Movie Awards host 1996 (with Ben Stiller)	Succeeded by Mike Myers
