= New England Film & Video Festival =

American regional independent and student film festival

The New England Film & Video Festival, founded in 1976, was a leading regional independent and student film festival, and was the longest running regional film festival in the United States until it ceased to be held following the 2007 festival.

The Online New England Film Festival, founded in 2009, has partially filled the void left by its predecessor.
