= Frances Crowe =

American peace activist and pacifist (1919–2019)

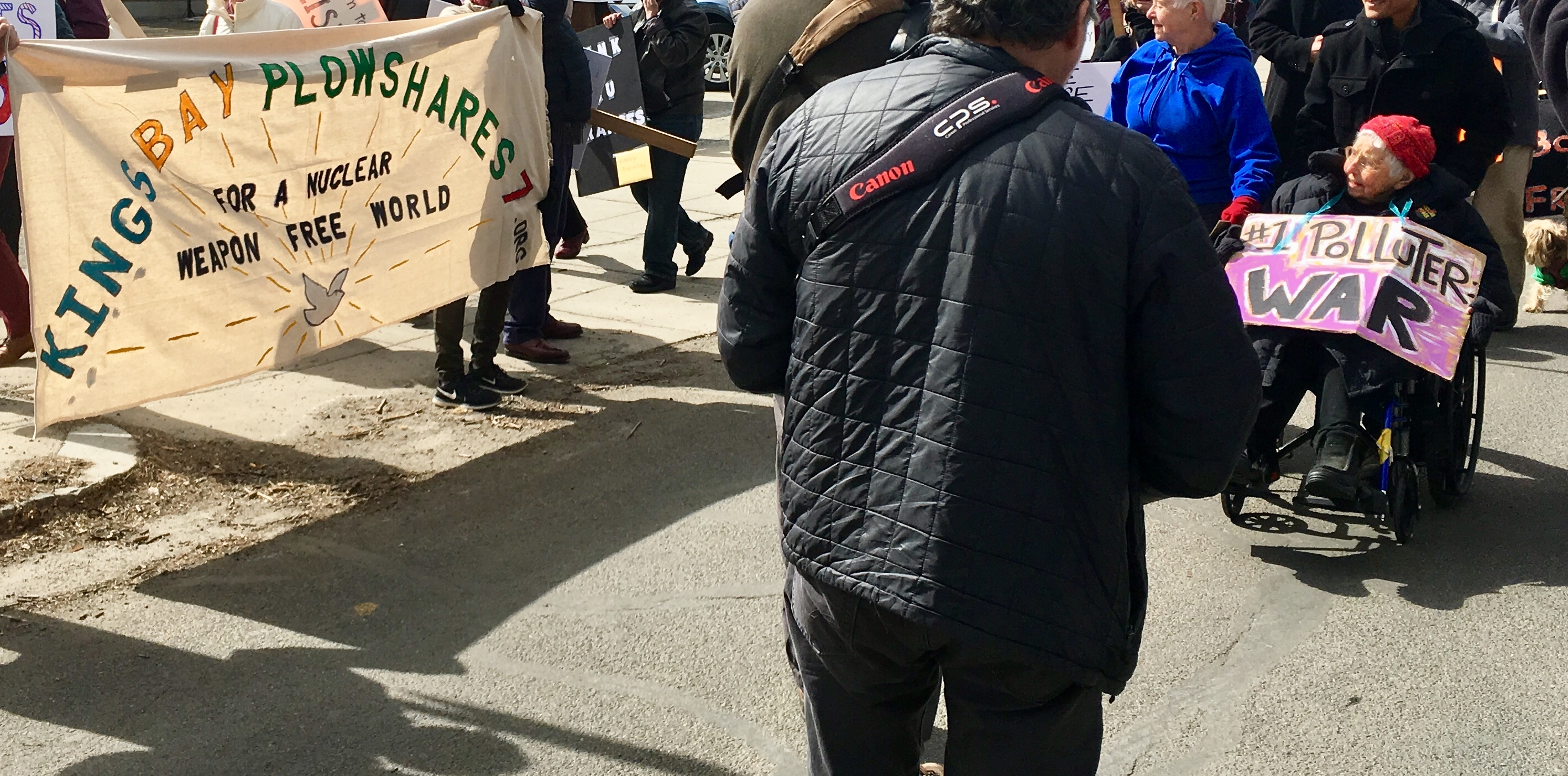
- Born: Frances Hyde; March 15, 1919; Carthage, Missouri, U.S.
- Died: August 27, 2019 (aged 100); Northampton, Massachusetts, U.S.
- Education: Stephens College; Syracuse University
- Occupations: Pacifist, peace activist
- Spouse: Thomas J. Crowe (m. 1945; died 1997)
- Children: three

Frances Crowe (née Hyde; March 15, 1919 – August 27, 2019) was an American peace activist and pacifist from the Pioneer Valley of Western Massachusetts.

== Early life ==
Frances Hyde was born in Carthage, Missouri on March 15, 1919. Growing up, she witnessed a public hanging held outside on the courthouse lawn; hawkers sold tickets to the best views. This grounded a lifetime resistance to capital punishment. She held degrees from Stephens College in Columbia, Missouri (1939) and Syracuse University (1941), and conducted graduate work at Columbia University and The New School for Social Research. She married Thomas Crowe, a physician, in 1945 and had three children.

== Career and activism ==
Crowe worked for Bell Labs during World War II. In 1945, following the bombing of civilian populations in Dresden, Hiroshima, and Nagasaki, she became a peace activist. Her participation in numerous protests led to arrests, trials, and imprisonment. She was active in the Society of Friends, American Friends Service Committee (running the local office from the basement of her Northampton, Massachusetts home for several decades), and War Resisters League, and co-founded the Traprock Peace Center (based in Deerfield, Massachusetts) and the Committee to End Apartheid (based in Springfield, Massachusetts). In the 1960s, she founded the Northampton, Massachusetts chapter of Women's International League for Peace and Freedom, the Sane Nuclear Policy Committee (now Peace Action), and the Valley Peace Center (based in Amherst, Massachusetts), and also participated in the activities of Women Against the War and Amnesty International.

In 1967, during the Vietnam War, she worked as a draft counselor, providing counseling to over 2,000 people about applying for conscientious objector status by the war's end. She continued to be an advocate for conscientious objectors. Stating that she could not pay for killing, she became a war tax refuser since the beginning of the Iraq War. She was also one of the core members of the Northampton Committee to Stop the War in Iraq and the Alliance for Peace and Justice, which is a Western Massachusetts coalition consisting of individuals and organizations. The Alliance was formed in December 2009 in response to President Obama's call to increase the troops in Afghanistan and she was explicit in helping the Alliance pass the "Bring Our War $$ Home" resolution in Northampton, Massachusetts and Amherst, Massachusetts.

Crowe was active in the movement against nuclear power and for safe energy in New England since the 1970s and was one of 1414 people arrested at the occupation of the Seabrook nuclear power plant construction site in April, 1977. She was arrested numerous times. Three arrests: In September 2009, Crowe and three other women were arrested for non-violent civil disobedience at the Vermont Yankee Nuclear Power Plant. She was also arrested in Washington DC at the Veterans for Peace demonstration on December 16, 2010 (at 91 yrs of age) along with 6 other women from Western MA. She was arrested on January 15, 2014 (94 years old) again at the Vermont Yankee Nuclear Power Plant Her latest arrest occurred on June 24, 2017 at the age of 98. She was protesting the building of the Kinder Morgan pipeline through a Massachusetts forest.

== Personal life ==
Crowe became a vegetarian in 1971 after reading Frances Moore Lappé's Diet for a Small Planet. She was a Quaker.

== Awards ==
For her lifelong commitment to the Peace Movement and her unrelenting opposition to war through war tax resistance and eco-pacifist lifestyle, she was awarded the Courage of Conscience award May 4, 2007, by the Peace Abbey in Sherborn, Massachusetts.

Crowe was a recipient of the Joe A. Callaway award in December 2009. In her acceptance speech, Crowe said that "core awareness lies at the bottom not the top."

== See also ==
- Anti-nuclear protests in the United States
- Harvey Wasserman
- List of peace activists
