= WTTW =

Television station in Chicago

- Chicago, Illinois; United States
- Channels: Digital: 25 (UHF); Virtual: 11
- Branding: WTTW

Programming
- Affiliations: 11.1: PBS; for others, see § Subchannels

Ownership
- Owner: Window to the World Communications, Inc.
- Sister stations: WFMT

History
- First air date: September 6, 1955
- Former channel numbers: Analog: 11 (VHF, 1955–2009); Digital: 47 (UHF, 2002–2019)
- Former affiliations: NET (1955–1970)
- Call sign meaning: "Window to the World"

Technical information
- Licensing authority: FCC
- Facility ID: 10802
- ERP: 250 kW
- HAAT: 496 m (1,627 ft)
- Transmitter coordinates: 41°52′44.1″N 87°38′10.2″W

Links
- Public license information: Public file; LMS
- Website: www.wttw.com

WTTW (channel 11) is a PBS member television station in Chicago, Illinois, United States. Owned by not-for-profit broadcaster Window to the World Communications, Inc., it is sister to commercial classical music radio station WFMT (98.7 FM). The two stations share studios in the Renée Crown Public Media Center, located at 5400 North Saint Louis Avenue (adjacent to the main campus of Northeastern Illinois University) in the city's North Park neighborhood; its transmitter facility is atop the Willis Tower on South Wacker Drive in the Chicago Loop. WTTW also owns and operates The Chicago Production Center, a video production and editing facility that is operated alongside the two stations.

WTTW is one of two PBS member stations serving the Chicago market, alongside Gary, Indiana–licensed WYIN (channel 56). WTTW, along with PBS Wisconsin flagship station WHA-TV in Madison, Wisconsin, serve as default PBS member stations for Rockford as that market does not have a PBS station of its own; both stations are available in that market on local cable and satellite providers.

== History ==
WTTW first signed on the air on September 6, 1955, as a member station of National Educational Television (NET). The station was founded by a group of civic-minded Chicagoans, led by Inland Steel executive Edward R. Ryerson. Channel 11 came to life during the first year of the inaugural term of Mayor Richard J. Daley; Daley, Ryerson and businessman Irving B. Harris were responsible for creating WTTW, which began its life with studios and offices in Chicago's Banker's Building. It also had a 'working exhibit' facility at the Museum of Science and Industry in Chicago's Jackson Park. The call letters WTTW were chosen as the founders wanted the station to be Chicago's "Window To The World". The station's transmitter was given to WTTW by the staff and management of the defunct KS2XBS, a pay television station operated by Zenith Radio Corporation on VHF channel 2 that was forced to shut down as a result of CBS owned-and-operated station WBBM-TV's relocation to that channel in July 1953.

Ryerson recruited a young communications lawyer, Newton N. Minow, to join the station's board; Minow would serve as both chairman of the WTTW board and as Commissioner of the Federal Communications Commission (FCC) under the administration of President John F. Kennedy. Irving B. Harris, Henry W. "Brick" Meers, John W. McCarter Jr., Martin J. "Mike" Koldyke and Sandra P. Guthman have served as chairman of the board for the public broadcaster in subsequent decades. Guthman, a member of the Polk Brothers family of Chicago, is the current chairman of the board, having served in that post since October 2003.

Minow stated that the only really important decision that he made during his tenure as chair of WTTW was the recruitment of William J. McCarter Jr. as president and chief executive officer, a post which he held for 27 years. Having run public station WETA-TV in Washington, D.C., McCarter—a decorated Korean War hero and a veteran television pioneer—got his start in the broadcasting industry as a cameraman for American Bandstand and then as a part of the Army-McCarthy hearings on Capitol Hill. McCarter developed the concept of the political roundtable that is now a staple of television news. In non-commercial television circles, McCarter is referred to as the "architect" of public television (his friends know him as the man who kicked Bob Dylan—who was set to tape an episode of SoundStage and was found by McCarter asleep on the couch in the room—out of his office, waking the bearded Dylan up and ushering him out of the office after McCarter returned from a meeting).

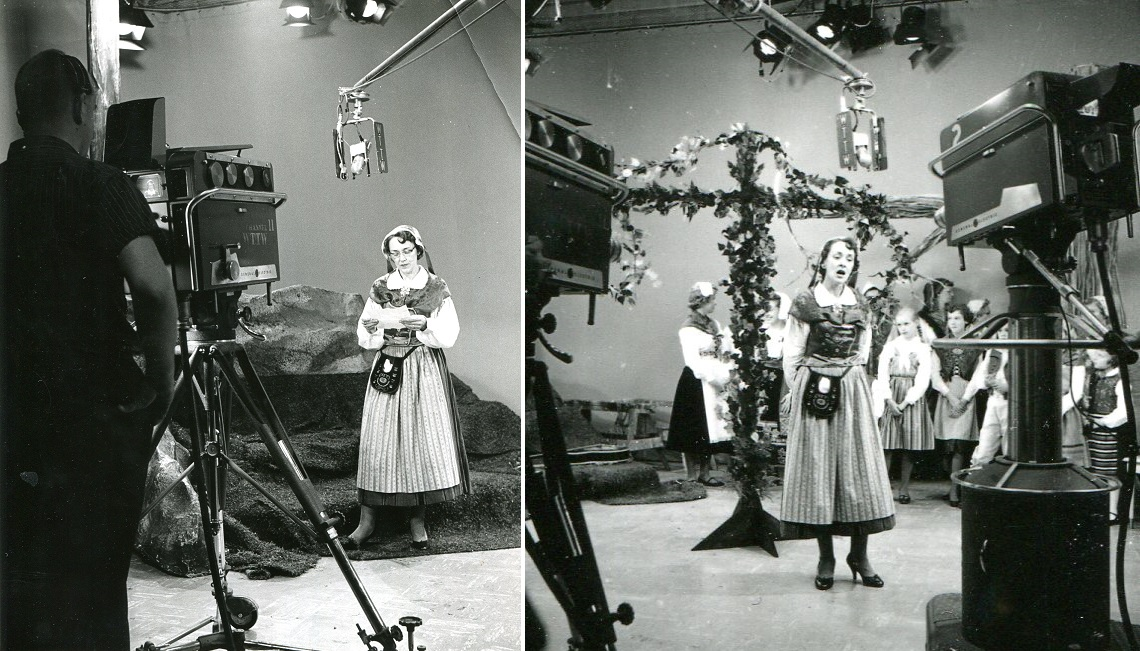
Birgit Ridderstedt rehearsing and performing on WTTW's Totem Club in 1959

During the 1960s, WTTW aired educational programming during the daytime hours, showing programs produced under the auspices of Chicago Area Schools Television (CAST). Programs from "TV College", covering college subjects, were also shown on weekdays. Other afternoon shows included a locally produced series titled The Storyteller, which featured a children's story presented weekdays at 5:30 p.m., and was sponsored by the locally based Marshall Field & Company department store chain.

In 1962, WTTW's owner, then known as the Chicago Educational Television Association (CETA) began efforts for a second educational station. to air additional classroom instructional courses, especially those displaced as more and more of its own broadcast day was filled first with programming from National Educational Television (NET). On September 20, 1965, sister station WXXW signed on as Chicago's second UHF television station on channel 20.

On October 5, 1970, WTTW became a charter member station of the Public Broadcasting Service (PBS).

WTTW did not air shows on Saturdays until the summer of 1972. At first, it only had a limited schedule until 2 p.m. Then, in 1974, it expanded to a full day. In the late 1970s and early 1980s, WTTW was used to test stereo sound for TV broadcasts overnight.

WTTW's sister station WXXW quietly went dark in 1974 when the transmitter broke down. It had been one of the last in Chicago to transmit in black-and-white and by then its schedule was filled with what former WTTW station manager Edward Morris called "talking heads and a blackboard". In 1977, WTTW sold the long-dark WXXW license to a consortium led by City Colleges of Chicago; the station ultimately became WYCC.

In 1981, the Chicago Educational Television Association created Chicago magazine as WTTW and WFMT's program guide. It was sold for $17 million in 1986 to a joint venture between Metropolitan Detroit Magazine and Adams Communications.

On August 7, 1984, WTTW became the first U.S. TV station to broadcast its entire schedule in stereo.

On November 22, 1987, WTTW's signal was hijacked by an unknown person wearing a Max Headroom mask—the second such signal interruption incident to occur in the Chicago area that night, with the first taking place during the 9 p.m. newscast on independent station WGN-TV (channel 9) two hours prior to the hacker's intrusion of the WTTW signal. While WGN-TV's analog transmitter was located atop the John Hancock Center at the time, allowing for engineers to almost immediately thwart the video hacker by changing the studio-to-transmitter frequency, WTTW's transmitter was located atop the Sears Tower (now the Willis Tower), which made it harder to stop the hacker before the interruption voluntarily concluded after almost two minutes.

On June 4, 2010, Window to the World Communications announced that it would lay off around 12% of WTTW and WFMT's employee base and extend a salary freeze instituted in 2009 for one additional year, in an effort to cut $3 million in operating costs due to declining revenue, effects from the economic downturn and the loss of $1.25 million in grant money from the Illinois General Assembly. Among the employees exiting WTTW in that layoff were Randy Chandler, Amy Christenson, Andy Fontana, Marc Glick, Susan Godfrey, Andrea Guthmann, Kari Hurley, Andre Jones, Shaunese Teamer, Sarah Warner and Tom Wuellner.

In 2012, WTTW eliminated the position of 16-year company veteran Joanie Bayhack, who had been senior vice president of communications and corporate partnerships. In 2014, WTTW eliminated the position of Holly Gilson, a 13-year veteran of the company who most recently had been director of strategic partnerships and special projects.

On April 15, 2014, Window to the World Communications renamed the broadcasting facilities for WTTW and WFMT-FM as the Renée Crown Public Media Center, following a monetary gift of an undisclosed amount by the family of Renée Crown (wife of Lester, who has served as a trustee for Window to the World since 1981).

In September 2017, WTTW offered former fellow PBS member station WYCC (the descendant of former sister station WXXW) with a channel-sharing agreement to stay on the air after an announcement that WYCC would shut down October 25, 2017. (WYCC had sold its spectrum in the April 2017 FCC auction.)

On December 7, 2017, Window to the World Communications announced its intent to purchase the WYCC license outright, reuniting the stations under one organization. An application to the FCC in January 2018 disclosed that WTTW would acquire the WYCC license from the City Colleges of Chicago for $100,000, with the two stations sharing WTTW's frequency allocation. The sale was approved by the FCC on March 13, 2018, and was completed on April 20.

Window to the World Communications relinquished the WYCC license, effective June 1, 2022, advising viewers the same shows were available on its multiplexed channels and the PBS app.

== Technical achievements ==
WTTW has been recognized as a pioneer in technical aspects of television broadcasting, particularly in broadcast audio transmission. The station, in particular, participated in the trend of pop music-focused programs on television during the early 1970s (a few of which were also simulcast on local FM radio stations). When WTTW began production on Made in Chicago, the station made the decision to transition from monaural audio to stereo for the FM broadcasts. However, stereo recording equipment for television production did not exist at that time. Because of this, WTTW engineers chose to modify existing Ampex quadruplex recorders to provide a stereo medium in sync with the video portion of the program. This innovation earned the station's staff a local Technical Emmy Award in 1973.

Further refinements to this system resulted in improvements to both frequency response and noise reduction, and eventually led to the ability to edit stereo audio as the video was being edited electronically. Dolby Laboratories noise reduction technology (Type C, and then Type A) was introduced as the staff was driven to make improvements in the audio specifications. WTTW began syndicating Made in Chicago to other public television stations under the new title Soundstage, with the first official taping of that program in June 1974 featuring previously filmed concert footage of folk singer Jim Croce prior to his death in a plane crash in September 1973. The station was broadcast in simulcast FM stereo—with WXRT (93.1 FM) and WBBM-FM (96.3) as participating stations—in the manner of its predecessor.

In 1975, WTTW management was approached by a startup company called Telesonics with an idea to develop an audio system for television broadcasts that used a mono-compatible, stereo audio channel. Around this time, the Sears Tower had been completed and WTTW became one of the first broadcasters to move its transmitter facilities atop the new building; WTTW had broadcast from a temporary antenna as the now familiar twin towers that adorn the top of the building had not yet been completed.

== Programming ==
WTTW carries programs distributed by PBS, American Public Television and other sources, along with airing several locally produced programs. WTTW also distributes several programs to public television stations independently of PBS, such as via American Public Television. In addition, WTTW is one of the few public television stations that regularly produce or present national public television programming. Its most prominent productions include political discussion program The McLaughlin Group and the music program Soundstage. WTTW has produced over 110 SoundStage episodes from its Chicago studios, the first of which featured Chicago blues legend Muddy Waters surrounded by his young proteges: Dr. John, Junior Wells, Michael Bloomfield, Koko Taylor, Rollo Radford, Buddy Guy, Nick Gravenites, Buddy Miles and his long-time collaborator, pianist Otis Spann among others.

WTTW also produced the popular cooking series The Frugal Gourmet during the 1980s. Other popular programs produced by WTTW for public television syndication have included the early art-video show Image Union; CEO Exchange; locally produced restaurant review show Check, Please! cooking show Mexico: One Plate at a Time; travel show The Travel Detective; children's programs Lamb Chop's Play-Along, Kidsongs, WordWorld and Nature Cat; and the irreverent magazine series Wild Chicago.

The most well-known program ever to have been originated by WTTW was Sneak Previews, the first movie review show to air on television. It began in 1975 with film critics Roger Ebert (then a critic for the Chicago Sun-Times) and Gene Siskel (then with the Chicago Tribune) as its hosts and was later hosted by Michael Medved, Neal Gabler, and Jeffrey Lyons when Siskel and Ebert moved into syndication (starting the show At the Movies with Gene Siskel and Roger Ebert and later Siskel & Ebert & the Movies); Sneak Previews was canceled in 1996. In January 2011, WTTW produced a new movie review program created by Ebert, Ebert Presents: At the Movies, which was hosted by Christy Lemire and Ignatiy Vishnevetsky, with Ebert himself hosting a segment called "Roger's Office"; the program lasted one season, before being canceled due to funding constraints and the subsequent death of Ebert.

Among its local programs, WTTW also produces the newsmagazine and analysis program Chicago Tonight, hosted by Paris Schutz and Brandis Friedman. The program began in 1984 as a half-hour panel interview program with local broadcast journalist John Callaway, but was later expanded to an hour-long show with the addition of various feature segments including arts and restaurant reviews. The show is accompanied by two pre-recorded programs highlighting issues affecting Black and Latino communities, Chicago Tonight: Black Voices and Chicago Tonight: Latino Voices.

The station has produced hundreds of significant arts programs, highlighting the Chicago Symphony Orchestra, the Lyric Opera of Chicago and the Ravinia Festival. In addition, WTTW features documentaries hosted by Geoffrey Baer, spotlighting the history and culture of various parts of the Chicago area. These programs' popularity has often resulted in a high volume of monetary pledges to the station. It also produces The Artsiders, an arts-focused program produced by Kai Harding, Inc. and created by former Big Idea director Chris Olsen.

== Technical information ==
=== Subchannels ===
The station's signal is multiplexed:

Subchannels of WTTW
Subchannel	Res.	Short name	Programming
11.1	720p	WTTW HD	PBS
11.2	720p	Prime	WTTW Prime
11.3	480i	Create	Create
11.4	480i	Kids	PBS Kids

In May 2015, WTTW downgraded the resolution of its main channel from 1080i to 720p, which the station had previously transmitted its high definition content in prior to September 2009, during which time it downconverted HD content provided by PBS from their native 1080i format.

==== WTTW-DT2 ====
From the sign-on of its digital signal in 2002 until 2008, WTTW branded its main digital channel on 11.1 as "WTTW-Digital", featuring a full schedule of programs available in high definition, while digital subchannel 11.2 rebroadcast the main programming schedule of analog channel 11. In September 2008, digital channel 11.1 was converted into a simulcast of the analog signal's programming, resulting in it carrying the same programming schedule as 11.2. On March 30, 2009, 11.2 was relaunched with a separate schedule as "WTTW Prime", which features a mix of PBS prime time programs and WTTW's locally produced programming—particularly during the period from 6 a.m. to 6 p.m., when children's programming airs on the main channel. WTTW Prime carries some PBS programs in their traditional timeslots (most notably, a block of the service's public affairs programs that run on Friday evenings and a daily airing of the Nightly Business Report at 5:30 p.m.).

=== Analog-to-digital conversion ===
WTTW shut down its analog signal, over VHF channel 11, on June 12, 2009, the official date on which full-power television stations in the United States transitioned from analog to digital broadcasts under federal mandate. The station's digital signal continued to broadcast on its pre-transition UHF channel 47, using virtual channel 11.
