= List of Strangers with Candy characters =

This is a list of characters from the Comedy Central original program Strangers with Candy.

== The Blanks ==
=== Jerri Blank ===
Geraldine Antonia "Jerri" Blank (Amy Sedaris) was born in 1953 to a drunken Aramapu woman, who traded her for a pitcher of beer. She was adopted by Guy Blank and his wife, whom she believes to be her real mother. In 1967, Jerri dropped out of high school and ran away from home. During her absence, her adoptive mother died and her father married a second wife, Sara, who is around Jerri's own age. Around 1984, Jerri was living in Florida, where she was beaten by a border guard and lost a tooth. That same year, she became pregnant by either an obese, harelipped bail bondsman or a Cuban. She gave birth to a child, Ricky (Fred Koehler), whom she traded for a guitar. She claims to have had several other pregnancies, all of which were aborted, or possibly miscarried, considering her drug addiction. She served several prison sentences, most recently because she, as worded in the introduction, “stoled [sic] the TV”. In 1999, Jerri returned to Flatpoint and re-enrolled in high school at the age of 46.

She is openly racist, though she appears to be completely oblivious to this fact. For example, she denied any racism to her friend Paul Cotton immediately before showing him her heavily stereotyped drawing of a "Chinaman". She often compares her Filipino friend Orlando to a monkey, although her remarks aren’t meant to cause offense (she thinks monkeys are adorable). She also makes randomly antisemitic remarks, which is curious because she doesn't know any Jewish people. At one point, she feels compelled to apologize to her diary for being antisemitic to it. Jerri's bigotry is always presented as an example of her stupidity and ignorance, and she has never been violent towards any of the minority groups she insults; however, in the twisted, valueless world of the show, her views are never really contradicted or punished, and she is inevitably allowed to carry on with her behavior. The show's storylines also provide her with many opportunities to be insensitive to other groups, such as the blind and the disabled.

Jerri is not very intelligent, but she is a shrewd thief and resourceful drug user (e.g., finding a vein, creating drugs from household cleaners, etc.). She was illiterate until the episode "The Blank Page", where she tried out for cheerleading and was shunned because she guessed that "V-I-C-T-O-R-Y" spelled "Win!" (or possibly "fandango" or "hobocamp"), but Mr. Noblet helped her learn to read. She is a violin prodigy, as seen in the episode "To Be Young, Gifted, and Blank". In that episode, she was also the timpanist for the school's orchestra. At the end of "Yes, You Can't", she is seen playing the drums for "Carry On Wayward Son", perhaps leading the viewer to believe that she is a talented drummer as well. In "Trail of Tears", Jerri proves herself to be an excellent "Indian": she's a great archer, scalper, and torch-thrower. She also does not seem to be above any form of inappropriate intercourse, once saying that she and a boy she had just discovered was her son could still make out, or continuing to have sex after being diagnosed with syphilis, gonorrhea, and crabs.

Jerri seems to have quite a collection of wigs (her hairstyle changes constantly, growing longer or shorter within a single episode) and wears an inordinate amount of makeup. Sedaris intended her to look "like somebody who owns snakes" (which she does in an early episode). She has a very large genital piercing (which she calls "The Liberty Bell") and sports tattoos across her knuckles (Hard on one hand, Luck on the other, a parody of Robert Mitchum’s tattoos in Night of the Hunter [though in some episodes, according to Amy Sedaris, the Luck sometimes becomes Fuck]). Despite all the effort she puts into her appearance and her own belief that she is quite sexy, over the course of the series she is frequently mistaken for an old man. She is desperate to be liked and accepted, even going so far as to join a cult with this purpose in mind.

In the series finale, "The Last Temptation of Blank", Jerri's big heart caused the most popular girl (Winona Ryder) in school to run off to become a junkie whore like her, and later she, Principal Blackman, Mr. Jellineck, and Mr. Noblet decide to become whores after they burn down the school, as they feel this life direction "beats teaching".

=== Guy Blank ===
Guy Blank (Roberto Gari, Dan Hedaya in the film) is Jerri’s adoptive father, shown only in a voiceless, frozen state during mid-action (for example, carving a turkey, driving a car, or participating in a father–daughter sack race practice). Guy appeared in the pilot and in the episodes “Old Habits, New Beginnings”, “A Burden’s Burden”, “Who Wants Cake?”, “Bogie Nights”, “Feather in the Storm”, “Jerri is Only Skin Deep”, and finally “The Goodbye Guy”. In this episode, he is mauled to death by dogs, traumatizing Jerri but allowing her to learn the lesson that "you can never really lose your parents, unless of course they die, and then they're gone forever." Guy played the violin until the death of Jerri’s mother, after which he developed a seeming hatred for the instrument. Evidence points to Guy Blank as being a racist; he evidently calls Principal Blackman by “an ugly word,” requested that “no darkies” attend his funeral, and owned some Klan robes (Jerri discovered them in his closet after his death, although she was distracted and didn’t seem to notice them, or else didn't care) - this may also have contributed to Jerri's racism. Based on one picture Jerri finds after Guy’s death, it appears that in the continuity of the show, it was Guy and not Steve McMichael who joined the Four Horsemen professional wrestling stable in 1996.

Removed from the regular cast list after the first season, he is credited as guest star in later appearances.

=== Sara Blank ===
Sara Blank (Deborah Rush) is Jerri’s alcoholic stepmother who favors her son over her stepdaughter and has an ongoing affair with Stew, the meat man. While she is generally quite prim, she is also openly racist. She was in every episode except “Yes, You Can’t” and “The Blank Page”. She is quite disdainful of Jerri (in the Strangers film, she told Stew, “I wouldn’t want you to think that that slithered out of my womb.”), but she delivers most of her lines with a sugary sweetness that hides much of her true venom. She makes no secret of wanting Jerri out of the house, but for some reason she goes along with the idea of Jerri as a high-school girl and treats Jerri more like an unwanted teenage daughter than a 40-something-year-old woman. Sara was an actress when she was young and played Peter Pan in a stage production; when Jerri got a role in A Raisin in the Sun, Sara became very bitter, drunkenly sobbing, “Peter Pan has gotten old!” On one occasion, though, Sara seemed almost caring toward Jerri, taking an interest in whom she was inviting to a dance and offering to reinforce the “trouble spots” on her dress if it turned out Jerri took one of the violent students (she was very worried that Jerri would take the “new kid”).

While Sara and Derrick seem to despise Jerri, when Jerri briefly vanished from their lives, they made a big show of being worried and consoling each other; of course, every time the phone rang (it was Jerri), they picked it up only to immediately hang it up again. Eventually, they cut the phone cord with a butcher knife and took no further action to find Jerri.

Removed from the regular cast list after the first season, in later appearances she is credited as guest star.

=== Derrick Blank ===
Derrick Blank (Larc Spies, Joseph Cross in the film) is Jerri’s junior varsity jock half-brother who is suspected of being a closeted homosexual. In “Is My Daddy Crazy?”, when Jerri was hosting a sleepover, his mother urged him to hide in the closet and masturbate to the scene of high-school girls having a pillow fight, but he declined in favor of reading his “gladiator magazines.” He was, however, entranced by guest-star Winona Ryder in the series finale “The Last Temptation of Blank”. Another clue to his alleged homosexuality comes in “Is Freedom Free?” when Mr. Jellineck, sporting only a Speedo (because it’s “Freedom Week”), declares that he’s “going to see Derrick”. Jellineck, a closeted homosexual, would have little other reason to visit Derrick, especially in a Speedo.

Derrick typically refers to Jerri as “Plug” or “Troll”, and in several episodes he appears close to striking her, but something - a doorknob, his father's hand - always holds him back (in "The Trip Back", he perhaps came closest to the truth when he sneered, “You’re just lucky I’m a coward!”). Jerri's usual retort to his bullying is calling him a "faggot" (or getting creative about it, such as "Sir Fags-a-Lot"). He has a crew of jock friends, and they enjoy bullying blind kids and other unfortunates. They also have a garage band, from which one member (Mark Ibold) is ejected for being too talented and making the others look bad ("Behind Blank Eyes"). On one occasion, after one of their targets verbally shot them down, Derrick suggested to his friends that they “go watch some gay porn and get our hate back!” He was in every episode except “Yes, You Can't”, “The Blank Page”, “To Love, Honor, and Pretend”, and “Bully”.

Removed from the regular cast list after the first season, he is credited in later appearances as guest star.

=== Stew ===
Stew (David Pasquesi) is the lover that Sara Blank took after Guy Blank’s death. He is married and has two children, Chuck and Patty. He is a “meat man,” a butcher and meat delivery man, which is used as a basis for puns and other running gags throughout the series. In “Is My Daddy Crazy?”, he went temporarily insane and coated the house with cheese before his reflection fired him, and he was cured by Jerri drilling a hole through his skull.

He appeared in many episodes of the first and second seasons before Guy’s death, in close relationship with Sara, leading many to strongly suspect they were having an affair. Even before Guy's death, he filled the role of father to Jerri, first by being unthoughtful and emotionally abusive like Sara, and then by being loving and attentive when he became completely insane.

Stew’s name is intentionally spelled like the food, as is confirmed by his work shirt which has S-T-E-W on the name tag (seen in the film and in episodes such as “Feather in the Storm”).

== Flatpoint faculty ==
Character	Position	Actor/Actress
Onyx Blackman	Principal	Greg Hollimon
Iris Puffybush	Secretary	Dolores Duffy
Cassie Pines	Student counselor	Janeane Garofalo
Chuck Noblet	History / science	Stephen Colbert
Geoffrey Jellineck	Art	Paul Dinello
Cherri Wolf	Health / physical education	Sarah Thyre
Jazzy	Music	Larry Marshall
Joe Liss	Football coach	Joe Liss

=== Chuck Noblet ===
Charles "Chuck" Noblet (Stephen Colbert) is a bitter history (usually) teacher at Flatpoint High School. He seems to make up almost everything he teaches, stating that in light of the Japanese American internment, "it's important that we never forget the atrocities that the Japanese committed against our boys", that "following his violent revolution, Gandhi was devoured by his followers", that "the tragedy" of Martin Luther King Jr.'s life "is that all this footage is in black and white; imagine how powerful it would have been in color" (and adding that he is "not sure" what happened to King), that "the tragic irony of the Trojan War" is that "though it was fought over Helen, who was young and beautiful, by the time they rescued her ten years later, she was old and ugly" (moral: "an ugly woman is never a reward"), and that "the Opium War was fought in 1840 to 1842 between the Chinese and the Mexicans".

The subject Noblet teaches changes often over the course of the series, and in the film he teaches science. Noblet frequently wears cowboy boots (and at one point, only cowboy boots—when he posed nude for a sketch by Jellineck). He secretly desires to be a rock star and appears to idolize the band Kansas in particular. He is also in a secret love affair with Jellineck and frequently refers to his wife, Clair, to maintain his appearance of heterosexuality. He has a son, Seamus, who is mentioned but never seen in the series. Noblet seems to harbor more guilt and shame over his sexuality than Jellineck and will instantly abandon him in order to keep his own homosexuality a secret, but the two appear to have genuine feelings for each other; whenever their relationship is in trouble, Noblet will weep wretchedly. The two sometimes consummate their affair through roleplaying: pretending to "bump into each other" for the first time, introducing themselves (with much discussion of their wives and children), and ultimately sneaking off somewhere to have sex.

Noblet appeared in all episodes except “The Virgin Jerri”. In the final episode of the series, Noblet openly tells his class about the “hot, ass-thumping sex” that he and Jellineck enjoy; however, the class was not paying attention since it was the final week of school. In an interview with Terry Gross, Colbert addressed the question of why Noblet is always so cruel to Jerri, saying that Noblet is miserably repressed and has built his entire life on lies, which has placed him in constant fear of exposure, and he is thus deeply threatened and resentful of Jerri for always asking questions and trying to figure her life out.

=== Geoffrey Jellineck ===
Geoffrey Jellineck (Paul Dinello) (pronounced JOFF-ree, as opposed to the more common JEFF-ree) is Jerri’s flamboyant, insecure, narcissistic art teacher. He appeared in all episodes except “Blank Stare: Part 1”. Jellineck has repeatedly stated he is a “confirmed bachelor”, though he refers to imaginary children and a dead wife as part of his odd fantasy life, most notably in “A Burden’s Burden”. He revealed that he became wealthy after allegedly participating in his rich aunt’s death in “A Price Too High for Riches”, the Season 2 finale, which must have taken place chronologically after Season 2, Episode 3, “Yes, You Can’t”, where Jellineck briefly becomes homeless after quitting his job. He and Chuck Noblet share a homosexual relationship, which is allegedly secret, although everyone but Blackman seems to know about it. Jellineck is superficially a very kind and sunny person (in the film he tells Jerri, “You can talk to me: I’m an authority figure, but I have the mind of a child."), and he is generally very encouraging to Jerri, albeit without having much actually valuable guidance to offer. Paul Dinello has said that this aspect of the character was based on the personalities of teachers and professors who try to be "one of the kids" and think they're succeeding, but in reality are regarded as slightly creepy. Beneath the surface, Jellineck has plenty of rage and despair, and these dark emotions surface with very little provocation. He has been bullied by his students and even by one of the school's teachers, although he is a pacifist (and a coward) and refuses to fight back. On one memorable occasion, Jellineck lost his face in a car accident caused by Jerri, although it was eventually found and restored. After it was first reattached, it nearly blew away in the wind, but otherwise he seems to have made a full recovery.

=== Onyx Blackman ===
Onyx Blackman (Greg Hollimon) is the overly stern principal of Flatpoint High who appeared in all thirty episodes. He rules Flatpoint High with an iron fist, insisting that his likeness be placed in as many prominent positions throughout the school as possible, including, but not limited to, the school letterman jackets, the buses, silk robes, every classroom, air fresheners, art projects, restrooms, paper towels, and even behind shelves. He also seems to take great pleasure in making announcements over the loudspeaker which include phrases such as "Hearken to my voice!" and are accompanied on at least one occasion by his secretary, Iris Puffybush, dramatically playing the bongos.

Various episodes establish that Blackman has a gambling problem, is divorced, still lives with his parents, and has a fetish for middle-aged white women. Blackman apparently enjoys a very active sex life (he is seen romancing several ladies during the course of the series, once even enjoying a romantic, candlelit dinner in his office in the middle of a school day). For some reason, he is absolutely clueless about Noblet and Jellineck's ongoing affair, even when confronted with fairly obvious evidence. He is concerned about the reputation of the school insofar as his lifestyle and livelihood depend on it, but he displays very little interest in his students themselves or in education in general. As a black man, he is frequently the object of other characters' racism, but, perhaps due to his naturally callous approach to sensitive matters, seems to accept it without objection.

=== Cherri Wolf ===
Coach Cherri Wolf (Sarah Thyre) is the Flatpoint gym coach and a suspected lesbian/bisexual. While she is depicted as a stereotypical “dyke” coach for most of the show’s run, she apparently fell in love with Geoffrey Jellineck while they were pretending to be married during “To Love, Honor, and Pretend”, but he broke her heart when he left their fake marriage to go back to his secret relationship with Chuck Noblet. She claimed to be a virgin well into adulthood and preached abstinence to her students, but then she slept with a fiery Latino pizza chef in “The Virgin Jerri”. Coach Wolf also worked at the pizza parlor to make ends meet. Her class was rebuilt into a Sticky Bunnery in the last episode, and she got a job there, citing better pay and child care.

=== Iris Puffybush ===
Iris Puffybush (Dolores Duffy) is the school secretary in such episodes as “To Love, Honor, and Pretend” and “Bully”. Duffy also pops up in other places throughout the show, such as a secretary in the doctor's office in "Jerri’s Burning Issue” and a nurse in “Hit and Run”.

=== Cassie Pines ===
Cassie Pines (Janeane Garofalo) is the student counselor at Flatpoint High, and, as such, her first responsibility is, of course, to the teachers. She openly despises the students and clearly hates her job, giving horrible advice to Jerri after her father died. At the end of the series, she got a job in the Sticky Bunnery alongside Coach Wolfe. According to the audio commentary, Cassie Pines' name is a reference to coffins as caskets made of pinewood.

=== One-time faculty ===
- Coach Joe Liss (Joe Liss, "Behind Blank Eyes"), the school's football coach
- Glenn (Ken Hudson Campbell, "The Blank Page"), the school's bus driver who doesn't know how to drive
- Señora Maria de los Angeles Pons Montez Garcia y Perez (Rose Abdoo, "The Blank Page"), the Spanish/Drivers Ed teacher, as both classes were combined due to budget cuts
- Miss Plog (Jackie Hoffman, "A Price Too High for Riches"), the school's job counselor
- Mr. Gwinette (Brian Keeler, "Invisible Love"), the school's science teacher, who is in a relationship with Tammi
- The Librarians (Steve and Mark O'Donnell, "Is My Daddy Crazy?"), eerie, otherworldly twins who assist Jerri in the school's library
- Jazzy (Larry Marshall, "There Once Was a Blank From Nantucket"), the music teacher at Flatpoint High with an affection for the female students that he must find clever ways to curb. He misses his days as a heroin addict.
- Mr. Tidbits (Ross Bickell, "Bully"), substitute teacher who is homophobic and bullies Jellineck
- School Nurse (Callie Thorne, "Bully"), who is unsympathetic to Jerri's plight
- Hillary and Lee (Cheri Oteri and Mark McKinney, "The Last Temptation of Blank"), members of the school board who are secretly shutting the school down to build a strip mall

== Flatpoint students ==
=== Orlando Pinatubo ===
Orlando Pinatubo (Orlando Abdo Pabotoy) is Jerri’s best friend, a Filipino whom she constantly mocks because of his race. In the first season especially, he had a huge crush on Jerri and was not above spreading rumors about her love interests to stop her from seeing them (as in “Bogie Nights” and “Let Freedom Ring”). Jerri does not reciprocate his romantic feelings. Like Tammi Littlenut, he is very innocent, always expects the best of Jerri, and is crestfallen when she inevitably disappoints him. He is close to his family, and they hold “parties” where they dance and tell stories with their hands. In the final episode, Orlando and Tammi have both become obsessed with a Dungeons & Dragons–like role-playing game.

The character Megawatti Sukarnoputri is used in the film version.

=== Tammi Littlenut ===
Tammi Littlenut (Maria Thayer) is Jerri’s best girlfriend and frequent object of her lust. In most cases, she is grounded and sane, providing a voice of reason and normalcy in the odd social structure of Flatpoint High and tries to give Jerri good advice, though she never takes it. Like Orlando, she is a very sweet and innocent person who never seems to grasp how sleazy Jerri truly is. However, in very rare instances, Tammi can be seen joining in with other Flatpointers in acts of bullying and paranoia (she joins in laughing at Glen the Bus Driver in "The Blank Page", for instance). Additionally, in “Invisible Love”, she had a close romantic relationship with the school’s science teacher. Frequently referred to as "Tammela", “Coppertop”, and “Nuttage” or as a “redheaded spitfire” by Jerri, Tammi occasionally brings out a more masculine side in Jerri: Jerri has become quite aggressive when defending Tammi from bullies ("Bully"), and when Tammi and Jerri were charged with taking care of a baby, Jerri quickly fell into the role of an emotionally abusive, deadbeat dad to Tammi's intimidated housewife ("A Burden's Burden").

=== Chip Beavers ===
Chip Beavers (Patrick Blindauer) appears in the episodes "Who Wants Cake?", "The Blank Page", "Hit and Run", "Trail of Tears", "Invisible Love" and "Is My Daddy Crazy?". Chip's main characterization is usually to raise his hand and attempt to answer a question usually supplied by Noblet, only to get yelled at.

=== Jimmy Tickles ===
Jimmy Tickles (Jack Ferver) appears in the episodes "The Virgin Jerri", "To Love, Honour and Pretend" and "Jerri's Burning Issue". He is Tammi and Jerri’s diminutive and presumably gay friend. Often he is spontaneously beaten up by jocks for no definite reason, though his beatings often follow particularly flamboyant dialog or actions of Jimmy’s (his repeated phrase I'm so jazzed! often directly led to his being beaten up). Jerri forced him to have sex with her in the girls’ bathroom at the end of "The Virgin Jerri". Early appearances, also before the beatings, showed him as being a relatively heterosexual, strait-laced student.

=== Trudy ===
Trudy (Virginia Williams) is a blonde, popular cheerleader who Jerri tries to impress in "The Virgin Jerri". Williams returns in three more episodes as Susie in "The Blank Page", Wilma in "Blank Relay" and Ginger in "The Last Temptation of Blank".

=== Sylvia ===
Sylvia (Kelly Hutchinson) is a goth girl and Jerri's friend, who appears in the episodes "Ask Jerri", "There Once Was a Blank from Nantucket" and "The Last Temptation of Blank".

=== Recurring school bullies ===
- P-John (Matt Blumm, "Let Freedom Ring", "Jerri is Only Skin Deep", "Behind Blank Eyes", "Is My Daddy Crazy?")
- Trake (Chuck Caruso, "Let Freedom Ring", "Jerri is Only Skin Deep", "Behind Blank Eyes", "The Blank Page")
- Troy (Troy Metcalf, "Behind Blank Eyes", "Hit and Run", "Blank Stare", "Is My Daddy Crazy?", "Bully", "The Last Temptation of Blank")

=== One-time students ===
- Poppy Downes (Jenna Lamia, "Old Habits, New Beginnings") is a popular girl who Jerri tries to impress, later she overdoses on the drug "glint"
- Brittany (Sarah Thompson, "Old Habits, New Beginnings"), Poppy's friend
- Craig Snow (Jacob Pitts, "Dreams on the Rocks"), Jerri's love interest and co-star in the school play, who helps her realise her stepmother is an alcoholic
- Kimberly Timbers (Tamera Gindlesperger, "Who Wants Cake?") is Jerri's friend who is suspected by Principal Blackman of being "retarded"
- Ricky (Fred Koehler, "Bogie Nights") is a new student and Jerri's love interest who turns out to be her long-lost son (who she traded for a guitar)
- Spike Jabber (Rob Renz, "Bogie Nights") is one of the school's "violent students", who Jerri is encouraged by everyone to date
- Paul Cotton (Jared Ryan, "Let Freedom Ring") is a student accused of spray painting the "N" word on a Flatpoint wall. Jerri befriends him and when it is revealed that Jerri is the culprit behind the crime, Paul reveals that his parents are black, but due to a recessive gene, he comes off as white.
- Lizzy Abrams (Ellen Pompeo, "Feather in the Storm") is a popular girl who bullies Jerri about her weight
- Toby (Deven Palmer, "Feather in the Storm") is an overweight black student and Jerri's eating buddy
- Yasmine Sarong (Sabine Singh, "Jerri is Only Skin Deep") is a popular cheerleader who bullies Jerri about her looks
- Becky Ann Bedecker (Rebecca Rich, "Jerri is Only Skin Deep") is a wholesome but unattractive student who is Jerri's competition for the Homecoming Queen
- Trish (Stephanie Sanditz, "The Trip Back") is a stoner girl whom Jerri befriends after not studying for her finals; turning back to drugs leads Jerri back to jail.
- Drake Rogers (Jeremy Davidson, "The Virgin Jerri"), popular jock who tempts Jerri after she has "reclaimed" her virginity
- Tina (Tessa Ghylin, "The Virgin Jerri"), Trudy's friend who Jerri is also trying to impress
- Audrey Stapina (Sue Gisser, "The Virgin Jerri"), a virgin student, Gisser also plays Stravulla in "There Once Was a Blank from Nantucket", an overweight student who Jellineck forces to be a nude model in his class
- Alan Tiresias (Matt Newton, "Behind Blank Eyes") is a blind new student at Flatpoint High who wants to try out for the football team, but no one will let him. Jerri befriends him and learns how difficult it is to be blind after trying a bandanna around her eyes to experience blindness.
- Daniel (Jeremy Nagel, "The Blank Page"), Jerri's love interest who later makes fun of her for not being able to read
- Ronnie , Jerri's partner in her "marriage" assignment, which ruins his relationship with his actual girlfriend Nancy (Lindsey Gates)
- Melissa (Jessica Boevers, "A Price Too High For Riches") is popular girl who makes fun of Jerri for being poor and not having Flair shoes, she is later implied to be murdered by Dick Sheridan (Gerry Vichi), Jerri's boss at the shoe store
- Jared Westerly (Derek Richardson, "Jerri's Burning Issue") is Jerri's one-episode boyfriend whom she has unprotected sex with, he later goes braindead from the syphilis she gives him.
- Arnie Arsenew (Ryan Patrick Bachand, "Is Freedom Free?") is the son of Minister Arsenew (Dylan Baker) who is paired with Jerri on her freedom-themed art assignment (where she takes nude photos of herself)
- Renee and Trudy (Heather Matarazzo and Valentine Bureau, "Is My Daddy Crazy?"), Jerri's friends at her sleepover who witness Stew's mental breakdown
- Laird (Chris Carmack, "Invisible Love") is a jock who dabbles in a secret relationship with Jerri. She is usually hiding in random places (i.e. garbage can, air duct) as he is ashamed of being seen with her.
- Jake (Jake Patellis), Laird's jock friend who bullies Jerri
- Sydney (Sophina Brown, "Ask Jerri") is Jerri's love interest, a black girl who works at the school paper
- Miles (Judson Morgan, "There Once Was a Blank from Nantucket") is a member of the school jazz orchestra who asks Jerri out, but Jerri, already dealing with sexual harassment from the jocks, has a "good-and-bad" outburst around him before telling him the truth.
- Skeet (Jamie Bennett, "There Once Was a Blank from Nantucket") is a jock who, with his friends, sexually harasses Jerri by openly mocking her sexual escapades and writing horrible things about her in the boys' bathroom. He and his friends planned to torment Jerri with a sign reading "Jerri Blank is a stupid whore" at the jazz recital, but Jerri beat them to it and revealed a relatively larger banner.
- Edie Harley (Natalie Blalock, "Bully") is a new student at Flatpoint who begins to bully Tammi, only for Jerri to step in and stand up for Tammi. Edie challenges Jerri to fight her after school, and because of her "street code", Jerri accepts. At the fight, Jerri tells Edie that she loves her, sparking Edie to hug Jerri; Jerri takes this chance to beat Edie down with the peace necklace Jellineck gave her.
- Fran (Winona Ryder, "The Last Temptation of Blank") is the most popular girl in school. When a classmate challenges her to turn Jerri cool enough for popular guy Brent Brooks to ask her out, Fran takes on the challenge. She is sarcastic and obnoxious, but by the end of the episode, she comes to admit that Jerri is cooler than her because of her big heart and runs off to "be a junkie whore for 32 years".
- Brent Brooks (Paul Rudd, "The Last Temptation of Blank") is presumably the most popular guy at Flatpoint. He stands in the background as the other popular kids pick on the unpopular; his dialogue is usually portrayed with boredom.

== Other characters ==
=== Random career guy ===
The random career guy (Andy Richter) is a heavyset possibly early-30-something guy who is seen in three episodes doing different jobs. In "Yes, You Can't", he is the Career Wizard, a recruitment coach for the local artificial flower company; in "Trail of Tears", he was an Indian operating the controls at the Tweetzie Railroad, when Jerri started throwing rocks at him; and in "Blank Relay", he was the NutriWhiz store clerk at a pharmacy, giving Jerri steroids.

=== Clair Noblet ===
Clair Noblet (Carolyn Popp, Evelyn McGee in the film) is Chuck Noblet’s wife, who is only seen three times in the series. It is believed that she and Chuck have a strained marriage, and she seems to exist only as his beard. In one scene, Chuck asks her "Will we be having sex tonight?" When she says no, he is relieved and can fall asleep.

=== One-time characters ===
- Sharpei (Kevyn Aucoin, "The Goodbye Guy") is Sara's gay friend who does Guy's makeup at his funeral
- Father (Alan Tudyk, "Blank Stare") is the leader of the cult that Jerri joined out of loneliness and depression in "Blank Stare" parts 1 and 2. By the end of "Blank Stare - Part 2", he is so sick of Jerri, he arranges to have her taken back by Blackman, Noblet, Jellineck, and the Flatpoint High staff.
