= Strangers with Candy (disambiguation) =

Strangers with Candy is a television series produced by Comedy Central.

Strangers with Candy may also refer to:

- Strangers with Candy, a five-piece nu metal music group
- Strangers with Candy (film), a 2005 American film
