= List of Strangers with Candy episodes =

The following is a list of episodes for the Comedy Central original series Strangers with Candy. The series started on April 7, 1999, and concluded its third and final season on October 2, 2000. A prequel film of the same name was released in 2005.

== Series overview ==
Season	Episodes	Originally aired		
Season	Episodes	First aired	Last aired	Time slot
Pilot episode		Unaired		
1	10	April 7, 1999	July 19, 1999	Wednesdays, 10:30 pm (April); Mondays, 10:00 pm (June)
2	10	January 17, 2000	July 3, 2000	Wednesdays, 10:30 pm (April); Mondays, 10:00 pm (June)
3	10	July 10, 2000	October 2, 2000	Wednesdays, 10:30 pm (April); Mondays, 10:00 pm (June)
Film		June 28, 2006		

== Episodes ==
=== Pilot episode ===
Title	Directed by	Written by	Original release date	Prod. code
"Retardation: A Celebration"	Adam Bernstein	Stephen Colbert, Paul Dinello, Mitch Rouse & Amy Sedaris	Unaired	100
Jerri is asked to spy on her lockermate, looking for signs of retardation. Later evolved into Episode 104, "Who Wants Cake?"

=== Season 1 (1999) ===
No.	Title	Directed by	Written by	Original release date	Prod. code
1	"Old Habits, New Beginnings"	Peter Lauer	Paul Dinello, Amy Sedaris & Mitch Rouse	April 7, 1999	101
Jerri tries to make friends by supplying a classmate with drugs.
2	"A Burden's Burden"	Peter Lauer	Paul Dinello & Amy Sedaris	April 14, 1999	102
Jerri is assigned to take care of a 10-pound baby in order to learn responsibility, reminiscent of the 1985 ABC Afterschool Special "First the Egg".
3	"Dreams on the Rocks"	Peter Lauer	Paul Dinello & Amy Sedaris	April 21, 1999	103
Jerri must deal with her stepmother's alcoholism, reminiscent of the ABC Afterschool Specials "Francesca, Baby" (1976) and "She Drinks a Little" (1981).
4	"Who Wants Cake?"	Peter Lauer	Paul Dinello, Amy Sedaris & Mitch Rouse	April 28, 1999	104
Jerri is asked to spy on her lockermate, looking for signs of retardation.
5	"Bogie Nights"	Peter Lauer	Paul Dinello, Amy Sedaris & Thomas Lennon	June 14, 1999	105
Jerri befriends the new student, Ricky (Fred Koehler) but discovers a secret that will keep them apart forever.
6	"Let Freedom Ring"	Peter Lauer	Paul Dinello, Amy Sedaris & Mitch Rouse	June 21, 1999	106
Flatpoint High is in the grip of a racist who spray-painted an ethnic slur on the wall, reminiscent of the 1989 ABC Afterschool Special "Taking a Stand".
7	"Feather in the Storm"	Danny Leiner	Paul Dinello & Amy Sedaris	June 28, 1999	107
Jerri must lose weight to be in physical shape for the debate team, which she thinks is her ticket to popularity, loosely inspired by the ABC television film The Best Little Girl in the World. Meat man "Stu" (David Pasquesi) moves in with the family.
8	"To Be Young, Gifted, and Blank"	Dan Dinello	Paul Dinello & Amy Sedaris	July 5, 1999	108
Mr. Noblet discovers that Jerri is a violin prodigy, and he strives to use her talents for his own purposes in competing against Mr. Jellineck's orchestra, reminiscent of the 1982 ABC Afterschool Special "Between Two Loves".
9	"Jerri Is Only Skin Deep"	Danny Leiner & Bob Balaban	Paul Dinello & Amy Sedaris	July 12, 1999	109
Homecoming-Queen hopeful Jerri struggles with the Inner Beauty category.
10	"The Trip Back"	Peter Lauer	Paul Dinello & Amy Sedaris	July 19, 1999	110
Jerri turns back to a life of drugs after being seduced by a beautiful female druggie, reminiscent of the 1980 ABC Afterschool Special "Stoned".

=== Season 2 (2000) ===
No.	Title	Directed by	Written by	Original release date	Prod. code
11	"The Virgin Jerri"	Juan J. Campanella	Paul Dinello & Amy Sedaris	January 17, 2000	203
Jerri becomes a virgin again, but struggles with keeping her funbox closed.
12	"Behind Blank Eyes"	Juan J. Campanella	Paul Dinello & Amy Sedaris	January 24, 2000	202
Jerri finds herself attracted to a blind classmate. While she tries to navigate the sightless world (reminiscent of the 1976 ABC Afterschool Special "Blind Sunday"), he fights for the right to play on the football team.
13	"Yes, You Can't"	Dan Dinello	Paul Dinello & Amy Sedaris	January 31, 2000	201
Jerri agonizes over what she wants to do with her life while Mr. Jellineck quits teaching to become a starving artist.
14	"The Goodbye Guy"	Peter Lauer	Paul Dinello & Amy Sedaris	February 7, 2000	204
Jerri’s daddy is eaten by high school mascots, leaving her out of the big Father–Student Sack Race.
15	"The Blank Page"	Juan J. Campanella	Paul Dinello, Amy Sedaris & David Wain	February 21, 2000	206
Flatpoint High discovers Jerri’s illiteracy, which she must overcome in order to make the cheerleading squad, reminiscent of the 1984 ABC Afterschool Special "The Hero Who Couldn't Read".
16	"Hit and Run"	Peter Lauer	Paul Dinello & Amy Sedaris	February 28, 2000	205
Jerri runs over Mr. Jellineck and has difficulty keeping the secret, reminiscent of the 1979 ABC Afterschool Special "The Terrible Secret". Mr. Noblet discovers that the revelation of another secret is the key to Jellineck’s recovery.
17	"To Love, Honor, and Pretend"	Peter Lauer	Paul Dinello & Amy Sedaris	March 7, 2000	207
Jerri is assigned a partner in class to learn what married life is really like, reminiscent of the 1979 ABC Afterschool Special "Make Believe Marriage". Mr. Noblet grows jealous of the special fake bond between Mr. Jellineck and Coach Wolf as Jerri’s control issues threaten her own fake union in a marriage experiment gone awry.
18	"Blank Stare: Part 1"	Peter Lauer	Paul Dinello & Amy Sedaris	June 19, 2000	208
Jerri is recruited by a cult of happy people who sing the same song (a lot), reminiscent of the films Ticket to Heaven (1981) and Split Image (1982). Flatpoint High begins a radical change in politics, becoming a totalitarian regime, keeping its students/citizens to a code of strict anonymity and perfect obedience.
19	"Blank Stare: Part 2"	Peter Lauer	Paul Dinello & Amy Sedaris	June 26, 2000	209
After Jerri becomes perfectly assimilated into the cult’s mindset, its leader finds that sometimes cults have to be selective with their recruits. Jerri is thrown out of the cult and has to be deprogrammed.
20	"A Price Too High for Riches"	Peter Lauer	Nicholas Stoller, Paul Dinello & Amy Sedaris	July 3, 2000	210
Flairs, a shoe with a ridiculously long lace, take the fashion world by storm and become the key to Jerri’s social success.

=== Season 3 (2000) ===
No.	Title	Directed by	Written by	Original release date	Prod. code
21	"Jerri’s Burning Issue"	Peter Lauer	Paul Dinello & Amy Sedaris	July 10, 2000	301
With the school "Purity Dance" days away, Jerri struggles with the decision to tell her popular new boyfriend that she has contracted an epic case of syphilis.
22	"Is Freedom Free?"	Juan J. Campanella	Paul Dinello & Amy Sedaris	July 17, 2000	302
Jerri’s "au naturel" self-portrait ignites a storm of censorship from the school.
23	"Trail of Tears"	Juan J. Campanella	Paul Dinello & Amy Sedaris	July 24, 2000	303
Jerri must again face her own racist views when she discovers that she is a full-blooded Native American Indian and is sent to a cultural-immersion camp for adopted redskins.
25	"Is My Daddy Crazy?"	Peter Lauer	Paul Dinello & Amy Sedaris	July 31, 2000	304
Jerri wonders if she can cure her stepmother's lover's insanity in time for him to speak at Flatpoint High's Occupation Week, reminiscent of the 1989 ABC Afterschool Special "My Dad Can't Be Crazy...Can He?".
26	"Blank Relay"	Juan J. Campanella	Paul Dinello & Amy Sedaris	August 14, 2000	305
Desperate to stay on the track team, Jerri abuses steroids and pushes them to her teammates.
24	"Invisible Love"	Peter Lauer	Paul Dinello & Amy Sedaris	August 21, 2000	306
Jerri's secret relationship with the school stud makes her question her own self-respect.
27	"Ask Jerri"	Juan J. Campanella	Paul Dinello & Amy Sedaris	September 11, 2000	307
Jerri takes over the school newspaper’s advice column from Jellineck, reminiscent of the 1976 ABC Afterschool Special "Dear Lovey Hart: I Am Desperate". Disaster follows, especially in the relationship between Jellineck and Noblet.
28	"There Once Was a Blank from Nantucket"	Peter Lauer	Paul Dinello & Amy Sedaris	September 18, 2000	308
Jerri must deal with sexual harassment and prevent her new jazz-orchestra beau from finding out, reminiscent of the 1994 ABC Afterschool Special "Boys Will Be Boys: The Ali Cooper Story".
29	"Bully"	Peter Lauer	Paul Dinello & Amy Sedaris	September 25, 2000	309
Bullies threaten both Jerri and Jellineck, reminiscent of the 1972 ABC Afterschool Special "Psst! Hammerman's After You!".
30	"The Last Temptation of Blank"	Juan J. Campanella	Paul Dinello & Amy Sedaris	October 2, 2000	310
As Flatpoint High is set to turn into a strip mall, Jerri becomes friends with a popular girl (guest star Winona Ryder) and must decide if she wants to leave her old friends behind forever to finally find lasting popularity.

=== Film ===
Title	Directed by	Written by	Release date (U.S.)
Strangers with Candy	Paul Dinello	Stephen Colbert, Paul Dinello, Amy Sedaris	June 28, 2006
The film takes place before the series. Jerri Blank discovers her mother has died, her father, Guy, has remarried to the hateful Sara Blank, and she has an arrogant half-brother Derrick. To make matters worse, her father is in a "stress-induced coma". Taking the suggestion of the family doctor literally, Jerri decides to pick her life back up where she left it, beginning her high school all over again as a freshman at Flatpoint High.
