= Wigfield =

Book by Amy Sedaris, Paul Dinello and Stephen Colbert

- Cover of 2004 paperback reprint edition
- Author: Amy Sedaris; Paul Dinello; Stephen Colbert
- Language: English
- Genre: Satire
- Publisher: Hyperion Books
- Publication date: May 7, 2003
- Publication place: United States
- Media type: Print (Hardcover and Paperback)
- Pages: 224
- ISBN: 0-7868-6812-0
- OCLC: 51041798
- Dewey Decimal: 813/.6 21
- LC Class: PS3619.E34 W5 2003

Wigfield: The Can Do Town That Just May Not is a satirical novel by comedians Amy Sedaris, Paul Dinello, and Stephen Colbert, three of the four creators of the Comedy Central show Strangers with Candy. It was first published on May 7, 2003, by Hyperion Books.

The story concerns journalist Russel Hokes, who is trying to complete his assignment, write 50,000 words about a dying small town in America. In his desperate search he stumbles upon Wigfield, a quarter-mile stretch of concrete and gravel, dotted with strip clubs and used auto parts shops. In there he finds a number of colorful characters, and a town in crisis, as mayor Bill Farber wants to tear down the Bulkwaller Dam, thereby flooding the town.

== Background ==
Sedaris and Dinello first pitched to Hyperion a children's book about a worm searching for his identity. The idea came after she and her brother David, found an orange ceramic worm, which they named Montgomery. They would make up stories about the worm, although it eventually broke, Sedaris kept the idea in her mind, and thought it would make "a great character for a kids’ book." She and Dinello didn't have a plot, but would often think of the adventures the worm would go through. Hyperion was not convinced, and asked for something else. On that same meeting Sedaris and Dinello improvised the pitch of what would become Wigfield, inspired on a fake town full of weird characters, created by Sedaris in her youth. "I used to change my wig for all these different characters, so I called it Wigfield," she recalled.

Although it was rather vague, Hyperion thought it sounded promising, and picked it up. After reading the contract, and realising they had to write 50,000 words, they contacted collaborator Stephen Colbert. He declined at first, but after they asked again, he was reminded of Jefferson, West Virginia a town he had visited for "The Daily Show", Colbert said that when he joined the project, "All they had was the name of this town, Wigfield, a certain amount of shaping was required, you could say." Jefferson was incorporated so its business owners could avoid paying county taxes. "There was this mayor who was running on the platform that, 'If you elect me, I'll dissolve the town.' So this candidate wins the election, and then all these people living there contest it and organize this fight to save the town." Colbert recalled. They did most of the writing in Colbert's New Jersey home. The idea of making the lead character a reporter, came from them trying to reach the word count more easily. Dinello said: "We created the Hokes character out of necessity, it gave us the freedom to write anything. If someone says, 'That's barely a sentence,' we could say, 'Well, clearly that cat doesn't know how to write.'" The character of Donny Larson, Wigfield's local strip club manager, was also inspired by people Colbert met while growing up in the South, "Every choice in life they make usually hurts them and others, but they have no sense of personal responsibility whatsoever."

=== Images ===
At first Sedaris had an idea about a wordless picture book. The book features images of Wigfield's citizens as portrayed by Sedaris, Colbert and Dinello. The photographs were taken by fashion designer Todd Oldham, at his studio, and locations around Port Jervis, and Milford, Pennsylvania. Of Oldham, Colbert said, “He has a great sensibility, he finds the same things funny." He also recalled portraying stripper Raven, "It was my first time in elaborate drag. Two guys pressed in on my ribs and then a third one put duct tape across my chest to give me a waist. Then they said, 'Stick your ass out as far as you can toward the camera. Let's get a booty.' When I was finally made up with the outfit and the high heels, I was disturbingly attracted to myself". The rabbits featured in some of the book pictures, came from a Petland. Sedaris said: "Paul went [...] and got them. I felt so bad for those rabbits. They looked drugged, and they were really skinny. It's like, "Four rabbits were injured during the making of this book." Yikes. But I did save the costumes."

== Publication and reception ==
=== Publication history ===
The book sold over 29,000 copies in hardcover and paperback in its first three years of publication. It has also been published by Highbridge Audio as an unabridged audiobook with voice performances by Sedaris, Dinello, and Colbert.

=== Critical reception ===
Esquire said "Wigfield's virtuoso improvisations make it the print equivalent of SCTV."

== Adaptations ==
Due to budget restraints, Hyperion could not send the authors on a book tour. Instead, Sedaris, Colbert and Dinello organized a theatrical adaptation of the book. The show consisting mainly of staged readings, featuring large photos of each character projected on a screen set up behind the trio, was produced by WestBeth Entertainment, and launched at the Chicago Center for the Performing Arts on May 2, 2003. The show ran Off-Broadway through May 9–17 at New York City's Jane Street Theatre, to a sold-out crowd. It had further dates at Atlanta’s Woodruff Arts Center, Washington, D.C.’s Marvin Center and Boston’s Somerville Theatre. Wigfield ended with a string of shows at New York City's Lucille Lortel Theatre in July 2003. On their show at the Jane, Russell Scott Smith of the New York Post, said: "This is less a play than an elaborate book reading. The comics don't change costumes, and they hold copies of their book throughout the evening. But these are talented performers, and they inject their kooky characters with a weird charm."
