= Florrie Fisher =

American motivational speaker

- Born: Florence Louise Fisher; September 18, 1918; Brooklyn, New York
- Died: May 26, 1972 (aged 53); Miami, Florida
- Other name: Florence Louise Fisher Bacolod
- Occupation: Motivational speaker
- Spouse(s): 1. Joe Rosinsky; 2. David Bohm; 3. Danny Orenstein; 4. Manuel Bacolod

Florence Louise Fisher Bacolod (September 18, 1918 – May 26, 1972) was an American motivational speaker in the 1960s and 1970s who traveled to high schools in the United States, telling stories about her past as a heroin addict and prostitute. Her eccentric mannerisms and often lurid stories – which included tales of prostitution, jailhouse lesbianism, and botched abortions – made her into a cult figure in the late 1970s and 1980s, with VHS tapes of her speaking engagements becoming collector's items.

== Biography ==
Fisher was born in Brooklyn, New York to Morris Banz Fisher (1878–1971) and Pauline Ginsberg Fisher (1891–1983), both Lithuanian Jews. Her father was a life insurance salesman who immigrated in 1896.

Fisher said she had a series of short-lived marriages. She describes being married at least four separate times: first in a family-arranged marriage to a childhood friend named Joe Rosinsky; next, to her pimp, whom she identified in her autobiography as David Bohm; to a heroin junkie identified as Danny Orenstein, who claimed to be an insurance collector in Miami, Florida; and lastly, in 1968, to a Filipino sheet metal foreman named Manuel Bacolod, whom she initially met as a pen pal just prior to becoming a motivational speaker.

After an interview with David Susskind generated 100,000 letters, Susskind invited Fisher to appear on The Mike Douglas Show, which he co-hosted in 1969. Fisher then began speaking at schools and wrote the autobiography The Lonely Trip Back, which told of her life from childhood up to the point when she became a motivational speaker.

In 1970, she appeared in The Trip Back, a public service announcement recording of her appearance at a New York high school. Fisher's stories were often lurid or sensational, such as her assertion that she knew six men who had been sentenced to death at Sing Sing and Raiford Prison for committing six separate murders while under the influence of marijuana. During her time as a motivational speaker, Fisher was affiliated with the rehabilitation movement Synanon, which she credited with helping her beat her addiction. (Synanon was later described as one of the "most dangerous and violent cults America had ever seen"; it disbanded in 1991 after several members were convicted of offenses including financial misdeeds, evidence tampering, terrorism, and attempted murder.) She also had ties to Phoenix House, a sister organization of Synanon's, and often recommended it to students during her speeches as a reliable means of combating addictions.

Fisher died in Miami in 1972 from liver cancer, kidney failure and cardiac arrest.

A recording of one of Fisher's speaking engagements played an influential role on the creation of the television show Strangers With Candy and the character of Jerri Blank.
