= Tim Hill (filmmaker) =

American filmmaker

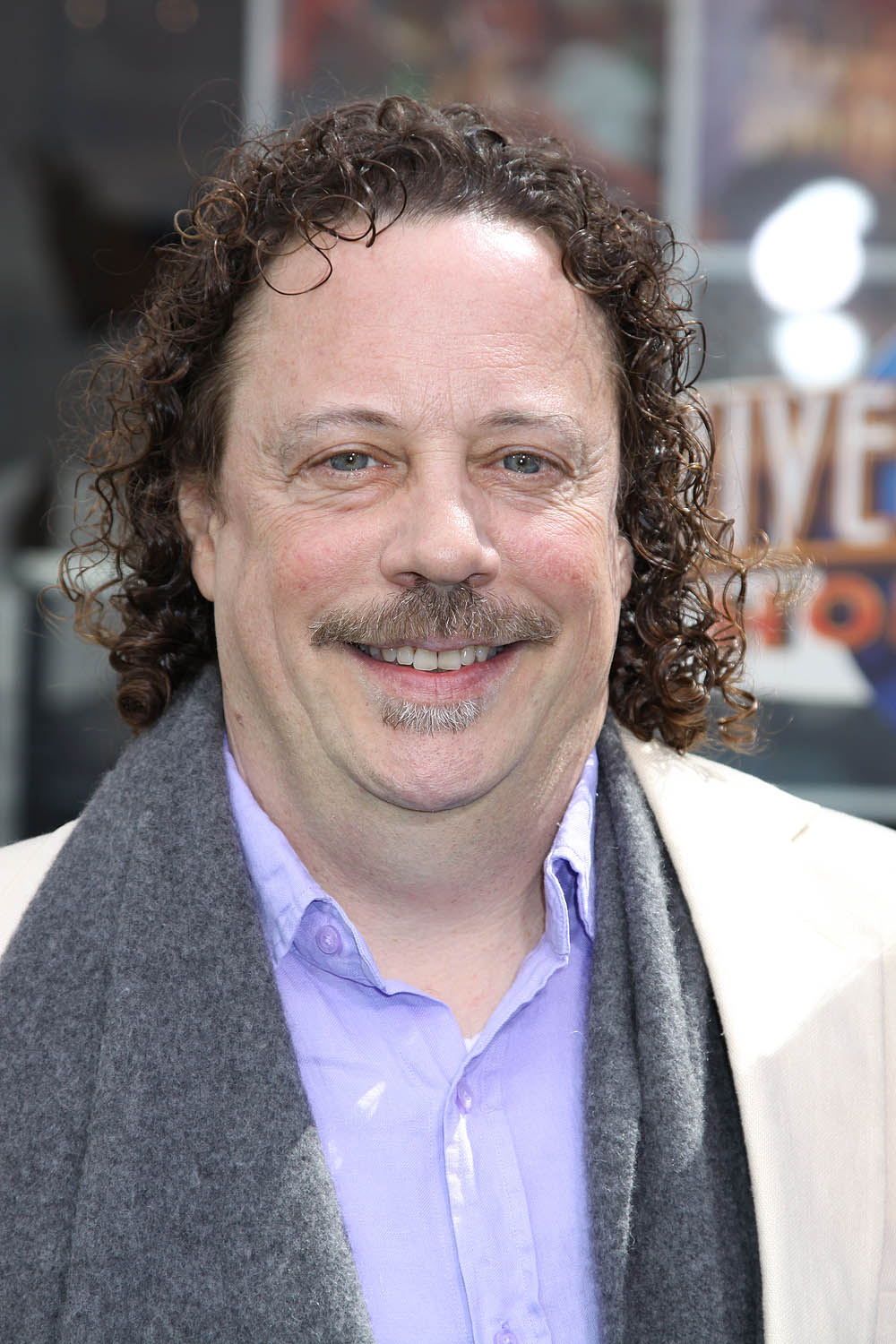
- Hill in 2011
- Occupations: Screenwriter; director; producer; storyboard artist
- Years active: 1991–present
- Spouse: Veronica Alicino (m. 1997)
- Relatives: George Roy Hill (uncle)

Tim Hill is an American screenwriter, director, producer, and former storyboard artist. He is best known as the co-developer and former story editor of the Nickelodeon animated series SpongeBob SquarePants (1999-present), directing the films Muppets from Space (1999), Max Keeble's Big Move (2001), Garfield: A Tail of Two Kitties (2006), Alvin and the Chipmunks (2007), Hop (2011), The SpongeBob Movie: Sponge on the Run (2020), and The War with Grandpa (2020).

== Career ==
Hill began his career in the 1990s as a writer for the show Rocko's Modern Life with Stephen Hillenburg and Derek Drymon, and was also a writer and producer on the shows Exit 57, KaBlam! and Kenny the Shark. Hill developed SpongeBob SquarePants with Drymon and art director Nick Jennings, and wrote the pilot episode as well as writing or co-writing four episodes for the first season. He also created the KaBlam! skit Action League Now!.

Hill directed the films Muppets from Space (1999), Max Keeble's Big Move (2001), Garfield: A Tail of Two Kitties (2006), Alvin and the Chipmunks (2007), Hop (2011) and The War with Grandpa (2020). Hill was a screenwriter for The SpongeBob SquarePants Movie (2004) and later co-wrote and directed The SpongeBob Movie: Sponge on the Run (2020).

== Personal life ==
Hill has been married to actress Veronica Alicino, whom he frequently casts in minor roles in his films, since June 24, 1997. He is the nephew of director George Roy Hill.

== Filmography ==
Film

Year	Title	Director	Writer	Notes
1997	Action League Now!!: Rock-A-Big-Baby	Yes	Yes	Short
1999	Muppets from Space	Yes	No	
2001	Max Keeble's Big Move	Yes	No	Also songwriter: "MacGoogle's Theme"
2004	The SpongeBob SquarePants Movie	No	Yes	Co-written with Derek Drymon, Stephen Hillenburg, Kent Osborne, Aaron Springer and Paul Tibbitt; Also storyboard artist and story editor
2006	Garfield: A Tail of Two Kitties	Yes	No	
2007	Alvin and the Chipmunks	Yes	No	
2011	Hop	Yes	No	
2020	The SpongeBob Movie: Sponge on the Run	Yes	Yes	Story co-written with Jonathan Aibel and Glenn Berger; Voice of "Documentary Narrator"
2020	The War with Grandpa	Yes	No	Filmed in 2017.

Television

Year	Title	Director	Writer	Producer	Notes
1991	Make the Grade	No	Yes	No	1 episode
1991–93	Welcome Freshmen	Yes	Yes	Executive	16 episodes (director); 43 episodes (writer)
1993–96	Rocko's Modern Life	No	Yes	No	27 episodes (writer); 13 episodes (story editor)
1995–96	Exit 57	Yes	No	No	6 episodes
1996–2000	KaBlam!	Yes	Yes	Yes	21 episodes (director); 18 episodes (writer); 30 episodes (producer)
1999; 2005–07	SpongeBob SquarePants	No	Yes	No	18 episodes; Also developer and story editor
2000	The War Next Door	No	Yes	No	Episode "Father Knows Death"
2001	Action League Now!	Yes	Yes	Yes	Episode "The Chief: Look Back in Anger"
2001–02	100 Deeds for Eddie McDowd	No	Yes	Supervising	4 episodes
2003–05	Kenny the Shark	No	Yes	No	3 episodes
2004	Whoopi's Littleburg	Yes	No	No	2 episodes
2014	Grumpy Cat's Worst Christmas Ever	Yes	Yes	No	TV movie
2017	Michael Jackson's Halloween	No	Yes	No	TV short

== Awards and nominations ==
Year	Award	Category	Film	Result
1995	CableACE Award	Best Comedy Series; Shared with Cindy Caponera, Stephen Colbert, Paul Dinello, John C. Fisher, Joe Forristal, Nancy Geller, Jodi Lennon, Mitch Rouse & Amy Sedaris	Exit 57	Nominated
2006	Annie Award	Best Writing in an Animated Television Production; Shared with Mike Bell, C.H. Greenblatt & Paul Tibbitt	SpongeBob SquarePants	Won
