= Sarah Thyre =

American actress

- Occupations: Actress; writer
- Years active: 1998–present
- Spouse: Andy Richter (m. 1994; div. 2019)
- Children: 2

Sarah Thyre is an American actress and writer. She played the role of Coach Cherri Wolf on the television show Strangers with Candy.

== Early life ==
Thyre is the second of five children in a Roman Catholic family. She was raised in Kansas City and Louisiana. After her parents' divorce, she and her four siblings lived with their mother and struggled with poverty.

== Personal life ==
Thyre wrote a memoir about her childhood entitled Dark at the Roots published by Counterpoint. Thyre married comedian and television sidekick Andy Richter in 1994. The couple had two children, a son born in 2000 and a daughter born in 2005, before divorcing in 2019.

== Filmography ==
=== Film ===
Year	Title	Role	Notes
1998	The Thin Pink Line	Diane Edbetter-Irpine	
2005	Strangers with Candy	Coach Wolf	
2012	Hotel Transylvania	Additional voices	
2014	Jason Nash Is Married	Sarah	
2021	Marcel the Shell with Shoes On	Catherine (voice)	

=== Television ===
Year	Title	Role	Notes
1998	Upright Citizens Brigade	Angry Protester / Gretel	2 episodes
1999–2000	Strangers with Candy	Coach Cherri Wolf / Jerri's Step-Mom	14 episodes
2008–11	The Mighty B!	Mrs. Gibbons	24 episodes
2011	Childrens Hospital	Mother	Episode: "Father's Day"
2014–17	All Hail King Julien	Becca, Dorothy, various roles	32 episodes
