= Peter Lauer =

American television director

- Occupations: Music video director, television director
- Years active: 1988–present

Peter Lauer is an American music video and television director.

He directed the music videos "Run's House" for Run-DMC and edited "It Takes Two" for Rob Base and DJ E-Z Rock.

Lauer made his television directorial debut in 1993, directing an episode of The Adventures of Pete & Pete. He has since directed episodes of The Secret World of Alex Mack, Strangers with Candy, Dead Like Me, Arrested Development, Malcolm in the Middle, Chuck, Scrubs, Wonderfalls, Remember WENN, Sons of Tucson, and the Nickelodeon film Cry Baby Lane among other series. In 2014, Lauer directed episodes of Awkward and Finding Carter. From 2016 to 2019, he directed eight episodes of the teacher sitcom Those Who Can't.
