= Larc Spies =

American actor

- Occupation: Actor
- Years active: 1994–2010

Larc Fletcher Spies is an American actor who is best known for playing Derrick Blank, half-brother to main character Jerri Blank, on the comedy TV series Strangers with Candy (but the role was played in the movie by Joseph Cross).

== Career ==
Larc Spies begin his acting career in 1994, he got his first acting credit as Ned Richmond in the Nickelodeon television series The Adventures of Pete & Pete. His other live action acting credits include Stel in Star Trek: Enterprise, Henry in The Definite Maybe and Kenneth in Cry Baby Lane.

Spies is also a voice actor in animation and video games, with roles in Welcome to Eltingville, What's New, Scooby-Doo?, Jade Empire and Lost Planet 2. He provided the voice of the custom skater in Tony Hawk's Underground, and the English dub voice of Null in Metal Gear Solid: Portable Ops.

== Filmography ==
=== Film ===
Year	Title	Role	Notes
1997	The Definite Maybe	Henry	
2008	Metal Gear Solid 2: Digital Graphic Novel	Cyborg Ninja (voice)	Direct-to-video
2008	Metal Gear Solid 2: Blade Dessinee	Mr. X (voice)	Direct-to-video

=== Television ===
Year	Title	Role	Notes
1994	The Adventures of Pete & Pete	Ned Richmond	Episode: "Halloweenie"
1999–2000	Strangers with Candy	Derrick Blank, Jerri's Step-Brother	29 episodes
2000	Cry Baby Lane	Kenneth	Television film
2002	Welcome to Eltingville	Pete DiNunzio, Sekowsky (voices)	
2002	What's New, Scooby-Doo?	Andy Dinwiddie (voice)	Episode: "It's Mean, It's Green, It's the Mystery Machine"
2004	Star Trek: Enterprise	Stel	Episode: "The Forge"

=== Video games ===
Year	Title	Role	Notes
2003	Tony Hawk's Underground	Male Player	
2004	Tony Hawk's Underground 2	Male Player Voice #1	
2005	Jade Empire	Creative Yukong, Additional voices	
2006	Metal Gear Solid: Portable Ops	Null	
2008	SOCOM U.S. Navy SEALs: Confrontation	Brad Nelson	
2010	Lost Planet 2	Additional voices	
