= Exit 57 =

Television series

- Volume one box cover
- Genre: Sketch comedy; Surreal comedy; Alternative comedy
- Created by: Stephen Colbert; Paul Dinello; Mitch Rouse; Amy Sedaris
- Directed by: Tim Hill; Mick Napier
- Starring: Stephen Colbert; Paul Dinello; Jodi Lennon; Mitch Rouse; Amy Sedaris
- Opening theme: If I Knew You Were Comin' I'd've Baked a Cake
- Country of origin: United States
- Original language: English
- No. of episodes: 12

Production
- Running time: 30 minutes

Original release
- Network: Comedy Central
- Release: February 8, 1995 – 1996

Exit 57 is a 30-minute sketch comedy series that aired on the American television channel Comedy Central from 1995 to 1996; its original timeslot was Sundays at 10:00 p.m., but was later moved to Tuesdays at 9:00 p.m. The cast was composed of comedians Stephen Colbert, Paul Dinello, Jodi Lennon, Mitch Rouse, and Amy Sedaris, all of whom had previously studied improv at The Second City in Chicago. In 1999 Sedaris, Dinello, Colbert and Rouse also created the Comedy Central show Strangers with Candy.

All of the sketches in the series are implied to take place in the fictionalized suburban setting of the Quad Cities.

== Premise ==
The episodes usually run for around 20 minutes, and feature between four and seven sketches. The sketches all take place in a fictional setting, vaguely named Quad Cities, in reference to the real-life region between Iowa and Illinois.

== Development ==
=== Conception ===
Sedaris, Dinello, and Rouse were initially approached about developing a sketch comedy show for HBO Downtown Productions after appearing in a comic play titled Stitches written by Sedaris's brother David. The show was produced for Comedy Central by Joe Forristal and Nancy Geller. Sedaris and Dinello asked for Colbert's involvement, and he left The Second City, where they all met, so he could move to New York City and work on the show. During his time on New York, Colbert lived at the General Theological Seminary in Chelsea. Jodi Lennon, who attended the Second City training center with Rouse, was asked to audition for the show. She put a tape together, and later the other cast members went to see her perform at The Annoyance Theatre, after that she was hired and moved to New York.

=== Writing and production ===
Colbert, Dinello, Rouse and Sedaris, called their The Second City's director, Mick Napier, to help them with the show's structure. "It was the first show we'd ever done, and the person we had worked with and trusted the most to understand our style of comedy was Mick, so we said, 'Would you come in and just look at our scripts and help us figure out what we're trying to say? What's the proper structure for this scene?' Because we weren't as good as that." Colbert recalled. Their shared dark sensibilities were also a factor in bringing him on the project. All of them wrote for the show, they would first improvise together in a room and someone would take notes. The team recalled having a lot of freedom to write, "They left us alone for 4 months at a time to write. Then we would come back and use what ever we had come up with." Colbert and Dinello would write most of the sketches, with David Sedaris mainly writing for Lennon and Amy. Lennon said that Sedaris' material was more like "little plays", rather than a normal sketch. The group would do weekly read-throughs, and do re-writes. Sedaris wouldn't take notes kindly, so he would just come each time with a brand new sketch. He wrote all his scripts on a typewriter. Napier alongside, Cindy Caponera, Paul Kozlowski, A. Whitney Brown, and David Pasquesi, contributed additional material. Comedy writer Michael O'Donoghue once wrote a sketch for the show, but it was rejected due to its violence. Donoghue died in 1994 and the sixth episode of the first season is dedicated to his memory. Colbert has said "Down In the Basement", is one of his favorite sketches from the show, and described it as "one of the most Mick things that we ever did". For the sketch "You Are Fired", Colbert based his character on Second City producer Kelly Leonard, who did not like having difficult conversations with his staff. Colbert called Leonard beforehand to tell him.

The series was filmed in New York, at the HBO Downtown Production offices, in front of a live audience. They only were able to film two takes per sketch. Colbert recalled the budget for the show was tight: "Those were like, "Well, here's an idea. A guy gets woken up by a jackhammer. The jackhammer operator ..." and our producers would say, "First of all, before you go any further – do you have a jackhammer? Because I don't have a jackhammer." Lennon recalled that HBO was very supportive, asking them to write another pilot after the show was cancelled. They ended up writing another sketch show, but it did not get picked up.

== Opening sequence ==
During the show's cryptic opening sequence, the cast members are seen standing next to a broken down car on the highway. Soon they are picked up by a passing driver, who changes the radio station at the mention of a serial killer, and takes Polaroid pictures of his increasingly uncomfortable passengers. Growing suspicious, the cast demands to be let out. The car is then seen pulling off the highway at Exit 57.

A rendition of "If I Knew You Were Comin' I'd've Baked a Cake" served as the show's theme song.

== Cast members ==
- Stephen Colbert – Various
- Paul Dinello – Various
- Mitch Rouse – Various
- Amy Sedaris – Various
- Jodi Lennon – Various

=== Guest actors ===
- Cindy Caponera – Various

== Series overview ==
Season	Episodes	Originally aired	
Season	Episodes	First aired	Last aired
Pilot episode		Unaired	
1	6	August 20, 1995	1995
2	6	September 17, 1996	1996

== Reception ==
In a 1995 review of the show, The Boston Phoenix, wrote: "They're big on white-trash parody and fare particularly well with character-driven comedy and dialogue —a good sign." The review described the opening credits, as "The best sequence on the show," adding, "A David Lynch—ian dark subtext can be self-conscious, but sharp wit is evident, and the show has a lot of promise." For The New York Times, John J. O'Connor wrote, "As in any sketch-comedy format, some of the material sinks without a trace. But enough has stayed afloat for Comedy Central to order six more editions of Exit 57 ". For the same publication, Warren Berger compared the show to Saturday Night Live, "but edgier and with a Kids in the Hall bent". He also noted their favorite subjects included, "dysfunctional families" and "confrontational therapy that goes too far".

Despite having 12 episodes over the course of two seasons, the series met with a fair amount of critical acclaim before its cancellation, garnering CableACE nominations in 1995 for writing, performance, and best comedy series. In a 2003 interview, Stephen Colbert was told that it was a shame that the show did not have re-runs, to which he said: "I don't know about that, I've seen some of them since. I think shame could be associated with it, but not necessarily with not showing." Actor Matthew McConaughey is a fan of the show, and in 2017 he re-enacted a sketch with Colbert.
