= Cry Baby Lane =

2000 Nickelodeon television film

- Original 2000 SNICK broadcast/the Cry Baby Lane title card with its original rating
- Genre: Adventure; Comedy; Horror; Fantasy
- Written by: Peter Lauer; Bob Mittenthal
- Directed by: Peter Lauer
- Starring: Jase Blankfort; Trey Rogers; Frank Langella
- Theme music composer: Andrew Barrett
- Country of origin: United States
- Original language: English

Production
- Producers: Albie Hecht; Jerry Kupfer
- Editor: Doug Able
- Running time: 70 minutes
- Production companies: Centre Street Productions; Constant Communications; Flying Mallet, Inc. Nickelodeon
- Budget: $800,000

Original release
- Network: Nickelodeon
- Release: October 28, 2000

Cry Baby Lane is a Nickelodeon television film that premiered on October 28, 2000. The film was never aired outside the United States nor dubbed into other languages. It was not rebroadcast until 2011 and has never received a home media release. Similar to the 2003 Nickelodeon film The Electric Piper and the 2011 Cartoon Network film Johnny Bravo Goes to Bollywood, this was also considered a lost film for over a decade since its original airing in 2000 during SNICK's Halloween special that was hosted by Melissa Joan Hart. Nickelodeon began receiving letters written by the angry parents of children and the film was widely believed to be withheld from re-release because of controversies surrounding this film, but a Nickelodeon representative stated that the film had been merely forgotten. In 2011, a copy was discovered on Reddit and the ensuing reaction prompted TeenNick to re-air the film on October 31, 2011.

== Plot ==
Andrew and his older brother Carl enjoy listening to ghost stories that the local undertaker, Mr. Bennett, tells them. One night Bennett tells the tale of a local farmer whose wife gave birth to conjoined twins, one being good-natured while the other was clearly evil. The farmer, ashamed of them, kept the twins locked in their room. Eventually the twins got sick from a liver disease and died together, so the farmer sawed them in half and buried the good twin in a cemetery and the bad twin in a shallow grave near the house, at the end of an old dirt road called Cry Baby Lane, as whoever is caught out there at night will hear the cries of the deceased twin. Later, Andrew, Carl and a group of friends decide to hold a séance in the cemetery where the good twin is supposedly buried, but during the séance, a weed is cut near the grave and a creepy phenomenon occurs around the town soon afterwards. When Andrew consults Mr. Bennett about it, he confesses that when the twins were separated, the bodies were mixed up, with the good one being buried in the field and the bad one being buried in the grave where the séance took place, and that he knows this because he was the undertaker who separated the bodies. Therefore, the good twin is crying for help - not vengeance, and the bad twin possesses nearly everyone in town, and it is up to Andrew to stop him. Bennett's assistant Gary informs him of a legend, which he himself believes is just superstition, that weeds near people's graves in fact contain their souls, which are then set free if the weed is cut.

However, during the time Andrew and Carl journey into Cry Baby Lane, the evil twin intervenes and possesses Carl who then tries to attack his brother. The evil twin, speaking for Carl, tells Andrew he cannot stop his doing as the cries of the good twin become louder and more desperate. Andrew eventually escapes the evil twin's spell and journeys into the good twin's grave where he must cut a root that was wrapped around the good twin's skeleton in order to regain peace. The evil twin showers dirt onto the grave, attempting to bury Andrew alive, but Andrew manages to cut the root and save the good twin. The evil twin disappears in a flash of light and everybody returns to normal.

The next day, Andrew wakes up outside of the grave, where he finds the good twin's grave with flowers, alluding to the twin now being at peace. Andrew then picks a flower from the grave and gives it to Kathy as they leave Cry Baby Lane.

== Cast and crew ==
Cry Baby Lane was filmed in Kingston, New Jersey, with a few scenes in Tontogany, Ohio. It was produced by Albie Hecht and Jerry Kupfer. The editor was Doug Able, and John Inwood served as the director of photography. The supporting cast included:

- Jase Blankfort as Andrew
- Trey Rogers as Carl
- Larc Spies as Kenneth
- Frank Langella as Bennett
- Anne Lange as Ann Weber
- Marc John Jefferies as Hall
- Allison Siko as Louise
- Jessica Brooks Grant as Megan
- Sheri Drach as Kathy
- Gary Perez as Gary
- Steve Mellor as Dick Weber
- Bernadette Quigley as Mrs. Hunt
- Carl Burrows as Evil Sheriff
- Jim Gaffigan as Bob
- Rob Newton as Evil Twin
- Andie K. Taylor as Becky
- Charlotte Mittenthal as Baby

== Production ==
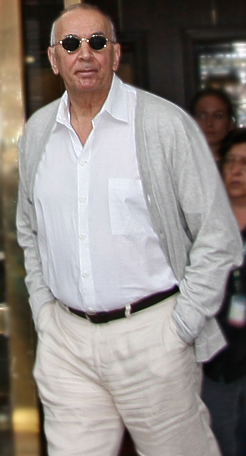
Nickelodeon insisted on the casting of Frank Langella for the role of the caretaker.

The film was originally envisioned as a $10 million theatrical release for Nickelodeon, but it was instead ordered to be a made-for-television movie with a budget of $800,000. The film was shot in the Village of Kingston in New Jersey in a little over twenty days with an extra day of shooting in Ohio for shots of the town. The director originally wanted Tom Waits for the role of the caretaker, but Nickelodeon insisted on Frank Langella in hopes that it would garner extra publicity.

== Availability ==
After its initial 2000 broadcast, the film was not re-aired or released to home media. Cry Baby Lane was thought to be a lost film and gained a cult following due to its obscurity. A search began for the lost film, and in August 2011, a Reddit user recovered a VHS copy recorded from the film's original broadcast on the night of October 28, 2000, and made it available online. Director Peter Lauer was interviewed soon after and said that he was surprised and flattered by the attention his film had gotten 11 years after its original release, being unaware of its supposed banning by Nickelodeon: "I just assumed they didn't show it again because they didn't like it! I did it, I thought it failed, and I moved on." A Nickelodeon representative later claimed that the film was never banned; it was just forgotten.

The reaction from Reddit, as well as the success of the '90s Are All That, prompted TeenNick to re-air Cry Baby Lane on the night of October 31, 2011. It reran again on March 31, 2015, as part of a week of specials on the '90s Are All That. It was promoted as being banned from television. On October 31, 2015, it was rerun on the block, now called the Splat. It also aired on the same block on October 31, 2016. It aired again on July 8, 2017 and October 20, 2017.

== See also ==
- List of Nickelodeon original films
- List of rediscovered films
- List of creepypastas
