= After school special =

American television films dealing with youth issues

DVD release for Martin Tahse's After School Specials from 1979 to 1980

An after school special is a television film, usually dealing with controversial or socially relevant issues, that were generally broadcast in the late afternoon and meant to be viewed by school-age children, particularly teenagers. The term comes from the title of the ABC Afterschool Special, an anthology series of films that debuted on ABC in 1972 and ran until 1996. The specials were generally broadcast four to six times during the school year, pre-empting local programming that would usually follow the network schedule in the late afternoon hours.

== Series ==
In addition to ABC's series, CBS distributed its own series of films under the name CBS Schoolbreak Special (originally called the CBS Afternoon Playhouse), which were produced from 1978 to 1996, while NBC aired after-school programs under the umbrella title Special Treat from 1975 to 1986.

== Legacy ==
The cult TV show Strangers with Candy and its 2005 feature film adaptation, featuring Amy Sedaris as an ex-con, prostitute, and junkie, spoofs after-school special conventions.

== See also ==
- Degrassi (franchise)
- 13 Reasons Why
- Last of the Curlews – The very first ABC Afterschool Special (1972), and one of a very few animated ones.
- Public information film – In the UK, extended versions of these were shown in schools. These were often about safety.
- Schoolhouse Rock!
- Very special episode
- WonderWorks – Produced several after-school-type specials for PBS
