= Roberto Gari =

American artist and actor

- Born: February 13, 1920; New York City, U.S.
- Died: January 22, 2008 (aged 87); New York City, U.S.
- Education: Art Students League of New York
- Occupations: Artist; actor
- Spouse: Janet Cantor (m. 1949; div. 1967)
- Children: 2
- Relatives: Eddie Cantor (father in-law)

Roberto Gari (February 13, 1920 – January 22, 2008) was an American artist and actor. He was born in Brooklyn and appeared in vaudeville under the name of Jackie Hayes from the age of 4. He was best known for his role as Guy Blank, Jerri Blank's father, in the cult Comedy Central series Strangers with Candy.

== Early life ==
Gari was born on February 13, 1920, in Brooklyn, New York, to parents Joseph and Gina Garratano, who owned a store in Manhattan. His mother Gina died on May 18, 1930, when he was ten years old.

== Career ==
=== Artistic career ===
In 1939 Gari enrolled and studied at the Art Students League of New York under the auspices of such renowned instructors as Will Barnet and Ethel Schwabacher. Gari worked with oil on canvas, watercolor, charcoal, pastels, and pen and ink. His subjects were usually portraits, in Impressionist or Modernist style. He became a respected artist with numerous exhibitions in such galleries as the Bodley Gallery in NYC and the Raymond Burr and Acosta galleries in Beverly Hills. His paintings have been collected by such stars as Shelley Winters, Steve Allen, Debbie Reynolds, Eddie Fisher, Eddie Cantor and former President Ronald Reagan (who hung his Gari painting in the White House). His painting of singer Judy Garland was on display in the lobby of New York's Palace Theatre for many years and now hangs in the Theatre Collection of the Museum of the City of New York.

=== Show business career ===
Some of the highlights of Gari's show business career included dancing with Vera-Ellen in the Broadway production of 'A Connecticut Yankee' in 1944 and later as Merlin the magician in the same production. Other Broadway credits include 'Sadie Thompson' (with June Havoc) and Eddie Cantor's production of 'Nellie Bly'. During the 1950s he appeared on The Colgate Comedy Hour as well as the Four Star Revue. During the 1960s and 1970s his family commitments and his art work kept him away from performing; he returned in the 1980s and subsequently could be seen in such films as I.Q., The Associate, Scent of a Woman, She Devil and One Fine Day. He also had regular roles on television in the daytime soap operas Guiding Light (as Maurice the bartender) and Another World (as Alistair the butler from 1992 to 1995). He was also prominently featured on Candid Camera and The Last Mile on PBS. His final TV role was playing Amy Sedaris' father in a dozen episodes of the cult Comedy Central series Strangers with Candy.

== Personal life ==
Gari married Janet Cantor, daughter of performer Eddie Cantor, in December 1949. They had a son named Brian in 1952 and a daughter named Amanda. The couple later divorced in 1967.

Gari died of Myocardial infarction at age 87 on January 22, 2008.
