= Paul Dinello =

American comedian, actor, and writer (born 1962)

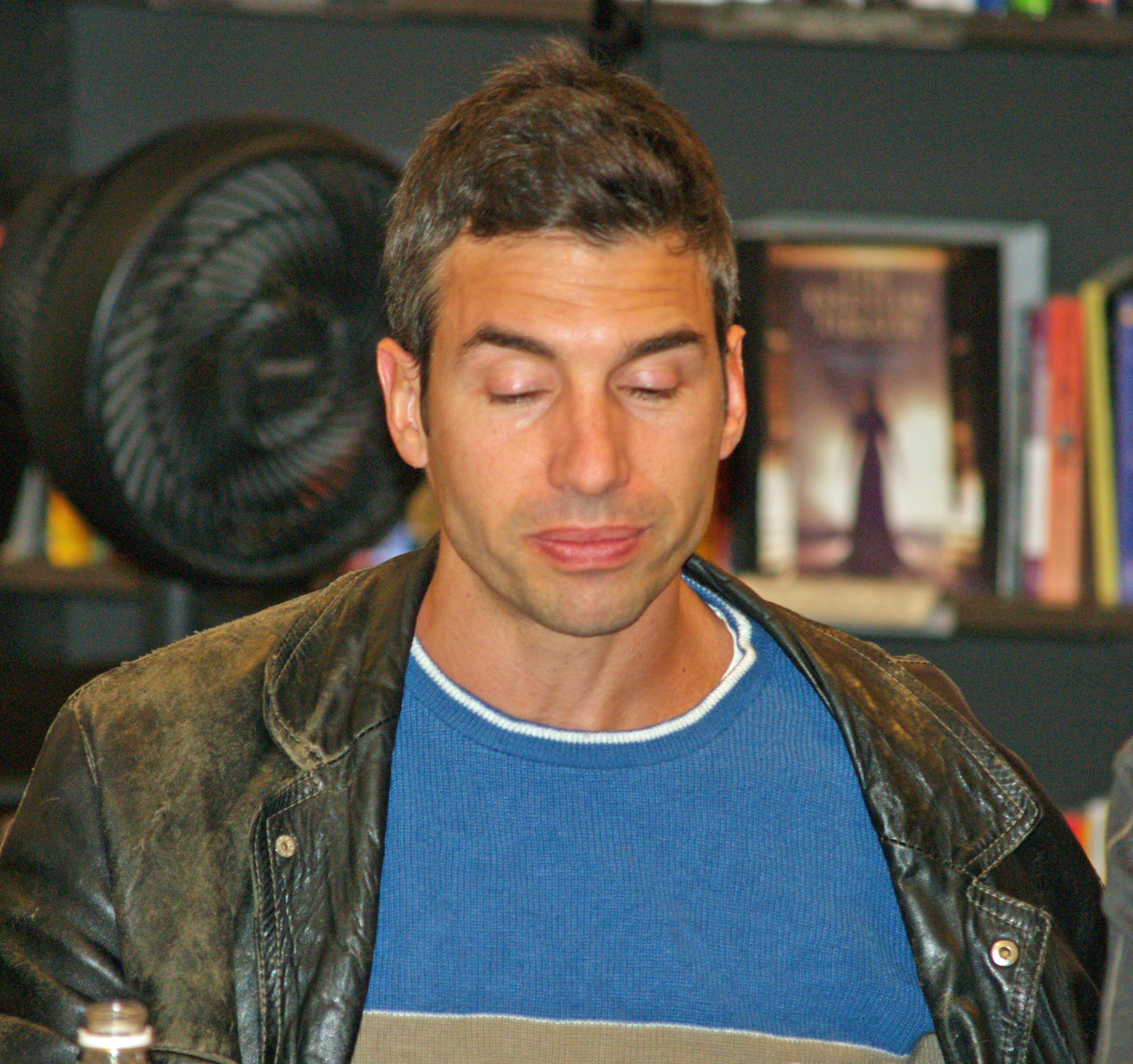
- Dinello in 2007
- Born: Paul E. Dinello; November 28, 1962 (age 63); Oak Park, Illinois, U.S.
- Education: DePaul University (BA)
- Occupations: Writer; comedian
- Years active: 1988–present
- Spouse: Danielle St. Laurent (m. 2011)
- Partner: Amy Sedaris (1987–1995)
- Children: 2

Paul E. Dinello (born November 28, 1962) is an American comedian, actor, and writer, best known for his collaborations with Stephen Colbert and Amy Sedaris. His accolades include five Primetime Emmy Awards, three PGA Awards, and two WGA Awards.

With Colbert and Sedaris, he co-created for Comedy Central the sketch comedy series Exit 57 (1995–1996) and the dark comedy Strangers with Candy (1999–2000), where he portrayed Geoffrey Jellineck. In 2003, they also wrote the satirical book Wigfield. In 2005, Dinello became a writer and supervising producer for The Colbert Report and then The Late Show with Stephen Colbert. In 2017, he co-created the truTV craft-oriented comedy At Home with Amy Sedaris, which ran for three seasons, until it was cancelled in 2021.

== Early life ==
Dinello was born in Oak Park, Illinois to Frank Anthony Dinello, the head of DePaul University's Mental Health Clinic, and Ann Lee Dinello (née Zeiler). He is the fourth of five siblings: Donna, Lori, Linda and David. He has said he had an "average middle class midwestern upbringing". His uncle Dan Dinello, who piqued his interest in directing, is an independent filmmaker and professor emeritus at Columbia College Chicago.

Dinello attended Oak Park River Forest High School and during that time used to get in trouble a lot: "I didn't do things to be mean, I did things to amuse people and they turned out to be rotten", he has said, recalling an incident where he blew up fireworks in the student center. After graduating, he enrolled in DePaul University, where he majored in Communications and English, while also taking film classes. Dinello did not particularly enjoy his major: "I knew that I was learning stuff I didn't have any interest in. It was good I'd say for winnowing out the things that I didn't want to do. It made it abundantly clear that I didn't want to have anything to do with Communications." He graduated from DePaul's College of Communications in 1985. Dinello worked at Allstate for a year, but quit to do stand-up. To support himself he worked as a cabbie and sold newspapers and office art.

== Career ==
=== Improv education: (1985–1994) ===
After college, Dinello attended an improv class at The Players Workshop. The first activity required him to close his eyes and find a partner, he was paired with Greg Hollimon. Dinello recalled, "We were told, “Get to know your partner, rub noses.” We were rubbing noses and I open my eyes and it's Greg—you know he's a six-foot-six bald black man. And I was like “Aah I'm quittin.” After that things got better." Along with two other classmates, they later formed an improv group called, The Yardstick Boys, and would often perform around Chicago "for beer money". He had also attended the Improv Institute and Annoyance Theatre.

After seeing a show at The Second City, he decided to take classes there and after a while was asked to audition. In the late 1980s, he was hired to perform with Second City's touring company. It was there where he met Amy Sedaris and Stephen Colbert with whom he often collaborated later in his career. By their retelling, the three comedians did not get along at first – Dinello thought Colbert was uptight, pretentious and cold, while Colbert thought of Dinello as "a semi-literate thug" – but the trio became close friends while touring together, discovering that they shared a similar comic sensibility. In 2003, Second City senior associate producer Beth Kligerman called him "the most handsome person to come out of 43 years of Second City." Dinello and Sedaris moved to New York City to star alongside Mitch Rouse and Becky Thyre in Stitches, a play written by Sedaris and her brother David, which premiered at La MaMa Experimental Theatre Club in 1994.

=== Exit 57 (1995–1996) ===
When he and Sedaris were offered the opportunity to create a television series for HBO Downtown Productions, Colbert left The Second City and moved to New York to work with them on the sketch comedy show Exit 57. The series debuted on Comedy Central in 1995 and aired through 1996. Although it lasted for only 12 episodes, the show received favorable reviews and was nominated for five CableACE Awards in 1995, in categories including best writing, performance, and comedy series.

=== Strangers with Candy (1999–2000) ===
A few years later, Dinello worked again with Sedaris and Colbert to develop Strangers with Candy. Comedy Central picked up the series in 1998. Strangers with Candy was conceived of as a parody of after school specials, following the life of Jerri Blank, a 46-year-old dropout who returns to finish high school after 32 years of life on the street. Most noted by critics for its use of offensive humor, it concluded each episode by delivering to the audience a skewed, politically incorrect moral lesson. Dinello served as a main writer with Sedaris and Colbert, and portrayed Jerri's naïve and self-centered art teacher, Geoffrey Jellineck, seen throughout the series not actually teaching anything to his classes. Dinello took inspiration for his character from a teacher he used to have in high school. Thirty episodes of Strangers with Candy were made, which aired on Comedy Central in 1999 and 2000. Though its ratings were not remarkable during its initial run, it has been characterized as a cult show with a small but dedicated audience. After the show ended, Dinello, Colbert and David Pasquesi penned "Trifecta", a comedy script that was bought by Artisan Entertainment. The film was intended to be directed by Dinello and star Colbert, Pasquesi, Sedaris and himself, but it did not come out of the development stage, as Dinello realized he did not like the script.

Dinello reprised his role of Geoffrey Jellineck for a film adaptation, which premiered at the Sundance Film Festival in 2005 and had a limited release in 2006. The film received mixed reviews. Dinello directed and produced the film as well as co-wrote the screenplay with Sedaris and Colbert.

=== Wigfield (2003) and The Colbert Report (2005–2014) ===
In 2003, Dinello co-wrote the novel Wigfield with Sedaris and Colbert, which they promoted by creating a traveling play. First pitched to Hyperion as a children's book about a worm searching for his identity. It later became a satirical story about a journalist, reporting on a small town on the verge of disappearing."

Since 2005 until the show's end in 2014, Dinello worked as a writer and supervising producer for The Colbert Report. He made some appearances as Tad, the building manager. The character often is berated by Colbert, who forces him to do dangerous things. In 2006 he helped Colbert with his speech at the White House Correspondents' Dinner, and together they revised it the night before the event. Of the speech's reception he commented: "I think that context gave it more weight than was intended. Had the president gone 'ha, ha, ha!' and slapped his knee and everyone laughed, I don't think there would be a lot of discussion about it." He also co-wrote alongside Colbert and other Report members, the book I Am America (And So Can You!) (2007), and its sequel, America Again (2012). He edited the audio version of the former.

In 2008, Dinello directed the Nickelodeon original movie Gym Teacher: The Movie, starring Christopher Meloni and Sedaris. That same year he had a bit part on Michel Gondry's Be Kind Rewind, where he plays a copyright lawyer, alongside Sigourney Weaver. Gondry asked Dinello directly to appear in the film. With Sedaris, Dinello co-wrote Simple Times: Crafts for Poor People, published in 2010. He can be seen with Sedaris in the "Mummified Hand" episode of the Science Channel show Oddities.

=== At Home with Amy Sedaris (2017–2021) ===
In 2017, he co-created the craft-oriented comedy At Home with Amy Sedaris.

=== The Late Show with Stephen Colbert (since 2015) ===
In 2015, along with the rest of The Colbert Report crew, he moved to The Late Show with Stephen Colbert working as a writer and supervising producer. He sometimes appears on camera helping Colbert with some of the show's segments or on the cold open sketches. Dinello is one of the people Colbert checks with to assess the quality of a piece, alongside Tom Purcell, Jon Stewart, and his wife Evie. His office is on the same floor as Colbert's so they can consult with each other easily. Dinello will next reunite with Sedaris for a remake of Roger Corman's science fiction film The Wasp Woman (1959). Dinello is set to write and direct the film with Sedaris starring.

== Influences ==
Dinello has said his creative influences include comedians Ernie Kovacs, Buster Keaton, Peter Sellers, Monty Python, The Three Stooges, Jack Lemmon; filmmakers Jean-Pierre Jeunet, Terry Gilliam, Federico Fellini, Luis Buñuel, Akira Kurosawa, Stanley Kubrick; and photographers: Diane Arbus and Mary Ellen Mark.

== Personal life ==
Dinello dated his Strangers with Candy co-star Amy Sedaris for eight years after they met at Second City.

Dinello met his wife, photographer Danielle St. Laurent, while working on the artwork for the book Simple Times: Crafts for Poor People. They married in 2011. The ceremony was officiated by his long-time friend Stephen Colbert, for whom he had served as best man. The couple has two sons. Sedaris is their godmother.

== Filmography ==
| Year | Film | Role | Notes |
|---|---|---|---|
| 1992 | Straight Talk | Casey | B-roll character |
| 1995–96 | Exit 57 | Various Characters | 12 episodes |
| 1999–2000 | Strangers with Candy | Geoffrey Jellineck | 29 episodes |
| 2005–2014 | The Colbert Report | Tad the Building Manager | Writer and supervising producer |
| 2005 | Strangers with Candy (movie) | Geoffrey Jellineck | Director and writer |
| 2008 | Be Kind Rewind | Mr. Rooney | |
| 2008 | Gym Teacher: The Movie | Mr. Tipple | Director |
| 2010 | Rally to Restore Sanity | - | Writer and consulting producer |
| 2015 | Difficult People | Paul | 1 episode |
| 2015–2026 | The Late Show with Stephen Colbert | Himself/Various Characters | Writer and supervising producer |
| 2017–2021 | At Home with Amy Sedaris | Various characters | Co-creator and writer |
| 2024 | Girls5Eva | Randy | 1 episode |

== Theatre ==
| Year | Title | Role | Venue | Ref. |
|---|---|---|---|---|
| 1994 | Stitches | Performer | La MaMa Experimental Theatre | |

== Awards and nominations ==
| Year | Award | Work | Result | Ref. |
|---|---|---|---|---|
| 1995 | CableACE Award for Comedy Series | Exit 57 | Nominated | |
| 2011 | Outstanding Special Class Special | Rally to Restore Sanity and/or Fear | Nominated | |
| 2011 | Outstanding Special Class Writing | Rally to Restore Sanity and/or Fear | Nominated | |
| 2011 | Outstanding Variety, Music or Comedy Series | The Colbert Report | Nominated | |
| 2011 | Outstanding Writing for a Variety, Music or Comedy Program | The Colbert Report | Nominated | |
| 2012 | Outstanding Variety Series | The Colbert Report | Nominated | |
| 2012 | Outstanding Writing for a Variety Series | The Colbert Report | Nominated | |
| 2013 | Outstanding Variety Series | The Colbert Report | Won | |
| 2013 | Outstanding Writing for a Variety Series | The Colbert Report | Won | |
| 2014 | Outstanding Variety Series | The Colbert Report | Won | |
| 2014 | Outstanding Writing for a Variety Series | The Colbert Report | Won | |
| 2015 | Outstanding Variety Talk Series | The Colbert Report | Nominated | |
| 2015 | Outstanding Writing for a Variety Series | The Colbert Report | Nominated | |
| 2017 | Outstanding Variety Special | Stephen Colbert's Live Election Night Democracy's Series Finale: Who's Going to Clean Up This Sh*t? | Nominated | |
| 2017 | Outstanding Writing for A Variety Special | Stephen Colbert's Live Election Night Democracy's Series Finale: Who's Going to Clean Up This Sh*t? | Nominated | |
| 2017 | Outstanding Variety Talk Series | The Late Show With Stephen Colbert | Nominated | |
| 2017 | Outstanding Writing for a Variety Series | The Late Show With Stephen Colbert | Nominated | |
| 2018 | Outstanding Variety Talk Series | The Late Show With Stephen Colbert | Nominated | |
| 2018 | Outstanding Writing for a Variety Series | The Late Show With Stephen Colbert | Nominated | |
| 2018 | Outstanding Variety Sketch Series | At Home with Amy Sedaris | Nominated | |
| 2019 | Outstanding Variety Talk Series | The Late Show With Stephen Colbert | Nominated | |
| 2019 | Outstanding Writing for a Variety Series | The Late Show With Stephen Colbert | Nominated | |
| 2020 | Outstanding Variety Talk Series | The Late Show With Stephen Colbert | Nominated | |
| 2020 | Outstanding Writing for a Variety Series | The Late Show With Stephen Colbert | Nominated | |
| 2021 | Outstanding Variety Talk Series | The Late Show With Stephen Colbert | Nominated | |
| 2021 | Outstanding Writing for a Variety Series | The Late Show With Stephen Colbert | Nominated | |
| 2021 | Outstanding Variety Special (Live) | Stephen Colbert’s Election Night 2020: Democracy’s Last Stand: Building Back America Great Again Better 2020 | Won | |
| 2021 | Outstanding Writing for a Variety Special | Stephen Colbert’s Election Night 2020: Democracy’s Last Stand: Building Back America Great Again Better 2020 | Nominated | |
| 2022 | Outstanding Variety Talk Series | The Late Show With Stephen Colbert | Nominated | |
| 2022 | Outstanding Writing for a Variety Series | The Late Show With Stephen Colbert | Nominated | |
| 2023 | Outstanding Writing for a Variety Series | The Late Show With Stephen Colbert | Nominated | |

== Published works ==
- Colbert, Dinello, Sedaris. Wigfield: The Can-Do Town That Just May Not (Hyperion, May 19, 2004) ISBN 0-7868-8696-X
- I Am America (And So Can You!) (Grand Central Publishing; October 9, 2007) ISBN 0-446-58050-3
- Sedaris & Dinello. Simple Times: Crafts for Poor People (Grand Central Publishing, November 2, 2010) ISBN 0-446-55704-8
- America Again (Grand Central Publishing; October 2, 2012) ISBN 0-446-58397-9
