= Carlo Alban =

Ecuadorian actor

Carlo Albán (born October 3, 1979) is an Ecuadorian actor, best known as "Carlo" from Sesame Street (1993–98). He played the role of Luis "McGrady" Gallego on Prison Break (2007–08). He has since gone on to perform in a variety of mediums, including plays and television shows.

== Early life ==
Albán arrived in the U.S. at the age of 7 with his family on a travel visa. However, his family intended to stay in the United States despite the potential consequences, living on an expired visa with the risk of deportation always prevalent. When he was 12 he got his first role in Oliver! as the title character. He then went on to other roles in New York until he was cast on Sesame Street.

Raised in Sayreville, New Jersey, Albán graduated from Sayreville War Memorial High School in 1996; he was inducted into the school's hall of fame in 2019. He attended Rutgers University, majoring in visual arts.

=== Sesame Street ===
Albán was on Sesame Street from 1993 to 1998, during which time he was undocumented. In response to lacking proper documentation, he said, "what better place to hide than in the spotlight where no one would suspect you?" Albán wrote an autobiographical solo play Intríngulis, in which he relates his experience growing up as an undocumented immigrant.

== Career ==
=== Film & Television ===
He has had recurring roles in Strangers with Candy, Thicker Than Blood, and The Tavern. He has guest starred on Law & Order, The Jury, Touched by an Angel, the HBO prison-themed series Oz, Deadline, Law & Order: Criminal Intent and in Prison Break as Luis "McGrady" Gallego. He played "Birdman" in the film Whip It.

=== Theater ===
Albán has made appearances on the stage, including multiple Off-Broadway shows and on Broadway in Sweat. He originated the role of Oscar in the world premiere production of Sweat at the Oregon Shakespeare Festival in 2015.

=== Sweat ===
Alban starred in Sweat, the Pulitzer Prize Winner for Drama 2017. Sweat ran on Broadway through June 2017 and tackles the issues that a group of friends and coworkers must deal with as their jobs are threatened.

== Filmography ==
Production	Date	Role
Black Bird	2022	Chris Drysdale
Mile 22	2018	CIA Officer William "Dougie" Douglas III
The Night Of (TV Mini-Series)	2016	
H.O.M.E.	2016	Manny
Sleeping with Other People	2015	Microcenter Employee
Palladium (Short)	2014	Stefon Alexander
The Bravest, the Boldest (Short)	2014	Chaplain Lieutenant Torres
Girls (TV Series)	2014	
The Sonnet Project (TV Series)	2013	
Cannonball Beautiful (Short)	2011	Bear
Margaret	2011	Rodrigo
The Big Deal (Short)	2011	Auggie
Hector is Gonna Kill Nate (Short)	2010	Hector
Whip It	2009	Birdman
Fringe (TV Series)	2008	FBI Tech Agent
Glow Ropes: The Rise and Fall of a Bar Mitzvah Emcee	2008	Barry
Prison Break (TV Series)	2007-2008	McGrady
The Tape Recorder (Short)	2007	Man
Life Support (TV Movie)	2007	Andre
Dentist Visit (Short)	2007	Juan
Live Free or Die	2006	Todd Thomas
Law & Order: Criminal Intent (TV Series)	2005	James Raphael
Strangers with Candy	2005	Megawatti
The Jury (TV Series)	2004	Douglas Santago
21 Grams	2003	Lucio
Snipes	2001	Bugsy
Deadline (TV Series)	2000	Manny
Center Stage	2000	Eva's Friend
Law & Order (TV Series)	1996-2000	Ramon Soriano / Damien
Touched by an Angel (TV Series)	1999	Tino Morante
The Tavern	1999	Tommy
Oz (TV Series)	1999	Luis Ricardo
Hi-Life	1998	Ricky
Thicker Than Blood (TV Movie)	1998	Lee Cortez
Sesame Street (TV Series)	1993-1998	Carlo
Hurricane Streets	1997	Benny
Imagine That! (Video short)	1996	Carlo
Sesame Street: Cookie Monster's Best Bites (Video)	1995	

== Performances ==
=== Regional Theatre Productions ===
Title	Venue
Sweat	OSF, Public Theater, Broadway
A Parallelogram	Center Theatre Group
Lydia	Denver, Yale, Center Theatre Group
Hurricane	Asolo Repertory Theatre
All About Us	Westport
Dreamlandia	Dallas Theatre Center
Night of the Iguana	Guthrie Theater

=== New York Productions ===
Title	Venue
Tamburlaine Parts I & II	Theatre for a New Audience
Intríngulis	Solo show - writer/performer
A Small Melodramatic Story	Labyrinth Theater Company
References to Salvador Dali Make Me Hot	The Public Theater, NYSF
A Summer Day	Rattlestick Playwrights Theater
Alice in Slasherland, Living Dead in Denmark	Vampire Cowboys
Flipzoids	Ma-Yi

== Awards and nominations ==
For television, Alban has been nominated for two Young Artist Awards for his work in Touched by an Angel and Thicker Than Blood. He also received a nomination for an ALMA award for his work in Thicker Than Blood, and Thicker Than Blood received an ALMA award for Outstanding Made-For-Television Movie or Mini-Series. He has also received the New Dramatists' Charles Bowden Award, and a 2017 Theatre World Award for an outstanding Broadway debut for Sweat.
