= Deborah Rush =

American actress (born 1954)

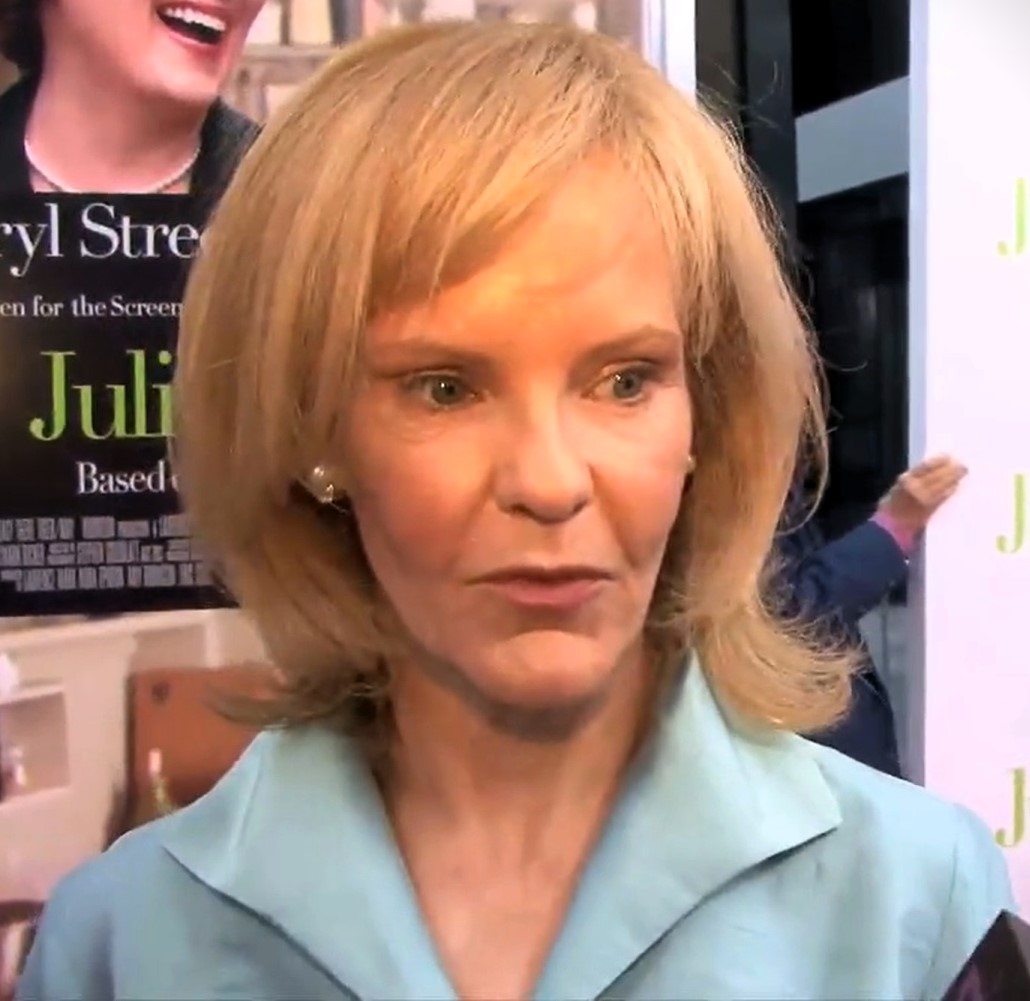
- Rush interviewed in 2009
- Born: April 10, 1954 (age 72); Chatham Borough, New Jersey, U.S.
- Occupation: Actress
- Years active: 1975–present
- Spouse: Chip Cronkite (m. 1985)
- Children: 2
- Relatives: Walter Cronkite (father-in-law)

Deborah Rush (born April 10, 1954) is an American actress. She has worked in television, film and on Broadway. In 1984, she was nominated for a Tony Award for Best Performance by a Featured Actress in a Play for Michael Frayn's comedy Noises Off.

== Life and career ==
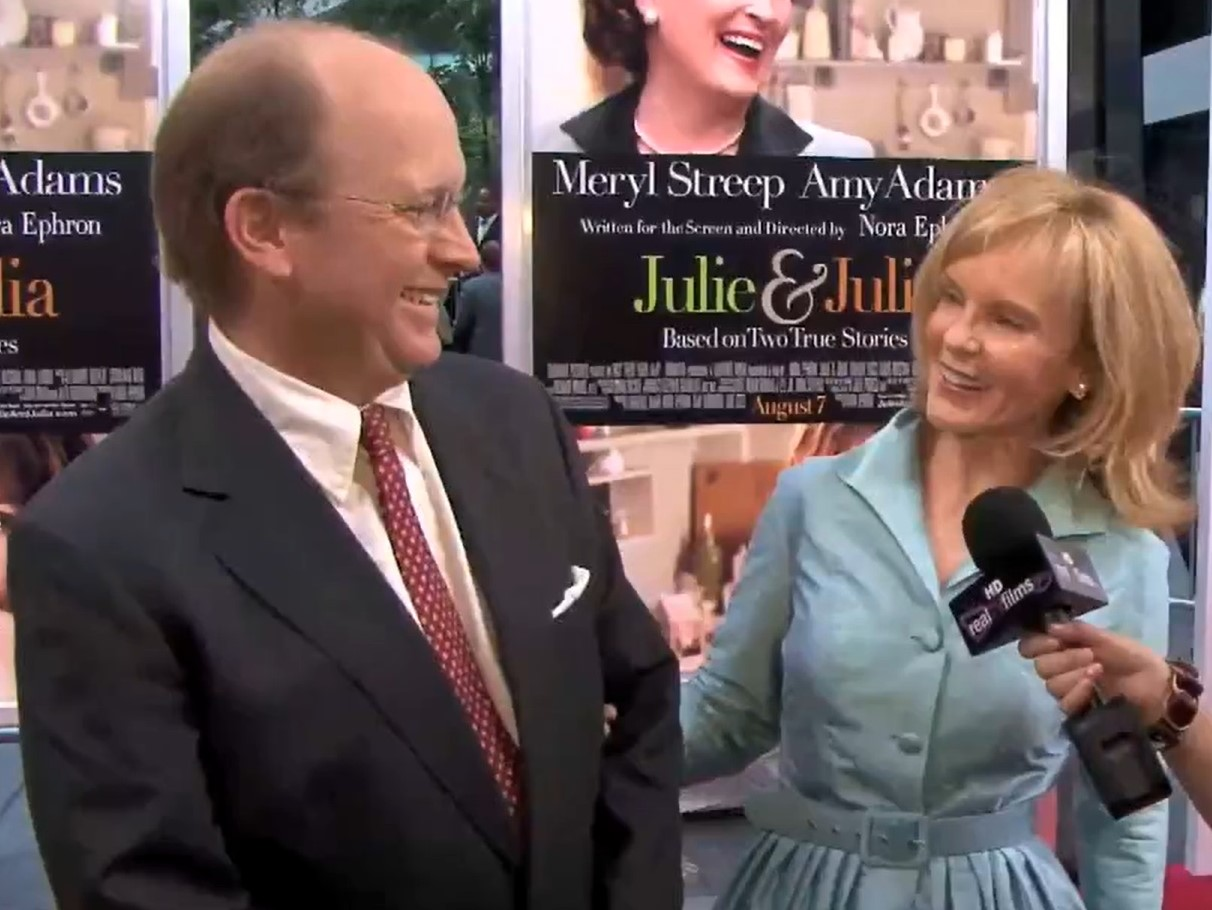
Rush and husband Walter "Chip" Cronkite III interviewed in 2009

Rush was born in Chatham Borough, New Jersey, to Joseph G. Rush, a newspaper editor, and Mary Conley Rush. She is married to Walter Cronkite III (born April 22, 1957) and daughter-in-law of the late television journalist Walter Cronkite. The couple has two sons, Walter Cronkite IV and the late Peter Cronkite.

Rush made her Broadway debut performing in the 1975 musical Dance with Me. She later appeared in films Oliver's Story (1978), 10 (1979) and Honky Tonk Freeway (1981), and made-for-television productions Alice at the Palace and A Midsummer Night's Dream in 1982. From 1983 to 1984 she starred as Brooke Ashton in Noises Off, a role gained her Drama Desk Award and a Tony Award for Best Featured Actress in a Play nomination. Also in 1983, Rush starred in the satirical mockumentary comedy film, Zelig written and directed by Woody Allen. She later appeared in another Woody Allen's film, The Purple Rose of Cairo (1985). During the 1980s, Rush also appeared in films such as Compromising Positions (1985), Heat (1986), Big Business (1988), Parents (1989) and Family Business (1989). On stage, Rush also acted in Hay Fever, The Sisters Rosensweig, and Stephen Adly Guirgis' The Last Days of Judas Iscariot.

In 1990s, Rush played number of supporting roles in films such as My Blue Heaven (1990), In & Out (1997), You've Got Mail (1998) and Three to Tango (1999). On television, she played Isabel Hazard in the 1994 miniseries, Heaven & Hell: North & South, Book III and had a recurring role in the ABC sitcom Spin City as Helen Winston, eventual ex-wife of mayor Randall Winston. From 1999 to 2000, Rush was a regular cast member of the Comedy Central comedy series, Strangers with Candy starring Amy Sedaris. She reprised her role in the 2005 prequel film, Strangers with Candy. In 2002 she co-starred opposite Jennifer Aniston in the comedy-drama film, The Good Girl and the following year appeared in the comedy film American Wedding, as Mary Flaherty, Michelle Flaherty's mom. She played Ryan Gosling's mother in the 2006 drama film, Half Nelson, and starred as Avis DeVoto in the 2009 biographical comedy-drama film, Julie & Julia written and directed by Nora Ephron. In December 2008, she joined the cast of the Broadway revival of Blithe Spirit.

In 2010, Rush was regular cast member in the short-lived Comedy Central sitcom, Big Lake. She also made guest appearances in television series such as Law & Order: Special Victims Unit, The Good Wife, Inside Amy Schumer and The Blacklist. From 2013 to 2019 she had a recurring role in the Netflix comedy-drama series, Orange Is the New Black, as Piper Chapman's mother, Carol Chapman.

== Filmography ==
=== Film ===
Year	Title	Role	Notes
1978	Oliver's Story	1st Girl in Bar	
1979	10	Dental Assistant	
1981	Honky Tonk Freeway	Sister Mary Magdalene	
1982	Split Image	Judith	
1983	Zelig	Lita Fox	
1983	A Night in Heaven	Patsy	
1985	The Purple Rose of Cairo	Rita	
1985	Compromising Positions	Brenda Dunck	
1986	Heat	D.D.	
1988	Big Business	Binky Shelton	
1989	Parents	Mrs. Zellner	
1989	She-Devil	People reporter	
1989	Family Business	Michele Dempsey	
1990	My Blue Heaven	Linda	
1992	Passed Away	Denise Scanlan	
1995	Reckless	Trish	
1997	In & Out	Ava Blazer	
1998	You've Got Mail	Veronica Grant	
1999	Three to Tango	Lenore	
2002	The Good Girl	Gwen Jackson	
2003	American Wedding	Mary Flaherty	
2005	Strangers with Candy	Sara Blank	
2006	Half Nelson	Jo Dunne	
2007	The Good Life	Diane	
2007	The Visitor	Upper Eastside Woman	
2008	Fling	Katherine	
2009	Julie & Julia	Avis DeVoto	
2009	The Box	Clymene Steward	
2012	Rhymes with Banana	Jane	
2015	Ava's Possessions	Joanna	
2016	Women Who Kill	Grace	
2018	Accommodations	Victoria Maason	
2020	Before/During/After	Therapist #4	
2024	The Next Big One: A Comedy with Three Potential Problems	Aunt Mitty	Post-production

=== Television ===
Year	Title	Role	Notes
1981	Kiss Me, Petruchio	Bianca	TV film
1982	Alice at the Palace	Alice's Mother	TV film
1982	A Midsummer Night's Dream	Hermia	TV film
1985	Spenser: For Hire	Angela	Episode: "No Room at the Inn"
1987	Crime Story	Penelope Worth	Episode: "The Pinnacle"
1987	Leg Work	Judy	Episode: "Things That Go Bump in the Night"
1987	Invisible Thread	Dr. Norris	TV film
1988	The Dictator	Isabel Domino	Episode: "1.1"
1990	Against the Law	Louise Ciardi	Episode: "Pilot"
1992	Unnatural Pursuits	Stephanie Didcot	Episode: "I Don't Do Cuddles"
1994	Heaven & Hell: North & South, Book III	Isabel Hazard	TV miniseries
1995	The Client	Phoebe Halliwell	Episode: "Pilot"
1996-1997	Spin City	Helen Winston	Recurring role (4 episodes)
1997	Law & Order	Frances Houston	Episode: "Blood"
1999	Earthly Possessions	Heidi Anderson	TV film
1999-2000	Strangers with Candy	Sara Blank	Main role (30 episodes)
2000	Law & Order: Special Victims Unit	Christina Harlin	Episode: "Russian Love Poem"
2000	Madigan Men	Mrs. Wolfe	Episode: "Meet the Wolves"
2004	The Jury	Ms. Davenport	Episode: "The Honeymoon Suite"
2004	Tempting Adam	Ruth Heller	TV film
2010	The Electric Company	Caroline Heffenbacher	Episode: "Revolutionary Doughnuts"
2010	Big Lake	Linda Franklin	(10 episodes)
2012	The Good Wife	Judge Sally Rigby	Episode: "Gloves Come Off"
2013	Girls	Thomas-John's Mother	Episode: "It's a Shame About Ray"
2013-2019	Orange Is the New Black	Carol Chapman	(11 episodes)
2014	Inside Amy Schumer	Amy's mother	Episode: "Slow Your Roll"
2019	The Blacklist	Realtor	Episode: "Orion Relocation Services"
2021	Search Party	Gertrude Wreck	Episode: “The Thoughtless Woman”

== Theater ==
Year	Title	Role	Notes
1975-1976	Dance with Me	Goldie Pot	
1983-1985	Noises Off	Brooke Ashton	
1985-1986	Hay Fever	Jackie Coryton	
1993-1994	The Sisters Rosensweig	Gorgeous Teitelbaum	Replacement
2005	Absurd Person Singular	Marion	
2009	Blithe Spirit	Mrs. Bradman	
