= Greg Hollimon =

American actor (born 1956)

- Born: May 2, 1956 (age 70); Chicago, Illinois, United States
- Occupation: Actor
- Years active: 1993–present

Greg Hollimon (born May 2, 1956) is an American actor best known for his work on Comedy Central's Strangers with Candy. He is also known for featuring in Trapped in the Closet, the musical soap opera series by R. Kelly.

== Biography ==
Hollimon grew up in the Chicago housing projects of Cabrini–Green. In 1986, he began taking improvisation classes at The Players Workshop, where he met Paul Dinello and, some time later, Amy Sedaris. Hollimon then began doing stand-up at a few local comedy clubs and dabbled in comedy writing, while honing his craft of improvisation at Players Workshop.

Hollimon graduated from The Players Workshop in 1988 and enrolled in classes at Chicago's famed The Second City. While still taking classes, he was hired into Second City's National Touring Company, where he met Stephen Colbert. A year later, Sedaris, Dinello, Colbert, and Hollimon were all touring together, performing nightly improvisational theatre at colleges and universities across the country.

After leaving Second City in 1993, he wrote and performed in a two-man play called The RIC Show-Revelations, Indictments and Confessions with his friend and fellow actor Michael McCarthy.

When the play closed, Hollimon returned to Chicago to work in the theater. He appeared in notable productions including Eugene Lee’s East Texas Hot Links and Pearl Cleage’s Flyin' West, both of which drew critical praise.

Sedaris, Dinello, and Colbert created the role of Principal Blackman with Hollimon in mind for the Strangers with Candy TV series.
