= Strangers with Candy (film) =

- Theatrical release poster.
- Directed by: Paul Dinello
- Written by: Stephen Colbert; Paul Dinello; Amy Sedaris
- Based on: Strangers with Candy by Stephen Colbert; Paul Dinello; Amy Sedaris; Mitch Rouse
- Produced by: Lorena David; Valerie Schaer Nathanson; Mark Roberts
- Starring: Amy Sedaris; Stephen Colbert; Paul Dinello; Dan Hedaya; Joseph Cross; Deborah Rush; Maria Thayer; Carlo Alban; Ian Holm
- Cinematography: Oliver Bokelberg
- Edited by: Michael R. Miller
- Music by: Marcelo Zarvos
- Production companies: Comedy Central Films; Worldwide Pants; Roberts/David Films
- Distributed by: THINKFilm; Shout! Studios (Note: Restored version only.)
- Release dates: January 2005 (Sundance); June 28, 2006 (United States)
- Running time: 97 minutes
- Country: United States
- Language: English
- Box office: $2.3 million

Strangers with Candy is a 2005 American comedy film directed by Paul Dinello, written by Dinello, Stephen Colbert and Amy Sedaris, and serves as a prequel to their 1999–2000 Comedy Central television series of the same name. Set in the fictional city of Flatpoint, Strangers with Candy tells the story of 46-year-old former high school dropout and self-described "junkie whore" Jerri Blank (Sedaris), who, after being released from prison, returns to her childhood home and discovers her father (Dan Hedaya) is in a "stress-induced coma". Taking the suggestion of the family doctor (Ian Holm) literally, Jerri decides to pick her life back up where she left it, and starts again as a freshman at Flatpoint High. The film also stars Colbert, Dinello, Deborah Rush, Gregory Hollimon, and Maria Thayer reprising their original roles, and Joseph Cross and Carlo Alban joining the cast. The film was produced by Roberts/David Films and David Letterman's Worldwide Pants, with Colbert serving as co-producer.

Warner Independent Productions initially acquired the North American distribution rights to Strangers with Candy following its premiere at the 2005 Sundance Film Festival on January 21, 2005, but release of the film was delayed due to legal clearance issues. The rights reverted to the producers and were bought by THINKFilm in early 2006. The film began a limited release in the United States on June 28, 2006, and went on general release on July 7, 2006. It received a mixed critical response. The film grossed $2.3 million.

== Plot ==
46-year-old former high school dropout and self-described "junkie whore" Jerri Blank is released from prison and returns to her childhood home. She discovers her mother has died, her father, Guy, has remarried to the hateful Sara Blank, and she has an arrogant half-brother Derrick. To make matters worse, her father is in a "stress-induced coma". Taking the suggestion of the family doctor literally, Jerri decides to pick her life back up where she left it, beginning her high school all over again as a freshman at Flatpoint High.

Jerri joins Chuck Noblet's science fair team, the Fig Neutrons, along with her new friends, Megawatti Sucarnaputri (a spoof on Megawati Sukarnoputri) and Tammi Littlenut. Noblet is not pleased to learn that Principal Onyx Blackman has hired a ringer for their team, Roger Beekman, to ensure that Flatpoint wins, and so Noblet creates a second team. As she struggles to fit in and make her teammates proud, Jerri discovers that though the faces may have changed, the hassles of high school are just the same.

== Cast ==
- Amy Sedaris as Geraldine Antonia "Jerri" Blank
- Stephen Colbert as Chuck Noblet
- Paul Dinello as Geoffrey Jellineck
- Dan Hedaya as Guy Blank
- Joseph Cross as Derrick Blank
- Deborah Rush as Sara Blank
- Maria Thayer as Tamela "Tammi" Littlenut
- Carlo Alban as Megawatti Sukarnoputri
- Gregory Hollimon as Principal Onyx Blackman
- Allison Janney as Alice
- Matthew Broderick as Roger Beekman
- Sarah Jessica Parker as Peggy Callas
- Philip Seymour Hoffman as Henry
- Justin Theroux as Carlo Honklin
- Chris Pratt as Brason
- Delores Duffy as Iris Puffybush
- Kristen Johnston as Coach Divers
- David Pasquesi as Stew
- Ian Holm as Dr. Putney
- David Rakoff as Boswell
- Elisabeth Harnois as Monica
- Alexis Dziena as Melissa
- Thomas Guiry as P John
- Evelyn McGee as Clair Noblet
- Jonah Bobo (uncredited) as Seamus Noblet
- Ryan Donowho (uncredited) as Stanley
- Christopher Larkin (uncredited) as Kim
- Todd Oldham (uncredited) as Mr. Oldham

== Production ==
=== Development ===
Sedaris admitted in an interview that they never intended on making a film after the series was cancelled, explaining, "Paul, Steve, and I were working on our book Wigfield ... We kept coming up with funny Jerri Blank stuff to say, so it would go into a file, and by the end of the book, Paul opened the file and there was all this Blank stuff, and he said, 'Oh, it would be so funny to write a movie.' That's really how it happened". They were offered to write a script with the money already in place, but by the time Dinello finished writing it the investor had dropped out of the project. In 2004, after reading the script, David Letterman's Worldwide Pants stepped in as producers and funded the film, with Letterman citing Sedaris' involvement as one of the reasons: "Amy Sedaris is one of a handful of folks who actually make me laugh, I have no doubt her film will be as appealingly peculiar and funny as she is". The producers gave Dinello total creative control. By November, 2004 the film was in post-production.

=== Casting ===
- Orlando Pabotoy looked too old to reprise his series role as Orlando Pinatubo. His character was then replaced by the similar Megawatti Sukarnoputri.
- Larc Spies did not return for the role of Derrick because, according to Sedaris, "he looks like a longshoreman now." Several other characters were recast because the original actors looked too old to believably play high schoolers. The only original student to return was Thayer as redhead Tammi Littlenut.
- Roberto Gari did not reprise the role of Guy, who was instead portrayed by Hedaya, who portrayed Guy's character differently than Gari; on the television show, a 'healthy' Guy is frozen in humorous, almost statuesque states, whereas in the film, Hedaya's Guy is simply unconscious.

== Release ==
The film had its premiere on January 21, 2005, at the Sundance Film Festival. Shortly after the premiere at the festival, Warner Independent Pictures acquired North American distribution rights for $3 million. The deal was negotiated by Andrew Kramer and Cinetic Media. Newmarket Films also bid for the film. The film was set to release on September 23 but was later changed to October 21, 2005, nevertheless, it was shelved by Warner a week before, citing the producers' failure to fill copyright paperwork on time. Another source thought the heads of Warner Bros.' dislike of the film's crass humor was the actual reason.

In February 2006, THINKFilm bought the worldwide distribution rights from the producers for $2 million, a deal negotiated by Randy Manys and CAA. On June 1, 2006, the film opened New York's NewFest. It also opened CineVegas on June 9, 2006. The film had a limited theatrical release on June 28, 2006, before going wide in mid-July. The film had its Canadian premiere at Montreal's Just for Laughs festival on July 2006.

For the film's 20th anniversary, the IFC Center held two screenings on March 27, 2025 with a newly restored copy of the film, followed by a Q&A featuring Colbert, Dinello, Sedaris and moderated by Cole Escola. That same month it was announced that Shout! Studios had acquired all North American rights of the film, releasing it on digital media starting April 1 of the said year. Shout! also plans to release a collector's edition Blu-ray at the end of the year.

=== Marketing ===
THINKFilm's Mark Urman said the film "never did more than 100-and-something prints to make more than $2 million".

=== Home media ===
Strangers with Candy was released on DVD after its theatrical run, and on Blu-ray by Shout! Factory on July 22, 2025 for its 20th anniversary.

== Reception ==
=== Box office ===
The film opened in two venues on June 28, 2006, earning $43,141 in its debut and ranking #42 in the North American box office and fifth among the week's new releases. Its widest number of theaters being 109, the film ended its run on September 21, 2006, having grossed $2,072,645 domestically and $181,479 overseas for a worldwide total of $2,254,124.

=== Critical reception ===
Strangers with Candy holds a 51% approval rating on Rotten Tomatoes based on 103 reviews, with an average rating of 5.90/10. The site's consensus states: "Occasionally funny, but little more than a jumbled, overextended episode of the TV show. Still, Candy devotees won't be disappointed." Metacritic reports a 57 out of 100 rating based on 28 critics, indicating "mixed or average reviews".
