= Strangers with Candy =

American comedy television series

- Genre: Satire; Black comedy; Surreal comedy
- Created by: Stephen Colbert; Paul Dinello; Amy Sedaris; Mitch Rouse
- Starring: Amy Sedaris; Stephen Colbert; Paul Dinello; Greg Hollimon
- Country of origin: United States
- Original language: English
- No. of seasons: 3
- No. of episodes: 30 (List of episodes)

Production
- Running time: 23 minutes
- Production company: Comedy Partners

Original release
- Network: Comedy Central
- Release: April 7, 1999 – October 2, 2000

Strangers with Candy is an American television sitcom created by Stephen Colbert, Paul Dinello, Amy Sedaris, and Mitch Rouse that originally aired on Comedy Central from April 7, 1999, to October 2, 2000. Its timeslot was Sundays at 10:00 p.m. (ET). The series, inspired by after school specials, follows Jerri Blank (Sedaris) a 46-year-old woman who, after living as a prostitute and drug addict, decides to go back to high school and start doing things the right way. The series was produced by Comedy Partners, with Kent Alterman serving as executive producer and Colbert as co-producer.

Strangers with Candy episodes were produced in a single-camera setup and were filmed between upstate New York and New Jersey. The pilot episode premiered on April 7, 1999, and three seasons followed. The series stars Sedaris, Colbert, Dinello and Greg Hollimon with a supporting cast that includes Roberto Gari, Deborah Rush, Larc Spies, Maria Thayer, Orlando Patoboy, Sarah Thyre and David Pasquesi.

Tonally, Strangers with Candy uses surreal humor to satirize after school specials and the sanitized, saccharine advice those shows would give to kids. The show altered the lessons so the principal character would always do the wrong thing. It was Comedy Central's first ever live-action narrative series. The show struggled with low ratings during its initial broadcast run. Despite the lack of audience, it is now known as a cult classic, having influenced numerous contemporary comedians and screenwriters. A prequel film of the same name was released in 2005.

== Plot ==
Set in the fictional city of Flatpoint, Strangers with Candy follows Geraldine Antonia "Jerri" Blank, a former prostitute and drug addict—referred to in the show as a "junkie whore"—who returns to high school as a 46-year-old freshman at Flatpoint High. Jerri ran away from home and became "a boozer, a user, and a loser" after dropping out of high school as a teenager, supporting her drug habits through prostitution, stripping, and larceny. She has been to prison several times, the last time because she "stole the TV".

Jerri tries to do things the right way but always ends up learning the wrong lesson. Her hijinks often involve, either directly or indirectly, history teacher Chuck Noblet and his secret lover art teacher Geoffrey Jellineck. Every episode features a warped theme or moral lesson and ends with the cast and other featured actors from the episode dancing. The last episode features Flatpoint High being turned into a strip mall, a development that reflected Comedy Central cancelling the show to make room for a TV show called Strip Mall.

== Development ==
=== Conception ===
“I always refer to Paul and Stephen as the woodchoppers. And I'm more like a tree decorator. That's the way it is—they organize my chaos.”

— Amy Sedaris on Colbert and Dinello's involvement.

Sedaris, Dinello, Colbert and Rouse first created the sketch comedy show Exit 57, which debuted on Comedy Central in 1995 and aired through 1996. Although it lasted only 12 episodes, the show received favorable reviews and was nominated for five CableACE Awards in 1995, in categories including best writing, performance, and comedy series. After the show was cancelled, Colbert and Dinello were preparing a pitch for a show known as "Mysteries of the Insane Unknown" and had also applied to write for the Late Show with David Letterman. Simultaneously, Rouse and Sedaris had developed their own pitch, which Sedaris described as "something based on after-school specials" inspired by shows like The Brady Bunch. They presented it first to MTV, as Rouse knew someone there; while his friend loved it, they were told the channel would not go for it. Comedy Central was prepared to greenlight "Mysteries" but Dinello convinced Colbert to go help Sedaris with her pitch. Colbert was reticent after hearing her idea because he knew it was better than theirs; he was right, and Comedy Central's Kent Alterman chose her show instead.

At first, Sedaris wanted to do a straight after-school special: "We wanted to play it dead, dead serious. No laugh track, nothing. But Comedy Central didn't go for it." Rouse, Colbert, and Dinello went to the Museum Of Television and found several after-school specials starring Scott Baio, which they used as reference. Dinello later found a tape of Florrie Fisher's The Trip Back at Kim's video in the East Village; Fisher, a motivational speaker, recalled her days as a New York prostitute and heroin addict to a group of high-school students. After watching it, Dinello thought Fisher reminded him of Sedaris and promptly suggested doing a character—inspired by Fisher—who would go back to high school. Colbert added the idea of her learning the wrong lesson after every episode, and Sedaris said "Okay, she'll be a junkie whore this time." Rouse noted Strangers with Candy was a combination of Fisher's tape, the Baio specials, Aileen Wuornos: The Selling of a Serial Killer, and Frederick Wiseman's Titicut Follies.

=== Writing and production ===
Colbert, Dinello and Sedaris wrote most of the episodes. The process started with an "overlying outline": knowing the start and the end of the episode, they would build the scenes in between and later would improvise together in a room. Whatever they laughed at went in the script. Colbert later said of this method: "Our rule was, if it makes us laugh, we put it in the script. There was not a single thing said by a character in that show that was right. Every choice was the wrong moral choice. Because of the freedom Comedy Central allowed us, we said and did things that were outrageous and extreme." They would also keep typos in. Sedaris recalled: "That's what I learned from working on Strangers. If you're not laughing, how do you expect anyone else to laugh?" Alterman said of the show's structure "The way we approached [it] was to present each one as a morality play where in the third act the protagonist, Jerri Blank, would always, without fail, make the wrong choice. And then to cap it off, she would come back in the epilogue in the fourth act to say what she learned, and she would also draw the wrong lesson from the wrong choice she had made." To absolve themselves of the offensive stuff they had written, they would imagine all the scripts were written by a middle-aged woman named Jocelyn Hershey Guest, in a similar way to J.D. Salinger alter ego Buddy Glass. "In the world where she's writing, these are the right moral choices," Colbert has said. Very occasionally they would write with a collaborator such as Cindy Caponera, Mitch Rouse, or Thomas Lennon. Some of Jerri's phrases like "You got skills to pay the bills" and "I like the pole and the hole" came from things Sedaris' brother Paul would say. Much of Jerri's past is taken from anecdotes in The Trip Back, some of which are also in Fisher's autobiography, The Lonely Trip Back. Several lines of dialogue in the series were taken verbatim from Fisher's public-service film. Sedaris would often watch the show without sound to see if a deaf person could follow: "Okay, if I couldn't hear or understand anything, could I still find the show entertaining?" And I did. 'Cause everyone was so interesting to look at." The third season was written in Charleston, South Carolina, Colbert's hometown.

Comedy Central picked up the series in 1998 after Colbert had already begun working on The Daily Show. As a result, he accepted a reduced role, filming only around 20 Daily Show segments a year while he worked on the new series. The show was originally entitled The Way After School Special, but later was changed to Strangers With Candy, which was just a name they had come up with years earlier, and had been wanting to use for one of their projects. It came from the phrase "Don't take candy from strangers," which would probably be a lesson from an "Afterschool Special". Sedaris has credited producer Kent Alterman with the development of the show: "He really helped us shape that show. We went in there with strong ideas, but he changed it a lot from the pilot to the first episode. He had a good eye and really good ideas, and we trusted him from the get-go." Doug Herzog, who was at the time, president of Comedy Central's parent company Viacom, also noted his influence, "Kent recognized the brilliance and genius of Strangers With Candy really early on. He really championed it when a lot of us were looking at it, going, “What is this?” The show faced slight censorship from the network, Sedaris said, "It was weird. Like they let you say "pussy," but not "faggot" — until the fourth show. They said, "You have to build up to 'faggot.'" And the script of one show had me writing in my "dirty, filthy Jew diary." Well, I could say "dirty," but I couldn't say "filthy." It was killing me." Mostly, however, the writers were left alone to their own devices.

Vicki Farrell designed the wardrobe for the show. When designing Jerri Blank's appearance, Sedaris told Farrell "I want to look like I own a snake." Jerri would often wear high-waisted pants and snakeskin ankle boots, as well as turtlenecks because Comedy Central did not want track marks or tattoos to be visible. To complete the look Sedaris wore a fatsuit. Some of her clothes were custom made or came from thrift stores. Sedaris wore a wig and fake lashes, and told the hair and makeup department she wanted Jerri to look like a professional golfer. It would take about 40 minutes for Sedaris to get into character.

=== Casting ===
When writing the pilot, the writers would perform the characters, and realized that they were imitating Greg Hollimon when they read Principal Blackman's lines. Colbert called Hollimon to play the part, but his mother, who had dementia, forgot to pass him the message. A few weeks later Rose Abdoo was able to contact him, and he flew to New York to film. The creators, Hollimon, and many other stars of the series, were also alumni of Chicago's Second City. Roberto Gari was chosen for the role of Jerri's father Guy as he was the only actor who was able to do the character's poses and keep still for a long period of time.

=== Filming ===
The show was filmed between Westchester County, New York and New Jersey, with two different abandoned schools in the Rutherford area being used as the set for Flatpoint High.

== Cast and characters ==
=== Main characters ===
- Amy Sedaris as Geraldine "Jerri" Antonia Blank, a 46-year-old ex-con, ex-junkie, ex-prostitute, and high-school freshman at Flatpoint High.
- Stephen Colbert as Charles "Chuck" Noblet, the school's history teacher and sponsor of the school newspaper, The Donkey Trouser. He and his wife Claire have a son, Seamus, and he is in a secret sexual relationship with Geoffrey Jellineck.
- Paul Dinello as Geoffrey Jellineck, the school's art teacher. He is an emotionally fragile and narcissistic man who is engaged in a secret homosexual relationship with Chuck Noblet.
- Greg Hollimon as Principal Onyx Blackman, Principal of Flatpoint High School. His image is prominently displayed around the school, in classrooms, lockers, and even paper towels.
- Roberto Gari as Guy Blank (season 1; guest season 2), Jerri's biological father, shown only in a motionless state during mid-action. In the film, he is replaced by Dan Hedaya.
- Deborah Rush as Sara Blank (season 1; recurring seasons 2–3), Jerri's hateful stepmother.
- Larc Spies as Derrick Blank (season 1; recurring seasons 2–3), Jerri's arrogant teenage half-brother. He plays quarterback for the Flatpoint Donkeys football team. In the film, he is replaced by Joseph Cross.

=== Recurring characters ===
- Sarah Thyre as Coach Cherri Wolf, the girls' gym teacher. Thyre played Jerri's stepmom in the original pilot.
- Orlando Pabotoy as Orlando Pinatubo, Jerri's Filipino sidekick, about whose heritage she makes many racist remarks. In the film, he is replaced by Carlo Alban as Megawatti Sukarnoputri.
- Maria Thayer as Tammi Littlenut, Jerri's red-headed friend, who is often referred to as "Coppertop".
- David Pasquesi as Stew, the Blank family's meat man. He engages in an affair with Sara while remaining married to the mother of his two children (Chuck and Patty).
- Dolores Duffy as Iris Puffybush (seasons 2–3), secretary to Principal Blackman (and, as implied on several occasions, "much, much more").

== Episodes ==
Season	Episodes	Originally aired		
Season	Episodes	First aired	Last aired	Time slot
Pilot episode		Unaired		
1	10	April 7, 1999	July 19, 1999	Wednesdays, 10:30 pm (April); Mondays, 10:00 pm (June)
2	10	January 17, 2000	July 3, 2000	Wednesdays, 10:30 pm (April); Mondays, 10:00 pm (June)
3	10	July 10, 2000	October 2, 2000	Wednesdays, 10:30 pm (April); Mondays, 10:00 pm (June)
Film		June 28, 2006		

== Cancellation ==
The show was cancelled to give space for a new show called Strip Mall. In 2016, Sedaris said, "We never knew we had an audience. We never knew what the ratings were—we still haven't been told we were canceled! But we were fine doing more or not doing more, either way."

== Reception ==
=== Critical response ===
In an early review, Joyce Millman of Salon, said: "Strangers With Candy" is one of the most inventively bizarre shows in a long time –right up there with HBO's recent trial run of the mock-rock duo sitcom "Tenacious D"–. It manages to sustain the "Afterschool Special" joke with its smudged, '70s neo-realistic look, generic pseudo-pop background music and Jerri's throwback wardrobe." Rolling Stone was also complimentary of the show, "Strangers With Candy is gleefully absurdist stuff that is clearly not factory-made to suit all tastes, but it's certainly a brave if willfully fucked-up piece of work. And, who knows, Comedy Central has done well for itself selling that previously forbidden flavor before." Pete Schulberg at The Oregonian, commented on the show's uncompromising humour, "In its own twisted and taboo-bashing way, the series proves to be as outrageous as anything you'll see on TV. The satire is heavy-duty, but more often than not, it works". The Washington Post's Richard Leiby commended Comedy Central for "giving these inventive comedians a showcase for their stoner humor".

The New York Post's Michelle Greppi, compared the show unfavourably to similar media, "Strangers With Candy" aspires to be the anti-after-school special. Instead, it's just a flat and unfunny rip-off of "South Park" refracted through a prison prism and executed in a style that makes cable access look Oscar-ready and all of the "Heathers" ready for sainthood". Ana Marie Cox of Feedmag, had similar thoughts, "So far, critics have mostly responded to the show's supposed "outrageousness," though anyone who still thinks drug references and abortion jokes are "outrageous" must have stopped watching TV when the real After School Specials went off the air." Further adding, "Yet for all the richness of its targets, the show is curiously flat -- a broad parody whose sharpest moments stem from social non-sequitors and squeamishly inappropriate one-liners, as when Jerri announces: "I have to leave class early -- I'm getting my uterus scraped." Perhaps flatness is to be expected, as the show's creators [...] are veterans of "alternative comedy," a genre whose distinguishing characteristic is that it is rarely, you know, funny." Caryn James of The New York Times said the show "is simply boring" and that it "doesn't fail on the grounds of bad taste, but of bad comedy".

In a review of the second season, Tom Conroy of US Weekly called the show, "A tart satiric confection with a hard center", and rated it three of four stars. The Badger Herald, praised it as: "One of the most intelligently written shows on TV today. [...] believe me, "Strangers with Candy" is a rose garden in the decomposing landscape of network programming." On another positive review, Kinney Littlefield of The Orange County Register said, "Like great chocolate, Strangers With Candy has proved to be an addictive substance over its past two seasons".

On the show's cancellation, ABC News, commented: "Comedy Central might be canceling the sage, delightfully back-ass-wards Strangers With Candy show. If your response is "What's Strangers With Candy?" consider yourself part of the problem rather than the solution." Similarly, Melanie McFarland of The Seattle Times, lamented its demise: "The show regularly took viewers outside their comfort zone, and ardent fans kept "Strangers" a secret, taking the show's existence for granted. After all, it had a faithful core viewership that seemed to grow as more turned their friends on to it. As you can tell, "Strangers With Candy" is probably one of the most deliciously non-P.C. shows out there and certainly deserves more attention on TV than it's getting."

In 2007, Strangers with Candy was ranked number 30 on TV Guide's Top Cult Shows Ever.

=== Legacy and influence ===
“It certainly influenced a generation of comics and comedy writers. There's an old thing that people say in rock 'n' roll: The Velvet Underground didn't sell a lot of records, but every record they sold went to someone who started a band. Their influence is enormous. I would say the same thing about Strangers With Candy.”

— Doug Herzog, former president of Comedy Central's parent company Viacom.

Although the series had low ratings during the show's original broadcast, it became a cult classic, serving as inspiration for other comedians and screenwriters. When talking about Would It Kill You to Laugh? John Early and Kate Berlant cited the show as an influence, with Early saying: "It pushes back against schmaltziness in general, I feel a real kinship with that. It's irreverent and it's handled so well that it feels very personal." Lena Dunham also talked about it as an inspiration for Girls and cited Jerri Blank as one of her favorite television characters. Cole Escola, who was Sedaris's co-star on At Home with Amy Sedaris, also praised Strangers with Candy and recalled watching it as a teen with their high school boyfriend. Ilana Glazer claimed "Jerri Blank is at least 15 percent of my facial expressions, so I thank her for part of my face." Julie Klausner, who worked as an intern on the show while in college, said of it: "I can't really overestimate how influential that show was to me, [...] It's not for everyone, but the people it is for love it so passionately that when fans meet each other, it's almost like finding some sort of kinship." Rapper Amanda Blank based her stage name on Sedaris's character. Colbert has claimed that Blank served as a basis for his character on The Colbert Report. The New York Times, noted the show was part of the "tonal DNA" of Adult Swim's The Heart She Holler. Other fans of the show include Dan Levy, RuPaul, Trixie and Katya, John Mulaney, Dave Atell, Harvey Guillén, Brian Tyree Henry, Justin Theroux, Kevyn Aucoin, Sharon van Etten, Jack Antonoff, Danny DeVito, and Natalie Wynn.

In 2003, Dinello said of the show's cult status: "People were angered by it or fanatical about it. We were mocking the conventions of after-school specials and most of what you see on television--how easily things are sewn up, how false relationships are." In a panel with Levy, when asked about why they think the show had such a dedicated fanbase, Dinello and Sedaris said, "We embrace losers, misfits and outcasts." Sedaris has described the audience for the show as "Drag Queens getting ready on a Friday at 5:30." as well as "Homosexuals and 14-year-olds and farmers and ghosts." She has also said, "I'm just glad it still lives on. It's fun to know that you threw a hole on the wall, you went through it, you did this show that you didn't know what it was, and now there's a whole new generation of kids watching it. It's still out there and still alive, and we're all really proud of it. Colbert echoed the statement: "It's a badge of honor that I served Amy's comedic vision. I could do hack shit for the rest of my life, but I'd go, "Yeah, but I also wrote that stuff." In 2024 he described the show's fan base as "deeply troubled," continuing, "And I'm happy for them, because I'm deeply troubled too."

== Film adaptation and future ==
On February 7, 2006, film company ThinkFilm announced that it had acquired the distribution rights to a feature film based on the series. The film, a prequel to the television show, was completed in 2004 and acquired by Warner Independent at Sundance in 2005, but release of the film was delayed due to legal clearance issues. Amy Sedaris, Stephen Colbert, and Paul Dinello reprised their roles for the film; several other characters were recast because the actors who played them now looked too old to be in high school. In addition to acting, Colbert is a co-producer and Dinello is a director for the film. Worldwide Pants, a production company owned by comedian David Letterman, was also a producer. This is the company's first feature film production. A teaser trailer for the film was released in April 2006.

The initial theatrical release was June 28, 2006, in the New York City area, followed by the remainder of the United States on July 7. A DVD of the film was released in November 2006. Amy Sedaris said of Jerri Blank that "she's like a rash; you never know when she's going to pop up."

In 2024, it was revealed that the creators had been approached about a revival of the series, which they have declined as "Nothing has felt right so far". Regardless, they have not brushed off the possibility of it coming back in some way. Dinello noted: "Everybody seems game to do something. But we need an adult to make it happen". Although Sedaris has brought up concerns about the difficulty to make the show now, due to its un-PC humor, Colbert has disagreed, "You can make anything you want, you just have to deal with people being upset".
