= List of British films of 1973 =

British films released in 1973

This is a list of films produced in the United Kingdom in 1973 (see 1973 in film):

== 1973 ==
Title	Director	Cast	Genre	Notes
1973
The 14	David Hemmings	Jack Wild, June Brown, Liz Edmiston	Drama	Won the Silver Bear at Berlin
Adolf Hitler: My Part in His Downfall	Norman Cohen	Jim Dale, Arthur Lowe, Spike Milligan	Comedy	
And Now the Screaming Starts!	Roy Ward Baker	Peter Cushing, Herbert Lom, Stephanie Beacham	Horror	
Assassin	Peter Crane	Ian Hendry, Edward Judd, Ray Brooks	Thriller	
Baxter!	Lionel Jeffries	Patricia Neal, Britt Ekland, Scott Jacoby	Drama	
The Belstone Fox	James Hill	Eric Porter, Jeremy Kemp, Bill Travers	Drama	
Bequest to the Nation	James Cellan Jones	Glenda Jackson, Peter Finch, Margaret Leighton	Historical	
The Best Pair of Legs in the Business	Christopher Hodson	Reg Varney, Diana Coupland, Lee Montague	Comedy drama	
Big Zapper	Lindsay Shonteff	Linda Marlowe, Jack May, Penny Irving	Action	
The Blockhouse	Clive Rees	Peter Sellers, Charles Aznavour, Jeremy Kemp	War drama	Entered into the 23rd Berlin International Film Festival
Blue Blood	Andrew Sinclair	Oliver Reed, Fiona Lewis, Derek Jacobi	Horror	
Carry On Girls	Gerald Thomas	Sid James, Barbara Windsor, June Whitfield	Comedy	
Charley One-Eye	Don Chaffey	Richard Roundtree, Nigel Davenport, Roy Thinnes	Western	Co-production with the United States
Commuter Husbands	Derek Ford	Gabrielle Drake, Robin Bailey, Heather Chasen	Sex comedy	
The Creeping Flesh	Freddie Francis	Christopher Lee, Peter Cushing, Jenny Runacre	Horror	
The Day of the Jackal	Fred Zinneman	Edward Fox, Michael Lonsdale, Delphine Seyrig	Thriller	Co-production with France; Number 74 in the list of BFI Top 100 British films
A Delicate Balance	Tony Richardson	Katharine Hepburn, Paul Scofield, Lee Remick	Drama	Co-production with the United States
Digby, the Biggest Dog in the World	Joseph McGrath	Jim Dale, Angela Douglas, Spike Milligan	Family	Co-production with France
A Doll's House	Patrick Garland	Claire Bloom, Anthony Hopkins, Ralph Richardson	Drama	
A Doll's House	Joseph Losey	Jane Fonda, Edward Fox, David Warner	Drama	Co-production with France
Don't Look Now	Nicolas Roeg	Julie Christie, Donald Sutherland, Massimo Serato	Horror thriller	Number 8 in the list of BFI Top 100 British films
England Made Me	Peter Duffell	Peter Finch, Michael York, Hildegarde Neil	Drama	Co-production with Yugoslavia
Father, Dear Father	William G. Stewart	Patrick Cargill, Natasha Pyne, Donald Sinden	Comedy	Adapted from the TV series of the same title
The Final Programme	Robert Fuest	Jon Finch, Jenny Runacre, Hugh Griffith	Sci-fi thriller	
Gawain and the Green Knight	Stephen Weeks	Murray Head, Ciaran Madden, Nigel Green	Adventure	
Ghost in the Noonday Sun	Peter Medak	Peter Sellers, Anthony Franciosa, Spike Milligan	Comedy	
The Golden Voyage of Sinbad	Gordon Hessler	John Phillip Law, Caroline Munro, Tom Baker	Fantasy	Co-production with the United States
The Hireling	Alan Bridges	Robert Shaw, Sarah Miles, Peter Egan	Drama	Won the Grand Prix at the 1973 Cannes Film Festival
Hitler: The Last Ten Days	Ennio De Concini	Alec Guinness, Simon Ward, Diane Cilento	War drama	Co-production with Italy
Holiday on the Buses	Bryan Izzard	Reg Varney, Bob Grant, Stephen Lewis	Comedy	TV sitcom spin-off sequel from On the Buses
The Homecoming	Peter Hall	Cyril Cusack, Ian Holm, Paul Rogers	Drama	
Horror Hospital	Antony Balch	Michael Gough, Robin Askwith, Dennis Price	Comedy horror	
The House in Nightmare Park	Peter Sykes	Frankie Howerd, Ray Milland, Hugh Burden	Comedy horror	
The Legend of Hell House	John Hough	Pamela Franklin, Roddy McDowall, Gayle Hunnicutt	Horror	
Live and Let Die	Guy Hamilton	Roger Moore, Jane Seymour, Yaphet Kotto	Spy	First performance of Roger Moore as James Bond
The Love Ban	Ralph Thomas	Hywel Bennett, Nanette Newman, Angharad Rees	Comedy	
Love Thy Neighbour	John Robins	Jack Smethurst, Rudolph Walker, Nina Baden-Semper	Comedy	Spin-off from TV series Love Thy Neighbour
The Lovers!	Herbert Wise	Richard Beckinsale, Paula Wilcox, Susan Littler	Comedy	Spin-off from TV series The Lovers
The Mackintosh Man	John Huston	Paul Newman, Dominique Sanda, James Mason	Spy thriller	
Man at the Top	Mike Vardy	Kenneth Haigh, Nanette Newman, Harry Andrews	Drama	Spin-off from TV series Man at the Top
Medusa	Gordon Hessler	George Hamilton, Luciana Paluzzi, Cameron Mitchell	Crime	Co-production with Greece
Mistress Pamela	Jim O'Connolly	Ann Michelle, Dudley Foster, Anna Quayle	Historical comedy	
The National Health	Jack Gold	Lynn Redgrave, Colin Blakely, Eleanor Bron	Black comedy	
Nearest and Dearest	John Robins	Hylda Baker, Jimmy Jewel, Joe Gladwin	Comedy	Spin-off from TV series Nearest and Dearest
Never Mind the Quality Feel the Width	Ronnie Baxter	John Bluthal, Joe Lynch, Yootha Joyce	Comedy	Spin-off from TV series Never Mind the Quality, Feel the Width
Night Watch	Brian G. Hutton	Elizabeth Taylor, Laurence Harvey, Billie Whitelaw	Thriller	Co-production with the United States
No Sex Please, We're British	Cliff Owen	Ronnie Corbett, Arthur Lowe, Susan Penhaligon	Comedy	
Not Now, Darling	Ray Cooney, David Croft	Leslie Phillips, Julie Ege, Joan Sims	Comedy	
Nothing But The Night	Peter Sasdy	Christopher Lee, Peter Cushing, Diana Dors	Horror thriller	
O Lucky Man!	Lindsay Anderson	Malcolm McDowell, Ralph Richardson, Helen Mirren	Comedy drama	
The Offence	Sidney Lumet	Sean Connery, Trevor Howard, Ian Bannen	Crime drama	
The Optimists of Nine Elms	Anthony Simmons	Peter Sellers, John Chaffey, Patricia Brake	Drama	
Penny Gold	Jack Cardiff	James Booth, Francesca Annis, Nicky Henson	Thriller	
Psychomania	Don Sharp	Nicky Henson, Lee Ann Michelle, Roy Holder	Horror	
Scream... and Die!	José Ramón Larraz	Andrea Allan, Judy Matheson, Edmund Pegge	Horror	Co-production with Spain
Secrets of a Door-to-Door Salesman	Wolf Rilla	Brendan Price, Sue Longhurst, Graham Stark	Sex comedy	
Steptoe and Son Ride Again	Peter Sykes	Wilfrid Brambell, Harry H. Corbett, Diana Dors	Comedy	TV sitcom spin-off sequel from Steptoe and Son
Take Me High	David Askey	Cliff Richard, Deborah Watling, Hugh Griffith	Musical	
Tales That Witness Madness	Freddie Francis	Jack Hawkins, Suzy Kendall, Kim Novak	Horror	
That'll Be The Day	Claude Whatham	David Essex, Ringo Starr, James Booth	Drama	
Theatre of Blood	Douglas Hickox	Vincent Price, Diana Rigg, Ian Hendry	Comedy horror	
The Three Musketeers	Richard Lester	Oliver Reed, Michael York, Raquel Welch	Adventure	
Tiffany Jones	Pete Walker	Anouska Hempel, Ray Brooks, Eric Pohlmann	Sex comedy	
A Touch of Class	Melvin Frank	George Segal, Glenda Jackson, Paul Sorvino	Comedy	
The Vault of Horror	Roy Ward Baker	Dawn Addams, Terry-Thomas, Denholm Elliott	Horror	
Voices	Kevin Billington	David Hemmings, Gayle Hunnicutt, Lynn Farleigh	Horror thriller	
White Cargo	Ray Selfe	David Jason, Hugh Lloyd, Imogen Hassall	Comedy	
The Wicker Man	Robin Hardy	Edward Woodward, Christopher Lee, Diane Cilento	Horror	Number 96 in the list of BFI Top 100 British films; remade in 2006

== Top films at the British box office in 1973 ==
1. Live and Let Die
2. The Godfather
3. A Clockwork Orange
4. Snow White and the Seven Dwarfs (1937)
5. The Poseidon Adventure
6. Last Tango in Paris
7. Cabaret
8. The Day of the Jackal
9. Lady Caroline Lamb
10. That'll Be the Day
11. Lady Sings the Blues
12. Lost Horizon
13. High Plains Drifter
14. Fear is the Key
15. Love Thy Neighbour
16. Alice's Adventures in Wonderland
17. Super Fly
18. King Boxer
19. Fuzz
20. The Great Waltz

== See also ==
- 1973 in British music
- 1973 in British radio
- 1973 in British television
- 1973 in the United Kingdom
