= Skarbek =

Coat of arms of Counts Skarbek

Skarbek (archaic feminine by marriage: Skarbkowa, archaic feminine by birth: Skarbkówna) is a Polish language surname, which originally meant a rich individual or miser, derived from the word skarb, meaning "treasure" or "wealth". The name may refer to:

- Skarbek family (Skarbkowie) a Polish noble family of Abdank coat of arms raised to the rank of untitled nobility in the 11th century; branches of the family were granted the title of count in Galicia in 1778 and in Austria and Russia in 1835.
- Alfred Skarbek Korzybski (1879–1950), Polish philosopher
- Andrew Skarbek (game show contestant) (born 1967 or 1968), Australian game show winner
- Andrzej Skarbek (1925–2011), Polish psychiatrist and psychotherapist
- Anna Skarbek (born 1976), Australian businesswoman
- Charlie Skarbek (born 1953), British musician
- Fryderyk Skarbek (1792–1866), Polish economist
- Honorata Skarbek (born 1992), Polish singer
- Krystyna Skarbek (1908–1952), Polish intelligence agent
- Maria Skarbkowa, name by the first marriage of Maria Wodzińska (1819–1896), Polish artist who was once engaged to composer Frédéric Chopin
- Marjorie Skarbek (born 1944), British writer
- Rafał Skarbek-Malczewski, Polish snowboarder
- Sacha Skarbek (born 1972), British musician
- Stefan Skarbek (born 1979), British musician
