= Kids' table (disambiguation) =

The kids' table may refer to:

- Kids' table, a table at a gathering set aside for children or junior members of an organization
- The Kid Table, a 2010 novel by Andrea Siegel
- Big D and the Kids Table, a ska punk band
