= Speechless (play) =

Play by Polly Teale and Linda Brogan

- Original language: English
- Written by: Linda Brogan and Polly Teale
- Based on: The Silent Twins by Marjorie Wallace

Premiere
- Date: 5 August 2010
- Place: Traverse Theatre, Edinburgh
- Original run: 5 August 2010 - 29 August 2010

Speechless is a 2011 play by British playwrights Linda Brogan and Polly Teale. It was based on The Silent Twins by Marjorie Wallace, telling the story of June and Jennifer Gibbons. Its premiere was a national tour of the UK from 20 September to 26 November 2011, in a Shared Experience-Sherman Cymru co-production – venues included the Arcola Theatre in London and the Edinburgh Festival.
