= Oliver Irving =

British film director

Oliver Irving is a British film director. He directed and wrote How To Be starring Robert Pattinson, and directed the comedy-thriller Ghost Team, which stars Jon Heder, David Krumholtz, Melonie Diaz, Paul W. Downs with Justin Long and Amy Sedaris. Based in New York he is currently in post production on his third feature film.
