= On Giant's Shoulders =

1979 television film

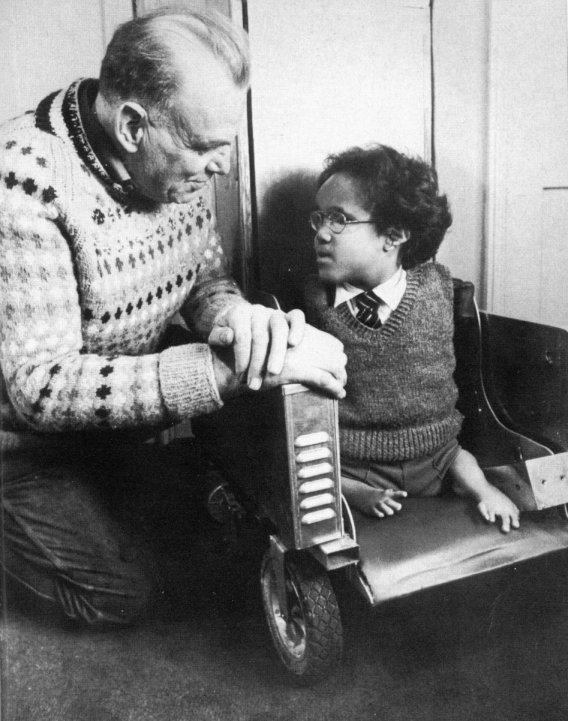
Terry Wiles (right) played himself in the film

On Giant's Shoulders is a 1979 BBC television film about the early life of thalidomide victim Terry Wiles, with Wiles playing himself. The drama also starred Bryan Pringle and Judi Dench and won an Emmy Award in 1980.

Based on a 1976 book of the same name by Marjorie Wallace and Michael Robson, the 90-minute film was first shown on BBC2 on 29 March 1979 as the 'Play of the Week', and was written by William Humble and Anthony Simmons; the latter was also the director. Terry Wiles had never acted before and, as he was then 17, his voice had to be dubbed by a child actor after filming as it had broken and he had to appear to be much younger, playing himself from age 9 to 12.

The drama tells the story of Terry Wiles, who was born with severe disabilities following his mother's use of the sedative thalidomide, prescribed at that time for morning sickness, during her pregnancy. Abandoned by his mother at birth, he is later adopted from a children's home by the middle-aged and childless couple Hazel (Judi Dench) and Len Wiles (Bryan Pringle). The couple quickly adjust to caring for so severely disabled a child, and Len Wiles develops a series of motorised wheelchairs (or 'Supercars') based on the forklift truck, so that Terry can live as independent a life as possible. Eventually, through the love and care of his adoptive parents Terry adjusts to life in the ordinary world and attends school with able-bodied pupils for the first time.

Judi Dench was nominated for a Best Actress BAFTA for her role as Hazel Wiles.

== Cast ==
- Terry Wiles – Himself
- Len Wiles – Bryan Pringle
- Hazel Wiles – Judi Dench
- Sister Page – Hilda Braid
- Mrs Proctor – Anna Wing
- Teacher at Hospital – Barbara Young
- Len Curry – Tim Wylton
- Café cashier – Barbara Keogh
- Solicitor – Frank Barrie
- Hospital Administrator – Tony Church
- Marjorie Wallace – Annabel Leventon
- Registrar – Elizabeth Morgan
- Limb Technician – Anthony Heaton
- Miss Hudson – Jean Rimmer
