= June and Jennifer Gibbons =

Welsh identical twins

June Gibbons
- Born: 11 April 1963 (age 63); British Forces Aden, Yemen
- Occupation: Fiction author
- Parent(s): Gloria and Aubrey Gibbons

Jennifer Gibbons
- Born: 11 April 1963; British Forces Aden, Yemen
- Died: 9 March 1993 (aged 29)
- Occupation: Fiction author
- Parent(s): Gloria and Aubrey Gibbons

June Gibbons (born 11 April 1963) and Jennifer Gibbons (11 April 1963 – 9 March 1993) were Welsh twin sisters. They became known as "The Silent Twins", since they only communicated with each other. They wrote works of fiction.

In 1981 the girls committed several crimes, including vandalism, petty theft, and arson, which led to them being admitted to Broadmoor Hospital. The twins were sentenced to indefinite detention under the Mental Health Act and were held for eleven years.

== Early life ==
June and Jennifer, born on April 1963, in British Forces Aden, Yemen, were the daughters of Caribbean immigrants Gloria and Aubrey Gibbons. The Gibbons family moved from Barbados to the United Kingdom in the early 1960s, as part of the Windrush generation. Gloria was a housewife and Aubrey worked as a technician for the Royal Air Force. The couple also had three other children: Greta was born in 1957, David was born in 1959, and Rosie was born in 1967.

In 1960, Aubrey went to stay with a relative in Coventry and soon qualified as a staff technician. Gloria followed, with Greta and David, several months later. The twins were born on 11 April 1963, at a military hospital in Aden, Yemen, where their father had been deployed. The family soon relocated, first to England, and, in 1974, to Haverfordwest, Wales. The twin sisters were inseparable and their language, a sped-up Bajan Creole, made it difficult for people to understand them. In 2023, June said, "We had a speech impediment. Our parents couldn't understand a word that we were saying, nobody understood - so we stopped talking."

The Gibbons were often ostracised at school, eventually causing the administrators to dismiss them early each day so that they might avoid bullying. Their language became even more idiosyncratic at this time. Soon it was unintelligible to others. The girls' idioglossia has frequently been characterised as an example of cryptophasia, or a language devised and shared only by a set of twins, but June Gibbons has disputed this, stating that this was simply the effect of their speech impediment. According to June, the twins had in fact been speaking English, which others had mistaken for an invented language due to the severity of their speech difficulties.

In 2023, she explained that even their own parents were unable to understand their speech, saying 'we had to point at things we wanted, when our mother asked us what we wanted for tea or whatever. She thought we were talking a different language.' This difficulty continued when the twins started to attend school in Yorkshire. According to June: 'they thought we were talking a different language. We could understand what we were saying, but I just don't think they knew what we were saying at all.' Speech therapy was recommended for the twins, but this was ultimately unsuccessful due to their continued unwillingness to speak out loud for fear of being misunderstood, as well as the family's frequent relocations due to their father's military occupation. The twins became increasingly reserved, and eventually spoke to no one except each other and their younger sister Rose.

The girls continued to attend school, although they refused to read or write. In 1974, a medic administering vaccinations at the school noted their impassive behaviour and notified a child psychologist. The twins began seeing a succession of therapists who tried unsuccessfully to get them to communicate with others. They were sent to separate boarding schools in an attempt to break their isolation, but the pair became catatonic and entirely withdrawn when parted.

== Creative expression ==
When they were reunited, the two spent several years isolating themselves in their bedroom, engaging in elaborate plays with dolls. They created many plays and stories in a sort of soap opera style, reading some of them aloud on tape as gifts for their sister Rose. Inspired by a pair of gift diaries on Christmas 1979, they began their writing careers. They sent away for a mail order course in creative writing, and each kept an extensive diary and wrote a number of stories, poems, and novels. Set primarily in the United States, and particularly in Malibu, California, the stories involve young men and women who exhibit strange and often criminal behaviour.

June wrote a novel titled The Pepsi-Cola Addict, in which the high-school hero is seduced by a teacher, then sent away to a reformatory where a homosexual guard makes a play for him. The two girls pooled their unemployment benefits in order to get the novel published by a vanity press. This was the only accessible work by either of the Gibbons sisters; it remained unavailable for purchase and was held in only 89 libraries in the world until October 2022, when it was republished in a limited edition by Cashen's Gap. It was also published as a paperback in May 2023 by Strange Attractor. Their other attempts to publish novels and stories were generally unsuccessful, although Cashen's Gap has planned further releases.

In Jennifer's The Pugilist, a physician is so eager to save his child's life that he kills the family dog to obtain its heart for a transplant. The dog's spirit lives on in the child and ultimately has its revenge against the father. Jennifer also wrote Discomania, the story of a young woman who discovers that the atmosphere of a local disco incites patrons to insane violence. Jennifer's Discomania was published posthumously in 2026 through Penguin Random House with a foreword by David Tibet of Current 93. She followed this up with The Taxi-Driver's Son, a radio play called Postman and Postwoman, and several short stories. June Gibbons is considered to be an outsider writer.

== Hospitalization ==
In their later teenage years, the twins began using drugs and alcohol. In 1981, the girls committed crimes including vandalism, petty theft and arson. While awaiting trial they were assessed by a psychiatrist and transferred to Broadmoor Hospital, a high-security mental health hospital. In 1982, the twins were sentenced to indefinite detention to Broadmoor under the Mental Health Act. They remained at Broadmoor for eleven years. June later blamed this lengthy sentence on their selective muteness: "Juvenile delinquents get two years in prison. [...] We got twelve years of hell, because we didn't speak. [...] We lost hope, really. I wrote a letter to the Home Office. I wrote a letter to the Queen, asking her to pardon us, to get us out, but we were trapped."

Placed on high doses of antipsychotic medications, they found themselves unable to concentrate. Jennifer apparently developed tardive dyskinesia (a neurological disorder resulting in involuntary, repetitive movements). Their medications were apparently adjusted sufficiently to allow them to continue the copious diaries they had begun in 1980, and they were able to join the hospital choir, but they lost most of their interest in creative writing.

The case gained attention due to newspaper coverage by journalist Marjorie Wallace of The Sunday Times. Wallace later wrote a book about the two titled The Silent Twins, published in 1986 by Prentice Hall.

== Jennifer's death ==
According to Wallace, the girls had a longstanding agreement that if one died, the other must begin to speak and live a normal life. During their stay in the hospital, they began to believe that it was necessary for one of them to die, and after much discussion, Jennifer agreed to make the sacrifice of her life.

In March 1993, the twins were transferred from Broadmoor to the more open Caswell Clinic in Bridgend, Wales. On arrival, Jennifer could not be roused. She was taken to the hospital, where she died soon after of acute myocarditis, a sudden inflammation of the heart. There was no evidence of drugs or poison in her system.

At the inquest, June revealed that Jennifer had been acting strangely for about a day before their release; her speech had been slurring, and she had said that she was dying. On the trip to Caswell, she had slept in June's lap with her eyes open. On a visit a few days later, Wallace recounted that June "was in a strange mood". She said, "I'm free at last, liberated, and at last Jennifer has given up her life for me." She also described it as a tsunami, washing her of her sins and being free of her sister. Jennifer was interred in St Martin's Cemetery, Haverfordwest, Pembrokeshire, Wales.

After Jennifer's death, June gave interviews with Harper's Bazaar and The Guardian. By 2008, she was living quietly and independently, near her parents in West Wales. She is no longer monitored by psychiatric services and sought to put the past behind her. A 2016 interview with her sister Greta revealed that the family had been deeply troubled by the girls' incarceration. She blamed Broadmoor for ruining their lives and for neglecting Jennifer's health. She had wanted to file a lawsuit against Broadmoor, but Aubrey and Gloria refused, saying it would not bring Jennifer back.

== In the media ==
The pair was the subject of the 1986 television drama The Silent Twins, broadcast on BBC2 as part of its Screen Two series, and an Inside Story documentary Silent Twin – Without My Shadow, which aired on BBC1 in September 1994. A play based on Wallace's book, titled Speechless, debuted in London in 2011.

The American poet Lucie Brock-Broido wrote a poem, "Elective Mutes", about the twins in her first book The Hunger, published by Alfred A. Knopf in 1988.

The twins' story also inspired the 1998 Manic Street Preachers song "Tsunami".

Polish filmmaker Agnieszka Smoczyńska directed the 2022 feature film The Silent Twins, with the twins as the subject, starring Letitia Wright and Tamara Lawrance, based on the 1986 book The Silent Twins by Marjorie Wallace. Smoczyńska's English-language debut, the film was an international co-production between the UK's 42 Management & Production and Poland's Mandats and backed by the Polish Film Institute and moderator Inwestycje.

Luke Haines' 2001 album The Oliver Twist Manifesto includes a song called Discomania. Haines later compared the "symbiotic" relation between Pete Doherty and Carl Barat (of The Libertines) to the one that the twins had.

Angeline Morrison's 2022 album The Sorrow Songs (Folk Songs of Black British Experience) features a song about the twins, "The Flames They Do Grow High".

The story of the twins was the subject of a 2023 BBC podcast June: Voice of a Silent Twin, which featured an extensive interview with June Gibbons, recounting the twins' childhood, events leading to their trial and imprisonment and their eventual release.

== See also ==
- Poto and Cabengo – Twins who used an invented language
- Ursula and Sabina Eriksson – Swedish twins involved in a shared psychotic episode
