= The Prince of Wales International Centre for SANE Research =

Mental health research institute

- Nickname: POWIC
- Founder: SANE
- Headquarters: Oxford
- Honorary science director: Tim Crow
- Website: Centre website

The Prince of Wales International Centre for SANE Research (POWIC) in Oxford houses investigations into finding the causes of and better treatment for serious mental illnesses, such as schizophrenia and depression.

== History and activities ==
In 2003, POWIC was built with donations from the Xylas shipping family, the late King of Saudi Arabia Fahd bin Abdel Aziz Al-Said, and the Sultan of Brunei. The building was formally opened by SANE's Patron, The Prince of Wales in February 2003, although the scientific programme had been running for the previous nine years. Support for POWIC was encouraged by SANE's founder and chief executive Marjorie Wallace (SANE) CBE.

Prior to the formation of SANE in 1986 there was a considerable paucity of research interest in schizophrenia and bipolar disorder. One of the charity's endeavors has been to initiate and fund research into the causes and treatments of mental illness.

In order to focus research efforts, SANE established POWIC in conjunction with the research psychiatrist Professor Tim Crow. Crow was appointed the honorary scientific director of SANE based at the Department of Psychiatry at Warneford Hospital, part of Oxford University. SANE raised £3.5 million to establish centre on the Warneford Hospital site. The specially designed and purpose built centre includes office and laboratory space, as well as conference and library facilities.

== Aims ==
The aims of POWIC are:

- to establish the causes of severe mental illnesses such as schizophrenia and depression
- to become a central point for discussion in this field
- to disseminate scientific information on mental illnesses.

== Research ==
Crow has been studying schizophrenia for over 20 years, and he and his research group have been developing and researching a specific hypothesis about the origins of psychosis - that it is associated with the unique human capacity for language. Crow arrived at this hypothesis by bringing together the fact that schizophrenia only appears to occur in humans and not in our closest relatives, chimpanzees. The same can be said of brain asymmetry (the left and right sides of the brain, which are basically the same, being different in size). Brain asymmetry has been linked to the capacity for language.

POWIC's quest for an organic basis for mental illness is pursued using three levels of explanation:

- genetics - looking at the genetic differences between humans and chimpanzees to find out about brain evolution, and genetic differences between individuals with schizophrenia and those without
- neuropathology - the physical differences between the brains of those with schizophrenia and those without, such as regional brain volumes and cell density
- neuroimaging and psychology - the relationship between brain structure on MRI scans and behaviour, in particular between brain asymmetry and language function.

The Dalai Lama, who visited Oxford in 2008, gave his support to the new Centre and the scientific examination of the Mindfulness approach: "My primary concern is not to propagate religion, but to benefit humanity. It is certainly right to use Buddhist techniques like mindfulness to alleviate suffering in this life."

== See also ==
- Mental health in the United Kingdom
