= Mirrorball Entertainment =

Los Angeles-based record label

Mirrorball Entertainment is a record label, publishing and production company based in Los Angeles. The company was co-founded in 2011 by industry veteran Tony Maserati and writer Stefan Skarbek.

== Background ==
Co-founded in 2011 by industry veteran Tony Maserati and writer Stefan Skarbek, Mirrorball Entertainment, LLC is a record label, publishing and production company based in Los Angeles and incorporated in California in 2012, Entity Number 201203810013.

Mirrorball Entertainment has signed musical acts to record deals, including Cody Longo as well as writers to publishing deals. The company has also created strategic partnerships with manufacturers, including iZotope. Mirrorball has also worked with artist Judith Hill.

In 2017, Mirrorball Entertainment has signed a deal with the Universal Music Publishing Group to manage the Mirrorball Publishing catalog, and they reportedly planned to partner with UMPG on future signings.
