= The Silent Twins (2022 film) =

- Theatrical release poster
- Directed by: Agnieszka Smoczyńska
- Screenplay by: Andrea Seigel
- Based on: The Silent Twins by Marjorie Wallace
- Produced by: Klaudia Śmieja-Rostworowska; Ewa Puszczyńska; Ben Pugh; Joshua Horsfield; Anita Gou; Alicia van Couvering; Letitia Wright
- Starring: Letitia Wright; Tamara Lawrance; Nadine Marshall; Treva Etienne; Michael Smiley; Jodhi May
- Cinematography: Jakub Kijowski
- Edited by: Agnieszka Glińska
- Production companies: Madants; Extreme Emotions; 42; 30West; Canal+; Kindred Spirit; Polish Film Institute; Cofiloisir
- Distributed by: Focus Features (United States); Universal Pictures (International); Gutek Film (Poland)
- Release dates: 24 May 2022 (Cannes); 16 September 2022 (United States); 9 December 2022 (United Kingdom)
- Running time: 113 minutes
- Countries: United Kingdom; Poland; United States
- Language: English
- Box office: $298,207

The Silent Twins is a 2022 internationally co-produced biographical drama film. The film is about twin sisters, June and Jennifer Gibbons, who were institutionalized at Broadmoor Hospital following years of silence and teenage rebellion. It was directed by Agnieszka Smoczyńska from a screenplay by Andrea Seigel, who adapted the book of the same name by Marjorie Wallace. The film stars Letitia Wright, Tamara Lawrance, Nadine Marshall, Treva Etienne, Michael Smiley, and Jodhi May.

The Silent Twins had its world premiere at the 2022 Cannes Film Festival, under the Un Certain Regard section, on May 24, 2022,. It was released in the United States on September 16, 2022, by Focus Features, and in the United Kingdom on December 9, 2022, by Universal Pictures.

== Plot ==
Feeling isolated from their unwelcoming community, June and Jennifer Gibbons turn inward and reject communication with everyone but each other, retreating into a fantasy world of artistic inspiration and adolescent desires. After a spree of vandalism inspired by an American teenager they both idolize, the girls are detained to Broadmoor Hospital, an infamous psychiatric hospital, where they face the choice to separate and survive or die together.

== Cast ==
- Letitia Wright as June Gibbons
  - Leah Mondesir-Simmonds as young June Gibbons
- Tamara Lawrance as Jennifer Gibbons
  - Eva-Arianna Baxter as young Jennifer Gibbons
- Nadine Marshall as Gloria Gibbons
- Treva Etienne as Aubrey Gibbons
- Michael Smiley as Tim Thomas
- Jodhi May as Marjorie Wallace
- Jack Bandeira as Wayne Kennedy
- Kinga Preis as Sister Nowak
- Amarah-Jae St. Aubyn as Greta Gibbons
- Tony Richardson as Dr. John Rees
- Declan Joyce as George Kennedy

== Production ==
In February 2020, it was announced that Letitia Wright and Tamara Lawrance had been cast as twin sisters June and Jennifer Gibbons in the film The Silent Twins, with Agnieszka Smoczyńska set to direct and Andrea Seigel set to write the screenplay, marking Smoczyńska's English-language film debut. The director had initially considered using CGI to allow Wright to play both of the identical twins, but felt it was important that there be a tangible relationship between the characters. Focus Features acquired US distribution rights to the film while parent company Universal Pictures took international distribution rights. Principal photography wrapped in Poland.

== Release ==
The Silent Twins had its world premiere at the 2022 Cannes Film Festival, under the Un Certain Regard section, on May 24, 2022. It was released in the United States by Focus Features on September 16, 2022, and was released in the United Kingdom by Universal Pictures on December 9. It also screened in the 'World Cinema' section of 27th Busan International Film Festival in October 2022.

== Reception ==
On the review aggregator website Rotten Tomatoes, 69% of 84 critics' reviews are positive, with an average rating of 6.3/10. The website's consensus reads, "Although it struggles to really get inside the true story that inspired it, The Silent Twins is still a well-acted and poignant dramatization of actual events." Metacritic, which uses a weighted average, assigned the film a score of 59 out of 100, based on 25 critics, indicating "mixed or average reviews".
