= Laggies =

2014 film by Lynn Shelton

- Theatrical release poster
- Directed by: Lynn Shelton
- Written by: Andrea Seigel
- Produced by: Steve Golin; Alix Madigan-Yorkin; Rosalie Swedlin; Myles Nestel; Kevin Frakes; Raj Brinder Singh
- Starring: Keira Knightley; Chloë Grace Moretz; Sam Rockwell; Kaitlyn Dever; Jeff Garlin; Ellie Kemper; Mark Webber; Daniel Zovatto
- Cinematography: Benjamin Kasulke
- Edited by: Nat Sanders
- Music by: Benjamin Gibbard
- Production companies: Anonymous Content; The Solution Entertainment Group
- Distributed by: A24
- Release dates: January 17, 2014 (Sundance); October 24, 2014 (United States)
- Running time: 100 minutes
- Country: United States
- Language: English
- Box office: $2.4 million

Laggies (released in the United Kingdom as Say When) is a 2014 American romantic comedy-drama film directed by Lynn Shelton and written by Andrea Seigel. It stars Keira Knightley, Chloë Grace Moretz, Sam Rockwell, Kaitlyn Dever, Jeff Garlin, Ellie Kemper, Mark Webber, and Daniel Zovatto. It tells the story of a 28-year-old woman who experiencing a quarter-life crisis upon her longtime boyfriend proposing escapes for a week where she hides out in the home of her new 16-year-old friend and her single father. The film premiered at the Sundance Film Festival on January 17, 2014, and was given a limited theatrical release in the United States on October 24, 2014, by A24. It was met with mixed reviews.

== Plot ==
Megan is an aimless 28-year-old living in Seattle who is in a committed relationship with her high school sweetheart, Anthony, and is still close with her high school friends. At her friend Allison's wedding, Anthony unexpectedly proposes. She also sees her father cheating on her mother.

Shocked and confused, she flees and runs into teenager Annika and her friends outside a grocery store. After buying them alcohol, Megan plays with their skateboard. When they ask her to join them on their night out, she does.

Returning home, Anthony suggests that rather than having a big wedding, they elope. Megan agrees but delays the wedding by pretending she has a week-long career advice seminar to attend.

Megan receives a call from Annika asking her to pretend to be her absentee mother at a guidance counselor's meeting. She goes to the meeting and then asks Annika if, in return, she can stay at her house.

Annika is unsuccessful at sneaking Megan into her house, where her single-parent lawyer father Craig questions Megan about her relationship with his daughter. While she is candid with him about her existential crisis, she lies that there is a one-week gap between her lease expiring and her move into a new apartment. Craig reluctantly allows her to stay and gradually begins to trust her. Annika asks Megan to drive her to her estranged mother's house to see her for the first time in years.

Craig asks Megan out for a drink. When they return—having had more drinks than they planned—they end up having sex. The next morning, he offers to let her stay longer than the week she asked for, but she declines.

Annika, seeing them kiss, tentatively tells Megan that she approves of the relationship. She then finds the engagement ring in her purse. Megan tells her she's engaged, and that Craig has no idea. On the way home from shopping for Annika's prom dress, they begin arguing, and her friend Patrick is distracted and crashes the car. He tells Megan he has been drinking the wine she bought for them because he is upset that his parents are sending him to boarding school.

Feeling guilty, Megan tells the police she was the one driving the car. She still has alcohol on her breath from that morning and is arrested. When Craig arrives to free her, Megan reveals her engagement and that she bought alcohol for his daughter.

Megan's father picks her up at the police station. He says he has confessed his cheating to her mother and they are trying to work things out.

Annika's friend Misty shows up at Megan's door with the white dress she bought and a few other things she had left in Patrick's car and tries to convince Megan to go to the prom. When Anthony comes to the door, they tell him Misty is a girl she was mentoring at the seminar. Once he goes back upstairs, Misty gives Megan a prom ticket, urging her to go for Annika's benefit.

Megan continues to lie to Anthony about where she was for the past week. At the airport, on their way to elope in Las Vegas, Anthony takes a selfie of them, sending it to their high school friends. Megan, realizing their relationship is stifling her, breaks up with him, unfriends her high school friends, and goes to Annika's prom, where she tells Annika to be honest and pursue Junior, a friend with whom she is in love.

Megan goes to Craig's house and leaves him a box of wine with a note that says, 'Can we try again? Check [Yes] or [No]". She knocks, then hides at the bottom of the steps. Craig answers the door, reads the note, sees Megan at the bottom of the steps, and closes the door. Not to be deterred, she knocks again, then picks up the house key hidden outside—but before she can unlock the door, Craig opens it again and lets her in.

== Cast ==
- Keira Knightley as Megan Burch
  - Larissa Schmitz as young Megan Burch
- Chloë Grace Moretz as Annika Hunter
- Sam Rockwell as Craig Hunter
- Ellie Kemper as Allison
  - Sarah Lynn Wright as young Allison
- Mark Webber as Anthony
  - Phillip Abraham as young Anthony
- Kaitlyn Dever as Misty
- Tiya Sircar as Zareena
- Gretchen Mol as Bethany
- Jeff Garlin as Mr. Burch
- Sara Coates as Savannah
  - Rocki DuCharme as young Savannah
- Louis Hobson as Theo
- Kirsten deLohr Helland as Danielle
  - Maura Lindsay as young Danielle
- Daniel Zovatto as Junior
- Dylan Arnold as Patrick

== Title ==
The writer and director have explained that choosing the title Laggies was a complex decision. Shelton said she had never heard the term before making the film, but that screenwriter Andrea Seigel insisted it was a common term for adult slackers. As the film was made, Shelton realized that no one but Seigel had heard of laggies before, but the title stuck. The film was released in the United Kingdom as Say When and in France as Girls Only.

== Production ==
Before Knightley joined the film, Anne Hathaway was attached to lead with Moretz, but left the project due to scheduling conflicts with Interstellar. It was announced in December 2013 that Laggies would be in the 2014 Sundance Film Festival lineup. Principal photography began the first week of June 2013 in and around Seattle. Filming took place at 23 locations over a 26-day shoot, and wrapped in early July. Sam Rockwell got lyme disease while filming the movie and had to be briefly hospitalized.

== Reception ==
On Rotten Tomatoes, the film holds an approval rating of 64% based on 115 reviews, with an average rating of 6/10. The website's critics consensus reads, "Laggies may not do as much with its ideas as it could, but it's buoyed by a winsome performance from Keira Knightley, as well as Lynn Shelton's empathetic direction." Metacritic, which uses a weighted average, assigned the film a score of 63 out of 100, based on 32 critics, indicating "generally favorable" reviews.
