= The Silent Twins (1986 film) =

- Written by: Marjorie Wallace
- Directed by: Jon Amiel
- Starring: Shirley Parker; Sharon Parker
- Composer: Nicholas Carr
- Country of origin: United Kingdom
- Original language: English

Production
- Producer: Martin Thompson
- Cinematography: Ken Westbury
- Editor: Bill Wright
- Running time: 85 minutes
- Production company: Screen Two

Original release
- Network: BBC2
- Release: 19 January 1986

The Silent Twins is a 1986 television film directed by Jon Amiel. It was broadcast as Season 2, Episode 2 of Screen Two. It was based on a 1986 book of the same title by Marjorie Wallace, who also wrote the screenplay.

The Silent Twins is based on the true story of June and Jennifer Gibbons, identical twins who grew up in Wales. They were given the "Silent Twins" nickname because they only communicated with each other. Both women were committed to Broadmoor Mental Health Hospital for 14 years.
