= Tim Crow =

British psychiatrist (1938–2024)

- Born: 7 June 1938; London, England
- Died: 10 November 2024 (aged 86)
- Occupations: Psychiatrist, researcher

Academic background
- Education: London University; University of Aberdeen

Timothy John Crow, OBE FMedSci (7 June 1938 – 10 November 2024) was a British psychiatrist and researcher. Much of his research was related to finding the causes of schizophrenia. He also had an interest in neurology and evolutionary theory. He was the Honorary Director of the Prince of Wales International Centre for Research into Schizophrenia and Depression. He qualified at the Royal London Hospital in 1964 and obtained a PhD at the University of Aberdeen, Scotland in 1970. He was a Fellow of the Royal College of Physicians, the Royal College of Psychiatrists and the Academy of Medical Sciences. Crow was, for twenty years, Head of the Division of Psychiatry of the Medical Research Council (MRC) Clinical Research Centre at Northwick Park Hospital and then a member of the External Scientific Staff of the MRC in Oxford.

== Research ==
=== Neurobiology of reinforcement and motivation ===
Crow worked in the Department of Physiology at the University of Aberdeen in the late 1960s and early 1970s, where he conducted pharmacological and behavioural studies of reinforcement and self-stimulation in rats for his Medical Research Council funded PhD: "Experiments on the central actions of the amphetamines with particular reference to the functions of catecholamine-containing neurones". He published a number of papers dissecting the role of the various catecholamines in reinforcement and motivation, and in 1973 was the first person to publish an article arguing for a key role for the neurotransmitter dopamine in 'incentive motivation'. Crow's role as the first scientist to link dopamine to incentive motivation has been acknowledged by Berridge and by Robbins and Everitt.

=== Psychosis and schizophrenia ===
In 1978 Crow, in conjunction with his colleague Eve Johnstone and others, showed that the anti-psychotic drug, flupentixol, reduced the severity of schizophrenic delusions specifically because of its action on the neurotransmitter dopamine. Johnstone, Crow and colleagues were also the first to demonstrate, by randomised double-blind clinical trials, that electroconvulsive therapy (ECT) could reduce the symptoms of endogenous depression, albeit over a short time period. This finding has been substantially replicated in many other settings.

Crow's long term research interests were in the nature and causation of the major psychoses. These illnesses are characterised by the presence of delusions, hallucinations, and disorders of thinking that generally start in early and middle adult life. Encompassing schizophrenia and manic-depressive psychosis, these disorders are common, being diagnosed in around 2% of the population in the course of a lifetime, but with wide cultural variation.

In the first CT scan study in 1976 Crow and colleagues at Northwick Park Hospital demonstrated that there are, across groups, structural differences in the brain (e.g. a degree of enlargement of the cerebral ventricles) in individuals who have suffered from schizophrenia compared to healthy people. Much subsequent work with MRI scans and in post-mortem brain studies has confirmed this, suggesting that the differences are in the cerebral cortex and are particularly related to the subtle asymmetries that are characteristic of the human cortex. Crow also demonstrated that people with schizophrenia show less left-sided cerebral dominance for some components of language.

In the 1980s, Crow published an article, focusing on the classification of the symptoms of the disease rather than focusing on the cluster of symptoms in individual patients, that became a breakthrough in the field of research on schizophrenia. He also introduced the idea of two syndromes of schizophrenia one based on positive symptoms and the other on negative symptoms, which contributed to an understanding of the cognitive nature of schizophrenia.

In 1989, Crow was awarded the Lieber Prize for Outstanding Achievement In Schizophrenia Research. In a retrospective review of 20 years of evidence of neurodevelopmental abnormalities in the brains of people with schizophrenia, Sir Robin Murray described the work of Johnstone and Crow on ventricular enlargement and negative symptoms in psychosis as being widely regarded by British psychiatrists as ‘marking the beginning of modern schizophrenia research’.

=== Psychosis and Human Evolution ===
Based on the supposition that language and psychosis are specifically human conditions, Crow spent his later career investigating the implications for schizophrenia of the occurrence of cerebral asymmetry in humans but not chimpanzees. Further work on handedness, heritability of psychosis, sex differences in age of onset in schizophrenia, and genes on the sex chromosomes in schizophrenia contributed to a large, but as yet unresolved, body of work on the contribution of the sex chromosomes, to brain development and function, including propensity to schizophrenia.

== Death ==
Crow died from complications of Parkinson's disease on 10 November 2024, at the age of 86.
