= Ghost Team =

- Theatrical release poster
- Directed by: Oliver Irving
- Screenplay by: Peter Warren
- Story by: Oliver Irving; Peter Warren
- Produced by: Julie Christeas; Schuyler Weiss; Alex Sagalchik; Oliver Irving; Clem McIntosh
- Starring: Jon Heder; David Krumholtz; Melonie Diaz; Paul W. Downs; Justin Long; Amy Sedaris
- Cinematography: Timothy Naylor
- Edited by: Oliver Irving
- Music by: Joe Hastings
- Production companies: Tandem Pictures; Neuve Capital; Mott Street Pictures; Preferred Content
- Distributed by: The Orchard; Sony Pictures Releasing
- Release date: August 12, 2016 (United States)
- Running time: 85 minutes
- Country: United States
- Language: English

Ghost Team is a 2016 independent comedy-thriller film directed by Oliver Irving from a screenplay by Peter Warren, based on a story by Irving and Warren. The film's cast includes Jon Heder, David Krumholtz, Melonie Diaz, Paul W. Downs with Justin Long and Amy Sedaris. Ghost Team examines the things some people believe in to escape the monotony of everyday life and get through the day.

The film was released on August 12, 2016, by The Orchard and Sony Pictures.

== Plot ==
Louis is a paranormal-obsessed copy shop owner looking to escape his monotonous life. When a customer having "No Trespassing" signs made mentions he owns a barn that might be haunted, Louis recruits a dysfunctional team – his depressed best friend Stan; misfit nephew Zak; a cable access "medium" calling herself Victoria; Ellie, a beautician who works in the same strip mall; and Ross, an overeager security guard – to investigate, partially as an application to join a TV show called Ghost Getters. With equipment acquired by Zak, the group drives out to the barn on a Saturday afternoon.

In tribute to the "Ghost Getters", Louis has made T-shirts for his group labelled "Ghost Team", which Zak refuses to wear. The Team set up an observation post, hold a seance, then split up to look around. After recording some things, they check some of their audio, and discover what they think is EVP. At this point, the Team realizes Victoria is missing. While searching for her, Zak, Stan and Ross also disappear, and then Louis and Ellie find the reason: the barn is the home of a meth lab, being run by the sign customer, Mitch, whose employees have been capturing them as trespassers. They set the lab on fire and leave the Team to die.

The Team escape the burning lab and get away from Mitch and his goons, except for Victoria. Mitch uses her as a hostage to force the Team to let him leave on his boat, and to not report anything they saw. He changes his mind and decides to kill them instead. Victoria convinces Mitch that she is channeling his father, giving Louis the chance to shoot him with Ross' paintball gun, incapacitating him. The meth lab then explodes.

The Team contact police, who take their statements and arrest Mitch. Having bonded, the group drives home, singing along to "Dream Weaver".

== Cast ==
- Jon Heder as Louis
- David Krumholtz as Stan
- Melonie Diaz as Ellie
- Paul W. Downs as Zak
- Justin Long as Ross
- Amy Sedaris as Victoria
- Tom Schiller as Mitch
- Joel Marsh Garland as Hammer
- Jason Hawes as himself (Cameo)
- Steve Gonsalves as himself (Cameo)

== Production ==
Principal photography on Ghost Team took place during fall 2015 in New York, on Long Island and in Brooklyn. Casting and production was first announced by Deadline Hollywood. Ghost Team is produced by Julie Christeas and Schuyler Weiss of Tandem Pictures, Alex Sagalchik of Mott Street Pictures, Clem McIntosh and director Oliver Irving, with Kevin Iwashina of Preferred Content serving as Executive Producer.

Ghost Team is the first feature film to use the new Tango Steadicam, created by American cinematographer Garrett Brown, inventor of the Steadicam.

Under Irving’s direction the movie, which was filmed in New York, completed principal photography in 17 days. Driven to avoid the typical backlit night scenes often seen in horror films, the filmmakers only used practical sources such as flashlights, gas lanterns and glow sticks to light the nighttime scenes.

== Distribution ==
It was announced on November 12, 2015, that The Orchard and Sony Pictures had acquired North American, U.K., Australian, and New Zealand distribution rights for Ghost Team. The film is slated for general release 12 August 2016, and On Demand on 30 August. In July 2016 it was made available at no charge, exclusively and for a limited time, on Google Play. The film was released on Netflix on 30 November 2016.

== Reception ==
It has a score of 22% on Metacritic.

Initial critical response was largely negative.
