= Jack Bandeira =

English actor (born 1994)

- Born: 29 March 1994 (age 32); Middlesbrough, England, United Kingdom
- Education: London Academy of Music and Dramatic Art (BA)
- Occupation: Actor
- Years active: 2013–present

Jack Bandeira (born 29 March 1994) is an English actor. He is known for his roles in television series Vera, Silent Witness, Happy Valley and Lockwood & Co. He has also appeared in films such as The Silent Twins, Venom: Let There Be Carnage, and The Duke.

== Career ==
Bandeira trained at London Academy of Music and Dramatic Art. After that he appeared in many roles in different TV series, such as The Witcher, Sex Education, and Happy Valley. He also appeared in The Gold, Black Mirror, and Andor.

He has appeared in multiple films, such as The Duke, Gunpowder Milkshake, Venom: Let There Be Carnage, and The Silent Twins.

== Filmography ==
=== Television ===
Year	Title	Role	Notes
2017	Holby City	Scott Barlette	Episode: "Hiding Places"
2018	Vera	Adam Jannen	Episode: "Darkwater"
2019	The Witcher	Caldemeyn	Episode: "Much More"
2020	Sex Education	Eli	Episode: "Episode 2"
2020	Noughts + Crosses	Carl	Episode #1.1
2020	Cold Courage	Monty	2 episodes
2020	Young Wallander	Markus	Episode: "Episode 1"
2021	Silent Witness	Ollie	4 episodes
2023	Lockwood & Co.	Quill Kipps	6 episodes
2023	Happy Valley	Matija Jankovic	6 episodes
2023	Black Mirror	Terry	Episode: "Mazey Day"
2024	Smoggie Queens	Wayne	Episode: "A Smoggie Pride"
2025	Andor	Rowd	2 episodes
2025	The Gold	Scott Errico	2 episodes

=== Animation ===
List of voice performances in animation
Year	Title	Role(s)	Notes
2023	Unicorn: Warriors Eternal	Aelwulf	Episode: "The Heart of Kings"

=== Film ===
Year	Title	Role	Notes
2018	Wasteland	Security Guard	
2019	The King	Cambridge's Steward	
2020	The Duke	Kenny Bunton	
2021	Gunpowder Milkshake	Crow	
2021	Venom: Let There Be Carnage	Young Cletus Kasady	
2022	The Silent Twins	Wayne Kennedy	
2022	After Ever Happy	James	
2022	My Policeman	Leonard	
2026	Think of England	Corporal Evans	
TBA	Vindicta	Klaus	Post-production

=== Video games ===
Year	Title	Role	Notes	Ref.
2022	As Dusk Falls	Dale Holt (face and voice)	Xbox One	

=== Music video ===
Year	Song	Role	Singer
2024	Wife Once	Metz	Memory of Speke
2025	The Tape is Chill	Elsker	Peter Zummo
