= Bryan Pringle =

British actor (1935–2002)

- Pringle in The Early Bird (1965)
- Born: 19 January 1935; Glascote, Tamworth, Staffordshire, England
- Died: 15 May 2002 (aged 67); London, England
- Education: Royal Academy of Dramatic Art
- Occupation: Actor theatre,
- Years active: 1955–2002 (theatre, TV and film)
- Spouse: Anne Jameson (m. 1958; died 1999)
- Children: 2

Bryan Pringle (19 January 1935 – 15 May 2002) was an English character actor who appeared for several decades in theatre, television and film productions

== Life and career ==
Pringle was born in Glascote, Tamworth, Staffordshire, and then was brought up in the Lancashire town of Bolton. After boarding at St Bees School, Cumberland, he trained at the Royal Academy of Dramatic Art, London, winning the 1954 Bancroft Gold Medal, graduating in 1955 with an Acting (RADA Diploma).

In 1958, he married character actress Anne Jameson; together they had two children. She died in 1999, three years before he did.

=== Theatre work ===
Pringle started as a member of the Old Vic company between 1955 and 1957, appearing with Coral Browne, John Neville, Claire Bloom and others in several Shakespeare plays and touring with four of them - Romeo and Juliet, Richard II, Troilus and Cressida and Macbeth. He then moved to Nottingham Playhouse, where he appeared in the Willis Hall drama Boys It's All Hell. There, Lindsay Anderson remounted it as The Long and the Short and the Tall at the Royal Court Theatre in January 1959; also starring Peter O'Toole and Robert Shaw, the play transferred to the New Theatre in April. Later that year, in October, Pringle appeared opposite Robert Shaw again in Guy Hamilton's production of the Beverley Cross play One More River at the Duke of York's Theatre.

In 1961 he was at Theatre Workshop, working with Joan Littlewood on the Henry Livings play Big Soft Nellie. (Ten years later he was top-billed in Michael Apted's TV version of the same play for Granada Television.) Then, having joined the Royal Shakespeare Company, he scored two personal successes in the summer of 1964, first as Stanley in Harold Pinter's The Birthday Party (directed by the playwright), then as the dustbin-bound Nagg in the Samuel Beckett play Endgame. Among later theatre credits, he starred with Jane Asher and Brian Murphy in the Romain Weingarten play Summer at the Fortune Theatre in 1968, appeared as Malvolio in Twelfth Night at the Bankside Globe in 1973 (reprising the role at the Ludlow Festival 15 years later), was Michael Crawford's father in Billy at the Theatre Royal Drury Lane in 1974, returned to Nottingham Playhouse in 1977 to play Dogberry in Much Ado About Nothing and appeared opposite David Suchet in the John Hopkins play This Story of Yours (Hampstead Theatre, 1987). In his final decade he appeared in major revivals of My Fair Lady (as Doolittle; 1992) and Joe Orton's Entertaining Mr Sloane (as Kemp; 1999–2001).

=== Film work ===
Pringle appeared in many films, beginning with Saturday Night and Sunday Morning (1960) as Rachel Roberts' cuckolded husband. In 1962 he appeared briefly as a driver in Lawrence of Arabia, and while uncredited, delivers the final line of the film. He also appeared alongside Norman Wisdom in the comedy film The Early Bird (1965), as the treacherous rival milkman, Austin, the role for which he is perhaps best remembered. He continued to be cast in many notable films, such as French Dressing and The Boyfriend (both for director Ken Russell), Brazil (1985), Drowning by Numbers and B. Monkey.

=== Television work ===
Pringle also made numerous television appearances, gaining fame as 'Cheese & Egg' in the Granada Television sitcom The Dustbinmen (1969–70). Earlier, he was Charles Pooter in Diary of a Nobody, made by Ken Russell for BBC 2 in 1964; also for the BBC, he played Len Wiles, adoptive father of Terry Wiles, in On Giant's Shoulders in 1979, Pistol in Shakespeare's Henry IV Part II and Henry V the same year, and Sergeant Match in a 1987 version of the Joe Orton play What the Butler Saw.

In 1980 he played Albert Case, leader of a group of villains in The Professionals episode Weekend in the Country. Other notable appearances were as landlord Arthur Pringle in Series 2 of Auf Wiedersehen, Pet (1986), as Barker in the Inspector Morse episode Deceived by Flight (1989), and as pathologist Felix Norman in Prime Suspect (1991). He played the part of the farmer Mr. Grimsdale in the second series of "All Creatures Great and Small". Pringle also appeared in 1985 in a well-known TV commercial advertising Heineken beer, playing a cockney elocutionist attempting to teach an upper-class woman (Sylvestra Le Touzel) how to say "The wa'er in Major'a don' taste like wot id ough' 'a" ("The water in Majorca don't taste like what it ought to").

In the early 1980s he also appeared in a series of International Direct Dialling adverts. In the first advert he had the classic line "Sydney who?" only to be told "Not Sydney who, Sydney Australia", at which point the shock causes him to forcefully spit out a mouthful of tea he has just taken. The theme continued in further adverts.

== Death ==
In later life Pringle lived in Northamptonshire, where he died on 15 May 2002; he was buried alongside his wife in the cemetery of St Laurence Church in Brafield on the Green.

== Selected filmography ==
- The Challenge (1960) – sergeant
- Saturday Night and Sunday Morning (1960) – Jack
- H.M.S. Defiant (1962) – Sgt Kneebone
- Lawrence of Arabia (1962) – driver (uncredited)
- French Dressing (1964) – the Mayor
- The Early Bird (1965) – Austin
- How I Won the War (1967) – reporter
- Berserk! (1967) – Constable Bradford
- Diamonds for Breakfast (1968) – police sergeant
- Spring and Port Wine (1970) – bowler 3
- The Boy Friend (1971) – Percy Parkhill / Percy Browne
- Mister Quilp (1975) – Mr Garland
- Jabberwocky (1977) – guard at gate
- Bullshot (1983) – waiter
- The Young Visiters (1984) – Minnit the butler
- Brazil (1985) – Spiro
- Haunted Honeymoon (1986) – Pfister
- Consuming Passions (1988) – gateman
- Drowning by Numbers (1988) – Jake
- Inspector Morse (1989) – Barker (The Porter)
- Getting It Right (1989) – Mr Lamb
- Crimestrike (1990) – Super
- Three Men and a Little Lady (1990) – old Englishman
- American Friends (1991) – Haskell
- The Steal (1995) – Cecil, bank doorman
- Restoration (1995) – watchman
- Snow White: A Tale of Terror (1997) – Father Gilbert
- The Legend of 1900 (1998) – civil servant
- B. Monkey (1998) – Goodchild
- Darkness Falls (1999) – Mr Hayter
- Lover's Prayer (2001) – Stepan

=== Television ===
Year	Title	Role	Notes
1965	Hereward the Wake	Martin Lightfoot	
1965	The Sullavan Brothers	Alderman Slater	
1965	Gideon's Way	John Stewart	Episode "Subway To Revenge"
1966	The Caramel Crisis	McWithers	
1968−1970	The Dustbinmen	Cheese & Egg	
1973	Public Eye	Donald Reading	Episode "Home & Away"
1974	The Pallisers	Mr Monk	
1974	Some Mothers Do 'Ave 'Em	Mr Jackson	
1975	The Growing Pains of PC Penrose	Sergeant Flagg	
1979	Henry V	Pistol	
1980	The Good Companions		
1980	The Professionals (TV Series)	Case	Episode S4 E13 "Weekend In The Country" December 14, 1980
1981	When The Boat Comes In	Doughty	
1982	The Bell	Patchway	
1983	Last of the Summer Wine	Ludovic	Episode "Cheering Up Ludovic"
1984	Cockles	Ernie	
1985	Auf Wiedersehen, Pet	Arthur Pringle	
1987	Hardwicke House	Councillor Hodgkins	Episode 4 "Prize Giving", not shown. On YouTube 2019.
1988	King and Castle	George Fossett	Series 2 "Dim Sums" aired 17 May 1988.
1988	All Creatures Great and Small	Grimsdale	
1990	Wish Me Luck	Father Martin	
1991	Prime Suspect	Felix Norman	
1991	Rumpole Of The Bailey	Ben Baker	
1994	Moving Story	Branwell	
1997	A Prince Among Men	Vince Hibbert	
1997	Snow White: A Tale of Terror	Father Gilbert	
2003	Barbara	Mr Cooper	(final appearance)
