= Handsome (film) =

2017 film by Jeff Garlin

- Official release poster
- Directed by: Jeff Garlin
- Written by: Jeff Garlin; Andrea Seigel
- Produced by: Brad Morris; Andrew Secunda
- Starring: Jeff Garlin; Natasha Lyonne; Amy Sedaris; Leah Remini; Christine Woods; Steven Weber
- Cinematography: Jason Blount
- Edited by: Jon Corn
- Music by: Ben Folds
- Production company: JZM Films
- Distributed by: Netflix
- Release date: May 5, 2017
- Running time: 81 minutes
- Country: United States
- Language: English

Handsome (also known as Handsome: A Netflix Mystery Movie) is a 2017 American comedy mystery film directed by Jeff Garlin and written by Garlin and Andrea Seigel. The film stars Garlin, Natasha Lyonne, Amy Sedaris, Leah Remini, Christine Woods and Steven Weber. It was released on Netflix on May 5, 2017.

== Plot ==
LA police detective Gene Handsome visits the house of a new neighbor and meets her babysitter, Heather Dromgoole. The next day, Handsome and his partner, Fleur Scozzari, find Dromgoole has been murdered and dismembered outside the home of actor Talbert Bacorn, with her body parts having been staged into the shape of the Star of David. Bacorn claims that at the time of the murder, he was inside caring for his neighbor's dog and watching a TV rebroadcast of one of his early films.

Handsome's neighbor, Nora, says Dromgoole was a good babysitter despite stealing several things. Handsome babysits Nora's daughter so Nora can go to work. When she returns, Nora tells Handsome that Dromgoole had a roommate, Amanda.

While interviewing Amanda, Handsome and Scozzari see an extravagant body lotion on Dromgoole's dresser. Amanda says she believes she received it from an older man, Nora's ex, Lloyd. Lloyd denies a sexual relationship, saying he was a father figure. The medical examiner tells Handsome Dromgoole's body contains traces of an expensive skincare cream and has a round depression in her skull.

After examining Dromgoole's phone records, Handsome confronts Lloyd, who admits he hired Dromgoole to spy on his ex-wife. Handsome notices Lloyd's company's coffee table book, which contains a photograph of Dromgoole and Bacorn attending the same sponsored event. Nora visits Handsome and during a conversation they realize they have had the same dream about escaping their current lives to live in the country and care for dogs.

Lloyd explains that the picture of Dromgoole and Bacorn was taken at a celebrity gala where he provided the fireworks and Dromgoole tagged along, pretending to be his assistant. Annoyed she could not take one of the "swag bags" given to celebrities at the event, which included expensive toiletries, she befriended Bacorn. When Handsome arrives at Bacorn's house to re-interview him, he discovers that the handles of the neighbor's tools contain traces of skincare cream. At Bacorn's house, Handsome notices that Bacorn is using the same brand of skincare cream as the lotion from Dromgoole's apartment. Bacorn says he received it and the body lotion at the party Dromgoole and he attended, and he gave the lotion to her. Handsome spots a large award in Bacorn's bedroom, something which could have caused Dromgoole's head injury.

Handsome denigrates Bacorn's acting and he blows up, confirming Handsome's suspicion that Bacorn is prone to violent anger. Bacorn admits that Dromgoole and he had sex after the party, during which she ridiculed his acting. Bacorn killed her, then dismembered her using his neighbor's tools. He dumped her body on his own lawn, assuming no one would suspect him because that would be too obvious. Bacorn attacks Handsome, but Scozzari arrives and saves him. Nora says they cannot date because she is moving to the country to work giving massages to dogs. Handsome returns to his regular routine.

== Cast ==
- Jeff Garlin as Gene Handsome
- Natasha Lyonne as Detective Fleur Scozzari
- Amy Sedaris as Lieutenant Tucker
- Leah Remini as Esta
- Christine Woods as Nora Vanderwheel
- Steven Weber as Talbert Bacorn
- Megan Ferguson as Amanda
- Dave Sheridan as The Sketchy Guy
- Josie Totah (Note: Credited as J. J. Totah; she came out as transgender in 2018.) as Charles
- Ava Acres as Carys Vanderwheel
- Chris Redd as Detective Gunner
- Timm Sharp as Lloyd Vanderwheel
- Hailee Keanna Lautenbach as Heather Dromgoole
- Eddie Pepitone as Durante
- Joe Kenda as Detective Joe
- Kaley Cuoco as herself

== Release ==
On June 14, 2016, Netflix acquired distribution rights to the film, and released it on their service on May 5, 2017.
