= Terry Wiles =

British actor and victim of thalidomide

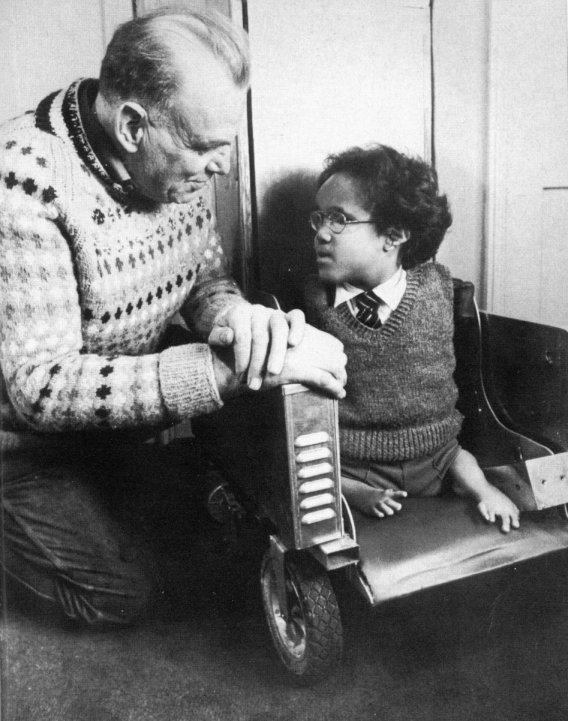
Len and Terry Wiles c. 1970

Terrence 'Terry' Wiles (born 12 January 1962) was one of the most visible thalidomide babies born in the United Kingdom. He has since become known internationally through the Emmy Award winning television drama On Giant's Shoulders and the best-selling book of the same name.

== Early life ==
He was born as Andrew Maulle in Peterborough, England to a 17-year-old prostitute mother and a visiting African-American father. During her pregnancy Andrew's mother took the sedative thalidomide to combat her morning sickness, resulting in his severe physical disabilities at birth.

Unable to cope with his disabilities and suspecting he would not survive, Andy's mother left him at the hospital, this abandonment resulting in him being put into care. He met Hazel (née Brooker) (1931-2013) and Leonard George Wiles (1911–1995) at Chailey Hospital in Sussex in October 1967, and after initial opposition from his birth mother and Social Services, Leonard and Hazel were able to adopt the young Andrew. As part of his fresh start with his new parents, Andrew decided to change his name to Terrence Wiles.

Over the following years Len Wiles, who was technically minded and helped to design military equipment during World War II, built a series of 'Supercars' for Terry, based on the forklift truck, which enabled Terry to both augment his height and move around freely for the first time. He had a nervous breakdown due to bullying and abuse at his secondary school Ernulf Community College in St. Neots, where on one occasion some students put him in a holdall and dragged him around a room. He left the school to study at a polytechnic.

He attended California State University at Fullerton in the early 1980s.

== On Giant's Shoulders ==
Then aged 17, Wiles played himself in a 1979 BBC television Play of the Week drama entitled On Giant's Shoulders, starring Bryan Pringle as Leonard Wiles and Judi Dench, who was nominated for a BAFTA for her role as Hazel Wiles. The drama was directed by Anthony Simmons. The film was based on Marjorie Wallace and Michael Robson's book of the same name published in 1976.

Terry Wiles had never acted before and, as he was then 17, his voice had to be dubbed by a child actor after filming as it had broken and he had to appear to be much younger, playing himself from age 9 to 12. The drama went on to win an Emmy in 1980. Following the film's broadcast in the United States in 1980 Wiles was interviewed on Good Morning America and The Mike Douglas Show.

== Recent years ==
After Wiles received financial compensation for his birth defects, he and his adoptive parents emigrated to New Zealand. Later, in 1986 at a conference for disabled children, Wiles met Robyn (born 1960), a married nurse who left her husband in June 1988 to be with him. The couple faced a great deal of opposition from both families; Wiles' parents believed that Robyn was only interested in his money, the financial payout that he had received from the thalidomide manufacturers (Distillers Company). However, despite this opposition the couple married on 13 October 1990 at their two-bedroom villa-style home in Hamilton in New Zealand. Twenty-five guests attended the ceremony; Terry's mother, Hazel, was absent, though his father, Len, was present. Following the marriage, len and Hazel Wiles severed all contact with couple and returned to England in 1993. Terry learned of his adoptive father's death in 1995 through the Thalidomide Society, and he never heard Hazel Wiles again before death in Cambrdigeshire in 2013.

Terry and his wife continue to live in New Zealand, where Terry counselled others with disabilities. In 1997, Channel 4 filmed Terry and Robyn in New Zealand for a documentary entitled Fight For Love, in which they discussed how they met, and how they had to fight their families and the views of society in order to be together.
