= The Passing Stranger =

1954 British film by John Arnold

- Directed by: John Arnold
- Written by: John Arnold
- Based on: an original story by Anthony Simmons
- Produced by: Anthony Simmons; Ian Gibson-Smith
- Starring: Lee Patterson; Diane Cilento; Duncan Lamont
- Cinematography: Walter Lassally
- Edited by: Alvin Bailey
- Music by: Ken Sykora
- Production company: Harlequin Productions
- Distributed by: Independent Film Distributors
- Release date: 29 November 1954
- Running time: 84 minutes
- Country: United Kingdom
- Language: English

The Passing Stranger is a 1954 British crime film written and directed by John Arnold, and starring Lee Patterson, Diane Cilento and Duncan Lamont. It was produced by Anthony Simmons, who also wrote the original film story, and Ian Gibson-Smith, with Leon Clore as executive producer for Harlequin Productions.

== Plot ==
Chick, an American soldier serving in Europe, has deserted and is trying to find his way back to the US. After falling in with a gang of criminals, he is on the run after a robbery went wrong, and hides up at a roadside café near a small British town (Banbury). One of the owners of the café, Jill, falls for him and they make a plan to run away together.

== Cast ==
- Lee Patterson as Chick
- Diane Cilento as Jill
- Duncan Lamont as Fred
- Olive Gregg as Meg
- Liam Redmond as Barnes
- Harold Lang as Spicer
- Mark Dignam as Inspector
- Paul Whitsun-Jones as Lloyd
- Alfie Bass as Harry
- Cameron Hall as Maxie
- George A. Cooper as Charlie
- Lyndon Brook as Mike
- Harry H. Corbett as Cafe Patron

== Critical reception ==
Monthly Film Bulletin said "There is evidence, in this film of modest means, of an attempt to break out of the usually shoddy straitjacket of British second features. Technically, in all departments except sound, The Passing Stranger is well above the average of its kind; but its story is implausible, thinly written and poorly constructed, its characterisation unconvincing, and its direction fails to impose any clear narrative grasp. Its human portraiture, and sense of locale – except for some atmospherically shot locations – is in fact strenuously unreal. Lee Patterson and Duncan Lamont play very adequately, Diane Cilento is miscast but has an interesting personality, and the rest of the acting is poor."

Kine Weekly said "The picture opens promisingly but its characters soon prove to be cardboard and instead of getting down to brass tacks wear their hearts on their sleeves and talk their heads off. Lee Patterson fails, through no fault of his own, to achieve the impossible and convince as the embittered Chick. Diane Cilento looks a sight as Jill, Duncan Lamont is a fish out of water as Fred, and the rest are merely uncomfortable passengers. There is a signature tune, intended to give it tone, but it's little more than a wail. As for the settings, they're as cheerless as the plot."

var

In British Sound Films: The Studio Years 1928–1959 David Quinlan rated the film as "average", writing: "Ambitious second-feature lacks basic material."

TV Guide wrote "This decent second feature tries hard but fails because of script limitations."

Allmovie called it "a passing good little film noir."
