= John Chaffey =

John Chaffey is an English osteopathic doctor and former child film actor.

== Film career ==
Chaffey was featured in many television adverts as a child. He is best remembered for a role in the 1973 Peter Sellers movie The Optimists of Nine Elms.

== Medical career ==
Chaffey studied at University of East London, receiving in 1991 a research-based degree comparing osteopathic and physiotherapeutic interventions in the mechanical discomforts of pregnancy. He qualified at the British School of Osteopathy (1988). He headed an osteopathic group practice beginning in 1991, working with a team of 11 osteopathic specialists. He attained leadership positions in the UK Osteopathy profession, being appointed as a Member of Council of UK Regulator, the General Osteopathic Council, in 2012. He is a member of the Education and Registration Standards Committee.

Chaffey has worked in osteopathic education since 1991 as a lecturer and clinic tutor. He is currently a Clinical Tutor at the European School of Osteopathy, lecturing on communication and compliance issues. He was Module Leader for Osteopathy for 2 years at Oxford Brookes University, and currently serves as an external examiner for that institution. He became an external examiner for Final Clinical Competence in 2001.
