= Andrea Seigel =

American novelist and screenwriter (born 1979)

- Born: October 28, 1979 (age 46); Anaheim, California, U.S.
- Education: Anaheim; Bennington College (MFA)
- Occupations: Novelist; screenwriter; ASMRtist
- Writing career
- Period: 2002–present
- Website: andreaseigel.com

Andrea Seigel (born October 28, 1979) is an American novelist and screenwriter. To date, she has published four novels. Seigel was born in Anaheim, California, and grew up in Irvine, California. She graduated from Woodbridge High School. She then attended Brown University, and received her MFA from Bennington College in Vermont.

In 2010, her third young adult novel, The Kid Table was optioned by producer Ivan Reitman for Paramount Pictures.

In March 2013, Seigel appeared on the public radio program This American Life. On the program she revealed that she has ASMR, a perceptual phenomenon that produces tingling in the scalp in response to soft or gentle sounds and motions.

In June 2013, production was completed on Laggies, a movie written by Seigel. The film was directed by Lynn Shelton and stars Keira Knightley, Chloë Grace Moretz, Ellie Kemper and Sam Rockwell. The film was released in 2014.

In May 2015, Andrea became the subject of the podcast, Mystery Show by Gimlet media. The podcast followed the discovery that Britney Spears was reading her little known book, To Feel Stuff.

== Novels ==
- Like the Red Panda (2004)
- To Feel Stuff (2006)
- The Kid Table (2010)
- Everybody Knows Your Name (2015) co-written with Brent Bradshaw

== Filmography ==
- Laggies (2014)
- Handsome: A Netflix Mystery Movie (2017)
- The Silent Twins (2022)
