= The Optimists of Nine Elms =

1973 British film by Anthony Simmons

The Optimists
- Theatrical Release Poster
- Directed by: Anthony Simmons
- Written by: Anthony Simmons; Tudor Gates
- Produced by: Adrian Gaye; Victor Lyndon
- Starring: Peter Sellers
- Cinematography: Larry Pizer
- Edited by: John Jympson
- Music by: Lionel Bart; George Martin
- Production companies: Sagittarius Productions; Cheetah Productions; West One Film Producers
- Distributed by: Scotia-Barber (United Kingdom); Paramount Pictures (United States)
- Release date: 18 October 1973
- Running time: 110 minutes
- Country: United Kingdom
- Language: English

The Optimists of Nine Elms, also known as The Optimists, is a 1973 British drama film starring Peter Sellers and directed by Anthony Simmons, who also wrote the 1964 novel upon which the film is based. The film is about an old street musician (played by Sellers) who strikes up a friendship with two children – Liz, played by Donna Mullane, and her younger brother Mark, played by John Chaffey. Neither of the child actors was featured in future films. A young Keith Chegwin also played a small role.

Mullane was recruited for her role by the film crew when they were scouting locations and saw her as she was walking home from school.

== Plot ==
Sam is a dignified, former music hall artist who now works with his elderly trained dog Bella, busking in the West End of London. He lives in a rundown goods yard alongside a derelict canal in Nine Elms. Two young children, Liz and Mark, stumble upon it whilst out walking. He chases them away, but despite his best efforts, they later follow him as he goes off to work pushing his dog and all his busking paraphernalia in an Edwardian pram. Liz and Mark live nearby with their parents, Chrissie and Bob, and baby brother James in a drab, cramped basement flat. Bob works at the local gasworks and the family are desperate to move to a new Council flat. When they're out of school, their mother has little time for them, and they find their own adventures together on the streets.

Begrudgingly, Sam develops a relationship with the children as they tag along. Having mentioned it in passing, he agrees to take them to visit the Hyde Park pet cemetery, where he anticipates Bella will be buried someday after an elaborate funeral, the next day on his way to the West End. They also discuss visiting the new flats. The following day, it becomes clear that Bella is increasingly frail and Sam is worried about her. At the new flats, he tells them how his wife died ten years previously and how his seven grown up children are now scattered all over the world. He has found human beings unreliable throughout his life and “only dogs can be depended upon”. Bella is his best friend and, although getting a new flat was all very well, getting a dog was more important. Between them, they conclude the family needs a dog and, having established the children would look after it properly, Sam agrees to help them get one.

The following afternoon, he takes them to Battersea Dogs Home where, posing as their grandfather, he helps them choose a dog. However, Sam is astounded and angry when the home tell him they can only take the dog if it is paid for. The children and Sam leave the home bitterly disappointed and, having admonished the children for telling lies as “he wasn’t their grandfather”, Sam tells them they will have to ask their parents for the money and leaves, humiliated. The children return home despondent and are further discouraged when their mum seems unsympathetic to the idea of getting a dog. The children resolve to try to save the money to get it anyway and make money doing odd jobs. When they next see Sam, he is crotchety, and Bella is very ill. Sam offers to pay them to baby-sit Bella while he is working and having haggled about the fee, they agree.

The following day they visit their dad at work to see if he will give them the balance to pay for their dog, but he tells them he needs to save everything he can if he is to have a hope of getting the flat. They return to Sam who, reluctant to concede that Bella's condition is terminal, agrees to give them the balance they need as an advance for more baby-sitting duties. Next day, they learn they have got the new flat and, together with Sam, collect their dog which they name Battersea. They return home later to be told they should not have bought the dog. They discover that the new flat is in Nine Elms, not the flats they had seen with Sam in Westminster, and that dogs are not allowed. The children run off to Sam's, where they find Sam drunk and in mourning for Bella. They try to give Battersea to Sam, but he rejects it and, when they talk of the majestic funeral for Bella, he laughs and tells them she will go in the dustcart. He leaves and, after tying Battersea to his table, the children take Bella's body, and at night sneak into the cemetery at Hyde Park and bury it there. They hide when their dad and Sam arrive outside the cemetery with Battersea, but fall asleep as the two talk into the night about life, death, dogs and children. When they awake the following morning Dad is overjoyed to see them and they leave Battersea with Sam.

== Cast ==
- Peter Sellers as Sam
- Donna Mullane as Liz
- John Chaffey as Mark
- David Daker as Bob Ellis
- Marjorie Yates as Chrissie Ellis
- Patricia Brake as Dogs Home Secretary
- Don Crown as Busker
- Michael Graham Cox as Park Keeper
- Bruce Purchase as Policeman
- Pat Ashton as Woman at Nursery
- Keith Chegwin as Georgie (uncredited)
- Hilary Pritchard as Laundry lady (uncredited)

== Novel and screenplay ==
Simmons is said to have planned the film around the time his two award-winning short films Sunday By the Sea (1953) and Bow Bells (1954) were released. Both films were set to Cockney music hall songs, lending a clear continuity between the works. Buster Keaton was to have played the lead role of Sam, however British financiers were not convinced of Keaton's box office potential and the project collapsed. The novel was first published in 1964.

== Critical reception ==
Variety wrote, "It all sounds like goo, and the film’s last half-hour verges perilously close. But even at its worst The Optimists is acceptable family fare, and for much of its first 80 minutes it engagingly achieves a sense of fantasy." while The New York Times described the film as "the sort of old-fashioned excursion into sentiment that ought to warm the hearts of parents in search of that elusive piece of merchandise that goes under the name of good family entertainment. Peter Sellers, with a wardrobe of old music hall clothes, a talented but aged dog named Bella and a pram he pushes around London, plays the lonely, idiosyncratic old busker. And commendably, he submerges himself sufficiently in the part to allow old Sam to have a life of his own."
