= Stefan Skarbek =

- Origin: Camden Town, United Kingdom
- Occupations: Songwriter, producer, singer, multi-instrumentalist
- Website: stefanskarbek.com

Stefan Skarbek is a British-born songwriter, producer, multi-instrumentalist and singer.

== Early life ==
He was raised in the Camden Town area of London. His father was Andrzej Skarbek, a prominent psychotherapist. His mother is Marjorie Wallace, the journalist and Chief Executive of the mental health charity SANE. His brother, Sacha Skarbek, is also a songwriter and music producer who has several credits including James Blunt and Jason Mraz.

== Career ==
After leaving performing arts school, Skarbek got involved with several British bands, including Jamiroquai, The Verve, Kahuna and Arkana. He regularly performed on national TV and toured.

Stefan became a resident of Mayfair Studios in Primrose Hill along with Matt Rowe and Guy Chambers where he worked on several records for artists like Amy Winehouse, the Spice Girls, Eliza Doolittle, Lily Allen, Charlotte O'Connor, Sugababes, Sophie Ellis-Bextor, Alex Parks, Seal, Pixie Lott and Estelle. He has achieved several platinum and gold records and awards. He also released several dance hits under various names and collaborated with acts such as Basement Jaxx. He worked closely with Amy Winehouse on and off until the time of her death in 2011.

In 2008, Skarbek formed the band Double0Zero with longtime friend Lalo Creme. They recorded their debut album We Are Not a Band, and released in the United States through Mirrorball Music in August 2010. Their music is featured on several computer games and film soundtracks, including Friends with Benefits starring Justin Timberlake and Mila Kunis.

Skarbek is a co-founder and the Creative Director of Mirrorball Entertainment in Los Angeles, California.
