= Anthony Simmons (writer) =

British writer and film director (1922–2016)

- Born: 16 December 1922; West Ham, Essex, England
- Died: 22 January 2016 (aged 93)
- Occupations: novelist, short story writer, screenwriter, director
- Writing career
- Pen name: Tony Simmons

Anthony Simmons (16 December 1922 – 22 January 2016) was a British writer and film director. He was associated with, though separate from, the Free Cinema movement; he said he was greatly influenced by Humphrey Jennings and by Michelangelo Antonioni’s movie Il Grido (1957).

== Early life ==
Simmons was born in West Ham, then in Essex, now part of the London Borough of Newham, the fourth of five children – three boys and two girls – to parents of Polish-Jewish extraction, Miriam (née Corb) and Joseph Simmons (originally Anzulowsky), from a family of market traders. He was named Isidore but adopted the forename Anthony in his teens. After attending West Ham Grammar School, Simmons gained a law degree from the London School of Economics, where his course was interrupted by wartime service.

== Career ==
Simmons asserted: "I wasn’t aiming to be a film director. I was a lawyer aiming to be a writer. But I felt that if I wrote films it was more immediate. It’s quicker. You haven’t got to spell out the words, you just make the image and tell the story."

His documentary Sunday by the Sea (1951) won the Grand Prix at the Venice Film Festival. Four in the Morning (1965), his second feature film as director, did not gain a circuit release although it won awards at several international film festivals, and a BAFTA for Judi Dench as the 'Most Promising Newcomer to Leading Film Roles'.

For several years Simmons worked in radio and made television commercials until his next feature The Optimists of Nine Elms (1973) starring Peter Sellers. His feature movie Black Joy (1977) was entered into the Cannes Film Festival. His television drama On Giant's Shoulders (1979) about Terry Wiles won an Emmy Award.

He also directed episodes of British television series including The Professionals, Supergran, Inspector Morse, Van Der Valk, A Touch of Frost and C.A.T.S. Eyes.

== Personal life ==
Simmons married twice. With his first wife, Sheila Phillips, he had three sons, Jonathan, Daniel and Mathew; the couple divorced. He is survived by his second wife, Maria St Clare, whom he married in 1981, and their three sons, Luke, Noah and Micah.

== Filmography ==
- Sunday by the Sea – documentary short – director/writer (1951)
- Bow Bells – documentary short – director/writer (1953)
- Passing Stranger – feature – co-writer (1954)
- Time Without Pity – feature – producer (1957)
- Your Money or Your Wife – feature – director (1960)
- Four in the Morning – feature – director/writer (1965)
- The Optimists of Nine Elms – feature – director/co-writer (1973), based on his novel The Optimists of Nine Elms
- Black Joy – feature – director/co-writer (1977)
- Green Ice – feature – co-writer (1981)
- Little Sweetheart – feature – director/writer (1989)

== Books written ==
- Simmons, Anthony (1992). A little Space for Issie Brown. Oxford University Press. ISBN 0-19-271652-2.
- Simmons, Anthony (1965). The Optimists of Nine Elms. Knopf Books for Young Readers. ISBN 0-19-271652-2.
