= Amy Sedaris =

American actress, comedian, and writer (born 1961)

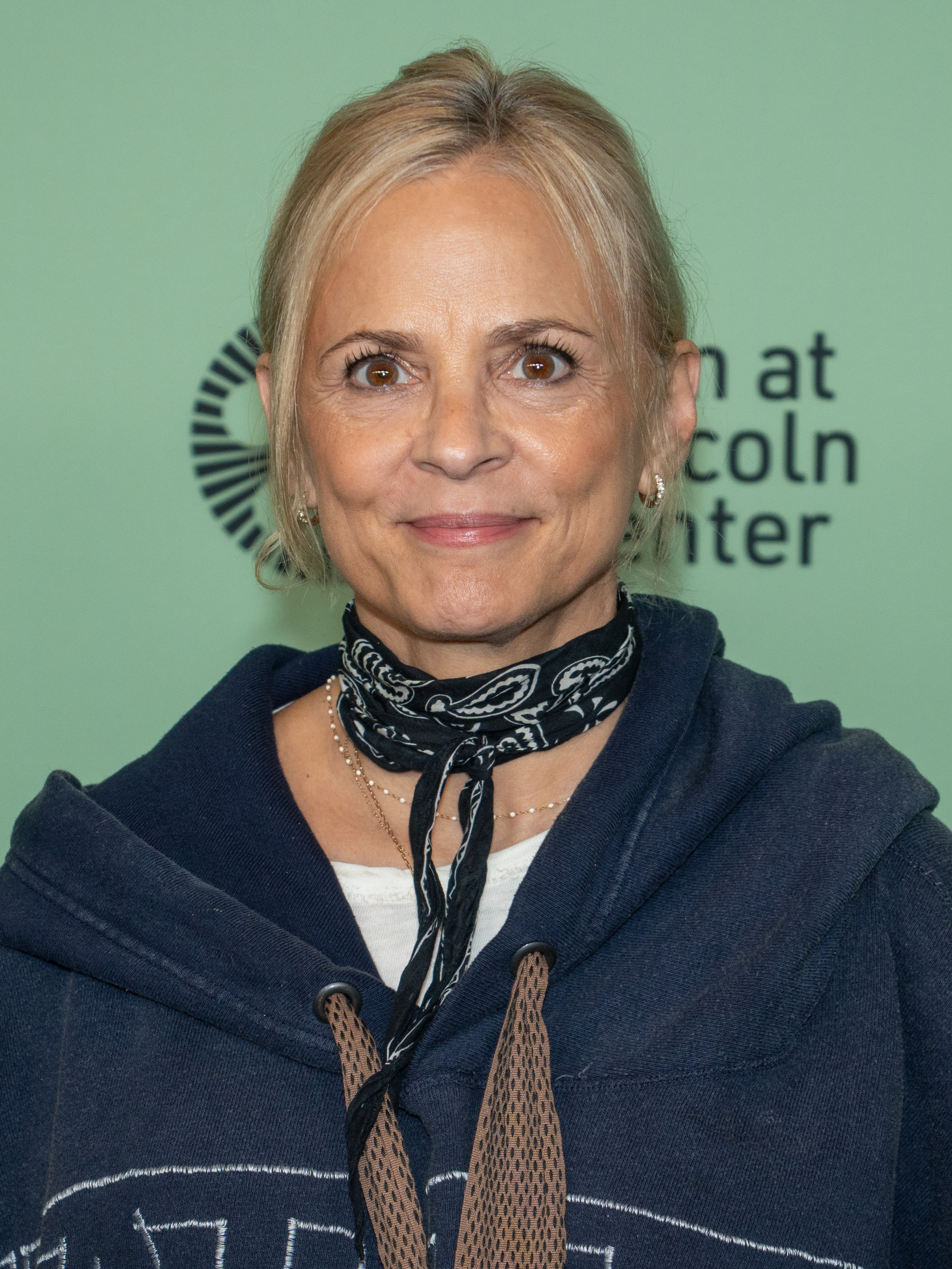
- Sedaris in 2025
- Born: Amy Louise Sedaris; March 29, 1961 (age 65)
- Occupations: Actress; comedian; writer
- Years active: 1980s–present
- Partner: Paul Dinello (1987–1995)
- Relatives: David Sedaris (brother)

Amy Louise Sedaris (/sɪˈdɛərɪs/; born March 29, 1961) is an American actress, comedian, and writer. She played Jerri Blank in the Comedy Central comedy series Strangers with Candy (1999–2000) and the prequel film Strangers with Candy (2005), which she also wrote.

Sedaris appeared as Hurshe Heartshe in the Adult Swim comedy series The Heart, She Holler (2013–2014), as Princess Carolyn in the Netflix animated comedy-drama series BoJack Horseman (2014–2020), and as Mimi Kanasis in the Netflix sitcom Unbreakable Kimmy Schmidt (2015–2020). She received further critical acclaim as the creator and star of the TruTV surreal comedy series At Home with Amy Sedaris (2017–2020) which earned her two nominations for the Primetime Emmy Award for Outstanding Variety Sketch Series. She appeared in both The Mandalorian (2019–2023) and The Book of Boba Fett (2022) as Peli Motto.

Sedaris has appeared in various films, including Maid in Manhattan (2002), Elf (2003), Bewitched (2005), Chicken Little (2005), Shrek the Third (2007), Jennifer's Body (2009), Puss in Boots (2011), Chef (2014), Ghost Team (2016), Handsome (2017), and voiced roles such as The Lion King (2019), The Boss Baby: Family Business (2021), and Smurfs (2025).

== Early life ==
Amy Sedaris was born on March 29, 1961, the fourth of six children in a Greek Orthodox family. Her parents were Sharon Elizabeth (née Leonard), a homemaker, and Louis Harry "Lou" Sedaris, an IBM engineer. Her Greek Orthodox father was born in Cortland, New York to immigrants from Apidea in Greece, and her Protestant mother was Anglo-American from Binghamton, New York. Her paternal grandmother owned a shoe shining store in New York.

When she was four, her family moved to Raleigh, North Carolina, where she grew up with her five siblings: Lisa, David, Gretchen, Tiffany, and Paul. She recalled feeling out of place in that new environment, as her family was not southern and followed Greek traditions. As a child, Sedaris liked playing dress-up and putting on plays for her family. In her brother David's book Me Talk Pretty One Day, he noted that she would often assume characters to play pranks on her family. As a teenager, Sedaris' first job was at the local Winn-Dixie supermarket where she would make fake announcements over the loudspeaker; for a while, she was determined to work at the local women's prison in Raleigh. She attended Jesse O. Sanderson High School and was a Girl Scout until she graduated.

At the age of 20, she and her mother worked together making and selling spanakopita. During that time, she was dating a man from Greece, and one evening after coming home from cooking, she found him unconscious on the kitchen floor. He had a brain aneurysm, and Sedaris spent the next three years caring for him. When they eventually broke up, Sedaris moved to Chicago with her brother David, and took classes at Second City and Annoyance Theatre. There she also worked as a waitress at Zanies Comedy Club.

== Career ==
=== Television ===
In the late 1980s, she was hired to perform with Second City's touring company. It was there she met Paul Dinello and Stephen Colbert, with whom she often collaborated later in her career. She and Dinello did not get along with Colbert at first, but they became close friends while touring together, discovering that they shared a similar comic sensibility. Sedaris left Second City in 1993, and moved to New York City. Sedaris's first major foray into television began in 1995 on the Comedy Central sketch series Exit 57, alongside Colbert and Dinello. For her performance she was nominated for the 17th CableACE Award for Best Comedy Actress and the series was nominated for Best Comedy Series. It ran for a total of two seasons.

Beginning in 1999 Sedaris played Jerri Blank, a middle-aged woman who goes back to high school in the Comedy Central comedy series Strangers with Candy. The series, which she co-wrote with Dinello and Colbert, was based on Sedaris's impression of 1970s-era motivational speaker Florrie Fisher. The show ran for three seasons. In 2005, a film adaptation was released, acting as a prequel to the series.

Sedaris went on to make numerous guest appearances on television programs, including Just Shoot Me! (2001), Sex and the City (2002–2003), Monk (2002–2003), Wonder Showzen (2005), My Name Is Earl (2006), Sesame Street (2006), Rescue Me (2007), The Closer (2009), The New Adventures of Old Christine (2009), The Middle (2010), Raising Hope (2011–2014), and The Good Wife (2012). She also hosted the series Film Fanatic on Trio.

Sedaris's talk show appearances include Late Show with David Letterman, The Late Show with Stephen Colbert, Late Night with Conan O'Brien, Jimmy Kimmel Live!, The Late Late Show with Craig Ferguson, The Daily Show, The Colbert Report, Late Night with Jimmy Fallon, and WTF with Marc Maron. During an appearance on Chelsea Lately, she gave host Chelsea Handler a presentation on vaginal hygiene using a plush vagina created by fashion designer Todd Oldham.

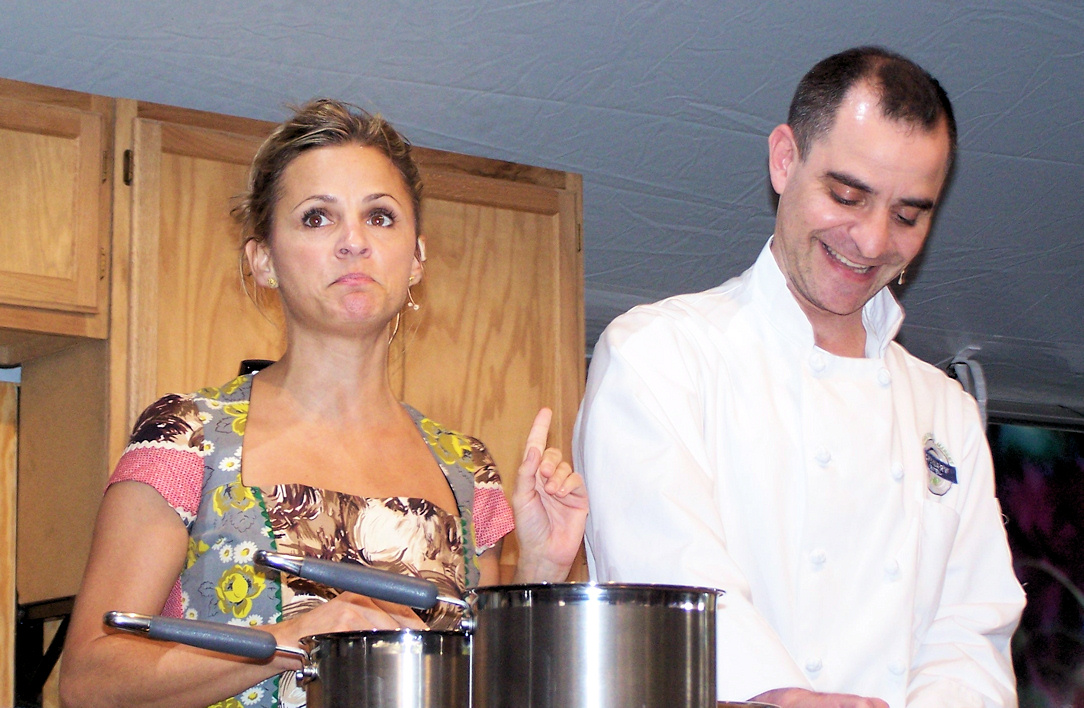
Sedaris and David Rakoff at the 2006 Texas Book Festival

In 2008, Sedaris starred as Principal Abby Hofman in the Nickelodeon television film Gym Teacher: The Movie, which was directed by her Strangers with Candy co-star and frequent collaborator Paul Dinello.

In early 2010, she had a supporting character in the Canadian comedy series The Drunk and On Drugs Happy Fun Time Hour. Later in 2010 she appeared alongside Paul Dinello in the episode "Mummified Hand", of the Discovery/Science Channel documentary series Oddities.

In 2011, she appeared in a series of commercials for Downy (Lenor UK) Unstoppables, a fabric softener product. Grey Global Group designed the commercials as "kicking the old 'mom' image with spots featuring 'laundry expert' (and accomplished lifestyle guru) Amy Sedaris".

In 2013, she replaced Kristen Schaal as the sex-crazed Hurshe Heartshe, in the second season of the Adult Swim comedy series The Heart, She Holler. She also appeared in the third and final season. That same year, Sedaris appeared in a major recurring role in the Amazon Prime Video political satire series Alpha House, which was written by Doonesbury creator Garry Trudeau. Sedaris played Louise Laffer, the Mormon wife of Nevada Senator Louis Laffer who lives with three other Republican senators in a town house on Capitol Hill.

Sedaris later had a recurring role as Pam in the Comedy Central sitcom Broad City (2014–2019), as Rita in the Hulu dark comedy series Difficult People (2015–2017). From 2015 to 2020, she portrayed Mimi Kanasis in the Netflix comedy series Unbreakable Kimmy Schmidt, for which she earned a nomination for the Gold Derby Award for Best Comedy Guest Actress.

In 2016, Sedaris appeared in the tragicomedy series Horace and Pete, as a character named Mara looking for a job at Horace and Pete's. She also co-starred with Chris Elliott in the Sony Crackle family comedy series Thanksgiving.

In 2017, Sedaris created the TruTV surreal comedy series At Home with Amy Sedaris, which she also wrote and executive produced. The series focused on the comedian's love of entertaining, crafts, and cooking. She played numerous characters, including herself, Patty Hogg, Ronnie Vino, and Nutmeg. The series was met with critical acclaim upon its premiere, garnering two consecutive nominations for the Primetime Emmy Award for Outstanding Variety Sketch Series, and ran for three seasons.

Sedaris had a starring role as Janice Delongpre, a dispatch officer, in the CBS All Access comedy series No Activity from 2017 to 2019. She had guest-starring roles as Cathy in the HBO comedy-drama series Divorce (2018).

=== Voice ===
Sedaris has voiced commercials for the discount hair salon chain Supercuts and was WordGirl character Miss Davis for two seasons. She also voiced the Bandit Princess in Adventure Time. She narrated the PBS special Make 'Em Laugh: The Funny Business of America, a six-hour documentary on comedians and comedy in American history.

In film, Sedaris voiced Foxy Loxy in the science fiction comedy Chicken Little (2005), Cinderella in the animated fantasy comedy Shrek the Third (2007), Gravity in the family comedy Space Buddies (2009), Jill in the adventure comedy Puss in Boots (2011), Betty in the fantasy comedy Super Buddies (2013), and Aunt Ida in the English dub of the Academy Award-nominated comedy drama My Life as a Courgette (2016).

She voiced the role of Audrey Temple in two seasons of the podcast Homecoming (2016–2017). The series was later adapted into a series of the same name, starring Julia Roberts. Sedaris' character was portrayed in the series by Hong Chau.

Sedaris voiced characters in numerous animated series. From 2014 to 2020, she provided the voice for Princess Carolyn in the Netflix adult animated comedy series BoJack Horseman, a role which some critics consider her best work.

She also voiced various characters in the Fox adult comedy series American Dad! (2009–2012), Ma Angler in the Nickelodeon children's comedy series SpongeBob SquarePants (2011–2019), Lydia / Mina Loveberry in the Disney Channel action fantasy series Star vs. the Forces of Evil (2016–2019), the Zircons in the Cartoon Network coming-of-age series Steven Universe (2017), and Samantha in the Netflix adult comedy series F is for Family (2020).

In 2019, Sedaris voiced a Guinea Fowl in the musical drama film The Lion King (2019), which is a photorealistic animated remake of Disney's 1994 film of the same name.

In 2022, Sedaris voiced Suzanne in Meet Cute's holiday rom-com audio series, Christmasuzannukkah. "I've always loved holiday movies. They're like comfort food and they never get old," said Sedaris. "Christmasuzannukkah really brings together the joy, drama and heart of the season, and it was so much fun to be able to do this in a podcast form."

=== Film ===
Throughout her career, Sedaris had supporting roles in a number of feature films. She appeared in the romantic comedy Maid in Manhattan (2002), the musical comedy School of Rock (2003), the Christmas comedy Elf (2003), and the fantasy comedy Bewitched (2005).

Her first leading film role came in the 2005 film adaptation Strangers with Candy, which she also co-wrote. She followed this with supporting roles in the comedy-drama film Full Grown Men (2006), the drama film Snow Angels (2007), and the ensemble comedy film Old Dogs (2009).

Sedaris had a large role in the comedy film The Best and the Brightest, which was released in 2010. She went on to star in the horror comedy film Jennifer's Body (2009), the comedy-drama film Chef (2014), the supernatural comedy film Ghost Team (2016), the mystery comedy film Handsome (2017), and the comedy film Save Yourselves! (2020). She also played the heart surgeon Dr. Ladenheim in Clerks III (2022) and also plays a sentient book, Jaunty, in Smurfs (2025). Sedaris will next reunite with Dinello for a remake of Roger Corman's science fiction film The Wasp Woman (1959). Dinello is set to write and direct the film with Sedaris starring.

=== Writing ===
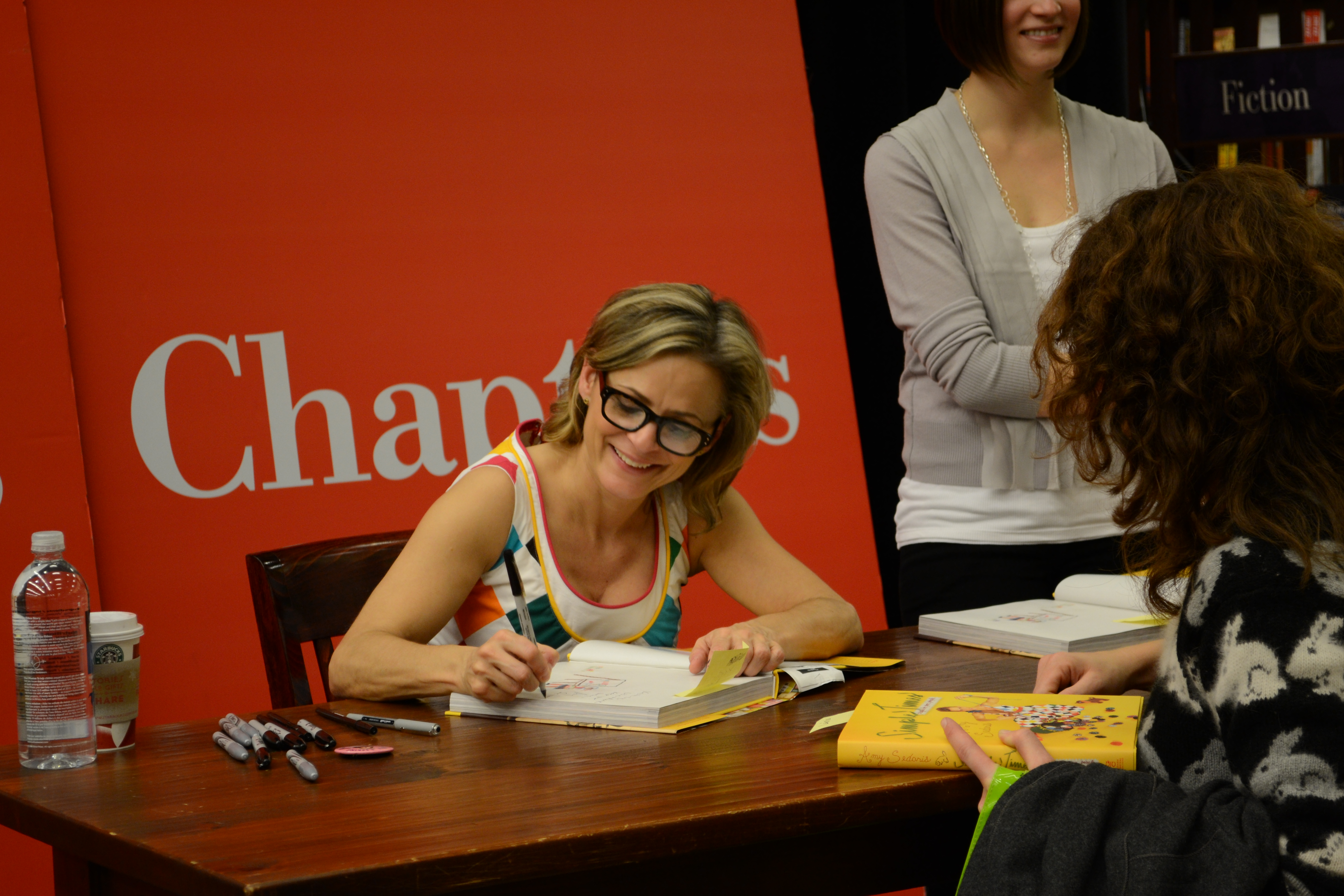
Sedaris at a book signing for Simple Times: Crafts for Poor People in 2010

In 2003, Sedaris co-authored the text-and-picture novel Wigfield alongside collaborators Paul Dinello and Stephen Colbert.

Sedaris has contributed several articles for The Believer magazine since 2005. In a 2006 interview with the magazine, she answered part of a Q&A section with, "TURN-OFFS: The beach, having to pay for things, racist people, Orientals."

In 2006, Sedaris released I Like You: Hospitality Under the Influence, a guide to entertaining, which stayed on the New York Times bestseller list for more than 12 weeks. In 2007, she was working with Dinello on a show for HBO, loosely based on the book, but the project never came to fruition.

In 2010, she released the crafting book Simple Times: Crafts for Poor People!. While promoting her book on Late Night with David Letterman in October 2010, she demonstrated how the cover can easily be made into a hat.

=== Theater ===
Amy has co-written several plays with her brother David, credited only as "The Talent Family": Stump the Host (1993), Stitches (1994), One Woman Shoe (1995), Incident at Cobblers Knob (1997), and The Little Frieda Mysteries (1997). The pair's The Book of Liz (2002) focused on cheese balls as a metaphor for "the cliches we all live by", according to Ben Brantley.

She played a role as the Stage Manager in Paul Rudnick's play The Most Fabulous Story Ever Told (1998) and as Froggy in Douglas Carter Beane's play The Country Club (1998), the latter of which earned her a nomination for the Drama Desk Award for Outstanding Featured Actress in a Play. She had a role in David Lindsay-Abaire's play Wonder of the World and the stage adaptation of her book Wigfield (2003), alongside Paul Dinello and Stephen Colbert.

=== Other work ===
In support of People for the Ethical Treatment of Animals (PETA)'s anti-fur campaign, Sedaris appeared as her Strangers with Candy character in an ad that reads, "When you wear fur, people laugh at you, not with you."

In 2007, Sedaris was featured in Dolly Parton's first mainstream country music video in fourteen years, "Better Get to Livin'".

She was the emcee for Microsoft's 2010 annual employee meeting in Seattle on September 28, 2010.

== Personal life ==
Sedaris has run a cupcake and cheeseball business, Dusty Food Cupcakes, out of her home kitchen. Dusty was the name of her pet rabbit. She lives in Greenwich Village, Manhattan, New York City.

Sedaris was in an eight-year relationship with her comedy partner Paul Dinello. After their breakup, they have remained close friends, with Sedaris being godmother to his two children. Sedaris has said in several interviews that she has never desired to marry or have children.

== Filmography ==
=== Film ===
Year	Title	Role	Notes
1997	Bad Bosses Go to Hell	Trendy Boss	
1997	Commandments	Scholar	
1998	Wheels of Fury	Pepper Mills	Short film
1998	Six Days, Seven Nights	Robin's Secretary	
2001	Jump Tomorrow	Other Student in Class	
2002	Maid in Manhattan	Rachel Hoffberg	
2003	School of Rock	Mrs. Haynish	
2003	Elf	Deb	
2004	Neurotica	Renee	
2004	My Baby's Daddy	Annabelle	
2005	Strangers with Candy	Jerri Blank	Also writer
2005	Bewitched	Gladys Kravitz	
2005	Romance & Cigarettes	Frances	
2005	Stay	Toni	
2005	Chicken Little	Foxy Loxy (voice)	
2006	Full Grown Men	Trina	
2006	I Want Someone to Eat Cheese With	Ms. Clark	
2007	Snow Angels	Barb Petite	
2007	Dedication	Cassidy's Mom	
2007	Shrek the Third	Cinderella (voice)	
2007	Puberty: The Movie	Paulie the Penis (voice)	
2009	Space Buddies	Gravity (voice)	Direct-to-video
2009	Dance Flick	Ms. Cameltoé	
2009	Jennifer's Body	Toni Lesnicki	
2009	Tanner Hall	Mrs. Middlewood	
2009	Old Dogs	Condo Woman	
2010	Beware the Gonzo	Diane Gilman	
2010	The Best and the Brightest	Sue Lemon	
2011	Puss in Boots	Jill (voice)	
2013	Super Buddies	Betty (voice)	Direct-to-video
2014	Ping Pong Summer	Aunt Peggy	
2014	Chef	Jen	
2014	Hits	Crystal	
2014	Goodbye to All That	Holly	
2016	My Life as a Courgette	Aunt Ida (voice)	English dub
2016	Ghost Team	Victoria	
2017	The Parable of the Disappearing Recliner	Donna	Short film
2017	Handsome	Lieutenant Tucker	
2017	Observatory Blues	Fernando's Wife	Short film
2019	The Lion King	Guineafowl (voice)	
2020	Save Yourselves!	Mrs. Wyndham (voice)	
2021	The Boss Baby: Family Business	Tina Templeton (voice)	
2022	Clerks III	Doctor Ladenheim	
2023	Theater Camp	Joan Rubinsky	
2023	Somebody I Used to Know	Deedee	
2023	Ghosted	Mrs. Turner	
2024	No Time to Spy: A Loud House Movie	Fifi Dufus (voice)	
2025	Smurfs	Jaunty (voice)	
2025	Is This Thing On?	Kemp	
2026	The Pout-Pout Fish	The Pink Dolphins (voice)	
2026	Office Romance	Julie Schatz	
TBA	Peaked	TBA	Filming
TBA	Dedicated to Morris Burke	TBA	Filming
TBA	Stephanie, Bride to Be	TBA	Filming

=== Television ===
Year	Title	Role	Notes
1991	Big Deals	Topaz Radulavitch	Television film
1995–1996	Exit 57	Various	Main role; 12 episodes Also creator and writer
1999–2000	Strangers with Candy	Geraldine Antonia "Jerri" Blank	Main role; 31 episodes Also creator and writer
2001	Fling	The Receptionist	2 episodes
2001	Just Shoot Me!	Betsy Frayne	2 episodes
2001–2015	Late Show with David Letterman	Herself	31 episodes
2002–2003	Sex and the City	Courtney Masterson	4 episodes
2002–2003	Monk	Gail Fleming	2 episodes
2003	Untitled New York Pilot	Connie	Unsold pilot
2004	Ed	Kate McCormick	2 episodes
2004	Cracking Up	Marla	Episode: "Prom Night"
2004	The Wrong Coast	Various voices	Unknown episodes
2004	Law & Order: Special Victims Unit	Charlie Donato	Episode: "Head"
2005	Wonder Showzen	Miss Amy	Episode: "History"
2006	Sesame Street	Snow White	Episode: "Snow White's Meltdown"
2006	My Name Is Earl	Judy	Episode: "Larceny of a Kitty Kat"
2006, 2014	The Colbert Report	Klanswoman, Abraxxia (voice)	2 episodes
2007	Andy Barker, P.I.	Rita Spaulding	Episode: "The Lady Varnishes"
2007	Rescue Me	Beth	2 episodes
2008	Yo Gabba Gabba!	Tooth Fairy	Episode: "Teeth"
2008	Gym Teacher: The Movie	Principal Hoffman	Television film
2009	The Closer	Claire Howard	2 episodes
2009	The New Adventures of Old Christine	Frances "Frankenstein" Stein	Episode: "Old Christine Meets Young Frankenstein"
2009–2023	American Dad!	Roslyn Jenkins, Dr. Lizzy, Dr. Meg Penner (voice)	4 episodes
2010	The Middle	Abby Michaels	Episode: "The Fun House"
2010	The Problem Solverz	Thaz (voice)	Episode: "Neon Gnome"
2010	Oddities	Herself	Episode: "Mummified Hand"
2010–2012	WordGirl	Miss Jade Davis, Rhyme, Various voices	3 episodes
2011	Royal Pains	Nan	Episode: "Mulligian"
2011	The Drunk and On Drugs Happy Fun Time Hour	Katherine "K-Money" Money	Main role; 6 episodes
2011	Hot In Cleveland	Heather Shaw	2 episodes
2011–2014	Raising Hope	Delilah	3 episodes
2011, 2019	SpongeBob SquarePants	Ma Angler (voice)	2 episodes
2011–2025	Bob's Burgers	Samantha, Inga (voice)	3 episodes
2012	The Good Wife	Stacie Hall	3 episodes
2012	Necessary Roughness	Dr. Jane Crosetti	Episode: "What's Eating You?"
2012	30 Rock	Visor Lady	Episode: "Unwindulax"
2013	F to 7th	Kate	Episode: "Family"
2013	Doc McStuffins	Dress-Up Daisy (voice)	2 episodes
2013	Monsters vs. Aliens	Dr. Belle Cutter (voice)	Episode: "The Mystery of Dr. Cutter"
2013–2014	The Heart, She Holler	Hurshe Heartshe	Main role; 22 episodes
2013–2014	Alpha House	Louise Laffer	14 episodes
2014	Lil Bub's Special Special	Herself	Television special
2014	Mr. Pickles	Sally (voice)	Episode: "Dead Man's Curve"
2014	Seriously Distracted	JD	3 episodes
2014	Dead Boss	Mary	Unsold pilot
2014, 2019	Broad City	Pam	2 episodes
2014–2020	BoJack Horseman	Princess Carolyn, additional voices	Main role; 61 episodes
2015	Clarence	Ms. Donna-Joe Judley, Woman (voice)	Episode: "Hoofin' It"
2015	Kevin from Work	Julia	4 episodes
2015	Regular Show	Mrs. Claire Kessler, Jayla (voice)	Episode: "The Eileen Plan"
2015–2017	Difficult People	Rita	3 episodes
2015–2020	Unbreakable Kimmy Schmidt	Mimi Kanasis	14 episodes
2016	The 7D	Nocturna (voice)	Episode: "In Yer Dreams Pal"
2016	Horace and Pete	Mara	Episode: "Episode 10"
2016	Adventure Time	Bandit Princess (voice)	Episode: "I Am a Sword"
2016	Odd Mom Out	Elna	Episode: "Crushed"
2016	Thanksgiving	Kathy Morgan	Main role; 8 episodes
2016	RuPaul's Drag Race	Herself	Episode: "RuPaul Book Ball"
2016–2019	Star vs. the Forces of Evil	Lydia, Mina Loveberry (voice)	13 episodes
2017	Steven Universe	Zircons (voice)	Episode: "The Trial"
2017	Sas & Jake	Jake's Mom	Unsold pilot
2017–2021	No Activity	Janice Delongpre	Main role; 21 episodes
2017–2025	Match Game	Herself	5 episodes
2017–2020	At Home with Amy Sedaris	Herself / Various	Main role; 30 episodes Also creator, writer, and executive producer
2018	Jimmy Kimmel Live!	Subway Rider	Episode: "October 19, 2018"
2018	Divorce	Cathy	2 episodes
2019	Twelve Forever	Sadmantha (voice)	Episode: "Reggie's Dad Forever"
2019	Pinky Malinky	Helga Hilltop (voice)	Episode: "Weiner"
2019	You're Not a Monster	Medusa (voice)	2 episodes
2019–2023	The Mandalorian	Peli Motto	4 episodes
2020	The National Lampoon Radio Hour	Various (voice)	Episode: "Björk Easter"
2020	Bubble Guppies	The Witch/The Furry Godmother (voice)	Episode: "A Furry Tale!"
2020	Unbreakable Kimmy Schmidt: Kimmy vs the Reverend	Mimi Kanasis	Television film
2020	Rise of the Teenage Mutant Ninja Turtles	Vivian Slopworth (voice)	Episode: "Mystery Meat"
2020	F is for Family	Samantha (voice)	5 episodes
2020	DuckTales	Pepper (voice)	3 episodes
2021	Robot Chicken	Betty Cooper, Mary Andrews (voice)	Episode: "The Bleepin' Robot Chicken Archie Comics Special"
2021	Betty	Helpful Lady	Episode: "Sweet Tooth"
2022	The Book of Boba Fett	Peli Motto	2 episodes
2022	Dicktown	Giovanna (voice)	5 episodes
2022	Girls5eva	Kris Dutkowsky	Episode: "Can't Wait 2 Wait"
2022	Harley Quinn	Debbie (voice)	Episode: "Joker: The Killing Vote"
2022	Ziwe	Shelby	Episode: "Tech"
2023	Blaze and the Monster Machines	Yucky Ducky (voice)	Episode: "The Yucky Ducky"
2023	Big City Greens	Bonnie Spark (voice)	Episode: "Jingled"
2024	Life & Beth	Flora	2 episodes
2024	Fantasmas	Acting Coach	Episode: "The Little Ones"
2024	Grimsburg	Lil' Betsy (voice)	Episode: "The Big Trouble with Lil' Betsy"
2024	Mulligan	Additional voice	2 episodes
2024	The Simpsons	Maggie Simpson (voice)	Episode: "Bart's Birthday", overdubbed lines from Nancy Cartwright
2024	Frasier	Dr. Stathos	Episode: "The Dedication"
2024	Doctor Odyssey	Bethany Welles	Episode: "Wellness Week"
2024–2025	The Tiny Chef Show	Announcer (voice)	4 episodes
2025	Hamster & Gretel	Juni (voice)	Episode: "Gran Slam/The Art of Deception"
2025	Love, Death & Robots	Security Camera (voice)	Episode: "Smart Appliances, Stupid Owners"
2025	Digman!	Senator Stacy Potts (voice)	2 episodes
2025	Elsbeth	Laurel Hammond-Muntz	Episode: "Yes, And..."
2025	Super Duper Bunny League	Hoot'n Annie (voice)	Episode: "Hoot'n Annie"
2026	Wylde Pak	The Keeper (voice)	Episode: "Halmoni Learns the Internet/The Library"
2026	Kevin	Brandi (voice)	8 episodes
2027	Oswald	Taylor's mother	Post-production

=== Video games ===
Year	Title	Voice role	Notes
2005	Chicken Little	Foxy Loxy	
2023	What the Car?	Herself	Special level: "Amy Sedaris Can't Drive"

=== Music video ===
Year	Title	Artist	Role	Ref.
2007	"Better Get to Livin'"	Dolly Parton	Hawker, Fortune Teller	

=== Podcast ===
Year	Title	Voice role
2016–2017	Homecoming	Audrey Temple
2021	SmartLess	Herself
2022	Christmasuzannukkah	Suzanne

== Theatre ==
Year	Title	Role	Venue	Ref.
1993	Stump the Host	Performer	La MaMa Experimental Theatre	
1994	Stitches	Performer	La MaMa Experimental Theatre	
1995	One Woman Shoe	Performer	La MaMa Experimental Theatre	
1997	Incident at Cobblers Knob	Performer	La MaMa Experimental Theatre	
1997	The Little Frieda Mysteries	Performer	La MaMa Experimental Theatre	
1998	The Country Club	Froggy	Greenwich House Theater	
1998	The Most Fabulous Story Ever Told	Stage Manager	New York Theatre Workshop	
2001	Wonder of the World	Barbara / Janie	Manhattan Theatre Club	
2002	The Book of Liz	Performer	La MaMa Experimental Theatre	
2003	Wigfield	Performer	Lucille Lortel Theatre	
2024	Gutenberg! The Musical!	Producer	James Earl Jones Theatre	

== Bibliography ==
- Sedaris, Stephen Colbert, Paul Dinello. Wigfield: The Can-Do Town That Just May Not (Hyperion, May 19, 2004) ISBN 0-7868-8696-X
- I Like You: Hospitality Under the Influence (Warner Books, October 16, 2006) ISBN 0-446-57884-3
- Sedaris and Dinello. Simple Times: Crafts for Poor People (Grand Central Publishing, November 2, 2010) ISBN 0-446-55704-8

== Awards and nominations ==
Year	Association	Category	Work	Result	Ref.
1995	CableACE Awards	Best Actress in a Comedy Series	Exit 57	Nominated	
1995	CableACE Awards	Best Comedy Series	Exit 57	Nominated	
2000	Drama Desk Awards	Outstanding Featured Actress in a Play	The Country Club	Nominated	
2002	Lucille Lortel Awards	Outstanding Featured Actress	Wonder of the World	Nominated	
2016	Gold Derby Awards	Best Comedy Guest Actress	Unbreakable Kimmy Schmidt	Nominated	
2018	Primetime Emmy Awards	Outstanding Variety Sketch Series	At Home with Amy Sedaris	Nominated	
2019	Writers Guild of America Awards	Best Comedy / Variety Sketch Series	At Home with Amy Sedaris	Nominated	
2019	Primetime Emmy Awards	Outstanding Variety Sketch Series	At Home with Amy Sedaris	Nominated	
2020	Writers Guild of America Awards	Best Comedy / Variety Sketch Series	At Home with Amy Sedaris	Nominated	
2021	Writers Guild of America Awards	Best Comedy / Variety Sketch Series	At Home with Amy Sedaris	Won	
