= Andrzej Skarbek =

Polish psychologist (1925–2011)

- Born: Andrzej Karol Skarbek; 10 January 1925; Lwów, Poland
- Died: 16 November 2011 (aged 86)

Andrzej Karol Skarbek (10 January 1925 – 16 November 2011), also known as Andrew Skarbek, was a Polish psychotherapist who worked in Britain and became a pioneer "who helped to develop psychotherapy services in the NHS" (National Health Service).

== Early life ==
Skarbek was born at his family's estate in Lwów (now Lviv in Ukraine). His father was Stanisław Skarbek, a cavalry officer in the Polish Lancers. His mother was Zofia Czecz. He had a brother, Jan. In 1939, the family was forced to flee west from the invading Soviets. By war's end, Skarbek arrived in Britain.

His cousin was Krystyna Skarbek, who worked for British secret services (the Special Operations Executive) during the Second World War. Andrzej identified her body when she was stabbed to death in a Kensington hotel, where she then lived, on 15 June 1952.

== Career ==
Skarbek learned English on his arrival in Britain and entered St Mary's Hospital, London, qualifying as a doctor in 1954. He eventually met psychoanalyst Donald Winnicott and decided to specialise in psychiatry. He started to be known as Andrew Skarbek and in 1969 became clinical director of the London Clinic of Psychotherapy.

He later worked at University College Hospital, King George Hospital, Ilford, and in 1977 he became consultant psychotherapist at Runwell, Rochford and Basildon Hospitals. There he developed a psychodynamic psychotherapy service.

== Family ==
In 1952, Skarbek married Shelagh de Fane Edge Morgan. They had four children. They divorced, and in 1974 Skarbek married journalist and writer Marjorie Wallace. Wallace went on to found the mental health charity, SANE. Their two sons, Stefan and Sacha, are music producers.
