= Marjorie Wallace (charity executive) =

British journalist (born 1943)

Marjorie Wallace CBE
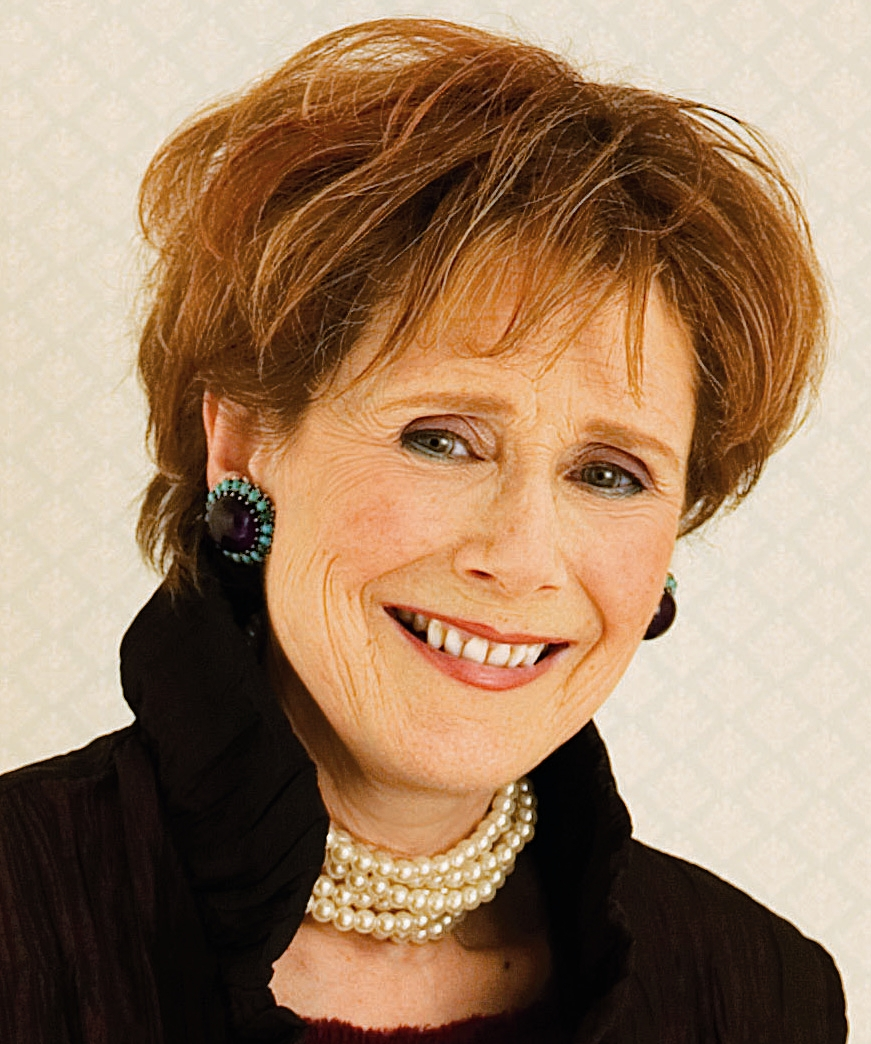
- Wallace in the 2000s
- Born: Marjorie Shiona Wallace; 10 January 1943 (age 83); Nairobi, British Kenya
- Education: University College London
- Occupation: SANE Chief Executive
- Spouse(s): Andrzej Skarbek (1974–2011); John Mills (2021–2025, his death)
- Partner: Tom Margerison

Marjorie Shiona Wallace CBE (born January 1943) is a British investigative journalist, author, and broadcaster. She is the founder and chief executive of the mental health charity SANE.

== Early life and education ==
Wallace was born in Nairobi, British Kenya, where her father was a civil engineer mapping the railways. Her mother was a classical pianist.

After studying music she graduated with a degree in psychology and philosophy from University College London.

== Career ==
=== Journalism ===
==== Early career ====
After graduating Wallace worked as a trainee producer for The Frost Programme with David Frost. She then became a producer of religious programmes and a current affairs reporter for London Weekend Television.

She later joined the BBC as a reporter and film director for the news and current affairs programme Nationwide, including covering stories about homeless people and making the first film inside an IRA training camp.

==== The Sunday Times ====
In 1972 Harold Evans, then editor of The Sunday Times, recruited Wallace into the Insight Team of the newspaper to work on the thalidomide scandal. She was tasked with tracking down as many of the cases where children had been born with deformities caused by the drug as possible.

Wallace interviewed over 140 families affected by thalidomide, publishing weekly stories in the newspaper. One of the cases was Terry Wiles, a child born with severe physical disabilities who had been adopted by Hazel and Len Wiles. The article is credited with helping to persuade Distillers, the company that distributed and marketed the drugs, to offer compensation to victims of the scandal.

Wallace later turned Wiles's story into a book and a screenplay, On Giant's Shoulders, for a BBC television film broadcast in 1979 starring Judi Dench. The drama won an International Emmy Award in 1980 and was also nominated for a BAFTA. The Sunday Times expose of thalidomide led to victims being awarded over £28 million in compensation.

In 1976 Wallace reported on the Dioxin disaster in Seveso in northern Italy, which led to the publication of The Superpoison.

In 1986 she wrote a series of campaigning articles in The Times on schizophrenia and other severe mental illness. The articles were published under the title The Forgotten Illness. They focused on misconceptions about mental illness, the anguish and neglect of sufferers and families, and the failures of the community care policy. The response to the articles was the largest The Times had ever received on a home news subject.

=== SANE & mental health ===
In 1986, as a result of the scale of the public response to The Forgotten Illness articles, Marjorie Wallace founded SANE. The charity initially focused on the most severe mental illnesses, but it later expanded its remit to all mental health.

Following the launch of the charity, Wallace recruited support for it from key figures in medicine, science, business, industry and the media, including Prince Charles as its first patron. Minette Marrin in The Sunday Times wrote of Wallace: “She stands firmly and consciously in the tradition of 19th-century social reformers like Charles Dickens."

In 1992 she founded SANEline, the UK's first national specialist out-of-hours mental health helpline, offering information and emotional support to individuals, families, carers, professionals, and the public.

In 1994 she raised over £6 million to build a new research centre, The Prince of Wales International Centre for SANE Research, with donations from Xylas family, Prince Turki Al Faisal and the Sultan of Brunei. The centre promotes and hosts multidisciplinary teams researching and investigating the causes of psychosis. It was opened by Prince Charles in 2003.

=== The Silent Twins ===
In 1982 Wallace met June and Jennifer Gibbons, identical twins who had made a pact of silence to speak only with each other and no-one else. The twins were admitted to Broadmoor Hospital following a string of offences, including vandalism and arson. They remained at Broadmoor for 11 years, where Wallace earned their trust and publicised their cause.

In 1986 she published The Silent Twins, which brought the twins to international attention, with Oliver Sacks writing that it was “a remarkable and tragic study in its depth, penetration and detail". Wallace wrote the screenplay for the BBC film directed by Jon Amiel.

The story was also turned into numerous plays, documentaries and two operas. Another film version of The Silent Twins, featuring Letitia Wright and Tamara Wilson, premiered at the 2022 Cannes Film Festival.

== Personal life ==
In 1974 Wallace married the psychiatrist and psychoanalyst Andrzej Skarbek, with whom she had three children: Sacha, Stefan and Justin. The couple later separated, but did not divorce.

She was later the partner of Tom Margerison, founder of the New Scientist magazine and co-founder of London Weekend Television. They had one daughter together: Sophia. Margerison died in 2014.

For over 40 years she was a close friend and confidante of Antony Armstrong-Jones, Earl of Snowdon. The couple campaigned together, writing articles for The Sunday Times about disadvantaged and disabled people, and were later romantically involved.

In May 2021 she married the businessman, entrepreneur and economist John Mills.

== Recognition ==
- 1982. Campaigning Journalist of the Year.
- 1986. Campaigning Journalist of the Year.
- 1988. The Snowdon Special Award.
- 1989. Appointed Guardian Fellow at Nuffield College, University of Oxford.
- 1994. Member of the Order of the British Empire (MBE).
- 1997. Honorary Fellow of the Royal College of Psychiatrists.
- 2002. British Neuroscience Association Award.
- 2004. Appointed Fellow of University College London.
- 2006. Recognised as one of the 16 key achievers who had made a difference in the health sector by the National Portrait Gallery.
- 2008. Commander of the Order of the British Empire (CBE).
- 2016. Outstanding Campaigner at the Women of the Year Awards for “advocating and raising greater awareness of mental health".
- 2019. Appointed an Honorary Member of The World Psychiatric Association.

== Selected filmography ==
- 1990. Whose Mind Is It Anyway? BBC One.
- 1995. Circles of Madness. BBC.
- 1997. In the Psychiatrist's Chair. BBC Radio 4.
- 2014. Inheritance Tracks. BBC Radio 4.
- 2015. Desert Island Discs. BBC Radio 4.

== Selected bibliography ==
- 1976. On Giant's Shoulders: The Story of Terry Wiles. Times Books.
- 1978. Suffer the Children: The Story of Thalidomide. Viking Press.
- 1979. The Superpoison. Macmillan.
- 1986. The Silent Twins. Penguin.
