= Stephen Colbert =

American comedian, writer and television host (born 1964)

- Colbert in 2025
- Born: Stephen Tyrone Colbert; May 13, 1964 (age 62); Washington, D.C., U.S.
- Education: Northwestern University (BA)
- Spouse: Evelyn McGee (m. 1993)
- Children: 3
- Father: James William Colbert Jr.
- Relatives: Elizabeth Colbert Busch (sister)
- Awards: Full list

Comedy career
- Years active: 1984–present
- Medium: Television; film; theater; books
- Genres: Political/news satire; improvisational comedy; black comedy; character comedy; sketch comedy; surreal humor
- Subjects: American politics; American culture; political punditry; pop culture; current events; mass media/news media; civil rights; religion; social awkwardness; human sexuality; human behavior

Stephen Tyrone Colbert (/koʊlˈbɛər/ kohl-BAIR; born May 13, 1964) is an American comedian, writer, producer, political commentator, actor, and television host. He is best known for hosting the Comedy Central news satire show The Colbert Report from 2005 to 2014, and the CBS late-night talk show The Late Show with Stephen Colbert from 2015 to 2026.

The son of immunologist James William Colbert Jr., Colbert was raised a Catholic in South Carolina. He originally studied to be a dramatic actor, but became interested in improvisational theater while attending Northwestern University, where he met Second City director Del Close. Colbert first performed professionally as an understudy for Steve Carell at Second City Chicago. Paul Dinello and Amy Sedaris, comedians with whom he developed the sketch comedy series Exit 57, were in his troupe. Colbert performed on The Dana Carvey Show (1996) and wrote for the show, before collaborating again with Sedaris and Dinello on the sitcom Strangers with Candy (1999–2000).

Colbert's work as a correspondent on Comedy Central's news-parody series The Daily Show gained him wide recognition. In 2005, he left The Daily Show to host The Colbert Report. Following The Daily Show's news-parody concept, The Colbert Report was a parody of personality-driven political opinion shows including The O'Reilly Factor, in which he portrayed a caricatured version of conservative political pundits. In the first episode, he introduced the neologism truthiness, which was named Word of the Year by the American Dialect Society and Merriam Webster. It earned him an invitation to perform as featured entertainer at the White House Correspondents' Association Dinner in 2006, which he did in character. This event led to the series becoming one of Comedy Central's highest-rated series. In 2010, he and Jon Stewart headlined the Rally to Restore Sanity and/or Fear. In 2011, he started the satirical Colbert Super PAC, which was credited with raising awareness of campaign finance issues. After ending The Colbert Report, he was hired in 2015 to succeed David Letterman, who was retiring as host of the Late Show on CBS. Colbert hosted the 69th Primetime Emmy Awards in September 2017.

Colbert has won eleven Primetime Emmy Awards, two Grammy Awards, and three Peabody Awards. Colbert was named one of Time's 100 Most Influential People in 2006 and 2012. His book I Am America (And So Can You!) was listed No. 1 on The New York Times Best Seller list in 2007.

== Early life and education ==
Stephen Tyrone Colbert was born in Washington, D.C., the youngest of eleven children (James III, Edward, Mary, William, Margo, Thomas, Jay, Elizabeth, Paul, and Peter) in a Catholic family. He lived for a few years in Bethesda, Maryland. Next, he grew up in James Island, an island and a suburb of Charleston, South Carolina. His father, James William Colbert Jr., was an immunologist and medical school dean at Yale University, Saint Louis University, and at the Medical University of South Carolina in Charleston. From 1969, James Colbert Jr. was the school's first vice president of academic affairs. Colbert's mother, Lorna Elizabeth Colbert (née Tuck), was a homemaker.

In interviews, Colbert has described his parents as devout people who nevertheless strongly valued intellectualism, and taught their children that it was possible to question the Church and still be Catholic. He has said his father was interested in French humanist writers including Léon Bloy and Jacques Maritain, while his mother was fond of Catholic Worker Movement leader Dorothy Day. Regardless, Colbert recalls having a "pretty conservative upbringing", with his mother voting for a Democrat exactly once in her life (John F. Kennedy). In an interview, his mother has described him as "rambunctious". As a child, he observed that Southerners were often depicted as being less intelligent than other characters on scripted television; to avoid that stereotype, he taught himself to imitate the speech of American news anchors, particularly John Chancellor.

Colbert sometimes jokingly claims that his surname is French, but in reality his ancestry is fifteen-sixteenths Irish (one of his paternal great-great-grandmothers was of German and English descent). Many of his ancestors emigrated from Ireland to North America in the 19th century before and during the Great Famine. Originally, his surname was pronounced /ˈkoʊlbərt/ KOHL-bərt in English; Colbert's father, James, wanted to pronounce the name /koʊlˈbɛər/ kohl-BAIR, but maintained the /ˈkoʊlbərt/ pronunciation out of respect for his own father. He offered his children the option to pronounce the name whichever way they preferred. Colbert started using /koʊlˈbɛər/ later in life when he transferred to Northwestern University, taking advantage of the opportunity to reinvent himself in a new place where no one knew him. Colbert's brother Edward, an intellectual-property attorney, retained /ˈkoʊlbərt/; this was shown in a February 12, 2009, appearance on The Colbert Report, when his second-oldest brother asked him, "/ˈkoʊlbərt/ or /koʊlˈbɛər/?" Ed responded "/ˈkoʊlbərt/", to which he jokingly replied, "See you in Hell."

On September 11, 1974, when Colbert was ten years old, his father and his brothers Paul and Peter, who were closest to him in age, died in the crash of Eastern Air Lines Flight 212 while it was attempting to land in Charlotte, North Carolina. They were en route to enroll Paul and Peter at Canterbury School in New Milford, Connecticut. He has discussed the impact the tragedy has on him and his philosophy of grief and suffering. Lorna Colbert moved the family from James Island to the George Chisolm House, in downtown Charleston, and she ran the carriage house as a bed and breakfast.

Colbert found the transition difficult and did not easily make friends in the new neighborhood. Later he described himself during this time as being detached, lacking a sense of importance regarding the things with which other children concerned themselves. "Nothing made any sense after my father and my brothers died. I kind of just shut off," he recalled. He developed a love of science fiction and fantasy novels, especially the works of J. R. R. Tolkien, of which he remains an avid fan. During his adolescence, he developed an intense interest in fantasy role-playing games, especially Dungeons & Dragons, a pastime which he later characterized as an early experience in acting and improvisation.

Colbert attended Porter-Gaud School, an Episcopal school in Charleston, participating in several school plays and contributing to the school newspaper, but he was not highly motivated academically. During his adolescence, he briefly fronted A Shot in the Dark, a Rolling Stones cover band. When he was younger, he had hoped to study marine biology, but surgery intended to repair a severely perforated eardrum caused him inner-ear damage severe enough to preclude a career involving scuba diving, and leaving him deaf in his right ear.

For a while, he was uncertain whether he would attend college, but eventually he applied and was accepted to Hampden–Sydney College in Virginia, where a friend had also enrolled. Arriving in 1982, he majored in philosophy and continued to participate in plays. He found the curriculum to be rigorous, but was more focused than he had been in high school and was able to apply himself to his studies. He developed an appreciation for stoicism, and the writings of Marcus Aurelius, jokingly claiming that "[I] was a stoic before it was cool". Despite the lack of a significant theater community at Hampden–Sydney, Colbert's interest in acting escalated during this time. After two years, he transferred in 1984 to Northwestern University as a theater major to study performance, emboldened by the realization that he loved performing, even when no one was coming to shows. He graduated from Northwestern's School of Communication in 1986. While at Northwestern, he was in an improv group with David Schwimmer called the No Fun Mud Piranhas. At age 21, Colbert auditioned and was subsequently accepted for the graduate drama program at New York University, but ended up declining to act in Chicago.

== Early career in comedy ==
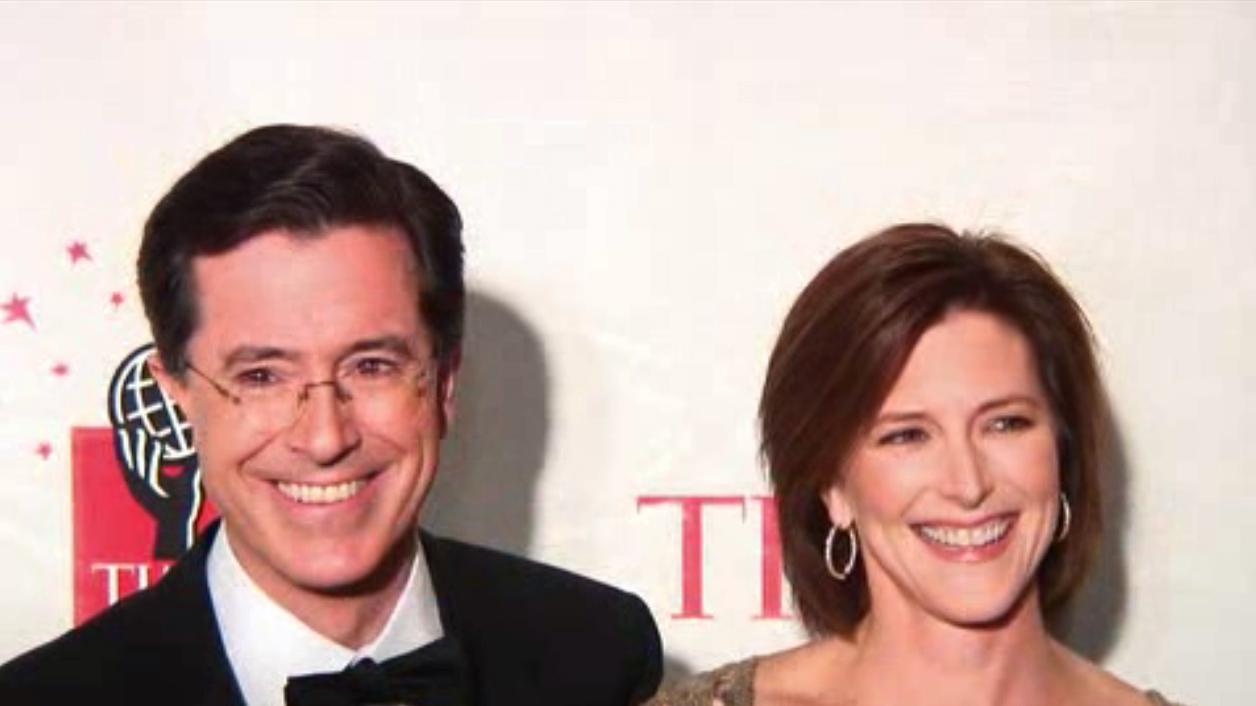
Colbert and his wife Evelyn McGee at the Time 100 list event, May 2006

While at Northwestern, Colbert studied with the intent of becoming a dramatic actor; mostly he performed in experimental plays and was uninterested in comedy. He began performing improvisation while in college, both in the campus improv team No Fun Mud Piranhas and at the Annoyance Theatre in Chicago as a part of Del Close's ImprovOlympic at a time when the project was focused on competitive, long-form improvisation, rather than improvisational comedy. "I wasn't gonna do Second City", Colbert later recalled, "because those Annoyance people looked down on Second City because they thought it wasn't pure improv – there was a slightly snobby, mystical quality to the Annoyance people". After Colbert graduated in 1986, however, he was in need of a job. He was accepted for an internship at Late Night with David Letterman, which he rejected because it was unpaid. A friend who was employed at Second City's box office offered him work answering phones and selling souvenirs. Colbert accepted and discovered that Second City employees were entitled to take classes at their training center free of charge. Despite his earlier aversion to the comedy group, he signed up for improvisation classes and enjoyed the experience greatly.

Shortly thereafter, he was hired to perform with Second City's touring company, initially as an understudy for Steve Carell. It was there he met Amy Sedaris and Paul Dinello, with whom he often collaborated later in his career. By their retelling, the three comedians did not get along at first – Dinello thought Colbert was uptight, pretentious and cold, while Colbert thought of Dinello as "an illiterate thug" – but the trio became close friends while touring together, discovering that they shared a similar comic sensibility.

Robert Smigel, initially looking for Carell, scouted Colbert at Second City and became "obsessed" with working with him. Smigel tried to get him hired at Saturday Night Live, for which Colbert unsuccessfully auditioned, in 1992. A year later, Smigel, then head writer at Late Night with Conan O'Brien, wanted to get him involved in the show either as writer or performer, but after Colbert had a meeting with O'Brien, the host did not think there was a place for him. When Sedaris and Dinello were offered the opportunity to create a television series for HBO Downtown Productions, Colbert left Second City and relocated to New York to work with them on the sketch comedy show Exit 57. The series debuted on Comedy Central in 1995 and aired through 1996. Although it lasted only 12 episodes, the show received favorable reviews and was nominated for five CableACE Awards in 1995, in categories including best writing, performance, and comedy series.

== Television career ==
=== The Dana Carvey Show (1996) ===
Following the cancelation of Exit 57, Colbert worked for six months as a cast member and writer on The Dana Carvey Show, alongside former Second City castmate Steve Carell, and also Smigel, Charlie Kaufman, Louis C.K., and Dino Stamatopoulos, among others. The series, described by one reviewer as "kamikaze satire" in "borderline-questionable taste", had sponsors pull out after its first episode aired and was canceled after seven episodes. Colbert then worked briefly as a freelance writer for Saturday Night Live with Smigel, after unsuccessfully auditioning for a second time. Smigel brought his animated sketch, The Ambiguously Gay Duo, to SNL from The Dana Carvey Show; Colbert provided the voice of Ace on both series, opposite Steve Carell as Gary. Needing money, he also worked as a script consultant, for VH1 and MTV, and applied to be a writer on the Late Show with David Letterman, alongside his writing partner Paul Dinello, before taking a job filming humorous correspondent segments for Good Morning America. Only two of the segments he proposed were ever produced and only one aired, but the job led his agent to refer him to The Daily Show's producer, Madeline Smithberg, who hired Colbert on a trial basis in 1997.

=== Strangers with Candy (1999–2000) ===
During the same period, Colbert worked again with Sedaris and Dinello to develop a new comedy series for Comedy Central, Strangers with Candy. Comedy Central picked up the series in 1998 after Colbert had already begun working on The Daily Show. As a result, he accepted a reduced role, filming only around 20 Daily Show segments a year while he worked on the new series.

Strangers with Candy was conceived of as a parody of after school specials, following the life of Jerri Blank, a 46-year-old dropout who returns to finish high school after 32 years of life on the street. Most noted by critics for its use of offensive humor, it concluded each episode by delivering to the audience a skewed, politically incorrect moral lesson. Colbert served as a main writer alongside Sedaris and Dinello, and portrayed Jerri's strict but uninformed history teacher, Chuck Noblet, seen throughout the series dispensing inaccurate information to his classes. Colbert has likened this to the character he played on The Daily Show and later The Colbert Report, claiming that he has a very specific niche in portraying "poorly informed, high-status idiot" characters. Another running joke throughout the series was that Noblet, a closeted homosexual, was having a "secret" affair with fellow teacher Geoffrey Jellineck, despite the fact that their relationship was apparent to everyone around them. This obliviousness also appears in Colbert's Daily Show and Colbert Report character.

Thirty episodes of Strangers with Candy were made, which aired on Comedy Central in 1999 and 2000. Though its ratings were not remarkable during its initial run, it has been characterized as a cult show with a small but dedicated audience. Colbert reprised his role for a film adaptation which premiered at the Sundance Film Festival in 2005 and had a limited release in 2006. The film received mixed reviews. Colbert also co-wrote the screenplay with Sedaris and Dinello.

=== The Daily Show (1997–2005) ===
Colbert joined the cast of Comedy Central's parody-news series The Daily Show in 1997, when the show was in its second season. Originally one of four correspondents who filmed segments from remote locations in the style of network news field reporters, Colbert was referred to as "the new guy" on-air for his first two years on the show, during which time Craig Kilborn served as host. When Kilborn left the show prior to the 1999 season, Jon Stewart took over hosting duties, also serving as a writer and co-executive producer. From this point, the series gradually began to take on a more political tone and increase in popularity, particularly in the latter part of the 2000 U.S. presidential election season. The roles of the show's correspondents were expanded to include more in-studio segments and international reports, which were almost always done in the studio with the aid of a greenscreen. Colbert usually wrote and edited his own pieces.

Unlike Stewart, who essentially hosted The Daily Show as himself, Colbert developed a correspondent character for his pieces on the series that was a parody of conservative political pundits such as Bill O'Reilly. Colbert has described his correspondent character as "a well-intentioned, poorly informed, high-status idiot" and "a fool who has spent a lot of his life playing not the fool – one who is able to cover it at least well enough to deal with the subjects that he deals with". Colbert was frequently pitted against knowledgeable interview subjects, or against Stewart in scripted exchanges, with the resultant dialogue demonstrating the character's lack of knowledge of whatever subject he is discussing. Colbert also made generous use of humorous fallacies of logic in explaining his point of view on any topic. Other Daily Show correspondents have adopted a similar style; former correspondent Rob Corddry recalls that when he and Ed Helms first joined the show's cast in 2002, they "just imitated Stephen Colbert for a year or two". Correspondent Aasif Mandvi has stated "I just decided I was going to do my best Stephen Colbert impression". Reminiscing on his hiring, Smithberg said, "We saw what comedy genius was up close".

Colbert appeared in several recurring segments for The Daily Show, including "Even Stevphen" with Steve Carell, in which both characters were expected to debate a selected topic but instead would unleash their anger at one another. Colbert commonly hosted "This Week in God", a report on topics in the news pertaining to religion, presented with the help of the "God Machine". Colbert filed reports from the floor of the Democratic National Convention and the Republican National Convention as a part of The Daily Show's award-winning coverage of the 2000 and 2004 U.S. presidential elections; many from the latter were included as part of their The Daily Show: Indecision 2004 DVD release. Other pieces that have been named as his signature segments include "Grouse Hunting in Shropshire", in which he reported on the "gayness" of British aristocracy, his mock lionization of a smoking-rights activist and apparent chain-smoker, and his cameo appearances during his faux campaign for president. In several episodes of The Daily Show, Colbert filled in as anchor in the absence of Jon Stewart, including the full week of March 3, 2002, when Stewart was scheduled to host Saturday Night Live. After Colbert left the show, Rob Corddry took over "This Week in God" segments, although a recorded sample of Colbert's voice was still used as the sound effect for the God Machine. Later episodes of The Daily Show have reused older Colbert segments under the label "Klassic Kolbert". Colbert won three Emmys as a writer of The Daily Show in 2004, 2005, and 2006.

=== The Colbert Report (2005–2014) ===
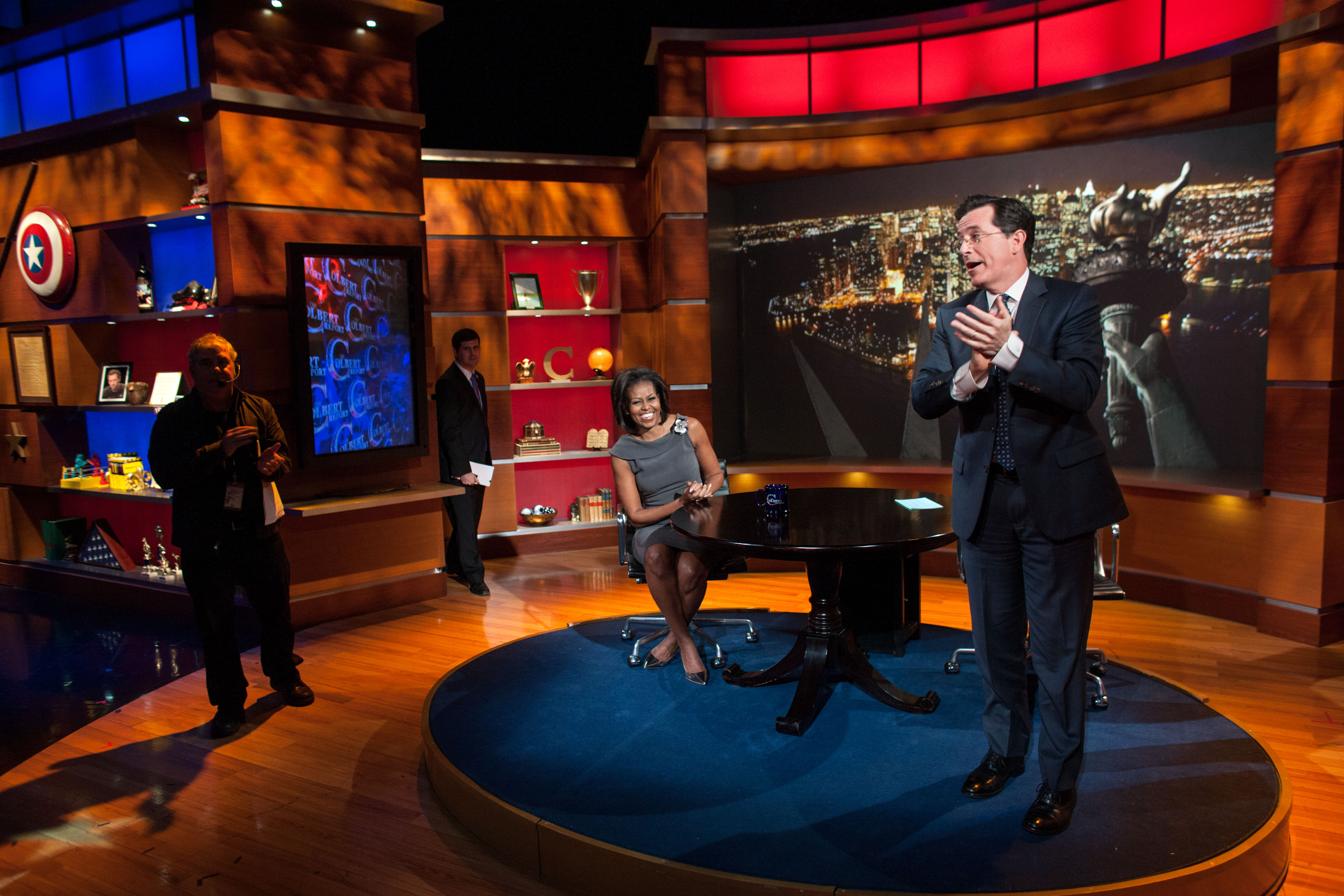
Colbert, in his television series persona, prepares to interview Michelle Obama; the set decor of The Colbert Report satirized cable-personality political talk shows.

Colbert hosted his own television show, The Colbert Report, from October 17, 2005, through December 18, 2014. The Colbert Report was a Daily Show spin-off that parodied the conventions of television news broadcasting, particularly cable-personality political talk shows like The O'Reilly Factor, Hannity, and Glenn Beck. Colbert hosted the show in-character as a blustery right-wing pundit, generally considered to be an extension of his character on The Daily Show. Conceived by co-creators Stewart, Colbert, and Ben Karlin in part as an opportunity to explore "the character-driven news", the series focused less on the day-to-day news style of the Daily Show, instead frequently concentrating on the foibles of the host-character himself.

The concept for The Report was first seen in a series of Daily Show segments which advertised the then-fictional series as a joke. It was later developed by Stewart's Busboy Productions and pitched to Comedy Central, which green-lighted the program; Comedy Central had already been searching for a way to extend the successful Daily Show franchise beyond a half-hour. The series opened to strong ratings, averaging 1.2 million viewers nightly during its first week on the air. Comedy Central signed a long-term contract for The Colbert Report within its first month on the air, when it immediately established itself among the network's highest-rated shows.

Much of Colbert's personal life was reflected in his character on The Colbert Report. With the extended exposure of the character on the show, he often referenced his interest in and knowledge of Catholicism, science fiction, and The Lord of the Rings, as well as using real facts to create his character's history. His alternate persona was also raised in South Carolina, is the youngest of 11 siblings and is married. However, Colbert's actual career history in acting and comedy was often downplayed or even denied outright, and he frequently referred to having attended Dartmouth College (which was at the forefront of the conservative campus movement in the 1980s) rather than his actual alma mater, Northwestern. In July 2012, Colbert added two years to his contract with Comedy Central, extending the run of The Colbert Report until the end of 2014.

The final episode on December 18, 2014, featured a rendition of "We'll Meet Again" and appearances from former guests of the show, including Jon Stewart, Randy Newman, Bryan Cranston, Willie Nelson, Yo-Yo Ma, Mandy Patinkin, Neil deGrasse Tyson, Tom Brokaw, David Gregory, J. J. Abrams, Big Bird, Gloria Steinem, Ken Burns, James Franco, Barry Manilow, Bob Costas, Jeff Daniels, Sam Waterston, Bill de Blasio, Katie Couric, Patrick Stewart, George Lucas, Henry Kissinger, Cookie Monster, Alan Alda, Eliot Spitzer, Vince Gilligan, Paul Krugman, and a text from Bill Clinton. There were appearances by astronauts and U.S. and coalition Afghanistan forces. It "ended with him killing death and becoming immortal, then flying off with Santa Claus, a unicorn-horned Abraham Lincoln and Alex Trebek."

=== The Late Show (2015–2026) ===
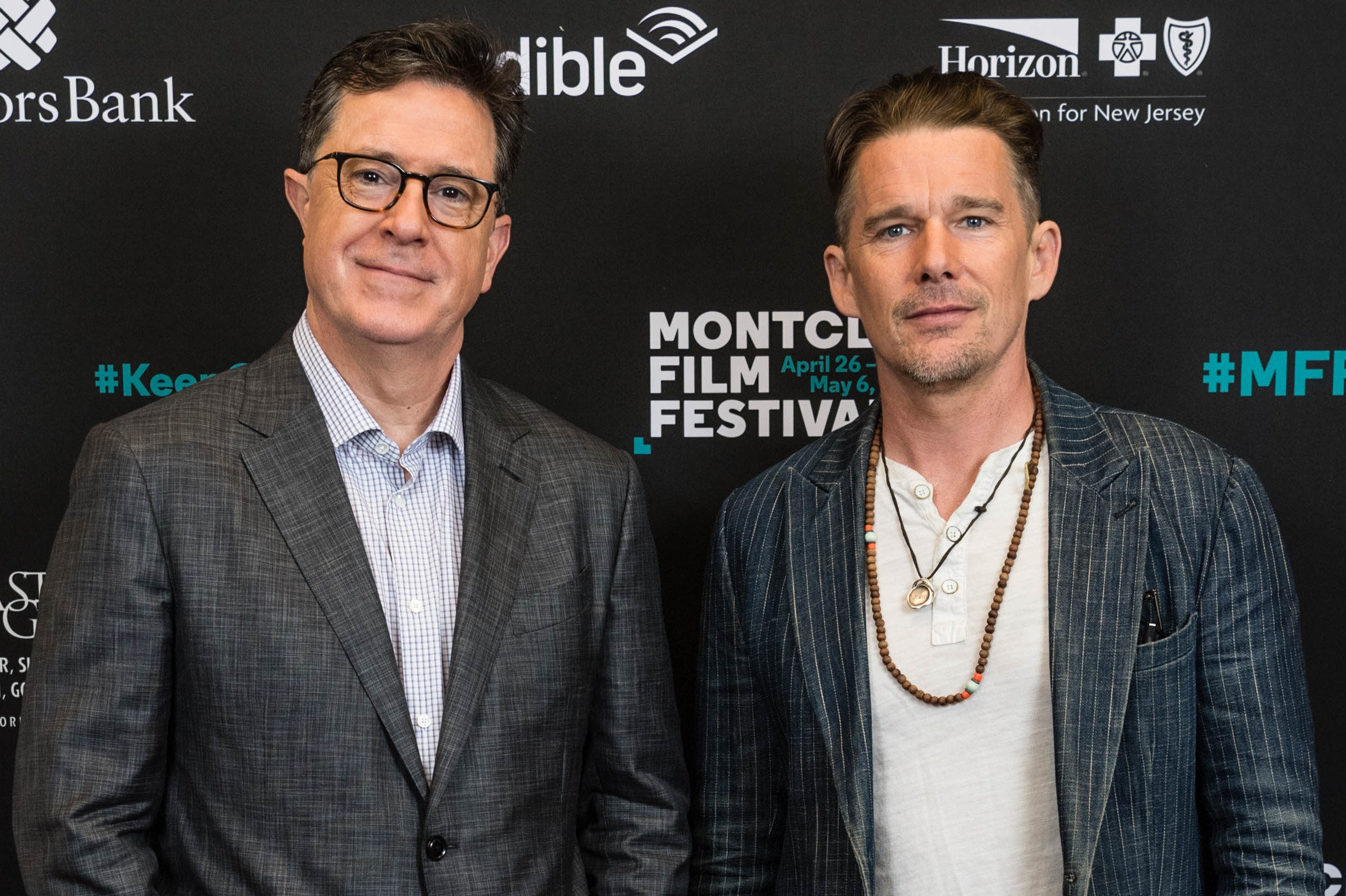
Colbert with actor Ethan Hawke in 2018

On April 10, 2014, CBS announced in a press release that Colbert "will succeed David Letterman as the host of The Late Show, effective when Mr. Letterman retires from the broadcast." On January 12, 2015, CBS announced that Colbert would premiere as the Late Show host on Tuesday, September 8, 2015. The first guest of the new Late Show was George Clooney. The show has a much more political focus than Letterman's Late Show. It featured a Colbert Book Club, and segments on the arts, like Dame Helen Mirren reading Tennyson's "Ulysses".

During his tenure as the host of The Late Show, Colbert hosted the 69th Primetime Emmy Awards, broadcast on CBS on September 17, 2017. In 2021, he and his Spartina Productions company signed a deal with CBS Studios, through which programs such as Tooning Out the News and Fairview were produced. Colbert was also an executive producer on Comedy Central's Tha God's Honest Truth. On August 30, 2023, Colbert and fellow talk show hosts Jimmy Fallon, Seth Meyers, Jimmy Kimmel, and John Oliver, began hosting the comedy podcast Strike Force Five to support their staff members out of work due to the 2023 Writers Guild of America strike. From 2024 to 2025, he was a producer on the CBS late-night comedy panel game show, After Midnight, alongside his wife Evie. The show ended after two seasons, following host Taylor Tomlinson's departure.

On July 17, 2025, CBS announced that it would end The Late Show with Stephen Colbert and retire The Late Show franchise altogether in May 2026 after 33 years. The network, noting that the show has been No. 1 in late night for nine straight seasons, said: "Our admiration, affection, and respect for the talents of Stephen Colbert and his incredible team made this agonizing decision even more difficult. With much gratitude, we look forward to honoring Stephen and celebrating the show over the next 10 months alongside its millions of fans and viewers."

The show's cancellation, stated to be due to high production costs and declining advertising revenue, had been subject to speculation that it was tied to a settlement agreement reached two weeks earlier between Donald Trump and network parent Paramount Global in the former's lawsuit against CBS—filed in December 2024—alleging deceptive editing of a 60 Minutes broadcast featuring then-Democratic presidential nominee Kamala Harris, which occurred as the company sought FCC approval (regarding the transfer of its broadcast station licenses) for its merger with Skydance Media (which was completed on August 7, when the merged company was reincorporated as Paramount Skydance). Fellow talk show host Kimmel defended Colbert, calling Paramount's cited reasons "nonsensical", while Trump cheered it and said he "absolutely loves" that CBS canceled Colbert's show. On May 23, 2026, Trump posted an AI generated video on Truth Social depicting him throwing Colbert into a dumpster. Letterman said about the stated financial rather than political reason for the cancellation "I'm just going to go on record as saying: They're lying ... They're lying weasels."

On May 22, 2026, immediately following the final episode of The Late Show, Colbert guest hosted an episode of Only In Monroe, a public access talk show out of Monroe, Michigan. Colbert had previously hosted the show on July 1, 2015, to prepare for his upcoming hosting role. The episode featured guests Jack White, Steve Buscemi, Jeff Daniels, and Eminem. Colbert joked that it had been an "excruciating 23 hours without being on TV". In November 2026 it was announced that Colbert had signed with UTA.

== Politics ==
=== Views ===
Although, by his own account, he was not particularly political before joining the cast of The Daily Show, Colbert has described himself as a Democrat according to a 2004 interview. In an interview at the Kennedy School of Government at Harvard Institute of Politics, he said he has "no problems with Republicans, just Republican policies". Columnist and close friend Jonathan Alter has described him as "left of center". On the intersection of religious faith and politics, Colbert has pointed out that his views are in line with those of Cesar Chavez.

Alluding to the perception by the general public, due to his criticism of the Trump administration, Colbert has said: "People perceive me as this sort of lefty figure; I think I’m more conservative than people think. I just happen to be talking about a government in extremis".

Colbert owns a 1972 Richard Nixon campaign poster, which hangs on a wall in his office. The poster reads: "For the first time in 20 years we are spending more on human resources than on defense!" and highlights Nixon's compromise towards progressive issues. Colbert has half-jokingly made reference to those views: "He started the EPA. He opened China. He gave 18-year-olds the vote. His issues were education, drugs, women, minorities, youth involvement, ending the draft, and improving the environment. John Kerry couldn't have run on this!" As a child, he recalled being transfixed by the Watergate hearings, while his siblings explained the importance of what had happened. In 2013 he said that Nixon's prolongation of the Vietnam War for political gain, "Led to the deaths of tens of thousands of peoples, shattered the trust of the American people to the American military establishment, to trusting the president, and changed your [the press] relationship to the president forever." Adding that, "the depth of his selfish evil musn't be forgotten. Because while he's not the only one, he's the Ur for me".

Initially "all in" for Ronald Reagan, Colbert's political ideas shifted left as he went to Northwestern: "I'm not buying the hype because I see how well-staged all of this is. Then after that, I was in theater and there's no turning back." He has joked that Reagan is "in hell" for his handling of the AIDS crisis. While teaching improv at The Second City he would tell his students to read and stay informed; recommending them the works of Noam Chomsky.

Colbert has criticized the United States' use of drone strikes, and NSA's surveillance tactics, during the Obama administration.

He has also described the 2016 Democratic candidate, Hillary Clinton, as someone who has "been around for a long time, but actually represents - if I were to be pejorative [...] - steeped in what you would think of as the common systemic corruption of Washington, D.C., but that her experience obviates that particular sin. To a degree, that seems necessary in a complicated world," adding "I think people's hesitancy about Hillary Clinton is completely reasonable. [...] I can imagine that Trump might be the only person she could beat because she's not a great candidate. And she's got a lot of flaws and a lot of baggage that she can't shake off, however historic or even prepared for the job she is in this case." Also in 2016, Colbert described Donald Trump as "a monstrous aberration of our political history," stating, "We have never flirted with [a] strongman before. Not at this level. And so the political stakes seem enormous."

Colbert supports the implementation of the Medicare for All plan introduced by Bernie Sanders, considering it "a sensible fix to Obamacare". When asked about his views on abortion, Colbert positioned himself as pro-choice. During the 2023 writers' strike he showed his support to the writers, saying: "I'm a member of the guild. I support collective bargaining. This nation owes so much to unions." In May 2023, Colbert was permanently banned from entering Russia alongside 500 other Americans, due to being "involved in the spread of Russophobic attitudes and fakes." These bans were made in response to U.S. imposed sanctions on the country.

Colbert has been critical of Israel's treatment of Palestinians. He called for a ceasefire in Gaza after the 2024 World Central Kitchen aid convoy attack carried out by the IDF. Addressing Israeli prime minister Benjamin Netanyahu he said: "Nothing just happens. You are responsible. If your answer is, 'This happens in war,' then maybe consider ending the war." He also defended the pro-Palestine college protests saying: "Students should be allowed to protest. It's their first amendment right."

In March 2024, he moderated a fundraiser for the Joe Biden 2024 presidential campaign featuring Joe Biden, Bill Clinton and Barack Obama that raised $25 million. Following his performance in the first presidential debate on June 27, Colbert suggested that Biden should drop out of the race. In November 2025, he endorsed Democratic candidate Mikie Sherrill for the 2025 New Jersey gubernatorial election.

In November 2025, he was honored as a guest at a New York Public Radio fundraising gala for his commitment to free speech, where he expressed support for public broadcasting.

=== 2006 White House Correspondents' Dinner ===
On Saturday, April 29, 2006, Colbert was the featured entertainer for the 2006 White House Correspondents' Association Dinner. Standing a few yards from U.S. President George W. Bush – in front of an audience the Associated Press called a "Who's Who of power and celebrity" – Colbert delivered a searing routine targeting the president and the media. In his politically conservative character from The Colbert Report, Colbert satirized the George W. Bush Administration and the White House Press Corps:

I stand by this man. I stand by this man because he stands for things. Not only for things, he stands on things. Things like aircraft carriers and rubble and recently flooded city squares. And that sends a strong message, that no matter what happens to America, she will always rebound – with the most powerfully staged photo ops in the world.

He turned his attention to the press:

As excited as I am to be here with the president, I am appalled to be surrounded by the liberal media that is destroying America, with the exception of Fox News. Fox News gives you both sides of every story: the president's side, and the vice president's side.

But the rest of you, what are you thinking, reporting on NSA wiretapping or secret prisons in eastern Europe? Those things are secret for a very important reason: they're super-depressing. And if that's your goal, well, misery accomplished.

Over the last five years you people were so good – over tax cuts, WMD intelligence, the effect of global warming. We Americans didn't want to know, and you had the courtesy not to try to find out. Those were good times, as far as we knew.

But, listen, let's review the rules. Here's how it works: the president makes decisions. He's the Decider. The press secretary announces those decisions, and you people of the press type those decisions down. Make, announce, type. Just put 'em through a spell check and go home. Get to know your family again. Make love to your wife. Write that novel you got kicking around in your head. You know, the one about the intrepid Washington reporter with the courage to stand up to the administration. You know – fiction!

Colbert received a chilly response from the audience. His jokes were often met with silence and muttering, apart from the enthusiastic laughter of a few in the audience. The major media outlets paid little attention to it initially. Washington Post columnist Dan Froomkin and Columbia University Graduate School of Journalism professor Todd Gitlin claimed that this was because Colbert's routine was as critical of the media as it was of Bush. Richard Cohen, also writing for The Washington Post, responded that the routine was not funny. The video of Colbert's performance became an internet and media sensation, while in the week following the speech, ratings for The Colbert Report rose by 37% to average just under 1.5 million total viewers per episode. In Time magazine, James Poniewozik called it "the political-cultural touchstone issue of 2006". Writing six months later, New York Times columnist Frank Rich referred to Colbert's speech as a "cultural primary" and called it the "defining moment" of the 2006 midterm elections.

=== 2008 presidential campaign ===
Under his fictional persona in The Colbert Report, Colbert dropped hints of a potential presidential run throughout 2007, with speculation intensifying following the release of his book, I Am America (And So Can You!), which was rumored to be a sign that he was indeed testing the waters for a future bid for the White House. On October 16, 2007, he announced his candidacy on his show, stating his intention to run on both the Republican and Democratic platforms, but only as a "favorite son" in his native South Carolina. He later abandoned plans to run as a Republican due to the $35,000 fee required to file for the South Carolina primary; however, he continued to seek a place on the Democratic ballot and on October 28, 2007, campaigned in the South Carolina state capital of Columbia, where he was presented with the key to the city by Mayor Bob Coble.

After announcing his presidential ticket, he asked his viewers to cast their votes by donating to Donorschoose.org, an online charity connecting individuals to classrooms in need. Colbert's promotion inspired $68,000 in donations to South Carolina classrooms, which benefited over 14,000 low-income students. Colbert teamed up with Donorschoose.org again in 2008 by asking supporters of Barack Obama and Hillary Clinton to do the same. As a lead-up to the Pennsylvania primary, he created a "straw poll that makes a difference" by which people could donate to Pennsylvania classroom projects in honor of their favorite candidate. Colbert viewers donated $185,000 to projects reaching 43,000 students in Pennsylvania public schools.

On November 1, 2007, the South Carolina Democratic Party executive council voted 13–3 to refuse Colbert's application onto the ballot. "The general sense of the council was that he wasn't a serious candidate and that was why he wasn't selected to be on the ballot", stated John Werner, the party's director. Several days later he announced that he was dropping out of the race, saying he did not wish to put the country through an agonizing Supreme Court battle (referencing the 2000 election, wherein a tight recount in Florida was settled in a landmark Supreme Court decision). CNN has reported that Obama supporters pressured the South Carolina Democratic Executive Council to keep Colbert off the ballot. One anonymous member of the council told CNN that former State Superintendent of Education Inez Tenenbaum had placed pressure on them to refuse Colbert's application despite his steady rise in polls.

Though Colbert's real-life presidential campaign had ended, Marvel Comics editor-in-chief Joe Quesada established in an interview on The Colbert Report that Colbert's campaign was still going strong in the fictional Marvel Universe, citing the cover art of a then-recent issue of The Amazing Spider-Man which featured a Colbert campaign billboard in the background. Background appearances of Colbert campaign ads continued to appear in Marvel Comics publications, as late as August 2008's Secret Invasion No. 5 (which also features a cameo of an alien Skrull posing as Colbert). In October 2008, Colbert made an extended 8-page appearance webslinging with Spider-Man in The Amazing Spider-Man issue No. 573. Colbert voiced the president of the U.S. in the 2009 film Monsters vs. Aliens.

=== 2009 solidarity with U.S. troops in Iraq War ===
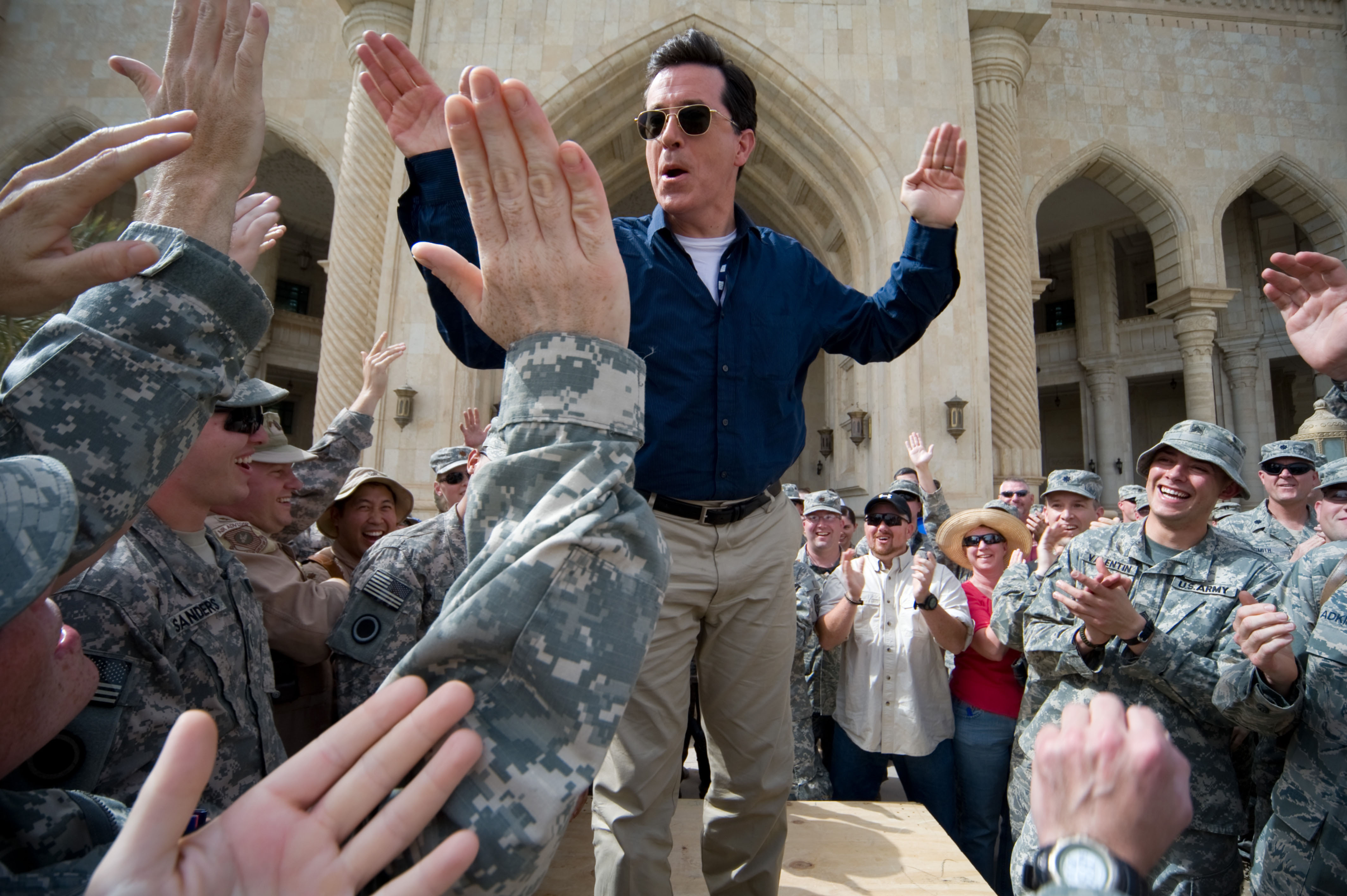
Colbert greets troops and civilians at Al Faw Palace at Camp Victory in Baghdad, Iraq, June 5, as part of his "Operation Iraqi Stephen: Going Commando" tour.

Colbert arrived in Baghdad, Iraq, on June 5, 2009, to film a week of shows called "Operation Iraqi Stephen: Going Commando" sponsored by the USO (United Service Organizations). Colbert had a suit tailored for him in the Army Combat Uniform pattern. During the first episode (which featured a cameo appearance from U.S. president Barack Obama), Colbert had his hair cropped in a military style to show his solidarity with the troops. One Army major said that "shaving of the hair is an amazing show of support" that was "very touching." USO Senior Vice President John Hanson said the shows are an important diversion for the troops.

=== 2010 Congressional testimony ===
On September 24, 2010, Colbert testified in character before the House Judiciary Subcommittee on Immigration, Citizenship, and Border Security. He was invited by committee chairwoman Zoe Lofgren to describe his experience participating in the United Farm Workers' "Take Our Jobs" program, where he spent a day working alongside migrant workers in upstate New York. At the end of his often-humorous testimony, Colbert broke character in responding to a question from Rep. Judy Chu, D-CA, and explained his purpose for being at the hearing:

I like talking about people who don't have any power, and this seems like one of the least powerful people in the United States are migrant workers who come and do our work, but don't have any rights as a result. And yet we still invite them to come here and at the same time ask them to leave. And that's an interesting contradiction to me. And, you know, "Whatsoever you do for the least of my brothers," and these seem like the least of our brothers right now ... Migrant workers suffer and have no rights.

Democratic committee member John Conyers questioned whether it was appropriate for the comedian to appear before Congress and asked him to leave the hearing. Though Colbert offered to depart at the direction of the committee chairwoman, Lofgren requested that he stay at least until all opening testimony had been completed, whereupon Conyers withdrew his request.

Conservative pundits took aim at Colbert's testimony not long afterwards. Yuval Levin of The Corner wrote, "Painfully awkward and pointless, it made the committee's majority members look ridiculous. Colbert can be very funny, but his kind of sarcasm only works in some contexts, and a House committee hearing room does not appear to be one of them. Ed Morrissey of Hot Air said, "As John Conyers notes, the media and spectators turned out to see whether Colbert would address the panel seriously as an expert on immigration and make the panel a joke, or stay in character and make the panel a bigger joke."

=== 2010 Washington, D.C. rallies ===
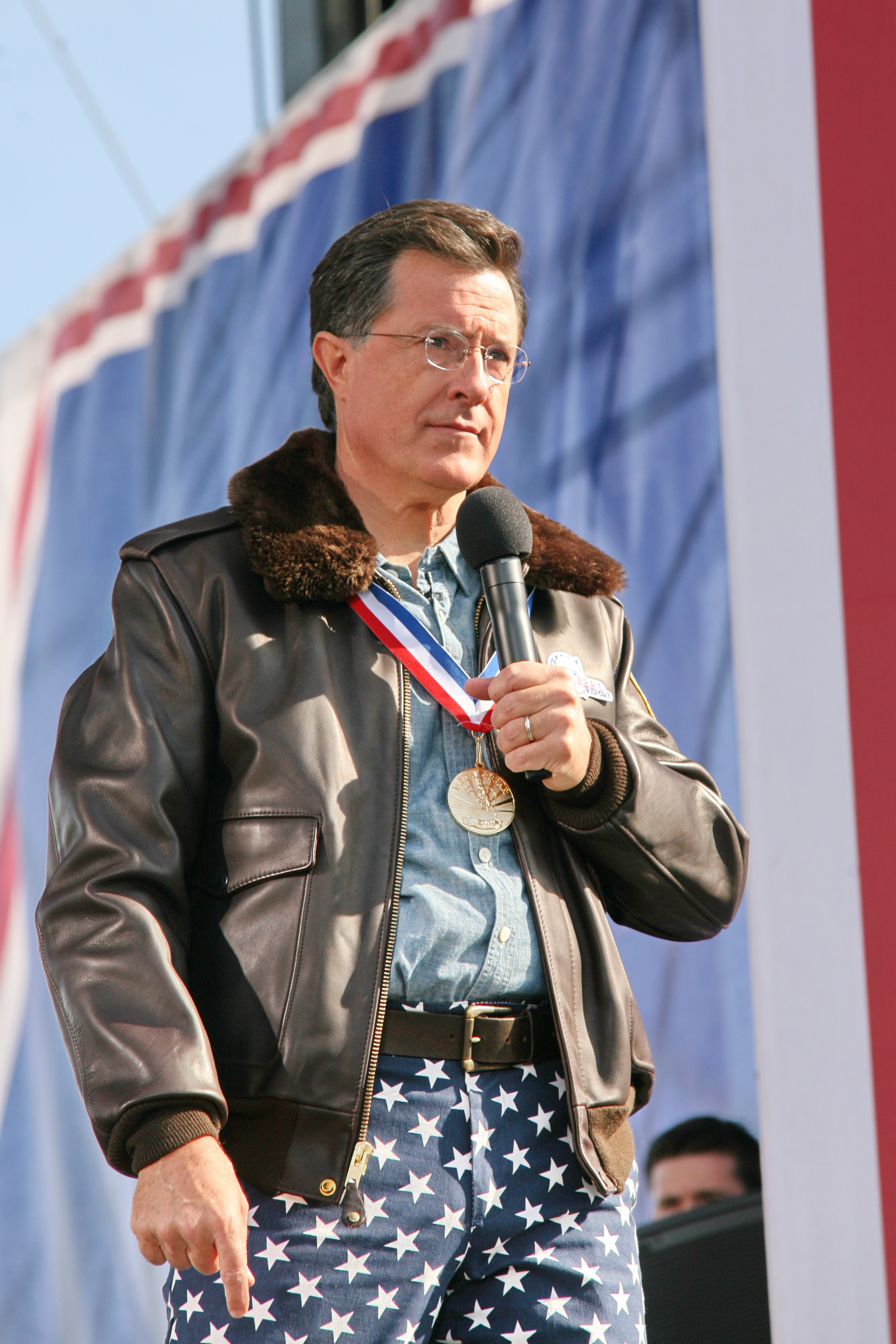
Colbert at the Rally to Restore Sanity and/or Fear in Washington, D.C., October 2010

In September 2010, following Glenn Beck's Restoring Honor rally, a campaign developed that called for Colbert to hold his own rally at the Lincoln Memorial. On the September 10, 2010, episode of the Daily Show and The Colbert Report, Stewart and Colbert made preannouncements of a future event. On September 16, 2010, Stewart and Colbert announced competing rallies on the Washington, D.C., Mall on October 30, 2010, Stewart's "Rally to Restore Sanity", and Colbert's "March to Keep Fear Alive". Both were eventually merged into the Rally to Restore Sanity and/or Fear.

=== 2011 Super PAC ===
In May 2011, Colbert filed a request with the Federal Election Commission (FEC) asking for a media exemption for coverage of his political action committee, ColbertPAC, on The Colbert Report. In June 2011, during a public meeting, the FEC voted 5–1 to grant The Colbert Report a limited media exemption. The exemption allows unlimited donations of airtime and show resources to promote the Colbert Super PAC without requiring disclosure to the FEC, but only for ads appearing on The Colbert Report. Following the hearing, Colbert formally filed paperwork for the creation of his Super PAC with the FEC secretary. In 2012, Colbert received a Peabody for his reporting about the Super PAC, officially registered as "Americans for a Better Tomorrow, Tomorrow, Inc." and "Colbert Super PAC SHH Institute" as an "innovative means of teaching American viewers about the landmark court decision".

=== 2012 South Carolina GOP primary ===
After the 2012 New Hampshire primary, a poll for the South Carolina primary taken by Public Policy Polling (of 1,112 likely GOP voters, January 5–7, 2012) was reported to place Colbert at 5%, one point ahead of Jon Huntsman polling at 4%, in spite of the fact that Colbert was not on the ballot. This poll showed Colbert to be closely behind Rick Perry's 7% and Ron Paul's 8% (with Mitt Romney at 27%, Newt Gingrich 23% and Rick Santorum at 18%). On the January 11 episode of The Colbert Report, Colbert asked his audience if he should run for president in South Carolina, to which he received strong applause. He then stated that he would be making a "Major Announcement" during the next day's show. On January 12, Colbert started his show by discussing his role in the presidential campaign, then addressed the law preventing him from being a presidential candidate while running his Super PAC. With the help of his lawyer Trevor Potter, he then signed over control of his Super PAC to Jon Stewart, with the organization title then being referred to as "The Definitely Not Coordinating With Stephen Colbert Super PAC". Immediately after this legal block was out of the way, Colbert announced, "I am forming an exploratory committee to lay the groundwork for my possible candidacy for the President of the United States of South Carolina. I'm doin' it!" He reiterated in the interview portion of that show that "I'm still in the exploratory phase" of his presidential campaign.

On the January 16, 2012, episode, Colbert satirically encouraged his viewers to vote for Herman Cain in the South Carolina primary. As Cain was still on the ballot, despite having recently dropped out of the race, Colbert announced that he would consider any votes cast for Cain to be in direct support of his own possible candidacy.

== Other work ==
Colbert is co-author of the satirical text-and-picture novel Wigfield: The Can Do Town That Just May Not, which was published in 2003 by Hyperion Books. The novel was a collaboration between Colbert, Amy Sedaris, and Paul Dinello, and tells the story of a small town threatened by the impending destruction of a massive dam. The narrative is presented as a series of fictional interviews with the town's residents, accompanied by photos. The three authors toured performing an adaptation of Wigfield on stage the same year the book was released.

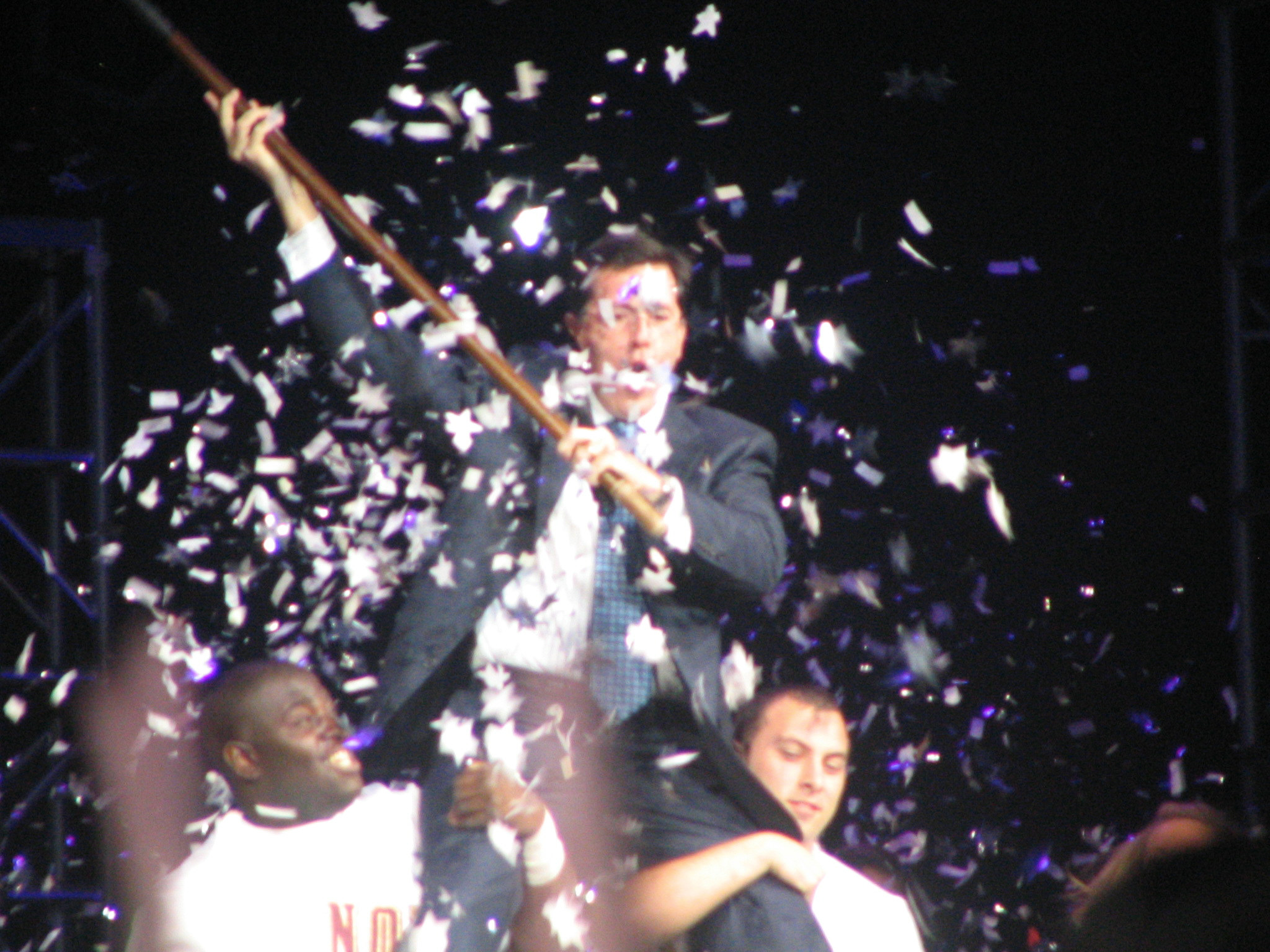
Colbert at an event at Florida State University in Tallahassee, November 2006

Colbert appeared in a small supporting role in the 2005 film adaptation of Bewitched. He has made guest appearances on the television series Curb Your Enthusiasm, Spin City, and Law & Order: Criminal Intent, and on the first season of the American improvisational comedy show Whose Line Is It Anyway?. He voiced the characters of Reducto and Phil Ken Sebben in the Adult Swim's Harvey Birdman, Attorney at Law, but left the show in 2005 to work on The Colbert Report. His characters were both killed, though he returned to voice Phil for the series finale. Colbert also has provided voices for Cartoon Network's The Venture Bros., Comedy Central's Crank Yankers, and American Dad!, and for Canadian animated comedy series The Wrong Coast. He appeared as Homer Simpson's life coach, Colby Krause, in The Simpsons episode "He Loves to Fly and He D'ohs".

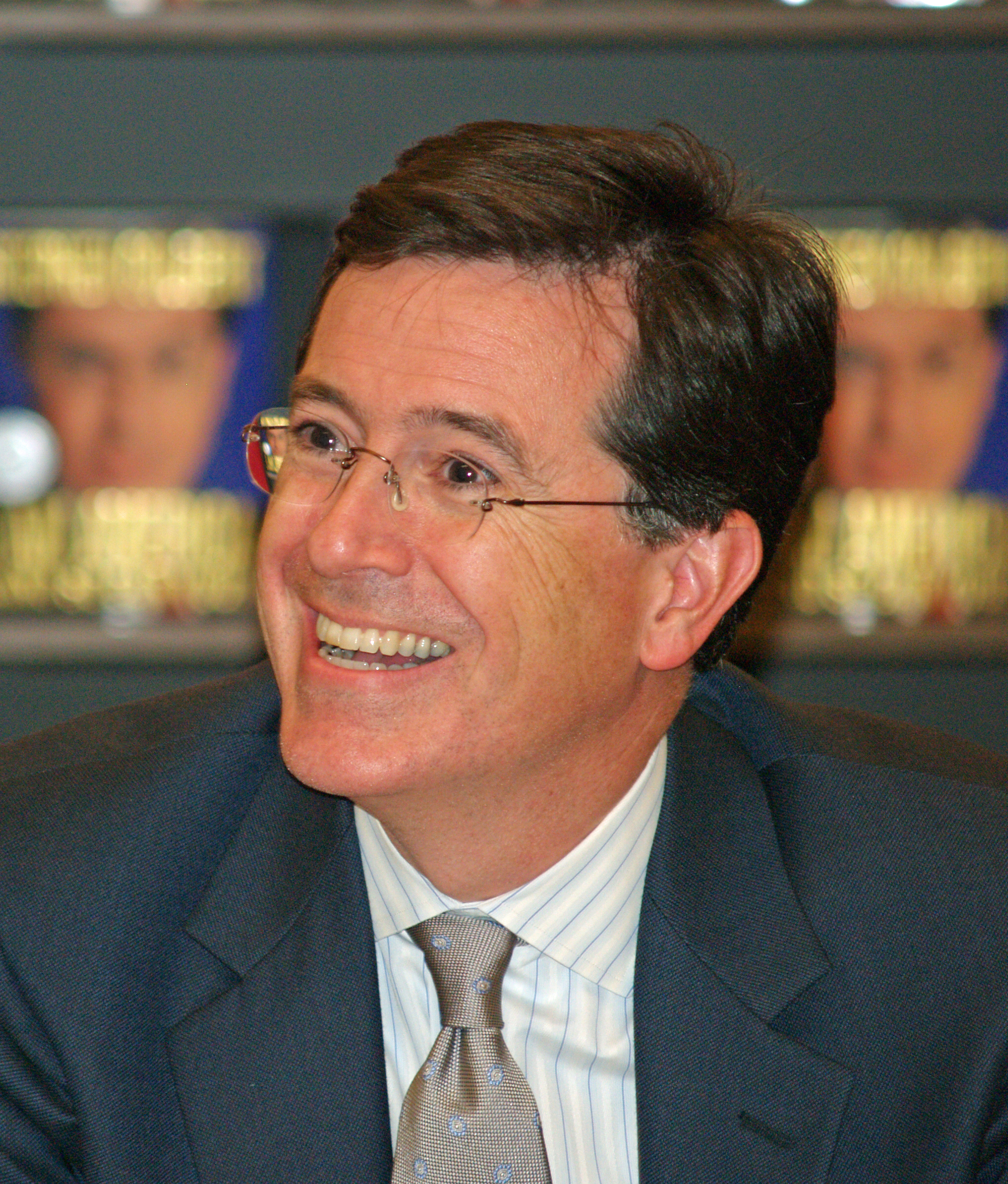
Colbert at a Manhattan Borders for the launch of his show's book, I Am America (And So Can You!), November 2007

Colbert filled in for Sam Seder on the second episode of The Majority Report on Air America Radio and was a frequent guest. He has also done reports for The Al Franken Show. He appeared on a track on Wig in a Box, a tribute album for Hedwig and the Angry Inch. Colbert read the part of Leopold Bloom in Bloomsday on Broadway XXIV: Love Literature Language Lust: Leopold's Women Bloom on June 16, 2005, at Symphony Space in New York City. He appeared in a series of TV commercials for General Motors, as a not-too-bright investigator searching for the elusive (and non-existent in real life) "Mr. Goodwrench". He also portrayed the letter Z in Sesame Street: All-Star Alphabet, a 2005 video release.

Colbert released a book associated with The Colbert Report, I Am America (And So Can You!). It was released on October 7, 2007, by Grand Central Publishing. Grand Central Publishing is the successor to Warner Books, which published America (The Book), written by The Daily Show staff. The book contains similar political satire, but was written primarily by Colbert himself rather than as a collaboration with his Colbert Report writing staff. On November 23, 2008, his Christmas special, A Colbert Christmas: The Greatest Gift of All!, aired on Comedy Central. It was released on DVD in November 2008.

In January 2010, Colbert was named the assistant sports psychologist for the US Olympic speed skating team at the 2010 Winter Olympics. He was also invited to be part of NBC's 2010 Winter Olympics coverage team by Dick Ebersol, chairman of NBC Universal Sports. In April 2011, Colbert performed as Harry in the concert-style revival of Stephen Sondheim's musical Company, presented by the New York Philharmonic at the Lincoln Center. The show, featuring Neil Patrick Harris in the starring role, ran for four nights and was filmed for later showings in movie theaters, which began June 15. In May 2011, Colbert joined the Charleston to Bermuda Race yachting race, as captain of the ship "the Spirit of Juno". He finished second, five miles behind leaders "Tucana". Since 2012, he has collaborated with the Montclair Film Festival in Montclair, New Jersey, of which his wife is a founder and the president of its board. Every year since its foundation, he has participated by hosting an annual fundraising event and leading Q&As and conversations with directors, writers, journalists, and actors including Jon Stewart, Rob Reiner, Steve Carell, J. J. Abrams, David Itzkoff, Ethan Hawke, Rachel Weisz, and Meryl Streep. Colbert is also part of the Montclair Film advisory board.

Colbert has a cameo as a "Laketown Spy" in the film The Hobbit: The Desolation of Smaug, along with his wife and two sons, filmed on location in New Zealand.

Aside from hosting his talk shows, Colbert has hosted other types of shows. He hosted the Kennedy Center Honors for three consecutive years, 2014–2016. In 2017, he hosted the 69th Primetime Emmy Awards. A year later, he used a fake children's book Whose Boat Is This Boat?, incorporating unedited quotes from President Trump during his tour of North Carolina after Hurricane Florence, as a joke against Trump and raised over $1 million for relief funds. In 2014, Colbert, alongside The Colbert Report writer and amateur coder Rob Dubbin, created Scripto, a collaborative script software which allows writer rooms to edit scripts in real time from different locations. Scripto was conceived at the end of 2010, when Colbert and Dubbin first discussed making a bespoke drafting program for the staff. The idea was further inspired by a mishap on the show involving a real life goat. Colbert's wife is also credited as a co-founder of the company. The program is used by several late-night talk shows, including Colbert's Late Show, The Daily Show, and Last Week Tonight with John Oliver.

In 2019, Colbert hosted a conversation with the cast of the film Tolkien as part of an event for Montclair Film and Fathom Events. In 2021, he moderated Lord of the Rings cast reunions screened at Alamo Drafthouse Cinema and made available on a Blu-ray collectors edition of the film series.

Through Spartina, Colbert and his wife served as executive producers for In & Of Itself, a film version of Derek DelGaudio's off-Broadway show of the same name. In 2024, they co-authored Does This Taste Funny?, a cookbook featuring recipes from their family, centered on Lowcountry cuisine.

In 2023, it was reported that Colbert would help produce a television adaptation of Roger Zelazny's fantasy series The Chronicles of Amber.

In August 2025, it was reported that Colbert would be making a guest appearance as a late-night host on the CBS show Elsbeth. The episode saw him reuniting with close collaborator Amy Sedaris.

In 2026, it was announced that Colbert would be co-writing a new film in the Lord of the Rings franchise alongside his son Peter McGee and Philippa Boyens. The film, titled The Lord of the Rings: Shadow of the Past, is set to be an adaptation of the early chapters of The Fellowship of the Ring and will be based on J. R. R. Tolkien's writings. Of the new films announced, one of them will be based on the three chapters containing Tom Bombadil and other early chapters that Peter Jackson's adaptations cut.

== Influences ==
Colbert's self-acknowledged comedy influences include Don Novello; Phil Silvers; Alec Guinness; Bill Cosby; George Carlin; Dean Martin; Jon Stewart; Monty Python, Steve Martin; and David Letterman. In 2017, Colbert said due to the sexual assault allegations made against Cosby, he can no longer listen to his comedy.

Comedians who have cited Colbert as an influence include Nathan Fielder; James Corden; Mindy Kaling; Hasan Minhaj; Jordan Klepper; Ziwe Fumudoh; Sara Benincasa; John Mulaney; Derrick Beckles; Seth Meyers; Julie Klausner; and Billy Eichner.

== Personal life ==
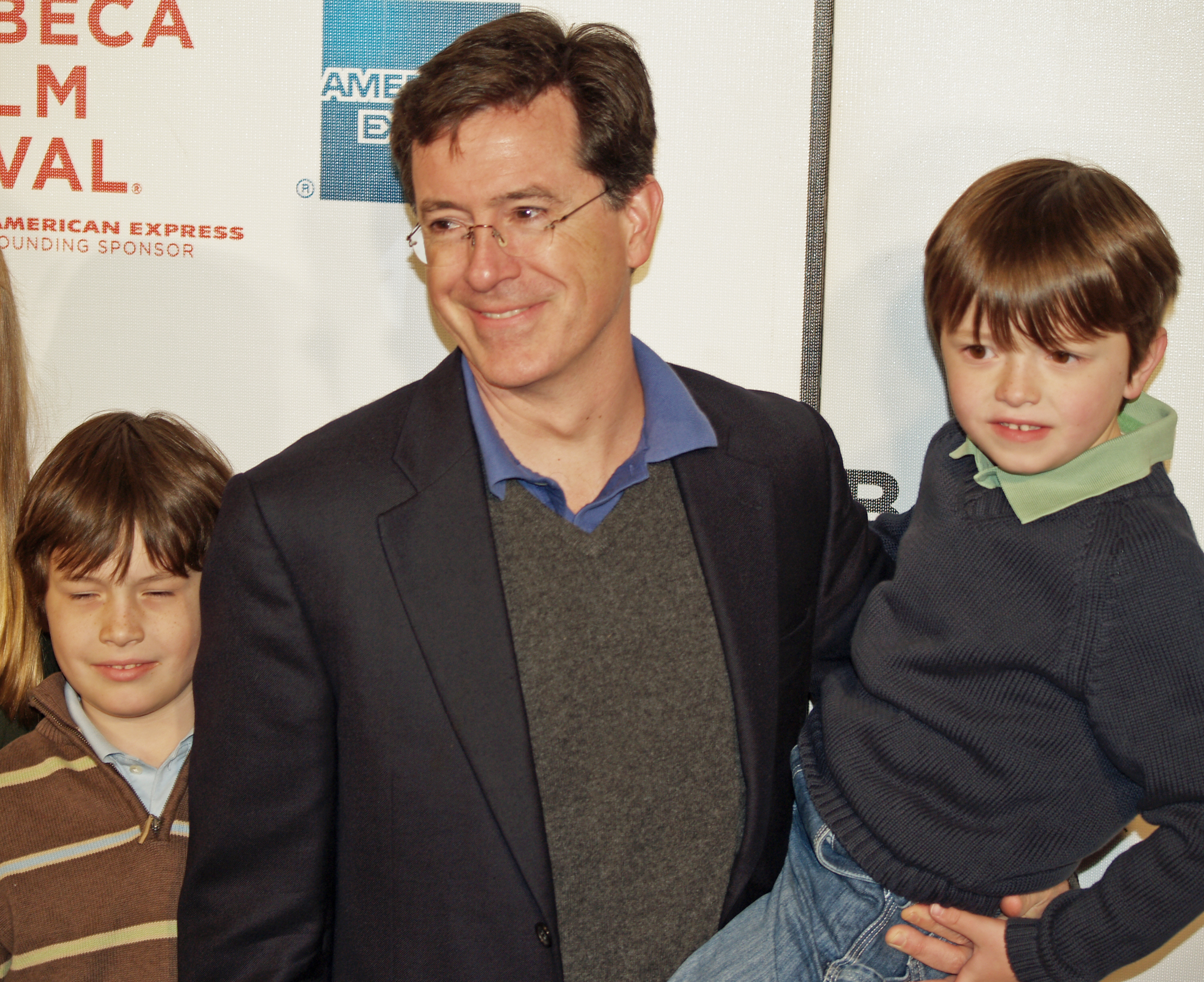
Colbert with his sons at the Tribeca Film Festival in 2008

=== Interests ===
Colbert is an avid reader and his favorite authors include J. R. R. Tolkien, J. D. Salinger, Robertson Davies, George Saunders, Larry Niven, Henry Kuttner, Isaac Asimov, James Joyce, Stephen King and Flannery O'Connor.

Colbert is a known fan of psychedelic folk group Neutral Milk Hotel. He first discovered the band while filming a field piece for The Daily Show in 2005. Their song "Holland, 1945" played over the credits of the last episode of The Colbert Report. He is a fan of Elvis Costello, who joined Paul McCartney, Jon Batiste and the Late Show house band for a cover of the Beatles' "Hello, Goodbye" on the finale of The Late Show with Stephen Colbert.

=== Religious views ===
Colbert is a practicing Roman Catholic who has taught Sunday school at church and is an ordained minister with the Universal Life Church Monastery. He was an altar server for eleven years in his childhood. Raised Catholic, Colbert became an atheist upon attending college. He became curious about other religions and "read chunks" of major texts, including the Book of Mormon, the Upanishads, the Quran, the Bhagavad Gita and the works of D. T. Suzuki. He reconsidered his stance at age 22, after receiving a Bible from a gideon in Chicago. Colbert opened the book in Matthew 6:27, which read, "Can any one of you by worrying add a single hour to your life?" He described reading the verse as if the words "spoke to [me]". He subsequently reverted to Catholicism.

Colbert has disagreed with certain aspects of his church, particularly those regarding homosexuality and abortion. He also supports the ordination of women and the separation of church and state. Colbert showed his appreciation for Pope Francis, in particular his focus on the poor, and met him at the Vatican in June 2024.

=== Family ===
Colbert has been married to Evelyn "Evie" McGee Colbert since 1993. She is the daughter of prominent Charleston civil litigator Joseph McGee, of the firm Buist Moore Smythe McGee (now part of London-based Womble Bond Dickinson). His wife appeared with him in an episode of Strangers with Candy as his mother. She also had an uncredited cameo as a nurse in the series pilot and a credited one (as his wife Clair) in the film. Colbert met McGee at the world premiere of Philip Glass's Hydrogen Jukebox at the Spoleto Festival USA in Charleston. Colbert later described the first moment he met McGee as being a love at first sight encounter. However, moments after they met, they realized they had grown up together in Charleston and had many mutual friends. The couple lives in Montclair, New Jersey, and have three children: daughter Madeleine Carlisle (a reporter and former associate producer for 60 Minutes) and sons Peter and John.

=== Health ===
While he was in college and at Second City, Colbert suffered from bouts of depression and anxiety. In a 2018 interview, he told Rolling Stone:

I needed to be medicated when I was younger to deal with my anxiety that I had thrown my life away by attempting to do something that so few people actually get away with, or succeed at... Xanax was just lovely. Y'know, for a while. And then I realized that the gears were still smoking. I just couldn't hear them anymore. But I could feel them, I could feel the gearbox heating up and smoke pouring out of me... I stopped the Xanax after, like, nine days. I went, 'This isn't helping.' So I just suffered through it. I'd sometimes hold the bottle, to go like, 'I could stop this feeling if I wanted, but I'm not going to. Because I know if I stop the feeling, somehow I'm not working through it, like I have got to go through the tunnel with the spiders in it.'

And then one morning I woke up and my skin wasn't on fire, and it took me a while to figure out what it was. I wake up the next morning, I'm perfectly fine, to the point where my body's still humming. I'm a bell that's been rung so hard that I can still feel myself vibrating. But the actual sound was gone [because] I was starting rehearsal that day to create a new show. And then I went, 'Oh, my God, I can never stop performing.' Creating something is what helped me from just spinning apart like an unweighted flywheel. And I haven't stopped since.

In 2020, Colbert revealed he developed benign paroxysmal positional vertigo, a type of balance disorder. Of the diagnosis he said, "It's almost entertaining, until I forget, and then I go to stand up, and then I just fall down." In April 2022, he tested positive for COVID-19; a few weeks later he experienced recurring symptoms, which led to The Late Show production being halted out of caution. In October 2023, Colbert tested positive for COVID for a second time.

In November 2023, Colbert had a ruptured appendix during a taping of an episode of The Late Show, putting the show on hiatus for a few weeks as he recovered from surgery. Colbert later said the pain he was attempting to conceal during the taping was greatly exacerbated when celebrity chef José Andrés grabbed him for an impromptu dance during a cooking segment. Colbert returned on December 11, 2023.

== Awards and honors ==
In 2000, Colbert and the other Daily Show writers were the recipients of three Emmy Awards as writers for The Daily Show and again in 2005 and 2006. In 2005 he was nominated for a Satellite Award for his performance on The Colbert Report and again in 2006. He was nominated for three Emmys for The Colbert Report in 2006, including Best Performance in a Variety, Musical Program or Special, which he lost to Barry Manilow. Manilow and Colbert jokingly signed and notarized a revolving biannual custody agreement for the Emmy on The Colbert Report episode aired on October 30, 2006. He lost in the same category to Tony Bennett in 2007 and to Don Rickles in 2008.

In January 2006, the American Dialect Society named truthiness, a word which Colbert coined on the premiere episode of The Colbert Report, as its 2005 Word of the Year. He devoted time on five successive episodes to bemoaning the failure of the Associated Press to mention his role in popularizing the word truthiness in its news coverage of the Word of the Year. On December 9, 2006, Merriam-Webster also announced that it selected truthiness as its Word of the Year for 2006. Votes were accepted on their website, and according to poll results, "truthiness" won by a five-to-one margin.

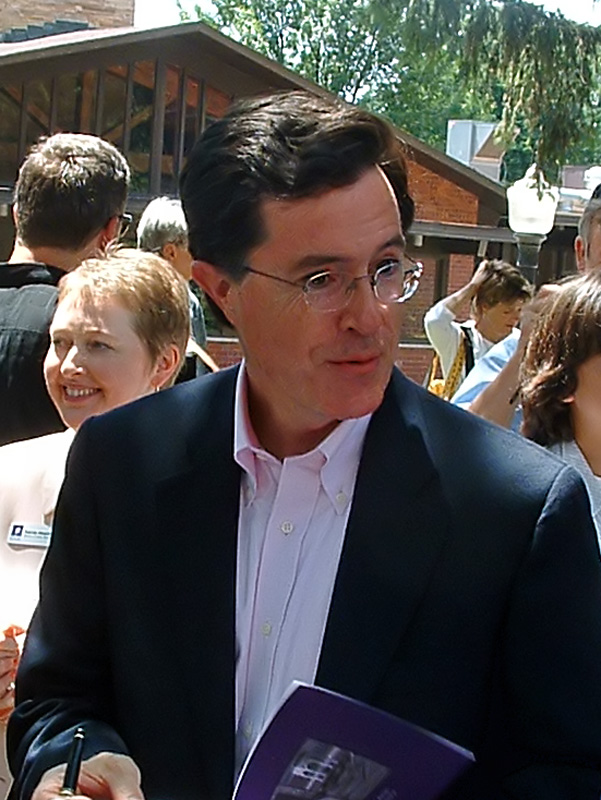
Colbert at Knox College in Galesburg, Illinois, June 2006

In June 2006, after speaking at the school's commencement ceremony, Colbert received an honorary Doctorate of Fine Arts degree from Knox College. Time named Stephen Colbert as one of the 100 most influential people in 2006 and 2012 and in May 2006, New York magazine listed Colbert (and Jon Stewart) as one of its top dozen influential persons in media. Colbert was named Person of the Year by the U.S. Comedy Arts Festival in Aspen, Colorado on March 3, 2007, and was also given the Speaker of the Year Award by The Cross Examination Debate Association (CEDA) on March 24, 2007, for his "drive to expose the rhetorical shortcomings of contemporary political discourse".

Colbert was named the 2nd Sexiest TV News Anchor in September 2006 by Maxim, next to Mélissa Theuriau of France and was the only man featured on the list. In November 2006, he was named a "sexy surprise" by People in the Sexiest Man Alive honors and in the December 2006 issue of GQ he was named one of GQ's "Men of the Year". In 2012, he was listed as No. 69 on Maxim magazine's Hot 100, becoming the first man to be included on the list. He has received three Peabody Awards, in 2007, 2011, and 2020. He was nominated for five TCA Awards for The Colbert Report by the Television Critics Association.

After the Saginaw Spirit defeated the Oshawa Generals in Ontario Junior League Hockey, Oshawa Mayor John Gray declared March 20, 2007 (the mayor's own birthday), Stephen Colbert Day, honoring a previous bet with Stephen. At the event, Gray referred to the publicity the bet brought the city, remarking, "This is the way to lose a bet". Colbert was honored for the Gutsiest Move on the Spike TV Guys' Choice Awards on June 13, 2007, for his performance at the 2006 White House Correspondents' Association Dinner. In August 2007, Virgin America named an airplane, "Air Colbert", in his honor. On October 28, 2007, Colbert received the key to the city of Columbia, South Carolina, from Mayor Bob Coble.

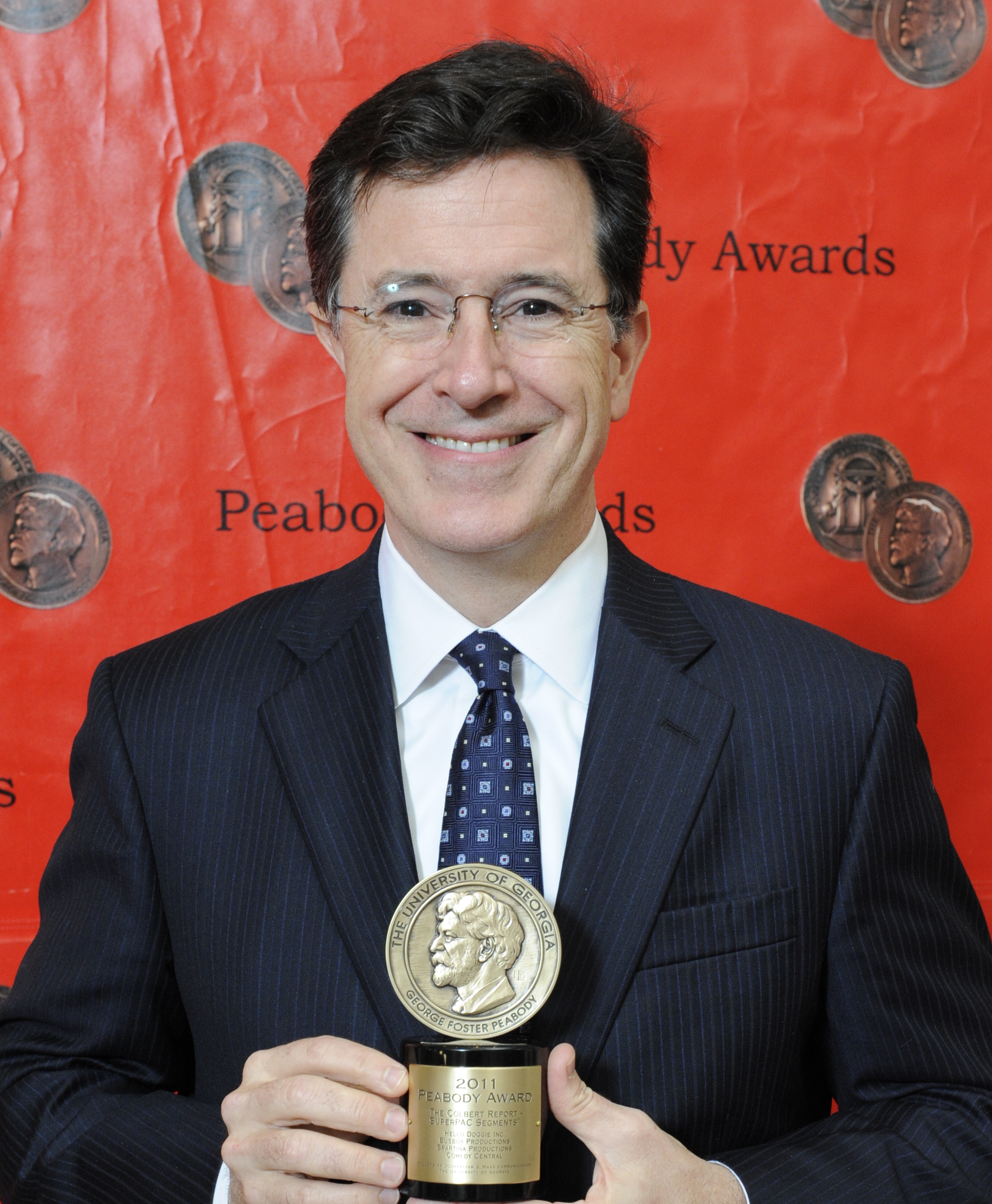
Colbert with his Peabody Award, May 2012

On December 20, 2007, Colbert was named Celebrity of the Year by The Associated Press. On April 2, 2008, he received a Peabody Award for The Colbert Report, saying, "I proudly accept this award and begrudgingly forgive the Peabody Committee for taking three years to recognize greatness". In 2008, Colbert won the Emmy Award for writing again, this time as a writer for The Colbert Report. Colbert delivered the Class Day address to the graduating class of Princeton University on June 2, 2008, and accepted the Class of 2008 Understandable Vanity Award, consisting of a sketch of Colbert and a mirror. He also has been announced as the Person of the Year for the 12th annual Webby Awards.

In January 2010, Colbert received the Grammy Award for Best Comedy Album for his album A Colbert Christmas: The Greatest Gift of All!. He also announced the nominees for Song of the Year while toting a pre-released Apple iPad. Colbert was the 2011 commencement speaker for Northwestern University, and received an honorary degree. In 2013, Colbert again won the Emmy award for writing for The Colbert Report. In 2014, Colbert won the 2014 Best Spoken Word Album for his audiobook America Again: Re-becoming The Greatness We Never Weren't. In January 2013, Rolling Stone named him number 2 in their "The 50 Funniest People Now" list. In December 2014, Paste named his Twitter one of "The 75 Best Twitter Accounts of 2014" ranking it at number 7. Colbert received an honorary degree from Wake Forest University as the 2015 commencement speaker.

In 2015, Colbert was awarded the third highest honor within the Department of the Army Civilian Awards, the Outstanding Civilian Service Award, for substantial contributions to the U.S. Army community. In 2017, 2018, 2019, and 2022 Colbert was named one of "The 35 Most Powerful People in New York Media" by The Hollywood Reporter. He was chosen as one of GQ's "Men of the Year" for its December 2017 issue. Colbert was placed at number 32 in Vanity Fair's "2018 New Establishment List". Other placements in earlier lists include number 40 in 2017 and number 28 in 2011.

In May 2021, Colbert received an honorary Doctor of Humane Letters degree from Yale University. In March 2025, he was named Honorary Patron of the University Philosophical Society at Trinity College Dublin in Ireland. In December 2025, Colbert would receive the Ripple of Hope Award granted by the Robert F. Kennedy Human Rights organization. In 2026 he was awarded the Dean's Cross for Servant Leadership by the Virginia Theological Seminary. In March 2026, Colbert was honored with the "Walter Bernstein Award" at the 78th Writers Guild of America Awards. According to an NBC poll, released in March 2026, Colbert alongside Pope Leo XIV were ranked as the most positive public figures amongst registered voters.

=== Ben & Jerry's AmeriCone Dream ice cream ===
In February 2007, Ben & Jerry's unveiled a new ice cream flavor in honor of Colbert, named Stephen Colbert's AmeriCone Dream. Colbert waited until Easter to sample the ice cream because he "gave up sweets for Lent". Colbert donated all proceeds to charity through the new Stephen Colbert AmeriCone Dream Fund, which distributes the money to various causes.

=== Species named in honor ===
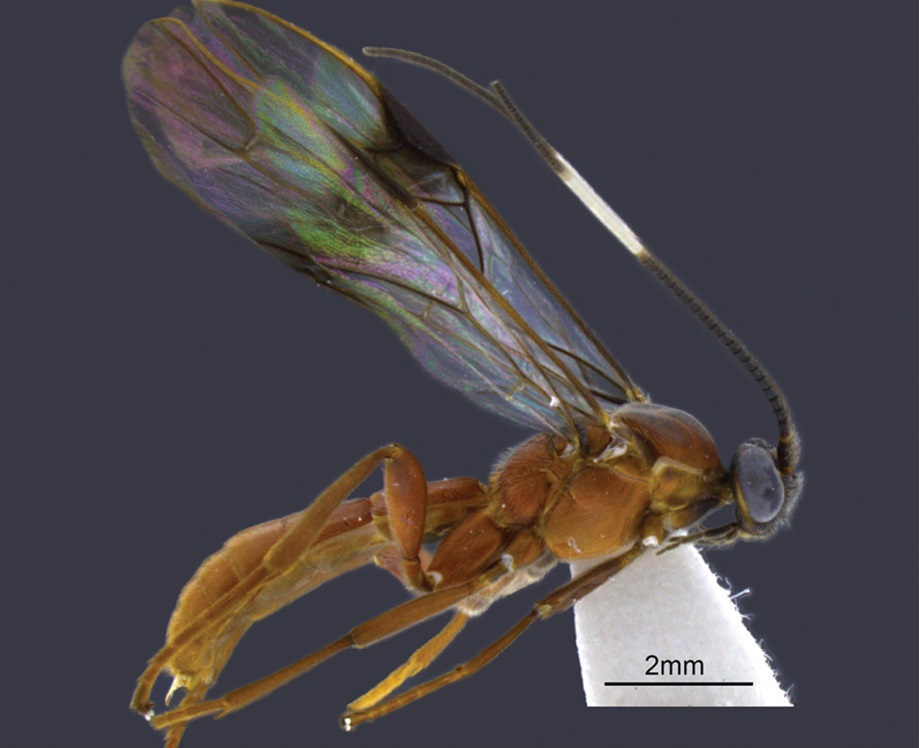
Aleiodes colberti lays eggs inside caterpillars.

At least five species have been given scientific names honoring Colbert. In 2008 a species of California trapdoor spider was named Aptostichus stephencolberti. The spider was named for Colbert after he reported on his television series that Jason Bond, a professor of biology at East Carolina University, had named a different species of spider Myrmekiaphila neilyoungi after the Canadian rock star Neil Young, and began to appeal for a species of animal to be named after him. On a later edition of The Colbert Report, Colbert revealed that Bond would name a spider after him, with Colbert claiming, "And all I had to do was shamelessly beg on national television." Other species named for Colbert include a species of Venezuelan diving beetle named Agaporomorphus colberti and a Chilean stonefly named Diamphipnoa colberti, both formally described in 2008. On his 45th birthday, Colbert was sent a framed print of his eponymous beetle by the biologists who named it. In 2014, a species of parasitic wasp from Ecuador, Aleiodes colberti, was named for Colbert, along with newly described species named for celebrities Jon Stewart, Jimmy Fallon, Ellen DeGeneres, and Shakira, and in 2016 a rove beetle, Sonoma colberti, was named after Colbert's on-screen persona.

=== COLBERT Treadmill ===
In 2009, NASA engineered a new treadmill for the International Space Station. It was taken to the ISS by the Space Shuttle Discovery during the STS-128 mission in August 2009. The complex machine is now used eight hours daily by astronauts and cosmonauts aboard the space station in order to maintain their muscle mass and bone density while spending long periods of time in a zero-gravity environment. While engineers at NASA were constructing this treadmill, it was simply called T-2 for more than two years. However, on April 14, 2009, NASA renamed it the "Combined Operational Load-Bearing External Resistance Treadmill", or COLBERT. NASA named the treadmill after Colbert, who took an interest during the Node 3 naming census for the ISS module, Tranquility.

Colbert urged his followers to post the name "Colbert", which upon completion of the census received the most entries totaling 230,539, some 40,000 votes more than the second-place choice, Serenity. The COLBERT is expected to last the life of the ISS and will have seen about 38,000 miles of running when the Space Station is retired in 2030, but it was also built with a 150,000-mile lifespan (if needed until 2028 or beyond). Colbert realized he was the recipient of an extremely rare honor – the COLBERT (a backronym) is the only piece of NASA-engineered equipment in space that is named after a living human being – when astronaut Sunita Williams came on The Colbert Report to announce that NASA had named the treadmill after him.

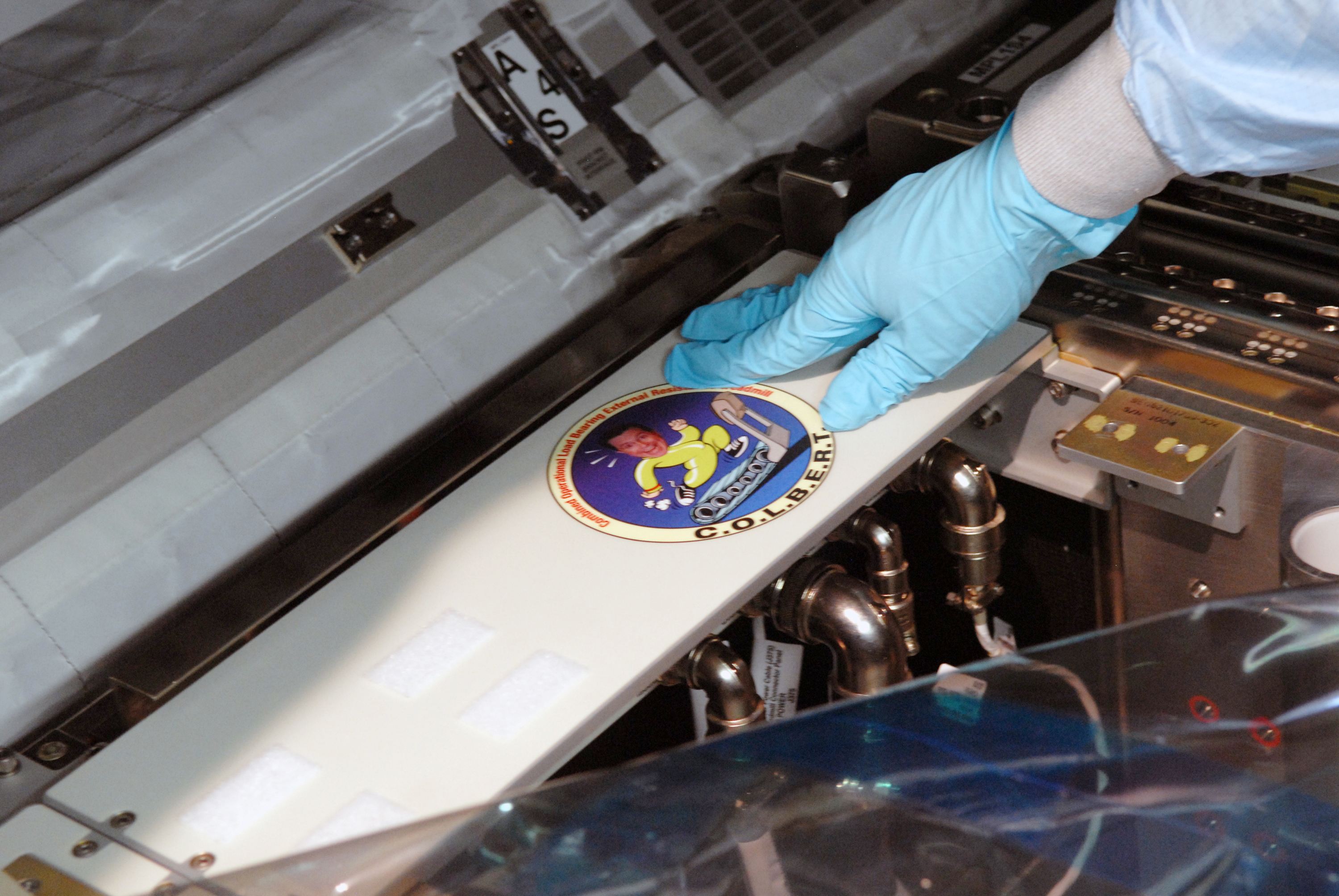
C.O.L.B.E.R.T. logo being applied to the Combined Operational Load-Bearing External Resistance Treadmill at NASA before Launch

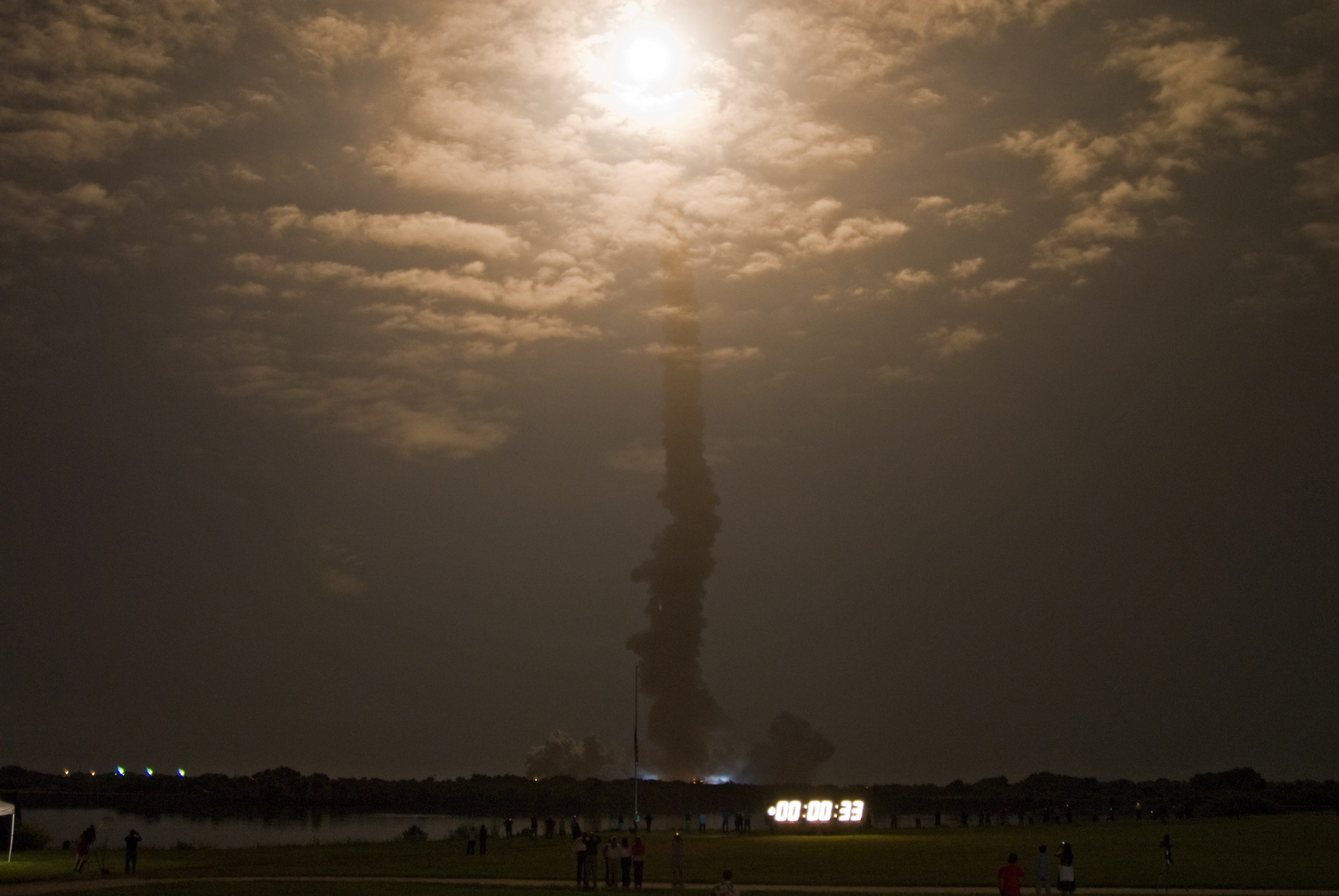
Launch of Discovery Mission STS-128, which delivered the COLBERT to the ISS

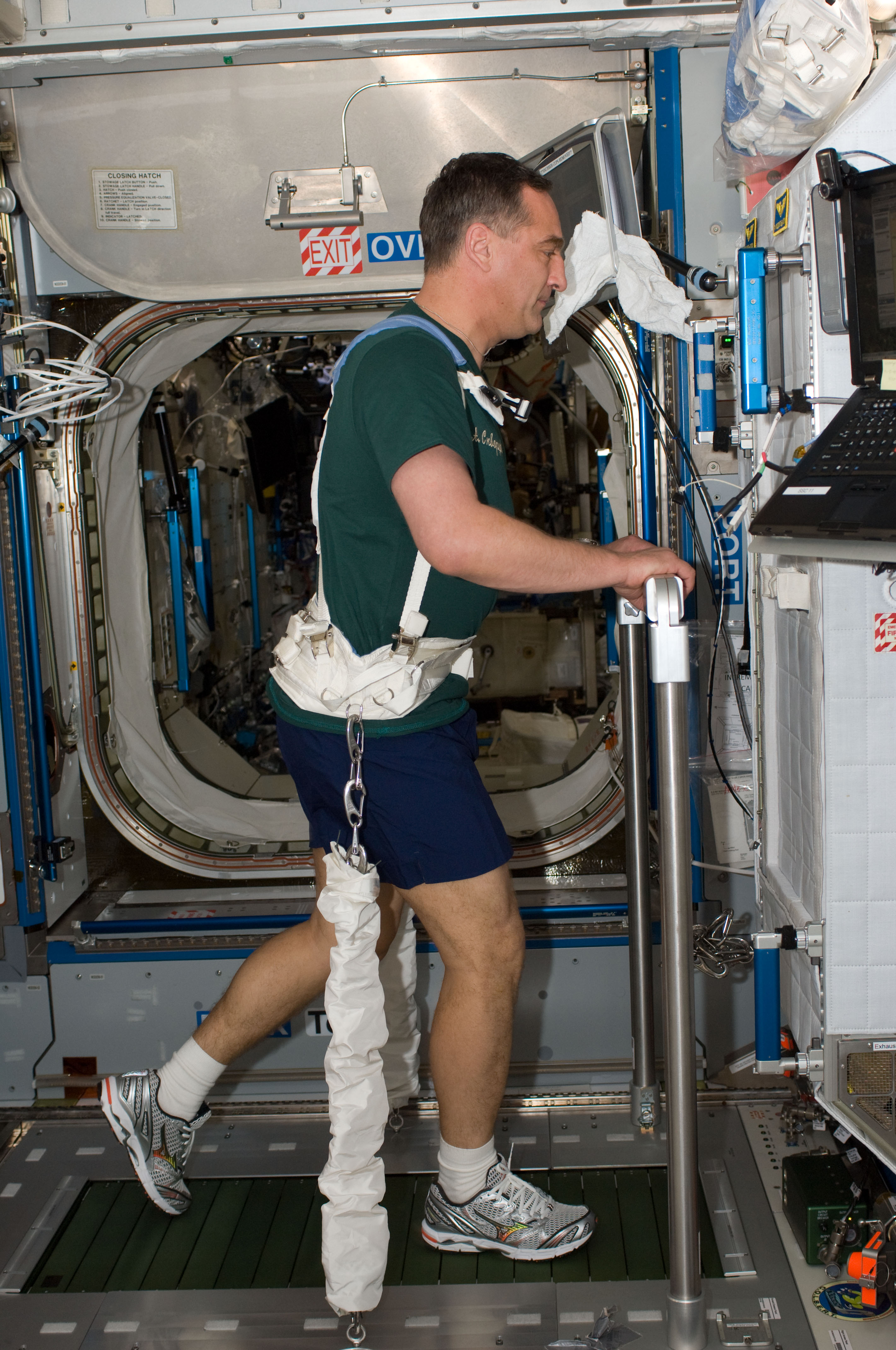
Cosmonaut Alexander Skvortsov exercises on COLBERT in the Harmony Node of the International Space Station.

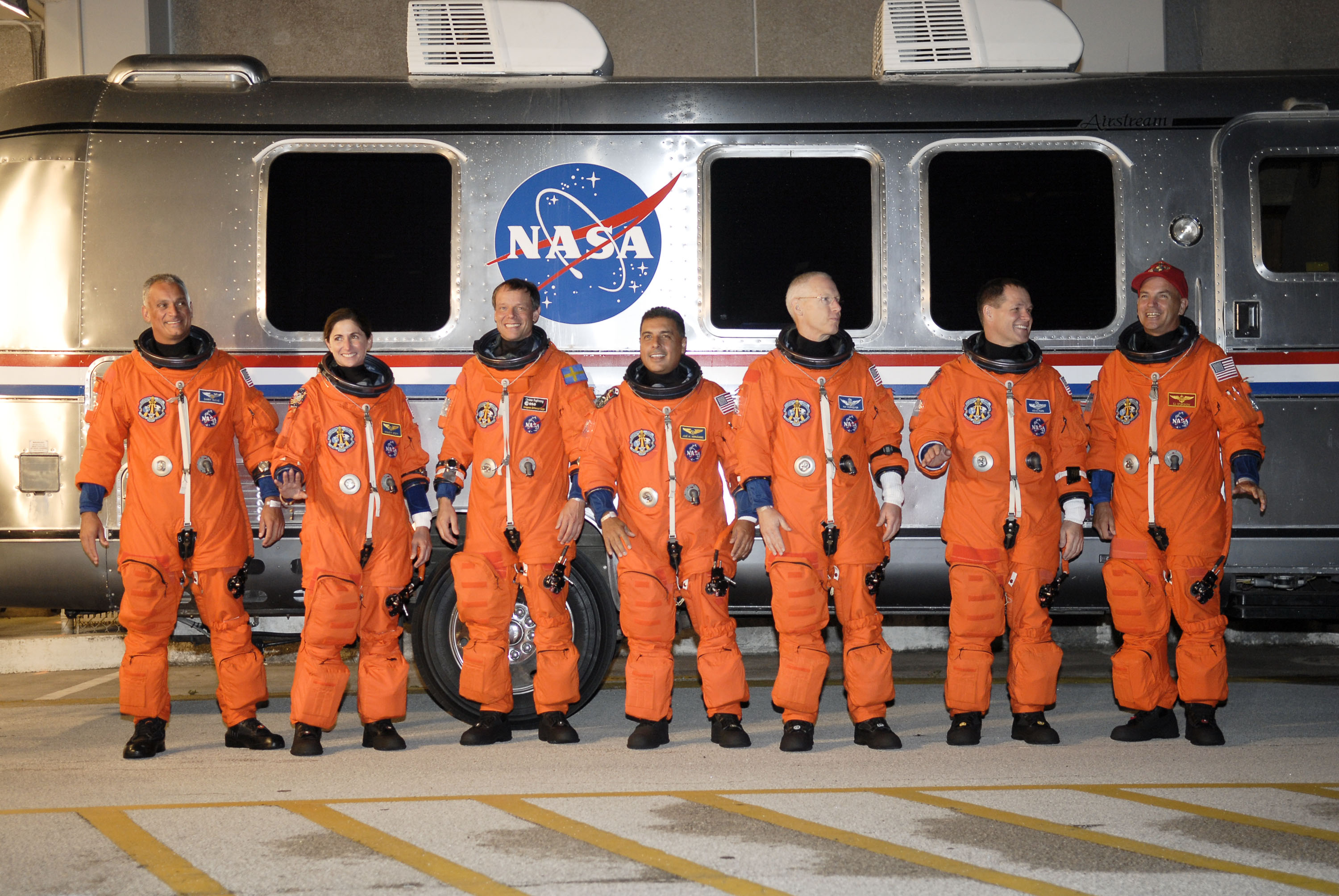
The crew who delivered Stephen Colbert's honorary space treadmill

== Filmography ==
=== Film ===
Year	Title	Role	Notes
1997	Shock Asylum	Dr. Dewalt	Short film
2003	Nobody Knows Anything!	TV Newsman	
2005	The Great New Wonderful	Mr. Peersall	
2005	Bewitched	Stu Robison	
2006	Strangers with Candy	Chuck Noblet	Also writer and producer
2008	The Love Guru	Jay Kell	
2009	Monsters vs. Aliens	President Hathaway (voice)	
2011	Company	Harry	Filmed production
2013	The Hobbit: The Desolation of Smaug	Lake-town spy	Cameo
2014	Mr. Peabody & Sherman	Paul Peterson (voice)	
2017	Too Funny to Fail	Himself	Documentary
2020	In & Of Itself	—	Executive producer
2024	Despicable Me 4	Perry Prescott (voice)	
2026	Mary Oliver: Saved by the Beauty of the World	Himself	Documentary

=== Television ===
Year	Title	Role	Notes
1993	Missing Persons	Chet Davies	Episode: "Cabe... What Kind of Name Is That?"
1995–1996	Exit 57	Various	12 episodes; also co-creator and writer
1996	The Dana Carvey Show	Various	8 episodes; also writer
1996	Spin City	Frank	Episode: "The Competition"
1996–2011	Saturday Night Live	Ace / Dr. Brainio (voices)	14 episodes; also writer
1997	Apartment 2F	Various roles	Episode: "1.6"
1997	The Chris Rock Show	Announcer (voice)	Episode: "1.5"
1997	HBO Comedy Hour: Janeane Garofalo	Dog trainer	TV Special
1997–2005	The Daily Show	Stephen Colbert (correspondent)	1,316 episodes; also writer
1999	Late Night with Conan O'Brien	Violin Player	Episode: "1,144"
1999	Random Play	Various	2 episodes
1998	Whose Line Is It Anyway?	Himself	Season 1, Episode 17
1999–2000	Strangers with Candy	Chuck Noblet	30 episodes; also co-creator, writer, and executive producer
2001–2007	Harvey Birdman, Attorney at Law	Phil Ken Sebben / Myron Reducto / Various voices	34 episodes
2002	The New York Friars Roast of Chevy Chase	Himself	Television special
2002	Crank Yankers	Rob (voice)	Episode: "1.1"
2004	Curb Your Enthusiasm	Tourist Man	Episode: "Opening Night"
2004	Law & Order: Criminal Intent	James Bennett	Episode: "The Saint"
2004	The Wrong Coast	Various voices	2 episodes
2004, 2006; 2015	The Venture Bros.	Professor Richard Impossible (voice)	3 episodes
2005	American Dad!	Dr. Dandliker (voice)	Episode: "All About Steve"
2005	All-Star Alphabet	The letter 'Z'	Sesame Street special
2005–2014	The Colbert Report	Stephen Colbert (host)	1,447 episodes; also co-creator, writer, and executive producer
2006	White House Correspondents' Dinner	Stephen Colbert (host)	TV special
2007	The Simpsons	Colby Krause (voice)	Episode: "He Loves to Fly and He D'ohs"
2008	A Colbert Christmas: The Greatest Gift of All!	Stephen Colbert	TV special
2010	Rally to Restore Sanity and/or Fear	Stephen Colbert (host)	TV special
2012	The Office	Broccoli Rob	Episode: "Here Comes Treble"
2013	Alpha House	Stephen Colbert	Episode: "Pilot"
2014	@midnight	Stephen Colbert	Episode: "156"
2014–2015	BoJack Horseman	Mr. Witherspoon (voice)	2 episodes
2015	House of Cards	Stephen Colbert	Episode: "Chapter 27"
2015	The Mindy Project	Father Michael O'Donnell	Episode: "Confessions of a Catho-holic"
2015	Rick and Morty	Zeep Xanflorp (voice)	Episode: "The Ricks Must Be Crazy"
2015, 2026	Only In Monroe	Himself (guest host)	2 episodes
2015–2026	The Late Show with Stephen Colbert	Himself (host)	1,801 episodes; also writer and executive producer
2017	At Home with Amy Sedaris	Himself	Episode: "Gift Giving"
2017	69th Primetime Emmy Awards	Himself (host)	TV special
2018–2020	Our Cartoon President	—	46 episodes; also co-creator, writer, and executive producer
2018–2020	Our Cartoon President	Wolf Blitzer / Various voices	25 episodes
2018	Harvey Birdman: Attorney General	Phil Ken Sebben (voice)	TV special
2018, 2022, 2025	Mark Twain Prize for American Humor	Presenter	
2019	Madam Secretary	Himself	Episode: "Hail to the Chief"
2019–2022	Critical Role	Capo / Lucky Jack	2 episodes
2020–2023	Tooning Out the News	—	263 episodes; Co-creator, writer, and executive producer
2021	Girls5eva	Alf Musik	Episode: "Alf Musik"
2021	Teenage Euthanasia	Announcer (voice)	Episode: "Dada M.I.A."
2021–2023	Hell of a Week with Charlamagne tha God	—	18 episodes; Executive producer
2022	Fairview	—	8 episodes; Executive producer
2024–2025	After Midnight	—	199 episodes; Executive producer
2025	Elsbeth	Scotty Bristol	Episode: "Yes, And..."
2025	Star Trek: Starfleet Academy	Voice of Starfleet Academy's Digital Dean of Students	10 episodes

=== Video games ===
Year	Title	Voice role
2005	Outlaw Tennis	Announcer

=== Theatre ===
Year	Title	Role	Venue	Ref.
2011	Company	Harry	Concert with the New York Philharmonic at Lincoln Center	

== Published works ==
- Colbert, Dinello, Sedaris; Wigfield: The Can-Do Town That Just May Not (Hyperion; May 19, 2004), ISBN 0-7868-8696-X
- America (The Book): A Citizen's Guide to Democracy Inaction (Warner Books; September 2004), ISBN 0-446-53268-1
- I Am America (And So Can You!) (Grand Central Publishing; October 9, 2007), ISBN 0-446-58050-3
- America Again: Re-becoming the Greatness We Never Weren't (Grand Central Publishing; October 2, 2012), ISBN 0-446-58397-9
- I Am a Pole (And So Can You!) (Grand Central Publishing; May 8, 2012), ISBN 1-455-52342-9
- Stephen Colbert's Midnight Confessions (Simon & Schuster; September 5, 2017), ISBN 978-1501169007
- Colbert, McGee-Colbert, Does This Taste Funny?: Recipes Our Family Loves (Celadon Books; September 17, 2024), ISBN 978-1250859990

== See also ==
- New Yorkers in journalism
- Political satire
