= Sesame Street: All-Star Alphabet =

Children's film

- Directed by: Adam Matalon
- Written by: Christine Ferraro
- Based on: Sesame Street
- Produced by: Kevin Burke; Adam Matalon; Dionne Nosek
- Starring: Nicole Sullivan; Stephen Colbert; Sheryl Crow; The Chicks; Melissa Etheridge; Larry King; Norah Jones
- Cinematography: Kevin Burke
- Edited by: Sam Caino
- Animation by: Mike Pantuso
- Production companies: Chatsby Films; Sesame Workshop
- Distributed by: Sony Wonder; Genius Entertainment; Warner Home Video
- Release date: 2 August 2005 (location)
- Running time: 48 minutes
- Language: English

Sesame Street: All-Star Alphabet is a 2005 direct-to-video special. All-Star Alphabet is an anthology of over two dozen scenes taken from episodes of the children's television series Sesame Street and tied together by new scenes featuring Nicole Sullivan and Stephen Colbert as the letters "A" and "Z" respectively. The special also stars Sheryl Crow, The Dixie Chicks, Melissa Etheridge, Larry King, and Norah Jones.

== Plot ==
In addition to the scenes featuring Nicole Sullivan and Stephen Colbert as "A" and "Z," All-Star Alphabet is made up of twenty-six segments (one for each letter of the alphabet), plus two for the entire alphabet. All of these segments are from prior episodes of Sesame Street, although some are slightly edited.

| Letter | Segment Title (Note: Most segments are untitled.) | Original Episode | Notes |
|---|---|---|---|
| | "Elmo's Rap Alphabet" | 3456 | |
| A | A man talks about words that start with "A" | 4064 | Animated |
| B | "No Letter Better Than B" | 3996 | Sung by The Dixie Chicks, with Big Bird, Bert, Baby Bear, The Count, and some chickens |
| C | "C-Cowboy and C-Cowgirl" with Elmo and Zoe | 3901 | |
| D | Telly talks about words that start with "D" | 3970 | |
| E | Song: Flying E's | 2937 | |
| F | F is for Fan, Fiddle, Frog and Football (computer game) | 3899 | |
| G | "G, You're So Great" | 3397 | |
| H | "Soul H" | 3368 | Animated |
| I | "I Soaks Up The Sun" | 4036 | Sung by Sheryl Crow, with Elmo, Telly, Zoe, and Rosita |
| J | "Jumping J" | 4051 | Animated |
| K | A handclapping chant about the letter K | 3012 | |
| L | A spokesman talks about words that start with "L" | 3306 | Animated |
| M | "M is for Monster" | 3885 | Original street scene |
| N | Kids form the letter "N" | 4021 | |
| O | "Say O!" (breakdance) | 4030 | |
| P | "P" words | 3066 | Animated |
| Q | "Queen Quagmire" | 4073 | Animated |
| R | "Cookie Monster's R Rap" | 3995 | Originally a Letter Of The Day sketch |
| S | Grover has 15 seconds to name a word that start with S | 3551 | |
| T | T for turning and tired | 3851 | |
| U | "Like The Way U Does" | 3529 | Sung by Melissa Etheridge |
| V | "V" words | 3399 | |
| W | Larry King interviews the letter W about people's favorite W words | 4079 | Features Larry King |
| X | "This is the letter X" | 2862 | Animated |
| Y | "Don't Know Y" | 4081 | Sung by Norah Jones |
| Z | Cookie Monster and the letter Z | 3296 | Featuring Lexine Bondoc |
| | "ABC Hip Hop" | 4053 | Sung by Miles and the Sesame Street Monsters |

== Cast ==
=== Muppet performers ===
- Kevin Clash as Elmo, The Letter "W"
- Pam Arciero
- Jennifer Barnhart
- Fran Brill as Zoe, Prairie Dawn
- Lisa Buckley
- Stephanie D'Abruzzo
- Alice Dinnean-Vernon
- Olamide Faison as Miles
- Eric Jacobson as Bert (voice)
- Jim Kroupa
- Peter Linz
- Rick Lyon
- Lara MacLean
- Jim Martin
- Joseph Mazzarino
- Jerry Nelson as The Count
- Carmen Osbahr as Rosita
- Martin P. Robinson as Telly Monster (voice)
- David Rudman as Baby Bear, Cookie Monster (voice)
- John Tartaglia
- Matt Vogel
- Frank Oz as Grover, Cookie Monster

=== Humans ===
- Nicole Sullivan as The Letter "A"
- Stephen Colbert as The Letter "Z"
- Sheryl Crow
- Melissa Etheridge
- Olamide Faison as Miles
- Norah Jones
- Larry King
- Martie Maguire
- Natalie M. Pasdar
- Emily Robinson

== Production ==
A majority of the special is older footage from Sesame Street, but the scenes involving Nicole Sullivan and Stephen Colbert were made solely for the purpose of the special. These new scenes were filmed at the Westfield Garden State Plaza in Paramus, New Jersey.
